= List of churches in Mumbai =

This is a list of Cathedrals, Churches and Basilica in Mumbai, The list focuses on the more permanent churches and buildings which identify themselves as places of Christian worship. The denominations appended are those by which they self-identify.

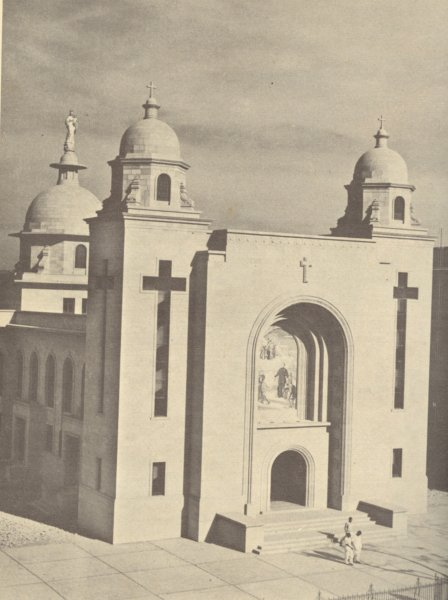
Church of Mary Help of Christians, Mumbai

Church name	Location	Dedication	Founded	Denomination	Notes
Cathedral of the Holy Name	Colaba	--	1902	Roman Catholic	Church is the seat of the Roman catholic Archbishop of Bombay and headquarters of the Archdiocese of Bombay
Triumphant Bible Church	Mumbai	-	1998	Believers' Church	
Church of Our Lady of Dolours, Wadala	Wadala	Mother Mary	1937	Roman Catholic	Church is primarily set for local East Indian people
Church of Our Lady of Health, Cavel	Kalbadevi	Mother Mary	1812	Roman Catholic	It was originally built by the Portuguese in 1794,
Church of Our Lady of Mount Carmel, Bandra	Bandra	Mother Mary	1894	Roman Catholic	It was built in 1894 by Jesuit Missionaries
Gloria Church	Byculla	Mother Mary	1913	Roman Catholic	on one of the oldest Roman Catholic church in Mumbai; its predecessor was built by the Portuguese Franciscans in 1632
Holy Cross Church, Kurla	Kurla	--	1913	Roman Catholic	It was built during the Portuguese era by the Jesuits in 1588 and rebuilt in 1848. It is one of the oldest churches in Mumbai
Mount Mary Church, Bandra	Bandra	Mother Mary	1913	Roman Catholic	More commonly known as Mount Mary Church, is a Roman Catholic Minor Basilica draws lakhs of devotees and pilgrims annually
Our Lady of Egypt Church	Kalina	Mother Mary	1606	Roman Catholic	church was founded in 1606 and celebrated its 400th anniversary in mid-2006
Church of Our Lady of Good Counsel & Shrine of St. Anthony, Sion	Sion	Mother Mary	1596	Roman Catholic	is one of the oldest churches built by the Portuguese Franciscans. initially known in Portuguese, Nossa Senhora de Bom Concelho,
Our Lady of Immaculate Conception Church, Mt. Poinsur	Borivali	Mother Mary	1547	Roman Catholic	Built in 1544, ten years after the Bombay-Baçaim coastal tracts were ceded by the Sultan of Cambay, Bahadur Shah, to Portugal by the Treaty of Baçaim
The Church of Our Lady of Salvation - Dadar	Dadar	Mother Mary	1596	Roman Catholic	Popularly referred to as Portuguese Church, is one of the oldest church was originally built in 1596 by the Portuguese Franciscans who called it Nossa Senhora da Salvação. The present structure, constructed between 1974 and 1977
Sacred Heart Church, Santacruz	Santacruz	--	1936	Roman Catholic	The church, founded in 1936, is a Grade III heritage structure
St. Andrew's Church	Bandra	St. Andrew	1575	Roman Catholic	is one of the oldest churches in Mumbai, Originally built by the Portuguese Jesuits in 1575. It stands on the sea-shore of the Bandra and was the only church there till the first quarter of the 17th century.
St. John the Baptist Church	Marol	St. John	1579	Roman Catholic	St. John the Baptist Church is an abandoned and ruined church presently located within the SEEPZ Industrial Area, The church was abandoned in 1840 after an epidemic hit the village.
St. Joseph's Church, Juhu	Juhu	St. Joseph	1853	Roman Catholic	--
St. Michael's Church	Mahim	Michael (archangel)	1973	Roman Catholic	The church was originally built by the Portuguese in 1534. Initially known as San Miguel, it is the oldest Portuguese Franciscan church in Mumbai. It was rebuilt a number of times; the present structure dating to 1973.
The Church of St. John the Evangelist	Navy Nagar	St. Joseph	1865	Protestant Churches	Better known as the Afghan Church, built by the British to commemorate the dead of the First Afghan War and the disastrous 1842 retreat from Kabul. also record casualties from the Second Anglo-Afghan War.
St. Thomas Cathedral	Navy Nagar	Thomas the Apostle	1718	Protestant Churches	is the cathedral church of the Diocese of Mumbai of the Church of North India.
All Saints' Church, Malabar Hill	Malabar Hill	--	1881	Church of North India/Anglican	Originally built to provide a closer alternative to the congregation that had to travel to St. Thomas Cathedral in Fort.
Ambroli Church	Girgaon	--	1832	Church of North India	
Emmanuel Church, Mumbai	Grant Road	--	1869	Church of North India	
Church of St Andrew and St Columba	Kala Ghoda, Fort, Mumbai	--	1819	Church of Scotland	
Messiah Assemblies of God	Navi Mumbai, Old Panvel, Navi Mumbai	--	2015	AG Assemblies of God	
