= List of parishes of the Roman Catholic Archdiocese of Bombay =

The Roman Catholic Archdiocese of Bombay comprises eleven Deaneries consisting of 121 member parishes spread over the Mumbai Metropolitan Region.

== South Mumbai Deanery ==
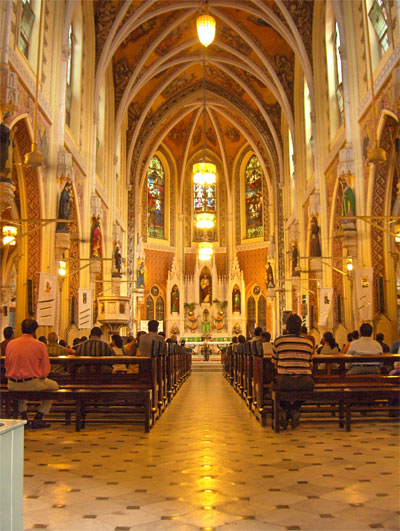
Holy Name Cathedral

- Byculla: Our Lady of Glory
- Cavel: Our Lady of Health
- Colaba: St. Joseph
- Cumballa Hill: St. Stephen
- Dabul: St. Francis Xavier
- Fort: Holy Name Cathedral
- Fort: St. John the Evangelist
- Girgaum: St. Teresa
- Mandvi: St. Ignatius
- Mazagaon: Our Lady of the Rosary
- Mazagaon: St. Anne
- Sonapur: Our Lady of Dolours
- Umerkhadi: St. Joseph

== North Mumbai Deanery ==
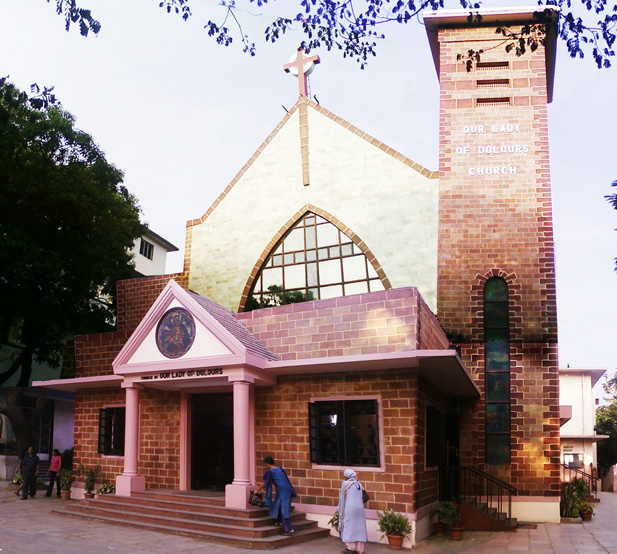
Our Lady of Dolours Church, Wadala

- Dadar East: St. Paul Church
- Dadar West: Our Lady of Salvation
- Dharavi: St. Anthony Church
- Jacob Circle: St. Ignatius Church
- Lower Parel: Holy Cross Church
- Mahim: Our Lady of Victories
- Mahim: St. Michael
- Sewri: Our Lady of Fatima Church
- Sion East: Church of Our Lady of Good Counsel & Shrine of St. Anthony, Sion
- Sion West: Our Lady of Lourdes
- Wadala East: St. Dominic Savio Church
- Wadala West: Our Lady of Dolours
- Worli: Sacred Heart Church

== Bandra Deanery ==
- Bandra East: St. Joseph the Worker
- Bandra West: Mount Carmel
- Bandra West: St. Andrew
- Bandra West: St. Anne
- Bandra West: St. Francis of Assisi
- Bandra West: St. Peter
- Bandra West: St. Theresa
- Khar: St. Vincent de Paul

== Santa Cruz Deanery ==
- Irla: Our Lady of Velankanni
- Juhu: St. Joseph
- Juhu-Tara:Holy Cross
- Kalina: Our Lady of Egypt
- Santa Cruz: Sacred Heart Church
- Vakola: St. Anthony
- Vile Parle: St. Francis Xavier

== Kurla Deanery ==
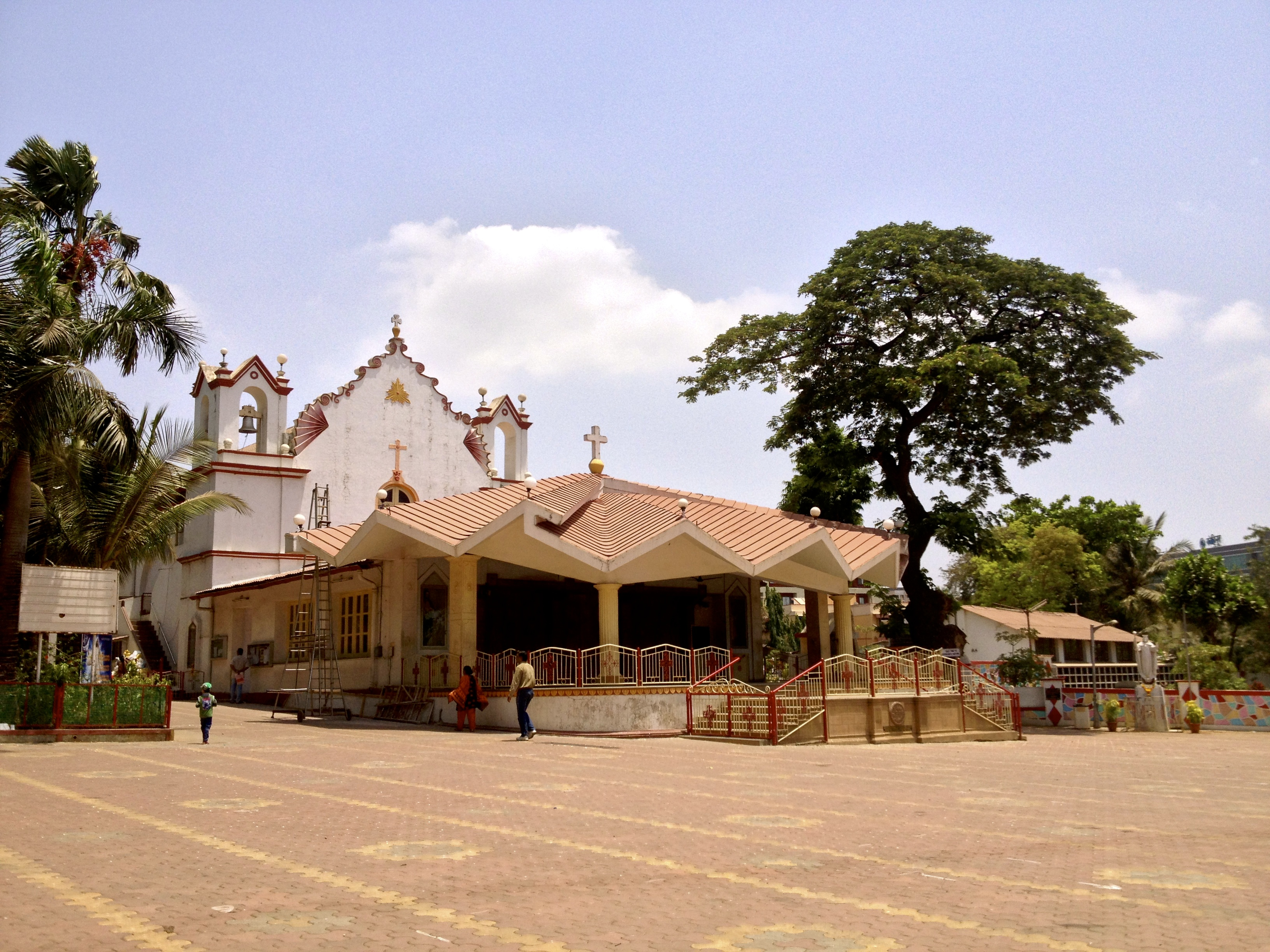
Holy Cross Church, Kurla

- Kurla: Holy Cross
- Kurla: St. Joseph
- Kurla: St. Jude, Jari-Mari
- Chembur East: Our Lady of Perpetual Succour, Diamond Garden
- Chembur East: St. Sebastian, Marouli
- Chembur West: Holy Family Church, Pestom Sagar
- Trombay: Our Lady of Velankanni, Cheetah Camp (Tamil Parish)
- Ghatkopar East: Infant Jesus
- Kirol: Our Lady of Fatima
- Mankhurd: St. Anthony
- Saki Naka: St. Anthony
- Govandi: Christ the King, Shivaji Nagar

== Andheri Deanery ==
- Andheri East: Holy Family
- Andheri East: Sacred Heart
- Andheri East: St. John the Evangelist, Marol
- Andheri East: St. Vincent Pallotti, Marol
- Andheri East: Our Lady of Health, Sahar
- Andheri West: Our Lady of Health, Versova
- Andheri West: Good Shepherd
- Andheri West: St. Blaise, Amboli
- Jogeshwari East: Infant Jesus
- Jogeshwari West: Christ the King

== Borivali Deanery ==
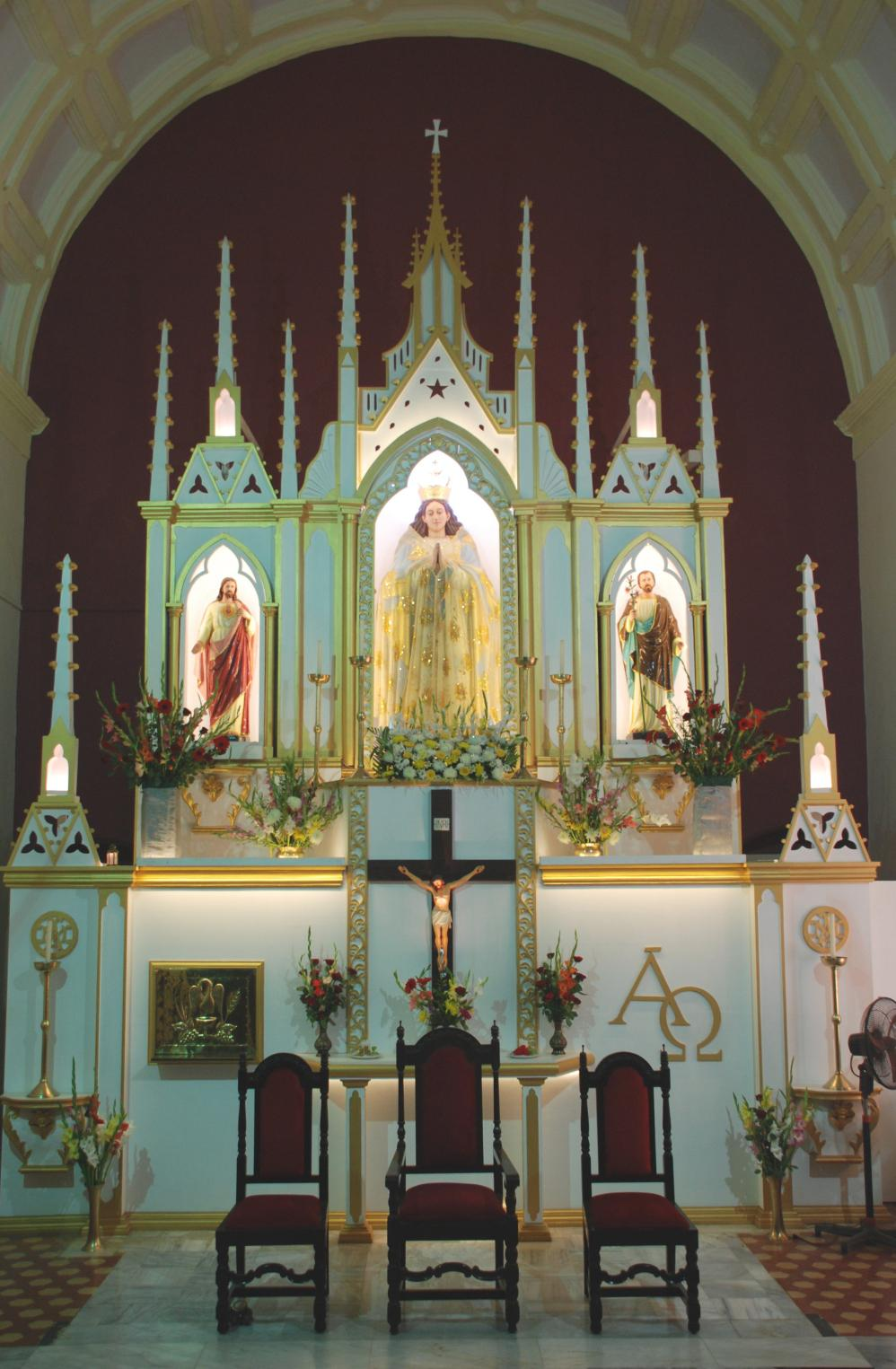
Altar of I.C. Church, Borivali

- Borivli East: Christ the King
- Borivli West: Our Lady of the Immaculate Conception
- Borivli West: St. John Bosco
- Dahisar: St. Louis
- Goregaon East: St. Joseph
- Goregaon East: St. Thomas
- Goregaon West: Our Lady of the Rosary
- Kandivli East: Nativity of Our Lord
- Kandivli West: Our Lady of the Assumption
- Kandivali West: Our Lady of Remedy, Poinsur
- Malad : Our Lady of the Sea, Madh
- Malad East: St. Jude
- Malad West: Our Lady of Lourdes
- Malad : St. Anthony, Malwani
- Malad : Our Lady of the Forsaken, Malwani Colony

== Bhayandar Deanery ==
- Bhayandar East: Divine Mercy
- Bhayandar West: Our Lady of Nazareth
- Chowk: St. Andrew
- Dongri: Our Lady of Bethlehem
- Dongri - Irmitri: Our Lady of Fátima
- Gorai: Holy Magi
- Kashimira: St. Jerome
- Manori: Our Lady of Perpetual Succour
- Mira Road: St. Joseph
- Uttan: Our Lady of the Sea
- Uttan-Pali: Our Lady of Lourdes

== Thane Deanery ==
- Thane: St. John the Baptist
- Thane: Our Lady of Mercy, Pokhran
- Thane: St. Lawrence, Wagle Estate
- Thane: Our Lady of Fatima, Majiwada
- Mulund: St. Pius the Tenth
- Bhandup : St. Anthony, Tembipada
- Vikhroli: St. Joseph
- Vikhroli: St. Francis Xavier, Parksite
- Kanjur: St. Francis Xavier
- Powai: Most Holy Trinity

== Kalyan Deanery ==
- Ambernath: Our Lady of Fatima
- Badlapur: St. Francis Xavier
- Dombivli: Infant Jesus
- Dombivli: Our Lady of Velankanni
- Hedutane: Holy Family
- Kalwa: St. Anthony of Padua
- Kalyan: Our Lady of Lourdes
- Mumbra: St. Joseph the Worker
- Ulhasnagar: Our Lady of Perpetual Succour

== Navi Mumbai Deanery ==
- Airoli: St. Theresa of the Child Jesus
- CBD Belapur: St. Joseph
- Ghansoli: Our Lady of the Forsaken
- Kalamboli: Holy Spirit
- Kharghar: Divya Kripa
- Koparkhairane: St. Francis de Sales
- Nerul: Our Lady of the Visitation
- Panvel: St. Francis Xavier
- Rasayani: Christ the King
- Sanpada: Good Shepherd
- Uran: Our Lady of the Purification
- Vashi: Sacred Heart

== Raigad Deanery ==
- Alibag: Mary of Nazareth
- Karjat: Our Lady of Fatima
- Khopoli: Holy Redeemer
- Korlai: Our Lady of Mt. Carmel
- Mahad: St. Francis Xavier
- Roha: Sacred Heart
