= Acharya Atre Nagar monorail station =

Mumbai Monorail station

Acharya Atre Nagar

General information
- Location: Shaikh Mishree Marg, Antop Hill, Mumbai
- Coordinates: 19.023780°N 72.863810°E
- System: monorail station
- Owner: Mumbai Metropolitan Region Development Authority (MMRDA)
- Line: (Mumbai Monorail)
- Tracks: 2

Construction
- Structure type: Elevated
- Parking: No
- Cycle facilities: No

History
- Opened: 3 March 2019; 7 years ago

Passengers
- 2019: 1000 daily

Services
Preceding station	Mumbai Monorail	Following station
Antop Hill towards Chembur	Line 1	Wadala Bridge towards Sant Gadge Maharaj Chowk
Route map
- Sources: Google Maps
Location
- Location within Mumbai

Acharya Atre Nagar is a monorail station on Line 1 of the Mumbai Monorail located at KP Munot Nagar in the Antop Hill suburb of Mumbai, India. Lies on the Shaikh Mishree Marg which locates at Antop Hill.
