= Sacred Heart Boys High School =

Secondary school in Mumbai, India

Information
- School type: Secondary school
- Religious affiliation: Catholicism
- Established: 1939; 87 years ago
- Founder: Father Alvarez
- Gender: Boys

Sacred Heart Boys' High School is a government aided high school for boys, affiliated to the Maharashtra Secondary School Certificate (SSC) Board. It is located on S. V. Road in Santa Cruz (West), Mumbai, India. The school was founded by Father Alvarez in 1939. Students come from all surrounding society, partly encouraged by the low cost education provided by Catholic priests of the Bombay diocese. The school gives importance to all religions and customs. Landmarks near the school include the Willingdon Catholic Gymkhana, St. Teresa's Convent High School and Ramkrishna Mission hospital. Around 2000 students study in this school every year.

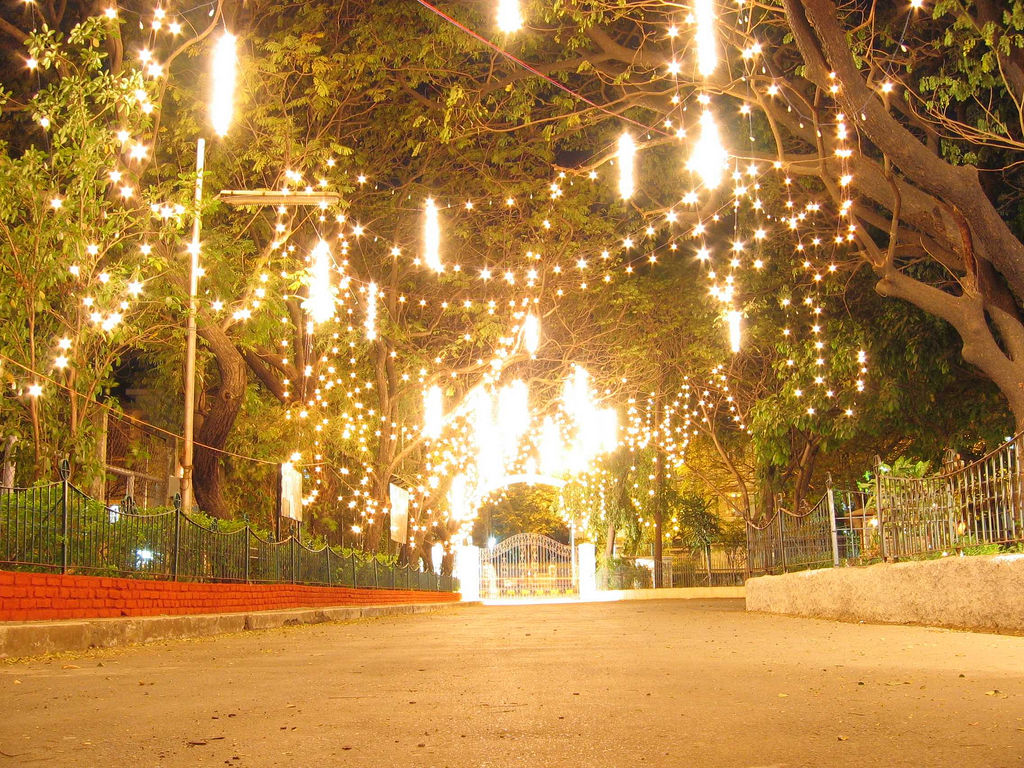
The school is decorated every December to commemorate Christmas

The Sacred Heart Church, a Victorian mid-sized Catholic church that caters to parish members of Santacruz (west) is located on same premises as the school. The church is built in the shape of a cross with mezzanine floors in the left and right arms. Stained glass windows adorn the church entrances. Towards the west gate of the campus and close to the church is a grotto frequented by people of all faiths.

== Infrastructure ==
The school has two sections:

- Primary Section - Including Jr. K.G., Sr. K.G. and 1st to 4th Standards
- Secondary section - Standards 5th to 10th.

The E-library can seat up to 65 students and is only open during the E-LIBRARY period.

The school has a Science laboratory accommodating 30 students at a time; The lab is on the second floor along with class rooms and next to the computer lab. Staff rooms are situated on the all floor of the old building and on the first floor of the new building.

The computer lab is situated near the school office. It can accommodate up to 30 students at a time

It has a auditorium. In the main stone structure on the second floor where skits, plays elocution competitions and the likes are staged is referred to as the "School Hall", The auditorium also hosts private wedding receptions, which are a source of revenue for the school.

The school has a approximately 187.5 metre-long playground that is used for football and athletics. There is also a tarmac area in front of the old school building and adjacent to the playground, which, though not meant for basketball, etc. if often used for playing them.

The Parish house (Rectory) and office is situated between the main school building and the new school building. The school does not have a resident doctor or a trained paramedic in the campus but medical facilities are available within 200 meters of the school campus.

The school has an AV room situated on the second floor near the "School Hall". It can situate 70-75 students at a time.

The school launched the Sacred Heart International School, a co-ed school under the Cambridge International Curriculum from the 2016-17 academic year.

== Activities ==
The school has a large play ground where it hosts its annual sporting event. Inter division football matches and mass drill are also conducted on the school grounds. The school ground, although not a public playground, is open for school children to play after school hours.

On Wednesdays, the school conducts mass drill for around 2000 students assemble for around half an hour. Every week the school band remove drums from the sports store room and set it up and beat it while the exercises are done. The school also conducts prayers on the stone ground on alternate days of week (except Saturday) .

== Principals ==
- Fr. Alvarez
- Fr. Rodrigues
- Fr. Bento
- Fr. T. Pereira
- Fr. Ferdinand Fonseca - Now Bishop Fredinand Fonseca
- Fr. Richard Mathias
- Fr. Herculan Silvera
- Fr. Nereus Rodrigues
- Fr. Rodney Esperance
- Fr. Tony D'souza
- Fr. Felix Naronha
- Fr. Milton Gonsalves
- Fr. Ivan Mascarenhas
- Fr. Abel Fernandez
- Fr. Thomson Kinny
- Miss. Priscilla Pereira

== Notable alumni ==
- Sunny Deol – Celebrated actor
- Manish Malhotra - Fashion designer
- Vice Admiral Abhay Raghunath Karve (Retd) (Former Commander-in-Chief Indian Navy)
- Vinod Mehra - Bollywood actor
- Ravi Chopra - Bollywood Producer and Director
- Dinesh Vijan - Bollywood Producer and Director

== In popular media ==
Several Bollywood films have been shot on the school campus most notable being;

- Jagriti (1954) - The football scene in the film was shot on campus.
- Coolie - 1983.
- Mr. India 1987, depicts Anil Kapoor receiving his two children featured in the first half. The scene was shot on the school premises during the lunch hour.
- Qayamat Se Qayamat Tak 1988 - The start of the library scene was shot in front of the church adjoining the school campus.
- Khoon Bhari Maang 1988 - where Aarti's (Rekha's) son was shown to be studying.
- Ishq Vishk 2003 - The school premises were used to depict a college.
