= Antop Hill monorail station =

Antop Hill

General information
- Location: Shaikh Misree Marg, C.G.S. colony, Sector 6, Antop Hill, Mumbai
- Coordinates: 19.030203°N 72.866988°E
- System: monorail station
- Owner: Mumbai Metropolitan Region Development Authority (MMRDA)
- Line: Line 1
- Tracks: 2

Construction
- Structure type: Elevated
- Parking: No
- Cycle facilities: No

History
- Opened: 3 March 2019; 7 years ago

Passengers
- 2019: 1000 daily

Services
Preceding station	Mumbai Monorail	Following station
Guru Tegh Bahadur Nagar towards Chembur	Line 1	Acharya Atre Nagar towards Sant Gadge Maharaj Chowk
Route map
- Sources: Google Maps
Location
- Location within Mumbai

Antop Hill is a monorail station on Line 1 of the Mumbai Monorail locates near CGS Colony in the Antop Hill suburb of Mumbai, India. Lies on the Shaikh Mishree Marg. There is demand for renaming Antop Hill monorail station to Shaikh Mishree Marg monorail station as it would become more relatable.
