= Church of Our Lady of Dolours, Wadala =

Roman Catholic church in Mumbai, India

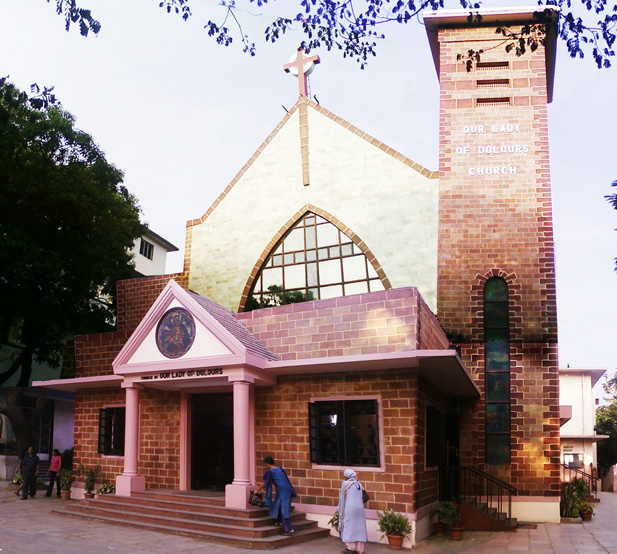
Church entrance

The Church of Our Lady of Dolours, Wadala is a Roman Catholic church in Mumbai, India, built in 1853. The parish of Our Lady of Dolours with its school, St. Joseph's was entrusted to the Salesians in 1948, about the same time as the Salesians settled in Matunga. The school was co-ed until the Salesian Sisters came into the Wadala Village with the Auxilium Convent for girls. The centerpiece of the church is a statue of the Pieta.

The parish extends till Kings Circle fly-over in the North, Naigaum, Sahakar Nagar and Kidwai Nagar in the South, Hindu Colony/Ruia College in the West and the Harbour Branch Railway line including the Reynold's Road, BPT Quarters in the East. These geographical boundaries were drawn after the parish of St. Dominic Savio, Antop Hill was carved out of Our Lady of Dolours church in 1981.

Most parishioners are concentrated in the Wadala Village, Sahakar Nagar, the Catholic Colony and Don Bosco Hsg. Society, Kidwai Nagar, Madhav Nagar, David Barretto Road, Katrak Road and CGS Quarters. Most, especially the original inhabitants of Wadala and Gowari Villages are Bombay East Indians. The rest hail mainly from Goa and Mangalore. These were able to come into Wadala largely because of the buildings built by the Salesians for Catholics.

As of 2014 the parish priest was Fr.Godfrey D'Sa, SDB, Assistant Parish priest Fr.Vivian D'zouza, SDB, administrator Fr. Sanjay Lopes, SDB. The principal of St.Joseph's High School was Fr.Bernard Fernandes, SDB.

== History ==
Wadala was once a wilderness with nothing more than a few villages amidst marshy fields and salt pans. In 1853, Fr. J. Braz Fernandes, Vicar of Our Lady of Salvation Church, Dadar, built a small chapel dedicated to Nossa Senhora das Dores (Our Lady of Dolours) to cater to the needs of the Catholics of Wadala, Govari, Naigaum, Matunga, Antop Hill, Dadar, Sewri, Customs and BPT Quarters.

In 1936 the chapel was replaced by a church, whose cornerstone was laid on 1 November 1936, and the church was blessed on 17 October 1937 by Msgr. Charles Ghezzi SJ, Administrator Apostolic of the Archdiocese of Bombay. The first mass in the newly built church was offered by him with several priests (including former chaplains) concelebrating. On 12 March 1941, the parish of Our Lady of Dolours, Wadala was carved out from the parish of Our Lady of Salvation, Dadar. The first parish priest of the new church was Fr. Augusto Fernandes. On 22 August 1948, the parish of Our Lady of Dolours with the newly built school was entrusted to the Salesians of Don Bosco who had just established themselves near Kings Circle, a little more than a kilometer away. This was the first parish run by the Salesians in the Archdiocese. Fr. Edward Rego was appointed the first Salesian parish priest and principal of St. Joseph's School. He rebuilt St. Joseph's School and raised it to the level of a high school in 1955.

In 1981 the church of St. Dominic Savio was built in the heart of the Antop Hill slums. It was carved out of the mother parish, Our Lady of Dolours. In 1985 the community of Salesians at Our Lady of Dolours Church was given canonical status and Fr. Olivio Miranda was the first Rector-Parish Priest. The work on the church structure that was in urgent need of repairs started on 27 January 1994 and was completed in 1996.

The relic of Don Bosco was displayed at Our Lady of Dolours Church on 13 August 2011. The relic was taken on a worldwide pilgrimage as part of the preparation for his bicentenary celebrations.

== Priests belonging the parish and school. ==
- Fr. Godfrey D'sa SDB
- Fr.Ivo Coehlo SDB
- Fr. Crispino D'souza SDB
- Fr.Roy Noronha SDB

There are many educational institutions and Service Centers around the parish church.

== Catholic institutions and service centers ==
- St. Joseph's High School-Wadala,
- Don Bosco High School-Matunga,
- Auxilium Convent-Wadala,
- Mazzarello Youth Welfare Centre-Wadala,
- Don Bosco Youth Services,
- Don Bosco Recruitment Services,
- Tejprasarini,
- Tej Kiran Studio,
- Bosco Information Service,
- Prafulta Counselling Centre,
- Amar Media Communication Center,
- Anmol Shelter for Street Girls,
- Shelter Don Bosco,
- Shelter Don Bosco Research and Documentation Centre,
- Shrine of Mary Help of Christians,
- Salesian Provincial House and Development Office.
