= Chunabhatti railway station =

Railway station in Mumbai, Maharashtra, India

Chunabhatti

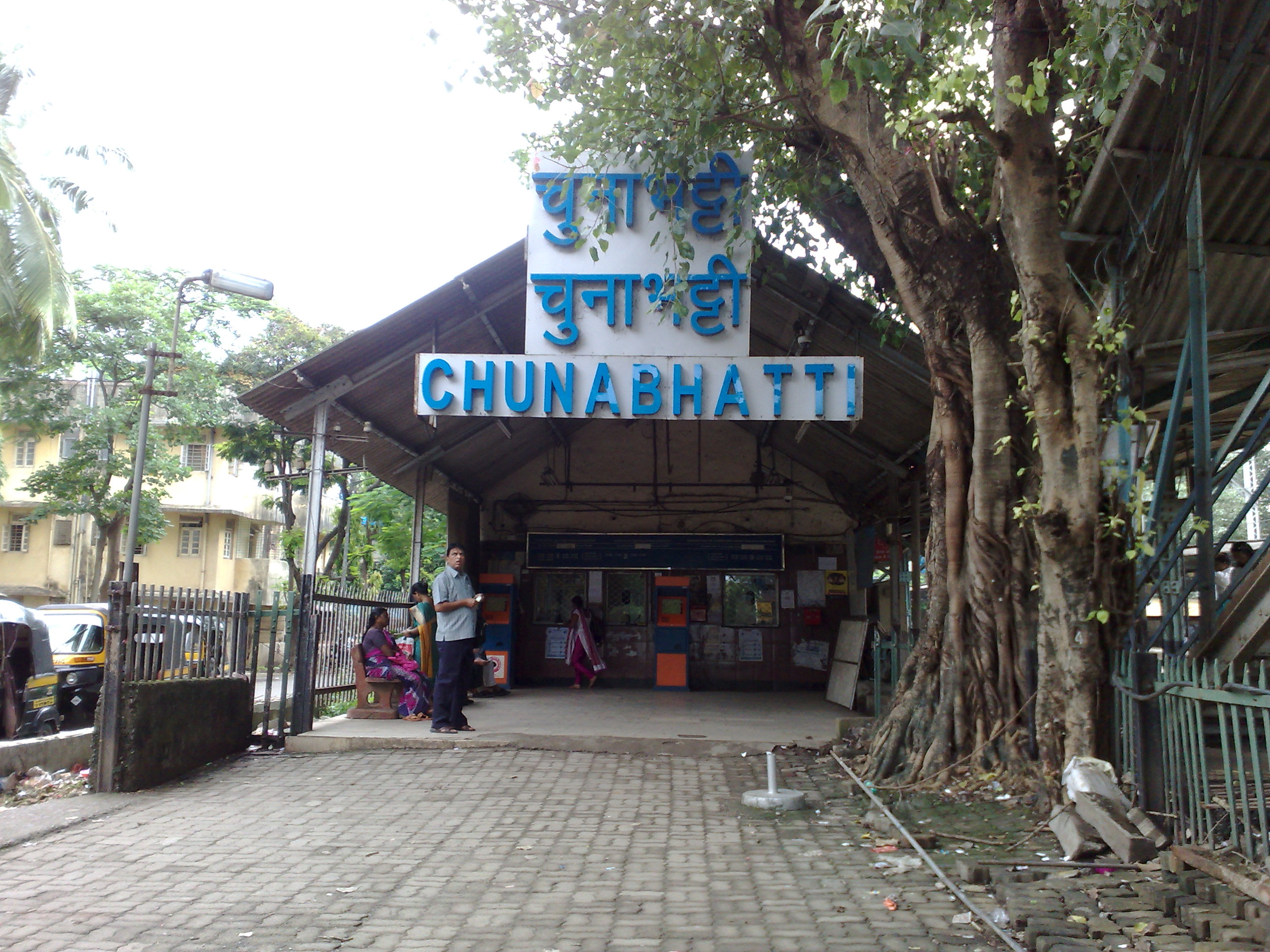

General information
- Coordinates: 19.051652°N 72.869053°E
- System: Mumbai Suburban Railway station
- Owner: Ministry of Railways, Indian Railways
- Line: Harbour Line
- Platforms: 2
- Tracks: 2

Construction
- Structure type: Standard on-ground station
- Platform levels: On ground

Other information
- Status: Active
- Station code: CHF
- Fare zone: Central Railways

Services
Preceding station	Mumbai Suburban Railway	Following station
Guru Tegh Bahadur Nagar towards Chhatrapati Shivaji Terminus	Harbour line	Kurla towards Panvel
Route map
Location
- Location within India Location within Maharashtra Location within Mumbai

Chunabhatti is a railway station on the Harbour Line of the Mumbai Suburban Railway.

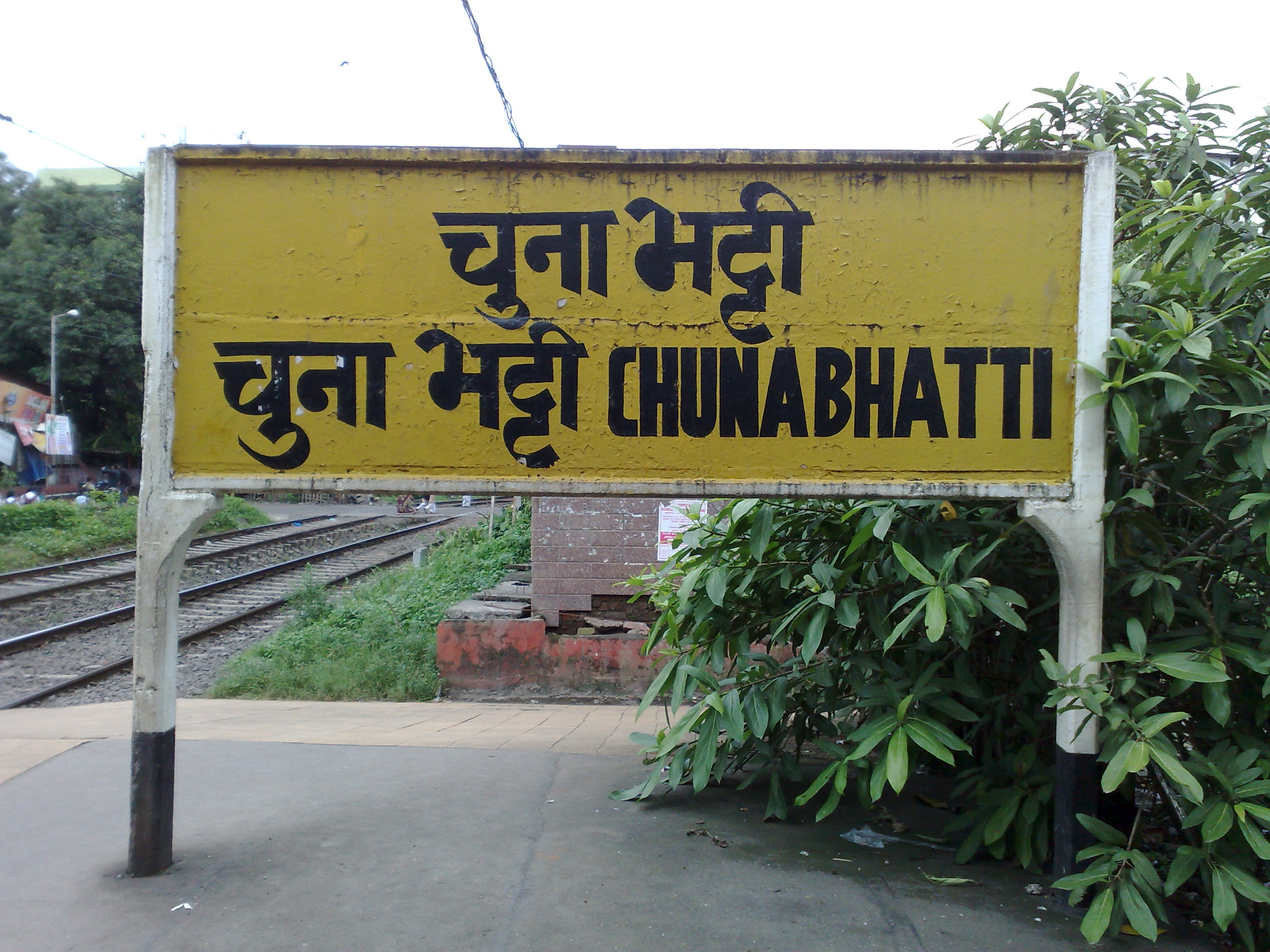
Chunabhatti stationboard

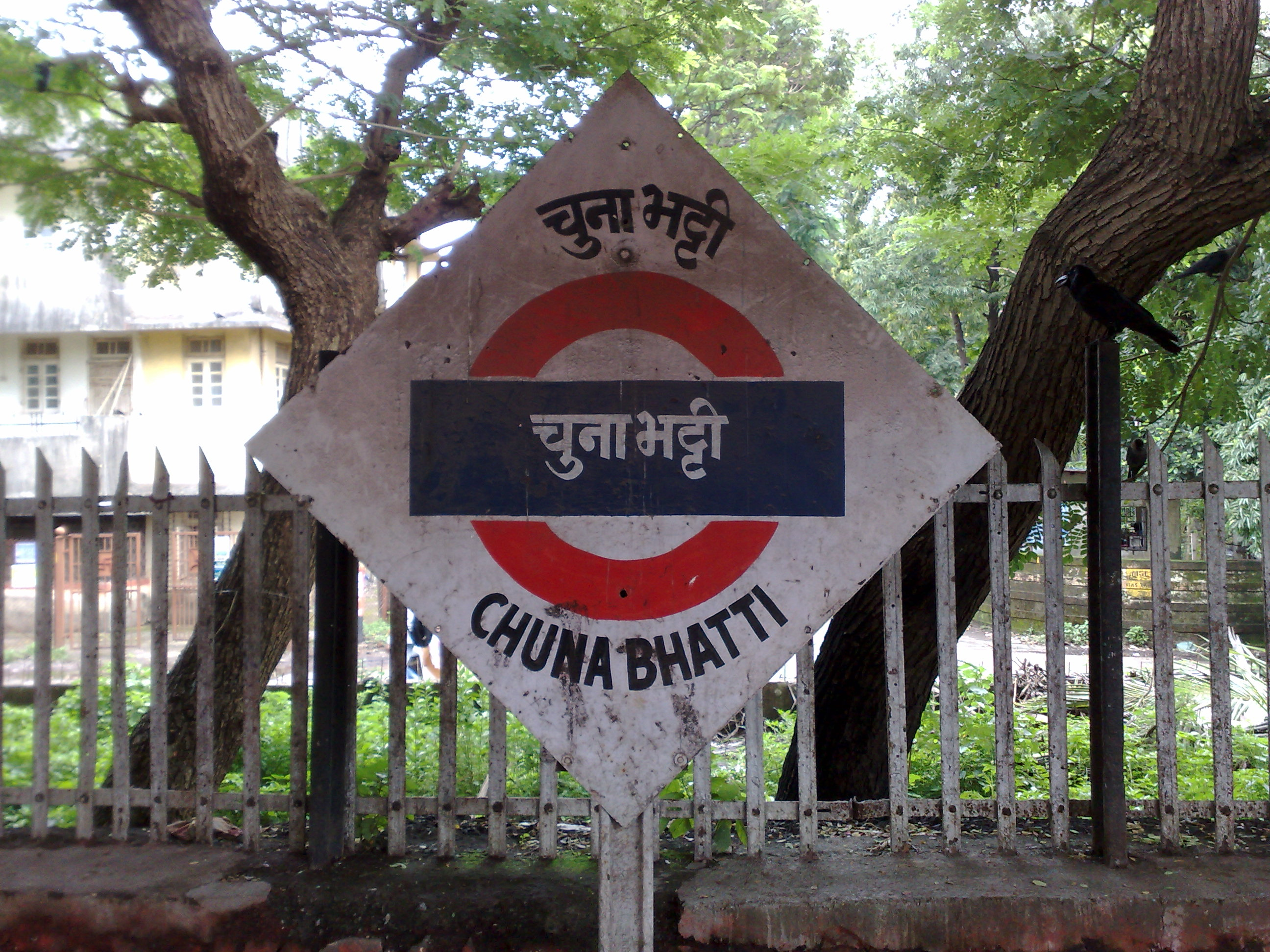
Chunabhatti platformboard
