= R. N. Podar School =

- Santacruz, Mumbai, Maharashtra, India

Information
- Type: Private Day school
- Motto: Nurturing the future. Since 1927
- Established: 1998
- Principal: Avnita Bir
- Grades: 1 - 12
- Gender: Co-educational
- Affiliation: CBSE
- Website: www.rnpodarschool.com

Ramniranjan Podar Senior Secondary School, also known as R N Podar School, is a private school located in the Santacruz West neighbourhood of Mumbai, Maharashtra, India. It is a day school with morning and afternoon shifts. The school has 2,700 students and is affiliated to the CBSE. It is a front runner in the reforms process, a case study at IIM Ahmedabad and a pilot for policy initiatives of CBSE. The Director-Principal of the school is Avnita Bir.

== History ==
School building

RN Podar was established in 1927 in Bombay City, Bombay Presidency, British India. The Podar Education Network (incorporated in 1927) educates 50,000 students through 40 schools across India. Some other institutes established by the society in Mumbai include Lilavatibai Podar High School (ICSE), Podar International School (IB), Podar World College, Podar International School (SSC) and Podar Prep.

== Achievements and academics ==
=== Academics ===
In the class 12 AISSCE board examinations (2012–13), 62.9% of the school's students secured an overall percentage of over 90%, while 32.4% fared in the range of 80-90%.

=== Sports and Co-curriculars ===
The school's football team starred in a promotion bid to division III of Mumbai School Sports Association under 16 tournament in 2012, the first time in five years. Also, the under 14 team were ranked 2nd in division III subsequently qualifying for div II. In a national level essay writing competition "Gurutsav" organised by CBSE on the eve of teacher's day, two students from the secondary section, having lost, got their essays published in an e-book.

== Microsoft Mentor School ==
Microsoft has conferred the school with the ‘Microsoft Mentor School Award’ globally which included the principal's participation at the Partners in Learning Global Forum 2014 in Spain. The award recognizes schools that are using cutting-edge technology to improve student outcomes.

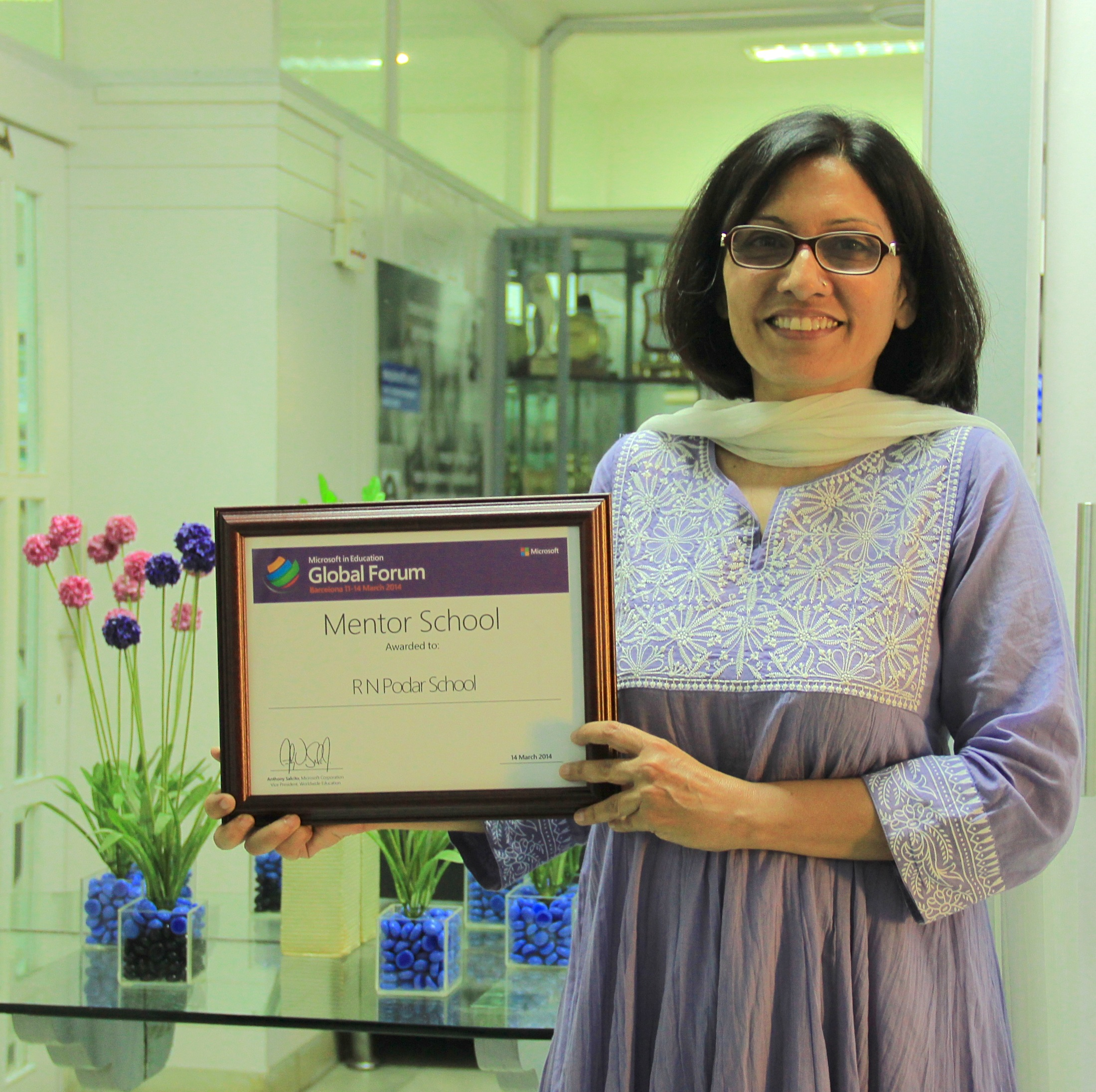
Principal Mrs. Avnita Bir with Microsoft Mentor School Award Certificate.

== Ashoka Changemaker School ==
Ashoka Innovators for Public, as a part of its global initiative "Changemaker Schools program" has selected R. N. Podar School (CBSE) as a changemaker school. The chief motive of this initiative is to bring together the best practices and innovations on a common platform thereby facilitating a greater collaboration, both locally and globally. The school's impact on social as well as academic fronts has been acknowledged.

== Education World Ranking 2015 ==
The school has been ranked as No. 1 day school on the category of Leadership, Management & Academic reputation, in the Education World India School Rankings 2015.

== See also ==
- List of schools in Mumbai
