= Mysore cafe =

Mysore Cafe
- Interactive map of Mysore Cafe

Restaurant information
- Established: 1934
- Food type: South Indian, Udupi, Vegetarian
- Location: 461, Durlabh Nivas, Bhaudaji Road, Matunga, Mumbai, Maharashtra, India

Mysore Café is a South Indian Mysuru restaurant in Kings Circle, Matunga, Mumbai. The restaurant was established in the 1930s and has been a popular meeting and eating joint for many generations. The restaurant is popular with students as it has a number of educational institutions close by.

== Establishment ==
Mysore Cafè was founded by A.Rama Nayak was born in the village of Akkar, Mangalore, Karnataka

Mysore café was established in the 1930s, Choosing a vantage spot near the King's circle railway station, he started making and selling idlis and dosas on plantain leaves. A few years later, he set up his first restaurant selling south Indian cuisine in Matunga. Subsequently, he set up another three restaurants in the same area of Matunga, a suburb that had a sizeable population of South Indians. These four restaurants (one for each of his sons) were named Udupi Shri Krishna (near Matunga station, now called Udupi Krishna Bhavan), Cafe Mysore (at Kings Circle), Udupi Cafe and now Idli House. Café Mysore is located at 461, Durlabh Nivas, Bhaudaji Road, Matunga while the remaining family run restaurants are all located close by in the Matunga region.

== Popular clientele ==
The restaurant is popular with students of nineteen colleges that lie in the vicinity. The Raj Kapoor family used to frequent the restaurants when they lived close by in the 1950s and 60s and a letter from Raj Kapoor is still displayed at one of the restaurants. In an interview with Rajdeep Sardesai in 2017, the Indian industrialist Mukesh Ambani said that his favourite food was idli sambar and his favourite restaurant remains Mysore Café where he used to eat as a student at UDCT from 1974 to 1979.
