= Avnita Bir =

Indian educator

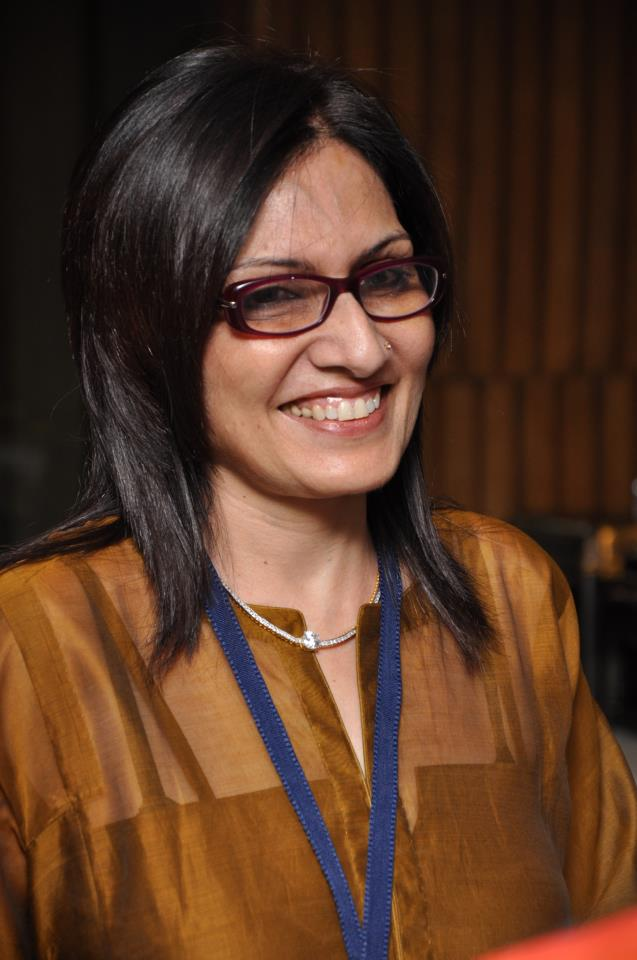
- Bir at LearnShift India, 2012
- Born: 31 October 1957 (age 68); Amritsar, Punjab, India
- Education: LSR, Delhi Uni. DSE, Delhi Uni.
- Occupation: Principal of R. N. Podar School
- Board member of: Governing Board, CBSE
- Awards: National Award for Teachers (India) (2009) Koh Boon Hwee Scholars Award (Inspirational Mentorship)(2013)

Avnita Bir is an Indian educator and economist. She is the principal of the R. N. Podar School in Mumbai, Maharashtra. She has worked in the Indian education system for more than 15 years, and she was a curator for Learn Shift India 2012, a conference held in Delhi that was aimed at exchanging ideas on transforming Indian education. In the early years of her career, she was appointed to give special lessons in Economics to the children (Rahul Gandhi and Priyanka Vadra) of the late Prime Minister, Rajiv Gandhi.

== Education ==
Avnita Singh parmar was born in Amritsar, Punjab, India on 31 October 1957 into a Punjabi Hindu Khatri family. She graduated from Lady Shri Ram College for Women, University of Delhi before moving to the Delhi school of economics to obtain her post graduate education in economics. She also passed the University Grants Commission (India) (NET) examination for professorship in economics. She also took part in many conferences and workshops related to teaching and learning, at places including Harvard Graduate school of economics and IIM Ahmedabad.

== Career ==
Bir has worked with educational institutions of India, including Mallya Aditi International School, Hyderabad Public School and several others, as head of the department and as a coordinator, before joining Podar as a principal.

== Recognition ==
Bir has won awards including the EQFI India Education Awards 2008 for Excellence in Education from the Education Quality Foundation of India and Educational Leadership Award in 2011 by ICS. She has been a member on the board of education reforms committee of Kapil Sibal and later, had been appointed as a member of the governing body of CBSE India. She was featured in newspapers, magazines and bulletins conducted by news channels like NDTV which concentrated on education and other issues related to students. She has been selected for Kon Boon Hwee Scholars award (2013) for the inspirational mentorship she has offered. Additionally she is one of 80 educators selected by Microsoft for their Mentor School program, which was held in Barcelona, Spain. FICCI FLO conferred on her the Outstanding Woman Achiever Award in the year of 2014 for her contributions in the field of education. She was a presenter and a co-panelist, representing India at Google Education Symposium organised at Mountain View, California, November 2014.

At around the same time in 2016, acknowledging the pivotal role she played in the fields of Technology and Education, she was appointed a member in the advisory board of Google's Global.Edu, a global initiative to bring on-board various leaders, educators, teachers and students for transforming education. In 2023, she was conferred the Lokmani Lal lifetime excellence award by Maharshi Patanjali Vidya Mandir, an award to recognise and honour exceptional teachers from across the country.

She has co-authored two books on economics.
