= Maheshwari Udyan, Mumbai =

Park in Mumbai, India

Coordinates: 19.026734°N 72.855341°E

Maheshwari Udyan is a park in Matunga, Mumbai. It was originally known as King's Circle (until 1962). It was named after George V, the King-Emperor. Morarji Desai, then Union Finance minister of India, laid the foundation stone on 3 February 1962 to commemorate the name change.

The former name of the park lends its name to King's Circle station of Harbour line of Mumbai suburban railway. The area surrounding the park is still called King’s Circle by locals.

The part of the road that leads to Chhatrapati Shivaji Terminus was originally called Vincent Road. It was later changed to Dr. Ambedkar Road. King's Circle station and Matunga railway station are next to each other, the former on the Harbour Line and the latter on the Central Line.

Located very close to King's Circle station is South Indian Education Society High School, one of Mumbai's oldest schools. King's Circle is also central to places such as Koliwada, Wadala or Vadala, Sion, Dadar and C.G.S. Colony (Antop Hill). It also features the popular restaurant Mysore cafe.

For several decades, Matunga and Sion were the roads terminal points. Beyond them was a marshy land mass unsuitable for habitation. All construction was taking place in South Mumbai. Land was reclaimed from the sea and made available for building sites.

Maheshwari Udyan is on the road. It passes through various flyovers reaching Thane Depot. From this Udyan, one can go by walk to western part of Matunga. The Railway workshop one small length bylane foot bridge, (Local folks call this lane 'Monkey bridge') which connects Matunga East to Matunga west.

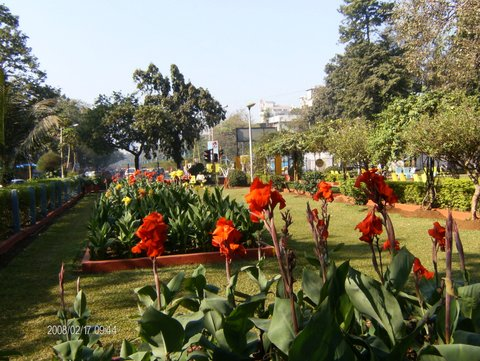
Prior to flyover construction

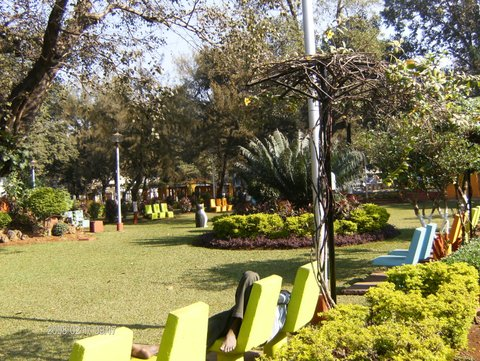
Maheshwari Udyan

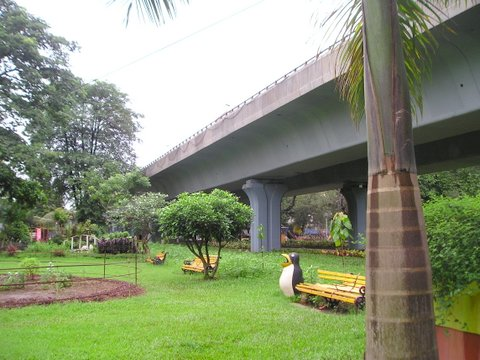
A flyover connecting CST to Thane Pass through the Maheshwari Udyan (2012)

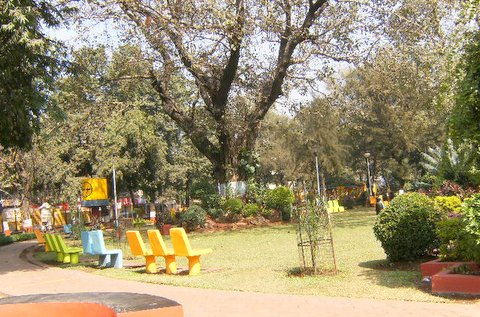
Garden
