= St. Andrew's Church, Mumbai =

St. Andrews Church
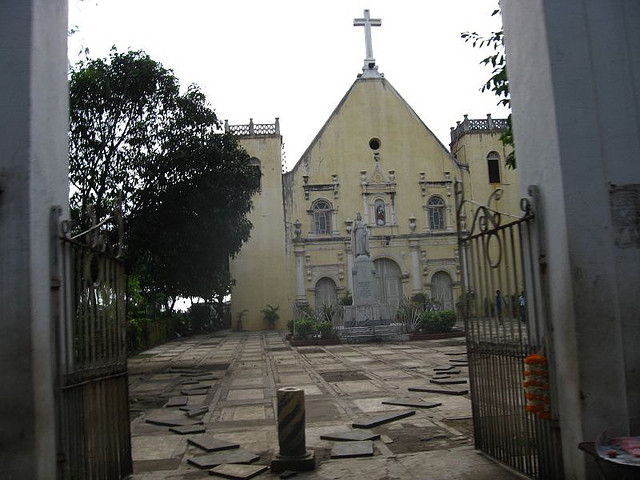
- St. Andrews Church
- 19°3′18″N 72°49′28″E
- Location: 115, Hill Road, Bandra West, Mumbai 400050.
- Country: India
- Denomination: Roman Catholic
- Website: https://standrewchurch.in/

History
- Status: Roman Catholic Church
- Founded: 1575; 451 years ago
- Founder: Society of Jesus
- Dedicated: 1616

Architecture
- Functional status: Active
- Heritage designation: Urban Heritage Award
- Designated: 2002
- Architect: Rev. F. Manuel Gomes
- Architectural type: Portuguese-style façade
- Construction cost: ₹45,354

Administration
- Diocese: Archdiocese of Bombay
- Deanery: Bandra Deanery

Clergy
- Archbishop: His Excellency, Archbishop John Rodrigues
- Priest(s): Fr. Nigel Barret (Parish Priest); Fr. Jervis D'souza; Fr. Clifford D'souza; Fr. Bosco Remedios; Fr. Magi Murzello

St. Andrew's Church is one of the oldest churches in Mumbai. It was originally built by Portuguese Jesuits in 1575. It stands on the sea-shore of the Bandra suburb of Mumbai, and was the only church there till the first quarter of the 17th century.

== History ==
In 1534, the island of Salsette containing Bandra, came under Portuguese rule. In 1568, Bandra was assigned to the Portuguese Jesuits. At first, the Jesuits made hardly any progress in their evangelical mission, until Brother Manoel Gomes, the Apostle of Salcette, arrived. With his knowledge of local language and customs, by 1580, two thousand persons were baptized and this number multiplied from year to year till in 1603, practically the whole of Bandra was Catholic.

In 1575, a church, described as the "biggest and best of all those in the island of Salcette", was being built through the generosity of "a wealthy lady of good social standing". There is evidence gathered from the indulgence granted to the faithful by Pope Clement VIII that the Hermitage of St. Andrew existed in 1601. In the 400 (and counting) years, the Church withstood natural disasters and political turmoil. In 1618, a cyclone blew off the entire roof. It was closed just once between 1740 and 1749 during the Maratha invasion. Thereafter, the secular clergy took charge and the Church has continued to evolve to the present day. After the engineered blow-up by the British, to save Bandra's first church, the Church of Santa Anna from the Maratha invasion, in 1739, the Church of St. Andrew was the only church left to administer to the spiritual needs of the Catholics of Bandra. This was a vast area extending in the north as far as Juhu and included Santa Cruz and Khar, till about 1853. After this date, Bandra acquired the rest of the churches in the Bandra Deanery.

While St Andrew Church was being built in Bombay, there was much back and forth over the steeple. The Bishop of Calcutta and the government of Bombay objected to its installation because that would give it the "character of an established church". However, the church session argued against this "slight" pointing out that Muslims, Hindus and Pagans of every caste and colour may raise temples and minarets and spires, that lift themselves to the clouds, without asking the consent of the Government."

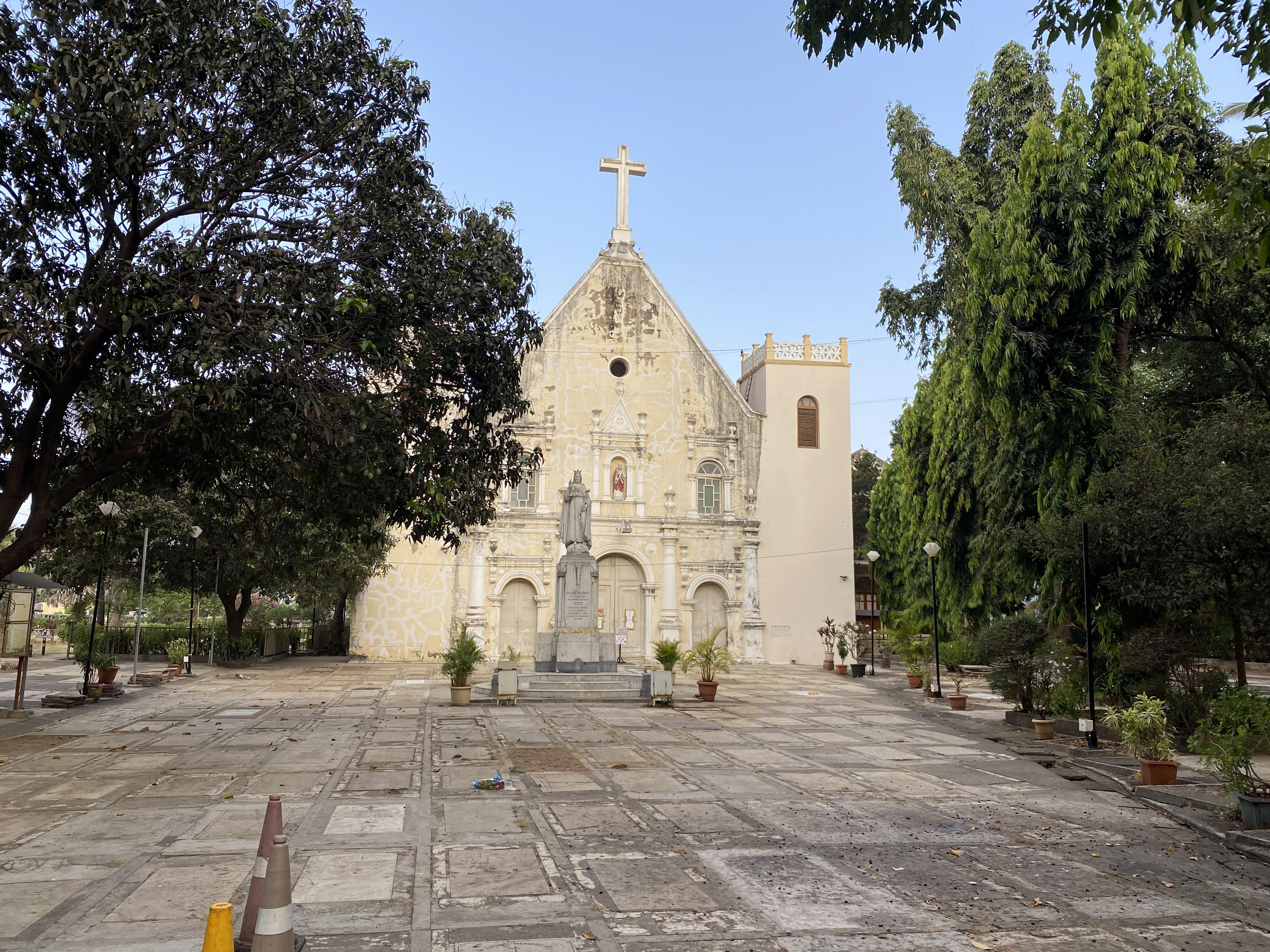
Exterior view of the St. Andrew's Church, Bandra

Kolis were originally part of the Church of St Anne, but according to a 1669 Jesuit letter, the parish grew too large and unwieldy. Also, some parishioners objected to the fish smell so the Kolis were given their own parish. Then in 1739, Salsette was taken over by the Marathas and St Anne and its surrounding fortifications were blown up so they wouldn't fall into enemy hands. From 1739 until St Peter's was built in 1853, St Andrew's was Bandra's only church. In 1966, the church's wooden portico was demolished and the building's facade was extended. Every effort was taken to ensure that it resembled the original.

Even the height of a round window in the facade, just above the statue of St Andrew, was maintained so that on both equinoxes, the sun's morning rays would continue to shine on the keystone of the arch above the sanctuary exactly at 7.00am - just like in the original design. This phenomenon was first noticed by Mr. Carlisle Curry, who watched it for a few years and documented it. In 1989 he published a booklet describing the phenomenon.

Currently a building that was built east of the church obstructs the early morning sunlight entering the Church but the sun's rays do shine into the church a bit later in the morning and; on the days before and after the equinoxes, the sunlight falls on the altar tabernacle.

== Description ==
The high altar of the church extends almost to the roof, and carries statues of Sacred Heart, Our Lady and St Andrew. Smaller statues of St John the Baptist, St Sebastian and the Bom Jesu are above the main statues. The 16th-century wood side altars were carved and painted in popular Portuguese style. The church also has 16th-century hanging wood panels depicting the Resurrection of the Christ and the Assumption of Mother Mary, and a 16th-century pulpit. One of the largest and oldest stone crosses in Mumbai is in its compound. This stone cross is carved from a single stone. Originally installed at the older Church of St. Anne, it was moved. The Maratha Army destroyed the church during the invasion of the settlement. The Church of St. Anne was formerly at the site of the current Bandra Bus Depot.

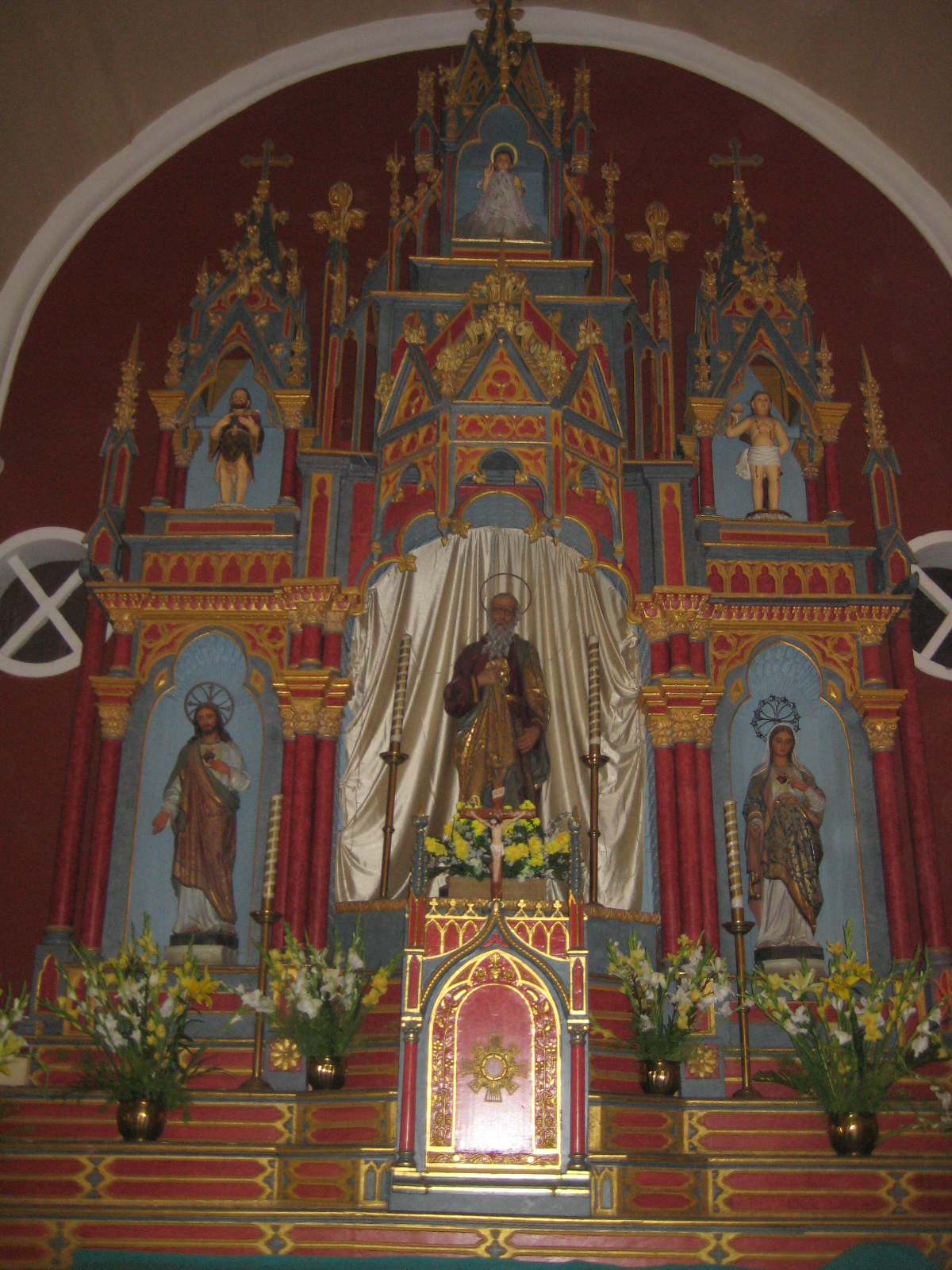
The main altar

A small round aperture in the center of the front facade of the building, just above the statue of St Andrew, allows the rising sun to shine into the church.

St Andrew Church houses a mini-museum in the choir loft. The church conducts regular masses every day.

On either side of the façade the two towers which originally flanked it were demolished and new ones, having stained glass windows were built with the new façade when the church was extended. The base of the north tower now accommodates the stairway to the choir. The base of the other tower houses the Baptistery whose stained glass window has been recently restored. The bell that was first kept in the window facing east is the oldest. It bears the inscription “SANTO ANDRE DE BANDORA 1793” round the outside of the rim and on the body is a cross in an oval. It was used to announce deaths, arrival of funerals at the church and on All Souls Day. The bell that was kept in the window facing north, has the inscription partly in Portuguese and partly in English: “SANTO ANDRE DE BANDORA 1900”. This was used for the Angelus and to summon the faithful to services and on festive occasions. The largest bell in the center of the Belfry is of more recent origin being presented in 1934 by Sir Dominic Joseph Fereira, K.C.S.S. in memory of his wife Josephine. It was cast by Gogossen Von Humpert, Brilon, and was used daily at 8.30 p.m. “to remind the faithful to pray for the departed souls, for the Angelus and on festive occasions”. All three bells are now in the new north tower.

== Mother of Pearl ==
The 1669 Jesuit letter mentions a curious legend about a Mother Mary statue in one of the side altars. "Once upon a time, the Kolis were fishing in this sea of Bandra," reads the translation.

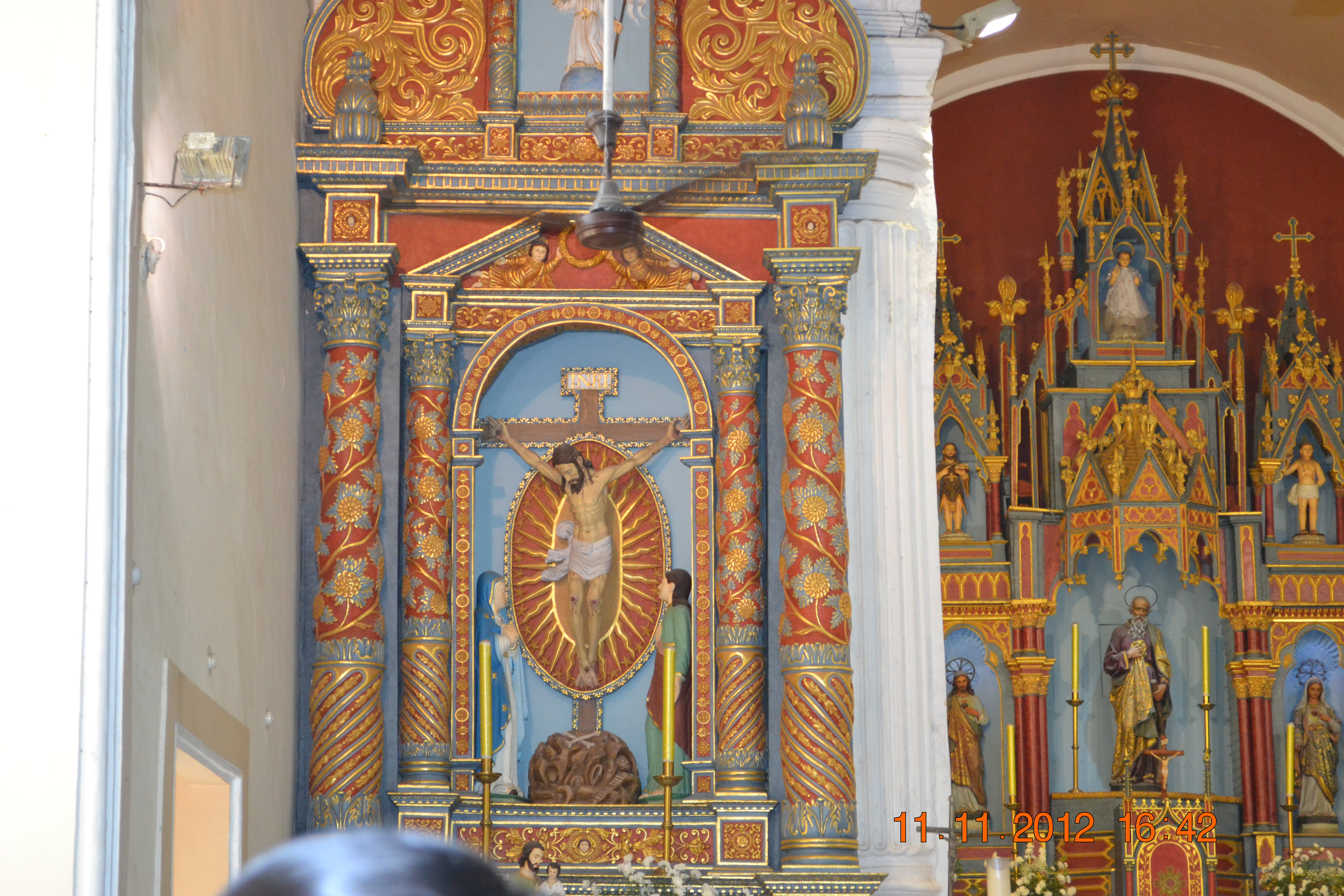
Side View of the Altar

"They fished not a fish but a statue of the Mother of Pearl, within which the pearl Jesus was found and with festival joy placed it in this church." The side altars are originals - so it's possible the current statue is the same one that was fished out of the sea. After remaining for a time in St. Andrew's church, was restored to its former position in 1761, and has since been held in much veneration not only by Christians but by Hindus, Musalmans, and Parsis.

== Graveyard ==
The Graveyard of St. Andrew's which covers a very large area, was initially meant for the parishioners of St. Andrew's. However, in 1946, when parts of the Parish were sliced to form the parishes of St. Theresa's, St. Vincent de Paul's and St. Anne's, some of the parishioners so transferred still have a claim for burial in the graves of their ancestors in St. Andrew's graveyard. Due to non-availability of space, it is not possible to allot fresh permanent graves even to the existing parishioners of St. Andrew's whose numbers have increased tremendously. To meet the shortage, persons who do not have permanent graves are buried in temporary graves.

Vaulting of Graves: Section ‘B’ (area along Chimbai Road) needs to be re-planned as there are a number of overhanging trees which not only cause a cleaning problem but graves cannot be dug in the allotted space because of the spreading roots, resulting in problems of encroachment. Besides the passage in the corner is very narrow and gets waterlogged during the monsoons. It was therefore decided to vault the graves so that the area would be leveled up and easy to clean. Each grave holder is expected to defray part of the expenses by paying ₹2000.

In 1964 the graveyard was rearranged and the entire area divided into sections marked ‘A’, to ‘H’. Some of these sections were vaulted. Each permanent grave owner was issued a Registration Card giving the name of the grave-owner, the co-users and the grave number and section and a plan showing the location of the grave. It may be noted that while allotting a permanent grave, the property rights of the Church are not transferred but only the right of use of the particular grave is given to the family concerned, subject to the rules and regulations governing the graveyard. As regards temporary graves, permission is given for one particular burial and the family members have no right over the grave.

== From the archives of the East Indian Association Silver Jubilee ==
- Withstood the terrible cyclone of 1618
- Survived the Maratha invasion of 1739
- Underwent repairs in 1764
- Roof and ceiling renewed in 1823
- Surrounding wall built in 1862
- General repairs carried out. Paved with Marble, Porch added in 1890
- Main Altar rebuilt in 1900
- Roof renovated in 1931
- Front and side Compound walls rebuilt and gates replaced in 1934
- Monument of Christ the King erected in 1935
