= St. Jerome Church (Kashimira) =

- St. Jerome Church, kashimira
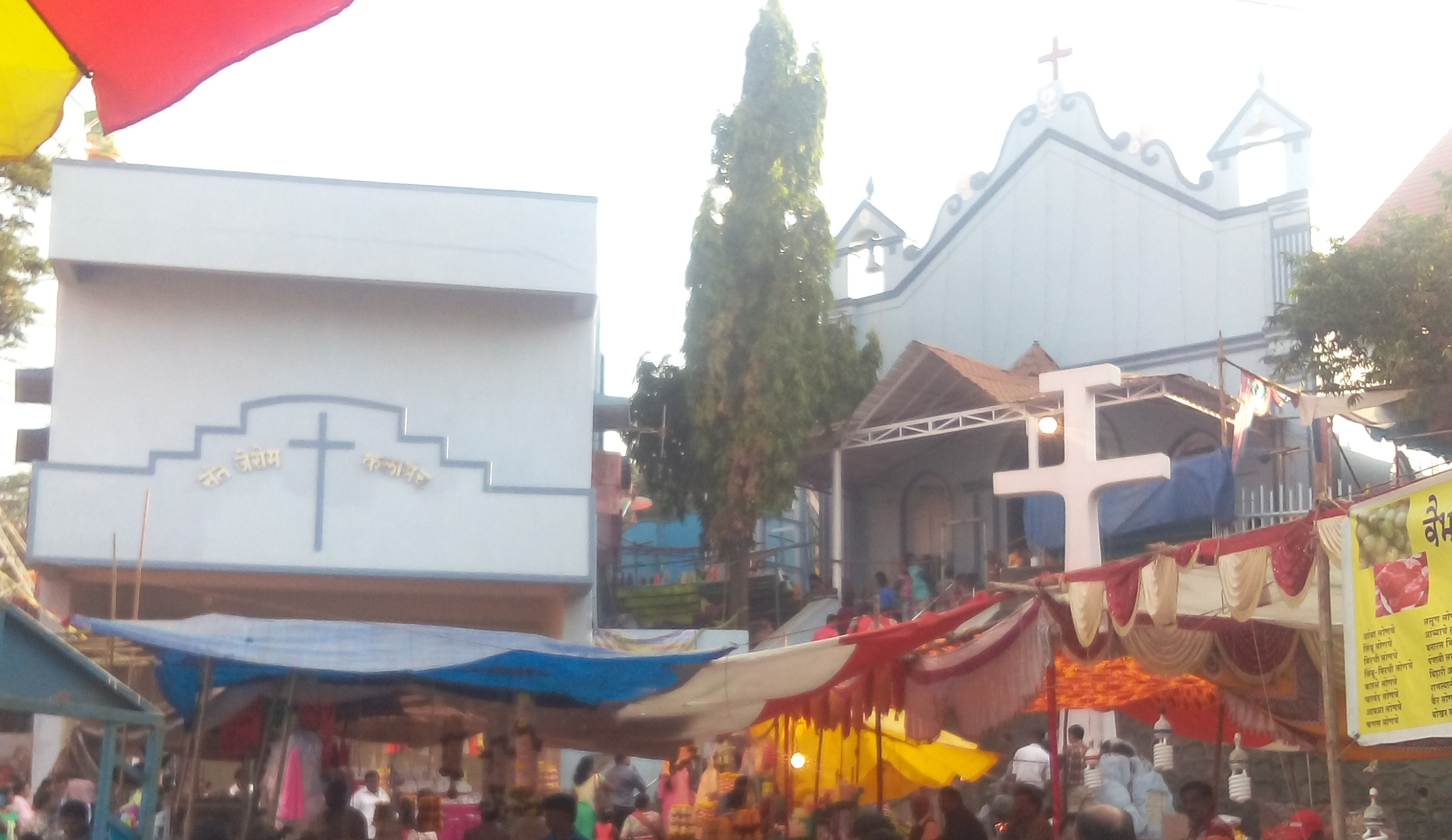
- St. Jerome Church
- 19°16′25.208″N 72°53′1.643″E
- Location: Mira Road, Mira-Bhayander
- Country: India
- Denomination: Roman Catholic
- Website: http://stjeromechurch.in/

History
- Status: Parish Church
- Founded: 1595; 431 years ago
- Events: 26th December St. Jerome Feast

Architecture
- Functional status: Active

Administration
- Archdiocese: Archdiocese of Bombay
- Deanery: Dharavi Deanery

Clergy
- Archbishop: Oswald Cardinal Gracias

St. Jerome Church is a Roman Catholic Church in Kashimira, Mira-Bhayandar, India. It was built during the Portuguese era by the Franciscan Fathers in 1595. It is situated on a hillock along the Western Express Highway.

== History ==
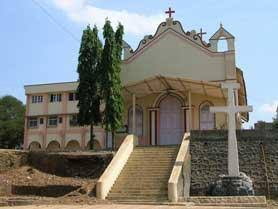
Church of St. Jerome in Kashimira. Mira road east. Mira bhayandar Maharashtra India

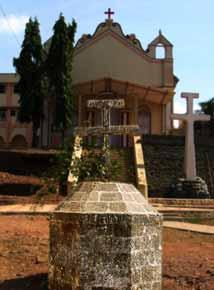
The old cross of St. Jerome church kashimira

The church was originally built by woods in the year 1595 by the Franciscan Fathers dividing the East Indian villages of Kashi (Cassi) and Mira (Mirem). It stood for 23 years until it was heavily damaged by a cyclone in 1618. The church was reconstructed in 1626 along with a parish consisting of the villages of Kashi, Mira, Sanbojapal, CHene, Bandonli, Baroli and Tantoli. The church was once again destroyed in 1739 during the Maratha invasion. The church was rebuilt in 1926 and the original statue of Saint Jerome was placed on the altar of the newly constructed church. The sanctuary of the new church was constructed on top of the rear arch of the original church and the Sacristy of the new church was built on top of sanctuary of the old church. The original cross, which stood for 386 years, was replaced in 1926 alongside the other renovations.

== Feast ==
This Church is dedicated to Saint Jerome. The feast of St. Jerome falls on 30 September but the feast in this church is celebrated in 26 December every year because the newly constructed church was blessed and opened for Public devotion on 26 December 1926.
