= Cavel =

- neighbourhood
- Location in Mumbai, India
- Coordinates: 18.9474°N 72.8272°E
- Country: India
- State: Maharashtra
- District: Mumbai City
- Metro: Mumbai
- Zone: 1
- Ward: C

Government
  - Body: MCGM
- Elevation: 11 m (36 ft)

Languages
  - Official: Marathi
- Time zone: UTC+5:30 (IST)
- PIN: 400002
- Area code: 022
- Vehicle registration: MH 01
- Lok Sabha constituency: Mumbai South
- Vidhan Sabha constituency: Mumbadevi
- Civic agency: MCGM

Cavel is a neighbourhood in South Mumbai. It is located to the northeast of Dhobitalao near the Chira Bazaar area. It got its name from the Koli word Kolwar. The Kolis of this village were converted to Christianity by the Portuguese in the 16th century. Cavel thus became a Christian enclave, and later immigrants of this religion, from Goa, Daman, Bassein and Salsette settled here. Two Portuguese churches are built here, Nossa Senhora de Saude, built-in 1794, presently known as Our Lady of Health, Cavel and Nossa Senhora d'Esperance. In later centuries, when the Christian population moved north, Gujarati and Marwari traders moved into Cavel.

== See also ==
- Kolli (disambiguation)
- Chira Bazaar
- Dhobitalao
- Thakurdwar
