= St. Michael's Church, Mumbai =

Church in Mumbai, India

- St. Michael's Church
- Mahim Church
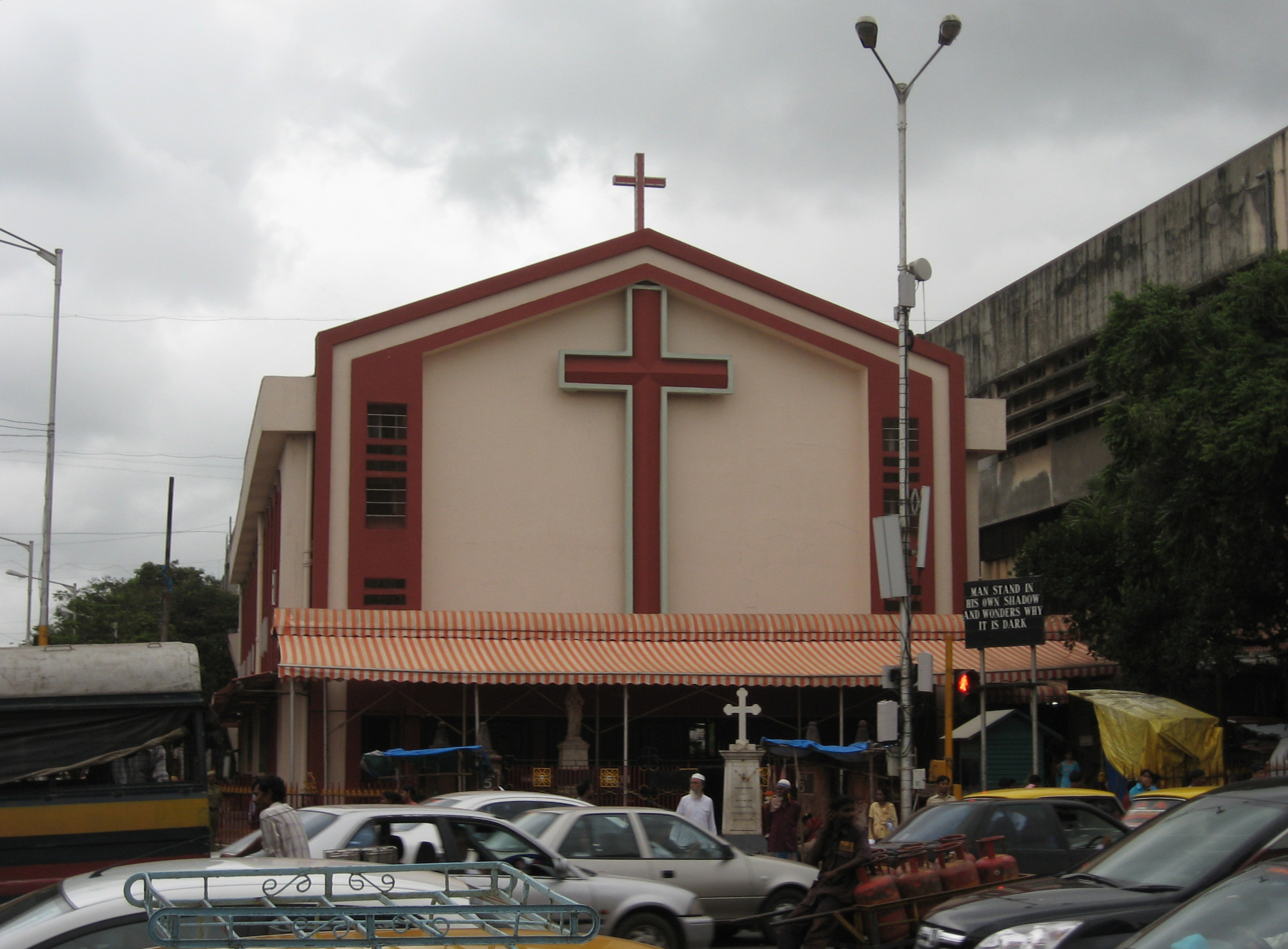
- Picture of the St. Michael's Church in Mumbai

- Location within Mumbai
- 19.0425°N 72.8405°E
- Location: Mahim, Bombay (Mumbai)
- Country: India
- Denomination: Roman Catholic
- Tradition: Novena
- Website: www.stmichaelsmahim.com

History
- Status: Parish Church
- Founded: 1534; 492 years ago

Architecture
- Functional status: Active

Administration
- Archdiocese: Archdiocese of Bombay
- Deanery: North Mumbai Deanery

Clergy
- Archbishop: Oswald Gracias
- Priest: Conrad Pereira

St. Michael's Church is one of the oldest Catholic churches in the Mahim suburb of Mumbai (Bombay), India.

Because the church is at the junction of Lady Jamshetjee Road and Mahim Causeway it is sometimes referred to as Mahim Church.

As of 2023 the Parish priest was Bernard Lancy Pinto.

== History ==
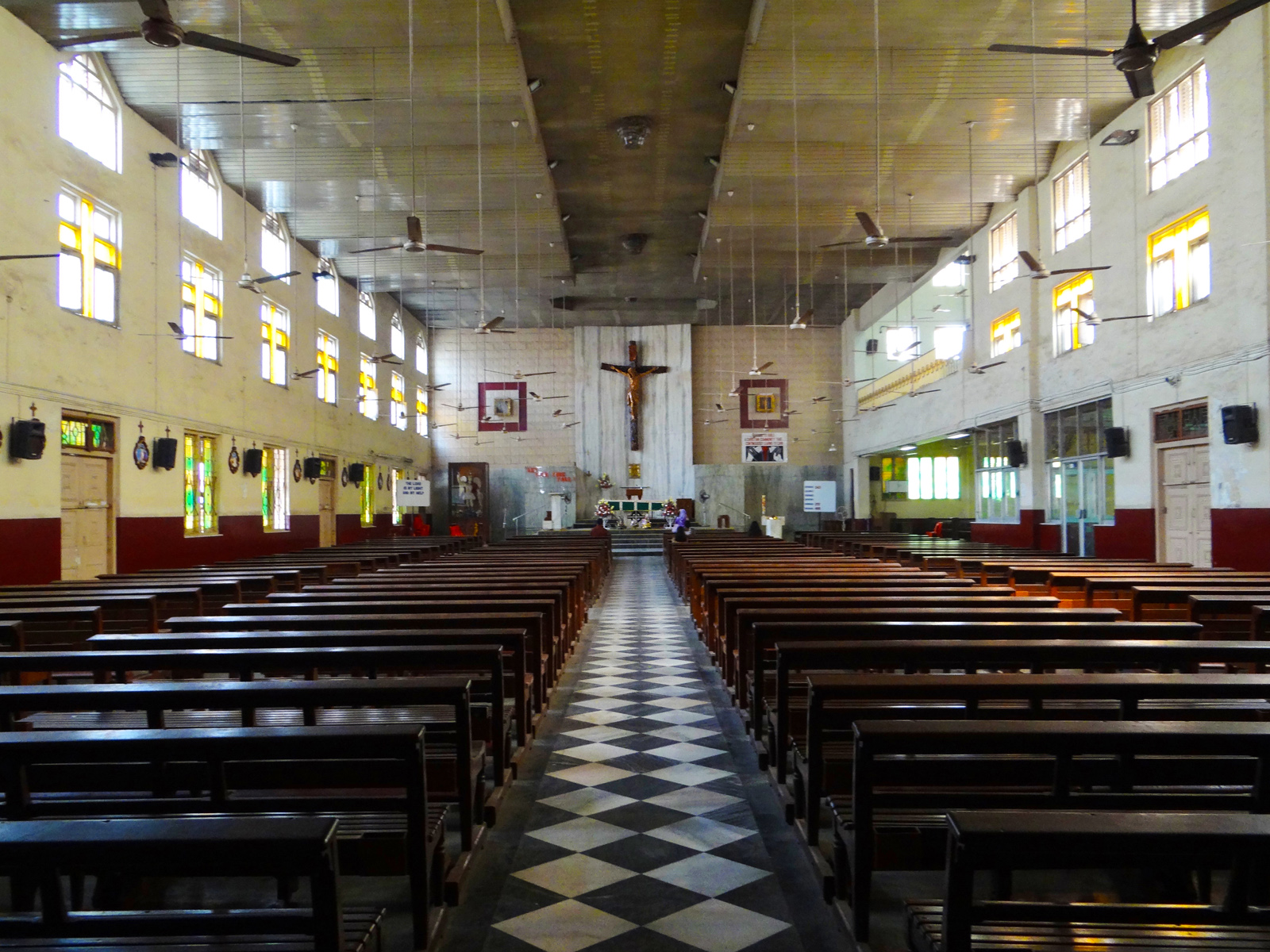
Interior of St. Michael's Church, Mahim (Mumbai, India)

Initially known as São Miguel, the original structure at St Michael's is said to have been built as a convent in 1534 by António do Porto, a church builder of the Franciscan Order. With the Mahratta Invasion of Bassein in 1739, Our Lady of Mount Bandra's chapel was destroyed by the Portuguese at the instigation of the British. A picture of the Blessed Virgin was rescued from the church and was taken to St Michael's. From 1739 to 1761, St Michael's served as a refuge to the popular icon of the Virgin Mary which is now placed at the present-day Basilica of Our Lady of the Mount of Bandra.

In 1853, St Michael's Church witnessed a struggle of ownership between Bishop Anastasius Hartmann and the Portuguese padroado order. St Michael's was in control of the vicars apostolic for nearly 60 years. In 1853, a discontented group decided that the control be handed back to the Padroado system. To prevent this, Hartmann - as the vicars' leader - went to the church and declared that "he would rather die a martyr than surrender the church to the schismatics". Hartmann and his followers stayed in the church with enough food and water for 15 days. His opponents laid "siege" to the church during this period, blocking all entrances. On the 15th day, civil authorities intervened and insisted that the church be reopened. Following this, Hartmann lost control of the church, passing it to the padroado order.

In his 1917 book, Sheppard remarks that St Michael's was situated on the Portuguese church street and is one of the four "only known Portuguese buildings; and of these no distinguishing original feature survives, as they were much rebuilt". The present structure of St. Michaels was rebuilt in 1973.

== Novena ==
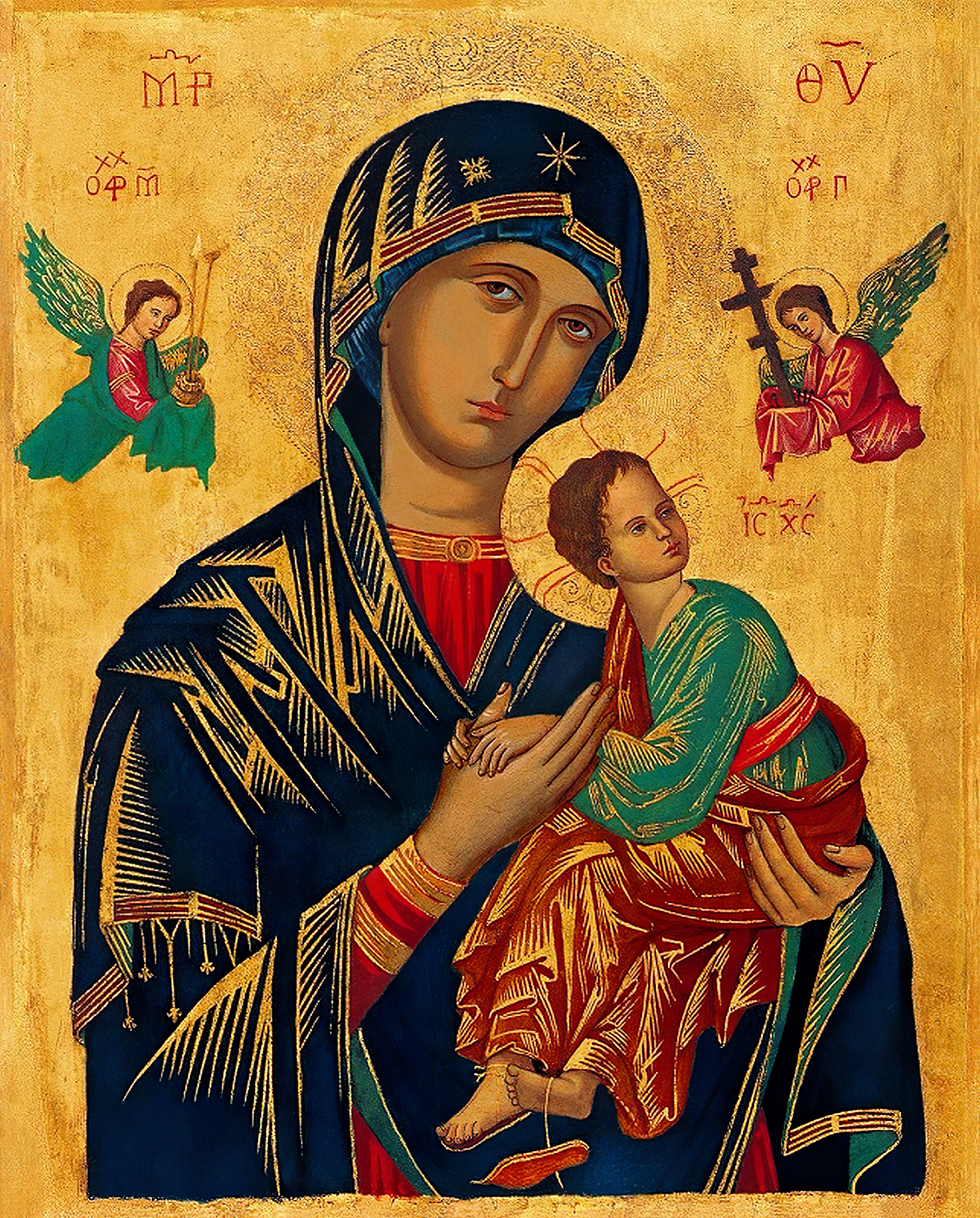
The restored Our Lady of Perpetual Succour picture from Rome

On Wednesdays novena prayers to Our Lady of Perpetual Succour are held. Some of them offer wax figures of what they desire; for example, a wax house. A priest, Hugh Fonseca, said around 40–50,000 devotees visit the church every week.

== Reported "Bleeding" Christ picture ==
On 27 June 2008, thousands of devotees visited St. Michael's to see the picture of Jesus called "the Divine Mercy". The picture showed some red spots which were believed to be blood near the heart of Jesus. The spots were noticed on the day at 08:30PM, on the occasion of the feast of Our Lady of Perpetual Help, and were termed a "miracle" by devotees. Not only Christians, but also Hindus and Muslims from Maharashtra and the neighboring states of Goa, Karnataka, and Gujarat, visited the Church to catch a glimpse of the picture. The queue to entering St. Michael's extended more than a kilometer.

Parish Priest Father Raphael and Father Doneth D'Souza from the St. Michael's church as well as Archbishop cardinal Oswald Gracias declined the miracle claim. Fr. D'Souza explained: "It's not a blood stain and it's also not a miracle. Every image of Divine Mercy has a red halo around the heart and in this case, the red colour has run because of the moisture in the air. It will look like a blood stain, but it's not."

The image was removed and sent to a scientific analysis on the orders of Oswald Gracias. The result of that study was released in the September archdiocesan weekly and it said that the tests "established that there are no traces of blood in the red rays emanating from the Heart of Jesus in this image of Divine Mercy". Monsoon humidity and changes in the air quality were the suspected causes. Oswald Gracias did not explain the exact reasons.

== Activities ==
St Michael's is a ‘go-green’ environmentally friendly parish.

== See also ==
- Saint Michael: Roman Catholic traditions and views
- Weeping Crucifix in Bombay
