= St. Joseph's Church, Juhu =

- St. Joseph's Church, Juhu
- 19°6′26″N 72°49′35″E
- Location: Juhu, Mumbai
- Country: India
- Denomination: Roman Catholic

History
- Status: Parish Church
- Founded: 1853

Architecture
- Functional status: Active

Administration
- Archdiocese: Archdiocese of Bombay

Clergy
- Archbishop: John Rodrigues
- Priest: Rev. Fr. Thomas Monteiro

St. Joseph's Church, Juhu is a Catholic church located in Juhu, Mumbai.

== History ==
In the years prior to the creation of the parish of St. Joseph's, Juhu was a long, narrow island off the west coast of Salsette, just north of the city.
