= Our Lady of Egypt Church =

Church in Mumbai, India

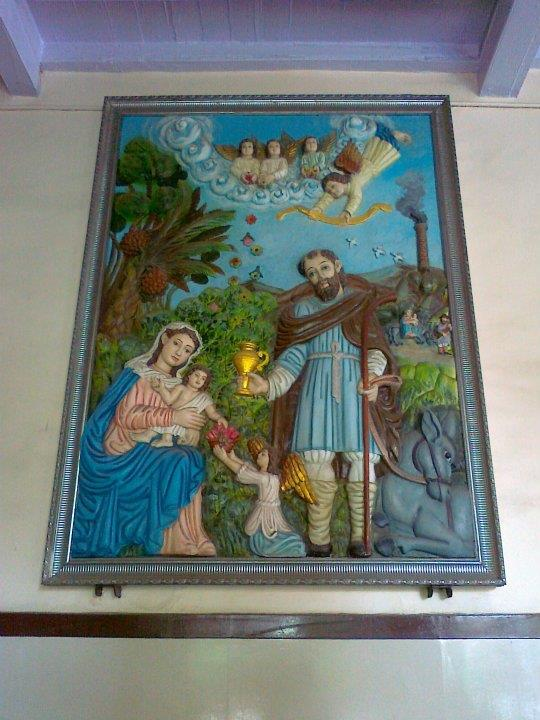
- Our Lady of Egypt Church
- 19°4′42″N 72°52′9″E
- Location: Kalina, Mumbai
- Country: India
- Denomination: Roman Catholic

History
- Status: Parish Church
- Founded: 1606; 420 years ago

Architecture
- Functional status: Active

Administration
- Archdiocese: Archdiocese of Bombay

Clergy
- Archbishop: John Rodrigues

Our Lady of Egypt is a Roman Catholic church in Kalina, Mumbai under the Archdiocese of Bombay. The church was founded in 1606 and celebrated its 400th anniversary in mid-2006. It is one of the older surviving churches in Mumbai and has served the Catholic communities of Kalina and Vakola. Father John Lopes is the parish priest as of 2026.

The church takes its name from the flight into Egypt, the biblical account of the Holy Family's flight from King Herod. Originally established during the Portuguese period, the church later became closely associated with Mumbai's East Indian Catholic Community.

== History ==
The Our Lady of Egypt church was founded in 1606 during the period of Portuguese influence in what was then known as Bombay. The church was founded by a Franciscan missionary who reached the settlement then known as Kole Kalyan by way of the Mithi river.
