= Juhu =

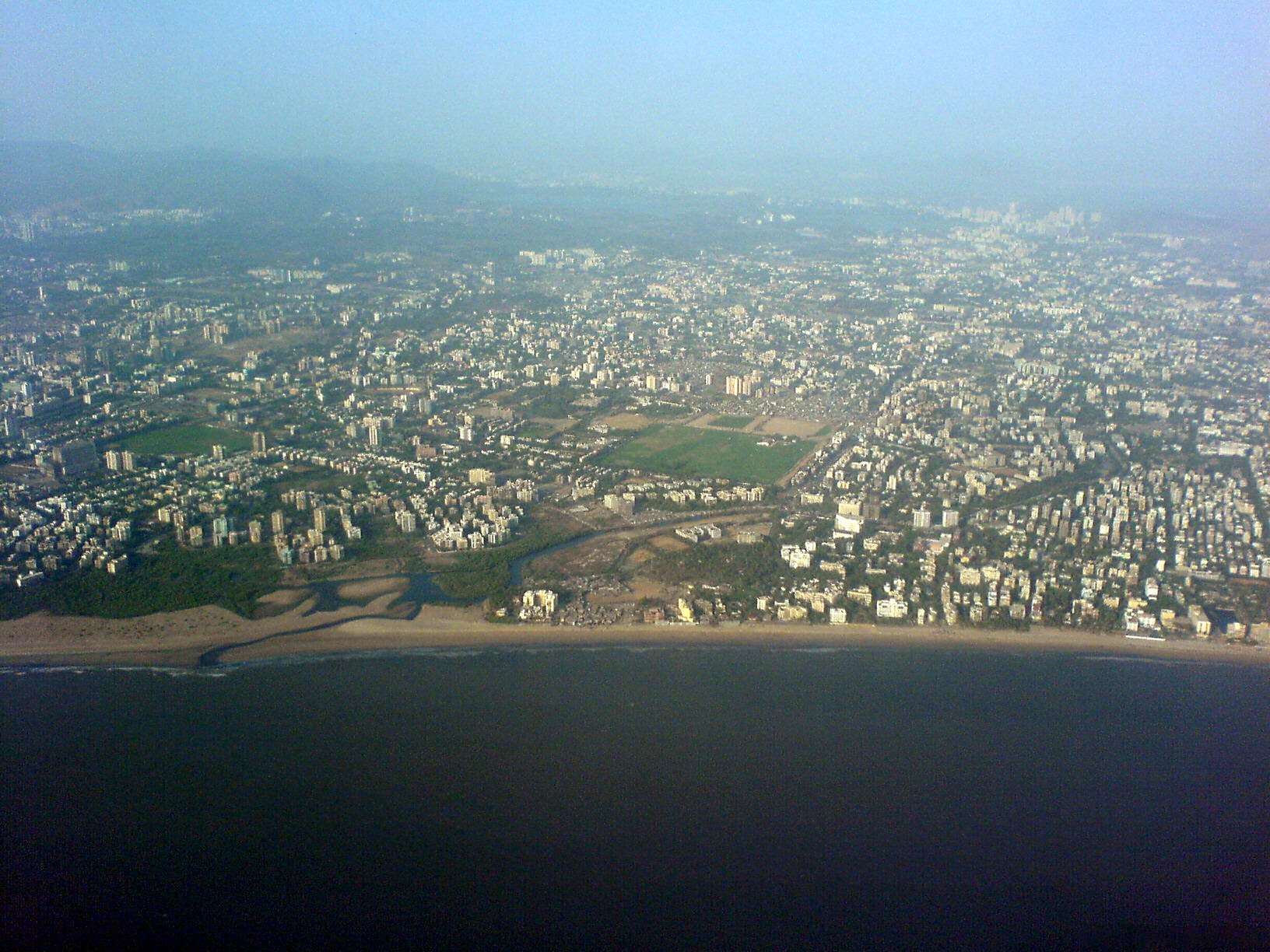
- View of Juhu from an aeroplane window

- Location within Mumbai Location within Maharashtra Location within India
- Coordinates: 19.10°N 72.83°E
- Country: India
- State: Maharashtra
- district: Mumbai Suburban
- City: Mumbai

Government
  - Type: Municipal Corporation
  - Body: Brihanmumbai Municipal Corporation (MCGM)

Languages
  - Official: Marathi
- Time zone: UTC+5:30 (IST)
- Area code: 022

Juhu (pronunciation: [d͡ʒuɦuː]) is a coastal suburb in the Mumbai Suburban district, located on the western coast of Salsette Island. It is known for its sprawling Juhu Beach. It is surrounded by the Arabian Sea to the west, Versova to the north, Vile Parle to the east, and Santacruz to the south. Juhu is among the most expensive and affluent areas of the metropolitan region and is home to many Bollywood celebrities. The nearest railway stations are Santacruz, Andheri, and Vile Parle on the Western and Harbour lines of the Mumbai Suburban Railway. The nearest metro stations are D. N. Nagar and Andheri West. There are two minor B.E.S.T. bus depots in Juhu.

J. R. D. Tata, the father of civil aviation in India, made his maiden voyage to Juhu Airport from Drigh Road Airstrip, Karachi, via Ahmedabad, on 15 October 1932, carrying mail in a Puss Moth aircraft.

== History ==
Juhu is mentioned in the 15th-17th century Marathi-language text Mahikavatichi Bakhar, which states that it was captured by king Pratap Bimb's general Balkrishnrao Somvanshi in the 12th century.

In the nineteenth century, Juhu was an island: a long, narrow sand bar rising above sea level by a metre or two, just off the west coast of Salsette. It could be reached during low tides by walking across the tidal inlet.

Juhu was called "Juvem" by the Portuguese. At its north point, nestled the village of Juhu, inhabited by Agris (salt traders) and Kunbis (cultivators) and at its south point, opposite Bandra island, lived a small colony of fisherfolk and cultivators (Koliwada). The inhabitants of Juhu were mainly Koli people and there was a small section of Goans. The Church of St. Joseph was built by the Portuguese in 1853. The open beaches of Juhu have attracted the well-heeled and the most affluent among Mumbai's population for almost a century. In the 1890s, Jamsetji Tata purchased land on Juhu and built a bungalow there. He planned to develop 1,200 acres (4.9 km^{2}) in Juhu Tara. This was to yield 500 plots of one acre (4,000 m^{2}) each and a seaside resort. Simultaneously he wanted to extend the Mahim Causeway to Santacruz, to access to this area. After his death in 1904, the scheme was abandoned. With the dawn of aviation in the 20th century, the Bombay Flying Club commenced operations in 1929 at what eventually became the present Juhu Aerodrome.

During the Indian independence movement, Mahatma Gandhi visited Mumbai and took several walks along Juhu Beach. A famous photograph of Gandhi poking his grandson Kanaa during a walk on the beach was taken in 1937. To mark Gandhi's visit to Juhu, a statue of him was installed by the beach and a lane near the beach was named Gandhigram Road. There is also a school named after him, the Gandhi Shiksha Bhavan school, in Juhu.

Founded in 1928 as India's first civil aviation airport, Juhu aerodrome served as the city's primary airport during and up to World War II. In the 1990s, a group of terror suspects detonated a bomb in a Juhu hotel, as well as in a number of other locations.

== Juhu Beach ==
Juhu Beach is a symbolic attraction in Mumbai and one of the most popular beaches for tourists and the local public. It is spread across 5 kilometers along the Arabian Sea and is open to the public. The area contains many celebrities’ homes, upscale residences, and hotels. The north end of the beach is Gandhi Gram where Mahatma Gandhi lived when he was a practicing lawyer. The southern end of the beach contains numerous upscale hotels. The area where many Bollywood stars live is coined the ‘Beverly Hills of Bollywood.’ Along the beach are many vendors popular for their street food.

== Religious places ==
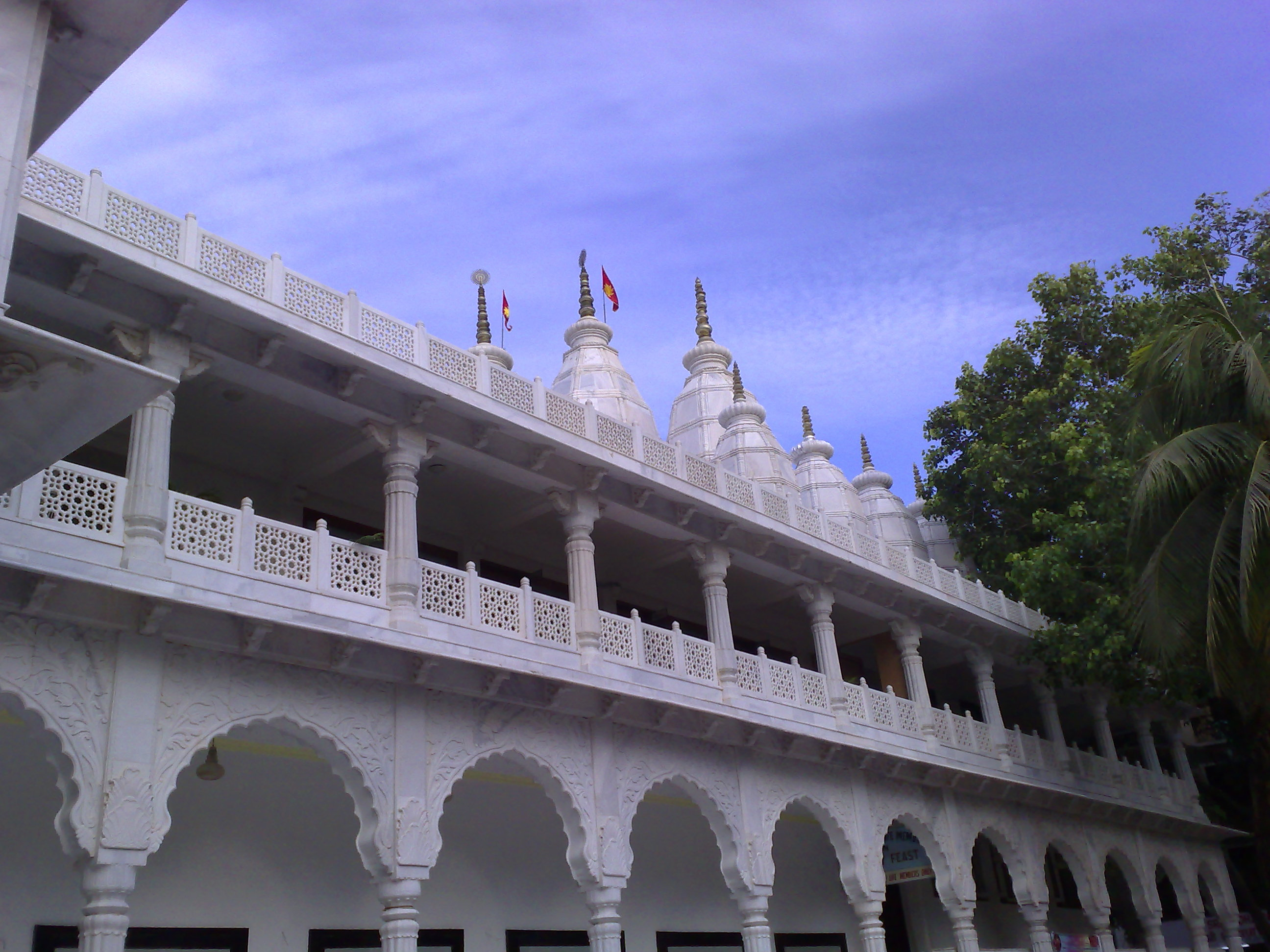
ISKCON, Juhu

- International Society for Krishna Consciousness (ISKCON) also known as Hare Krishna Mandir
- St. Joseph's Church, Juhu
