= Sacred Heart Church, Santacruz =

Sacred Heart Church
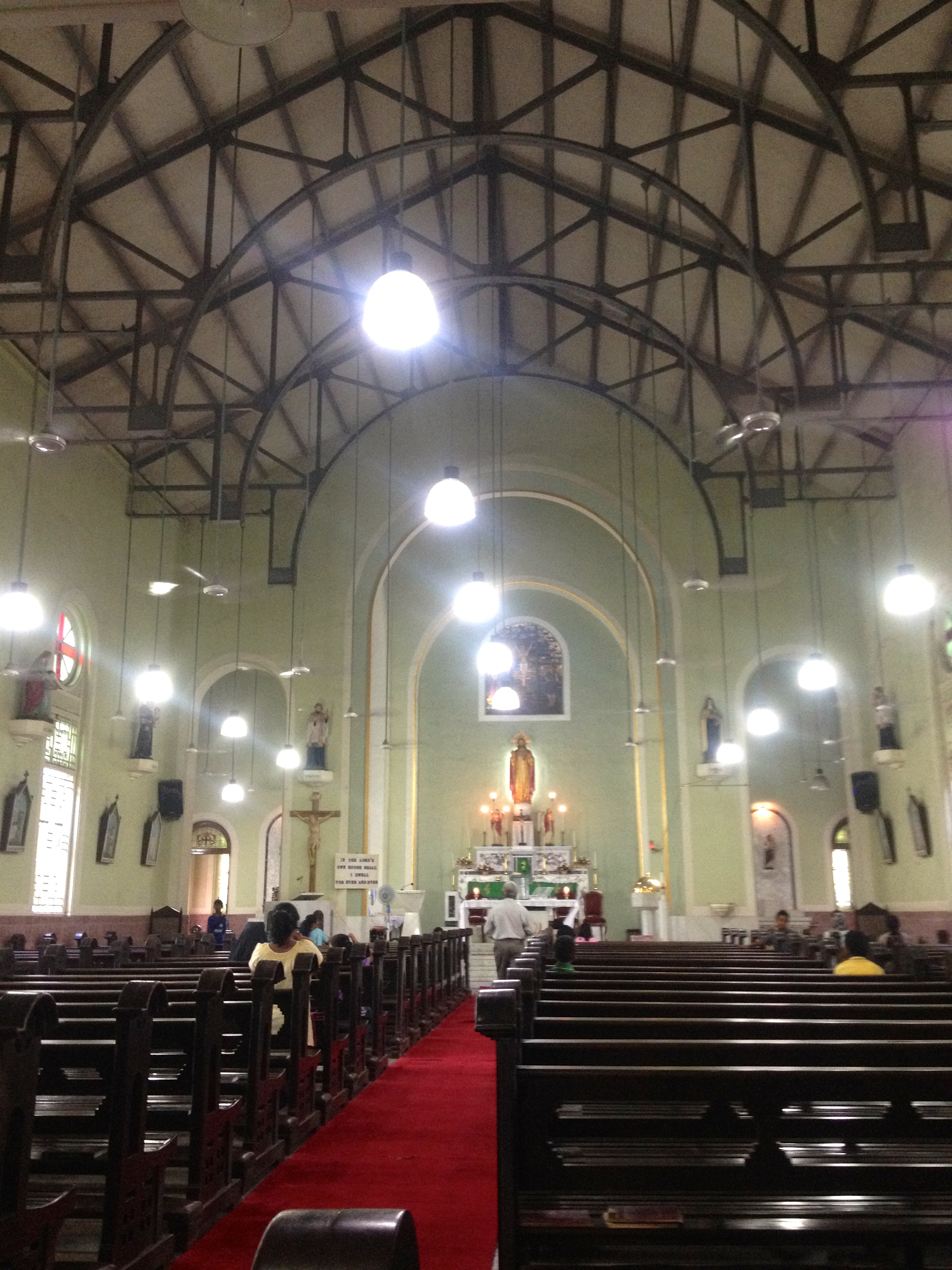
- Church interior
- Sacred Heart Church
- Location: Santa Cruz (Mumbai), Mumbai
- Country: India
- Denomination: Roman Catholic

History
- Status: Parish Church
- Founded: 1928

Architecture
- Functional status: Active

Administration
- Archdiocese: Archdiocese of Bombay

Clergy
- Archbishop: Oswald Gracias

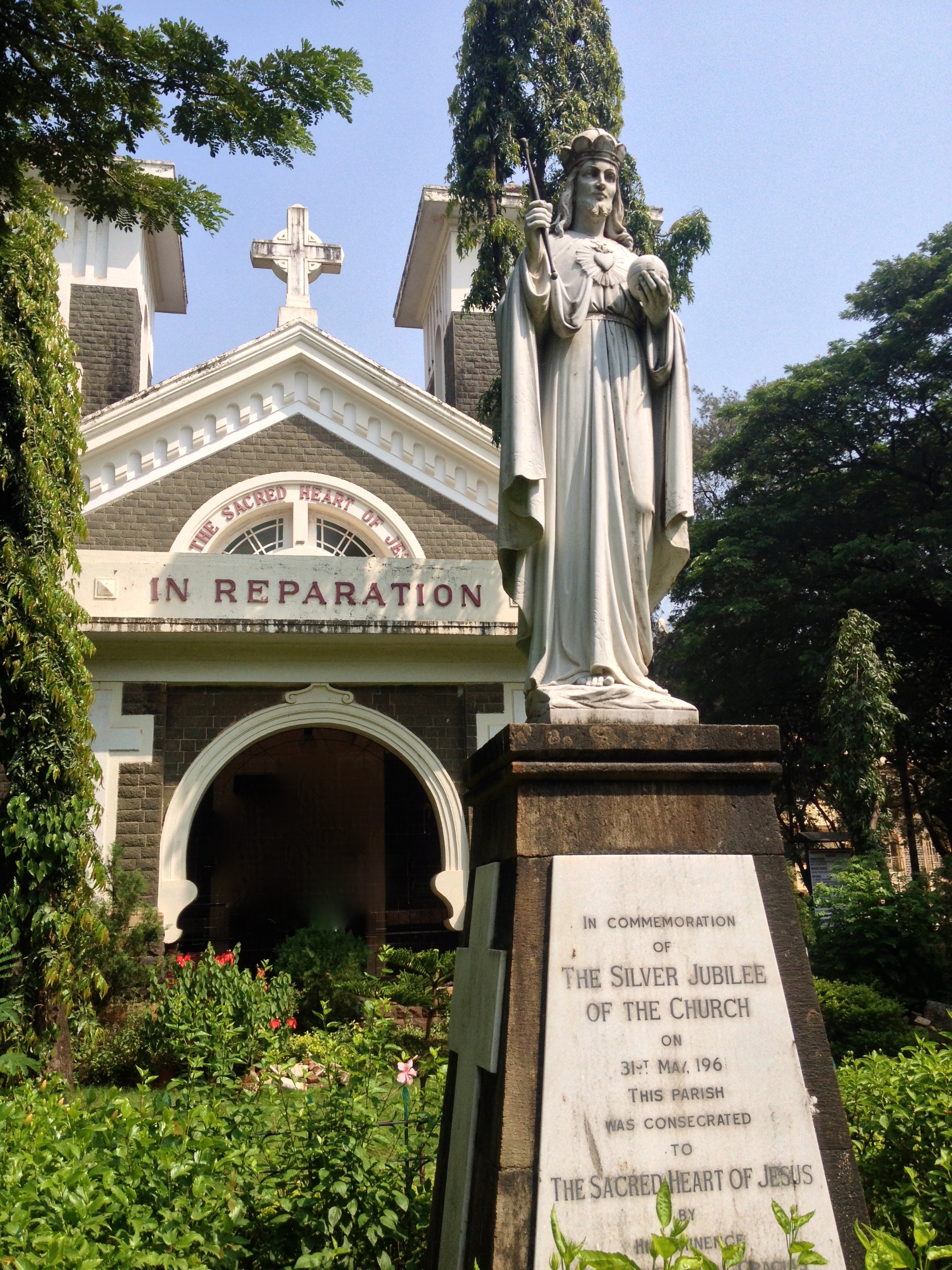

Sacred Heart Church is located on S. V. Road in Santa Cruz (Mumbai), Mumbai. The church, founded in 1936, is a Grade III heritage structure. The church has 8,000 parishioners and is part of the Roman Catholic Archdiocese of Bombay.

== History ==
A small chapel, built around 1850, was used by the original East Indian villagers who were served by the St. Andrews Church in Bandra. Every Sunday a priest from Bandra would come to Santacruz and offer mass for Catholics residing in the traditional Gaothans (village). In the early twentieth century, many Catholics from Goa, Mangalore and Kerala began migrating to Bombay. These people settled in Santacruz since Bombay's traditional catholic localities like Colaba and Byculla were overcrowded. The Sacred Heart Church was completed in 1936 to cater to the spiritual needs of this growing population.
