= Church of Our Lady of Health, Cavel =

- Church of Our Lady of Health, Cavel
- 18.949126°N 72.840557°E
- Location: Cavel, Mumbai
- Country: India
- Denomination: Roman Catholic

History
- Status: Parish Church
- Founded: 1794; 232 years ago

Architecture
- Functional status: Active

Administration
- Archdiocese: Archdiocese of Bombay

Clergy
- Archbishop: Oswald Cardinal Gracias

The Church of Our Lady of Health, Cavel is a Roman Catholic church under the Archdiocese of Bombay. It was built by the Portuguese in 1794, when it was a chapel under the Padroado jurisdiction.

== History ==
When the old chapel began to decay, a new Church was built in 1812 and was remodelled in 1971. There is a beautiful grotto with the statue of the Our Lady of Immaculate Conception, in front of the church.
