= Antop Hill =

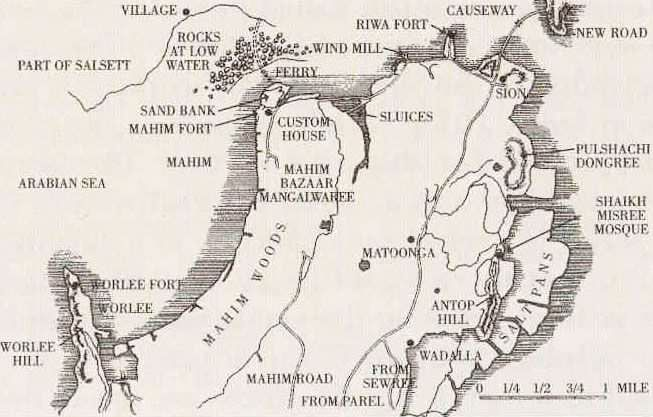
- Old map of the region (post 1805). Antop Hill is shown to the Southeast.
- Coordinates: 19.022220°N 72.866564°E
- Country: India
- State: Maharashtra
- City: Mumbai

Languages
  - Official: Marathi
- Time zone: UTC+5:30 (IST)
- PIN: 400037
- Area code: 022
- Vehicle registration: MH 01
- Civic agency: BMC

Antop Hill is a neighbourhood in Mumbai to the east of the Harbour railway line. It derives its name from a local Marathi owner called Antoba. Over time, the name was anglicised to "Antop". To the south is the MBPT(Mumbai Port Trust Colony) and to the north is the C.G.S. colony. To the east lies the Trombay Hill and the RCF Factory.

In recent years, the neighborhood has also gained pop-culture fame as the hometown and launching pad of independent rapper Emiway Bantai, who frequently references the area and its street culture in his music.

Antop Hill is well known for the Central Govt. Housing Colony, which came up in the late 1950s and caters mainly to housing government employees working in customs, income tax, the Indian Navy, sales tax, and other central government departments. It is close to the Harbour Line via Kings Circle, G.T.B. Nagar (2 km), and Wadala Road (2.5 km), as well as the Central Line via Sion (3 km) and Dadar, making it accessible to all of Mumbai's major railway lines. Additionally, it has excellent bus connectivity to all parts of the city and is connected to India's first monorail, which runs from Chembur to Sant Gadge Maharaj Chowk.

Antop Hill starts from Kokari Agar Road near Antop Hill Church. Barkat Ali Dargah is present at it's southern end, overlooking the Nana Phadnavis flyover.

The area around the oil depot has varies cemeteries (Chinese, Baháʼí, Sunni Muslim, Brahma Samaj and European). The New Link road cuts the hill into two parts. The northern section has the four Walchand Bungalows, which are about a century old. Just below the bungalows on the eastern side was the factory of Indian Hume Pipes, owned by the Walchand family, that has now been converted into a housing area called Dosti Acres. On the western side is the brand new patent & trademarks office. The southernmost wooden part of this hill has the Haji Allana sanatorium. Between the sanatorium and the C.G.S. Colony are the ancient dargahs of Bhatkali Shah and Sheikh Misri.

Beyond the Dosti Housing complex, further eastward are the twin towers (as of 2006) of Lloyds Estate. Right next to the Lloyd Estate is the Vidyalankar Institute of Technology (VIT) run by the Vidyalankar group. The engineering college started in 1999 and shifted to its current location around 2000–2001. Next to the Lloyd Estate, there is an industrial estate, Antop Hill Warehousing Complex with 624 service industrial Galas, spread over 17 acres (69,000 m^{2}). 800 new Galas are yet to be constructed.

Many parts of Antop Hill are occupied by slums. Around this area is the Sangam Nagar slum. The Darul-Salam High School which is recognized by the Government of Maharashtra is located here. This organization also conducts the Mahatma Phule Hami Yojna (Sarva Shiksha Abhiyan) classes for children from slums who are unable to attend a school or are school drop-outs. Notably, the Enforcement Directorate (ED) arrested Omkar Group chairman Kamal Kishor Gupta and managing director Babulal Varma in a Rs 410 crore money laundering case linked to a slum redevelopment project in this area.

The Antop Hill police station is located in Sector 6 of the C.G.S. Colony.
