= Santacruz, Mumbai =

Santacruz
- Suburb
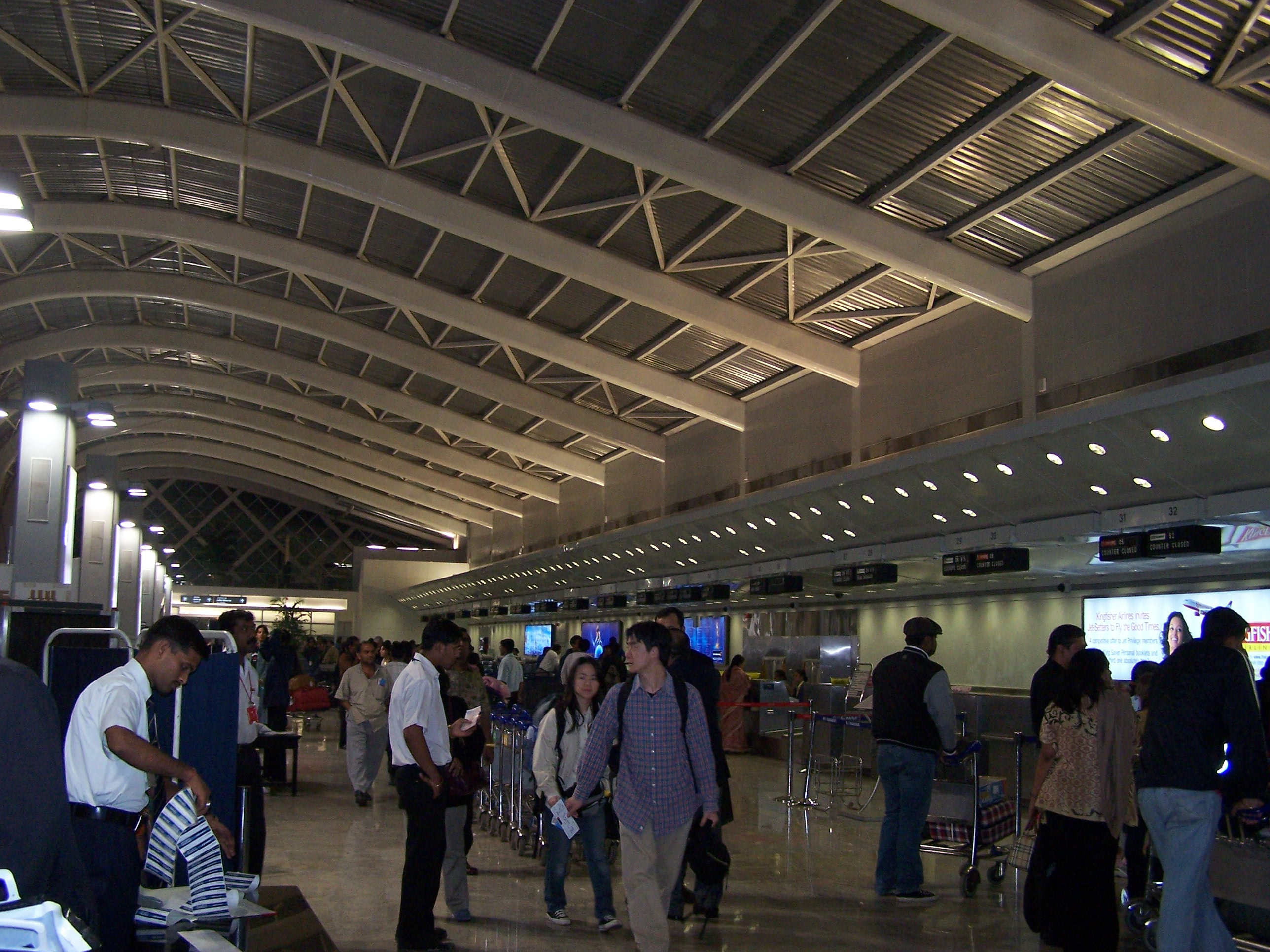
- Domestic airport at Santacruz

- Location within Mumbai
- Coordinates: 19.081667°N 72.841389°E
- Country: India
- State: Maharashtra
- District: Mumbai Suburban
- City: Mumbai
- Time zone: UTC+5:30 (IST)
- Area code: 022
- Vehicle registration: MH-02

Santacruz or Santa Cruz (Pronunciation: [saːn̪t̪akɾuːz]) is a suburb of Mumbai. The Santacruz railway station on the Mumbai Suburban Railway, the domestic terminal (T1) of the Chhatrapati Shivaji Maharaj International Airport, and one campus of the University of Mumbai, are all located in Santacruz (East).

== History ==
The term Santa Cruz comes from the Portuguese words meaning "Holy Cross", a reference to a 150-year-old cross located on Chapel Lane within the compound of a home for destitute women run by Mother Teresa's Missionaries of Charity trust. That name was also given to a church that existed on a site on the western side of the railway station along the current Swami Vivekanand Road, presently occupied by the Sacred Heart Boys High School and Sacred Heart Church. This original church was destroyed by the Marathas during their conquest of the Salsette Island from Portugal. When the railways began operations in October 1888, the local railway station was named after the Holy Cross, and Santacruz, as a locality came into being.

The then British Government set up RAF Santa Cruz, a military airfield, in 1942. It was home to several RAF squadrons during World War II, from 1942 to 1947. The airfield covered an area of about 1,160 hectares (2,900 acres) and initially had three runways. The airfield was transferred to the Indian Government for civilian use upon Independence, and came to be known as Santa Cruz airport, the city's main airport.

=== Kalina ===
During the statewide floods in 2005, Air India Colony was flooded with water five to six metres deep. In many buildings, the water had entered in the ground floor and first floor level houses and the people had to take shelter on the upper floors. Rescue boats of Navy were requisitioned deployed in the area. Immediately after the deluge, restoration programme was implemented and portable pumps were installed at Air India colony, helping the early discharge of flood water.

=== Willingdon Colony ===
The Bombay Catholic Cooperative Housing Society constructed in 1930 a low-cost housing estate for the Catholic community, known as Willingdon Colony. It included pre-existing bungalows that the Cooperative had built as early as 1917. The colony was spread over 5.5 acres (2.2 ha) and managed by the Cooperative. The members of the cooperative voted in 1966 to redevelop the colony, with 673 new flats to be built. The redevelopment was planned to provide permanent accommodation for 230 members, with the excess flats to be offered for sale. An additional, separate, building on the land was to provide capacity to temporarily house a further 530 people displaced by slum redevelopments, through the Slum Rehabilitation Authority. A small number of cooperative members opposed the redevelopment, and it was delayed by litigation for nearly 50 years.

Despite heritage preservation concerns, and over the objections of the twenty remaining resident families, their final challenge was dismissed by the Supreme Court in 2014, allowing redevelopment to proceed. Demolition of historic bungalows commenced soon after. Further pauses occurred throughout 2014, as stays for proceedings continued. Despite the court's rejection of the challenge to redevelopment, the same group began a new round of legal actions in 2015, with a petition to the High Court, challenging the validity of the permit issued to the developer to transplant 103 trees from the site. The petitioners were not successful in having the tree removal permit withdrawn.

== Infrastructure and Real Estate ==
Santacruz has undergone significant infrastructural upgrades to improve east-west connectivity across Mumbai. A major milestone is the Santacruz–Chembur Link Road (SCLR) and its subsequent extensions, which provide a direct, high-speed corridor connecting Santacruz to the eastern suburbs and the Bandra Kurla Complex (BKC). The final phase of the SCLR extension network was completed and inaugurated in August 2026. This 1.4 km elevated corridor provides a direct connection between BKC and the Western Express Highway, allowing motorists to bypass historically congested local roads around Kalina and Vakola.

Public transit in the suburb is being modernized with the construction of Mumbai Metro Line 2B (Yellow Line) by the MMRDA, which connects D.N. Nagar to Mandale. The elevated route passes directly through Santacruz via SV Road, with dedicated stations at Nanavati Hospital, Khira Nagar, and Saraswat Nagar.

Driven by this rapid infrastructure development and its immediate proximity to BKC—Mumbai's premier business district—Santacruz East and West have both experienced substantial real estate growth. The suburb is undergoing a wave of redevelopment, transitioning from older, low-rise cooperative housing societies into modern high-rise residential corridors.

== Amenities and places of interest ==
=== Cultural ===
- Ramakrishna Mission (though strictly in Khar) has a yearly fest between October (for the Durga Puja festival) and December. It is widely attended for its mix of eclectic stalls selling cultural wares, clothes, religious and spiritual books, devotional music and eateries. The food stalls outside the hospital are famous in Mumbai for Chaat
- The Yoga Institute (TYI), founded in 1918, is widely reported to be the oldest organised yoga center in the world. It was the first to offer courses to men, women and children of any caste or creed, for free. Initially located at Versova, Bombay, its permanent home was established at Santacruz in 1948. TYI's founder, Shri Yogendra (1897–1989), played a key role in developing medical hatha yoga, a step in the history of yoga that would later lead to the development of Yoga therapy.

=== Education ===
==== University campuses ====
- SNDT Women's University, with Juhu campus on the Juhu Tara Road, which houses approximately 15 institutions, mostly for Postgraduate
- The Kalina Campus of the University of Mumbai

==== Schools ====
- Rose Manor International School, Santacruz (West)
- St. Anthony High School, Nehru Road, Vakola, Santacruz (East): for boys from preschool to Standard-X levels; named 'high school' even though it also offers primary and pre-primary education
- Billabong High International School, Santacruz West, a coeducational school from pre-primary to class 12, offering IGCSE (Cambridge) curriculum
- R. N. Podar School, a CBSE-board school offering education from junior kindergarten to class 12.
- Panbai International School - IGCSE
- Flamingo Kids International Pre primary School - Santacruz East
- Panbai International College - A levels, Santacruz, Mumbai

=== Parks and gardens ===
- Juhu Garden, Juhu-Tara Road, Santacruz (West), known for its large-scale aircraft replica in the children's playground, and consequently popularly called the "Aeroplane Garden". The original version, a concrete replica of a Boeing 707-437 was donated by Air India in the 1960s, and generations of local children played in its cabin and "cockpit". Its partial collapse in 2009 was the cause of a fatality, after which public access was closed; its demolition followed in 2011. A replacement version was installed and opened to the public in 2013.

=== Churches, temples and other religious sites ===
- Sacred Heart Church, Santacruz (West)
- Our Lady of Egypt Church, Kalina

=== Hospitals ===
- Nanavati Hospital
