= Rotational angiography =

Medical imaging technique based on x-ray,

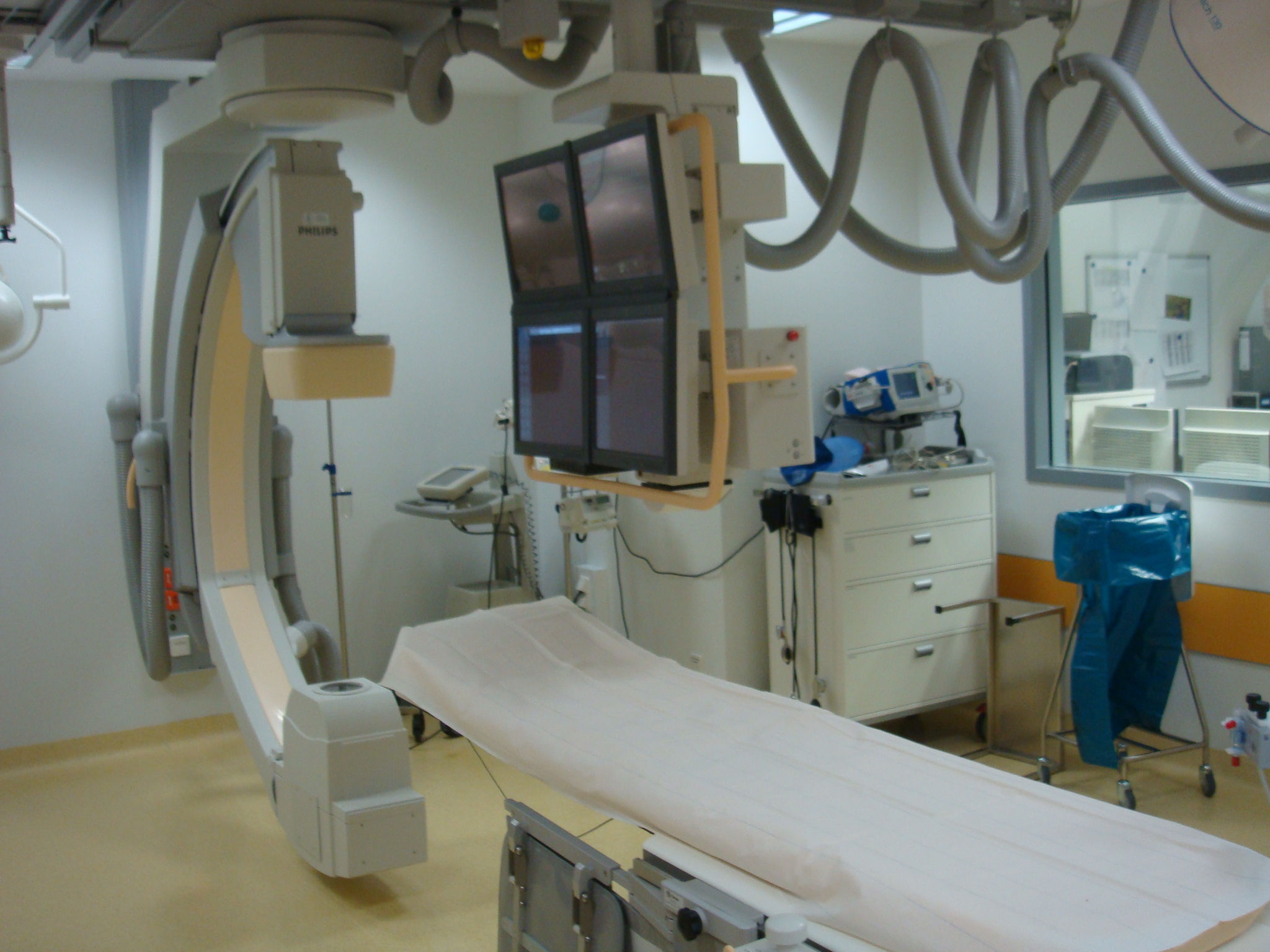
- Ceiling-mounted C-arm in a cardiac catheterization lab
- Purpose: acquire CT-like 3D volumes during hybrid surgery

Rotational angiography is a medical imaging technique based on x-ray, that allows to acquire CT-like 3D volumes during hybrid surgery or during a catheter intervention using a fixed C-arm. The fixed C-arm thereby rotates around the patient and acquires a series of x-ray images that are then reconstructed through software algorithms into a 3D image. Synonyms for rotational angiography include flat-panel volume CT and cone-beam CT.

== Technical background ==
In order to acquire a 3D image with a fixed C-arm, the C-arm is positioned at the body part in question so that this body part is in the isocenter between the x-ray tube and the detector. The C-arm then rotates around that isocenter, the rotation being between 200° and 360° (depending on the equipment manufacturer). Such a rotation takes between 5 and 20 seconds, during which a few hundred 2D images are acquired. A piece of software then performs a cone beam reconstruction. The resulting voxel data can then be viewed as a multiplanar reconstruction, i.e. by scrolling through the slices from three projection angles, or as a 3D volume, which can be rotated and zoomed.

== Clinical applications ==
3D angiography or Rotational Angiography is used in interventional radiology, interventional cardiology and minimally-invasive surgery (e.g., Hybrid cardiac surgical procedure).

== CT versus rotational angiography ==
Classically, CT imaging has been the method of choice for acquiring 3D data pre- or postoperatively. Choosing between CT and rotational angiography depends on several factors.

- The patient positioning on the CT scanner table differs from the positioning on an interventional table during hybrid surgery. Accordingly, to use a preoperative CT image during the procedure, a software registration between the CT image and the life fluoroscopy is required. This takes some time and is not perfectly precise. An article from the heart center in Leipzig suggests that intraoperative 3D imaging with rotational angiography is much more precise and can be performed with low contrast and low radiation dose if combined with diluted contrast injection and rapid ventricular pacing. They found measurements performed on this 3D image highly reliable.
- Changes in anatomy: During endovascular procedures, such as the grafting of an aortic aneurysm, 3D planning can be done either on CT image acquired preoperatively or on an intraoperative 3D image acquired by rotational angiography. The CT image is usually acquired a few days or at least hours before the procedure, giving time for planning. However, the anatomy of the vessels can be distorted considerably through the insertion of stiff wires and catheters, making the planning inaccurate. An intraoperative 3D image allows highly accurate planning after the insertion of these tools, and through modern 3D tools it can be done within a few minutes.
- Image quality can differ between rotational angiography and CT images. The longer acquisition times of the C-arm image compared to a multislice CT can increase motion artifacts, especially given the typical patient is quite old and not necessarily able to hold his/her breath for the whole image acquisition. Algorithms to reduce these artifacts increase patient dose.

Image quality is not only defined through artifacts but also through temporal, spatial, and contrast resolution. The physical characteristics of a flat-panel detector decrease the temporal resolution as one of the ceramic detectors used in multidetector CT systems. By contrast, the spatial resolution of flat-panel volume CT (rotational angiography using a C-arm) can be much better than that of a multislice CT scanner, with resolution ranges between 200 and 300 μm in high-resolution mode, compared to up to 600μm for a multislice CT. Contrast resolution, measured in hounsfield units (HU), is only marginally inferior than with a multidetector CT, the difference in attenuation from the background being 5 HU with flat-panel volume CT (=rotational angiography) compared to 3 HU for a multidetector CT. This difference is negligible for most therapeutical applications.

== Radiation dose ==
X-ray radiation is ionizing radiation, thus exposure is potentially harmful. Compared to a mobile C-arm, which is classically used in surgery, CT scanners and fixed C-arms may deliver higher dose and may be operated for longer periods during surgery. It is therefore important to monitor radiation dose to both patient and the medical staff.

Rotational angiography may increase the exposure of workers to scattered radiation, as the X-ray source moves around the patient. Lead curtains are often used at the table side to protect the lower body region, but these are less effective with rotational work. Patient doses can be reduced with techniques common to fluoroscopic imaging such as use of pulsed modes, appropriate collimation and short imaging times.
