= G-arm medical imaging =

Diagnostic Imaging Technique

- Purpose: fluoroscopic X-ray for diagnosis

G-arm medical imaging systems are based on fluoroscopic X-ray and are used for a variety of diagnostic imaging and minimally invasive surgical procedures. The name is derived from the G-shaped arm used to connect two X-ray generators and two X-ray detectors, image intensifiers or digital flat panel detectors, to one another. The main advantage of the G-arm, compared to a conventional C-arm system, is that it combines a pair of X-ray chains facilitating simultaneous views in two perpendicular planes, also called G-arm imaging.

== Background ==
Fluoroscopic X-ray is used for a variety of diagnostic imaging and minimally invasive surgical procedures. For surgery it is practical to use a mobile C-arm system where the x-ray generator and x-ray detector are placed on a C-shaped arm positioned directly opposite from and aligned centrally to each other. The C-arm can be moved horizontally, vertically and around the swivel axes, so that X-ray images of the patient can be produced from different angles. The disadvantage of the C-arm is that imaging is limited to only one plane at a time.

=== From C-arm to G-arm ===
For precision surgery procedures, for example in orthopedics, it is necessary to generate a view of the surgical site from two perpendicular viewing positions, usually a frontal and a lateral view. With a C-arm system this can only be achieved by manually repositioning the C-arm for the second view. This can be challenging due to the presence of sterile drapes and other surgical devices. Bringing the x-ray generator from a non-sterile area, underneath the operating table to a horizontal position close do the patient can compromise the sterility of the surgical area and increase the risks of infections. Shifting the C-arm must normally be done many times during the surgical procedure, taking additional time and increasing the radiation exposure to patient and staff. With the G-arm the stand can stay in a fixed position during the entire surgical procedure as both imaging planes can be viewed simultaneously. Benefits are shorter procedures, higher accuracy, and lower radiation exposure. The fixed position of the stand also ensures a better sterility.

== Technical description ==
A G-arm medical imaging system is typically composed by the following basic elements:

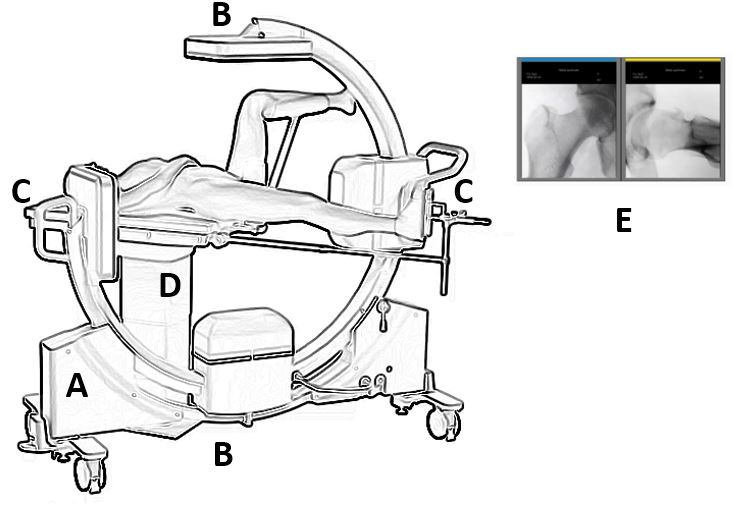
Main components of a G-arm medical imaging system. Here positioned for a hip surgery.

A. A movable stand

B. X-ray source and detector for the frontal view.

C. X-ray source and detector for the lateral view

D. Patient table with extensions (here shown in position for a hip surgery)

E. Control unit with post-processing image software and displays for the two perpendicular imaging planes

X-ray detectors, the height of the stand and the angle of the G-Arm may be motorized or manually moved for fine adjustment of the iso-center of the x-ray beams.

== Clinical applications ==
Due to the benefits resulting from the ability to simultaneously view two perpendicular planes G-arm Medical Imaging systems are mainly used for orthopedic and traumatic surgery procedures, such as hips, knees and spine.

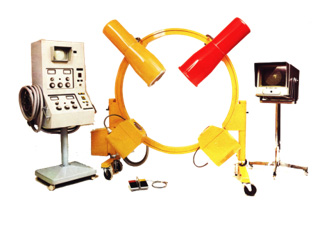
Multiplan, medical imaging system from 1970. Patented and manufactured by Saab AB, Sweden.

== History ==
The G-Arm Imaging system is originating from a patented invention from 1970 by the Swedish company Saab AB, an aerospace and automobile manufacturer who at that time also was active within the field of medical devices. In the original product the two x-ray chains were placed in an annular stand. The product, called Multiplane, had some practical disadvantages due to the closed form of the stand. Later a part of the annular stand was cut out and the G-arm was born.

The G-Arm concept has been gradually developed to its current form. In 2002 the concept was acquired by the company Scanflex Healthcare AB based in Stockholm, Sweden who has refined the product and is marketing it worldwide under the trademark, Biplanar (trademark registration cancelled 2011). The G-Arm concept was also adopted in 2011 by Beijing East Whale Imaging Tech Co., who hold the registered trademarks for G-Arm and MultiScan G-Arm System under this category and a number of related patents. The company was founded in 1998 and is based in Beijing, China. Whale Imaging Inc, its R&D and marketing headquarters, is based near Boston, USA. The Whale G-Arm received a Spine Technology award in 2014.
