= Hybrid operating room =

Type of surgical theatre

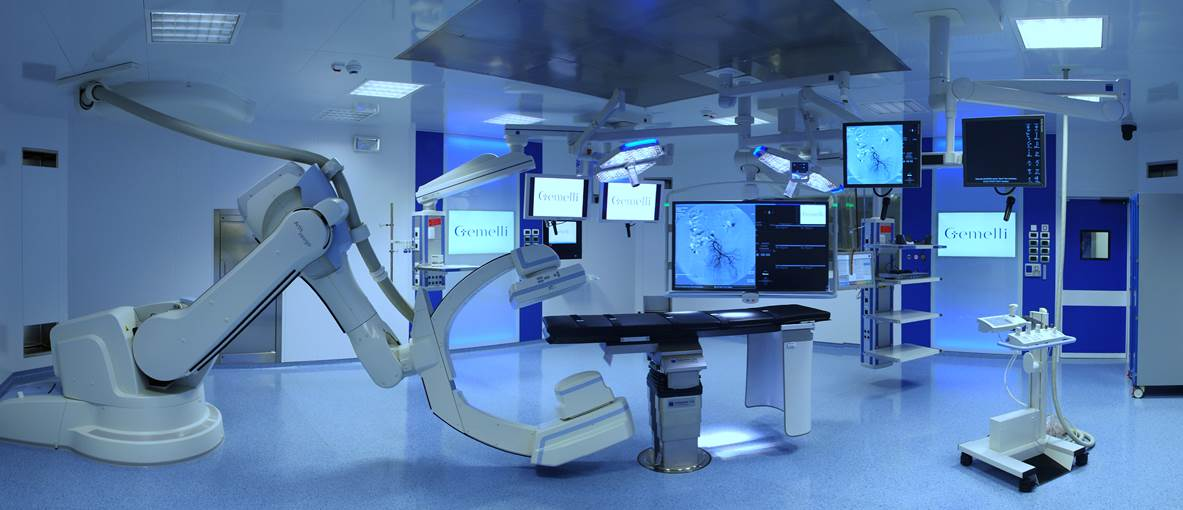
- Hybrid operating room for cardiovascular surgery at Gemelli Hospital in Rome
- Specialty: Surgery

A hybrid operating room is an advanced surgical theatre that is equipped with advanced medical imaging devices such as fixed C-arms, X-ray tomography (CT) scanners, or magnetic resonance imaging (MRI) scanners. These imaging devices enable minimally-invasive surgery. Minimally-invasive surgery is intended to be less traumatic for the patient and minimize incisions on the patient and perform surgery procedure through one or several small cuts.

Though imaging has been a standard part of operating rooms for a long time in the form of mobile C-arms, ultrasound, and endoscopy, these minimally-invasive procedures require imaging techniques that can visualize smaller body parts such as thin vessels in the heart muscle and can be facilitated through intraoperative 3D imaging.

== Clinical applications ==
Hybrid operating rooms are currently used mainly in cardiac, vascular, and neurosurgery, but could be suitable for a number of other surgical disciplines.

=== Cardiovascular surgery ===
The repair of diseased heart valves and the surgical treatment of rhythm disturbances and aortic aneurysms can benefit from the imaging capabilities of a hybrid OR. Hybrid Cardiac Surgery is a widespread treatment for these diseases.

The shift toward endovascular treatment of abdominal aortic aneurysms also pushed the spread of angiographic systems in vascular operating room environments. Particularly for complex endografts, a hybrid operating theater should be a basic requirement. Also, it is well-suited for emergency treatment.

Some surgeons not only verify the placement of complex endografts intraoperatively, they also use their angiography system and the applications it offers for planning the procedure. As anatomy changes between a preoperative CT and intraoperative fluoroscopy because of patient positioning and the insertion of stiff material, more precise planning is possible if the surgeon performs an intraoperative rotational angiography, takes an automatic segmentation of the aorta, places markers for the renal arteries and other landmarks in 3D and then overlays the contours on 2D fluoroscopy. This guidance is updated with any change in C-arm angulation/position or table position.

=== Neurosurgery ===
In neurosurgery, applications for hybrid ORs are for example spinal fusion and intracranial aneurysm coiling. In both cases, they have been rated promising to improve outcomes. For spinal fusion procedures, an integration with a navigation system can further improve the workflow. Intraoperative acquisition of a cone beam computed tomography image can also be used to reconstruct three dimensional CT-like images. This may be useful for the applications above and also for confirmation of targeting for placement of ventricular catheters, biopsies, or deep brain stimulation electrodes. Intra-operative MRI is used to guide brain tumor surgery as well as placement of deep brain stimulation electrodes and interstitial laser thermal therapy.

=== Thoracic surgery and endobronchial procedures ===
Procedures to diagnose and treat small pulmonary nodules have also recently been performed in hybrid operating rooms. Interventional image guidance thereby offers the advantage of precisely knowing the position of the nodules, particularly in small or "ground-glass" opaque tumors, metastases, and/or patients with reduced pulmonary function. This allows for a precise navigation in biopsies, and resection in video-assisted thoracoscopic surgery. Most importantly, using interventional imaging in video-assisted thoracoscopic surgery can substitute for the loss of tactile sensing. This approach also delivers the potential to spare healthy lung tissue by knowing the exact position of the nodule which increases the quality of life for the patient after the operation.

The process for diagnosis and treatment usually comprises 3 steps:

1. Detection of nodules on CT or chest X-ray
2. Biopsy of nodule to evaluate malignancy
3. If necessary, treatment of nodule through surgery, radiotherapy, and chemotherapy (curative approach) or through chemoembolization and ablation (palliative approach)

A hybrid operating room supports steps 2 and 3 (if surgery is performed) of this workflow:

==== Biopsy ====
Small lung nodules identified on a thorax CT need to be examined for malignancy, thus a small portion of sample tissue is taken out in a needle procedure. The needle is advanced through the bronchial tree, or trans-thoracically, toward the position of the nodule. To make sure tissue is captured from the nodule as opposed to accidentally taking healthy lung tissue, imaging modalities such as mobile C-arms, ultrasound, or bronchoscopes are used. The yield rate of biopsies in small nodules is reported to be between 33 and 50% in tumors smaller than 3 cm.

To increase the yield rate, advanced interventional imaging with angiographic C-arms has proven to be beneficial. The advantage of intra-procedural imaging is that the patient and the diaphragm are in exactly the same position during 2D/3D imaging and the actual biopsy. Hence the accuracy is usually much higher than using pre-operative data. Rotational angiography visualizes the bronchial tree in 3D during the procedure. The air thereby serves as a 'natural' contrast agent, thus the nodules are well visible. On this 3D image, using dedicated software, the nodules can be marked, along with a planned needle path for the biopsy (endobronchially or trans-thoracically). These images can then be overlaid on live fluoroscopy. This gives the pulmonologist improved guidance toward the nodules. Yield rates of 90% in nodules of 1–2 cm, and 100% in nodules > 2 cm have been reported with this approach.

==== Surgery ====
Video-assisted thoracoscopic surgery is a minimally-invasive technique to resect lung nodules that saves the patient the trauma of a thoracotomy. Thereby, small ports are used to access the pulmonary lobes and introduce a camera on a thoracoscope, along with the necessary instruments. While this procedure speeds up recovery and potentially reduces complications, the loss of natural vision and tactile sensing makes it difficult for the surgeon to locate the nodules, especially in cases of non-superficial, ground-glass opaque, and small lesions. The yield rate for nodules < 1 cm can be below 40% as studies show. As a consequence sometimes more healthy tissue is resected than actually necessary in order to avoid missing (parts of) the lesion. Using advanced intra-operative imaging in the operating rooms helps to precisely locate and resect the lesion in a potentially tissue-sparing and quick fashion. In order to be able to use image guidance during video-assisted thoracoscopic surgery, rotational angiography has to be performed before the introduction of ports, thus before the lobe in question deflates. This way the lesion is visible through the natural contrast of air. In a second step, hook wires, thread needles, or contrast agent (lipiodol, iopamidol) are introduced into or next to the lesion to ensure visibility on the angiogram after lung deflation. Then, the conventional part of video-assisted thoracoscopic surgery starts with the introduction of thoracoscopes. The imaging system is used in fluoroscopic mode now, where both the inserted instruments and the previously marked lesion are well visible. A precise resection is now possible. In case contrast agent has been used to mark the lesion, it will also drain into the regional lymph nodes, which then can be resected within the same procedure.

=== Orthopedic trauma surgery ===
Complex fractures like pelvis fractures, calcaneal, or tibia head fractures, etc. need an exact placement of screws and other surgical implants to allow quickest possible treatment of the patients. Minimally invasive surgical approaches result in less trauma for the patient and quicker recovery. However, the risk of malpositionins, revisions, and nerval damage cannot be underestimated (Malposition and revision rates of different imaging modalities for percutaneous iliosacral screw fixation following pelvic fractures: a systematic review and meta-analysis). The possibility of the use of an angio system with a spatial resolution of 0.1 mm, the large field of view to image the entire pelvis in one image and the high kW rate allows the surgeon high precision images while not impairing hygiene (floor-mounted systems) or access to the patient (CT). Degenerative spine surgery, traumatic spinal fractures, oncologic fractures, or scoliosis surgery are other types of surgery that can be optimized in a hybrid OR. The large field of view and the high kW rate allow to optimally image even obese patients. Navigations systems or the use of integrated laser guidance can support and improve the workflow.

=== Laparoscopic surgery ===
As in other minimally invasive surgery, not everybody in the surgical community did not believe in this technology. Today it is the gold standard for many types of surgery. Starting with a simple appendectomy, cholecystectomy, partial kidney resections and partial liver resections, the laparoscopic approach is expanding. The image quality, the possibility of imaging the patient in the surgical position and the guidance of the instruments facilitate this approach.(Efficacy of DynaCT for surgical navigation during complex laparoscopic surgery: an initial experience. Partial resection of the kidney, leaving as much healthy tissue, meaning kidney function to the patient has been described.). The challenges the surgeons face is the loss of natural 3D vision and tactile sensing. Through small ports he/she has to rely on the images provided by the endoscope and is unable to feel the tissue. In a hybrid operating room the anatomy can be updated and imaged in real time. 3D images can be fused and/or overlaid on live fluoroscopy or the endoscope. (Real-time image guidance in laparoscopic liver surgery: first clinical experience with a guidance system based on intraoperative CT imaging.) Crucial anatomy like vessels or a tumor can be avoided and complications reduced. Further investigations are under trial at the moment. (Surgical navigation in urology: European perspective)

=== Emergency care ===
For the treatment of trauma patients, every minute counts. Patients with severe bleeding after car accidents, explosions, gunshot wounds, aortic dissections, etc. need immediate care due to the life-threatening blood loss. In a hybrid operating room both open and endovascular treatment of the patient can be performed. For example, the tension in the brain due to a severe haemorrhage can be relieved and the aneurysm can be coiled. The concept of placing the emergency patient on an operating table as soon as he/she enters the hospital, if stable perform a trauma scan in the CT or if unstable immediate procedure in the hybrid operating room without having to reposition the patient can save valuable time and reduce risk of further injury.

== Imaging techniques ==
=== Imaging techniques with a fixed C-arm ===
==== Fluoroscopy and data acquisition ====
Fluoroscopy is performed with continuous X-ray to guide the progression of a catheter or other devices within the body in live images. To depict even fine anatomic structures and devices, brilliant image quality is required. In particular, in cardiac interventions, imaging the moving heart requires a high frame rate (30 fps , 50 Hz) and high power output (at least 80 kW). Image quality needed for cardiac applications can only be achieved by high powered fixed angiography systems, not with mobile C-arms.

Angiographic systems provide a so-called acquisition mode, which stores the acquired images automatically on the system to be uploaded into an image archive later. While standard fluoroscopy is predominantly used to guide devices and to re-position the field of view, data acquisition is applied for reporting or diagnostic purposes. In particular, when contrast media is injected, a data acquisition is mandatory, because the stored sequences can be replayed as often as required without re-injection of contrast media. To achieve a sufficient image quality for diagnoses and reporting, the angiographic system uses up to 10 times higher X-ray doses than standard fluoroscopy. Thus, data acquisition should be applied only when truly necessary. Data acquisition serves as a base for advanced imaging techniques such as DSA and rotational angiography.

==== Rotational angiography ====
Rotational angiography is a technique to acquire CT-like 3D images intraoperatively with a fixed C-arm. To do that, the C-arm is rotated around the patient, acquiring a series of projections that will be reconstructed to a 3D data set.

==== Digital subtraction angiography ====
Digital subtraction angiography (DSA) is a two-dimensional imaging technique for the visualization of blood vessels in the human body (Katzen, 1995).

For DSA, the same sequence of a projection is acquired without and then with contrast agent injection through the vessels under investigation. The first image is subtracted from the second to remove background structures such as bones as completely as possible and show the contrast-filled vessels more clearly. As there is a time lag between the acquisition of the first and the second image, motion correction algorithms are necessary to remove movement artifacts.

An advanced application of DSA is road mapping. From the acquired DSA sequence, the image frame with maximum vessel opacification is identified and assigned to be the so-called road-map mask. This mask is continuously subtracted from live fluoroscopy images to produce real-time subtracted fluoroscopic images overlaid on a static image of the vasculature. The clinical benefit is better visualization of small and complex vascular structures without distracting underlying tissue to support the placement of catheters and wires.

==== 2D/3D registration ====
===== Fusion imaging and 2D/3D overlay =====
Modern angiographic systems are not just used for imaging, but support the surgeon also during the procedure by guiding the intervention based on 3D information acquired either pre-operatively or intra-operatively. Such guidance requires that the 3D information is registered to the patient. This is done using special proprietary software algorithms.

===== Information flow between workstation and angiographic system =====
3D images are calculated from a set of projections acquired during a rotation of the C-arm around the patient. The volume reconstruction is performed on a separate workstation. The C-arm and the workstation are connected a communicate continuously. For example, when the user virtually rotates the volume on the workstation to view the anatomy from a certain perspective, the parameter of this view can be transmitted to the angio system, which then drives the C-arm to exactly the same perspective for fluoroscopy. In the same way, if the C-arm angulation is changed, this angulation can be transmitted to the workstation which updates the volume to the same perspective as the fluoroscopic view. The software algorithm that stands behind this process is called registration and can also be done with other DICOM images, such as CT or magnetic resonance tomography data acquired preoperatively.

===== Overlay of 3D information on top of 2D fluoroscopy =====
The 3D image itself can be overlaid colour-coded on top of the fluoroscopic image. Any change of the angulations of the C-arm will cause the workstation to re-calculate in real-time the view on the 3D image to match exactly the view of the live 2D fluoroscopy image. Without additional contrast agent injection the surgeon can observe device movements simultaneously with the 3D overlay of the vessel contours in the fluoroscopy image. An alternative way to add information from the workstation to the fluoroscopic image is to overlay, after either manual or automatic segmentation of the anatomical structures of interest in the 3D image, the outline as a contour onto the fluoroscopic image. This provides additional information that is not visible in the fluoroscopic image. Some software available provides landmarks automatically, more can be added manually be the surgeon or a qualified technician. One example is the placement of a fenestrated stentgraft to treat an abdominal aortic aneurysm. The ostia of the renal arteries can be circled on the 3D image and then overlaid on the live fluoroscopy. As the marking has been done in 3D, it will update with any change of the fluoroscopy angulation to match the current view.

===== Guidance during trans-aortic valve implantation =====
Trans-Aortic Valve Implantation requires exact positioning of the valve in the aortic root to prevent complications. A good fluoroscopic view is essential, whereby an exact perpendicular angle to the aortic root is considered to be optimal for the implantation. Recently, applications have been released which support the surgeon in selecting this optimal fluoroscopy angulation or even drive the C-arm automatically into the perpendicular view to the aortic root. Some approaches are based on pre-operative CT images, which are used to segment the aorta and calculate optimal viewing angles for valve implantations. CT images must be registered with C-arm CT or fluoroscopic images to transfer the 3D volume to the actual angiographic system. Errors during the registration process might result in diversification from the optimal angulations of the C-arm and must be manually corrected. Additionally, anatomical variations between the acquisition of the pre-operatively CT image and surgery are not accounted for. Patients are generally imaged with hands-up in a CT scanner while surgery is performed with arms aside the patient, which leads to substantial errors. Algorithms purely based on C-arm CT images acquired in operating rooms by the angiographic system are inherently registered to the patient and show the present anatomy structures. With such an approach, the surgeon does not rely on pre-operative CT images acquired by the radiology department, which simplifies the workflow in the operating room and reduces errors in the process.

==== Functional imaging in the operating room ====
Improvements of the C-arm technology nowadays also enable perfusion imaging and can visualize parenchymal blood volume in the OR. To do that, rotational angiography (3D-DSA) is combined with a modified injection protocol and a special reconstruction algorithm. The blood flow can then be visualized in the course of time. This can be useful in the treatments of patients with ischemic stroke.

=== Imaging techniques with a CT ===
A CT system mounted on rails can be moved into and out of an operating room to support complex surgical procedures, such as brain, spine, and trauma surgery with additional information through imaging. The Johns Hopkins Bayview Medical Center in Maryland describes that their intra-operative CT usage has a positive impact on patient outcomes by improving safety, decreasing infections, and lowering the risks of complications.

=== Imaging techniques with magnetic resonance tomography ===
Magnetic resonance imaging is used in neurosurgery:

1. Before surgery to enable precise planning
2. During surgery to support decision making and accounting for brain shift
3. After surgery to evaluate the outcome

An magnetic resonance tomography system usually requires a lot of space both in the room and around the patient. It is not possible to perform surgery in a regular magnetic resonance tomography room. Thus for step 2, there are two ways to use magnetic resonance scanners interoperatively. One is a moveable magnetic resonance tomography scanner that can be brought in only when imaging is needed, the other is to transport the patient to a scanner in an adjacent room during surgery.

== Planning considerations ==
=== Location and organization ===
Not only the usage of a hybrid operating room is "hybrid", but also its role within the hospital system. As it holds an imaging modality, the radiology department could take the lead responsibility for the room for expertise in handling, technical, maintenance, and connectivity reasons. From a patient workflow perspective, the room could be run by their surgical department and should rather be situated next to other surgical facilities, to ensure proper patient care and fast transportation.

=== Room size and preparation ===
Installing a hybrid operating room is a challenge to standard hospital room sizes, as not only the imaging system requires some additional space, but there are also more people in the room as in a normal OR. A team of 8 to 20 people including anesthesiologists, surgeons, nurses, technicians, perfusionists, support staff from device companies, etc. can work in such an OR. Depending on the imaging system chosen, a room size of 70 square meters including a control room but excluding a technical room and the preparation areas is recommended. Additional preparations of the room necessary are 2-3mm lead shielding and potentially enforcement of the floor or ceiling to hold the additional weight of the imaging system (approximately 650–1800 kg).

=== Workflow ===
Planning a hybrid operating room requires to involve a considerable number of stakeholders. To ensure a smooth workflow in the room, all parties working there need to state their requirements, which will impact the room design and determining various resources like space, medical, and imaging equipment. This may require professional project management and several iterations in the planning process with the vendor of the imaging system, as technical interdependencies are complex. The result is always an individual solution tailored to the needs and preferences of the interdisciplinary team and the hospital.

=== Lights, monitors, and booms ===
In general, two different light sources are needed in an operating room: the surgical (operating) lights used for open procedures and the ambient lighting for interventional procedures. Particular attention should be paid to the possibility to dim the lights. This is frequently needed during fluoroscopy or endoscopy. For the surgical lights it is most important that they cover the complete area across the operating table. Moreover, they must not interfere with head heights and collision paths of other equipment. The most frequent mounting position of OR-lights is centrally above the operating table. If a different position is chosen, the lights usually are swiveled in from an area outside the operating table. Because one central axis per light head is necessary, this may lead to at least two central axes and mounting points in order to ensure sufficient illumination of the surgical field. The movement range of the angiography system determines the positioning of the operating room lights. Central axes must be outside of moving path and swivel range. This is especially important as devices have defined room height requirements that must be met. In this case, head clearance height for the OR-light may be an issue. This makes lights a critical item in the planning and design process. Other aspects in the planning process of operating room lights include avoidance of glare and reflections. Modern operating room operating room lights may have additional features, like built-in camera and video capabilities. For the illumination of the wound area, a double-arm OR-light system is required. Sometimes even a third light may be required, in cases where more than one surgical activity takes place at the same time, e.g. vein stripping of the legs. In summary, the key topics for planning the surgical light system include:

- Central location above the operating table (consideration in planning with ceiling mounted systems).
- Usually three light heads for optimal illumination of multiple surgical fields
- Suspension accommodating unrestricted, independent movement, and stable positioning of light heads
- Modular system with options for extension, e.g. video monitor and/or camera.

=== Imaging systems ===
The most common imaging modality to be used in hybrid ORs is a C-arm. Expert consensus rates the performance of mobile C-arms in hybrid ORs as insufficient, because the limited power of the tube impacts image quality, the field of view is smaller for image-intensifier systems than for flat-panel detector systems and the cooling system of mobile C-arms can lead to overheating after just a few hours, which can be too short for lengthy surgical procedures or for multiple procedures in a row, that would be needed to recover the investment in such a room.

Fixed C-arms do not have these limitations, but require more space in the room. These systems can be mounted either on the floor, the ceiling, or both if a biplane system is chosen. The latter is the system of choice if pediatric cardiologists, electrophysiologists, or neurointerventionalists are major users of the room. It is not recommended to implement a biplane system if not clearly required by these clinical disciplines, as ceiling-mounted components may raise hygienic issues: In fact, some hospitals do not allow operating parts directly above the surgical field, because dust may fall in the wound and cause infection. Since any ceiling-mounted system includes moving parts above the surgical field and impairs the laminar airflow, such systems are not the right option for hospitals enforcing highest hygienic standards. (see also and, both German only)

There are more factors to consider when deciding between ceiling- and floor-mounted systems. Ceiling-mounted systems require substantial ceiling space and, therefore, reduce the options to install surgical lights or booms. Nonetheless, many hospitals choose ceiling-mounted systems because they cover the whole body with more flexibility and – most importantly – without moving the table. The latter is sometimes a difficult and dangerous undertaking during surgery with the many lines and catheters that must also be moved. Moving from a parking to a working position during surgery, however, is easier with a floor-mounted system, because the C-arm just turns in from the side and does not interfere with the anesthesiologist. The ceiling-mounted system, by contrast, during surgery can hardly move to a parking position at the head end without colliding with anesthesia equipment. In an overcrowded environment like the OR, biplane systems add to the complexity and interfere with anesthesia, except for neurosurgery, where anesthesia is not at the head end. Monoplane systems are therefore clearly recommended for rooms mainly used for cardiac surgery.

=== Operating table ===
The selection of the operating table depends on the primary use of the system. Interventional tables with floating table tops and tilt and cradle compete with fully integrated flexible operating tables. Identification of the right table is a compromise between interventional and surgical requirements. Surgical and interventional requirements may be mutually exclusive. Surgeons, especially orthopedic, general, and neurosurgeons usually expect a table with a segmented tabletop for flexible patient positioning. For imaging purposes, a radiolucent tabletop, allowing full body coverage, is required. Therefore, non-breakable carbon fibre tabletops are used.

Interventionalists require a floating tabletop to allow fast and precise movements during angiography. Cardiac and vascular surgeons, in general, have less complex positioning needs, but based on their interventional experience in angiography may be used to having fully motorized movements of the table and the tabletop. For positioning patients on non breakable tabletops, positioning aids are available, i.e. inflatable cushions. Truly floating tabletops are not available with conventional operating tables. As a compromise, floatable angiography tables specifically made for surgery with vertical and lateral tilt are recommended. To further accommodate typical surgical needs, side rails for mounting surgical equipment like retractors or limb holders should be available for the table.

The position of the table in the room also impacts surgical workflow. A diagonal position in the operating room may be considered in order to gain space and flexibility in the room, as well as access to the patient from all sides. Alternatively, a conventional surgery table can be combined with an imaging system if the vendor offers a corresponding integration. The operating room can then be used either with a radiotranslucent non-breakable tabletop that supports 3D imaging, or with a universal breakable tabletop that provides enhanced patient positioning, but restricts 3D imaging. The latter are particularly suited for neurosurgery or orthopedic surgery, and these integrated solutions recently also became commercially available. If it is planned to share the room for hybrid and open conventional procedures, these are sometimes preferred. They provide greater workflow flexibility because the tabletops are dockable and can be easily exchanged, but require some compromises with interventional imaging.

In summary, important aspects to be included considered are the position in the room, radiolucency (carbon fiber tabletop), compatibility, and integration of imaging devices with the operating table. Further aspects include table load, adjustable table height, and horizontal mobility (floating) including vertical and lateral tilt. It is important to also have proper accessories available, such as rails for mounting special surgical equipment retractors, camera holder). Free-floating angiography tables with tilt and cradle capabilities are best suited for cardiovascular hybrid operating rooms.

== Radiation dose ==
X-ray radiation is ionizing radiation, thus exposure is potentially harmful. Compared to a mobile C-arm, which is classically used in surgery, CT scanners and fixed C-arms work on a much higher energy level, which induces higher dose. Therefore, it is very important to monitor radiation dose applied in a hybrid operating room both for the patient and the medical staff.

There are a few simple measures to protect people in the operating room from scattered radiation, thus lowering their dose. Awareness is one critical issue, otherwise the available protection tools might be neglected. Among these tools is protective clothing in the form of a protective apron for the trunk, a protective thyroid shield around the neck and protective glasses. The later may be replaced by a ceiling-suspended lead glass panel. Additional lead curtains can be installed at the table side to protect the lower body region. Even more restrictive rules apply to pregnant staff members.

A very effective measure of both protection to both the staff and the patient of course is applying less radiation. There is always a trade-off between radiation dose and image quality. A higher X-ray dose leads to a clearer picture. Modern software technology can improve image quality during post-processing, such that the same image quality is reached with a lower dose. Image quality thereby is described by contrast, noise, resolution, and artifacts. In general, the ALARA principle (as low as reasonably achievable) should be followed. Dose should be as low as possible, but image quality can only be reduced to the level that the diagnostic benefit of the examination is still higher than the potential harm to the patient.

There are both technical measures taking by X-ray equipment manufacturers to reduce dose constantly and handling options for the staff to reduce dose depending on the clinical application. Among the former is beam hardening. Among the latter are frame rate settings, pulsed fluoroscopy, and collimation.

Beam hardening: X-ray radiation consists of hard and soft particles, i.e. particles with a lot of energy and particles with little energy. Unnecessary exposure is mostly caused by soft particles, as they are too weak to pass through the body and interact with it. Hard particles, by contrast, pass through the patient. A filter in front of the X-ray tube can catch the soft particles, thus hardening the beam. This decreases dose without impacting image quality.

Frame rate: High frame rates (images acquired per second) are needed to visualize fast motion without stroboscopic effects. However, the higher the frame rate, the higher the radiation dose. Therefore, the frame rate should be chosen according to the clinical need and be as low as reasonably possible. For example, in pediatric cardiology, frame rates of 60 pulses per second are required compared to 0.5 p/s for slowly moving objects. A reduction to half pulse rate reduces dose by about half. The reduction from 30 p/s to 7.5 p/s reduces dose to about 25%.

When using pulsed fluoroscopy, radiation dose is only applied in prespecified intervals of time, thus less dose is used to produce the same image sequence. For the time in between, the last image stored is displayed.

Another tool for decreasing dose is collimation. It may be that from the field of view provided by the detector, only a small part is interesting for the intervention. The X-ray tube can be shielded at the parts that are not necessary to be visible by a collimator, thus only sending dose to the detector for the body parts in question. Modern C-arms enable to navigate on acquired images without constant fluoroscopy.
