= Hybrid coronary revascularization =

Type of heart surgery

- Other names: Hybrid coronary bypass
- Specialty: Cardiology

Hybrid coronary revascularization (HCR) or hybrid coronary bypass is a relatively new type of heart surgery that provides an alternative to traditional coronary artery bypass surgery (CABG) or percutaneous coronary intervention (PCI or PTCA) by combining the two into one operation. It is this combining aspect that "hybrid" refers to. HCR is one of several types of hybrid cardiac surgery; it is not to be confused with a MIDCAB (minimally invasive direct coronary artery bypass) procedure, which uses the smaller thoracotomy incision but does not involve coronary stenting.

== Benefits ==
Hybrid bypass offers all the benefits of a MIDCAB, although there are some disadvantages.

1. A much smaller incision (made through the rib cage as opposed to cutting the sternum and opening the rib cage) than with traditional bypass surgery.
2. Less pain for the patient and quicker recovery time. Particularly in high risk patients, morbidity and mortality decreases in comparison to conventional surgery. A study from FuWai Hospital in Beijing reports on 104 patients with multivessel coronary artery disease who were compared with the same sized group of patients undergoing off pump surgery using propensity score matching. The patients treated with the hybrid approach had a significantly lower ICU stay and intubation time and experienced less complications in terms of bleeding and transfusions needs. At a median follow up of 18 months, patients undergoing the hybrid procedure also had a significantly higher freedom from major adverse cardiac or cerebrovascular events (99% vs. 90.4%; p = 0.03). HCR is also associated with a significant decrease in the need for blood transfusion and a significant reduction in the duration of intubation.
3. Less risk of complications, infections etc. and also decreases the necessity for two separate cardiac procedures (bypass and stenting). However, it requires the implementation of suitable X-ray equipment in the OR, i.e. a hybrid operating room. Helpful in this regard is the regular use of completion angiography. In a study designed and published by the Vanderbilt Heart and Vascular Institute, routine intraoperative completion angiography performed in a fully functional hybrid operation room detected important defects in 97 of 796 (12% of the grafts) venous coronary artery bypass grafts in 366 adult patients (14% of the patients) with complex coronary artery disease. Their findings in completion angiography at the end of the operation included suboptimal anastomoses, poor lie of the venous bypass graft, and bypasses to not diseased vessels. The angiography findings led to a change in the management, including minor adjustments of the graft, traditional surgical revision or percutaneous coronary interventions, resulting in optimal bypass outcomes. However, early perioperative angiography is not recommended nor it is a standard practice; therefore, in the case of suspected early postoperative myocardial ischemia, immediate angiography should be performed to verify patency of the grafts.
4. In the study from FuWai, the hybrid procedure was also less costly than an exclusively percutaneous strategy.

A 2018 Meta Analysis with over 4000 patient cases found HCR to have significant advantages compared with conventional CABG. Reduced incidence of Blood Transfusion, reduced hospital stay duration and reduced intubation duration were all reported. In contrast, HCR was found to be significantly more expensive compared to CABG. However, 2018 guidelines recommend (Level 2B recommendation) that hybrid coronary revascularization may be considered in specific patient subsets at experienced centres.

== See also ==
- Heart disease
