= Holy Family Hospital =

Holy Family Hospital may refer to:

- Holy Family Hospital, Rawalpindi, Pakistan
- Holy Family Hospital, Karachi, Pakistan
- Holy Family Hospital, Mumbai, India
- Holy Family Hospital (New Delhi), India
- Holy Family Hospital (Methuen), Methuen, Massachusetts, formerly part of the Steward Health Care System
- Holy Family Hospital (Spokane), Spokane, Washington
- Holy Family Hospital (Bethlehem), Bethlehem, Palestine
- Holy Family Red Crescent Medical College Hospital, Dhaka, Bangladesh
