= Cone beam computed tomography =

Medical imaging technique

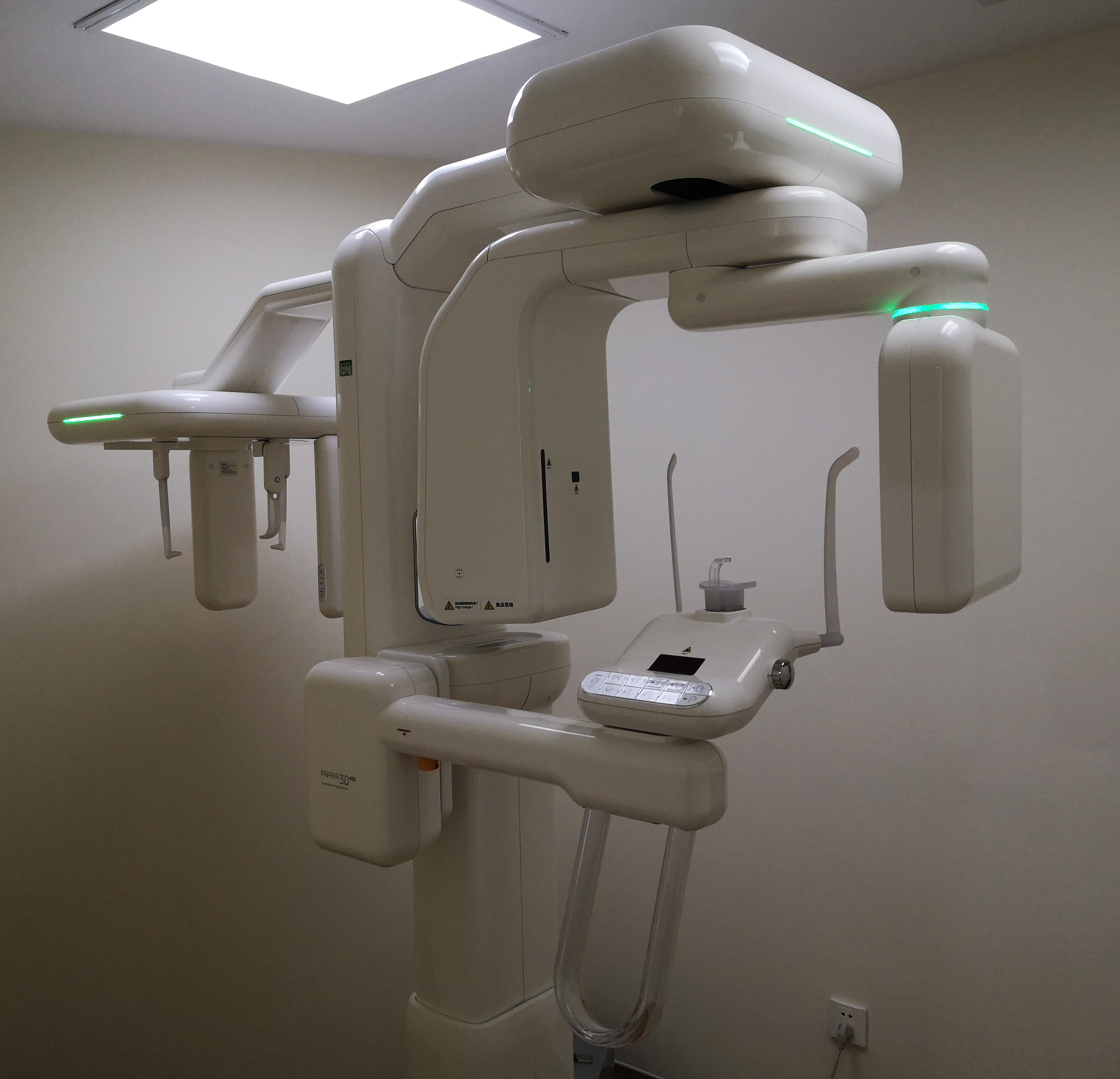
- Cone Beam CT scanner
- MeSH: D054894

Cone beam computed tomography (or CBCT, also referred to as C-arm CT, cone beam volume CT, flat panel CT or Digital Volume Tomography (DVT)) is a medical imaging technique consisting of X-ray computed tomography where the X-rays are divergent, forming a cone.

CBCT has become increasingly important in treatment planning and diagnosis in implant dentistry, ENT, orthopedics, and interventional radiology (IR), among other things. Because of increased access to the technology, CBCT scanners are now widely used in dentistry, such as in the fields of oral surgery, endodontics and orthodontics. Integrated CBCT is also an important tool for patient positioning and verification in image-guided radiation therapy (IGRT).

During dental and orthodontic imaging, the CBCT scanner rotates around the patient's head, acquiring up to 600 distinct images. For interventional radiology, the patient is positioned offset to the table so that the region of interest is centered in the field of view for the cone beam. A single 200 degree rotation over the region of interest acquires a volumetric data set. The scanning software collects the data and reconstructs it, producing what is termed a digital volume composed of three-dimensional voxels of anatomical data that can then be manipulated and visualized with specialized software. CBCT shares many similarities with traditional (fan beam) CT however there are important differences, particularly for reconstruction. CBCT has been described as the gold standard for imaging the oral and maxillofacial area.

== History ==
=== Oral and Maxillofacial Radiology ===
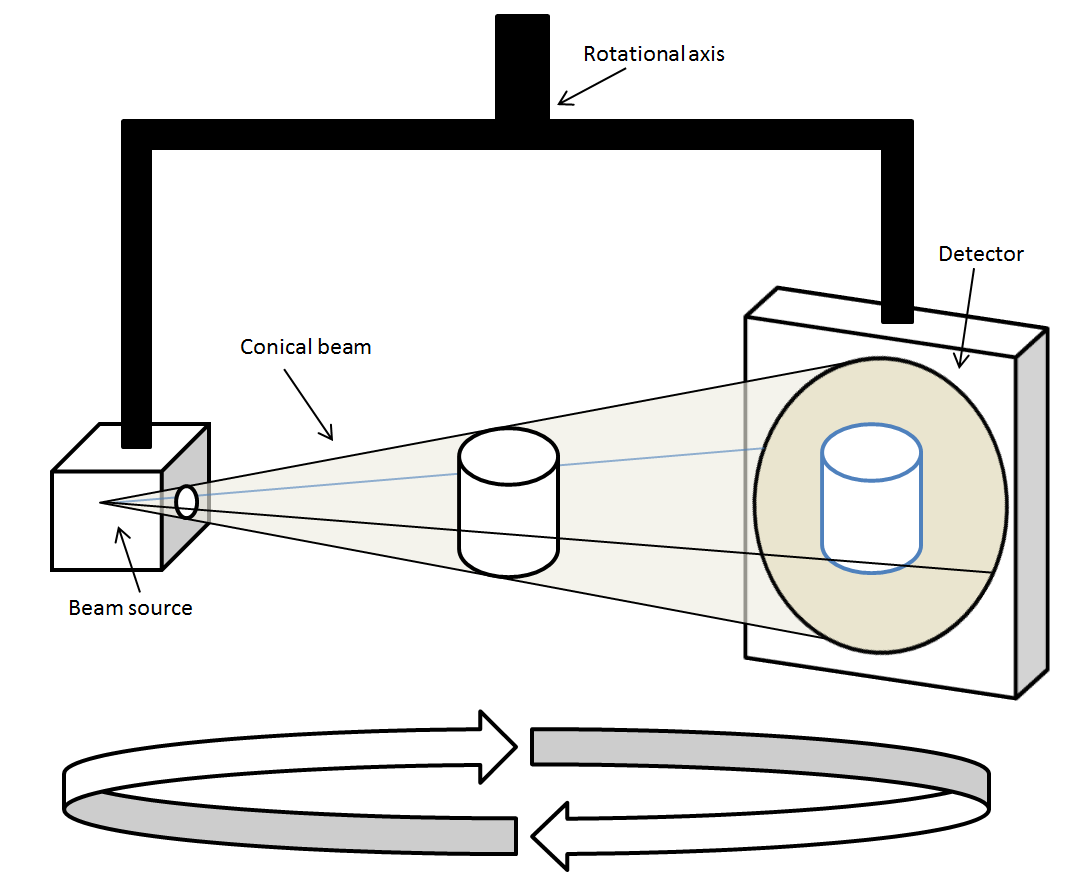
Principle of CBCT.

In the late 1990s, Dr Yoshinori Arai in Japan and Dr Piero Mozzo in Italy independently developed Cone Beam Computed Technology for oral and maxillofacial radiology. The first commercial system (the NewTom 9000) was introduced in the European market in 1996 and into the US market in 2001, by Italian company Quantitative Radiology (also known as QR, based in Verona).

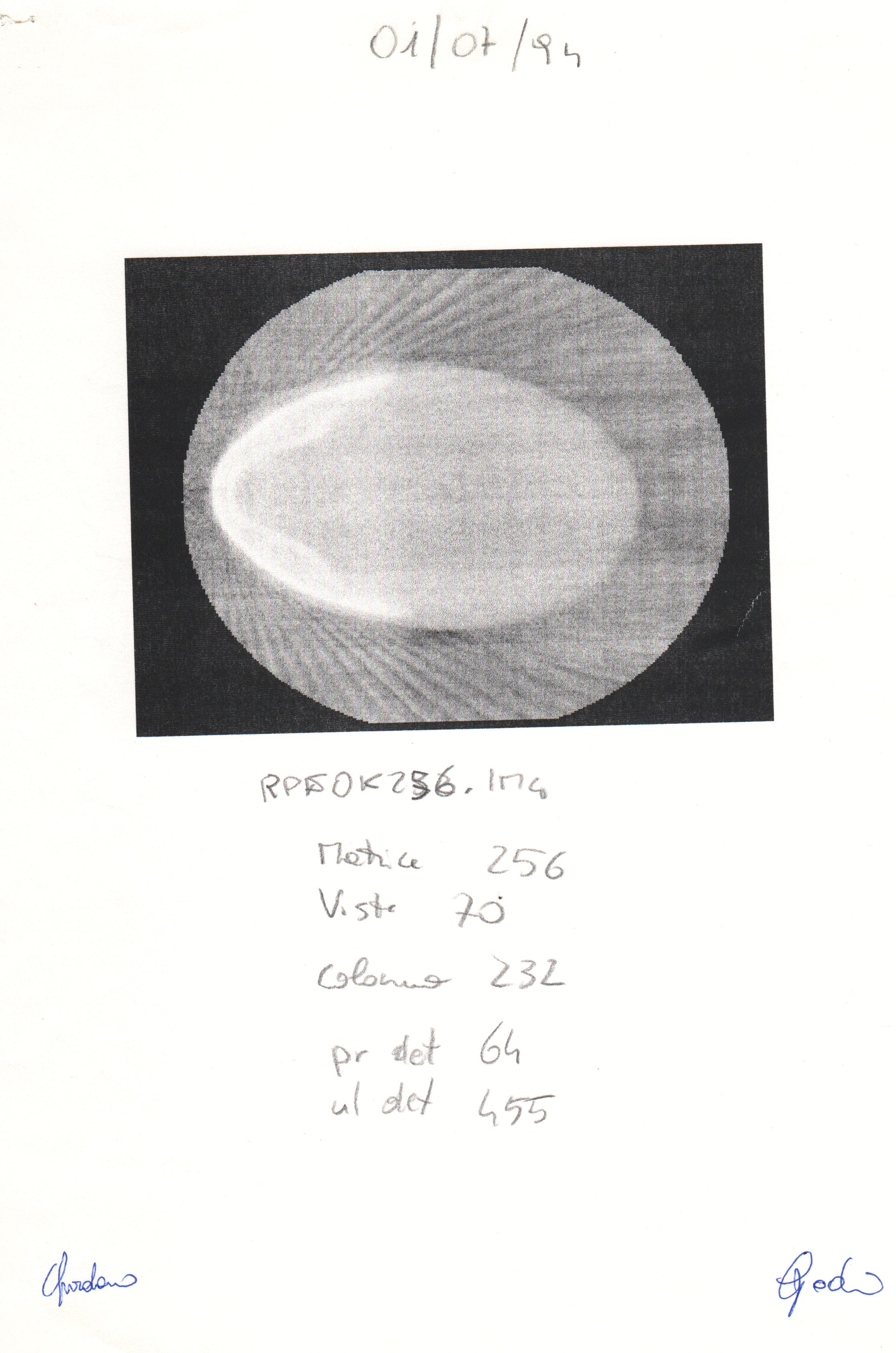
Axial image obtained from the first Cone-Beam 3D Scan performed on July 1, 1994

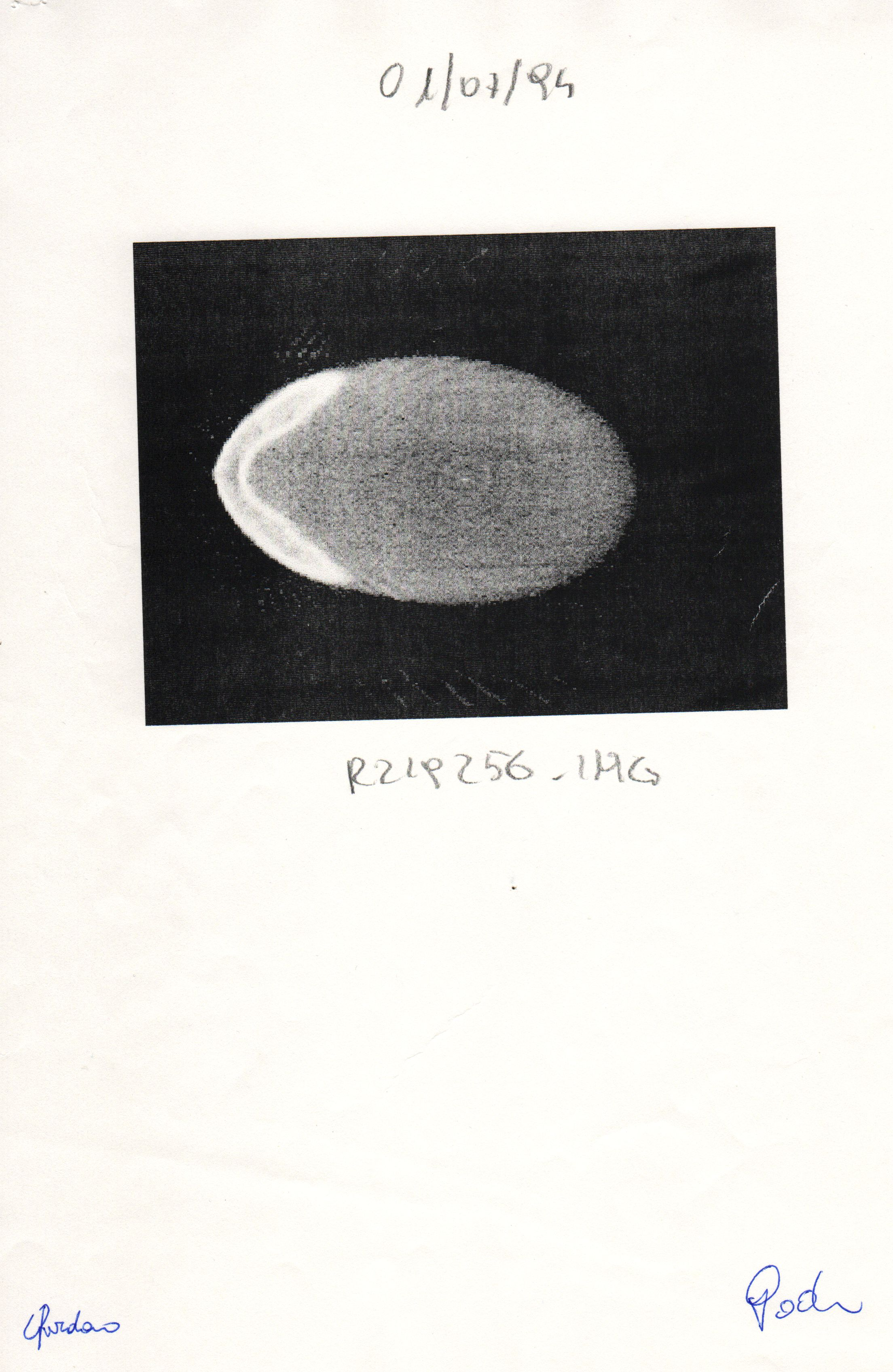
Axial image obtained from the first Cone-Beam 3D Scan performed on July 1, 1994

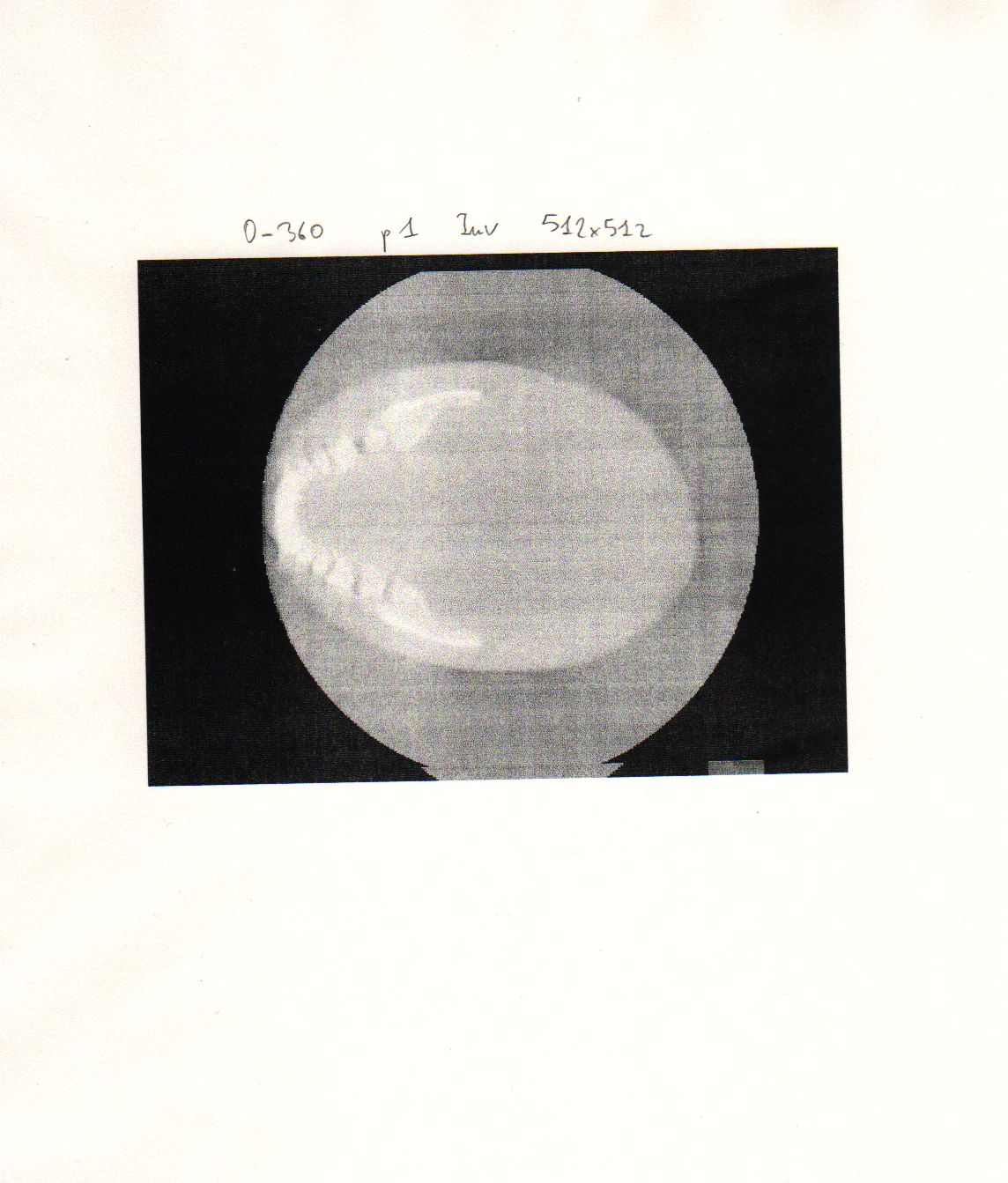
Axial image obtained from the first Cone-Beam 3D Scan performed on July 1, 1994

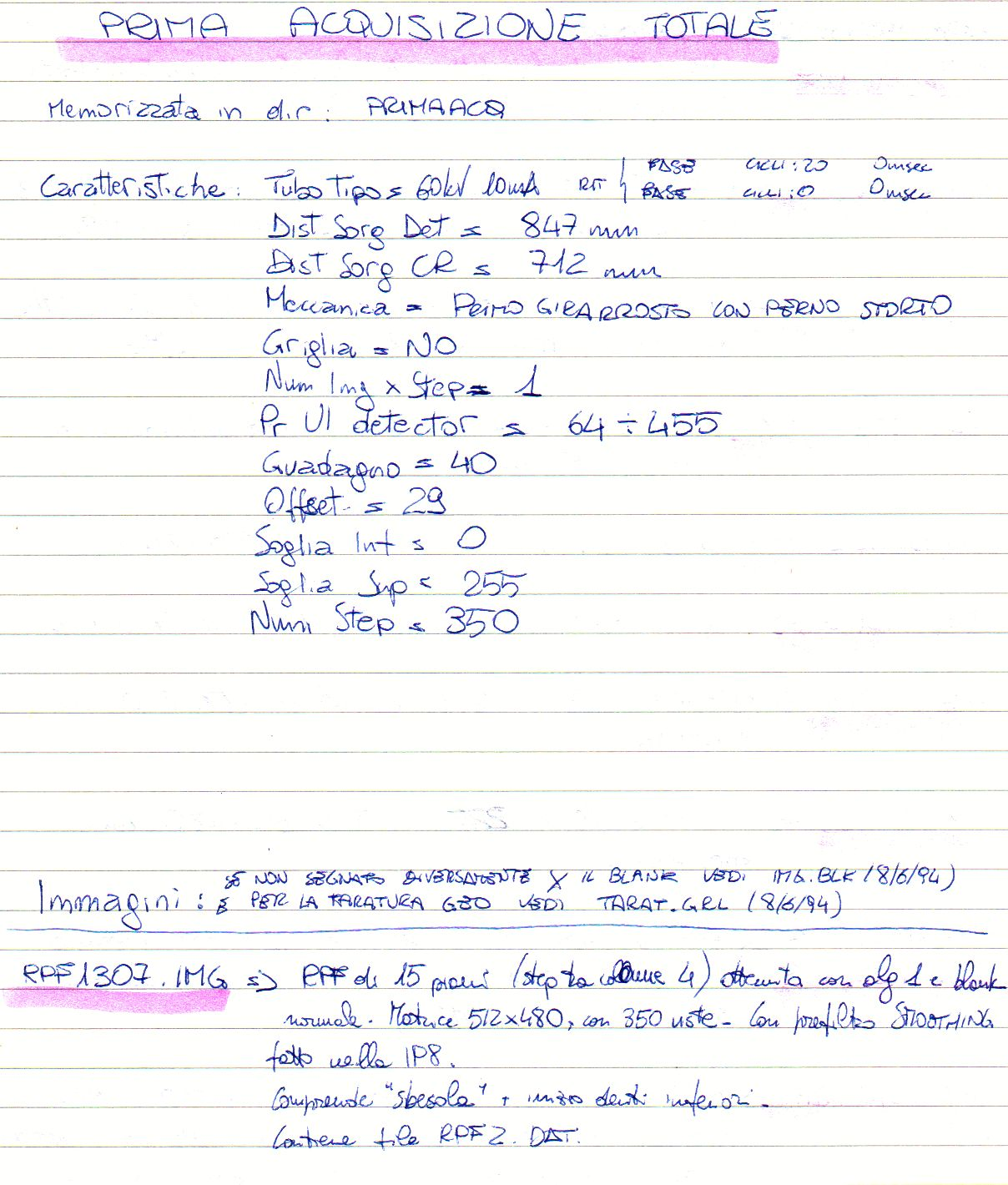
Original notes about the first Cone-Beam 3D Scan performed on July 1, 1994

=== Radiotherapy ===
Cone beam CT using kilovoltage X-rays (as used for diagnostic, rather than therapeutic purposes) attached to a linear accelerator treatment machine was first developed in the late 1990s and early 2000s. Such systems have since become common on latest generation linacs. In the late 2010s CBCT also started to become available on-board particle therapy delivery systems.

=== Interventional radiology ===
While CBCT with X-ray image intensifiers was experimented with in the late 1990s, it was not until the adoption of flat-panel X-ray detectors, with improved contrast and spatial resolution, that CBCT became practical for clinical use in interventional radiology procedures. Many fixed, and even mobile, C-arm fluoroscopy systems are now capable of CBCT acquisitions, in addition to traditional planar fluoroscopy. CBCT provides image guidance during interventional radiology procedures for conditions such as knee osteoarthritis, benign prostatic hyperplasia, and hepatocellular carcinoma.

== Applications ==
=== Endodontics ===
Impacted wisdom tooth seen on CBCT.

The most significant advantage of the CBCT in Endodontics is that it can show critical root canal anatomical features that conventional intraoral or panoramic images cannot.

According to the American Association of Endodontics, there are numerous specific situations in which 3D images produced by CBCT enhance diagnosis and influence treatment, and its use cannot be disputed over conventional intraoral radiology based on ALARA principles.

=== Implantology ===
A dental cone beam scan offers useful information when it comes to the assessment and planning of surgical implants. The American Academy of Oral and Maxillofacial Radiology (AAOMR) suggests cone-beam CT as the preferred method for presurgical assessment of dental implant sites.

=== Orthodontics ===
As a 3D rendition, CBCT offers an undistorted view of the dentition that can be used to accurately visualize both erupted and non-erupted teeth, tooth root orientation and anomalous structures, that conventional 2D radiography cannot.

Processing example using x-ray data from a tooth model:

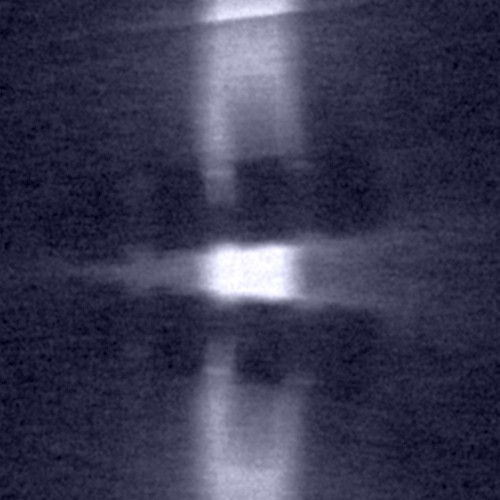
single sampled (noisy) image

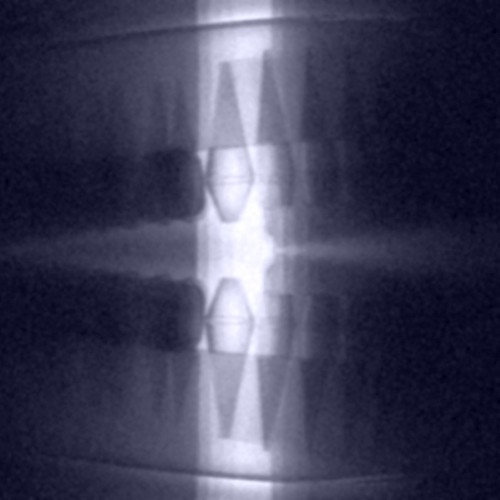
several samples overlay

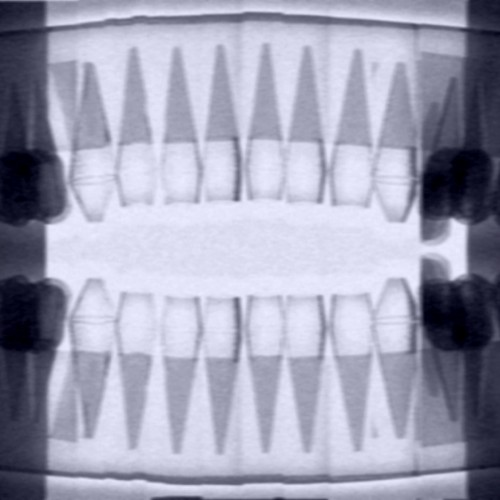
joined images to panoramic

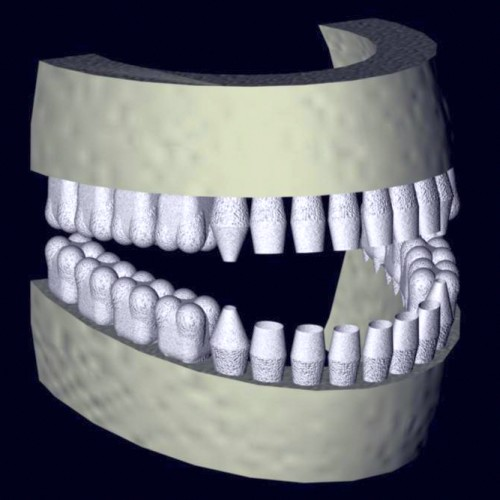
algorithmic reconstruction

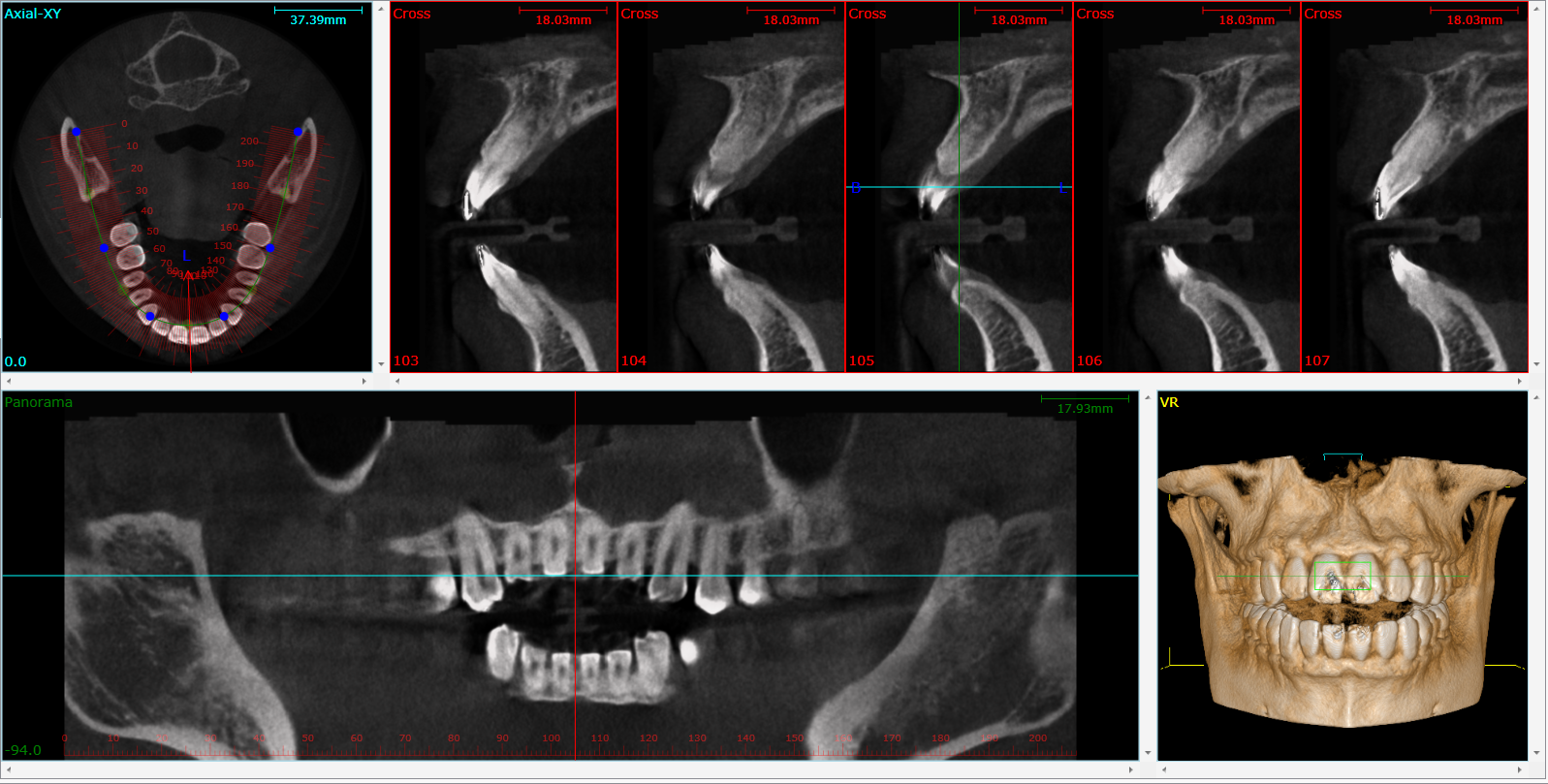
in-vivo image

=== Orthopedics ===
The CBCT scanner offers undistorted views of the extremities. One advantage of orthopedic CBCT is the ability to take weight bearing images of the lower extremities. In the realm of the foot and ankle particularly, weight bearing CBCT is gaining momentum due to its ability to combine 3 dimensional and weight bearing information which are of the utmost importance in diagnosis and surgical planning. The preferred term used for CBCT in the lower limb is thus WBCT for Weight Bearing CT following the first scientific publications on the subject.

=== Image-guided radiation therapy ===
Image-guided radiation therapy is a form of external beam radiotherapy where the patient is positioned with the organs to be treated accurately matched in position to the treatment field, to reduce the dose to nearby organs which are not being treated. Many organs inside the body move by millimeters relative to the external skin surfaces, and a CBCT scanner mounted on the head of the radiotherapy unit is used immediately before treatment (and sometimes again during treatment) to ensure the patient's organs are in exactly the right position to match the treatment field, and to adjust the position of the treatment table if necessary.

The images may also be used to check for other requirements of some types of treatment, such as full or empty bladder, empty rectum, etc. The same cone beam source and detector can alternatively be used to take simple X-ray positioning images if the organ shows particularly well on X-ray or if Fiducial markers have been inserted into the organ.

=== Interventional radiology ===
The CBCT scanner is mounted on a C-arm fluoroscopy unit in the interventional radiology (IR) suite, which offers real time imaging with a stationary patient. This eliminates the time needed to transfer a patient from the angiography suite to a conventional computed tomography scanner and facilitates a broad spectrum of applications of CBCT during IR procedures. The clinical applications of CBCT in IR include treatment planning, device or implant positioning and assessment, intra-procedural localization, and assessment of procedure endpoints. CBCT is useful as a primary and supplemental form of imaging. It is an excellent adjunct to DSA and fluoroscopy for soft tissue and vascular visibility during complex procedures. The use of CBCT before fluoroscopy potentially reduces patient radiation exposure.

==== Clinical applications ====
- Chemoembolization for Hepatocellular Carcinoma: CBCT with contrast confirms that the proper artery is selected to deliver the therapy. The contrast enhances the parenchyma supplied by the selected artery and therefore reveals if the vasculature also supplies the tumor. Post-treatment non-contrast CBCT confirms lipiodol staining of the tumor, which improves operator confidence of complete tumor coverage or further treatment.
- Prostatic artery embolization for benign prostatic hyperplasia: CBCT provides the soft tissue detail needed to visualize prostatic enhancement, identify duplicated prostatic arteries, and avoid nontarget embolization. CBCT is superior to DSA for this therapy since the enhancement patterns on DSA can be difficult to discern due to the overlapping pelvic structures and variable arterial anatomy.
- Abscess drainage: CBCT confirms needle tip location after placement under ultrasound and confirms drain placement by revealing contrast injection into the desired location.
- Adrenal Vein sampling for an adenoma: contrast-enhanced CBCT shows perfusion of the adrenal gland to confirm catheter placement for obtaining a satisfactory sample.
- Stent placement: CBCT improves the visualization of intracranial and extracranial stents compared to conventional DSA and digital radiography by providing a better depiction of the relationship of the stents to nearby structures (i.e. vascular walls and aneurysm lumen).
- Lung nodule percutaneous transthoracic needle biopsy: CBCT guides needle placement and demonstrated a diagnostic accuracy, sensitivity, and specificity of 98.2%, 96.8%, and 100%, respectively. Diagnostic accuracy was unaffected by technically challenging conditions.
- Vascular Anomalies: After correction of arteriovenous malformations with coiling, CBCT sensitively detects small infarcts in tissue that has been "sacrificed" during the procedure to prevent further shunting. The infarcted tissue appears as a small area of contrast retention.
- Peripheral Vascular Interventions
- Biliary Interventions
- Spinal Interventions
- Enterostomy Interventions
- Intraoperative Angiography

=== Industrial applications ===
Cone beam CT is used for material analysis, metrology, and nondestructive testing in the manufacturing sector. Cone beam CT is also inspect and detect defects of tiny sizes, such as internal pitting corrosion or cracks of an object in quality control.

== Reconstruction ==
Cone beam reconstruction algorithms are similar to typical tomographic reconstruction algorithms, and methods such as filtered backprojection or iterative reconstruction may be used. However, since the reconstruction is three-dimensional, modifications such as the FDK algorithm may be needed.

== Risks ==
=== Oral and maxillofacial radiology ===
Total radiation doses from 3D dental CBCT exams are 96% lower than conventional CT exams, but deliver 5-16x more radiation than standard dental 2D x-ray (OPG). The time of exposure in CBCT is also comparatively less when compared to conventional CT.

CBCT use is only lightly regulated in the US. The recommended standard of care is to use the smallest possible field of view (FOV), the smallest voxel size, the lowest mA setting and the shortest exposure time in conjunction with a pulsed exposure mode of acquisition. International organisations such as the World Health Organization and ICRP, as well as many local bodies and legislation, encourage the idea of justification for all medical exposures, where risks and benefits must be weighed up before a procedure goes ahead.

== Disadvantages ==
=== Oral and maxillofacial radiology ===
There are a number of drawbacks of CBCT technology over that of CT scans, such as increased susceptibility to movement artifacts (in first generation machines) and to the lack of appropriate bone density determination.

==== Bone density and the Hounsfield scale ====
The Hounsfield scale is used to measure radiodensity and, in reference to CT scans, can provide an accurate absolute density for the type of tissue depicted. The radiodensity, measured in Hounsfield Units (HU, also known as CT number) is inaccurate in CBCT scans because different areas in the scan appear with different greyscale values depending on their relative positions in the organ being scanned, despite possessing identical densities, because the image value of a voxel of an organ depends on the position in the image volume. HU measured from the same anatomical area with both CBCT and medical-grade CT scanners are not identical and are thus unreliable for determination of site-specific, radiographically identified bone density for purposes such as the placement of dental implants, as there is "no good data to relate the CBCT HU values to bone quality."

Although some authors have supported the use of CBCT technology to evaluate bone density by measuring HU, such support is provided erroneously because scanned regions of the same density in the skull can have a different grayscale value in the reconstructed CBCT dataset.

X-ray attenuation of CBCT acquisition systems currently produces different HU values for similar bony and soft tissue structures in different areas of the scanned volume (e.g. dense bone has a specific image value at the level of the menton, but the same bone has a significantly different image value at the level of the cranial base).

Dental CBCT systems do not employ a standardized system for scaling the grey levels that represent the reconstructed density values and, as such, they are arbitrary and do not allow for assessment of bone quality. In the absence of such a standardization, it is difficult to interpret the grey levels or impossible to compare the values resulting from different machines. While there is a general acknowledgment that this deficiency exists with CBCT systems (in that they do not correctly display HU), there has been little research conducted to attempt to correct this deficiency.

With time, further advancements in CBCT reconstruction algorithms will allow for improved area detectors, and this, together with enhanced postprocessing, will likely solve or reduce this problem. A method for establishing attenuation coefficients with which actual HU values can be derived from CBCT "HU" values was published in 2010 and further research is currently underway to perfect this method in vivo.

=== Interventional radiology ===
While the practicality of CBCT fosters its increasing application in IR, technical limitations hinder its integration into the field. The two most significant factors that affect successful integration are image quality and time (for set up, image acquisition, and image reconstruction). Compared to multidetector computed tomography (MDCT), the wider collimation in CBCT leads to increased scatter radiation and degradation of image quality as demonstrated by artifacts and decreased contrast-to-noise ratio. The temporal resolution of cesium iodide detectors in CBCT slows data acquisition time to approximately 5 to 20 seconds, which increases motion artifacts. The time required for image reconstruction takes longer for CBCT (1 minute) compared to MDCT (real time) due to the computationally demanding cone beam reconstruction algorithms.

== See also ==
- Computed tomography
- Cone beam reconstruction
