= Hill Road =

Hill Road may refer to:

- Hill Road, Hong Kong, a road in Shek Tong Tsui, Hong Kong Island, Hong Kong
- Hill Road, Mumbai, an arterial road in Bandra (West), Mumbai, India

== See also ==
- Hills Road, Cambridge
- Accident on Hill Road, a 2009 Indian film
