= Totally endoscopic coronary artery bypass surgery =

Endoscopic robotic surgery used to treat coronary heart disease

- ICD-9-CM: 36.34

Totally endoscopic coronary artery bypass surgery (TECAB) is an entirely endoscopic robotic surgery used to treat coronary heart disease, developed in the late 1990s. It is an advanced form of minimally invasive direct coronary artery bypass surgery, which allows bypass surgery to be conducted off-pump without opening the ribcage. The technique involves three or four small holes in the chest cavity through which two robotic arms, and one camera are inserted.

== TECAB technology ==
TECAB surgery uses the da Vinci tele-robotic stereoscopic 3-D imaging system. The system consists of a robotic "slave" system at the bedside. The robot relays its information to an external surgical control unit, where a cardiac surgeon has a three-dimensional view of the chest cavity, and twin controllers for the robotic arms. The procedure frequently involves grafting of the internal mammary artery to the diseased coronary artery, and therefore does not require external harvesting of blood vessels.
