= Hill Road, Mumbai =

Road in Bandra (West), Mumbai, India

Coordinates: 19.0552°N 72.8302°E

Hill Road (officially renamed as Ramdas Nayak Road) is an arterial road in Bandra (West), Mumbai, India. It starts from the intersection of Bandra railway station road and Swami Vivekanand Road (SV Road) and goes west up to Mehboob Studio, leading to the Bandstand Promenade, the Bandra Fort, and Mount Mary Church, Bandra. Hill Road houses a number of old and new brands.the shops on hill road are closed on Friday.

The 165-year-old St. Stanislaus High School, and its adjoining St. Peter's church, St. Joseph's girls' school, the Apostolic Carmel convent school and St. Andrew's Church (Mumbai) all lie on Hill road. Two hospitals, Bhabha hospital and Holy Family Hospital also lie on Hill road. The Tata Parsi agiary built in 1873 is a prominent landmark on Hill road.

== See also ==
- Bandra
- Bhabha Hospital
