= Holy Family Hospital, Mumbai =

Holy Family Hospital
- The Bandra Holy Family Hospital Society
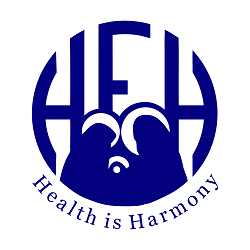

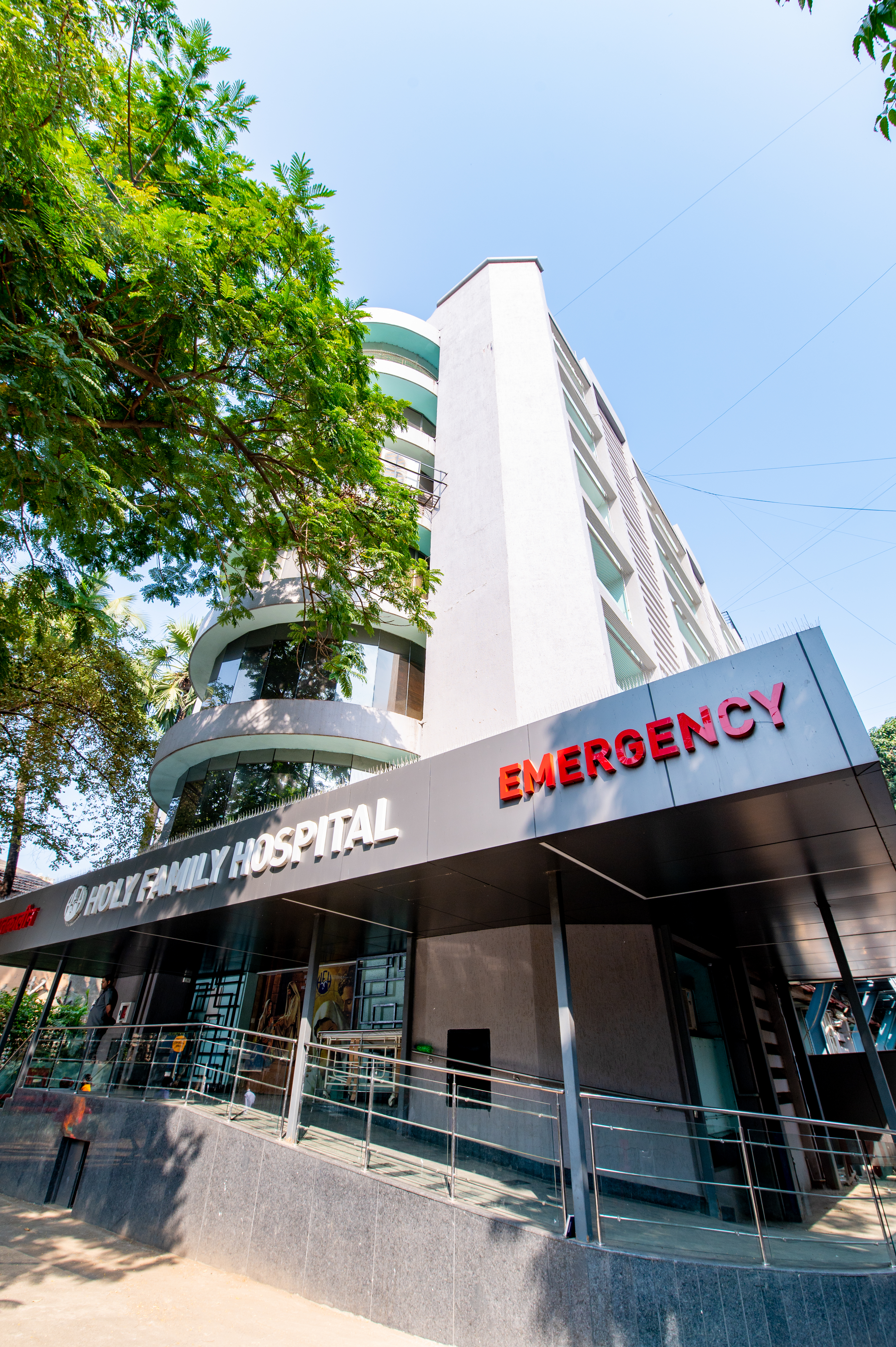

Geography
- Location: Bandra, Mumbai, Maharashtra, India

Organisation
- Care system: Private
- Type: General
- Religious affiliation: Roman Catholic
- Patron: Medical Mission Sisters

Services
- Standards: ISO 9001:2008; NABH 5th Edition; Maharashtra Medical Council
- Emergency department: Yes
- Beds: 268

History
- Founded: 1942

Links
- Website: holyfamilyhospital.in
- Lists: Hospitals in India

Holy Family Hospital is a roman catholic hospital founded by Medical Mission Sisters in 1942. It is located in Bandra, Mumbai on Hill Road. The hospital has 268 beds, and is administered by The Bandra Holy Family Hospital Society, a non-profit charitable trust.

Holy Family Hospital is Mumbai's first hospital with a hybrid cath lab and in October 2010, one of the three centres in India with such facilities.

== History ==
The hospital was established by Dr Austin Da Silva as Silverene, a private 10-bed nursing home. In 1953, it was expanded into a small general hospital with 22 beds and given its current name. The administration handed over to the Medical Mission Sisters. The Congregation of the Ursuline Sisters of Mary Immaculate took charge in 1978 and began raising funds for expanding the infrastructure. By 1985, the hospital had 120 beds. Infrastructure and medical technology were upgraded and the hospital building expanded to become the 268-bed institution it is today.

== Management Committee ==
The roles and responsibilities of the Management Committee Members include the development of the facility and the oversight of patient care.

The current Management committee includes:

- Dr. Sr. Beena – Executive Director
- Sr. Sheeja – Asst. Executive Director
- Dr. Rajeev Boudhankar – Medical Director
- Dr. Rajeshree Jadhav – Medical Superintendent
- Mr. Felix Fernandes – Finance Director
- Dr. Yash Lokhandwala – Director (Research & Academic Studies)
- Sr. Sheela – Nursing Director
- Sr. Silji – Accounts In-charge
- Sr.Jessy – Chief Pharmacist
- Sr. Soniya – HR Manager
- Sr. Gaudenzia – Pastoral Care
- Mr. Pradeep D’Souza – Finance Manager
- Dr. Armida Fernandez – Member
