= Minimally invasive direct coronary artery bypass surgery =

Surgical treatment for coronary heart disease

- ICD-9-CM: 36.33

Minimally invasive direct coronary artery bypass (MIDCAB) is a surgical treatment for coronary heart disease that is a less invasive method of coronary artery bypass surgery (CABG). MIDCAB gains surgical access to the heart with a smaller incision than other types of CABG. MIDCAB is sometimes referred to as "keyhole" heart surgery because the operation is analogous to operating through a keyhole.

MIDCAB is a form of off-pump coronary artery bypass surgery (OPCAB), performed "off-pump" – without the use of cardiopulmonary bypass (the heart-lung machine). MIDCAB differs from OPCAB in the type of incision used for the surgery; with traditional CABG and OPCAB a median sternotomy (dividing the breastbone) provides access to the heart; with MIDCAB, the surgeon enters the chest cavity through a mini-thoracotomy (a 2-to-3 inch incision between the ribs).

MIDCAB surgery is no longer reserved for only anteriorly placed single- or double-vessel diseases, because such lesions are usually managed with angioplasty. The surgery has recently begun to be used in multi-vessel coronary disease.

== MIDCAB in hybrid revascularization ==
People with multi-vessel coronary disease, who desire a minimally invasive approach to surgery may be eligible for hybrid bypass. A hybrid approach combines coronary bypass (using the MIDCAB approach) and coronary stenting.

== See also ==
- Cardiac surgeon
- Cardiac surgery
- Totally endoscopic coronary artery bypass surgery
