= K B Bhabha Hospital =

Hospital in Mumbai, India

K. B. Bhabha Municipal General Hospital
- Brihanmumbai Municipal Corporation (BMC)

Geography
- Location: Bandra (West), Mumbai, Maharashtra, India

Organisation
- Care system: Public
- Type: General

Services
- Emergency department: Yes
- Beds: 436

History
- Opened: 1914

Links
- Lists: Hospitals in India

Khurshitji Beharamji Bhabha Municipal General Hospital, commonly known as K. B. Bhabha Hospital or Bhabha Hospital, is a public general hospital in Bandra (West), Mumbai... K. B. Bhabha Municipal General Hospital, commonly known as Bhabha Hospital, is a public general hospital in Bandra (West), Mumbai, Maharashtra, India. It is operated by the Brihanmumbai Municipal Corporation (BMC). Established in 1914 and expanded over time, the hospital today has 436 beds and provides emergency and general specialty services to residents of Bandra and adjoining suburbs.

== History ==
The hospital was named after Khurshitji Beharamji Bhabha following a land donation by his family to the Bandra municipality, becoming known as Khurshitji Beharamji Bhabha Municipal General Hospital—often abbreviated as K. B. Bhabha Hospital.

K. B. Bhabha Hospital was taken over by the Municipal Corporation of Greater Mumbai (MCGM) in 1950 with 44 beds. A paediatric ward was added in 1962, and the hospital expanded to 165 beds by 1967. A ten-storey tower building was completed in 1987, raising its capacity to 436 beds.

== Facilities ==
The hospital provides general and specialty care including medicine, surgery, paediatrics, obstetrics and gynaecology, orthopaedics, dermatology, psychiatry, ENT, ophthalmology, and dentistry. Emergency services include 24/7 casualty, ambulance, mortuary, operating theatres, pharmacy, and blood bank. Diagnostic facilities comprise radiology (X-ray, ultrasonography), pathology laboratory, ECG, and CT scan. Maternal and child health services include antenatal and postnatal care, immunisation, and family planning programmes.

== Recent Expansion ==
In January 2025, the hospital opened outpatient departments in a new 11-storey tower adjacent to the existing building. The new block is planned to host super-speciality departments such as nephrology and cardiothoracic surgery.

== Operational Challenges ==
Despite expansion, the hospital faces staffing and infrastructure shortages. In 2023 the State Human Rights Commission noted that its blood bank did not operate round-the-clock, requiring relatives to source blood externally during emergencies.
