= Mini C-arm =

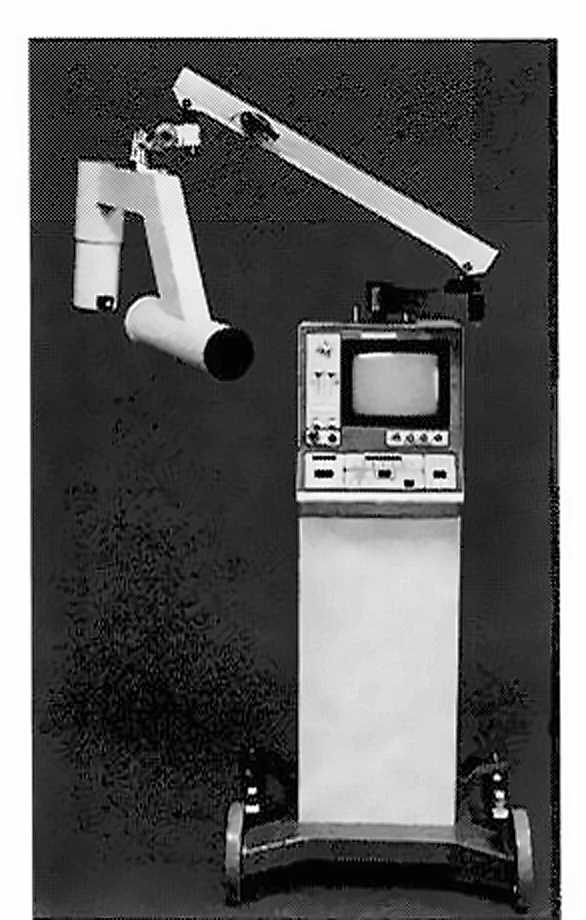
FluoroScan Mini C-arm (HealthMate, Inc., 1986)

Mini C-arm (also called miniature C-arm, mobile C-arm or extremity fluoroscope) is a compact, portable fluoroscopic X-ray imaging system designed for real-time imaging of the small bones and joints of the extremities. It takes its name from the C-shaped arm connecting the X-ray source on one end to the image detector on the other.

The mini C-arm was first released in 1985. It is used in orthopedics, emergency rooms and pediatric imaging.

Before its introduction, the only available fluoroscopy systems were full-size stationary C-arms designed for spinal and large-joint surgery, which are relatively expensive.

== Clinical applications ==
The mini C-arm is standard equipment in hospitals, surgery centers, and physician offices.

=== Hand and wrist surgery ===
The Mini C-arm introduced portable intraoperative fluoroscopic guidance to hand and wrist surgery, including. percutaneous fixation. The device also enabled wider clinical use of fluoroscopic wrist motion assessment for carpal instability, which is a dynamic condition not visible on static X-rays. Wolf and Weiss reported improved operative efficiency in hand surgery, and a 2022 prospective study reported a 24 minute reduction per postoperative visit and cost savings exceeding $9,500 per patient series.

=== Foot and ankle surgery ===
Documentation of the Mini C-arm in foot and ankle surgery has dated since 1993. Key applications of the Mini C-arm include minimally invasive hallux valgus correction, including the MICA (Minimally Invasive Chevron-Akin) technique, as well as percutaneous lag screw fixation of ankle fractures and fluoroscopy-guided K-wire fixation of forefoot deformities.

=== Pediatric orthopedic surgery ===
The Mini C-arm's lower dose profile is particularly relevant in pediatrics. It is used for closed reduction and percutaneous pinning of supracondylar humerus fractures. Fanelli et al. (Journal of Pediatric Orthopaedics, 2016) demonstrated a 23-minute reduction in patient waiting time per visit and improved clinical efficiency.

=== Emergency medicine ===
Emergency departments adopted Mini C-arms for closed reduction of distal radius fractures, foreign body localization, and joint aspiration. Lee et al. (JBJS, 2011) established in 279 pediatric forearm fractures that Mini C-arm guidance improved reduction quality, decreased radiation exposure, and reduced the need for repeat reductions. During the COVID-19 pandemic, Mini C-arm fluoroscopy enabled UK hand clinics to maintain continuity of care while avoiding patient transfers to imaging departments.

== Design and technical characteristics ==
A Mini C-arm consists of the following principal components. Its architecture differs from full-size fluoroscopy C-arms in that it is built with a smaller physical arc, lower power generator capacity, and lighter construction, optimized for extremity imaging of hands, wrists, feet, and ankles.

- C-arm assembly: A C-shaped arm with the X-ray tube at one end and the image detector at the other. The arm rotates around the patient's extremity, typically 120°-150°, enabling anteroposterior, lateral, and oblique views without repositioning the patient. The C-frame design allows the device to rotate through vertical, inverted, and horizontal configurations, reducing scatter radiation patterns around the operating table during live procedures.
- X-ray source (tube head): A micro-focus X-ray tube operating at low tube current and a source-to-detector distance of approximately 40 cm, producing significantly less scattered radiation.
- Image detector: Early systems used a small image intensifier, typically 4-6.7 cm diameter. The evolution from vacuum-tube image intensifiers to flat-panel detectors (FPDs) represents an important engineering advancement: FPD systems offer a smaller, more compact mechanical frame, extended dynamic range, and elimination of the spatial (geometric) distortion inherent to the curved input screen of a vacuum-tube intensifier.
- Dynamic fluoroscopy capability: The system processes both static radiographs and real-time dynamic imaging, allowing the clinician to capture moving physiological actions such as joint flexion intraoperatively.
- Monitor and processing unit: A mounted display (typically 20-24 inches) showing real-time fluoroscopic images. Digital capabilities include image capture, cine loops, zoom, contrast adjustment, and DICOM export.
- Mobile cart: A wheeled cart housing electronics, monitor arm, and C-arm mounting. Current system weights range from approximately 30-100 pounds (14-45 kg), enabling room-to-room mobility.
- Foot pedal and surgeon-operated controls: The surgeon activates X-ray exposure via a floor-mounted foot pedal. The control systems and lightweight construction are designed to be surgeon operated.

== Radiation safety ==
The Mini C-arm produces less scatter radiation than standard fluoroscopic C-arms, primarily due to its shorter source-to-detector distance and lower tube current. Key peer-reviewed findings:

- Athwal et al. (2005, Journal of Hand Surgery) demonstrated universally lower radiation exposure across all hand surgery configurations. Singer (2005, Journal of Hand Surgery) provided quantified measurement of radiation exposure specifically to the surgeon's hands, establishing the safety basis for routine clinical use.
- Dawe et al. (2011, Foot and Ankle Surgery) documented 53% lower radiation dose area product in foot and ankle surgery.
- FESSH (2016, J. Hand Surgery European Volume) reported surgeons receive less than 3% of annual radiation limits during intraoperative hand and wrist fluoroscopy.
- A prospective series of 1,064 consecutive foot and ankle procedures confirmed all radiation exposures remained below international occupational and patient dose limits throughout daily clinical use.
- Standard radiation protection practices apply, including lead aprons, thyroid shields, leaded gloves, and the ALARA principle (As Low As Reasonably Achievable).

== Origin ==
The Mini C-arm was invented by American entrepreneur Larry S. Grossman. He founded HealthMate, Inc. in 1982 to adapt NASA-derived low-intensity X-ray imaging (LIXI) technology into a mains-powered fluoroscopic instrument for medical use.

The mini C-arm was derived from the Lixiscope, another portable X-ray imaging device. Grossman devised the concept of replacing the radioactive isotope used in the Lixiscope with a micro-focused X-ray tube and adding a high-voltage power supply to that device to make it controllable.

== History ==
HealthMate introduced the FluoroScan Mini C-arm in the United States in 1985. Following a Chapter 11 reorganization in 1989, HealthMate was renamed FluoroScan Imaging Systems, Inc.

A second early mini C-arm system, the XiTec XiScan, also became available in the early 1990s. The XiScan technology has since been continued by FM Control of Vitoria-Gasteiz, Spain, whose XiScan Series 5000 is a European-manufactured mini C-arm available in European and international markets.

FluoroScan Imaging Systems, Inc. was acquired by Hologic, Inc. (NASDAQ: HOLX), in 1996. Under Hologic, the product line was rebranded as the Fluoroscan Insight. Successive generations include the Premier, Premier Encore, InSight, InSight 2, and InSight FD. Hologic announced the end-of-sale and end-of-life for the Fluoroscan InSight FD mini C-arm, effective September 30, 2025.

In 2004, OrthoScan, Inc. was established. OrthoScan introduced the OrthoScan FD with a flat-panel detector, offering 2K x 1.5K matrix resolution versus the 1K x 1K standard of image intensifier systems. OrthoScan subsequently introduced the FD Pulse, which included a pulsed fluoroscopy option. In September 2011, OrthoScan was acquired by German private investment firm Aton GmbH, which also held a majority stake in Ziehm Imaging. Aton later merged the two C-arm companies and renamed the combined entity Ziehm-OrthoScan. They subsequently produced the TAU Mini C-arm brand.

OEC Medical Systems, Inc. (Salt Lake City, Utah) entered the Mini C-arm market with its Mini 6600 and MiniView 6800 models. OEC was acquired by GE Medical Systems in November 1999 and the product line continued under the GE OEC brand.

== Regulatory status ==
In the United States, Mini C-arms may be operated by licensed physicians, subject to state radiation control regulations. This physician operable status makes the Mini C-arm distinct from standard C-arms, which typically require a radiographer.

== See also ==
- Fluoroscopy
- Image intensifier
- Image-guided surgery
