= Villages in Bandra, Mumbai =

Villages in Bandra, Mumbai are in the Western Suburbs of Mumbai, part of what has been called the Queen of Suburbs of Mumbai (once known as Bombay). Home to a number of personalities from the film industry as well as cricket, it is one of the most affluent suburbs of Mumbai. The old villages of Bandra are hidden behind the tall buildings and shopping malls of the area. The old villages pakhadis of Bandra, originally twenty-four of them, were one of the earliest of settlements in Bandra.

== List of villages (hamlets) and their occupation ==
=== Portuguese period ===
The following were the hamlets pakhadis during Portuguese period, which ended approximately around year 1739, mentioned along with each is the occupation of these villages, and their designated area of influence:

- Chuem (Chuim)- cultivators,
- Candely - cultivators - this settlement was near Chuim but got extinct after 1732.
- Xelalim (Sherly)- cultivators - Port. Sellaly,
- Rajana (Rajan)- cultivators - Port. Rajana,
- Mallan (Malla)- cultivators - Port. Mallem,
- Dandem Khar Danda,
- Parvar - cultivators - this settlement was located between (Dr.Ambedkar Road and Khar Gymkhana - current road names) but got extinct after 1853,
- Pall (Pali)- cultivators - Port. Pallem,
- Kantavari (Old Kantwadi) - cultivators - Port. Horta de Santo Andre - N.B. New Kantwadi was a similar hamlet of cultivators that came into existence in 1817,
- Ranuar (Ranwar) - cultivators - Port. Ranoar,
- Tank - cultivators - Port. Tanque,
- Dancavar (Boran) - cultivators - Port. Dandacarvar,
- Patarvar - cultivators - location of this hamlet (north of St. Joseph Convent - current name of a school) - extinct after 1817,
- Varoda (Waroda),
- Khar - Bois and "cavoqueiros" - Port. Salgado,
- Santa Cruz - toddy-tappers and cultivators,
- Catirvara - Bois - near Khar,
- Povoacao - Extending to the D'Monte Street, the Portuguese and their household staff lived in this area.

The following are some localities that existed near Povoacao

- Rua Baixa (Lower Street),
- Bazar- location (Bandra Bazar - current name)- this area had mixed population,
- Rua do Bazar - (Bazar Street) - miscellaneous population,
- Horta do Bazar (Bazar Oart) - Faras - scavengers - located near (Chinchpokli Road - current road name),
- Rua dos Tintoreiros (Dyers Street)- miscellaneous population - this hamlet was located most probably near the Bazar.

Parish of Santa Anna had all the above-mentioned hamlets, Povoacao, and the other localities under it. The rough area under Santa Anna parish was ( Swami Vivekanand Road (current name)- extending to railway lines till the Old Slaughterhouse). The potters, weavers, mainatos (washermen), toddy-tappers, and other non Koli groups or castes which did not belong to any hamlets were also under Santa Anna parish.

=== Pertained by St. Andrew's parish ===
There were certain Hamlets that were under St Andrew's parish. Most of them were Kolis fishermen settlements and they were called koliwadas. A few of them were as follows:

- Colario de Igrezia (Chimbai),
- Colaria Naopara - Located near Old Ghodbunder Road (Current name of the Road),
- Colaria de Meio - located near Bazar area,
- Colaria Mora - located near Bandra Bunder,
- Colaria Grande - located near Chapel Road (Current name of the Road),
- Colaria Zaitucali - north of Mount Carmel church (Current name of the Church),
- Colai - located near Seaside Cemetery,
- Supali - located near Supali Talao ground.

These Koliwadas were under Santa Anna parish and there is mention of them in the baptismal register of Santa Anna since people in these hamlets were baptised over several years by the parish.

== History ==
Only a few of them have survived the time, a few of them are on verge of extinction, and some of them are listed under heritage. Records suggest these villages date back 1534, were ruled by Bahadur Shah of Gujrat. Bandra area originally had 25 "pakhadis" villages. These villages were either fishing or farming villages. The original inhabitants of these "pakhadis" were mainly the Bombay East Indians and Hindu Kolis. The old Bandra was scenic, with stretches of green, bungalows, clusters of villages, villas surrounded by little gardens, and coastline. Home doors were kept open as a welcoming gesture and all the inhabitants were acquainted with everyone. From 1896 to 1906 Mumbai was struck by plague (Bombay plague epidemic) and the residents in Bandra villages suffered. Some were vacated.

=== Agriculture and other trades ===
Bandra was a part of the island called Salsette which was referred to as a granary. In Bandra, there were extensive paddy fields, coconut 'oarts', and vegetable gardens. Mango groves existed on the hilly areas. Other areas had barb trees. The main crop grown in Bandra was Rice (Gazetteer, Vol XIII, Pt. 2, pg. 478) Portuguese forbade the export of rice when there was a conflict between them and British.

Dr. John Fryer (British traveller and /writer), who visited the Selsette island in 1673-75, described Bandra to be an excellently fertile land naturally or either because of the care of inhabitants. He also documented that there were good yields of Cabbages, Radishes, Coleworts, Water-Melons and Onions. He also mentions that the Selsette island, with all this crop, was not only supplying these yields to the nearby islands but also to Goa.

== Ranwar Village ==
Ranwar is approximately 400 year old East Indian Catholic village one of the original twenty four hamlets pakhadis. It is a heritage listed precinct in Mumbai. It was a rice producing village and was surrounded by paddy fields. The exact extent (boundaries) of this hamlet have blurred over the period of time due to new developments in the area. Ranwar roughly Stretches from Waroda Road (a narrow lane off Hill road) towards Bandra Reclamation.

Current condition: The architecture of the Portuguese times has now taken a more urban form where all the welcoming porches are walled off, the big windows that once were open are caged by grills. The demographics in Ranwar has changed due to increase in population, which has shattered the fabric of community life. The village infrastructure is not able to cope up with the increasing residents. The narrow lanes get blocked by traffic, sewage lines laid in the 1920s are overburdened due to increase in sewage. The original residents of the houses are leaving and the demographic of this urban village is rapidly changing. These old houses are experiencing structural issues, with walls buckling extra materials and reinforcements are being added for support. The open areas of the houses that were sunlit once, are now overshadowed by high-rises around. Conservationists are doing their best to maintain the character of the Ranwar.

Due to these numerous problems, maintaining the old houses is becoming a difficult task. Hence out of 42 bungalows in Ranwar 6 of the bungalows are demolished. Ranwar is one of the prime locations in Mumbai and the prices of the real estate are growing year after year hence a lot of developers are pursuing these old house owners to sell their property for making prime real estate.

== Chimbai Village ==
The Chimbai Village is home to the fishing community called the Kolis. Unlike Ranwar, which is famous for its artsy image, Chimbai still remains as a simple fishing village without much of development. Chimbai is located near bandstand which is really popular among youngsters.

The village is not currently well-maintained. The community that lives here call themselves Chimbaikars. Unlike Ranwar, the younger generations of the same families still reside in Chimbai. After the 2008 terrorist attacks in Mumbai, where it was said that the terrorists used waterways to get into the city, the rules for these fishermen have been made strict and possessing photo identity cards is made mandatory. Chimbaikars have continued the tradition of community bonding in the form of badminton at nights regularly. The main fishing activity that is done by Chimbaikars happens at night time and usually is a nighttime activity that does not cause significant disturbance to the nearby residents. The community has built up shacks for the children to play, as a community gathering space for the elderly. This encourages all the families to communicate and bond since the men fishing can be out for days, this acts as a support system for the females and the children in the families.

== Chuim Village ==
The Chuim Village was a small cluster of 70 houses- recorded in the 1940s. Chuim stretches, a few houses, to the east and the west around with Dr. Br. Ambedkar Road approximately running through the centre. This village as compared to the other settlements was a bit small and over the years now only around 20 odd houses remain and others have been developed into small buildings. As the other hamlets Chuim also traded agricultural produce and flowers. Primary schooling in the old days was done within the settlement in the midst of mango trees. Chuim used to be alive from the fishing activity that used to happen along with Danda village, the on the spot sale and bargain used to add to this liveliness.

Architecture: Chuim has two-storey cottage structures. It has a unique character as compared to other developments around with wooden framed structures, circular staircases, attics, and iron grilled windows. Almost every house has a Varandah where the elderly sit every day. Narrow lanes, as same, in the other villages are used as social gathering spaces.

Current condition: As the other villages Chuim is also facing an array of infrastructure problems ranging from water supply pressure being very low to sewage overload which has resulted in the sale of property for fresh development or redevelopment. Since the village is centrally located, with railway station, schools, colleges, religious places, and leisure promenades the area is said to be a prime location for development. There are a few Buddhists that live in Chuim that have reported being stressed to repair their houses after every few years.

== Pali Village ==
Pali Village sometimes also referred as (Pali Goathan) is a small urban village in the Bandra suburb of Mumbai, India (formerly Bombay). Established in 1700s, it has lend its name to localities like Pali Hill and Pali Naka, Today, it is developing as a destination for heath spas and holistic healing centres, as well as chic restaurants.

Overview: It is a mixed-zone neighborhood of Bandra and lies 650 meters from the coastline. The nearest coastline is the Carter Road edge of the Arabian Sea. Pali Village's Area Locality Management is known as PVRCF, or the Pali Village Residents Civic Forum, whose membership includes all residents of the Village. PVRCF's current Gen. Secretary is Asif Farooqui

Pali Village was settled around 1700 by the British Colonial Rulers

It is close to Pali Hill and Linking Road and its residents are mainly Catholics and Muslims.

== Architecture and Planning ==
Most of the pakhadis in Mumbai had a heavy Portuguese architectural influence in housing and general building style. Chuim, Ranwar, Shirley Rajan, Pali, etc. shared the same architectural style. The narrow zigzag alleyways were developed for shading in the common areas and they also served as protection from bandits that raided the lands sometimes. Village squares served as community gathering spaces. The original architectural style dates back approximately 140 years where the basic design of a house was a single storey structure with attic space to store grain, since the original residents were paddy owners. Most of the houses had either front or back open spaces for interactions or as kids playing area. The roofs were tiled with Mangalore tiles. The roofs featured Balcao style sit outs. The trellises were ornamented and the structural system was wooden. Open spaces at the back of the houses was sometimes used as rosaries or to make masalas. All the spaces were designed at a pedestrian scale. The hamlets developed as close knit community because of well-designed social interaction spaces.

== Religious places in and near the villages ==
- St. Andrew's Church, Mumbai This is one of the oldest churches in Mumbai. Almost all the hamlets came under its parish.
- Mount Mary Church, Bandra
- St. Stephen’s Church, Ranwar Village, Chapel Road, Bandra (W), Mumbai.
- St. Anne Church, Pali Hill, Bandra (W), Mumbai.
- St Vincent De Paul Church, Dr BR Ambedkar Rd, Bandra (W), Mumbai.
- Mount Carmel Church, 81A, Chapel Road, Bandra (W), Mumbai.
- Inri Church, Regal Apartment Ground 19, Chapel Rd, Ranwar, Bandra (W), Mumbai.

== Recreation and leisure ==
- Bandra Reclamation, Bandra, Mumbai, Maharashtra, India.
- Bandstand Promenade
- Carter Road Promenade
- Bandra Talao
- Supari Talao, Playground, Mount Carmel Road, Bandra (W), Mumbai, Maharashtra, India.
- Khar Gymkhana, 13th Road, Khar (W), Mumbai, Maharashtra, India.

== Culture ==
=== Urban art ===
The old villages have now tuned into exhibition galleries for the voices of the people. These small narrow lanes of the villages display works of urban art.

=== Festivals ===
There are a number of festivals that are celebrated and one of them is Celebrate Bandra which has number of cultural activities that are planned over a period of 20 days to a month.

== In literature ==
Many of the characters in the book Bloodline Bandra by Godfrey Joseph Pereira (2014), are East Indian, including the protagonist, journalist, David Cabral from Pali in Bandra. The book itself is set in the 1950's with the first half of the book having most of the action in Pali Village, a predominantly East Indian populace at the time.

== Notes ==
Documentation of the Chuim: The documentation of Chuim in detail is done and this source will provide you with a detailed report.Transforming Habitats: - Case Study of Mumbai, Done by: Madhura Yadav and Gaurang Desai - Marathwada Institute of Technology, Retrieved 24 September 2016

=== Urban art ===
Pictures and more information

- COLOURS OF BANDRA: STREET ART IN MUMBAI Posted on: 1 February 2014, Accessed: 29 September 2016
- Bandra’s street art: A fantasy world at Chapel Road, Posted on: 18 April 2014, Accessed: 29 September 2016,
- Graffiti in Mumbai: Ten Works of Art that Make the Streets Come Alive, Accessed: 29 September 2016
- More street art from Bandra Posted on: 11 March 2015, Accessed: 29 September 2016

=== Festivals ===
Pictures and more information

- Celebrate Bandra, Accessed: Sept 29,2016
- Bandra Fair on the other hand is one of the festivals celebrated by the Mount Mary Church, Bandra.
