= Kherwadi =

- Neighbourhood
- Location within Mumbai
- Coordinates: 19.0553°N 72.8314°E
- Country: India
- State: Maharashtra
- District: Mumbai Suburban
- City: Mumbai

Government
  - Type: Municipal Corporation
  - Body: Brihanmumbai Municipal Corporation (MCGM)

Population
  - Total: 160,000

Languages
  - Official: Marathi
- Time zone: UTC+5:30 (IST)
- PIN: 400051
- Telephone code: 022
- Vehicle registration: MH-02

Kherwadi is a middle class, developing neighborhood, situated on the eastern side of Bandra railway station, Mumbai. Its name is derived from the first chief minister of Bombay State, B. G. Kher. It is surrounded by the CBD of BKC to the east, Mahim to the south, Khar to the north, and S.V. Road to the west. It is well connected to all parts of Mumbai, Navi Mumbai, and Thane. The Western Expressway passes through Kherwadi junction, a signal intersection situated in Kherwadi.

== History ==
The neighborhood was first developed by MHADA, with 35 buildings, with each building having 56 flats, with each flat being a 1 Room Kitchen. Primarily, the buildings had a typical C-shaped chawl-type look, with a ground in the center of each building making it a very good residential prospect for middle-class families with children. Most of the buildings had chosen to carry out self-development wherein the building raised funds from its members and constructed 1 additional room for each Flat thus making the Flats 1 Bedroom Hall and Kitchen. Presently however, the buildings are being redeveloped into high-rises by private builders which started around the year 2005-06 with Building No. 14 being re-developed into the first tower in the locality. The redevelopments brought good fortunes for the residents, as they started getting a good sum of money in addition to increased spaces in return. Few of the projects are however, stuck in limbo due to builders or bureaucratic reasons. Kherwadi also consists of the affluent upper-middle-class neighborhood of New MIG Colony consisting of 14 Buildings, Having a 2 BHK flat system. The Naupada or Behrampada slums are situated behind the New MIG Colony and cluster of shops and independent houses in Amrut Nagar. The area of Kherwadi was one of the most affected during the Mumbai Floods of 2005 when all houses on the ground floor were partly submerged underwater, forcing the residents to abandon and move to higher floors. The nearest airport is the Chatrapati Shivaji International Airport, situated at 8 kilometers from the neighborhood.

== Amenities ==
Kherwadi has a large public playground named Chhatrapati Shivaji Maharaj Udyan, also popularly known as "Colgate Maidan" by locals. It has a large market area where one can find shops of all kinds.

There is a public school managed by the BMC for standards from 1 to 10th, a private school managed by Janata Education Society Purushottam High School, and there are colleges for higher education such as Kaiser Jr College and Raheja College of Architecture. The locality also celebrates the annual Sarvajanik Ganesh Chaturthi, which has been celebrated for more than 50 years. Along with the aforementioned Ganesh Temple, the locality also has a Sai Baba Temple and a Ram Mandir at its boundary with neighboring Daulat Nagar.

== See also ==
- Kalanagar
- Bandra Talao
- Mahim
- Khar Road
- Bhabha hospital
- Pali Naka
