= Francis Dias =

Indian Army general (1934–2019)

Lieutenant-General Francis Tiburtius Dias PVSM, AVSM, VrC
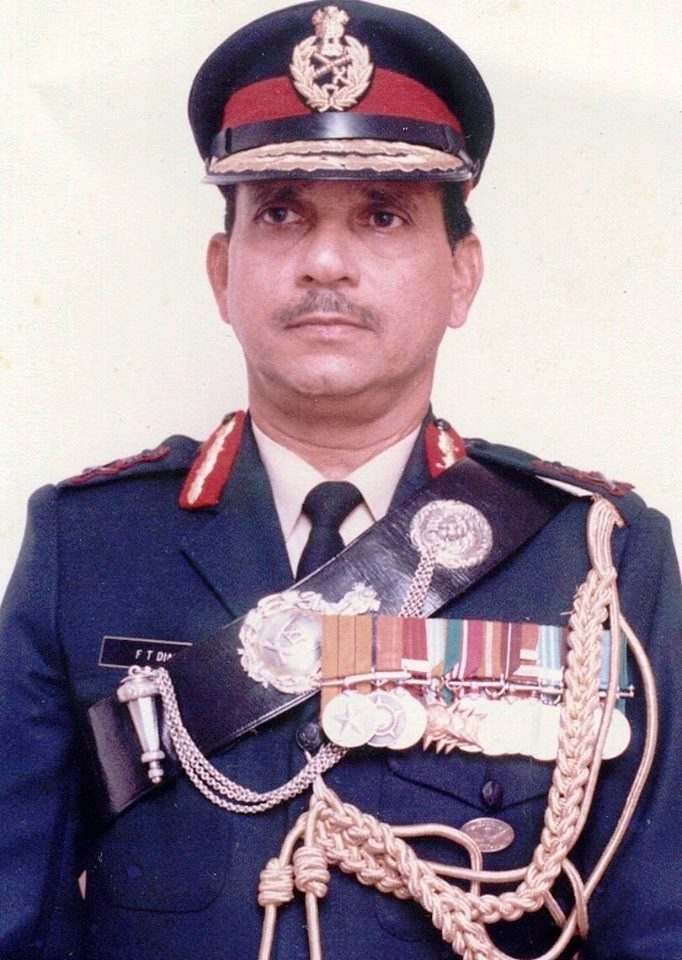
- Born: 4 October 1934; Poona, Maharashtra
- Died: 26 January 2019 (aged 84); Pali Hill, Bandra, Mumbai
- Burial place: Church of Our Lady of Mount Carmel, Bandra, Mumbai; 19°3′0″N 72°49′41″E
- Spouse: Selda Dias
- Relatives: His Eminence Ivan Dias Dr Olaf J Dias, Mr Ralph J Dias
- Military career
- Allegiance: India
- Branch: Indian Army
- Service years: 1954–1992
- Rank: Lieutenant-General
- Nickname: Dick Dias
- Service number: IC-7044
- Unit: 11th Gorkha Rifles
- Commands: Chief of Staff Southern Command
- Conflicts: Indo-Pakistani War of 1965; Indo-Pakistani War of 1971; Operation Cactus-Lilly
- Awards: Param Vishisht Seva Medal; Ati Vishisht Seva Medal; Vir Chakra

Lieutenant-General Francis Tiburtius Dias, PVSM, AVSM, VrC (14 October 1934 – 16 January 2019) was an Indian Army officer, who was involved in the Indo-Pakistani War of 1971.

== Early days ==
Dias was born in 1934 into a Goan family having Portuguese ancestry. He is the elder brother of Cardinal Ivan Dias.

== Military career ==
Francis T. Dias joined the Gorkha Regiment in 1954 as a second lieutenant.

== Vir Chakra ==
The citation for the Vir Chakra awarded to him reads:

CITATION
(Lieutenant Colonel Francis Tiburtius Dias)
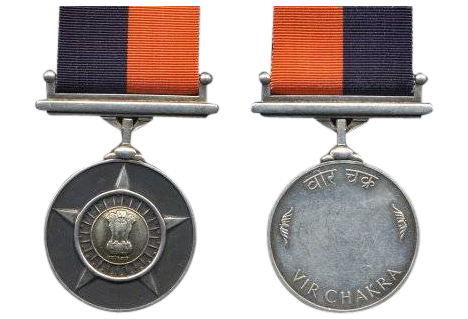

Lieutenant Colonel Francis Tiburtius Dias was commanding a battalion of 11th Gorkha Rifles during the operations against Pakistan in the Eastern Sector. On 12 December 1971, he was ordered to capture a well prepared position held by an enemy infantry battalion. Again, on 13 December, the battalion was assigned the task of capturing two bridges held by the enemy in strength. And finally on 14 December 1971 the battalion was assigned the task of capturing a portion of Bogra Town. Under his leadership, the battalion carried out all the tasks successfully, inflicting heavy casualties on the enemy. After contacting the enemy defences at Mahasthana, he infiltrated between the enemy's forward defended localities, raided the enemy battalion headquarters, and captured the officer commanding along with other officers. He also thwarted enemy efforts to blow up bridges. It was due to him that the battalion contributed to a great extent in clearing Bogra Town and taking a large number of prisoners.

Throughout the operation, Lieutenant Colonel military record for this time included an official commendation for professional skill and gallantry.
