= Bandra =

Suburb of Mumbai, India

Bandra Vandre
- Suburb
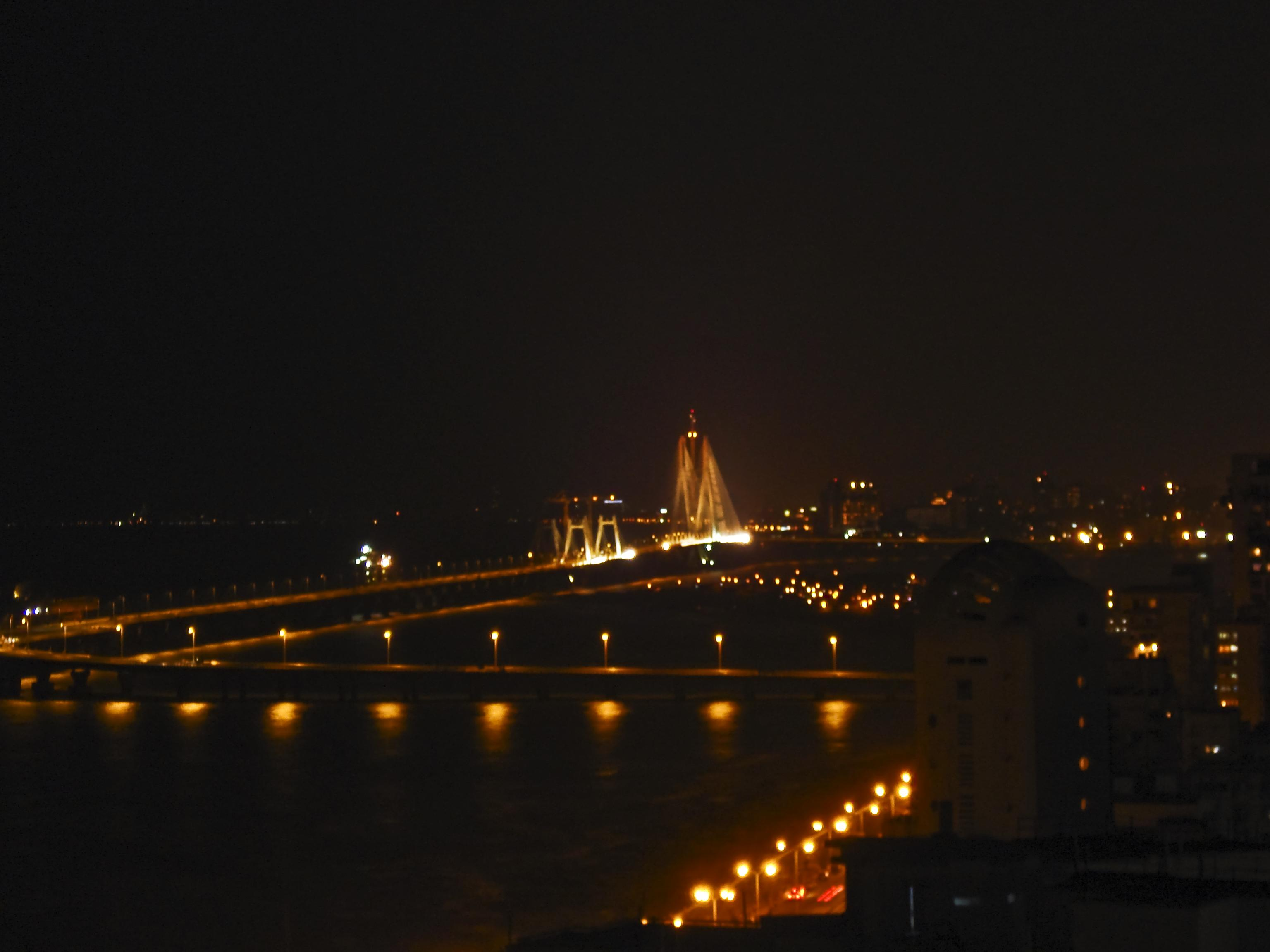
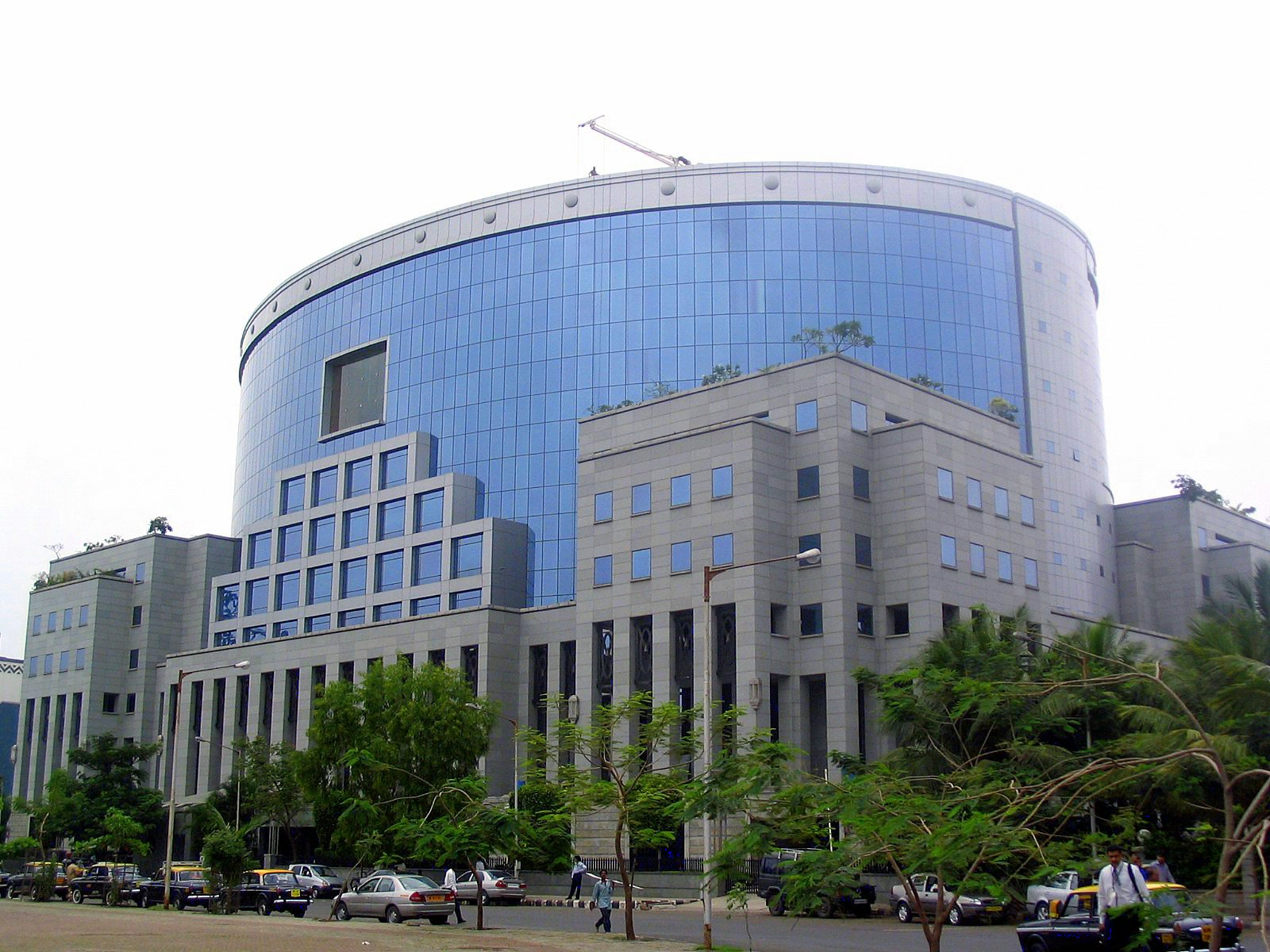
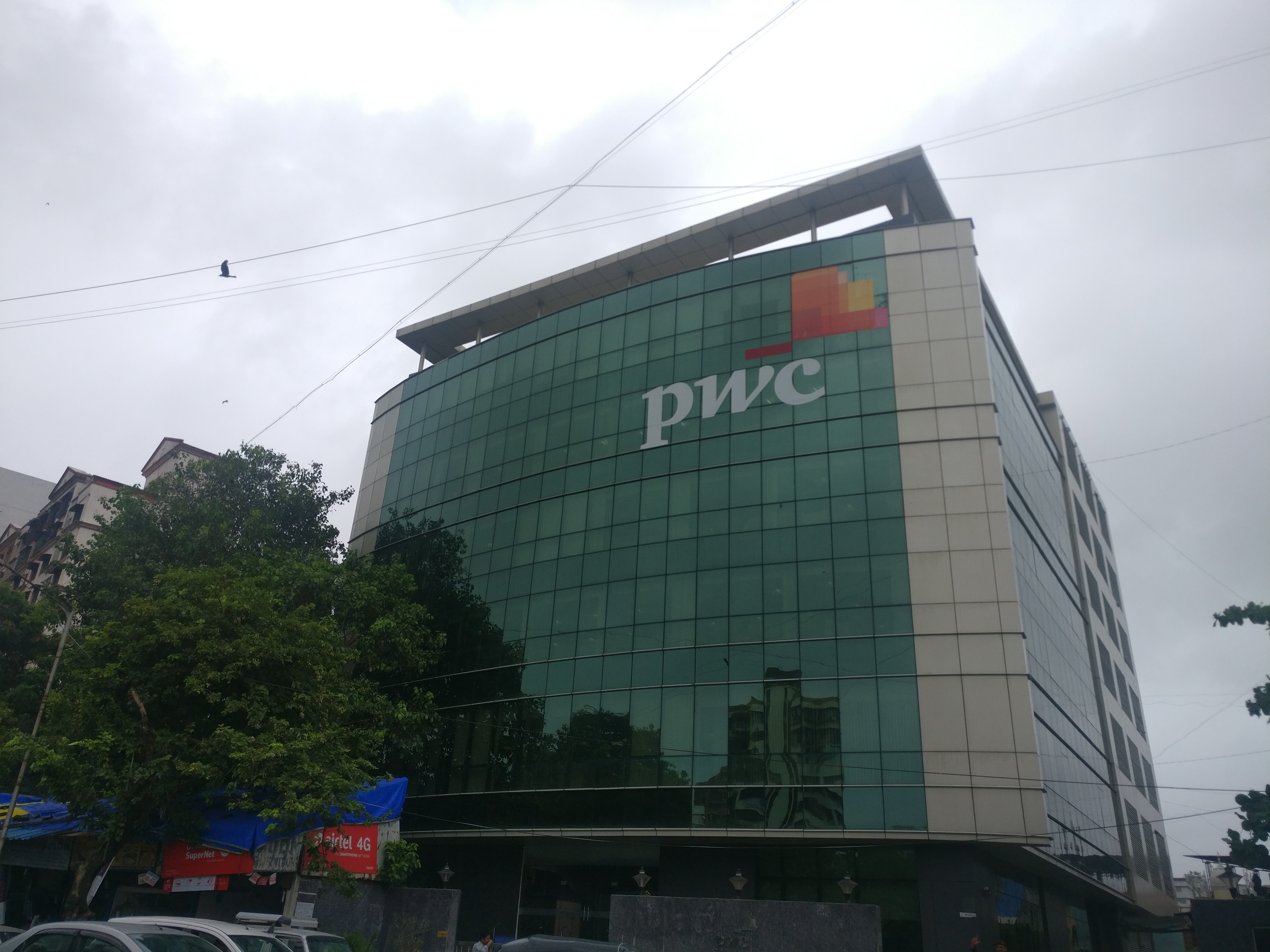
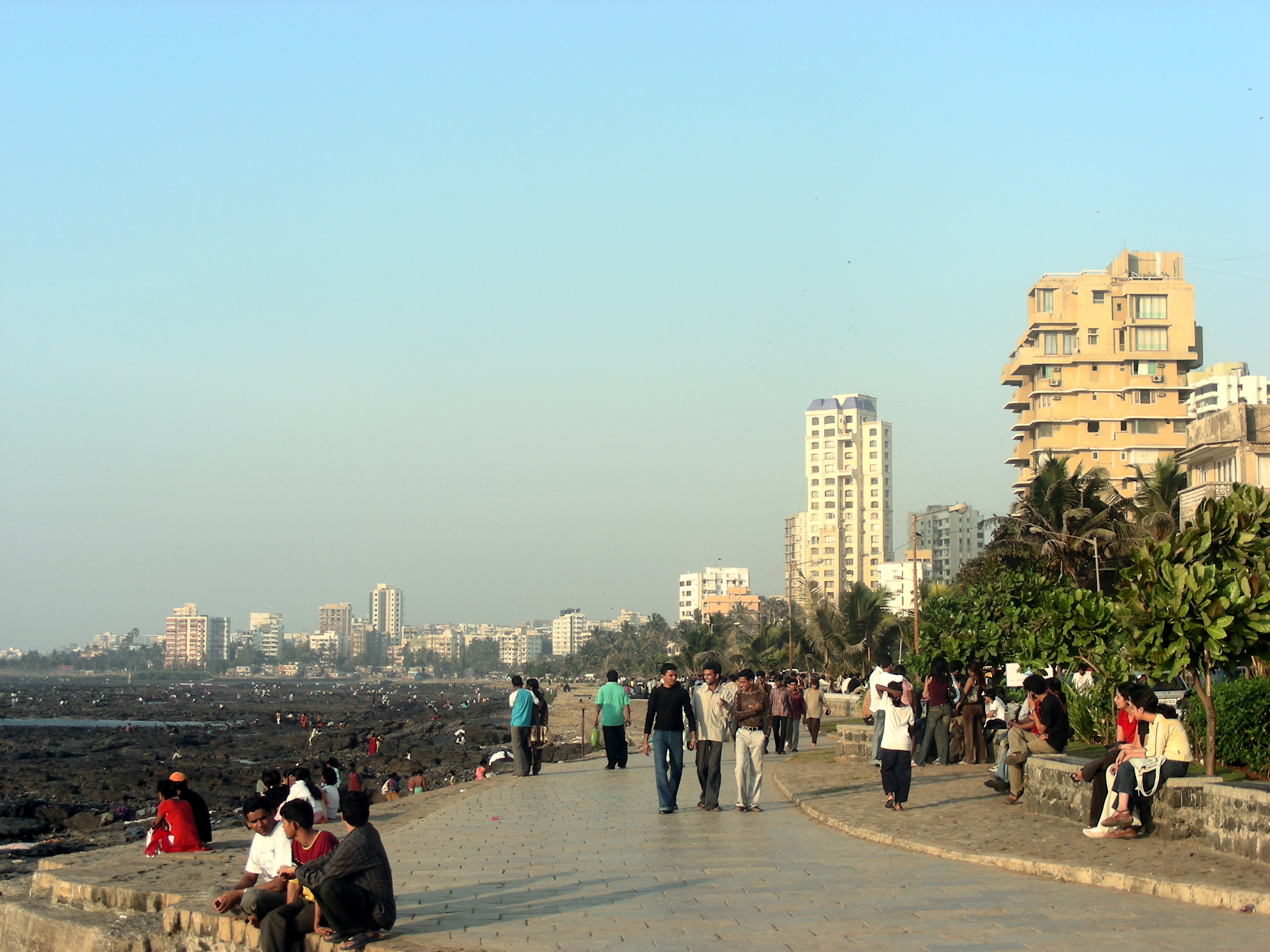
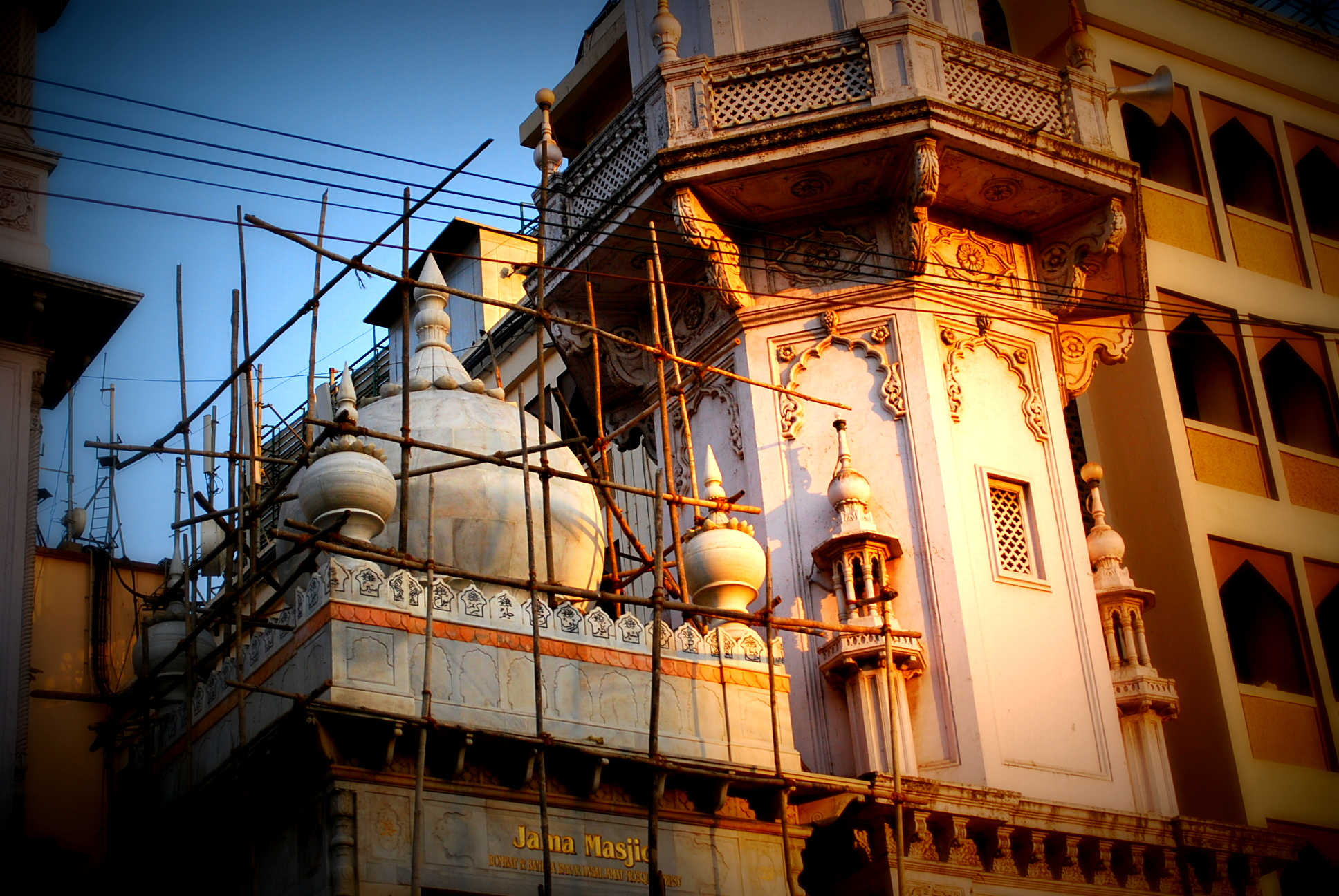
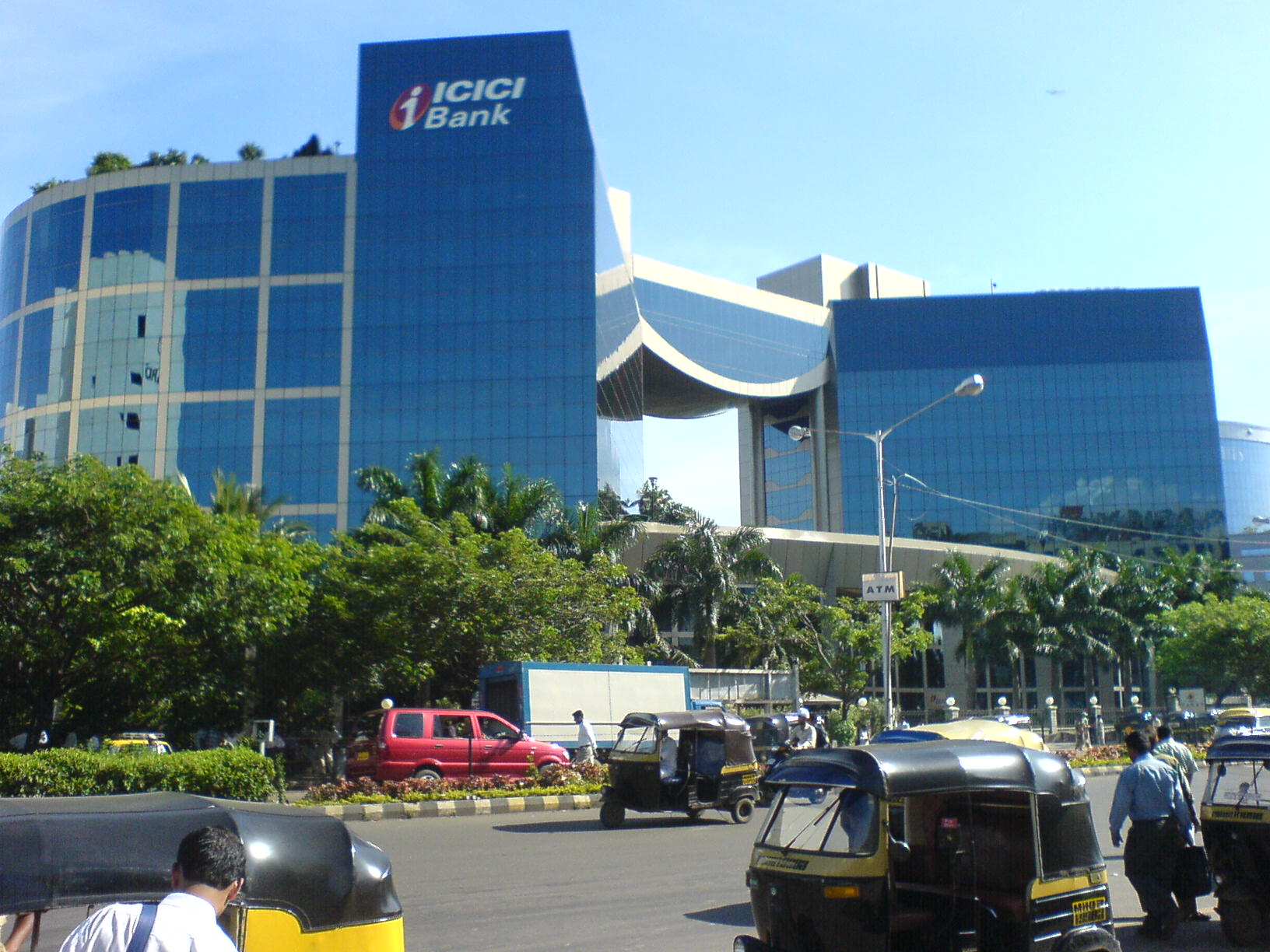
- Bandra–Worli Sea Link, IL & FS - Bandra Kurla Complex, PWC office, Mumbai Bandstand Promenade, Jama Masjid Bandra and ICICI Bank

- Location of Bandra in Maharashtra, India
- Coordinates: 19°3′27.368″N 72°49′46.909″E
- Country: India
- State: Maharashtra
- District: Mumbai Suburban
- City: Mumbai
- Zone: 3
- Ward: H West

Government
  - Type: Municipal corporation
  - Body: Brihanmumbai Municipal Corporation (BMC)

Population (2017)
  - Total: 337,391
- Demonyms: Mumbaikar

Languages
  - Official: Marathi
- Time zone: UTC+5:30 (IST)
- PIN: Bandra - 400050, 400051
- Vehicle registration: MH-02
- Lok Sabha constituency: Mumbai North Central
- Vidhan Sabha constituency: Bandra West (covers Bandra West); Bandra East (covers Bandra East)

Bandra ([bæːɳɖɾa]) is a coastal suburb located in Mumbai, the largest city of the Konkan division in Maharashtra, India. The area is located to the immediate north of the Mithi River, which separates Bandra from the Mumbai City district. It is the third-largest commercial hub in Maharashtra, after the Mumbai City and Pune, primarily aided by the Bandra Kurla Complex.

Before the opening of Khar Road railway station on 1 July 1924, Bandra was a larger area and included the present-day Khar neighbourhood. It was considered too large a suburb to be served by one railway station, and a railway station was established to give the northern part of Bandra closer access to the Western Railway line. This eventually led to Khar being considered a separate suburb. However, to this day, the two adjoined suburbs make up one homogeneous zone. A number of prominent residents of Bandra are celebrities or VIPs who are or have been active in Hindi cinema, media, cricket, or politics.

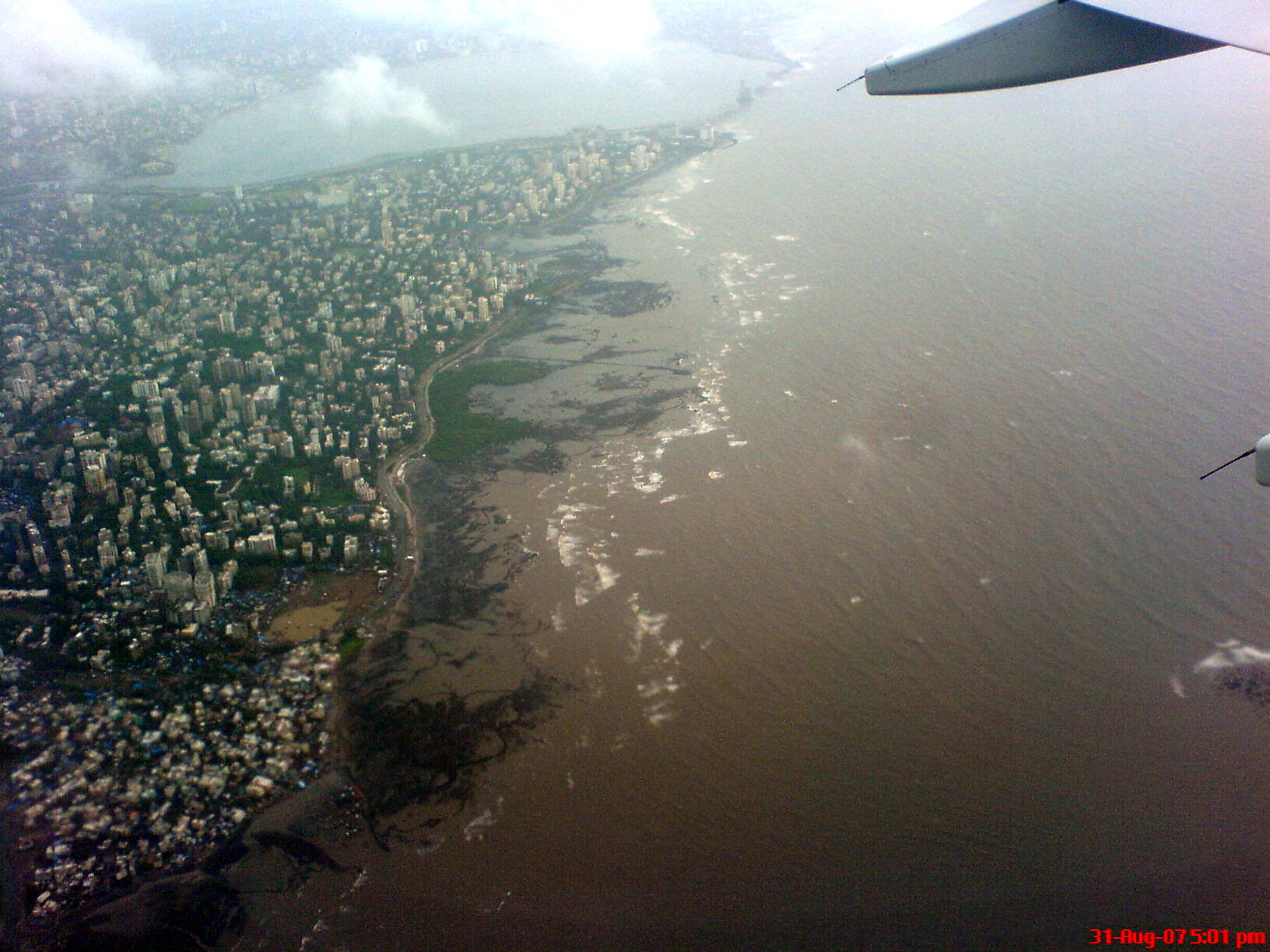
View of Bandra from an aeroplane window, while taking off from the Chhatrapati Shivaji Maharaj International Airport

== History ==
The original name of the suburb, Vandre, originates from the Marathi word for 'monkeys', vandr. However, another theory suggests that "Bandra", possibly originates from the Persian word bandar 'port'. It is described by Duncan Forbes's in A Dictionary, Hindustani and English (1848) as "a city; an emporium; a port, harbour; a trading town to which numbers of foreign merchants resort". In Konkani, bandar is a loanword from Persian meaning 'harbour' or 'port'.

The area, along with much of the Konkan region, was ruled by the Silhara dynasty in the 12th century. Bandra was a tiny fishing village inhabited by Kolis (fishermen) and salt farmers. The area was part of Portuguese Bombay territory, extending from Damaon to Chaul, before its acquisition by the English East India Company.

=== Indo-Portuguese era ===
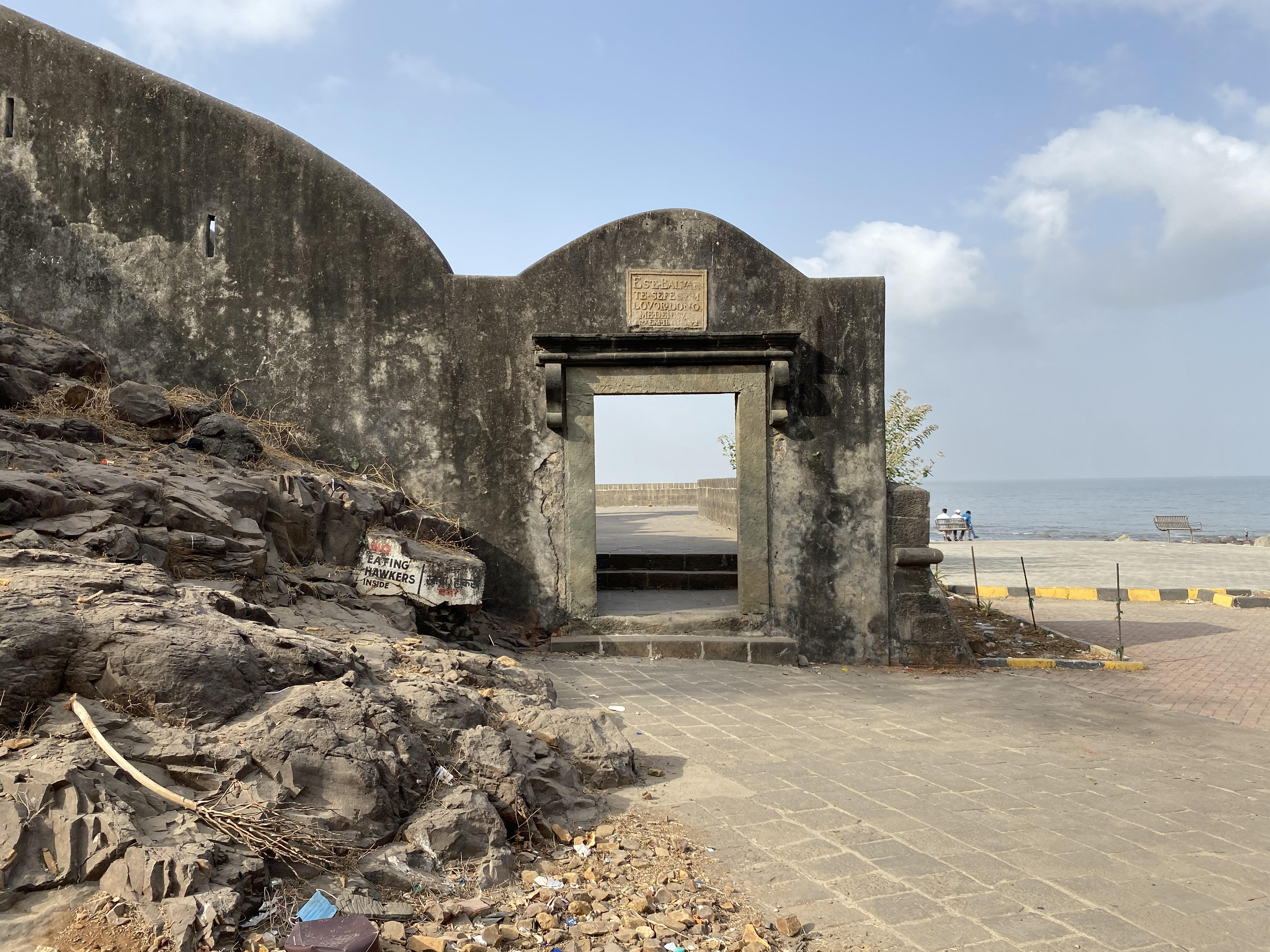
Entrance of the Bandra Fort, originally known as the "Castella de Aguada", Portuguese for "Fort of the Waterpoint"

In 1534, Diego da Silveira, a pirate from the Mediterranean, entered Bandra's creek and burned the fishing town he found there. With that, Bandra came under the rule of the Portuguese Goa.

A period of Christianisation began in Bandra. Father Conceicao Rodrigues, a Catholic priest, was instrumental in increasing the Church's prominence in Bandra. In 1580, he baptised about 2,000 fishermen. By the time he died 11 years later, Father Gomes' "invincible strength of soul", as one historian describes it, had helped convert close to 6,000 people in the area. Father Gomes also established St. Andrew's Church.

Bandra officially became a possession of the Portuguese East Indies when the Sultanate of Cambay ceded Bandra and adjacent areas via the Treaty of Bassein (1534), which was signed aboard the brig named Sao Mateus (St. Matthew) at Vasai (Bassein) harbour, aided by Governor-General Nuno da Cunha and Diego da Silveira. The Portuguese enfeoffed (gave) Bandra, Kurla, Mazgaon, and four other villages in 1548 to António Pessoa; as a reward for his military services. This was confirmed by the Royal Chancellery on 2 February 1550.

As these villages were given for a period of "two lives", they reverted to the Portuguese Crown after the death of Isabel Botelha, Pessoa's widow. In 1568, the Jesuits who had applied for acquisition of these villages in anticipation of Isabel's death, obtained them from the Portuguese viceroy in Goa, they received royal confirmation from Lisbon, in 1570.

In 1661, when Charles II of England married Catherine of Portugal, the Seven Islands of Bombay were given away as part of the dowry of Catherine Braganza. However, Salsette Island, on which Bandra laid, was not part of this treaty and remained with the Portuguese.

The Portuguese Empire built additional chapels, oratories& churches in Bandra, one of the earliest being St Andrew's Church in 1575. Their Jesuit missionaries, who learned local languages and cultures, attracted many Indian converts to Western Christianity (Catholicism) among the natives of the island. Their descendants continued their membership of the six Catholic parish churches—Mount Carmel, St. Peter's, St Andrew's, St Theresa's, St Anne's and St Francis d'Assisi; that lie within an area of four square kilometres.

=== British Bandra ===
Bandra became part of the English territory with the signing of the Treaty of Surat in 1775, but was retroceded to the Marathas in 1779 during the First Anglo-Maratha War. In 1802, Baji Rao II signed the Treaty of Bassein with the English, surrendering sovereignty and again ceding Bandra, and it remained under British control until 14 August 1947.

Arrival of Railways and Development: On 12 April 1867, the first railway service was inaugurated, with one train per day between Virar and Mumbai, as part of the then private rail company, BB&CI, which was the earliest form of Western Railway. A grand railway station building for Bandra was inaugurated in 1869. The innovative aspects used in the design of this structure are visible to this day. On closer scrutiny, it is evident how railway tracks bunched together, make up each of the iron pillars, that hold up the roof over the platforms. In 1873, with growing demands, the frequency of trains available was increased to 24 each day. In the early 1900s, the affluent Pathare Prabhu community lived in South Mumbai, and used their quaint bungalows in the Khar part of Bandra as weekend dwellings. Khar Danda was one of the original villages of the erstwhile larger Bandra. Back then, the local Bandra railway station was felt considerably far to alight from trains and hire 'tangas' (horse carriages) to get to their bungalows by these Bandra residents. Keeping these factors and Bandra's growing population in mind, a new railway station named 'Khar Road' was introduced adjoining Bandra Railway station on 1 July 1924. This development is the primary reason that the Khar part of Bandra started being referred to as a suburb by itself. As late as the 1930s, Bandra had only one bus service from Pali Naka, Hill Road, to the Railway station. Other people just walked to the nearest railway station. After World War II, the building boom began with an aim to accommodate immigrants. As of 2018, 940 trains stop daily at Bandra railway station.

Bandra was raised to the status of a municipality in 1876 and was then expanded. In 1950, following independence, it was merged into the Bombay Municipal Corporation to form the Brihanmumbai Municipal Corporation. Bandra consisted of many villages, among them Sherly, Malla, Rajan, Kantwady, Waroda, Ranwar, Boran, Khar Danda, Pali, and Chuim. These have almost been lost to the urban development of the island.

==== Mount Mary's Church ====
Statue of Mary at Basilica of Our Lady of the Mount, Bandra

The Bandra Fair is held during the eight days of the Octave of the Nativity of Our Lady, beginning 8 September, when people throng the church.

==== Educational institutions ====
The first school founded in Bandra after Bombay passed on to the English was St Andrew's Parish School, started by Fr. Francisco de Melo in 1780 to teach catechism to the children of the parish. This later became St. Andrew's High School. The school is located in Bandra West.

St. Theresa's High School grew out of St. Andrew's Indian Christians' School, housed in a very dilapidated building situated in Old Khar. This school was founded in 1918. It was taken over by the Society of Divine Word (S.V.D). in 1952. It is counted among the best schools in Mumbai.

St. Stanislaus High School was founded in 1863 by the Society of Jesus. It started as a Native Boy's orphanage. It became a high school in 1923 and was the first English medium school in the suburbs. Later, it grew to be a full-fledged educational institution for day-scholars as well as boarders. Cardinal Gracias High School is a convent school located in Bandra East. St. Joseph's Convent High School for girls is run by the nuns of the congregation of the Daughters of the Cross in Bandra West. It was built in 1865 (Bandra was then known as Bandora) and boasts a chapel. The school has produced illustrious alumni over the years. R. D. National College was originally set up in 1922 in Hyderabad, Pakistan under the guidance of Annie Besant. In the run-up to the Partition of India, it was relocated to its present site in 1949 in Bandra. The Thadomal Shahani Engineering College was established in 1983 by the Hyderabad (Sind) National Collegiate Board.

The Rizvi Education Complex, located off Carter Road, comprises the Rizvi College of Arts, Science and Commerce as well as Rizvi High School (both established in 1985); Rizvi College of Engineering (established in 1998); Rizvi College of Architecture; Rizvi College of Hotel Management & Catering Technology; Rizvi Law College; Rizvi College of Education and the Rizvi College of Fashion Designing & Creative Arts. All are managed by the Rizvi Education Society, and may have the status of Muslim religious minority institution.

St. Andrew's College of Arts, Science and Commerce is another famous college located in the heart of Bandra, just a few hundred metres away from St. Stanislaus High School. St. Andrews boasts of one of the best auditoriums in the city.

IES's Management College and Research Centre is also located at Bandra Reclamation. It offers PGDM programs related to management and pharma.

==== Bandra Lake ====
Bandra Talao, also called Bandra Talao or Motha Reservoir, was constructed by a rich Konkani Muslim of Navapada (also spelled Naupada or Naopara), an adjoining village.

The lake was later acquired by the Municipal Corporation of Greater Mumbai. It was officially renamed Swami Vivekanand Sarovar. Paddle boating facilities and pisciculture (fish farming) activities were operational in this lake during the 1990s but have since stopped. This lake is now a heritage structure of "Heritage II" status. The Portuguese also pronounced Bandra As Bandora.

=== Development of Bandra as a commercial hub ===
As traffic in the Mumbai Metropolitan Region worsened, especially in South Mumbai, there was increased demand to construct a business district outside of Mumbai, in the suburbs. In the mid-2000s, the city of Mumbai started an audacious task to reclaim lands on the Mithi River in the eastern portion of the city, near the Kurla border. The newly formed Bandra Kurla Complex (BKC) has attracted several equity and technology firms, such as Blackstone, Google, and Amazon, who chose Bandra instead of Mumbai City for its location, lower-cost of land, and new development.

As the last suburb before entering Mumbai City, Bandra has for a while been strained with traffic, particularly around the railway station and S.V. Road. The development of a business centre has only exacerbated the traffic problems, as unlike other commercial hubs, Bandra's BKC is located between Bandra and Kurla stations and requires approximately 10-15 minute vehicular commute from either of the stations. Nearly 300,000 office-goers alight daily at Bandra Railway Station and take a taxi or bus to BKC. This has made Bandra among the busiest stations in India, surpassing Andheri and Bombay Central, and the second-busiest station in Maharashtra's Western Railway after Churchgate railway station.

=== Terror attacks ===
In 1993, a group of terrorists attacked a hotel in Bandra in addition to other sites in the city.

== Urban art ==
Bandra has a large collection of street art or graffiti. The paintings on walls are principally located in the vicinity of Chapel Road and Veronica Street, but prominent works are also visible near the Bandstand and Mount Mary Church. They consist of various types of graffiti, including pieces, stencils, tags, etc. Globally renowned artists such as Gomez have created works on these walls. St+art Mumbai, Bollywood Art Project and Dharavi Art Room are some of the organisations that conduct various programs to encourage the artists. The programs have support from the Brihanmumbai Municipal Corporation (BMC). Bandra was also home to the 37X46 metre (120X150 foot) portrait of Dadasaheb Phalke on the MTNL building at Bandra Reclamation. It was created by Ranjit Dahiya (from the Bollywood Art Project) and other artists including Yantr, Munir Bukhari and Nilesh Kharade as part of the St+art Mumbai festival in 2014. The mural was unveiled officially by Amitabh Bachchan and Piyush Pandey, but the building has been re-painted. It is reportedly Asia's largest mural.

== In literature ==
Many of the characters in the book Bloodline Bandra by Godfrey Joseph Pereira (2014), are East Indian, including the protagonist, journalist, David Cabral, who reside in a village (hamlet) called Pali in Bandra. The book itself is set in the 1950s with the first half of the book having most of the action in Pali Village, a predominantly East Indian populace at the time.

== Geography ==
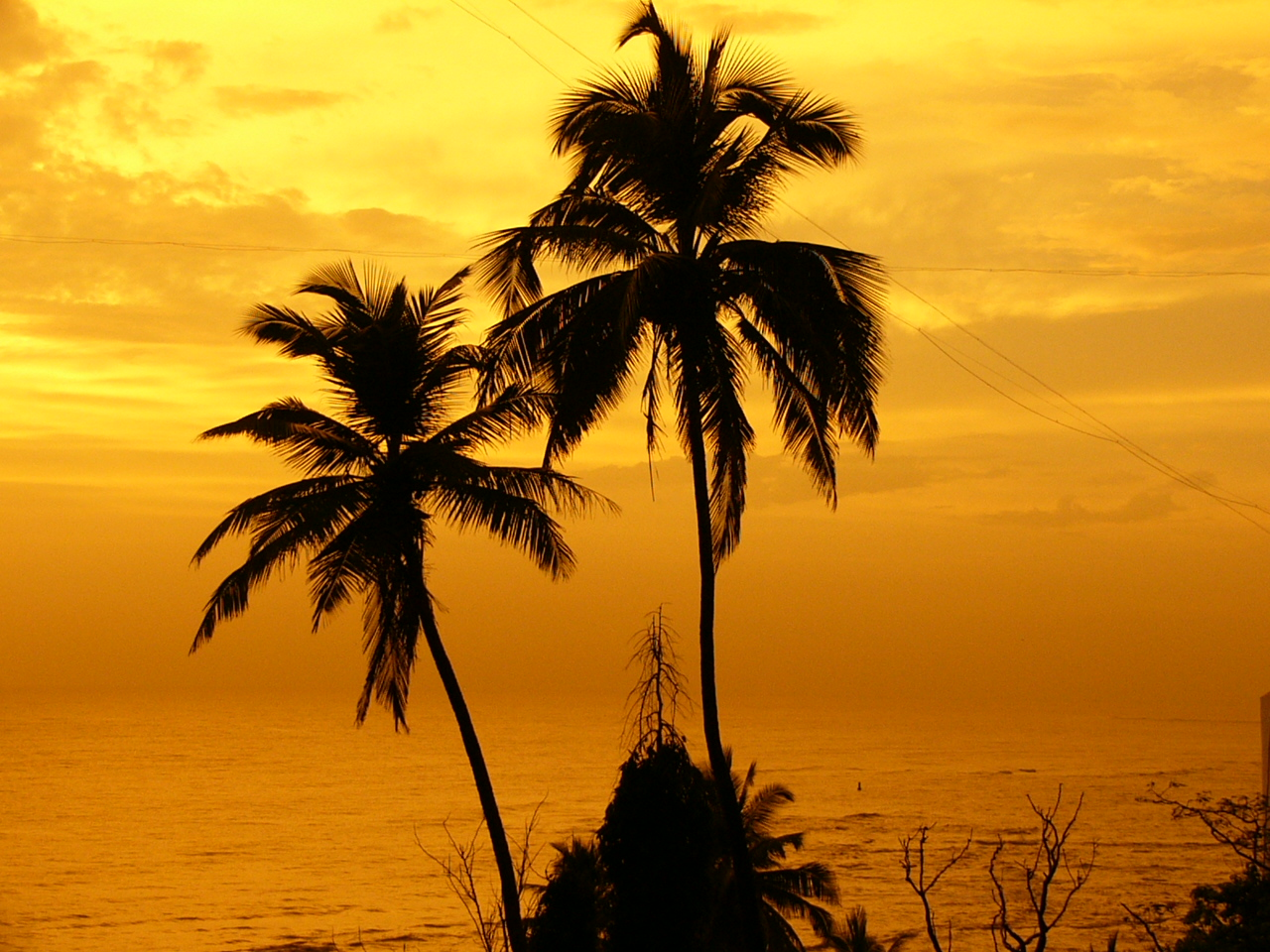
Sunset at Bandra Bandstand

Bandra is split by the local railway-line into West Bandra (Postal Code 400050) and East Bandra (Postal Code 400051). The part of Bandra located on the western side of the railway line developed into a fashionable suburb by the middle of the 20th century. Film director Mehboob Khan established the Mehboob Studios here in 1954. Soon the area became a center for the Indian movie industry, Bollywood. A recording studio was set up in the 1970s.

In the mid-to-late 1990s, the eastern part emerged as a commercial and administrative hub. It houses the Family Court, Bandra Kurla Commercial Complex, the office of the state housing development authority (MHADA) and the office of the District Collector. The residential quarters of the employees of the Maharashtra State Government are also located here.

Most roads and places in Bandra were given English names during British rule. They have been renamed over time but many are still popularly known by their old names.

- Neighbouring suburbs: Dharavi, Khar, Kurla, Mahim, Santa Cruz
- Arterial roads: Swami Vivekanand Road (S.V Road), Linking Road, Turner Road (Guru Nanak Marg), Hill Road (renamed Ramdas Nayak Marg), Carter Road (renamed Naushad Ali Marg), Navpada Road (Balsamant), Western Express Highway. The Bandra–Worli Sea Link connects the western part of Bandra to Worli by the sea route, thus diverting a lot of road traffic.

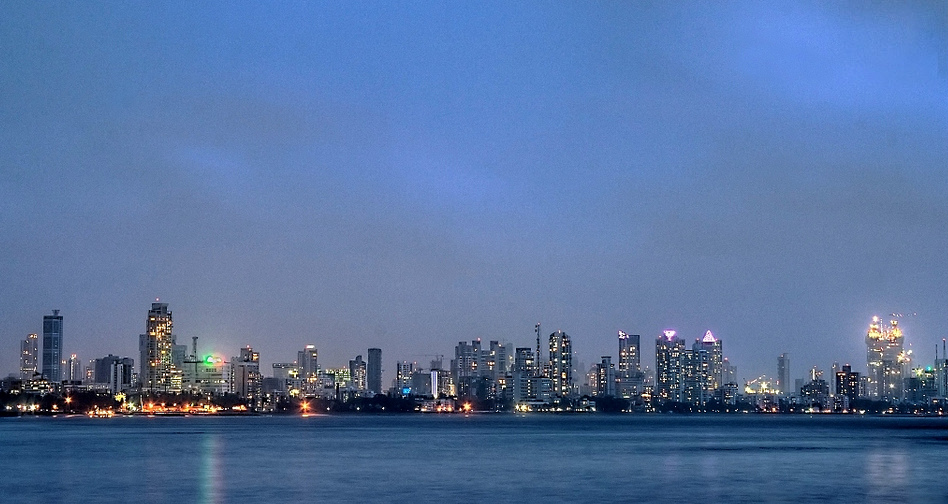
Worli skyline as seen from Bandra Reclamation

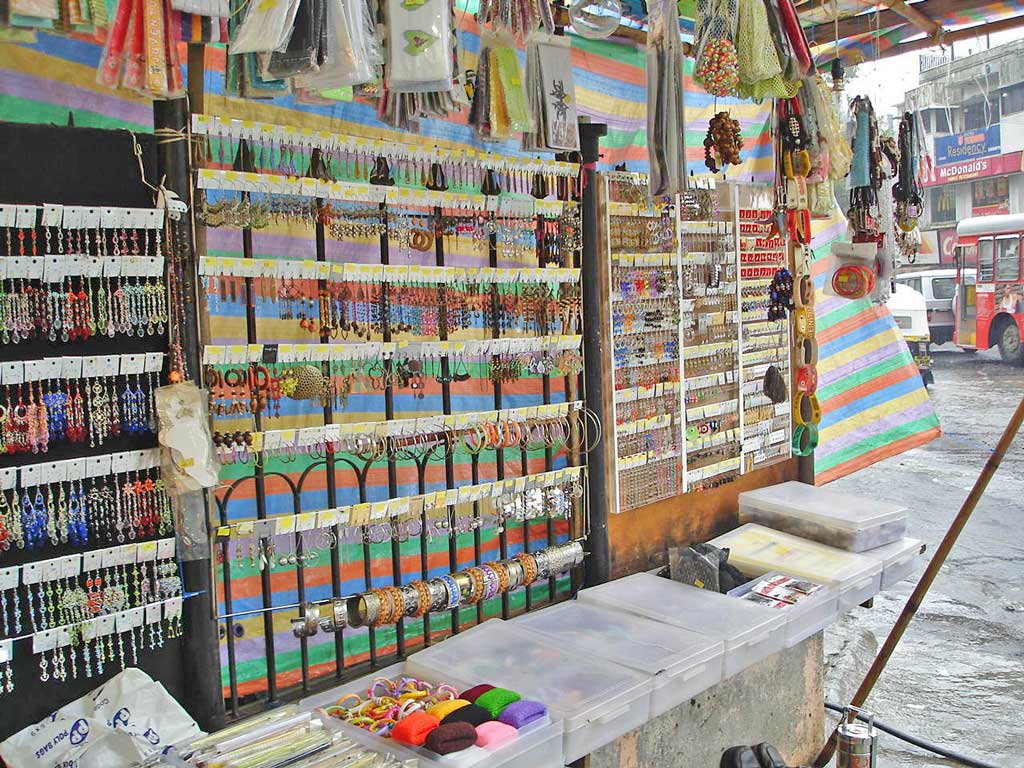
A stall on Linking Road

== Transport ==
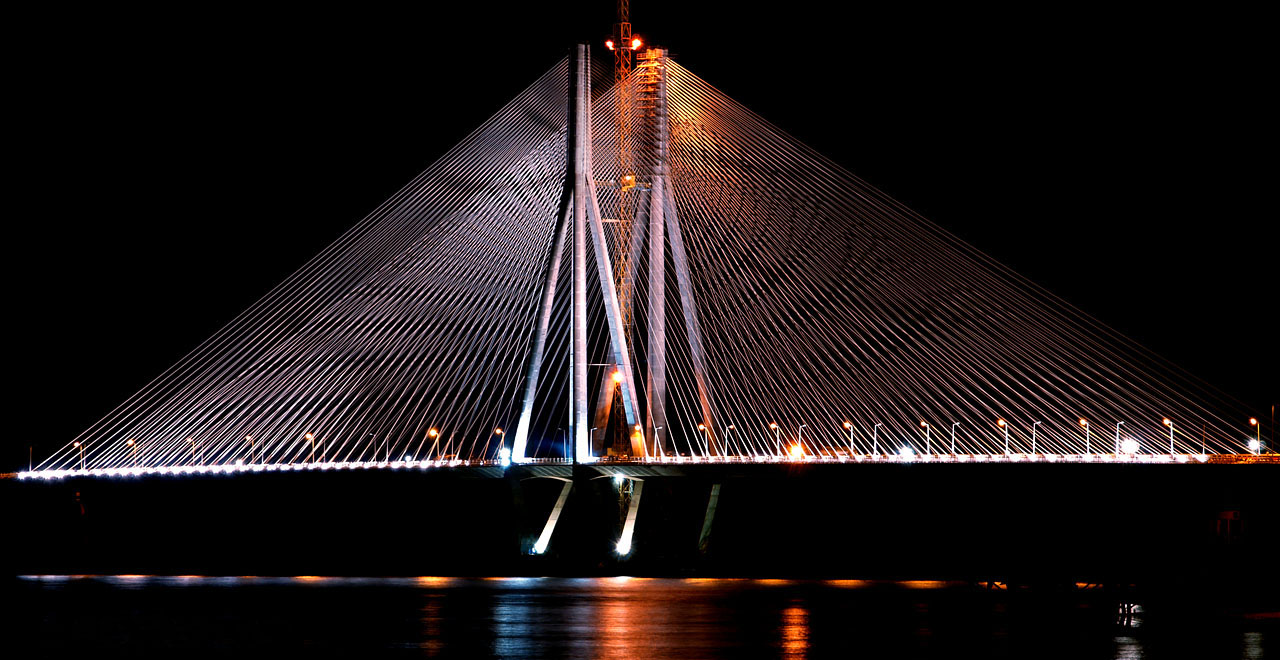
Bandra-Worli Sealink project

Bandra railway station is connected with the Western Railway and the Harbour Line, which is an offshoot of the suburban Central Railway. It also has a newly built terminus called Bandra Terminus in Bandra (E) from where trains bound for northern and western India are scheduled regularly. The important trains include the Bandra-New Delhi Rajdhani Express, Bandra-Indore Express, Bandra-Patna Express, Bandra-Jaipur Express, Bandra-Jodhpur Express and the Bandra-Amritsar Express.

Public transport also includes BEST buses, auto rickshaws and taxis, which are abundant. Bandra is the last southern point from Mumbai where auto rickshaws ply. Beyond Bandra, entering Mahim, only taxis are allowed to ply.

The Bandra–Worli Sea Link bridge connects Bandra West with Worli, located in central Mumbai. Due to Bandra's central location, most parts of the city are easily accessible.

== Places of interest ==
Mount Mary's Basilica

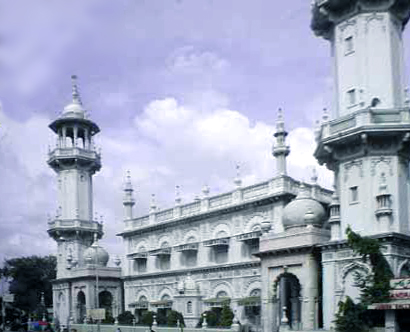
Jamaa Masjid

- Jogger's Park, a small seaside jogging track. The park, next to the Otter's Club, was where Mumbai's first laughing club was launched.
- Khar Danda, one of the oldest villages in Bandra
- Ranwar Village
- Mount Mary's Basilica
- Bandstand Promenade
- Hill Road, a popular street shopping area with various restaurants and retail brands
- Linking Road, a shopping area
- Pali Hill, an affluent residential locality with several restaurants and eateries
- Carter Road Promenade
- Bandra Fort, also known as Castella de Aguada (Portuguese for Fort of the Waterpoint)
- Colonial-era bungalows; Bandra's unique architectural heritage is being threatened by ongoing development.

== Notable residents ==
- Farhan Akhtar, film actor
- Zoya Akhtar, film director
- Lieutenant-General Francis Dias, PVSM, AVSM, VrC
- Sanjay Dutt, film actor
- Karan Johar, film director
- Diya Joukani, fashion designer and influencer
- Reema Kagti, film director
- Salman Khan, film actor
- Shah Rukh Khan, film actor
- Aamir Khan, film actor
- Nicholas Kharkongor, film director
- Mithila Palkar, film actor
- Flt Lt Lawrence Pereira, VrC
- Rekha, film actor
- Bala Sawant, politician and former Shiv Sena MLA
- Ashish Shelar, president of BJP Mumbai
- Sachin Tendulkar, cricketer
- Asif Zakaria, Congress candidate for 177 - Bandra West Assembly Constituency

== See also ==
- Villages in Bandra, Mumbai
- Bandra Government Colony
