= Bandra Municipal Committee =

Committee which governed Bandra and surrounding areas from 1876-1950

The Bandra Municipal Committee was the governing body of the township of Bandra in suburban Mumbai (Bombay) 1876-1950. Initially concerned with the civic functions of Bandra, it expanded to include the suburb of Khar and Santra Cruz by 1933. In 1950, the municipality was merged with the Bombay Municipal Corporation under the Bombay Act No. VII of 1950.

The Municipality of Bandra established in 1876 had in 1880-81 an income of £1536 (Rs. 15,360) representing a taxation of 2s. 0½d. (Rs. 1-0-4) a head. This income chiefly comes from taxes on houses, boats, and roads. During 1880-81 the expenditure amounted to £844 (Rs. 8440), of which £239 (Rs. 2390) were spent on scavenging, £84 (RS. 840) on lighting, and £520 (Rs. 5200) on roads. The chief municipal works are new markets in Bandra and at Khar, representing a cost of £410 (Rs. 4104), and new roads representing a cost of £1169 (Rs. 11,690).[The Bandra markets were built from Local Funds in 1874 at. a cost of £443 (Rs. 4430), and handed over to the municipality who objected to pay the coat sum.] The Bandra municipal district includes the following villages which lie either together or within half a mile of each other: Naupada, Khar, Pali, Varoda, Chimbai, Katvadi, Mala, Sherli Rajan, Chui, and Danda. Of public offices and institutions there are, besides the railway station, a post office, a dispensary, and seven schools. The Sir Kavasji Jahanghir Readymoney Dispensary was founded in 1851 at the request of several influential inhabitants of Salsette. Subscriptions seem to have accumulated as, in 1867, there was a balance of £1920 (Rs. 19,207). In 1874 Government sanctioned a yearly grant of £260 (Rs. 2600) to pay a medical officer and staff of servants. In 1877 Sir Kavasji Jahanghir handed over £1000 (Rs. 10,000) to Government who directed that the dispensary should be called by his name. The attendance in 1880-81 was 14,565 out-patients and five in-patients. One or two private dispensaries are also kept by Bombay practitioners, chiefly native Christians. Most of their patients belong to the middle and upper classes, and their fees vary from 4s. to 6s. (Rs. 2- Rs. 3) a visit. Of the schools the Jesuits maintain the St. Stanislaus' Orphanage and St. Joseph's Convent, the former with 235 boys and the latter with 214 girls. The following schools are also kept by the native Christian clergy: a Diocesan School with an attendance of 170 pupils, a Portuguese Catechism School at Sherli with an attendance of 50, and St. Vincent's School at Pali with an attendance of 45. There are also two Government Anglo-vernacular schools, one at Bandra with 130 boys and 10 girls and one at Danda with 28 boys. The elementary education of native Christian children is fairly provided for, and as a rule they do not attend the Government schools
