= Pali Hill =

- Neighbourhood
- Location in Mumbai
- Coordinates: 19.068263°N 72.828363°E
- Country: India
- State: Maharashtra
- District: Mumbai Suburban - Bandra + Khar
- City: Mumbai

Government
  - Type: Brihanmumbai Municipal Corporation (MCGM)
- PIN Codes: 400050 and 400052

Pali Hill is an affluent residential area spread across the adjoined suburbs of Bandra and Khar in Mumbai, India (sharing postal codes 400050 and 400052 respectively).

== Geography ==
Pali Hill lies on the western side of Mumbai. It runs parallel to Naushad Ali Road (previously Carter Road), a popular sea-front and promenade that stretches from Jogger's Park, Bandra to the Khar Danda fishing village in Khar.

Situated mainly on rolling hills with alternate steep and shallow sides, it garnered the name Pali Hill, although more than one hill is present. The main route of the road was smoothed and paved. The buildings and bungalows are set within the "valleys" and "crests" of the hills. Nearby localities include Pali Village and Pali Naka.

== History ==
Until the 1950s, the area was mainly forested with dense undergrowth. Over the years, it was converted to grow fruits and crops. At one time, the sea was plainly visible from the foothills.

A few buildings were constructed by entrepreneurs and builders. However, most people lived in cottages or bungalows. Construction of apartment buildings commenced in the mid to late 1960s, including Nibbana Apartments.

Cottage dwellers slowly sold their homes to real estate developers and Pali Hill grew into an affluent neighbourhood.

K. Street Pali Hill (2004–2006), a thriller television soap on StarPlus, produced by Ekta Kapoor (Balaji Telefilms) was set in the suburb.

== Flora and fauna ==
Pali Hill has an expanse of trees that form arches over the roads. Originally an area of orchards, fields and untamed forests, from 1980 to 2020 it was deforested and made suitable for residential habitation. A few giant trees remain in building compounds, bungalow gardens and on the roads. The most widely seen tree is the gulmohar tree. Large (and rare in Mumbai) banyan trees, peepul trees, mango trees, ashoka trees, wild almond trees, wild neem trees as well as a variety of shrubs, grasses, bamboos and trees, like those of the papaya, jackfruit, custard-apple and guava are abundant.

Flowering shrubs are cultivated and sometimes grow wild. Most abundant are bougainvillea, jasmines, birds of paradise flowers and another wild, indigenous varieties.

Pali Hill is frequented by migratory birds, present during different seasons. Although the native species are sparrows, Asian koels, cuckoos, wrens, pigeons, crows and ravens; rare birds (from other parts of Mumbai/India) are present. Bai Avabai Framji Petit Girls High School sees egrets, storks, owls and other rare birds. Ashy Dorus, kites, kestrels, hummingbirds, woodpeckers as well as seagulls and kingfishers (both – the small blue kingfisher as well as the more colourful variant) are present. Ornithologist Salim Ali was known to walk around Pali Hill with his binoculars and a notebook taking notes and listening to or making bird calls.

Mammals such as dogs (from street strays to pedigrees), cats and small bats are abundant.

== Landmarks ==
Pali Hill's landmarks are its buildings and bungalows. At the southern end is Rajendra Kumar Junction (Chowk). Its four roads lead west to Carter Road (via Pali Mala Road), north to Pali Hill, east to Pali Naka and south to the Auxilium Convent High School. At the northern end in Khar is Union Park, another crossing and the area around it. Candies eatery is another local landmark.

The road diverges downhill on the East side – the Zig Zag Road (named after its steep incline and acute curves). At this junction was the Anand Bungalow (owned by Dev Anand). Also at this junction is the bungalow of the Narangs, hoteliers, and owners of the Croissants patisserie and the Ambassador Flight kitchen. On Nargis Dutt road, further down on the west side is the House Of Sushil Kumar Shinde (former Chief Minister of Maharashtra & former Home Minister Of The Govt of India). On the other side residence of the late Rajni Patel ( Rajni Patel was a lawyer, trade union leader and politician – and much more – who dominated the political landscape of Bombay in the 1970s. He was a close associate and adviser of Indira Gandhi. A Cambridge-educated lawyer, he had been on the watch list of British authorities during his days in Britain and upon his return to India, got involved in cooperative movements and public life in general. His legal battles in the courts are legendary)Rajni Patel's widow Bakul Patel was a former Sheriff of Mumbai. More down the road on the hill is BSES Niwas, a property now being developed for and by Reliance ADAGnow Adnani. lying adjacent is the Reservoir at 'The Top Of The Hill' holding and supplying Water to the residents of both sides of the Hill. Further down the southern slopes of the hill resided the Late Nargis Dutt and her husband the late Sunil Dutt, the two besides been thespians were also connected politically Mr. Sunil Dutt, a politician, after he joined the Indian National Congress party, he had the unique distinction of getting elected to the Parliament of India for five terms from the Mumbai North West constituency. On the bend is the Residence of the famous Dilip Kumar whose thespian wife Saira Banu lives therein.

Down towards Union Park & Golf Links at the North Khar end of the hill is the residence of the former chief minister of Maharashtra Mr. Narayan Rane. The Golf Course today is no more, it is filed by high rise buildings overseeing the nets of The "Danda' fishing Village.

Other landmarks include Kangaroo Kids Nursery and Playschool, Juice Salon, Sundaram Stores, cozy home apartments. At Union Park lies Bai Avabai Framji Petit Girls' High School. down the slope on the eastern side is the Pali Market, now under reconstruction. In the 19th century, Pali Hill was called Pakhari HIll.

== Notable residents ==
- Kripashankar Singh Former Home Minister of Maharashtra, Presidents of Mumbai Congress, & MLA From Kalina
- Kumar Gaurav
- Rajendranath Zutshi
- Aamir Khan
- Prithviraj Sukumaran - malayalam actor, playback singer, filmmaker and producer
- Lara Dutta and Mahesh Bhupathi
- Dj Aqeel (DJ and music composer)
- Gulzar, poet, lyricist, writer, at his bungalow Boskiyana
- Gulshan Bawra, lyricist
- Rishi Kapoor and Neetu Kapoor
- Ranbir Kapoor
- Narayan Rane
- Sanjeev Kumar
- Kunal Kohli
- Prem Chopra, Moushmi Chatterjee and Vinod Mehra
- Anil Dhawan
- Amjad Khan and his family
- Pran Krishan Sikand
- Mahesh Bhatt and Pooja Bhatt
- Models Tapur Chatterjee and Kirat Bhattal
- Anna Singh, fashion designer
- Emraan Hashmi, Bollywood Actor
- Asha Sachdev
- A.M. Naik, CEO, Executive Chairman and Managing Director of Larsen & Toubro Limited
- Playback Singer Kunal Ganjawalla, his wife, singer Gayatri Ganjawala
- Bharat Bhushan (actor)
- Meena Kumari (actress)
- Meghna Gulzar
- Kangana Ranaut, Indian actress and politician
- Imran Khan, American former bollywood actor
- Sanjay Dutt, Indian actor and producer

== Bibliography ==
- Bhatkal, Satyajit (editor: Lancy Fernandes). The Spirit of Lagaan: The extraordinary story of the creators of a classic. Popular Prakashan, 1 March 2002. ISBN 8179910032, 9788179910030. In Google Books under the title "Eka svapnācā pravāsa lagāna"
