= Pali Village =

Urban village in Bandra, India

Pali Village sometimes also referred as (Pali Goathan) is a small urban village in the Bandra suburb of Mumbai, India (formerly Bombay). Established in 1700s, it has lend its name to localities like Pali Hill and Pali Naka, Today, it is developing as a destination for heath spas and holistic healing centres, as well as chic restaurants.

== Overview ==
It is a mixed-zone neighborhood of Bandra and lies 650 meters from the coastline. The nearest coastline is the Carter Road edge of the Arabian Sea. Pali Village's Area Locality Management is known as PVRCF, or the Pali Village Residents Civic Forum, whose membership includes all residents of the Village. PVRCF's current Gen. Secretary is Asif Farooqui

Pali Village was settled around 1700 by the British Colonial Rulers

It is close to Pali Hill and Linking Road and its residents are mainly Catholics and Muslims.

== In literature ==
Bloodline Bandra by Godfrey Joseph Pereira (2014), features David Cabral a journalist and also one of the original peepils: an East Indian from Pali Village. The village is a world unto itself, and the villagers such notables as Salt Peter, Freddy Fakir, Basco Big Stomach, Carla Four Eyes, Lorna Leg Spread, Spunkless Joe and Small Tree Big Fruit.
