= Bandra Fair =

Fair in Mumbai (Bombay)

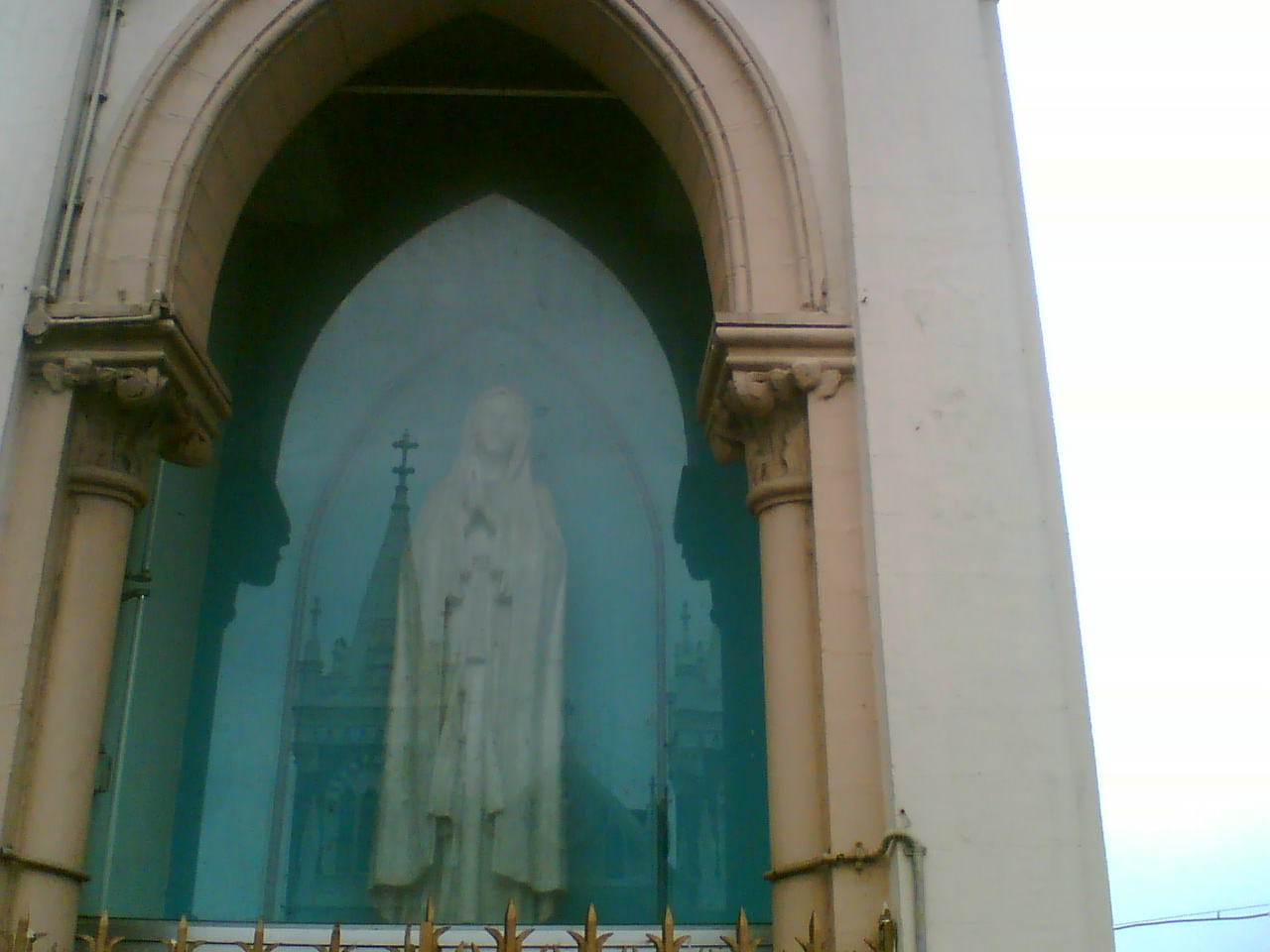
The statue of Our Lady of the Mount

The Bandra Fair is a week-long fair held annually in the Bandra suburb of Mumbai (Bombay), India. It starts on the Sunday following the 8th of September (Bandra Fest) at Mount St Mary Church; the festival of the Nativity of Our Lady, the virgin-mother of Jesus Christ.

The Bandra Fair is estimatedly around 300 years old. According to legend, the celebration began when a statue of St Mary was discovered floating in the Arabian Sea between 1700 and 1760, which a Koli Christian fisherman had already dreamt about earlier. Monti Fest celebrated by Goans, Karwaris & Mangaloreans is similar to the Bandra Fest, and coincides with the Nativity.

== History ==
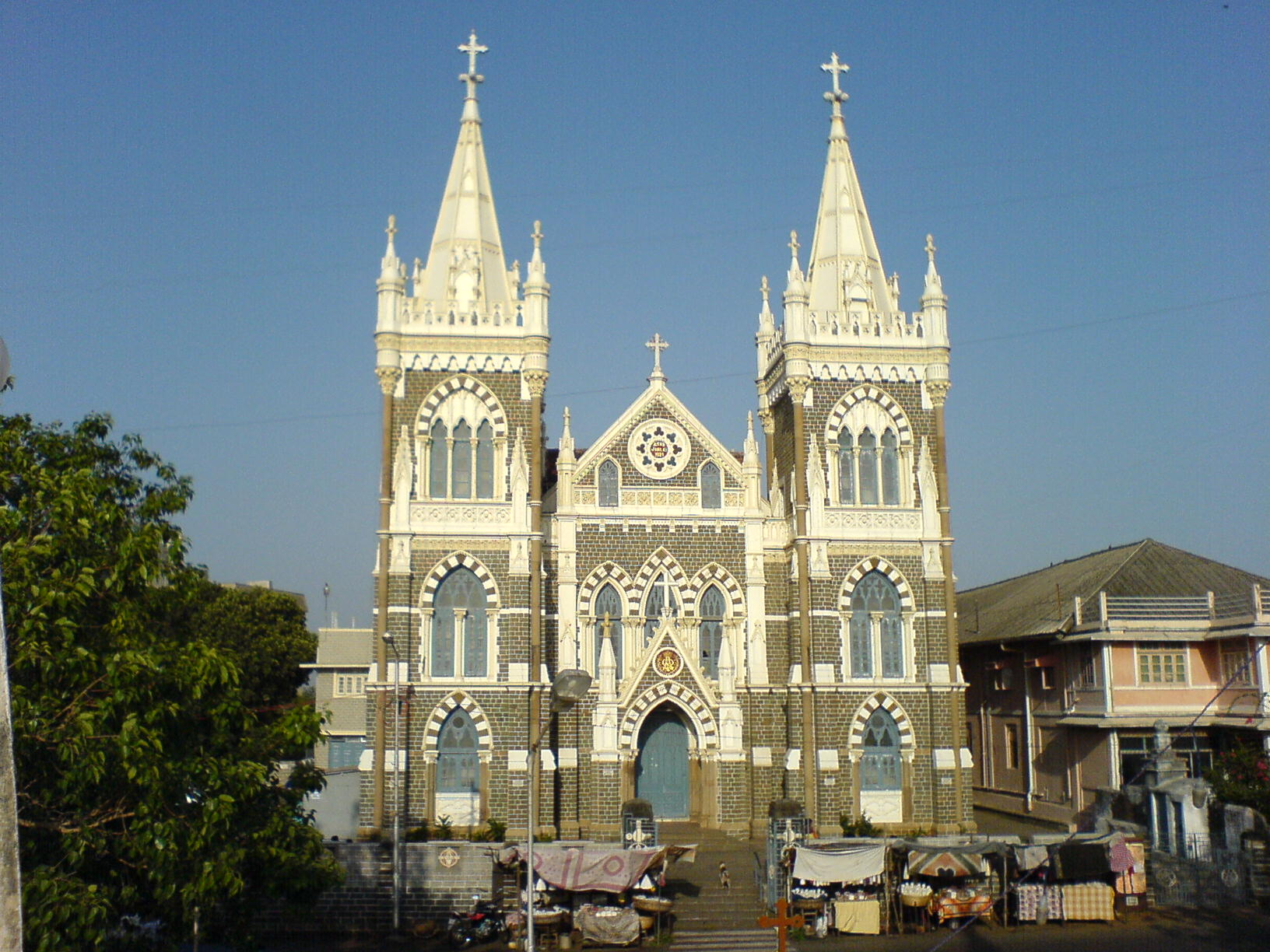
Front of the Mount St Mary Church in Bandra

Although the current church edifice is just 100 years old, the history behind the current statue of Our Lady of Mount goes back to the 16th century when Jesuit priests from Portugal brought the statue to Bandra and constructed the church there. In 1700, Arab pirates disfigured the statue by cutting off the right hand. In 1760, the church was rebuilt and the statue was substituted with a statue of Our Lady of Navigators from the St Andrew's Church nearby. This statue had an interesting legend. It goes that a Koli fisherman dreamt that he would find a statue in the sea. The statue was indeed found floating in the sea, sometime between 1700 and 1760. A Jesuit Annual Letter dated to 1669 and published in the book St Andrew's Church, Bandra (1616–1966) supports the claim. This was believed to be a miracle by the locals, and the Bandra Fair was started to celebrate the event. However, in 1761, the original statue of the Lady of Mount was renovated with a child in her arms and returned to the church.

The shrine began attracting tourists and pilgrims from all the surrounding areas of Bombay city and beyond. Devotees used to arrive at the foot of the hill by bullock carts. Some arrived by ferryboats from across the Mahim Creek. They would park their carts along groves of mango trees at the foot of the hill & walk up the slope to the basilica at the top. After concluding their spiritual obligations, the pilgrims would now move back down whilst enjoying the merry fair.

== Celebrations ==
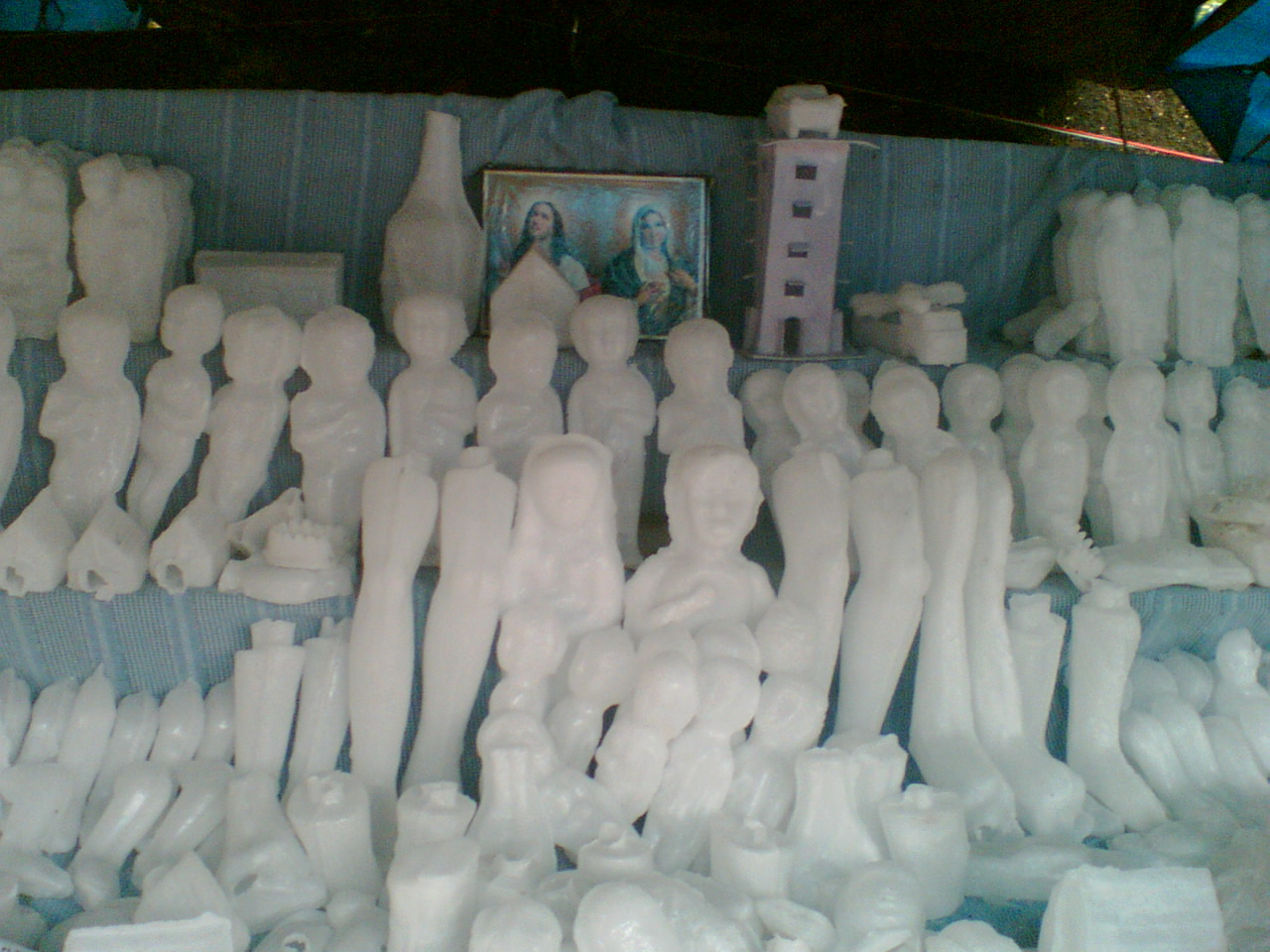
Stall selling wax offerings

The Fair draws lakhs of devotees and pilgrims annually. During the Fair, tens of thousands visit the shrine of Our Lady of Mount. The shrine attracts people from all faiths who pray to Mary in thanksgiving or requesting of favours. Many pitch up stalls selling religious objects and an assortment of candles shaped like hands, feet and various other parts of the body. The people who are ill choose one that corresponds to their ailment and offer it in the basilica along with their supplications.

After visiting the basilica, pilgrims descend from the Mount using the Steps on the eastern side. The stalls lining both sides on the way down offer pilgrims sweets like Guava cheese, Kadio bodio (tiny stick made of Maida flour dipped in sugar syrup and dried) from Goa, Mawa peda (thick cookie made using evaporated milk) from Uttar Pradesh, Halva from Kerala, Tamil Nadu, and Delhi, and the chikki (a sweet made from groundnuts and jaggery) from Maharashtra are usually found at the stalls during the fair. Only stalls erected within the boundaries of the basilica come under its jurisdiction, all other activity beyond that is organized and controlled by the Brihanmumbai Municipal Corporation. Stalls line the street from the gate at the bottom of the steps all the way to the old 'September Garden' located in the Mount Carmel Church compound, which is the tail end of the fair.

== Complaints ==
Recently, there have been many issues raised by the residents residing on the Mount Mary Road in Bandra where the Fair takes place. Some residents have complained that all the public transport is reserved for pilgrims during the fair, leaving the nearby residents with no transport. Due to large scale cooking on the roads, some residents have complained of pollution, while many have complained that mosquitoes increase in number during the fair. Also, nearby dental clinics and dispensaries on Mount Mary Road prefer to remain closed during the fair.

== Popularity ==
The Bandra Fair is very popular in Mumbai. Every year, different political parties set up their political banners across the suburb of Bandra inviting the pilgrims to the Fair. The Bandra Fair as known as Monti Saibini-che Fest in Konkani vernacular, is also popular outside India especially with the Indian Catholic diaspora. A similar event called the "Bandra Feast" is organized annually by the India Social and Cultural Centre (ISCC) in Abu Dhabi and Bahrain.
