= Bandra Government Colony =

The Bandra Government Colony is a locality in the east of Bandra, Mumbai, Maharashtra, India. In 2010, it became a development opportunity with high-rise apartment blocks proposed to replace and augment the current accommodation for government workers currently housed there. In February 2011, allegations of financial impropriety were reported to have possibly compromised DB Realty's participation in the Bandra Government Colony redevelopment.
