= Basilica of Our Lady of the Mount, Bandra =

Church in Archdiocese of Bombay

Mount St Mary Church
- Basilica of Our Lady of the Mount
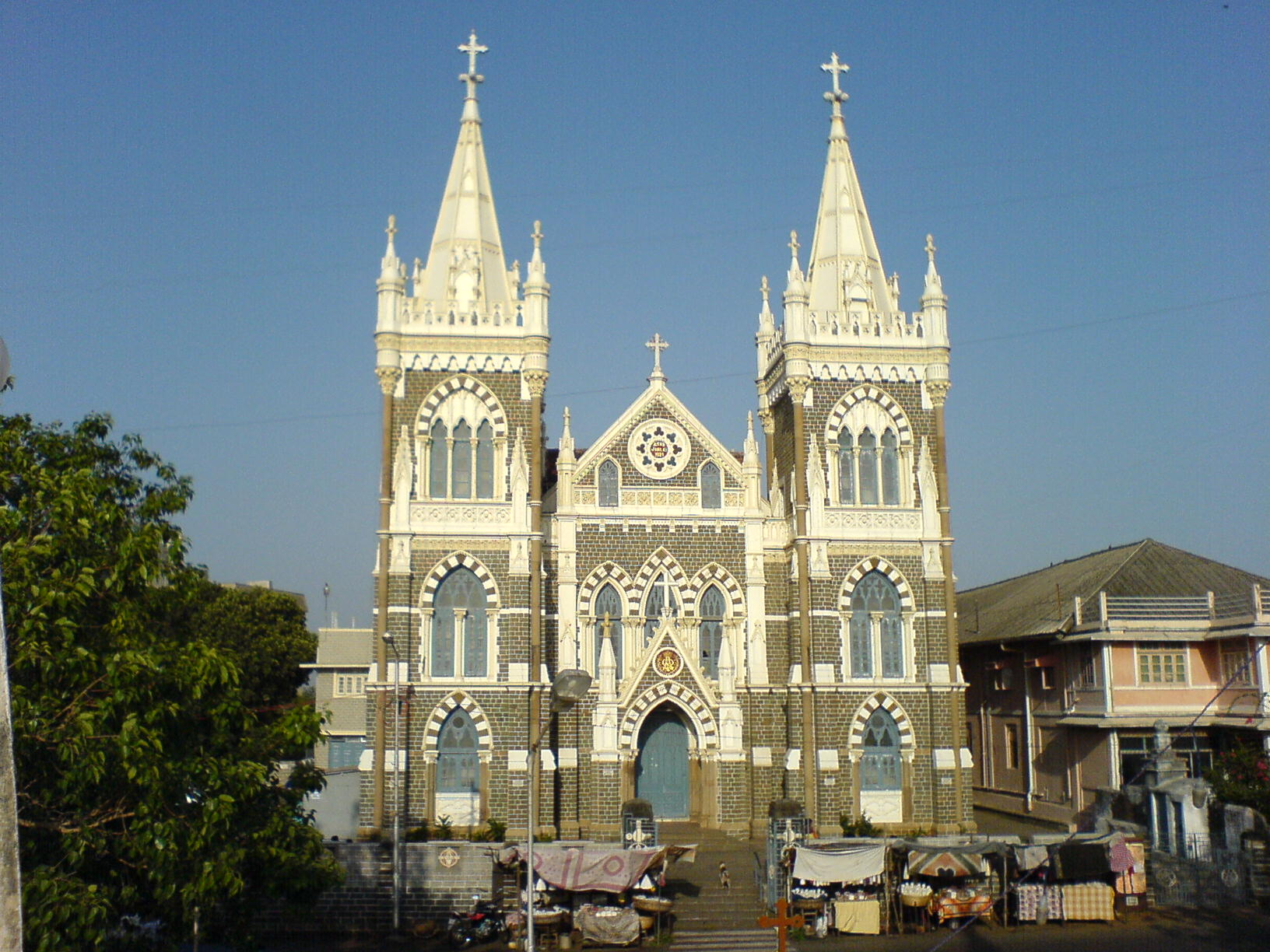
- Mount St Mary Church
- 19°2′48″N 72°49′21″E
- Location: Bandra, Bombay (Mumbai).
- Country: India
- Denomination: Roman Catholic

History
- Status: Minor Basilica
- Dedication: St Mary

Architecture
- Functional status: Active
- Completed: Rebuilt 1904

Administration
- Archdiocese: Archdiocese of Bombay

Clergy
- Archbishop: Cardinal Oswald Gracias
- Rector: Rev Fr Vernon Aguiar

Officially, the Basilica of Our Lady of the Mount, colloquially known as Mount Bandra and Mount St Mary Church; is a basilica (shrine) of the Roman Catholic Church, located at the Bandra neighbourhood of Bombay (Mumbai), India.

The festival of the nativity of St Mary, also known as Holy Marymas or the Bandra Fest, is celebrated here on the 8th day of September: The auspicious occasion of the birth of the virgin-mother of Jesus Christ. The annual feast is followed by a week-long fair or fête, known in the northern Konkan region as the "Bandra fair". The fair is thronged by lakhs of tourists, pilgrims and devotees every year. Many visitors come to Mount St Mary Church in order to make their mannat (wish) come true.

Pope Pius XII granted a decree of canonical coronation to the shrine's reverenced Marian icon on 21 October 1954, both signed and notarised by Cardinal Giovanni Battista Montini of the Sacred Congregation of Rites. The statue of the Madonna and the Prince of peace was crowned in a ceremony on 5 December 1954, by the late Cardinal Valerian Gracias.

== The basilica ==
The basilica stands on a hillock, about 80 metres above sea level overlooking the Arabian Sea. It draws thousands of devotees and pilgrims annually, especially during the Bandra Fest. Many visitors attest to the miracles worked by the supernatural power of St Mary at Mount Bandra. The shrine attracts people from all faiths who plead for favours, with others coming back expressing their gratitude. The church was raided and destroyed in 1738 during the Mahratta Invasion of Bassein, led by the Peshva Brahmin Chimaji Appa. It was rebuilt in the British Bombay era.

During the Bandra Fair, the entire area is decorated with festoons and buntings. Many pitch up stalls to sell religious articles, flowers, snacks and sweets. Wax figures of the Virgin Mary along with an assortment of candles shaped like hands, feet and various other parts of the body are sold at kiosks. The sick and the suffering choose a candle or wax figure that corresponds to their ailment or request and light it inside the church with the hope that Mother Mary will heed their appeals for help.

== Statue of the Virgin Mary ==
A statue of the Virgin Mother Mary of Nazareth (Mothi Saibini in the Bombay East Indian dialect and in the Goan Konkani vernacular) outside Mount St Mary Church, Bandra.

Although the current structure and edifice of the shrine is just 100 years old, as it was rebuilt in British Bombay, the history behind the current statue of Blessed Mary goes back to the 16th century, when Jesuit priests brought the statue and constructed a chapel on Mount Bandra, which was then a part of the Portuguese East Indies. In 1700, Sunni Arab pirates raiding the area, were interested in the gilt-lined object held in the hand & desecrated the statue by cutting off the right hand.

In 1760, the church was rebuilt after the Maratha Invasion of Goa and Bombay ended, following which the statue was substituted with a statue of Our Lady of Navigators from the St Andrew's Church nearby. Legend has it that a Koli Christian fisherman, dreamt of the statue floating in the sea, as prophesied in the dream, the statue was indeed found the next day, floating in the sea. A Jesuit annual letter dated to 1669 and published in the book St Andrew's Church, Bandra (1616–1966) supports this claim. Koli fisherfolk call the statue as Mot Maoli, literally meaning the "Pearl Mother" or "the Mother of the Mount"; mot could be a corruption of the Indo-Portuguese word monte for "mount"; maoli is a Marathi-Konkani word for "mother". The original statue is now restored and is enshrined in a place of honour at the basilica. Bombay East Indians as well as Hindus visit this shrine often, making the place a prominent feature of intercommunal harmony and interfaith dialogue for Mumbai (Bombay).

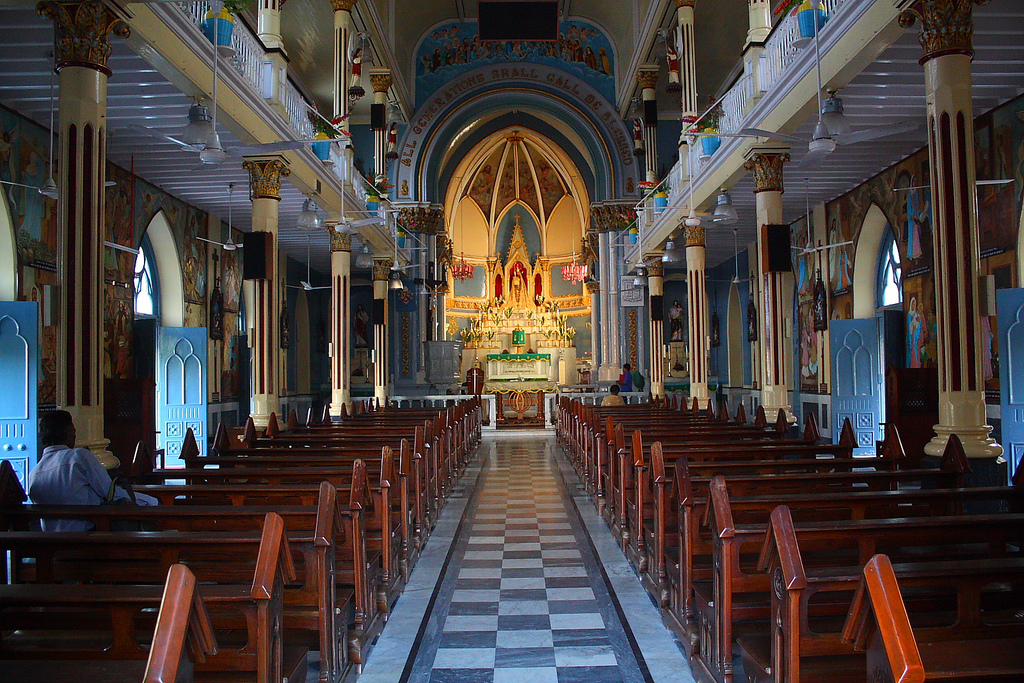
Interior of the church

== See also ==
- Mother Goddess of Christianity
- Weeping Crucifix in Bombay
- Bandra Fest
