= Yantr =

Indian street artist

- యంత్ర్
- Education: Maharaja Sayajirao University of Baroda
- Movement: Street art

Yantr is a pseudonymous graffiti artist from Delhi, India. Yantr is a Sanskrit word that literally means "machine".

== Early life ==
Yantr's real identity is not known. He was raised in Assam where his father owned a garage. He is an Indian artist and designer who introduced contemporary mural art and street art to India. He is an alumnus of Department of Fine Arts, from The Maharaja Sayajirao University of Baroda. Before starting the street art movement, he worked nearly 10 years as an art director in advertising where he worked on global and Indian brands. He has spread the mural art movement all over India such as in Mumbai, Kochi, Himachal Pradesh and Pune.

== Career ==
Yantr was introduced to street art in 2006 and started working in 2008–09. He has traveled across India to paints murals in various cities including Delhi, Guwahati, Pune, and Mumbai. He stenciled a man with notes at different places in Delhi overnight in 2011 to protest against black money. He created Parmanu Muskan, the Buddha wearing a mechanical mask, for creating awareness of environmental issues. He also created an art Heart exchange with Sé Cordeiro in Hauz Khas during 2014 street art festival. He painted a bleeding rhino near Assam Zoo to highlight illegal poaching of rhinos for its horns. He participated in St+Art Mumbai. At Kochi Muziris Biennale, he painted a mechanical giant whale. He also created massive bird by arranging fodder on ground near village in Delhi. During street art festival in 2014, he created a mural of large drone with an eye on the side of five-story building in Shahpur Jat area of Delhi. He aims to bring complex topics to the general public through street art. His work combines machinery and natural forms, utilizing his unique style. He was also a part of St+art Delhi 2014 and the first Street Art exhibition in India - "This is Not Street Art". He also participated in 18 Degrees Festival in October 2014 and painted murals in Shillong. During street art festival in Mumbai, Ranjit Dahiya and he partnered to paint India’s largest mural, depicting the father of Indian cinema, Dadasaheb Phalke. He also painted a simple wall with a window into a dream sequence which later featured in home and design trends magazine. In 2015, he created promotional wall arts for Cadbury Oreo biscuits in Delhi. In 2016, he painted India’s tallest mural, 115 feet high water tank, depicting the wildlife conservation named Mission Leopard, in National Capital Region Gurgaon (Now Gurugram). In September 2016, he painted India’s first ever fire station in Pune, depicting the courage and spirit of firemen.

== Style ==
Yantr's style is influenced by his childhood experiences in his father's garage and work in field of arts. His works are an amalgamation of machines, organic forms and art, sometimes called bio-mechanicals, with eclectic themes.
