= Swami Vivekanand Road (Mumbai) =

Major arterial road in Mumbai, India

Route information
- Maintained by Municipal Corporation of Greater Mumbai
- Length: 25 km (16 mi)

Major junctions
- South end: Bandra
- North end: Dahisar

Location
- Country: India
- State: Maharashtra
- Primary destinations: Khar, Mumbai, Santacruz, Vile Parle, Andheri, Jogeshwari, Ram Mandir, Goregaon, Malad, Kandivali, Borivali

Highway system
- Roads in India; Expressways; National; State; Asian; State Highways in Maharashtra

Swami Vivekanand Road, shortened to S.V. Road, is a major arterial road in the western suburbs of the city of Mumbai, India. Swami Vivekanand Road was earlier known as Ghodbunder Road because of being only road parallel to the coast. One can easily find the name, Ghodbunder Road still being used in the electoral roll.
