= Ghanteshwar Temple Mumbai =

Coordinates: 19°04′17″N 72°50′10″E

The Ghanteshwar Temple is a Hindu temple to the god Hanuman in Khar (West), Mumbai, India.

== History ==
A native man named Shri Sakharam Rahate, who had a strong belief in Lord Hanuman, founded this temple in 1960. Thousands of devotees have flocked to the temple over the past 54 years, waiting in line on Tuesdays as well as Saturdays to worship Lord Hanuman, who is renowned for fulfilling the wishes of his followers. The temple sees less crowd on most days of the week, its even more crowded during Hanuman Jayanti.

The temple's unusual name, Ghanteshwar, derives from the fact that it is replete with bells, including bells donated by devotees. People firmly believe that if they pray to the Lord for something and their request is granted, they must contribute a bell here.

Actor Akshay Oberoi went to the Ghanteshwar Hanuman Mandir in Mumbai on 22 April 2016, Hanuman Jayanti, to ask for prayers for his then upcoming movie Laal Rang.
