= Bandra Talao =

Small lake in Bandra, Mumbai, India

- Swami Vivekanand Talao, Motha Sarovar
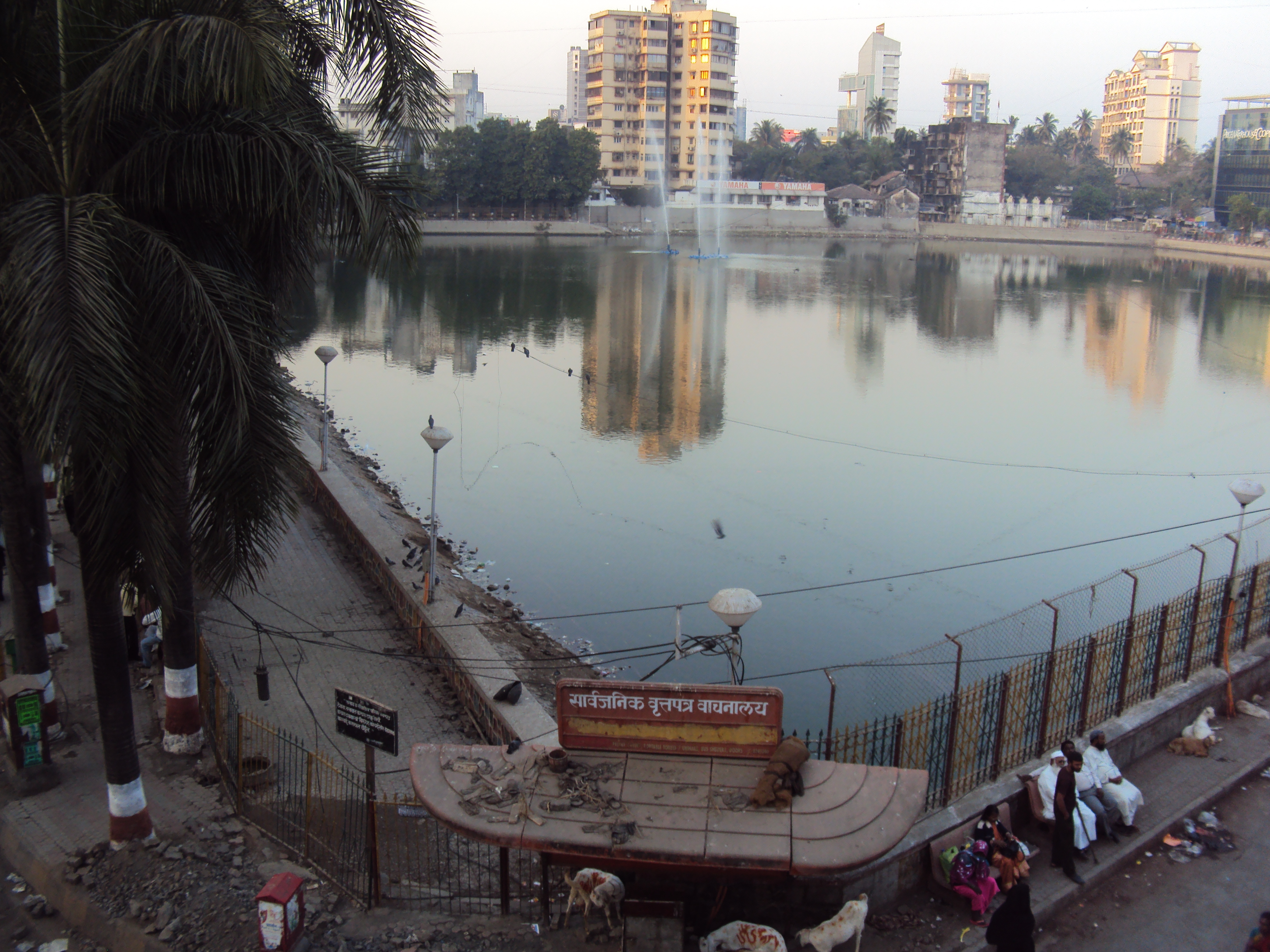
- The lake as viewed from the skywalk

- Location within Mumbai Location within Maharashtra Location within India
- Location: Bandra, Mumbai, Maharashtra
- Coordinates: 19.056424°N 72.838245°E
- Type: artificial
- Surface area: 3.0 hectares (7.5 acres)

Bandra Talao locally referred to as Swami Vivekanand Talao is a small lake located in Bandra, Mumbai. The lake was formerly known as Lotus Tank and is a Grade II heritage structure. it was owned by some unknown Family of Navpada. The lake was also called "Motha Sarovar" and was constructed by an unknown rich Konkani Muslim of Navpada (also spelt Naupada or Naopara) an adjoining village. It is spread across 7.5 acres.

The maintenance of the lake was later turned over to the Municipal Corporation of Greater Mumbai and renamed Swami Vivekanand Sarovar. Paddle boating facilities and pisciculture activities were operational in this lake during the 1990s. It is 200 years old.
