= Khar Danda =

Khar Danda Koliwada Danda Gaothan
- Village
- Nickname: Danda Gaon
- Location in Mumbai, India
- Coordinates: 19.07°N 72.82°E
- Country: India
- State: Maharashtra
- District: Mumbai Suburban
- City: Mumbai

Government
  - Type: Municipal Corporation
  - Body: Brihanmumbai Municipal Corporation (MCGM)

Population
  - Total: 17,583

Languages
  - Official: Koli, East Indian Catholics.
- Time zone: UTC+5:30 (IST)
- PIN: 400052
- Area code: 022
- Civic agency: BMC
- Website: https://khardanda.godaddysites.com/

Khar Danda is a major village on the Salsette Island of Mumbai, India. Located on the north-western coast of Bandra district. It is a fishing village inhabited by the Koli & East Indian Catholics who are also the original inhabitants of the city and suburb of Mumbai. This village is famously known for its quaint fishing business, modern piers, colorful fishing vessels, and traditional homemade soft liquor extracted from fermented fruits known as Sara, in ancient Hindi known as Sura (alcoholic drink).

It is also an eponym for Khar Road. It is one of the oldest settlements in Mumbai and the original inhabitants of Mumbai have been living here for centuries.

Khar Danda is a popular location considered while shooting Bollywood, Hollywood movies and documentaries. Several blockbuster movies have been shot here including Akshay Kumar's Special 26.

== Danda Havli ==
Varin Pada Havli Holi, is one of the first public Hindu festivals ever granted by the British -India government, which was approved on 12th of March, 1922. Before this every year the fishermen's from Khar Danda used to gather wood from Bandra for the annual holi bush fire tradition. But, once due to the lack of trees available in the Khar and Bandra region they started visiting other nearby villages, which resulted in heated arguments and violent fights between the fishermen's of Khar Danda & the other nearby villagers who accused them for stealing wood from wells and carts. A tale follows that The Goddess Holika appeared to the fishermen and commanded them to always celebrate Holi 2 days prior to the Hindu calendar so that there is sufficient wood available for all. Then Carter Perry Sr, a suburban collector of British was amused to hear this tale and officially gazetted this festival on 12th of March, 1922. Since then Holi is celebrated 2 days before the actual date. Also Mumbai Police is always the guest of honor present to celebrate along with the villagers.

The entire village every year is decorated with lights and diyas, sweets are distributed, and the fishermen and women perform pooja a ritual for their colorful fishing boats.

Reference Reference

== Danda Seaface Promenade ==
The Danda Seaface Promenade, also referred to as the Danda Coastal Road, is a coastal pathway designed for pedestrians and small vehicles. It runs along the boundaries of Khar Danda Koliwada, mostly adjacent to the sea. There are plans underway to extend this coastal road to connect it with the Rustomjee Paramount Building located on 19th Road in Khar.

Once completed, the promenade will stretch from Joggers Park, connecting to the existing Carter Road promenade, and extending towards 19th Road in Khar West.

== History ==
The terms "Khar" (literally "saline land") and "Dande" (literally "sand bars") are mentioned in the 15th-17th century Marathi-language text Mahikavatichi Bakhar.

Bandra has been known to be a natural harbor since ancient times, then called "Bandora". Khar Danda & Chimbai were the only suitable shores for habitation. Chimbai village was a small rocky wetland then and was frequently flooded during monsoons due to being in a low-lying area. The fishermen community hence preferred to settle in Khar Danda. During the Portugal Era, the Portuguese sailors along with the villagers built a beacon on a coral reef near Khar Danda, which is till date battling the sea tides and alerting the fishermen and the sailors about the sea rock's presence in that area, previously named as "Uarashi Reef" and now renamed to "Varashi Reef". The Ministry of Home, Maharashtra government has its office of the regional port officer in Khar Danda. During 1944 Bombay explosion, Khar Danda residents opened doors for around hundreds of people.

A few generations later as the community grew in this Koliwada, the local panchayat Danda Koli Samaj divided the village into small gaothans in order to ease the management. The gaothan were named Dandpada, Madhala pada, Kotpada, Patilpada, Varin Pada & Vetalpada with each gaothan having its own deity. Soon after the Bombay land reclamation progressed Hanuman Nagar & Gulab Nagar were added to the official map of Khar Danda.

== COVID-19 Coronavirus Pandemic ==
In the year 2020, the world was impacted by a pandemic that started in Wuhan, China. This led to countries going into lockdown and cities going shut.

With the help of BMC and Mumbai Police, Khar Danda sealed itself cutting out to others by barricading all entries and exit to the village. This protected the village from spreading of infection. Certain rules and norms have adhered and shops were allowed to open in a specific time bracket.

On 24 July 2020, the BMC declared Khar Danda region as green zone being the first in Mumbai

== See also ==
- Pali Naka
- Khar, Mumbai
