= Sangeet Samrat Naushad Ali Marg =

Walkway in Mumbai, India

Coordinates: 19.0651851°N 72.823235°E

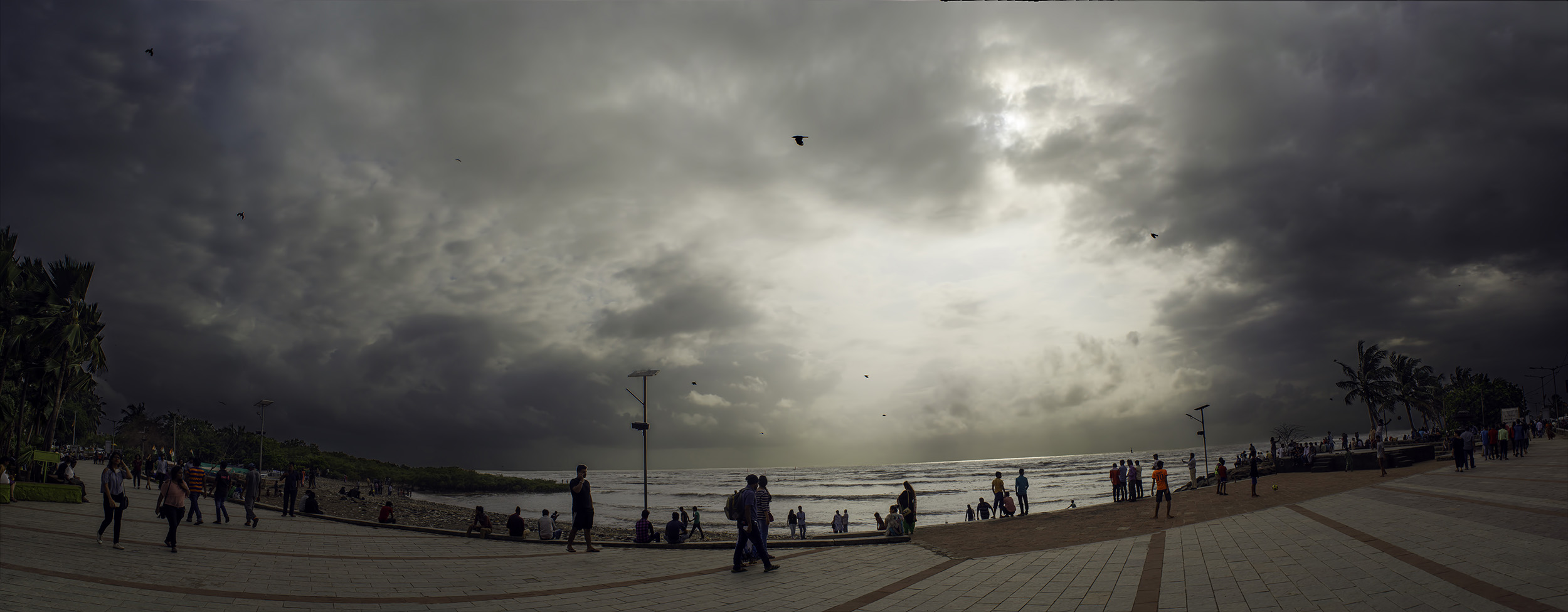
Panoramic view of Carter Road

The Sangeet Samrat Naushad Ali Marg (formerly known as Carter Road Promenade) is a 1.25 kilometres (0.78 mi) long walkway along the Arabian Sea on the western coast of Mumbai, India. This promenade was opened up to the public in January 2002. The promenade has been managed by the Bandra West Residents' Association. The Carter Road Promenade extends up to Khar Danda.

In May 2008, Carter Road was renamed as Sangeet Samrat Naushad Ali Marg, in the memory of Bollywood music director Naushad Ali.

== Geography ==
Carter Road has a sea-facing location connecting Khar Danda in the north with Turner Road, Bandra in the south. The promenade is located along the Arabian Sea on the west-coast of Bandra and Khar. The walkway is 4,800 feet long. The walkway was redeveloped in 2008 as part of the larger movement in Mumbai to reclaim public spaces and to protect Mumbai's coastline.
