= Church of Our Lady of Mount Carmel, Bandra =

Mt. Carmel Church
- Church of Our Lady of Mount Carmel, Bandra
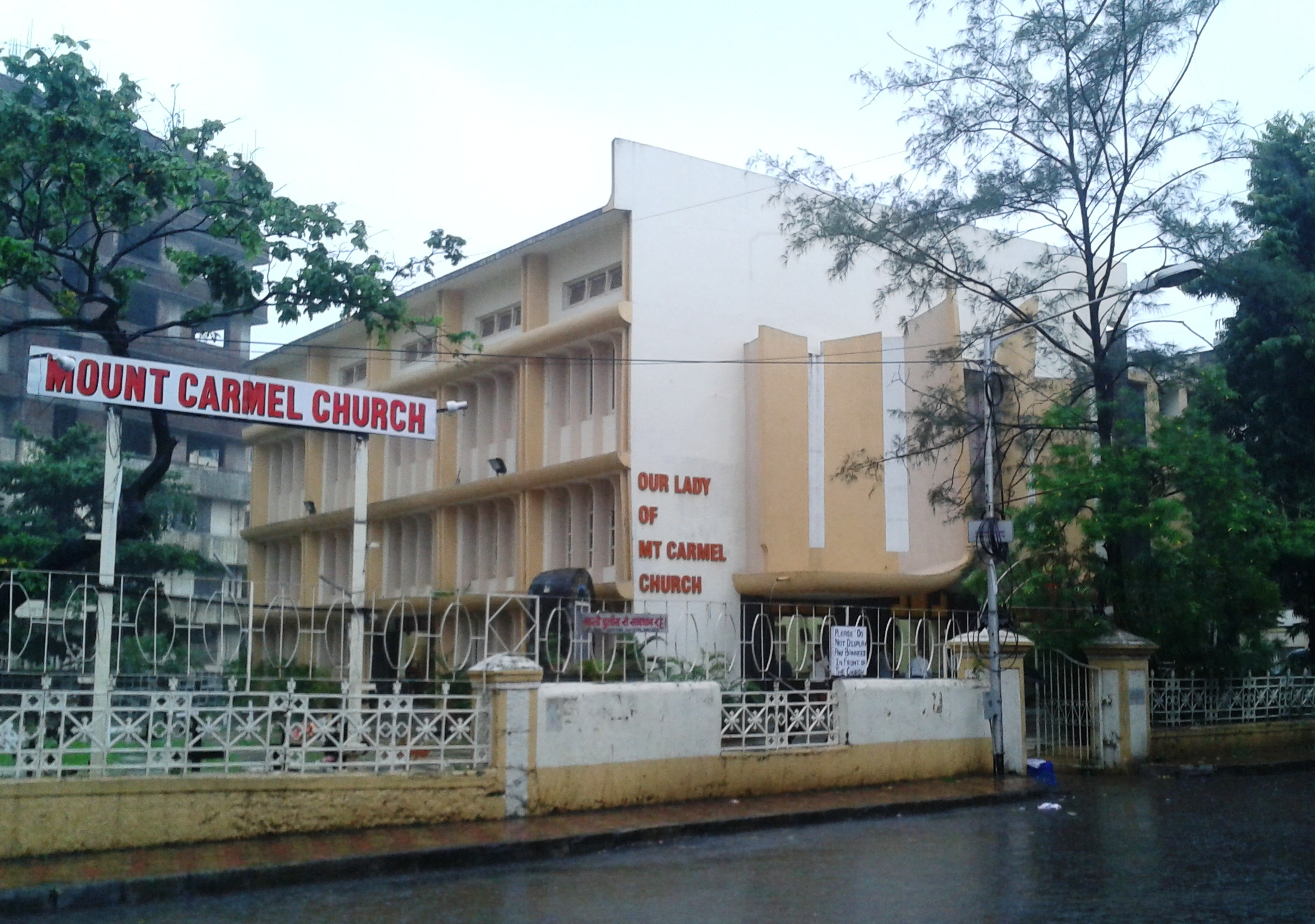
- Mt. Carmel Church
- 19°3′0″N 72°49′41″E
- Location: Bandra, Mumbai
- Country: India
- Denomination: Roman Catholic

History
- Status: Parish Church
- Founded: 1894; 132 years ago

Architecture
- Functional status: Active

Administration
- Archdiocese: Archdiocese of Bombay

Clergy
- Archbishop: Oswald Cardinal Gracias

The Church of Our Lady of Mount Carmel, Bandra is a Roman Catholic church in Bandra, Mumbai. It was built in 1894 by Jesuit Missionaries. As the catholic population in Bandra increased in the latter half of the 20th century, a new modern structure was constructed in its place. The new church was blessed and inaugurated on 11 February 1981 by Archbishop Simon Pimenta, Archbishop of Bombay.

== History ==
The authorities of St Andrew Church and Mount Mary Chapel in Bandra provided land for the erection of the church in 1894 to cater to the 215 families living in the present Chapel Road and Bazaar Road areas that were separated in 1891 from the St Peter Church (then under the Propaganda Jurisdiction) with the permission of the Holy See (Rome). The church was built on the banks of the Mahim creek, opposite the 'Customs House', which still exists today in front of the church, although the creek was reclaimed to form the current Bandra Reclamation locality. The foundation stone was laid on 7 February 1892 by Antonio Pedro Da Costa, Bishop Of Daman, who also blessed the completed church on 1 June 1894. Fr Pio Ellias Saldanha was the first parish priest of the church. The need for a new and larger church was felt in the 1960s as more Catholics had moved into the area and in 1975, Cardinal Valerian Gracias, Archbishop of Bombay, laid the foundation stone of the new church building.

== Structure ==
=== Original church ===
The main altar of the original church was obtained from one of the ancient, ruined churches of Diu. The original parishioners who were fisher folk contributed towards the building of the church, transporting stones and other construction materials in their fishing boats to the building site.

=== The new church ===
The new church was constructed in keeping with the post–conciliar spirit of the Second Vatican Council. For example, the sanctuary is not separated from the body of the church by communion rails, which was a feature in older churches. It is characterized by an absence of clutter and is well-ventilated. The rough and rustic stone backdrop of the sanctuary provides a background for the large cross and crucifix which has been carved from a single tree. The altar table and lectern have a geometrical design with slender proportions, constructed of black and ruby-red granite, with the top of the altar made from a single block of granite. There is no statue in the sanctuary apart from the large crucifix and there are relatively few other statues in the church.

The cantilevered canopy at the entrance of the church is designed to symbolize two hands joined in prayer, with a cross in the centre. The church's large windows that provide cross ventilation have vertical R.C.C. fins between them that act as sun- breakers, giving the church exterior a unique appearance. The architect of the new church was a parishioner, Charles F. Sobrinho.

== See also ==
- Gloria Church
