= Pali Naka =

Area in Bandra-Khar

Coordinates: 19.062742°N 72.829396°E

Pali Naka is an area in Bandra-Khar. The Pali Hill locality is famous as the residence of several Bollywood film stars.

Pali Naka is synonymous with Pali Market - a bustling energetic bazaar at the foot of Pali Hill. It is dotted with several vegetable hawkers selling exotic and regular vegetables, Jude Bakery - an old bread & eggs store which has been around for years, general provisions stores, wine shops, furniture stores, key makers and chemists. There is also a small police station at Pali Naka.

This part of Mumbai also draws a lot of expatriates and the stores at Pali Naka. There are several restaurants and pubs frequented by the locals and migrant population of Mumbai.

== See also ==
- Pali Hill
