= Khar, Mumbai =

Khar
- suburb
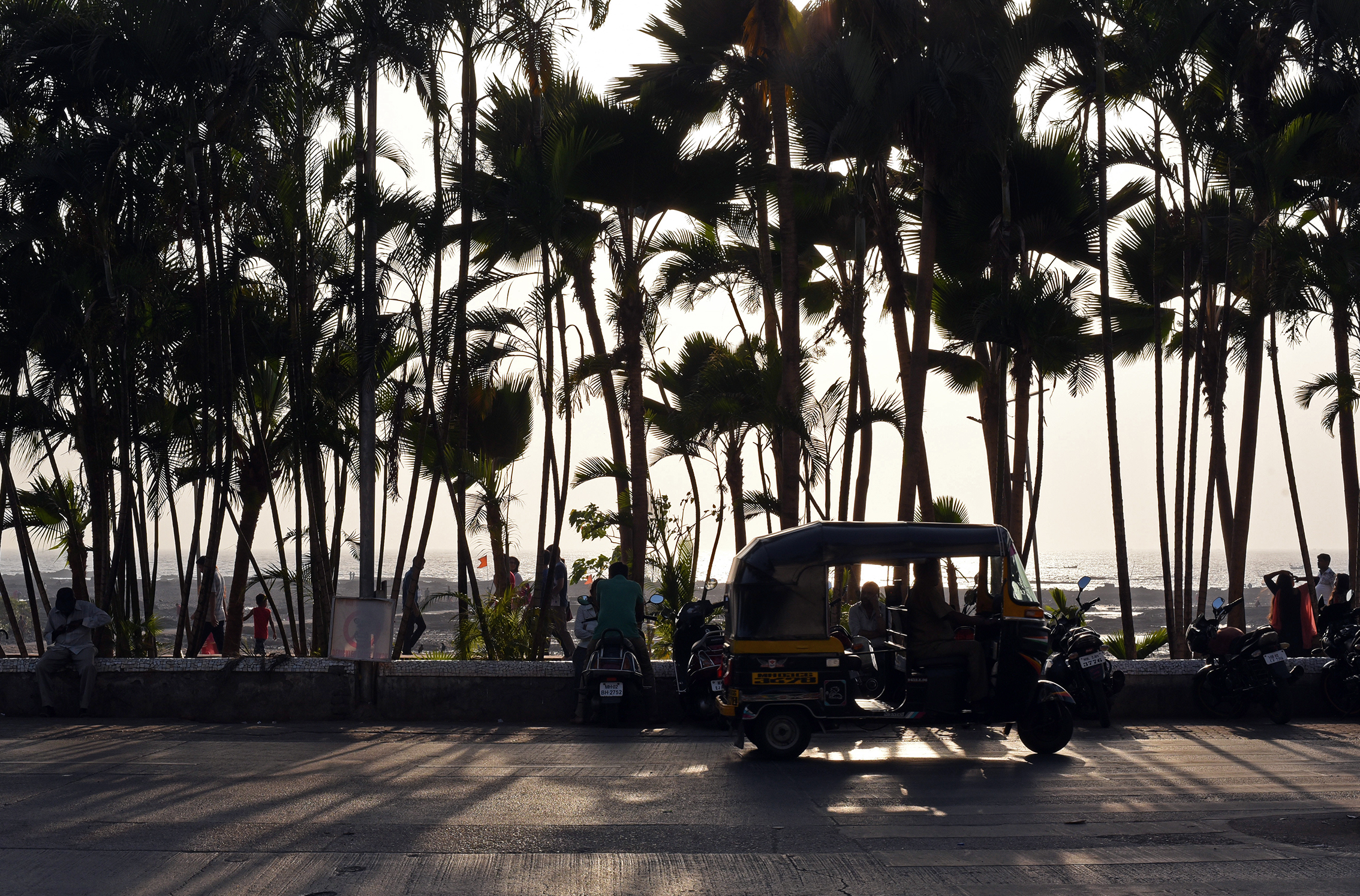
- Northern end of the Carter Road Promenade at Khar West

- Location within Mumbai Location within Maharashtra Location within India
- Coordinates: 19°04′N 72°50′E
- Country: India
- State: Maharashtra
- District: Mumbai Suburban
- City: Mumbai

Government
  - Type: Municipal Corporation
  - Body: Brihanmumbai Municipal Corporation (MCGM)

Languages
  - Official: Marathi
- Time zone: UTC+5:30 (IST)
- PIN: 400052
- Area code: 022
- Civic agency: BMC

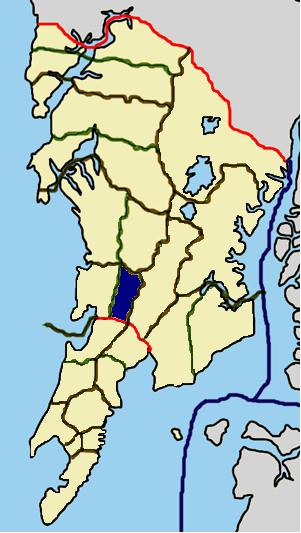
Location of Khar-Santa Cruz in Mumbai.

Khar (Marathi pronunciation: [kʰaːɾ]) is an affluent suburb of Mumbai, north of Bandra and south of Santacruz, Mumbai. Originally one of the 'villages' that made up the larger Bandra, the present suburb is divided into Khar West and Khar East areas. It is serviced by Khar Road railway station of the Mumbai Suburban Railway network. It is an area within convenient distances of several schools, restaurants, parks, promenades and shopping centres. Khar bears the Mumbai Postal Index Number (Pin Code) 400052.

Khar, which is derived from the word Khāra (meaning 'salty' in the local language Marathi) has acquired this name in reference to the salt pans that were used to farm salt by locals near the Khar Danda sea shore a couple of centuries ago. Here, one also finds the historic fishing village of "Khar Danda", which is one of the villages that made up the original Bandra area and is also one of the oldest settlements of Mumbai.

== History ==
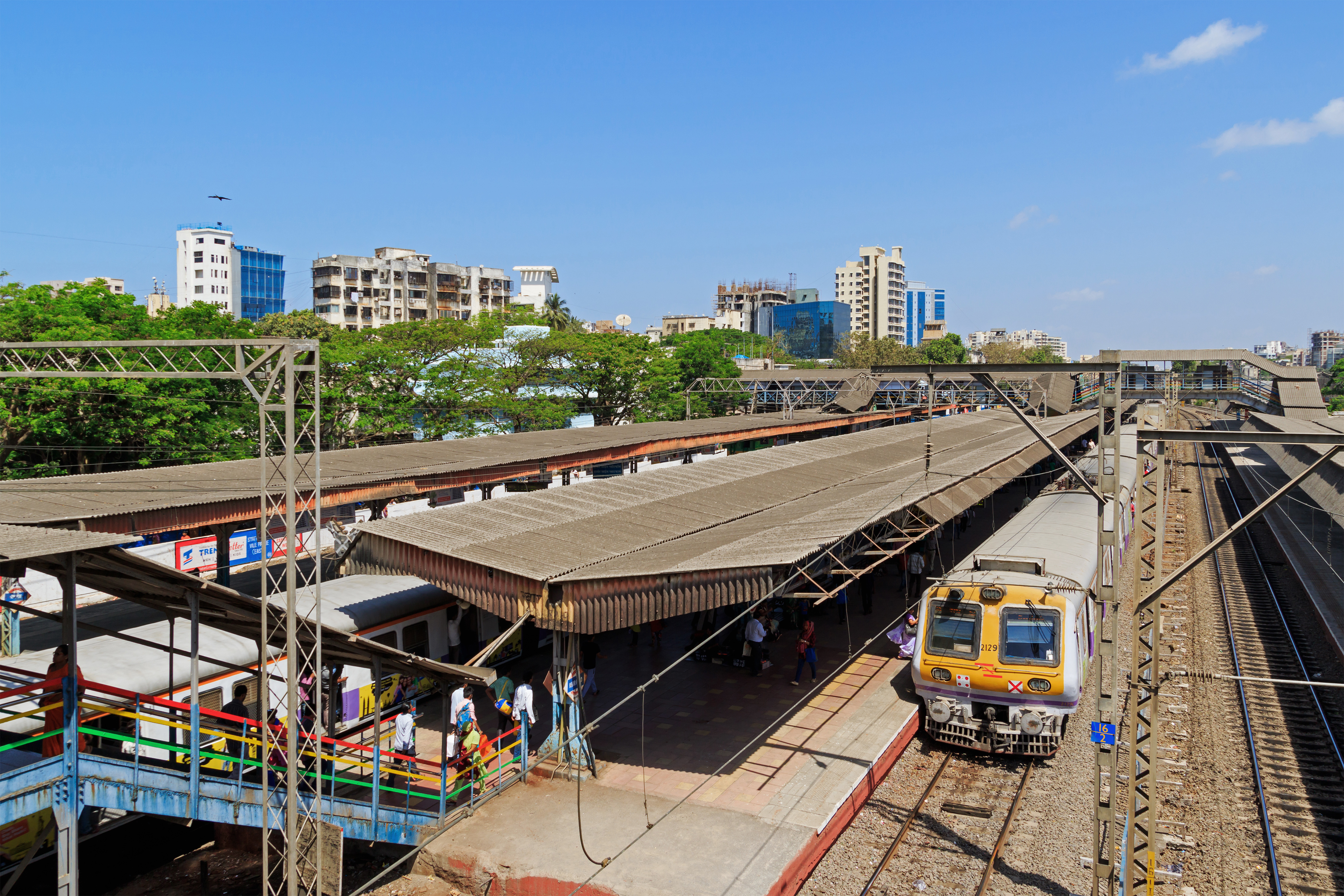
Khar Road station

Most of the historic Khar area of Bandra was a marshland of salty sea water. Alongside fishing, salt production was one of the vocations that sustained the earliest dwellers of Khar Danda.

Pathare Prabhus were one of the earliest inhabitants of Khar, from almost a century and half ago. In the early 1900s, the Pathare Prabhu community lived in South Mumbai and used their quaint bungalows in Khar as weekend dwellings. Khar Danda was one of the original villages of the erstwhile larger Bandra. Back then, the local Bandra railway station was felt distant to alight from trains and hire 'tangas' (horse carriages) to get to these bungalows in the Khar part of Bandra. Keeping these factors in mind, as well as the growing number of homes in this part, a second railway station named 'Khar Road' was introduced in north Bandra on 1 July 1924. This development is the primary reason for Khar to start being spoken of as a suburb by itself. The Pathare Prabhu community still has land ownership over a large area of Bandra/Khar.

== Schools and colleges ==
- Guru Nanak Mission High School

== Religious places ==
- Ghanteshwar Temple Mumbai, Khar west

== Medical facilities ==
- Hinduja Healthcare Surgical

== Notable residents ==
- Asha Bhosle, Indian playback singer
- Anu Malik, Indian music director
- Gulzar, Indian Urdu poet and lyricist
- S. D. Burman, Indian musician
- Suman Kalyanpur, Indian playback singer
- R.D.Burman, Indian music director
- Tiger Shroff, Indian actor
- Diljit Dosanjh, Indian singer

== See also ==
- Pali Naka
- Khar Danda
