= List of forts in Mumbai =

The following is a list of forts in Mumbai.

== List ==
Name (other names)	Image	Built in	Built by	Locality	District	Type	Purpose	Razed (by)	Current status	Current owner	Coordinates	Ref
Bombay Castle: Casa da Orta; Manor House; Governor House; INS Angre	Unavailable	1554	Portuguese	Fort area	Mumbai City	Land battery	Administration	–	Preserved	Indian Navy	18.93111°N 72.83750°E	
Castella de Aguada: Bandra Fort		1640	Portuguese	Bandra	Mumbai Suburban	Land battery	Watchtower, freshwater source	–	Under renovation	ASI	19.04177°N 72.81858°E	
Dongri Fort: Dungarey Fort	Unavailable	1596	Portuguese	Dongri	Mumbai City	Hill fort	Defensive	1769 (British)	Demolished	N/A	18.94090°N 72.83759°E	
Fort George		1770	British	Dongri	Mumbai City	Defensive	Defensive	1862 (British)	Remnants	Government of Maharashtra	18.94090°N 72.83759°E	
Riwa Fort: Kala Killa; Dharavi Fort		1737	British	Dharavi	Mumbai City	Land battery	Watchtower	–	Dilapidated	ASI	19.0509°N 72.86006°E	
Madh Fort: Versorva Fort		17th century	Portuguese	Madh Island	Mumbai Suburban	Land battery	Watchtower, prison	–	Stable	ASI	19.132283°N 72.794785°E	
Mahim Fort		13th century	Bhimdev	Mahim	Mumbai City	Land battery	Watchtower, defensive	–	Dilapidated	Government of Maharashtra	19.039848°N 72.837768°E	
Mazagon Fort	Unavailable	1680	British	Mazagon	Mumbai City	Land battery	Watchtower	1690 (Yakut Khan)	Demolished	MCGM	18.965633°N 72.842703°E	
Sion Fort: Sion Hillock Fort		1669	British	Sion	Mumbai City	Hill fort	Watchtower	–	Dilapidated	ASI	19.046583°N 72.867483°E	
Sewri Fort: Sewree Fort		1680	British	Sewri	Mumbai City	Hill fort (also Land battery)	Watchtower	–	Under renovation	ASI	19.000635°N 72.860363°E	
Worli Fort: Worlee Fort		1675	British	Worli	Mumbai City	Land battery	Watchtower	–	Dilapidated	ASI	19.023732°N 72.816621°E	

== See also ==
- Bassein Fort
- Belapur Fort
- List of forts in Maharashtra
