= Shitaladevi Mandir metro station =

Mumbai Metro's Aqua Line metro station

Shitala Devi Mandir
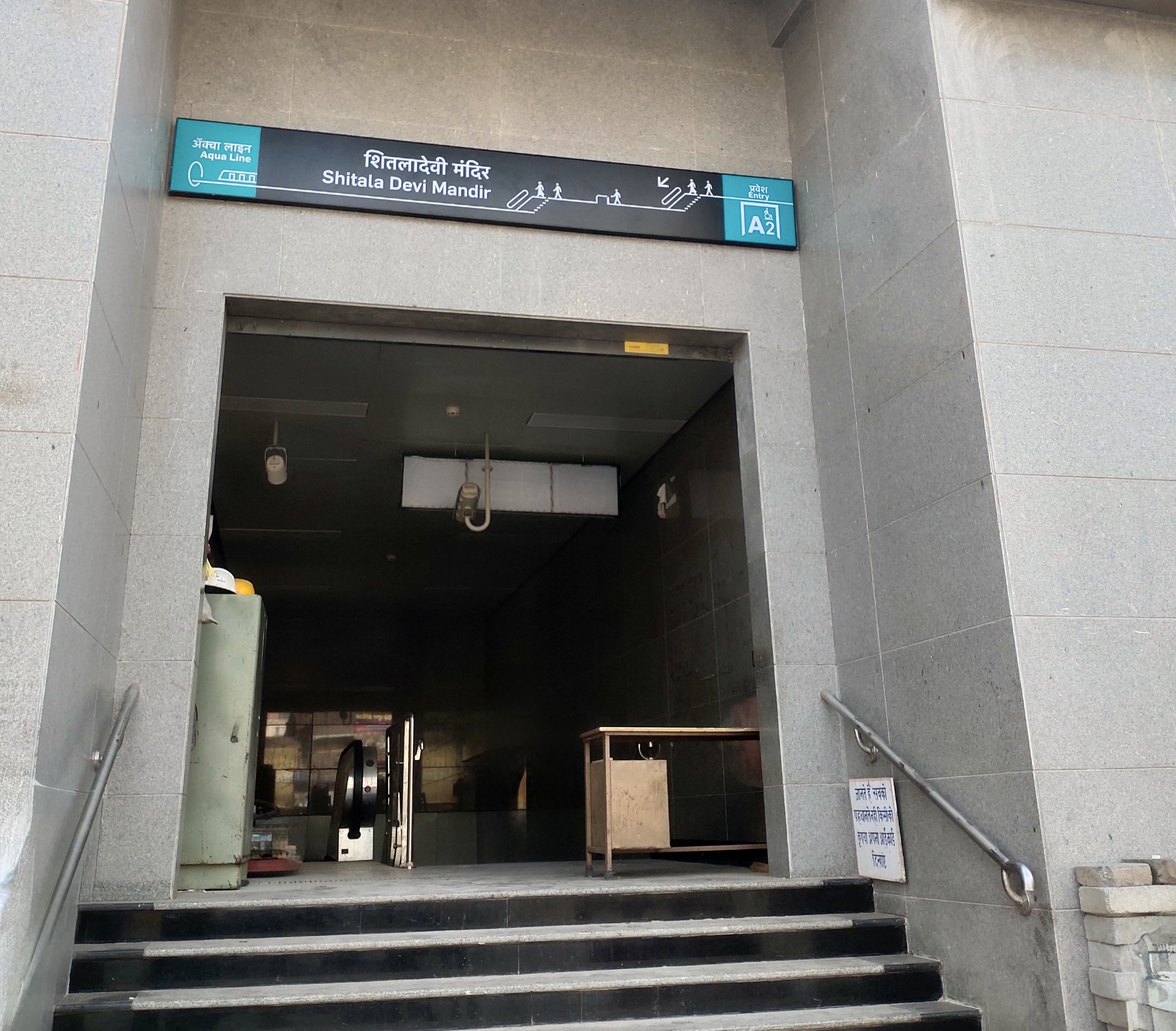
- Entrance/exit A2 of the station

General information
- Location: Lady Jamshedji Rd, Wanjawadi, Mahim West, Mahim, Mumbai, Maharashtra 400016
- Coordinates: 19°02′18″N 72°50′32″E
- Owner: Mumbai Metro Rail Corporation Ltd.
- Operator: Delhi Metro Rail Corporation
- Line: Line 3
- Platforms: 1 island platform

Construction
- Structure type: Underground

Other information
- Status: Staffed, Operational
- Station code: SDIT

History
- Opened: 10 May 2025; 17 months ago

Services
Preceding station	Mumbai Metro	Following station
Dadar towards Cuffe Parade	Line 3	Dharavi towards Aarey JVLR
Track layout
Location

Shitaladevi Mandir is an underground metro station serving area Wanjawadi area of Mahim in Mumbai on the north–south corridor of the Aqua Line 3 of Mumbai Metro in Mumbai, India. It was opened to public on 10 May 2025.

== Station Layout ==
G	Ground level	Exit/Entrance
L1	Concourse	Customer Service, Shops, Vending machine, ATMs
L2; Platforms	Platform 2	Towards Aarey JVLR (Dharavi) →
L2; Platforms	Island platform
L2; Platforms	Entrance/exit vestibule
L2; Platforms	Island platform
L2; Platforms	Platform 1	← Towards Cuffe Parade (Dadar)

== Entry/Exit ==
- A1 - P.D. Hinduja Hospital, Shree Shitaladevi Temple
- A2 - Paradise E.Square, Mahim Railway Station
- B1 - Hazrat Fakhruddin Shah Baba Dargah, Wanjewadi
- B2 - Hazrat Makhdoom Shah Baba Dargah, Mahim Fort
- B3 - Mahim Junction railway station, St. Michael's Church

== See also ==
- Mumbai
- Transport in Mumbai
- List of Mumbai Metro stations
- List of rapid transit systems in India
- List of metro systems
