= Land's End, Bandra =

Land's End
- Neighbourhood
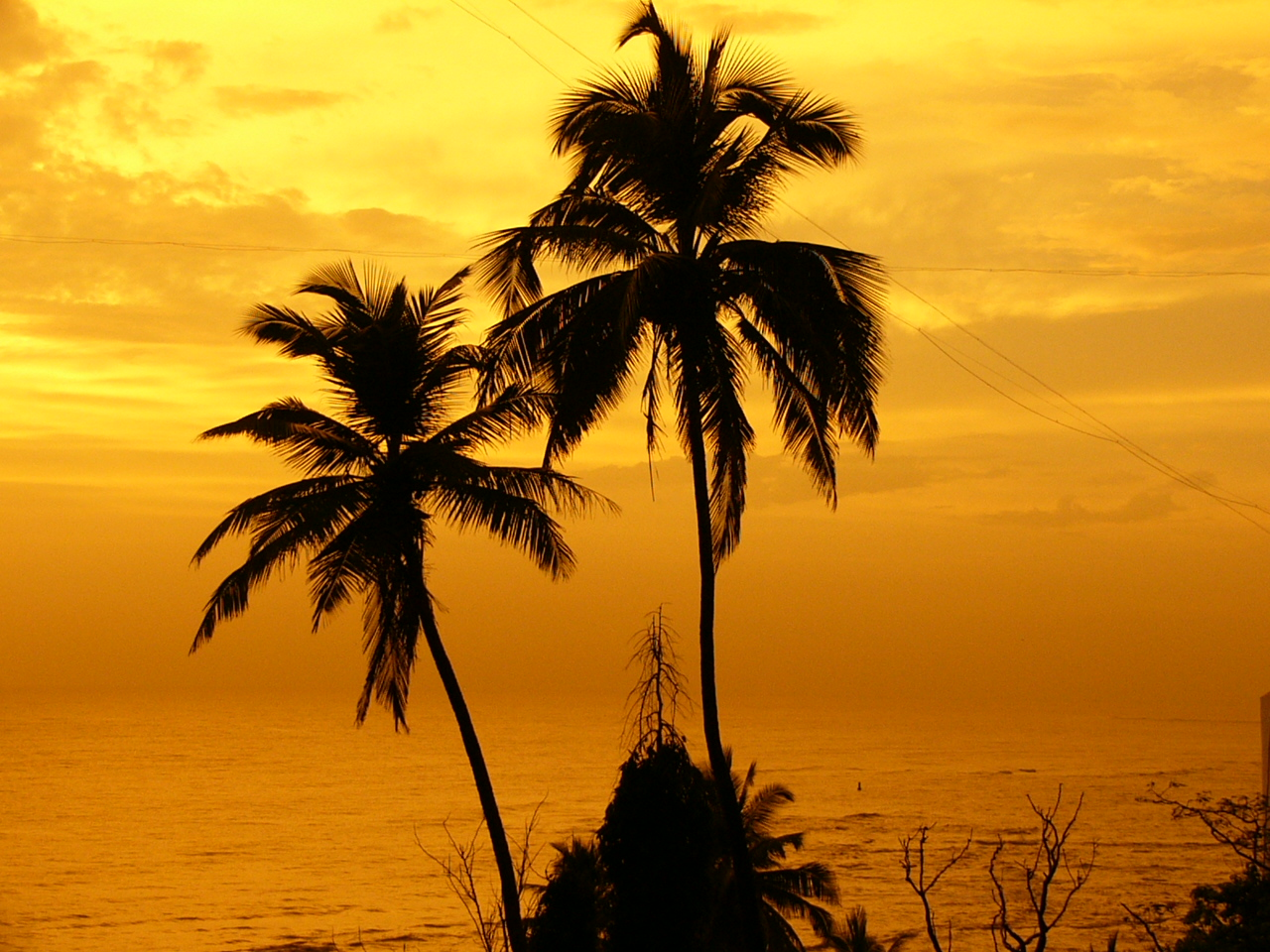
- Sunset at Land's End
- Country: India
- State: Maharashtra
- District: Mumbai Suburban
- City: Mumbai

Government
  - Type: Municipal Corporation
  - Body: Brihanmumbai Municipal Corporation (MCGM)

Languages
  - Official: Marathi
- Time zone: UTC+5:30 (IST)
- PIN: 400050
- Area code: 022
- Civic agency: BMC

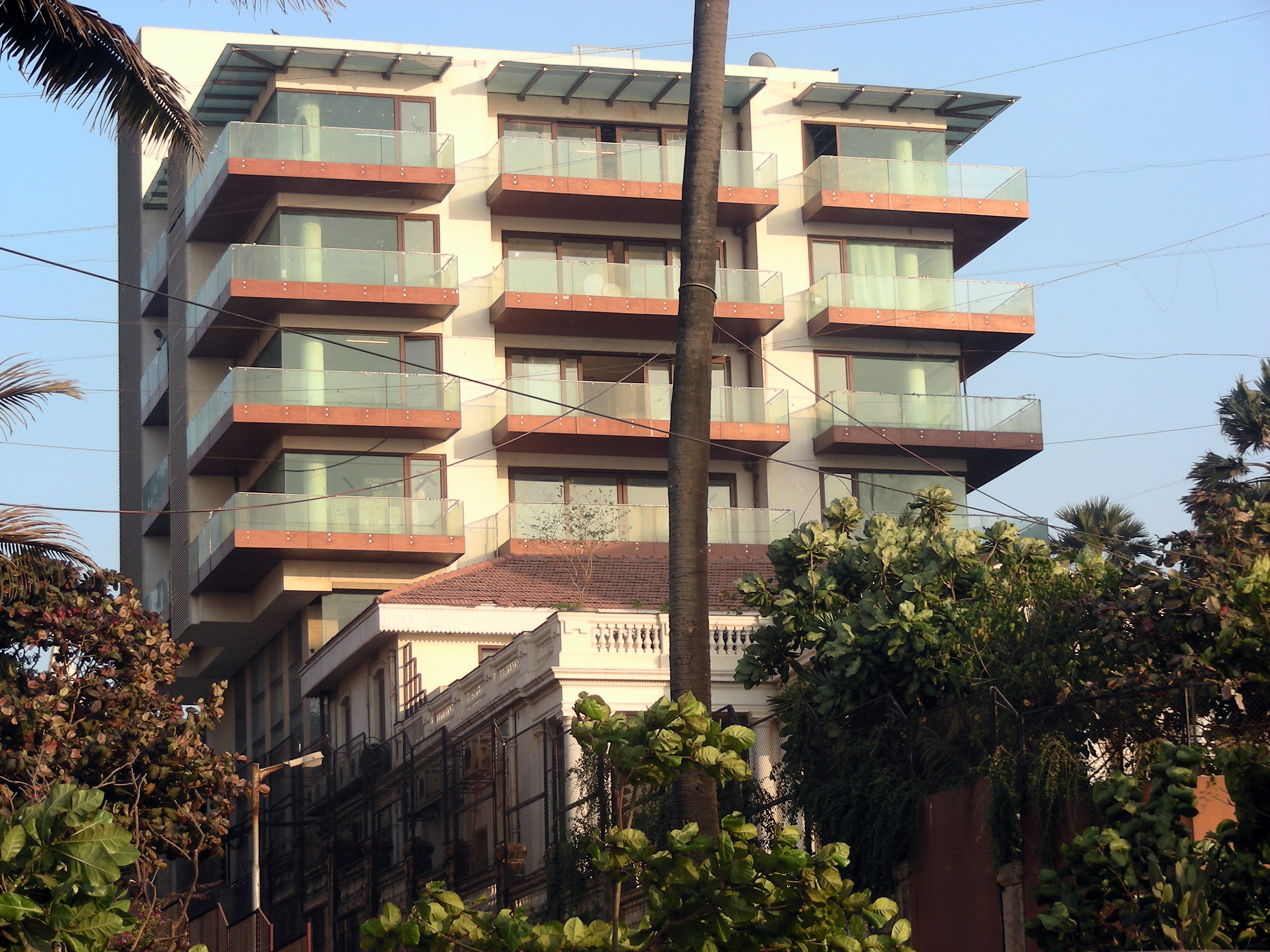
Shahrukh Khan's residence at Land's end

Lands End is the southernmost tip of Bandra in Mumbai. The area is notable for being the residence of several Bollywood actors. It is an upmarket area in Mumbai and the properties in this area is one of the most expensive properties in the world. Notable residents include Shahrukh Khan.

== Location ==
Lands End is a peninsular strip of land that juts into the Arabian Sea, with a fort at its tip and a hill that comes below the fort's vista.

== History ==
In 1640, the Portuguese built a fort known as Castella de Aguada (Portuguese: Fort of the Waterpoint, also known as the Bandra Fort). It was built to serve as a watchtower overlooking Mahim Bay, the Arabian Sea, and the southern island of Mahim.

In 1850, a Parsi businessman and philanthropist, Sir Byramjee Jeejeebhoy, bought the entire area of Land's End. Byramjee spent his personal fortune to develop the area. He built a road connecting Lands End with the rest of Bandra. This road is known as Byramjee Jeejeebhoy Road. He also built a promenade and a sea-facing wall on the western side of Lands End. In 1865, Byramjee built his residence on top of the hill at Lands End. He lived in this house along with his son, Nanabhoy Jeejeebhoy, (who founded Nana Chowk).
