= Mahim Junction railway station =

Railway Station in Maharashtra, India

Mahim Junction

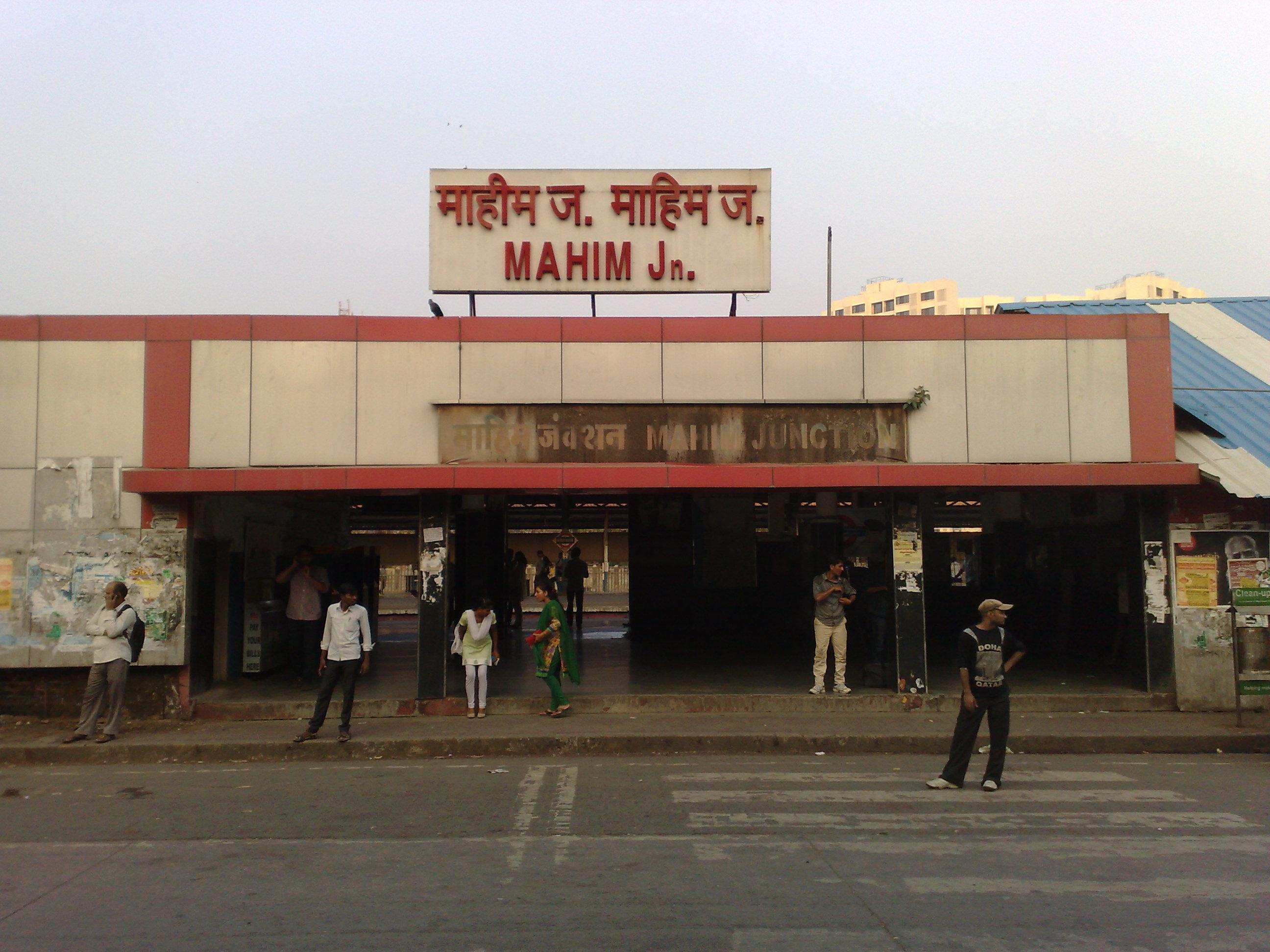

General information
- Coordinates: 19°2′26″N 72°50′49″E
- System: Mumbai Suburban Railway station
- Owner: Ministry of Railways, Indian Railways
- Lines: Western Line, Harbour Line
- Platforms: 6
- Tracks: 6

Construction
- Structure type: Standard on-ground station
- Parking: No

Other information
- Status: Active
- Station code: MM
- Fare zone: Western Railway zone

Passengers
- 2012-13: 1,22,939

Services
Preceding station	Mumbai Suburban Railway	Following station
Matunga Road towards Churchgate	Western line	Bandra towards Dahanu Road
King's Circle towards Chhatrapati Shivaji Terminus	Harbour line	Bandra towards Goregaon
Route map
Location
- Location within Mumbai

Mahim Junction (Marathi pronunciation: [maːˈɦiːm]; station code: MM) is an Indian railway station on the Western line and Harbour Line of the Mumbai Suburban Railway network. It serves the last town of the Mumbai City district, Mahim.

== History ==
The original Mahim station belonged to the GIP Railway (today's Central Railway), and the company began services to the station all the way back in 1853, when it started India's first passenger train service from Bori Bunder (in Bombay) to Tannah (now, Thane). The original station was located near the Mandvi (Custom House), near where the Mahim Causeway starts. There were two routes: one from Bori Bunder to Tannah, and the other from Bori Bunder to Mahim. The Mahim route diverged from the main line only near Sion, with the only intermediate station being Byculla. It took 40 mins to travel each way by the service. It was speculated in a report, that the railways would transform Mahim from a simple fishing village, to a port of importance.

During times of water crisis, the GIPR would run water trains. In fact a separate water committee was formed. A joint venture was proposed by the committee in 1855 with GIP Railway. This would help create a wooden reservoir at Mahim station. Water would be drawn from tanks at Mahim, and poured in this reservoir. It could hold enough water to fill one train, with each train carrying an average of 10,000 gallons (37854.12 L). 24 water trains ran between Bombay and other localities in the time frame between 2 and 9 June 1854 to bring in water to the city. Of this, 21 had run to and fro from Mahim.

A different Mahim Road station was opened between August and October 1853. This was renamed as Dadar station on 1 October 1856.

The Mahim station of GIPR was closed along with the branch line on 1 June 1869, and the second Mahim station was built later by the BB&CI Railway (today's Western Railway) which arrived in the city in that very decade. The first station building was completed in 1869. Much later, the Mahim-Wadala Link to the Bombay Port Trust Railway was opened on 11 August 1914.

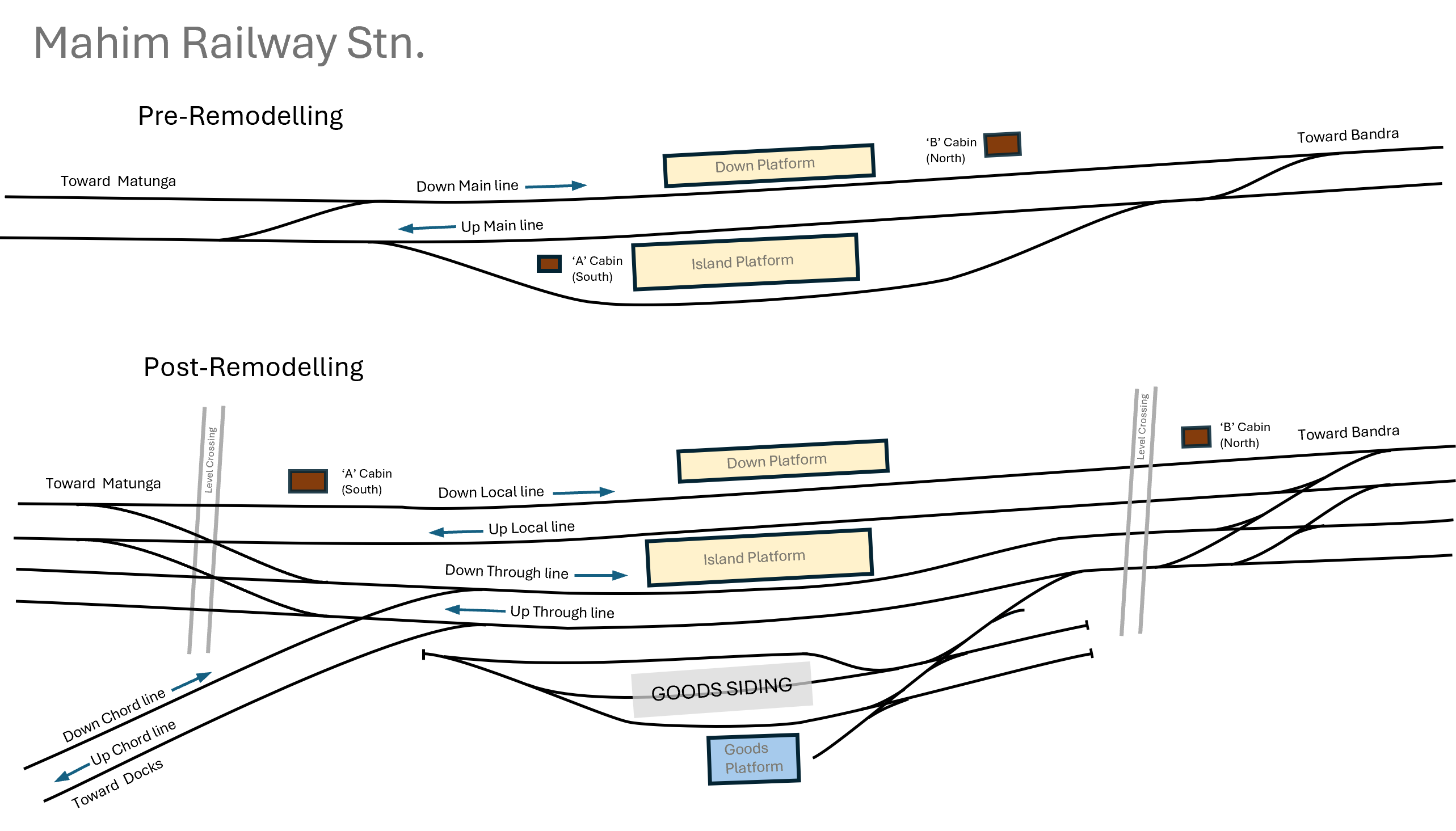
Diagrams of Mahim Junction Station remodeling scheme (British era)

After this, tracks between Mahim and Bandra station were quadrupled, opening to freight traffic in May 1917, and to passenger traffic in October 1920. In March 1922, in an effort to relieve local tracks between Mahim and Dadar station, the intermediate tracks too were quadrupled. Further, to suffice the demand for better local service, tracks between Parel North Cabin and Mahim were quadrupled temporarily, opening for passenger traffic in May 1922. With all this, the two platform Mahim station, consisting of just two up-down main lines, and another branching line beside the Island platform, turned into a large station with four lines, and even goods sidings.

== Gallery ==
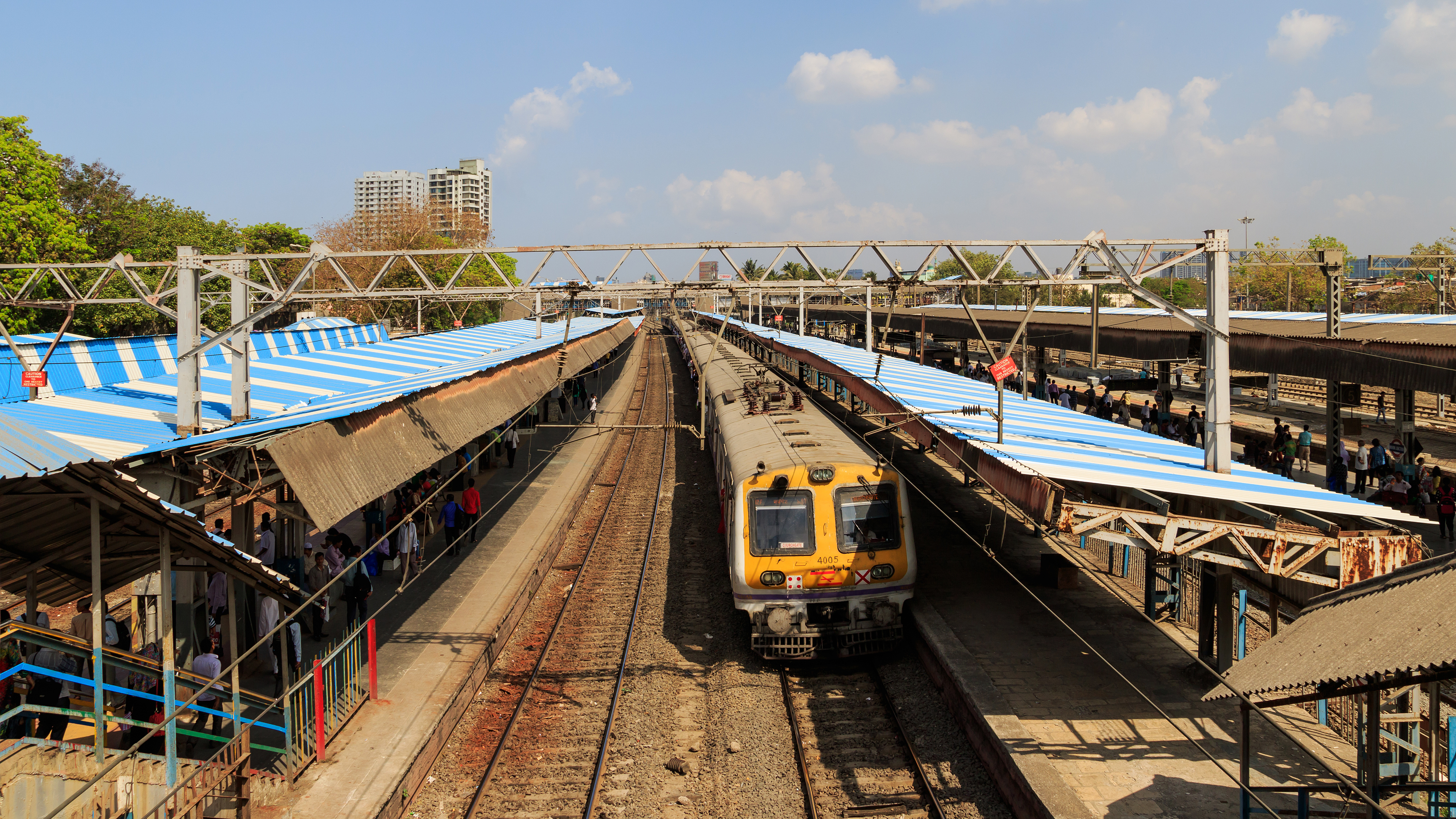
View from footbridge

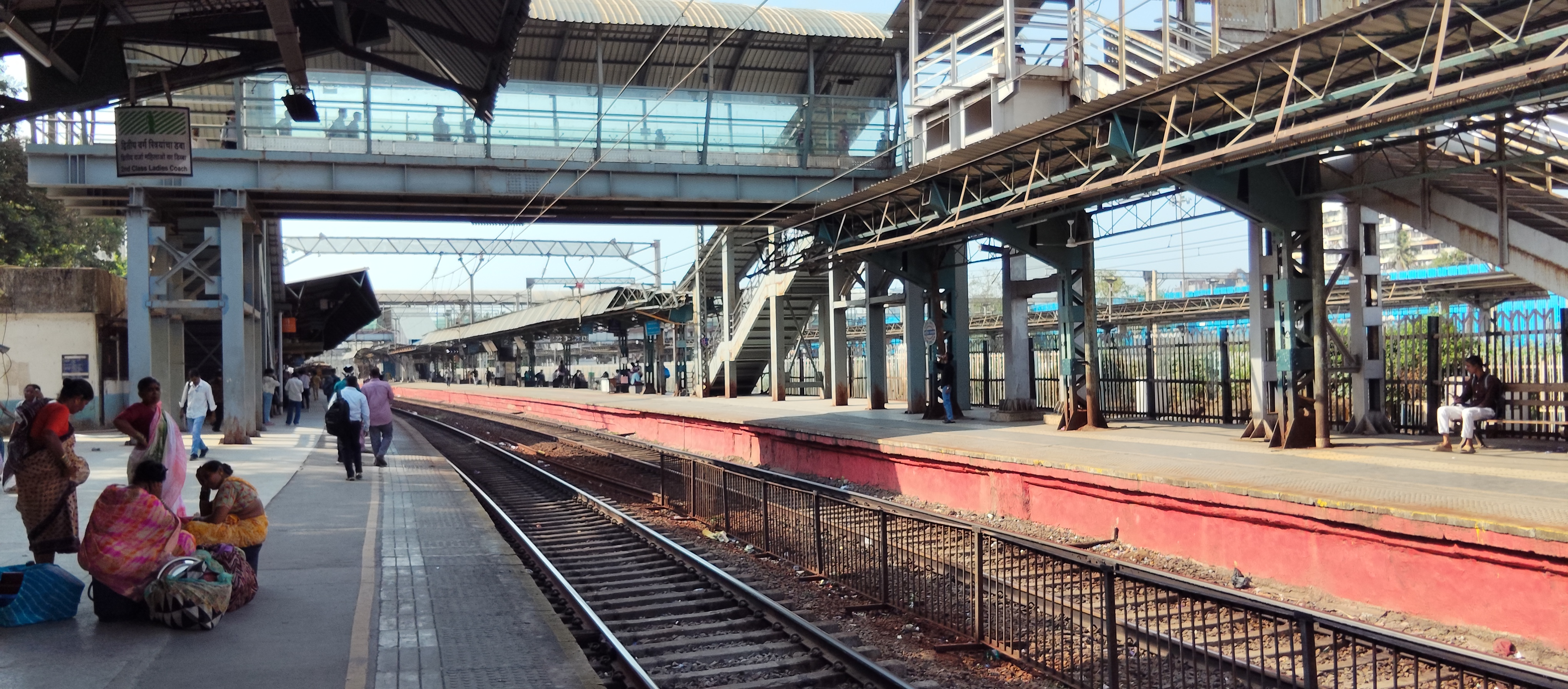
Mahim station- Northward view from Platform 1

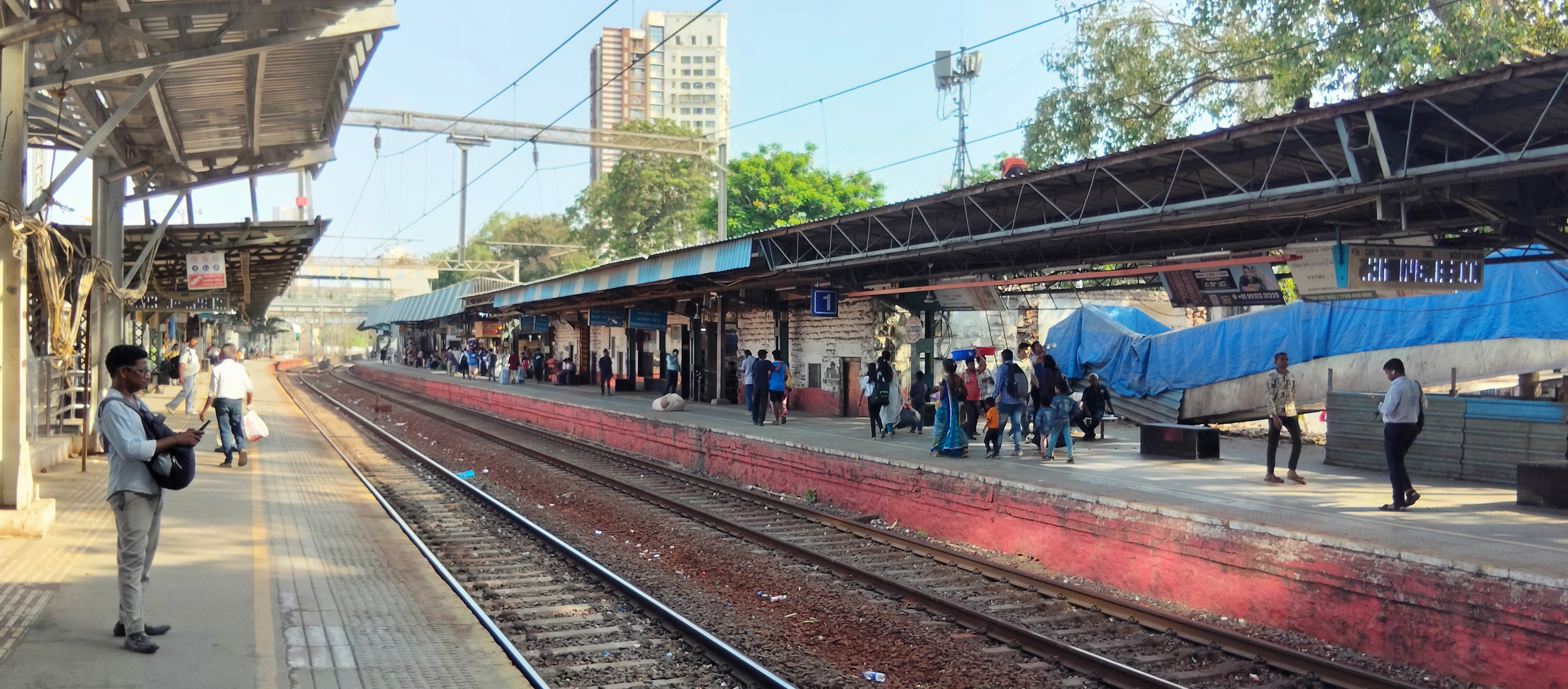
Mahim station- Southward view from Platform 2

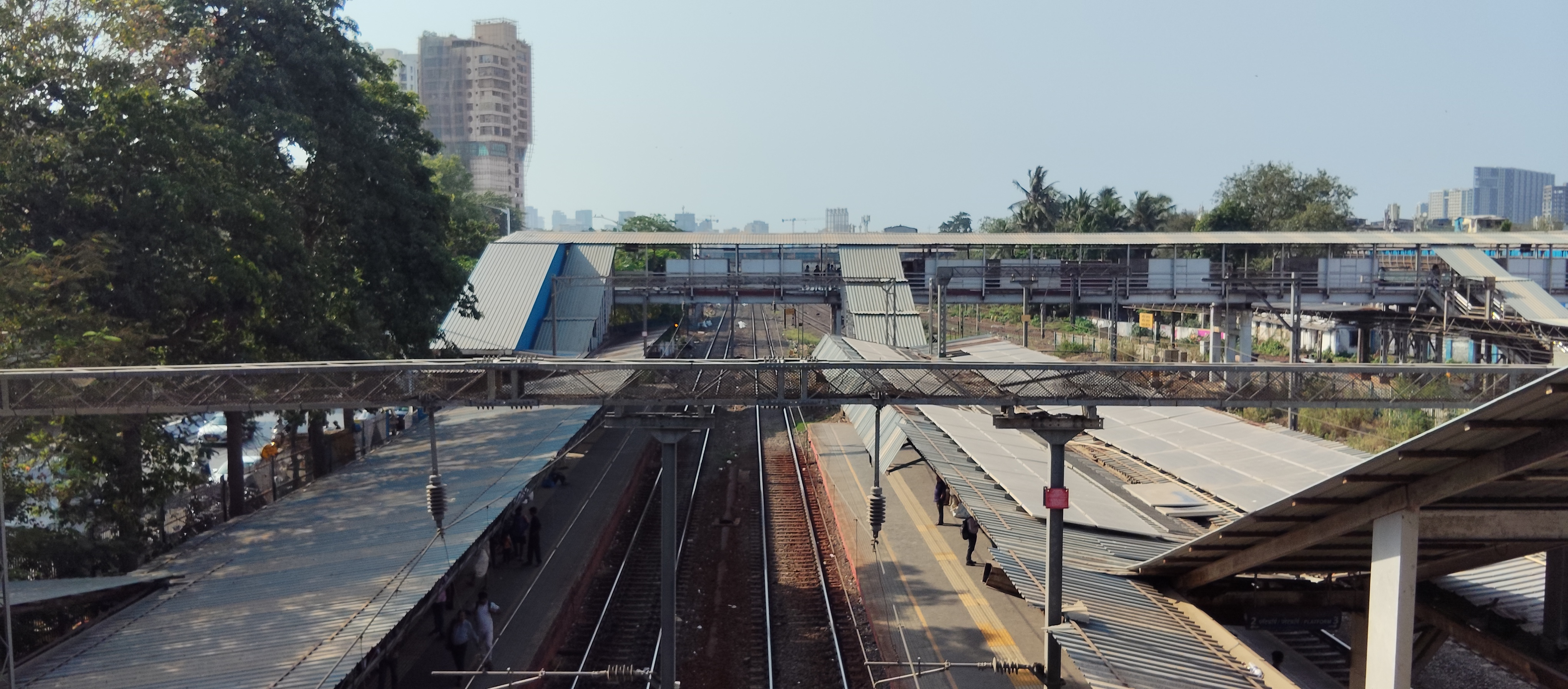
Mahim station- Northward view from FoB

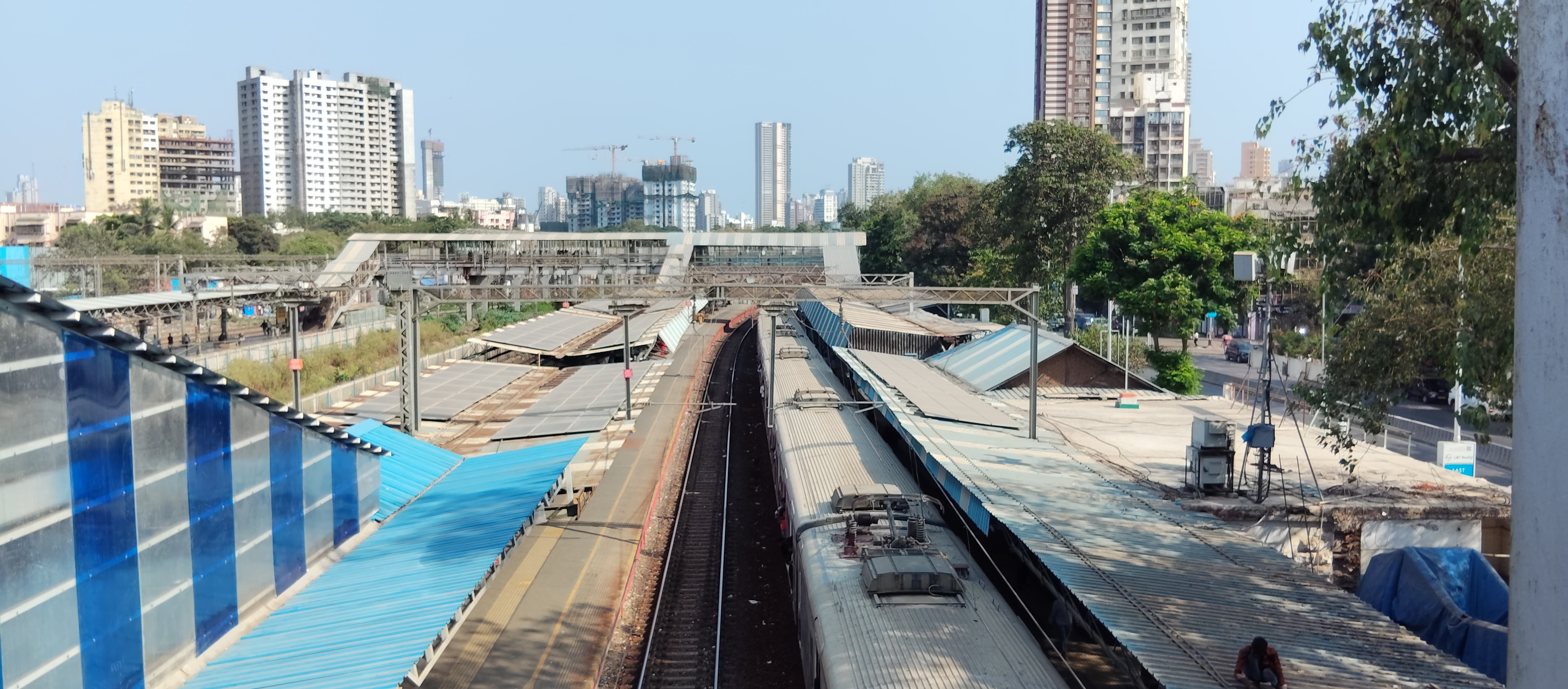
Mahim station- Southward view from FoB

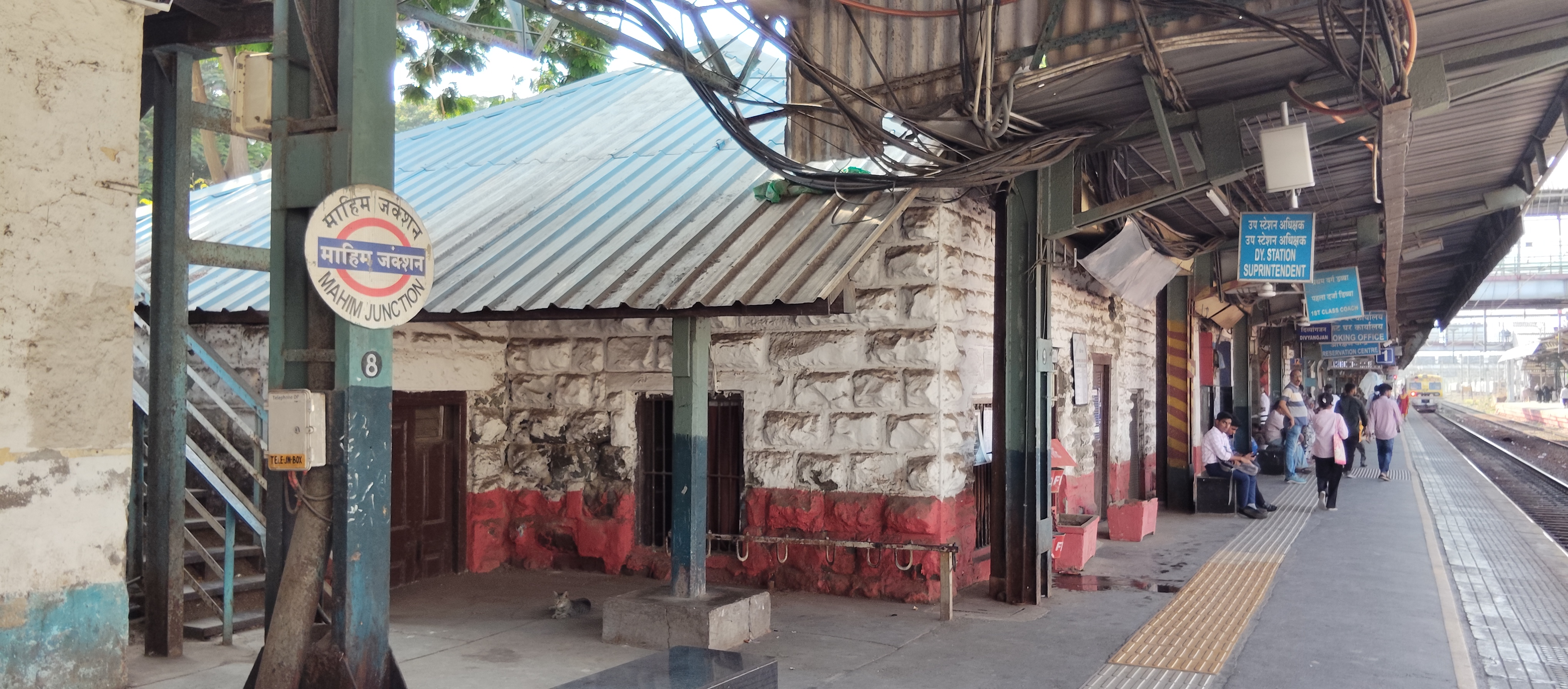
Stone building of the Mahim railway station building

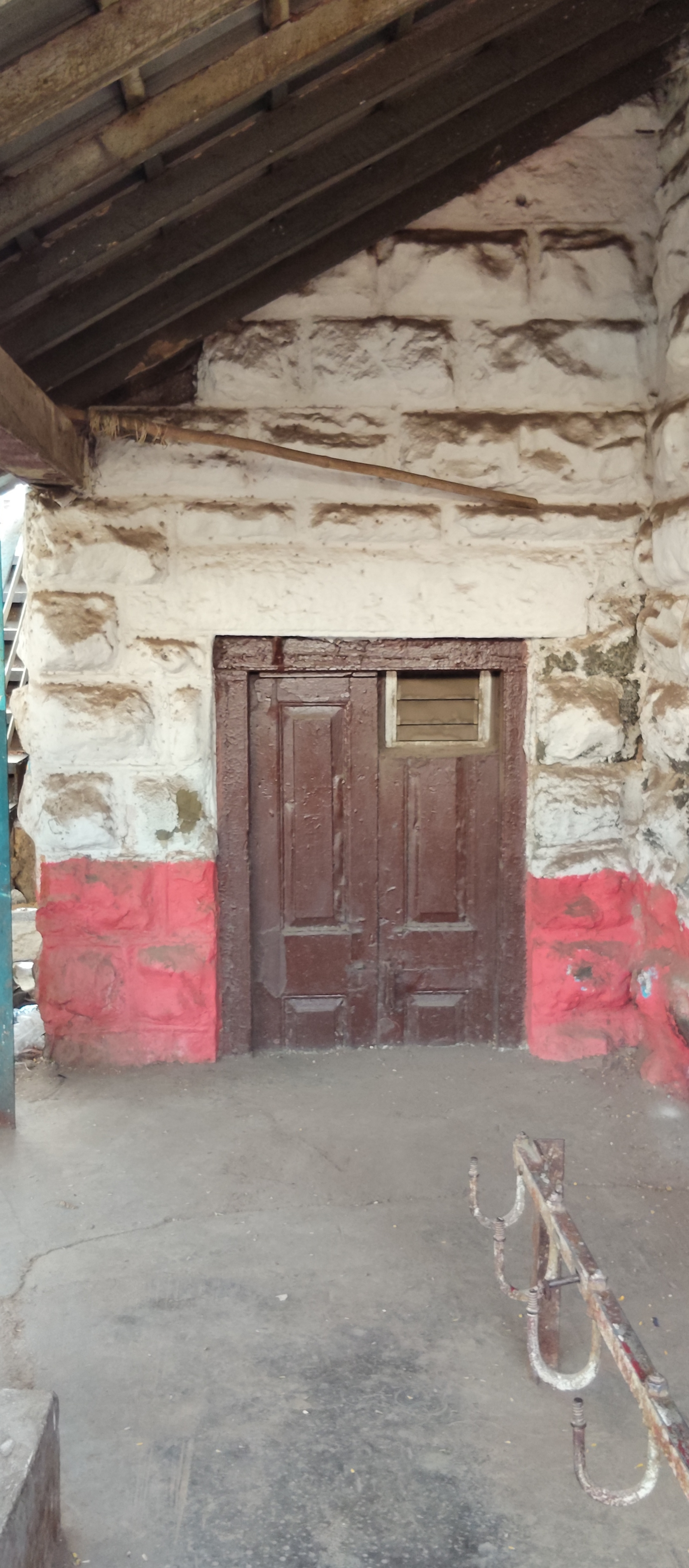
Old "sunken" door of the Mahim station building

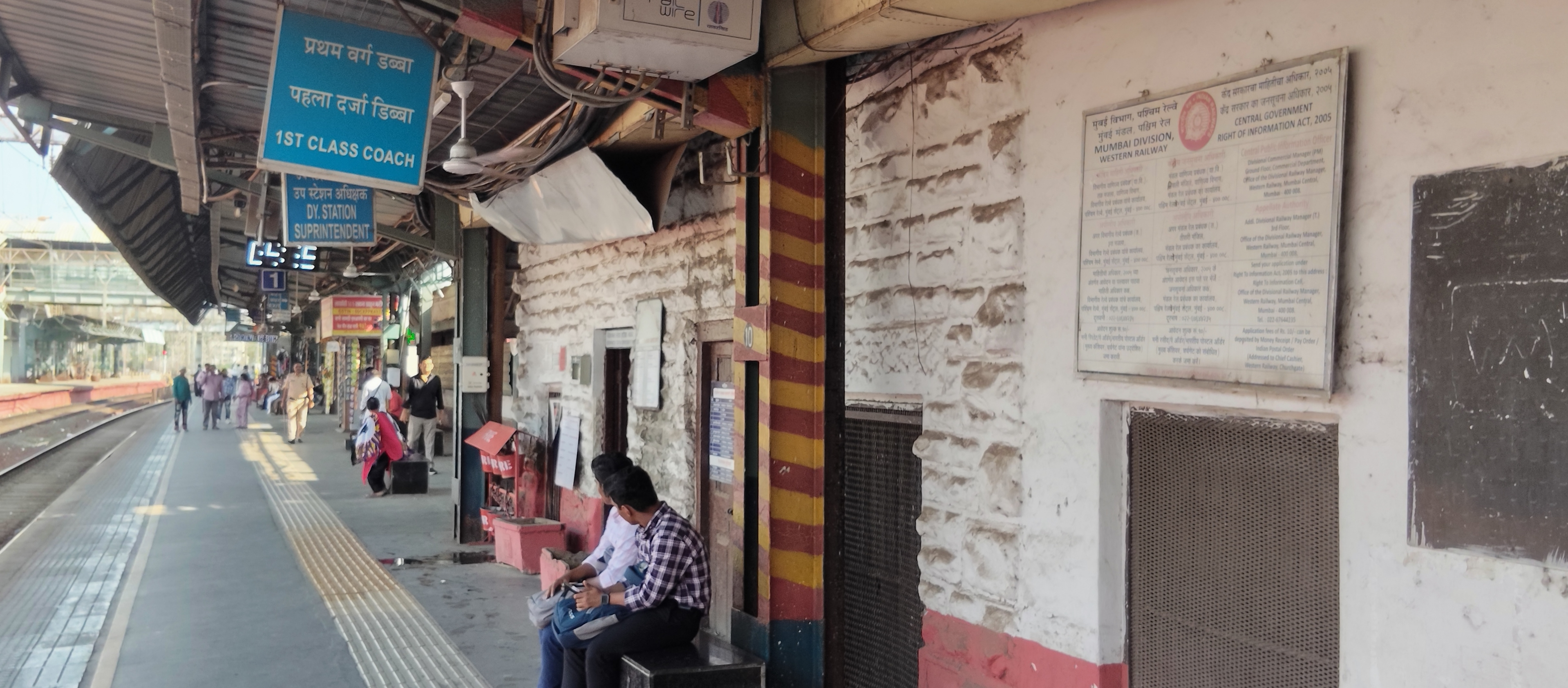
Another view of the Mahim railway station building

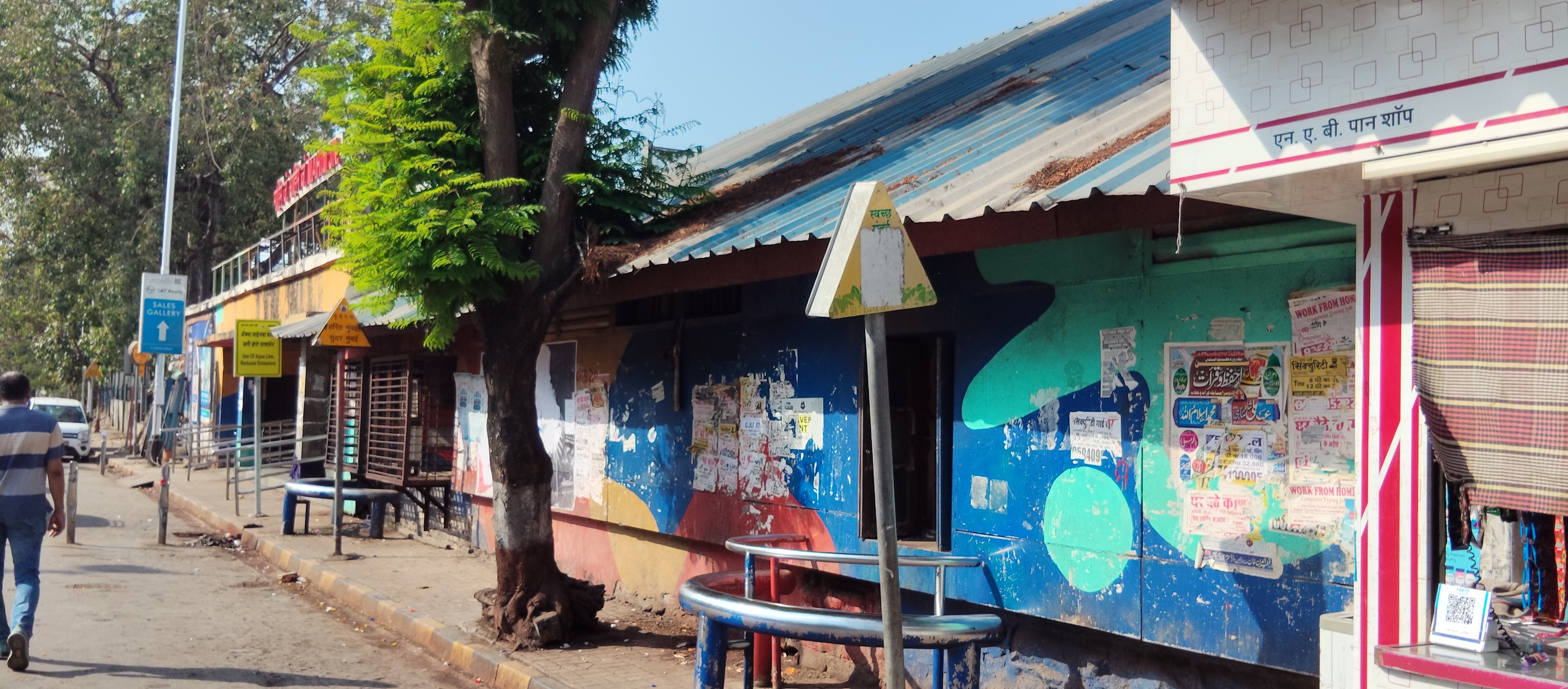
View of the Mahim station building from roadside

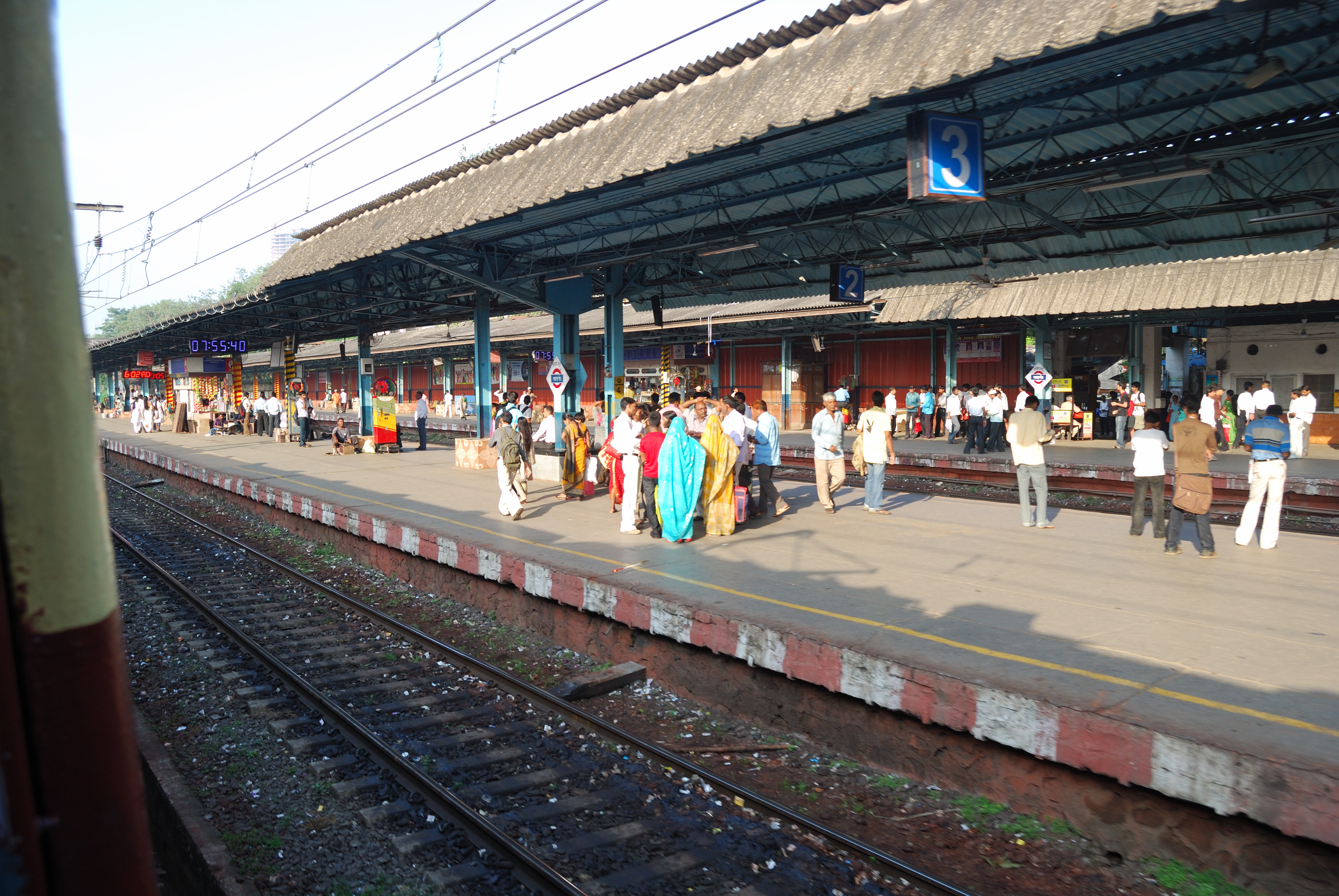
Mahim Junction railway station: View of platform

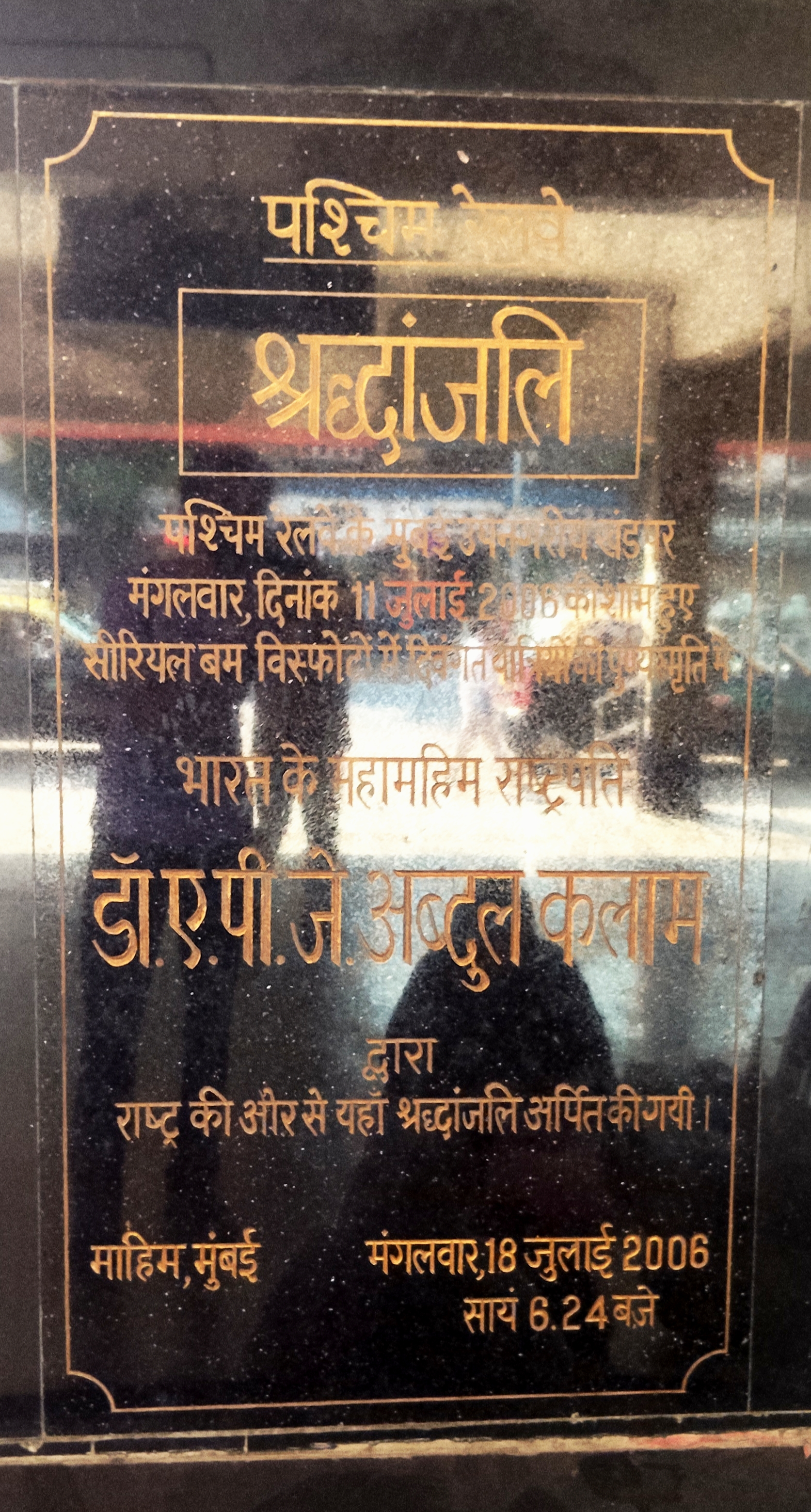
A plaque memorialising the 2006 Mumbai Local train bombings. Mahim was among the affected stations

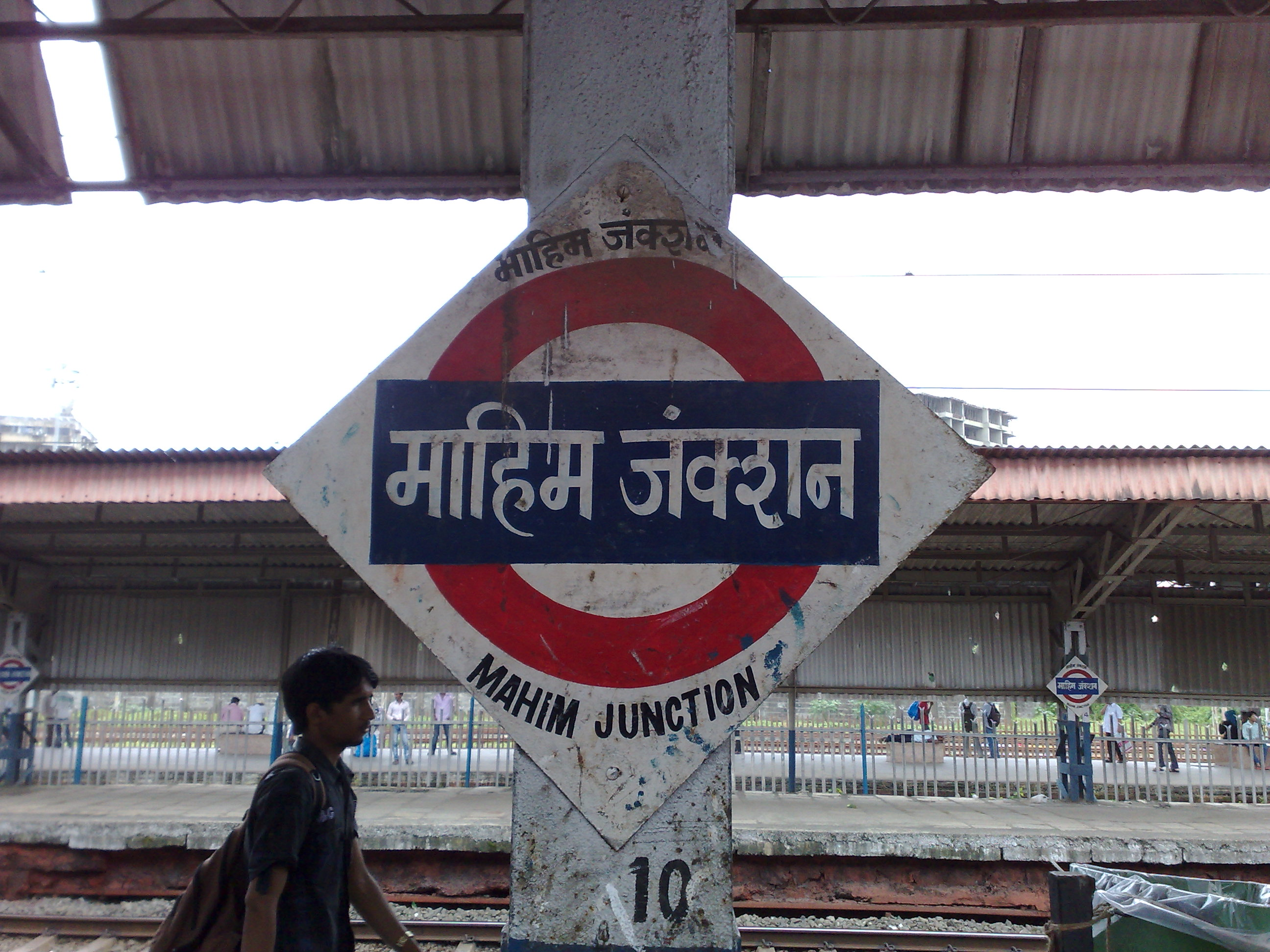
Mahim Junction Platform board
