= Byramjee Jeejeebhoy =

Indian businessman and philanthropist (1822–1890)

Byramjee Jeejeebhoy CSI
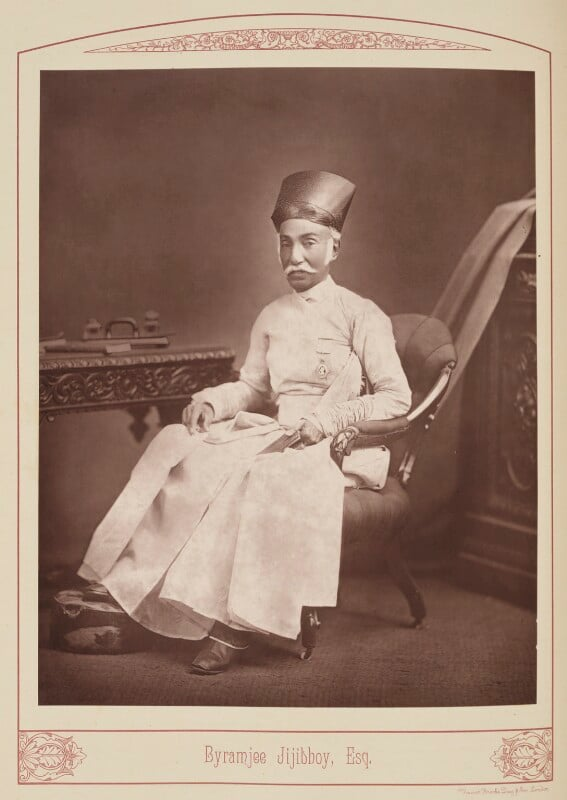
- Jeejeebhoy, c. 1889
- Born: c. 1822
- Died: 1890; Bombay
- Notable work: Founder of Land's End, Bandra
- Children: 2

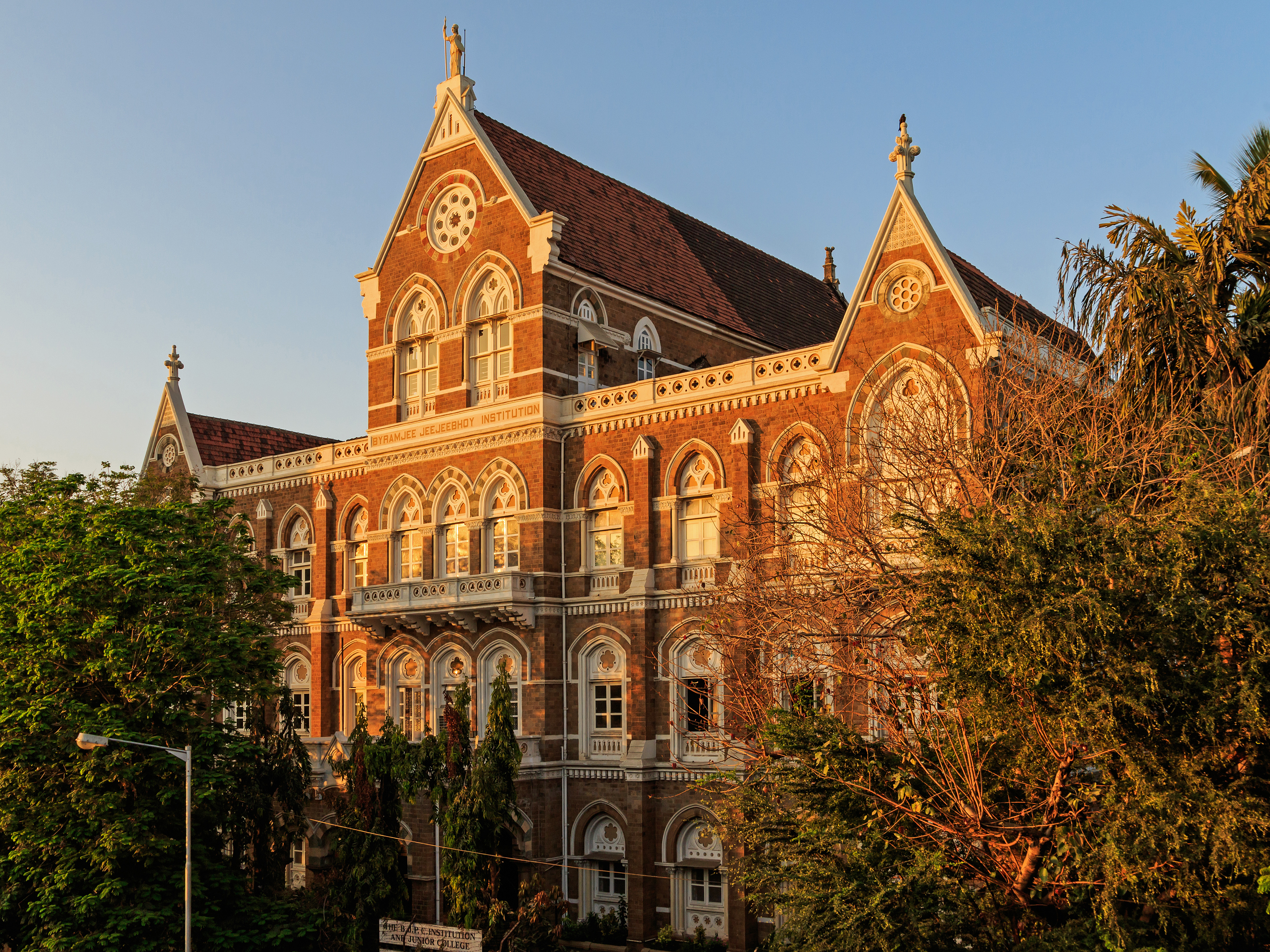
The Byramjee Jeejeebhoy Parsee Charitable Institution in Mumbai

Byramjee Jeejeebhoy CSI (c. 1822–1890) was an Indian businessman and philanthropist who founded several education institutions in Bombay.

1. The Byramjee Jeejeebhoy College and the
2. Byramjee Jeejeebhoy Parsee Charitable Institution in Charni Road, in South Mumbai,
3. B. J. Government Medical College in Pune and the
4. B. J. Medical College in Ahmedabad are four of the notable schools and colleges founded by him.

In October 1830, the British East India Company leased Byramjee seven villages between Jogeshwari and Borivali, which totalled over 12,000 acres (49 km^{2}). Also given to Byramjee was Land's End, Bandra, a cape with the Bandra Fort that became known as the Byramjee Jeejeebhoy Point for an annual rent of Rs. 2800. Byramjee built a beautiful, large mansion as his home on the hill overlooking the fort.

== Bandstand Road ==
Byramjee Jeejeebhoy built a road parallel to the sea in Bandra named Byramjee Jeejeebhoy Road which runs from St. Andrews to Lands End, at his own expense and was opened to the public in 1878. A stone recording this event can still be seen at the junction of Jeejeebhoy Road and Bhaba Road in Bandra.

A horse racing prize, the Byramjee Jeejeebhoy Eclipse Stakes Of India, is named after him.
