= Mahim Causeway =

Road in Mumbai, India

Coordinates: 19.04871°N 72.83816°E

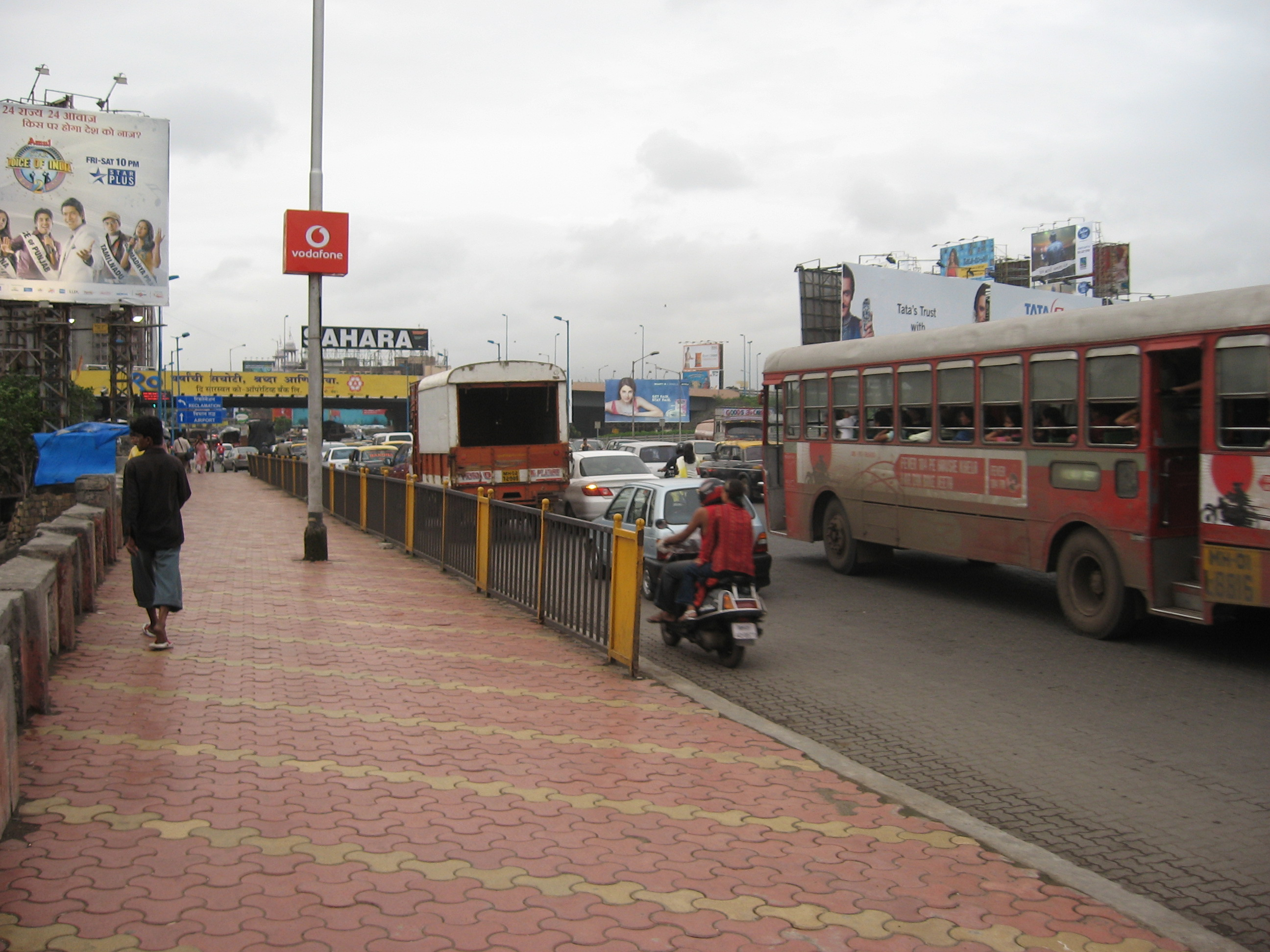
The Mahim Causeway

The Mahim Causeway is a vital link road connecting Mumbai City district/South Mumbai (Churchgate to Mahim) with its northern and western Suburbs (Bandra to Dahisar). The causeway links the neighbourhoods of Mahim to the south with Bandra to the north.

The Mahim Causeway was built between 1841 and 1846 to connect the former islands of Mahim and Salsette, before the land around them was reclaimed. The swampy area between the two islands made travel dangerous and thus a need for a causeway arose. The British East India Company, which governed Bombay at that time, refused to fund the project. After several ferry-related deaths during the monsoon of 1840, Avabai Jeejeebhoy offered to fund the construction of a bridge connecting Salsette and Mahim. After some negotiations between the Jeejeebhoy family and the Government, her husband Jamsetjee Jejeebhoy donated Rs. 155,800 for the causeway, which opened to the public in 1845.

The Mahim causeway forms the link between Swami Vivekanand Road and L.J. Road, being the stretch between Bandra masjid and Mahim church (St. Michael's). It is not to be confused with the Bandra–Worli Sea Link, a major infrastructural project opened on 30 June 2009 which is designed to ease traffic across the causeway by building another bridge across the Mahim Bay.
