= Mahim Fort =

Coastal fort in Mumbai, India

- Mahim, Mumbai, India
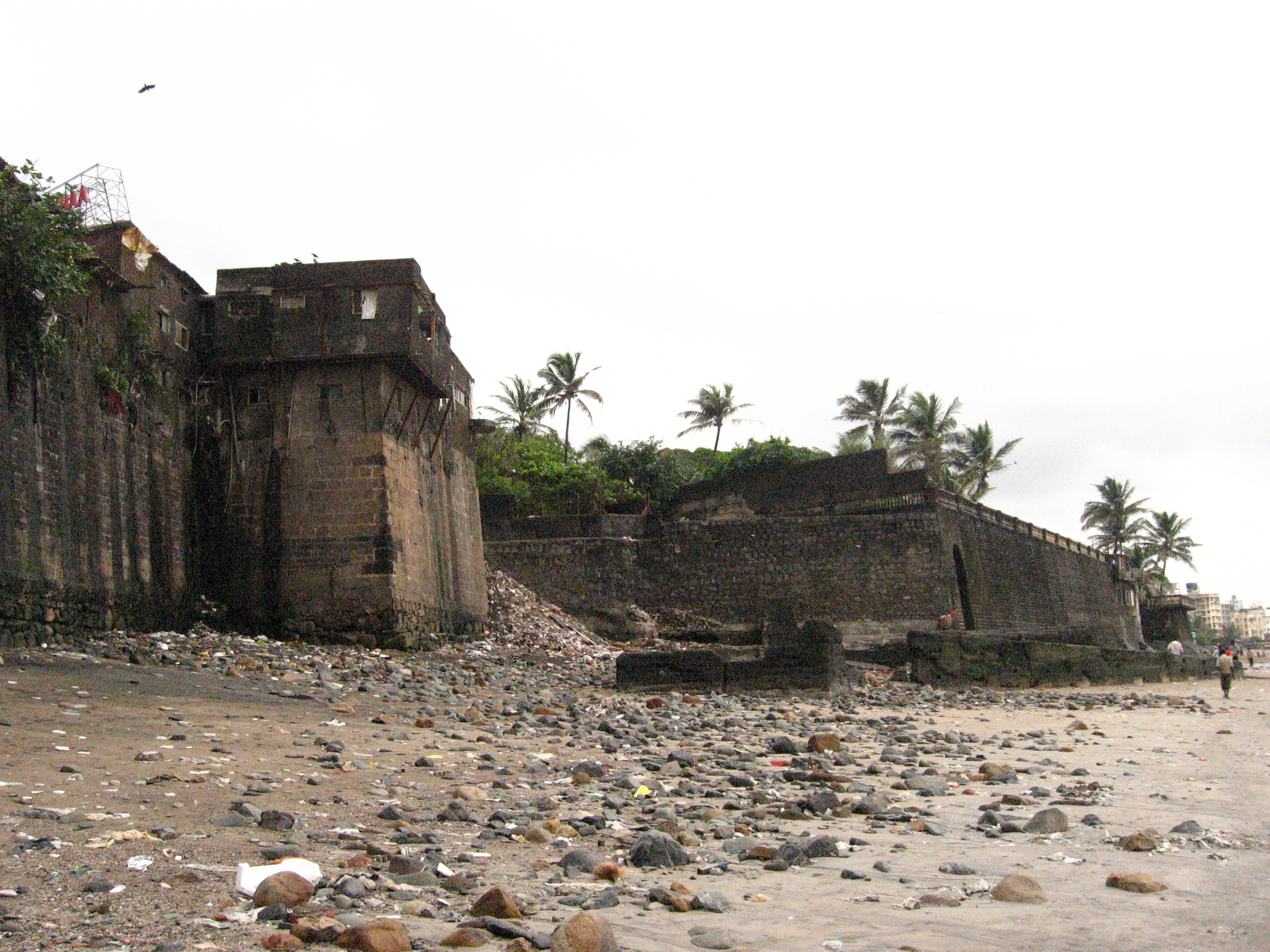
- Mahim Fort as seen from the beach

Site information
- Type: Coastal Fort; Land battery
- Owner: Government of India (1947- Present)
- Open to the public: No
- Condition: Dilapidated

Location
- Coordinates: 19.039848°N 72.837768°E
- Height: 25 metres (82 ft)

Site history
- Built: 13th Century
- Built by: Bhima of Mahikavati
- Materials: Basalt and Lime mortar

The Mahim Fort is a fort in Mahim in Mumbai, Maharashtra state, India. Strategically located on the Mahim Bay, the fort overlooks Worli to the south, Bandra to the north, and Mahim to the east. The origins of the fort are unclear, but it occupies a strategic location that has been frequently contested. The fort is currently in disrepair, suffering from administrative neglect, encroachment of slums, and exposure to tidal erosion.

== History ==
In 1516, Portuguese commander Dom Joao de Monoy entered the Mahim Creek and defeated the commander of Mahim fort. The fort was the site of frequent skirmishes between the Portuguese and a Gujarati ruler before the island of Mahim was appropriated from Bahadur Shah of Gujarat by the Portuguese in 1534. In 1661, the Portuguese ceded the island of Mahim as dowry to Charles II of England. After the English gained control of the fort, it was strengthened by Sir Thomas Grantham in 1684, and became a strategic watchtower against possible Portuguese attacks, and later from the Marathas.

In 1772, the Portuguese attempted to attack this fort, but they were repelled by the British with cannonballs. The Mount Mary's Basilica was damaged during this encounter. According to historical accounts, the fort had 100 soldiers and 30 cannons at that time.

The fort was captured by the British during the First Anglo-Maratha War.

== Encroachments ==
The fort lies off the Mahim Causeway which links the suburbs to the city. The fort is heavily encroached by slums, and parts of the fort have caved in due to tidal erosion and neglect. Though the site is classified as a Grade I heritage structure, nothing much has been done to maintain it. Large boulders are strewn on the sand and crevices as high as three metres (fifteen feet) are visible. Responsibility of the fort is shuffled between the state government and the Brihanmumbai Municipal Corporation, although the fort lies of state government land. In 2004, rupees five lakhs had to be returned as the encroachments were not removed by local authorities. Later, in 2008, Jairaj Phatak, the Municipal Commissioner had proposed a makeover to the fort.

== Gallery ==
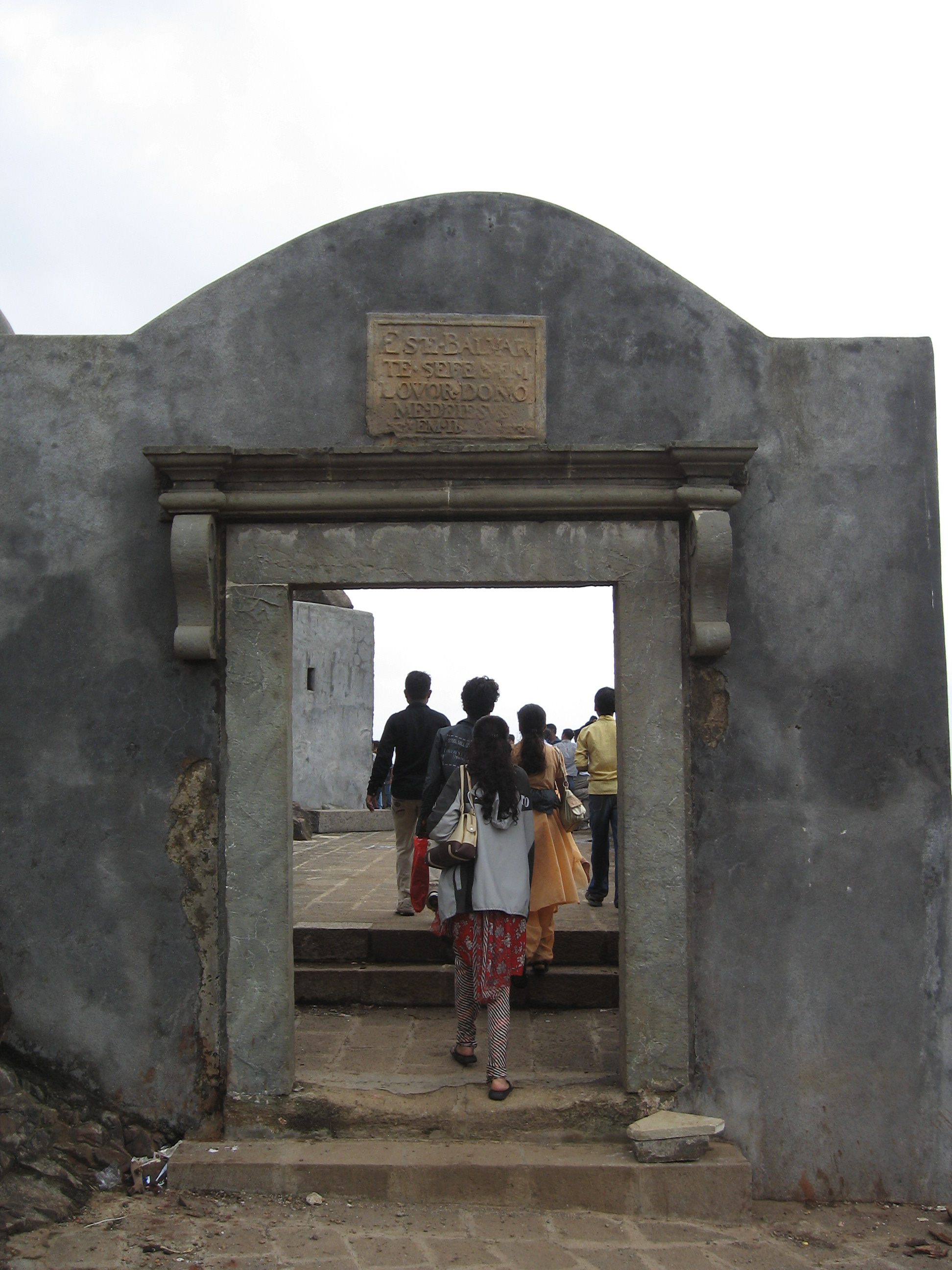

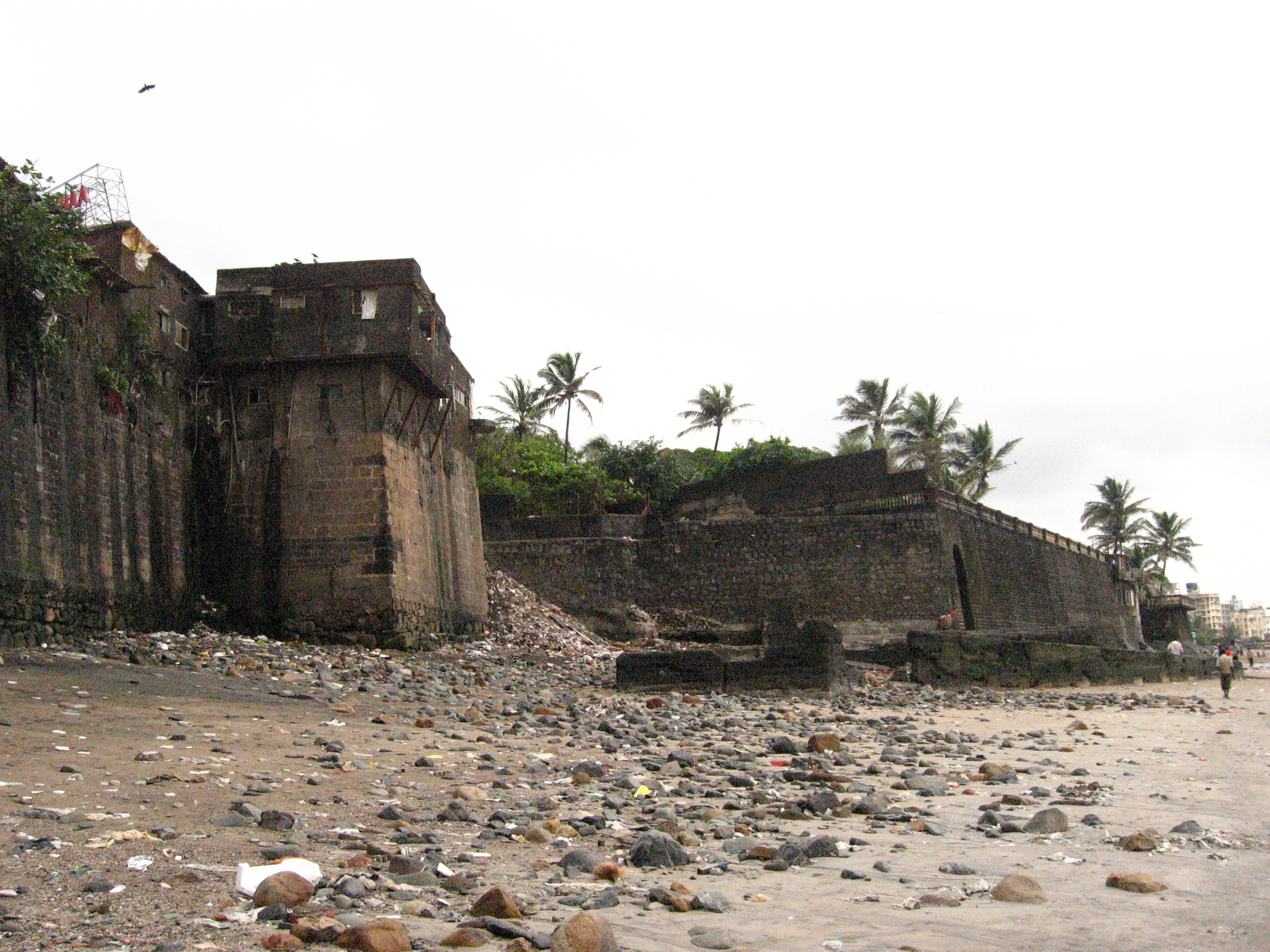

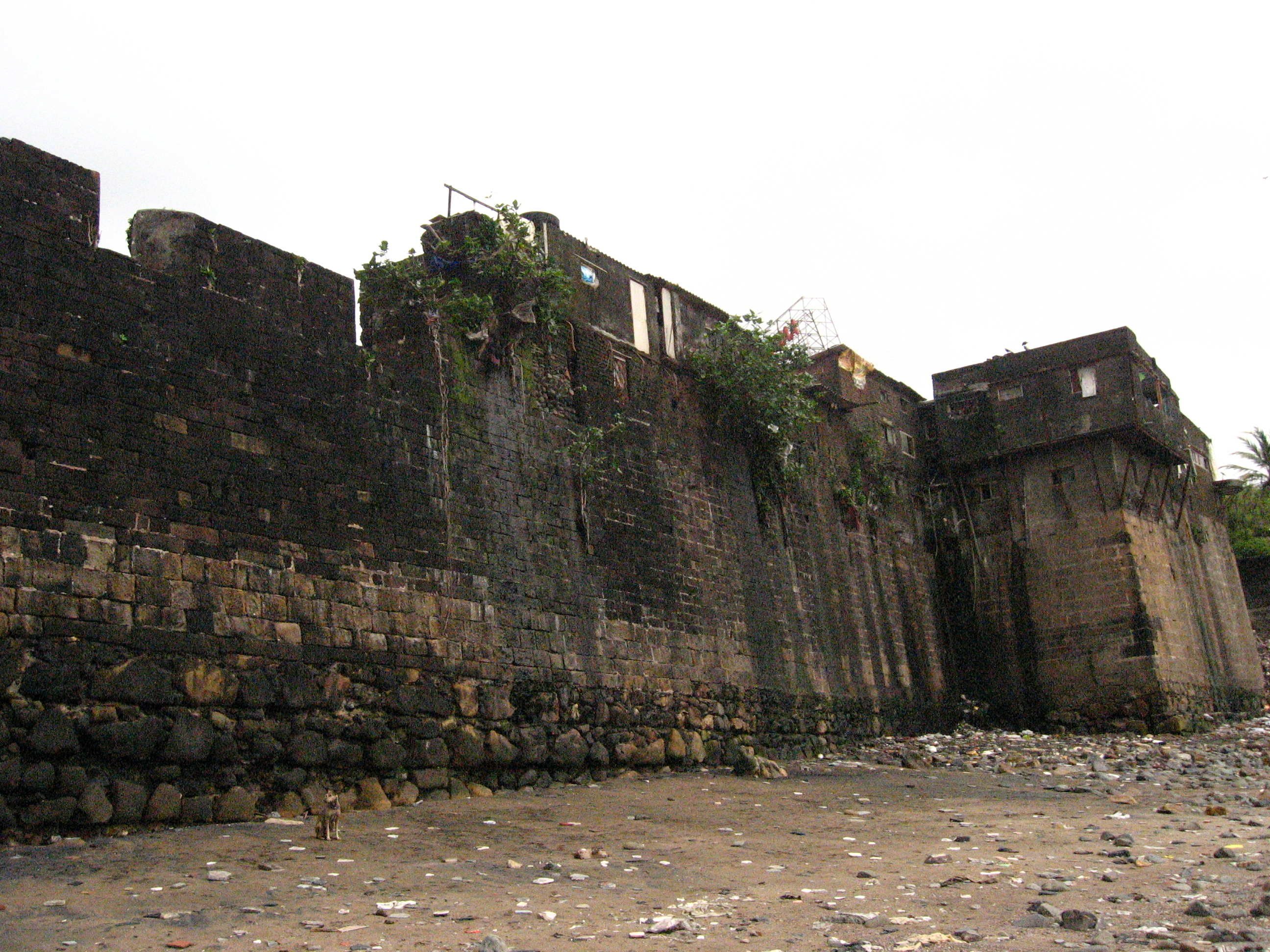

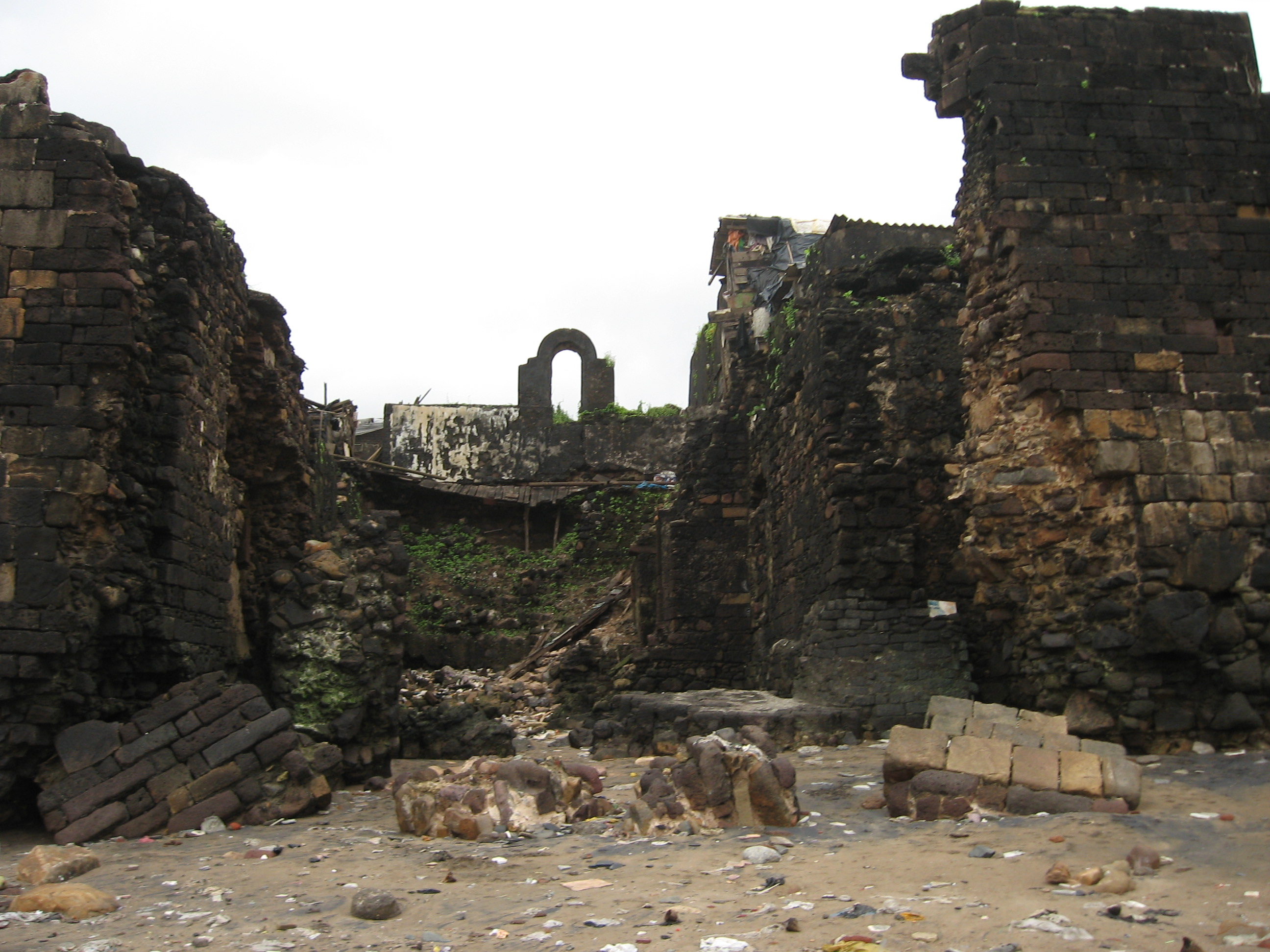

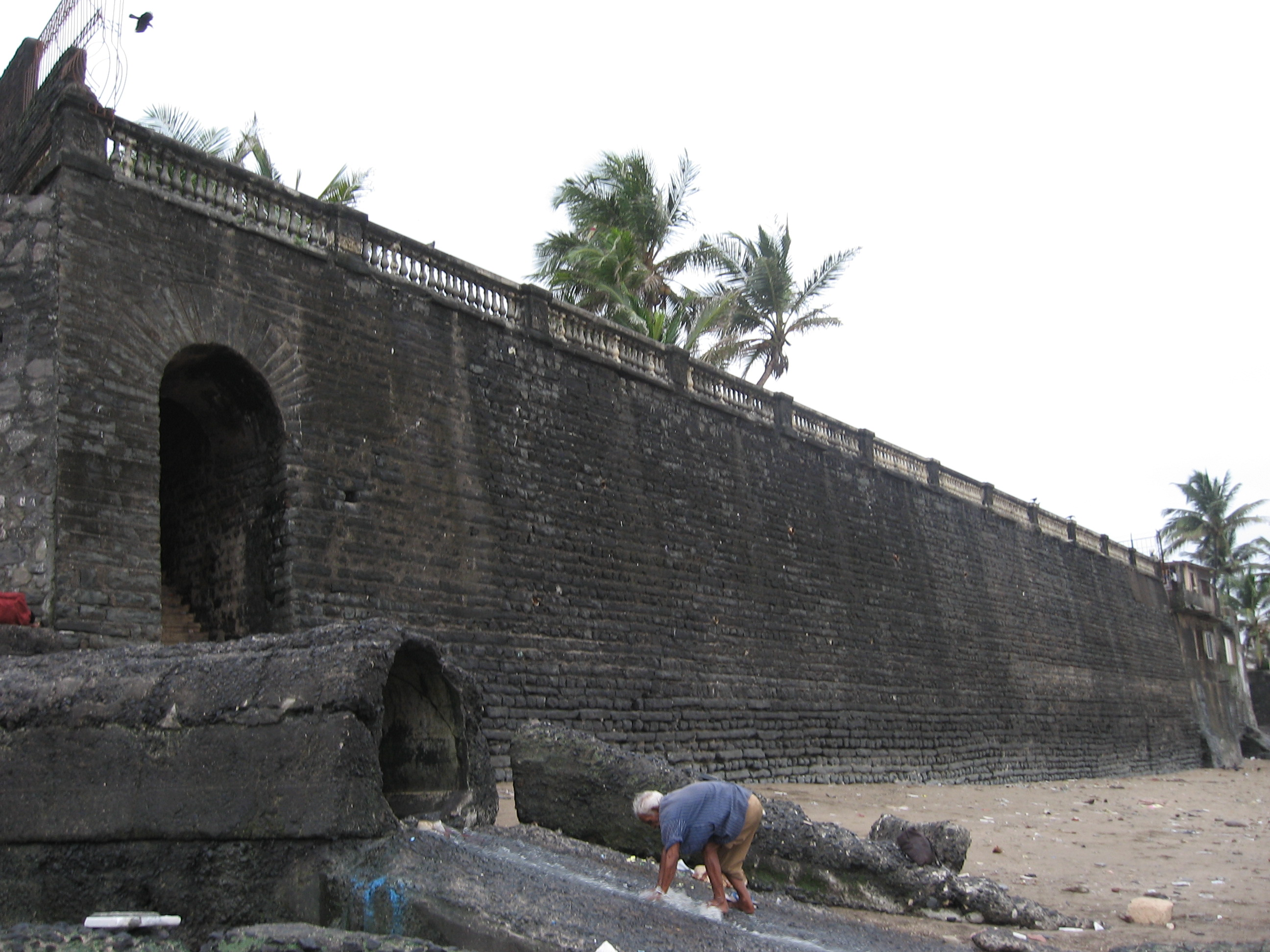

== See also ==
- List of forts in Maharashtra
