= Mahim Creek =

Creek in Mumbai, India

Mahim Creek (locally known as Bandra chi Khadi) is a creek in Bombay (Mumbai), India. The Mithi River drains into the creek which drains into the Mahim Bay. The creek forms the boundary between the Bombay City and suburbs. The creek is swamped by mangroves and has a mini-ecosystem within it.

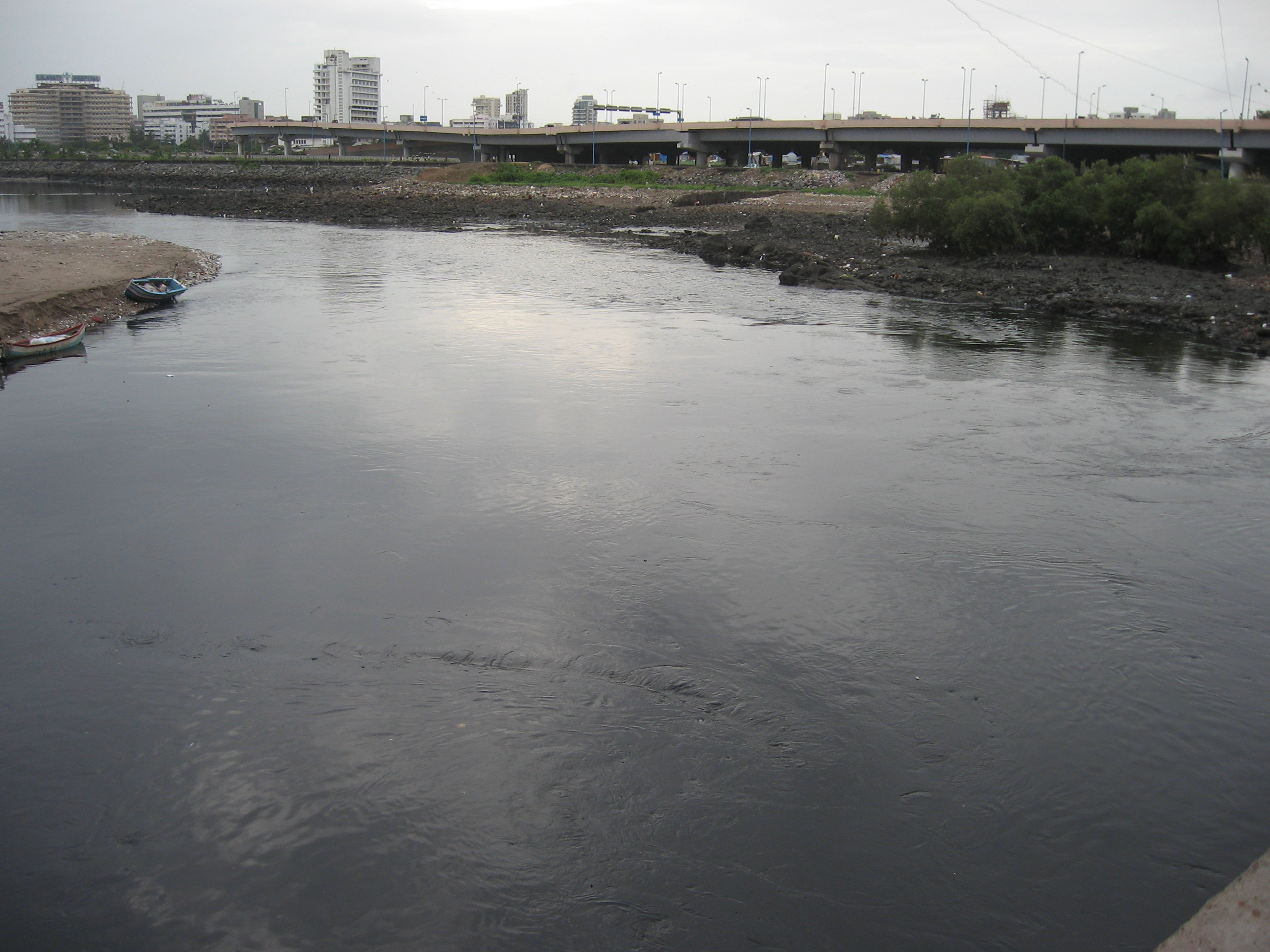
Mahim Creek

It now has the Bandra Kurla Complex with corporate offices on both its sides.

The depth of the creek is 15 feet (4.6 m)

The waters of the creek are foul smelling due to the dumping of untreated industrial effluents further upstream. In recent years, the mushrooming of slums around the waters have caused concern for the mangrove ecosystem, vital to the ecosystem of Mumbai. A lot of encroachments have taken place and the newspaper, The Times of India has exposed them with a series of articles in 2021.

In 2006, it was the site of mass hysteria as thousands claimed its waters had turned "sweet."

== See also ==
- 2006 Mumbai sweet seawater incident
