= Mahim Bay =

Inlet of the Arabian Sea in Mumbai

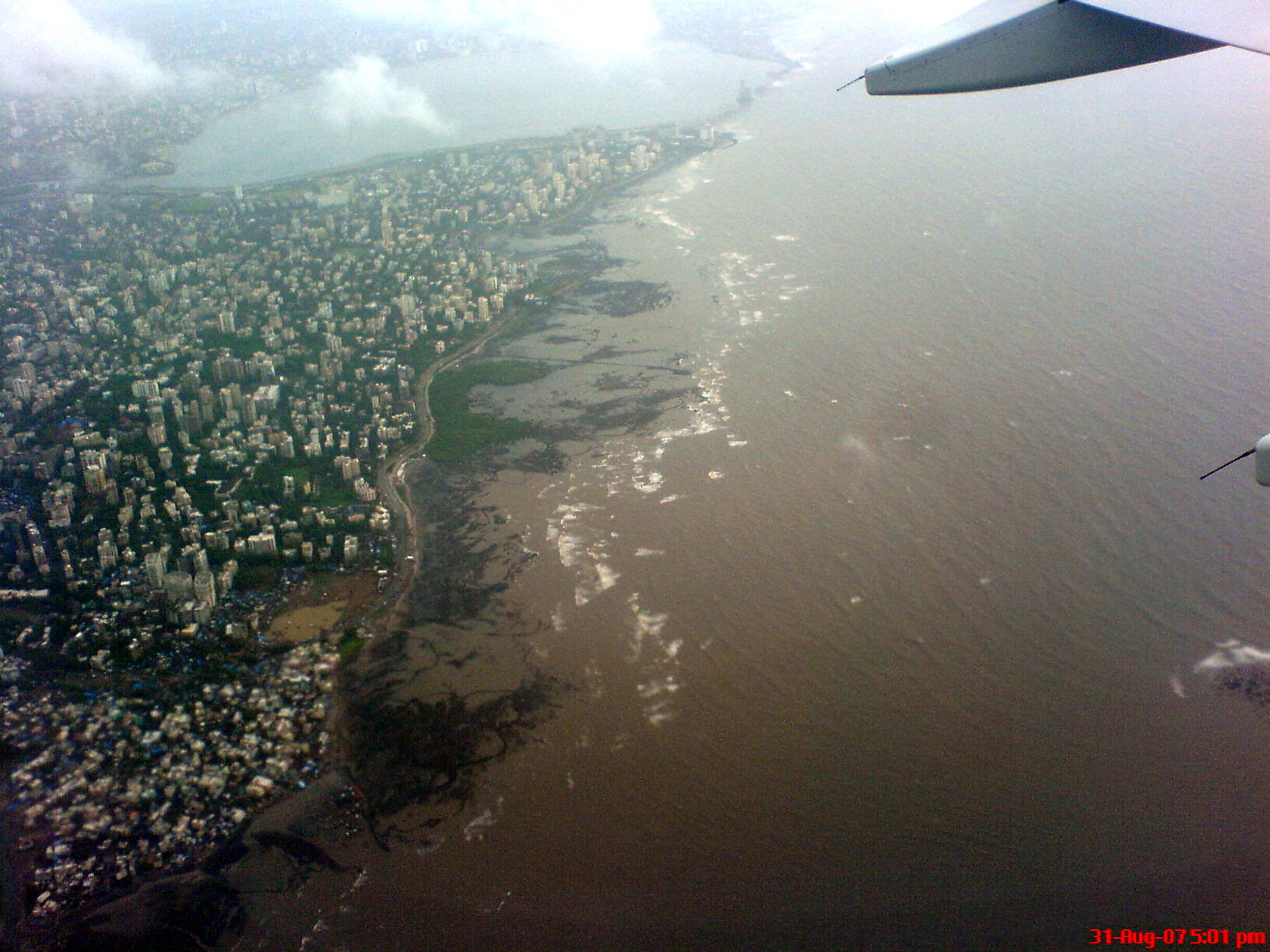
- Mahim bay in the background, Bandra in the foreground

- Location of Mahim Bay in Mumbai, India
- Coordinates: 19.03°N 72.825°E
- Ocean/sea sources: Arabian Sea
- Basin countries: India
- Settlements: Mumbai

Mahim Bay is a bay, part of the Arabian Sea in Mumbai, Maharashtra, India. The southern end is Worli, northern end is Bandra Reclamation and Mahim is in the centre. The bay was named after the islands of Mahim and Salsette were merged in the early 19th century. The Mithi River drains into Mahim Creek which drains into the Bay, and forms the border between the Mumbai city (Churchgate to Mahim) and its Suburbs (Bandra to Dahisar).

During the colonial era, the Portuguese built a watch tower called Castella de Aguada on the northern side. Later, the British built the Worli Fort to the south and Mahim Fort near the creek to defend the Seven Islands of Bombay against attacks by the Portuguese and the Marathas.

The bay holds a small indigenous fishing population known as the Kolis. A large infrastructural project, the Bandra–Worli Sea Link, now links the two ends of the bay by a flyover bridge which reduced the commuting time between the suburbs and the city. During the monsoon season the sea waves hit against the walls and sometimes also enters the small bylanes. The bay is highly polluted due to the drainage of the polluted Mithi river into it. Mahim bay shifts according to the tide; during high tide, water rushes to the Bandra side and during low tide, the Worli side has much water. Recently tar deposits have been found in the bay. The flooding situation is growing worse. It reaches up to the walls of Bombay Scottish School. The citizens living on the sea facing side of the Veer Savarkar Marg have been warned repeatedly of building check walls to prevent loss of lives and destruction of any movable or immovable property. This bay is a cause of concern for the local bodies. It is predicted that the waves will nearly submerge Shivaji Park if their arrival to the shore is so fast. The land at the bay has sunk by 5 mm due to the rampant erosion due to the ferocious sea.

== See also ==
- Back Bay

== Links ==
- Mumbai to get two artificial beaches along Marine Drive and Mahim Bay, costing over Rs.400cr
- Fishermen blockade Mahim bay
- Govindan, K. and Desai, B.N. (1980) Mahim Bay: a polluted environment of Bombay. Journal of the Indian Fisheries Association, 10–11, pp. 5-10.
