= Worli Fort =

Coastal fort in Mumbai, India

- वरळी किल्ला
- Worli koliwada, Mumbai, India
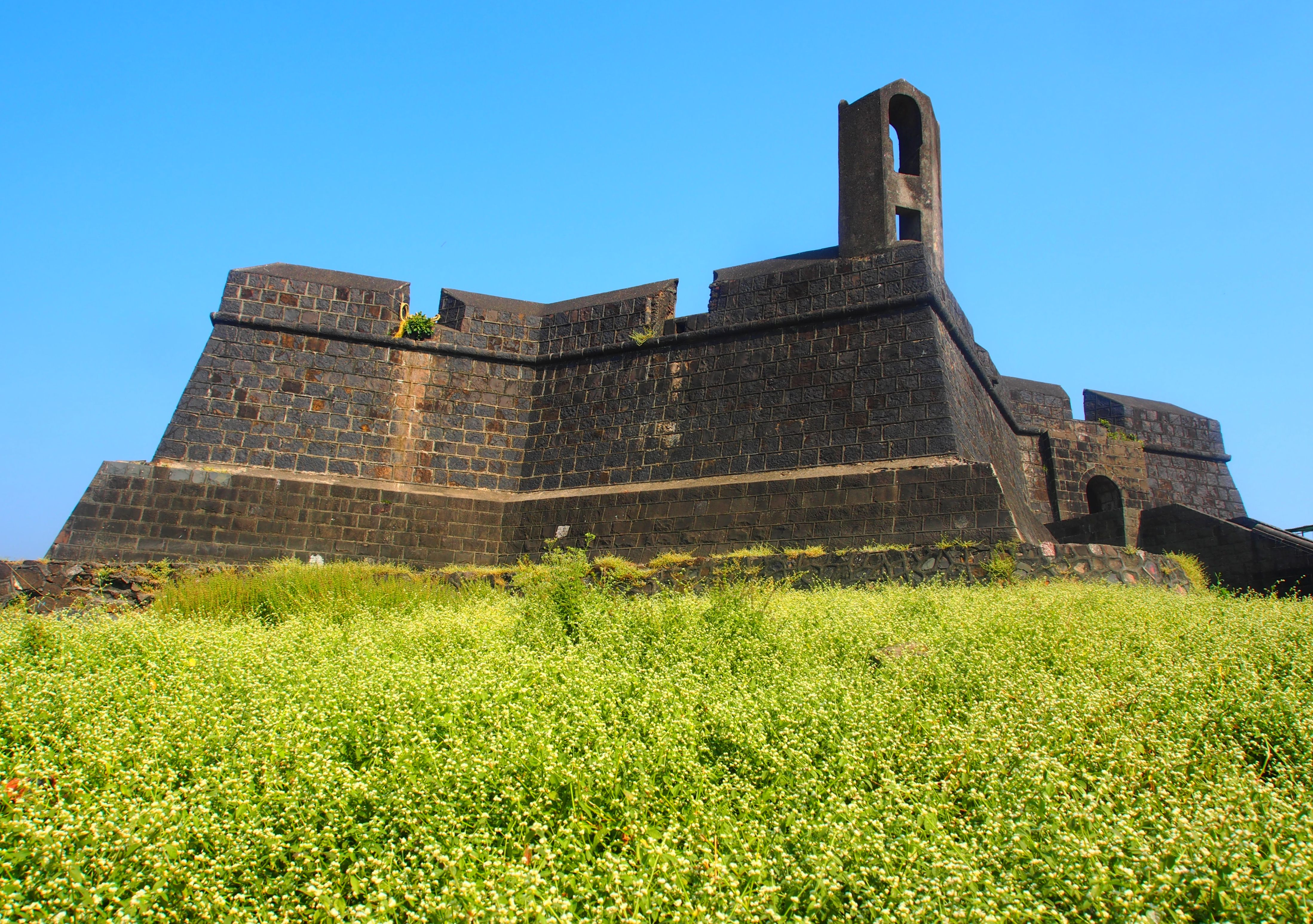
- View of Worli Fort from the base of the hillock

Site information
- Owner: Government of India
- Controlled by: British Raj (1675-1947)
- Open to the public: Yes

Location
- Coordinates: 19.0238°N 72.8166°E

Site history
- Built: 1675; 351 years ago

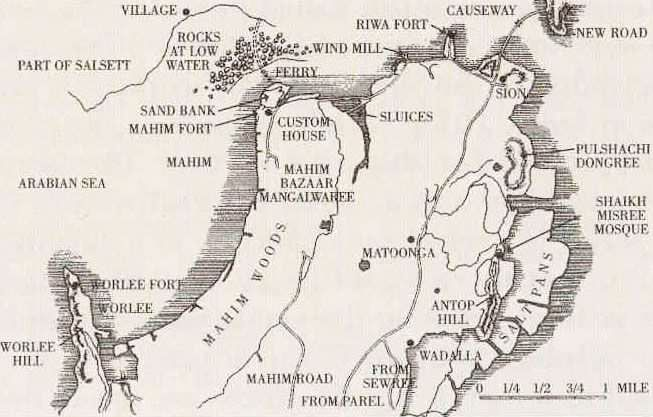
Old map of the region (post 1805).

The Worli Fort is a fort in Worli, Mumbai, India. Though often incorrectly assumed to have been built by the Portuguese, the fort was built by the British around 1675 on Worli Hill. Worli Fort overlooked Mahim Bay at a time when the city comprised just seven islands and was used as a lookout for enemy ships.

The centuries-old village is home to one of the oldest communities of fisherfolk which is still existing in Mumbai.

The area around Worli Hill is also known for its fossils and geology

== See also ==
- List of forts in Maharashtra
