= Mahim =

- Neighbourhood
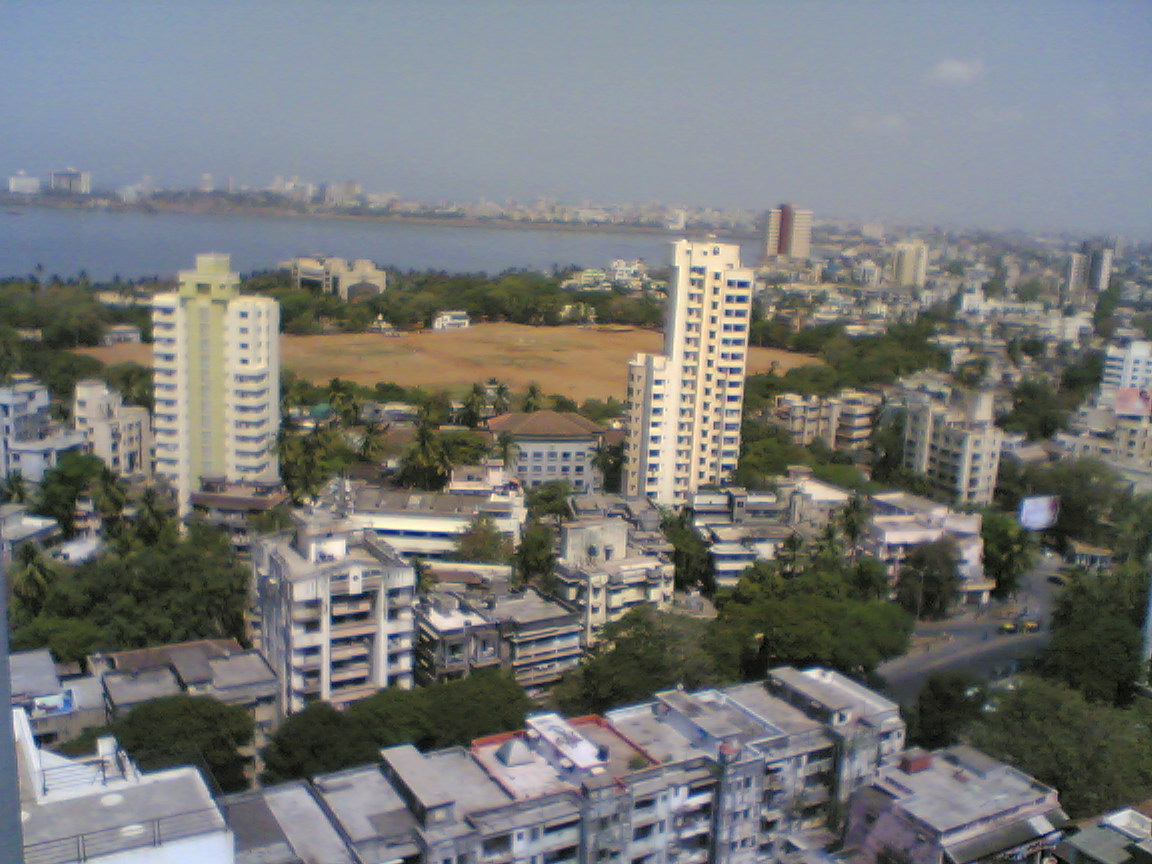
- Mahim and Mahim Bay

- Location within Mumbai Location within Maharashtra Location within India
- Coordinates: 19.035°N 72.84°E
- Country: India
- State: Maharashtra
- District: Mumbai City
- City: Mumbai

Government
  - Type: Municipal corporation
  - Body: Brihanmumbai Municipal Corporation (MCGM)

Population (2020)
  - Total: 83,662
  - Density: 43,983/km^{2} (113,920/sq mi)
- Demonym(s): Mahimkar, Mahimiite

Languages
  - Official Co-official: Marathi English
- Time zone: UTC+5:30 (IST)
- Postal code: West : 400016 East : 400017
- Area code: 022

Mahim, pronounced [maːˈɦiːm]) is a neighborhood in Mumbai, Maharashtra, India. The Mahim Junction railway station on the Western Railway and Harbour Railway of the Mumbai Suburban Railway network is the last station of the city, as neighboring Bandra is part of the Mumbai Suburb. Mahim is an ethnically and religiously diverse town and has a Hindu temple, church, mosque, and Parsi fire-temple, existing within a few meters of each other.

== History ==
Mahim was one of the Seven Islands of Bombay that were later joined through land reclamation projects to form the present-day Mumbai City district.

Mahikavatichi Bakhar, a 15th-17th century Marathi text of doubtful authenticity, describes the history of Mahim as follows: Pratap Bimb, a brother of the king of Champaner, established his capital at a place called Mahikavati, the present-day Mahim village near Kelve (now commonly known as Kelve-Mahim). After losing control of this place, Pratap Bimb established his new capital at present-day Mahim, which he named after his former capital. After one of his successors died heirless, Nagar-shah, the ruler of Ghandivi (Gandevi), conquered the area. In the 14th century, Prince Bimb-dev (Bhima) of Devagiri made Mahim his capital, but Nagar Shah's, family soon regained control of the area as vassals of the Delhi Sultanate. Subsequently, some local families, such as the Nayate and Bhongale ruled over the area for a brief period. The Muzaffarids of Gujarat captured the region in 1429 CE, and ruled it until 1534 CE, when the Portuguese seized it.

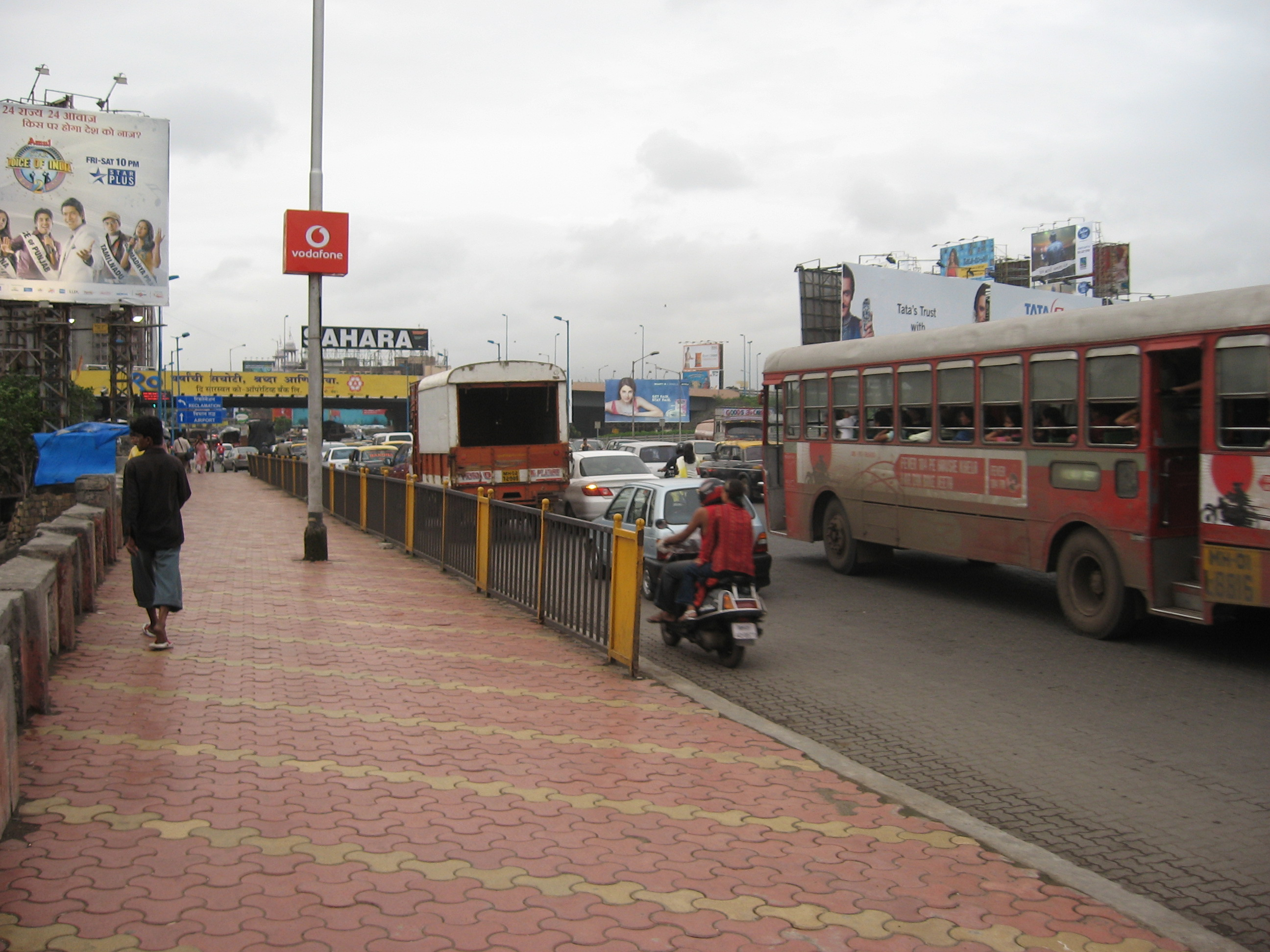
The Mahim Causeway, Koliwada Creek Bridge

Mahim and the surrounding area came under the British control in the 17th century. In the 1840s, when the land around Mahim had still not been reclaimed, the ferry transport to and from the Salsette Island resulted in several accidents and deaths, especially during the monsoon season. To solve this problem, the Mahim Causeway was built with a donation from the Jejeebhoy family, and opened to the public in 1845.

== Mahim Fort ==
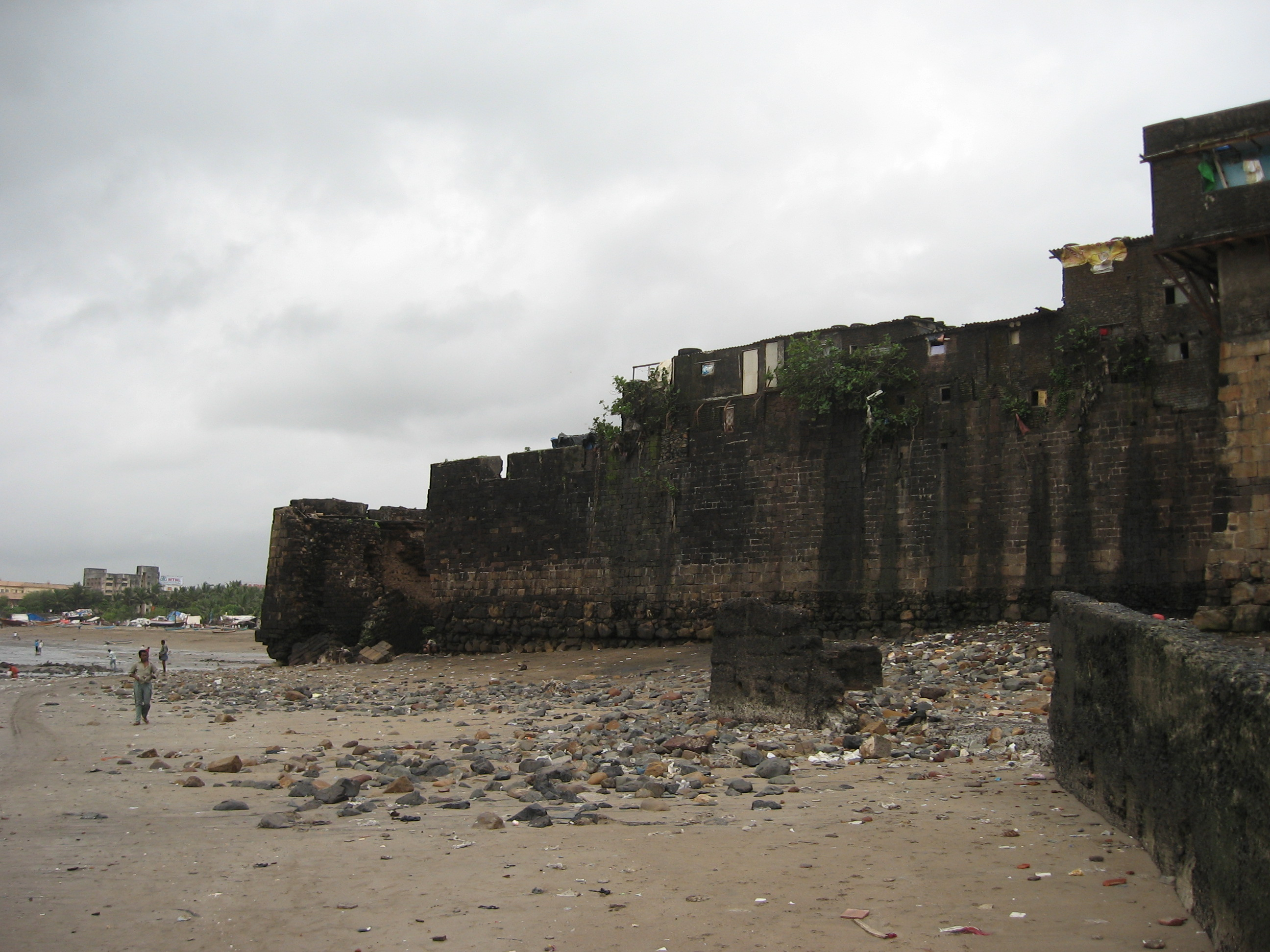
Mahim Fort

The Mahim Fort, which was once visible from the Mahim Causeway and Bandra Reclamation, is barely visible now. The Mahim Fort along with Fort St. George in South Mumbai, was an important base during the time of the British Empire. Other forts in Mumbai and Salsette Island include Sion, Worli, Sewri and Mazagaon.

== Demographics ==
The town has a large and strong base of upper middle class and rich Marathi people

== Geography ==
Bandra–Worli Sea Link across Mahim Bay

Mahim is surrounded by the Arabian Sea to the west, Bandra to the North, Matunga (West) and Dadar to South and by and Sion to the east.

== Transport ==
The nearest railway station is the Mahim junction on the Western Line and Harbour Line of the Mumbai Suburban Railway network. The station is an important Junction, as it connects the Western Suburbs (till Goregaon) with the Harbour line (CSMT to Kings Circle). Taxis and buses are widely used by the locals, and auto rickshaws are not allowed. The Chhatrapati Shivaji Maharaj International Airport is just 4 kilometers away from the town.

The Shitaladevi Mandir metro station, part of the Mumbai Metro network, provides additional rapid transit access in the Mahim area.

== Schools and educational institutions ==
- Canossa Convent High School
- Bombay Scottish School
- St. Michael High School
- P. D. Hinduja National Hospital and Medical Research Centre
- St. Xavier's Technical Institute
- Xavier Institute of Engineering
- K.J. Khilnani High School & Junior College.
- Victoria High School

== See also ==
- Makhdoom Ali Mahimi
- St. Michael's Church, Mumbai
- Mithi River
- Back Bay
- Mahim Causeway
- Mahim halwa
