= List of schools in Maharashtra =

This is a list of notable schools in Maharashtra, a state in India.

== Major cities and towns ==
=== Aurangabad ===
- Nath Valley School
- Services Preparatory Institute

=== Kalyan ===
- NRC School, Mohone

=== Latur ===
- Podar International School, Latur
- Shri Keshavraj Vidyalaya, Latur

=== Mumbai ===
- Adarsha Vidyalaya, Chembur
- Al Barkaat Malik Muhammad Islam English School, Kurla
- Alexandra Girls' English Institution
- American School of Bombay
- Ascend International School, Bandra
- Bombay Scottish School, Mahim
- Bombay Scottish School, Powai
- Campion School, Fort
- Cathedral and John Connon School, Fort
- Children's Academy, Ashok Nagar/Kandivali/Malad
- Christ Church School
- CP Goenka International School
- Dhirubhai Ambani International School, Bandra East
- Don Bosco High School, Matunga
- Dr. Antonio Da Silva High School and Junior College of Commerce, Dadar
- Dr. Pillai Global Academy, New Panvel
- E.E.E. Sassoon High School
- École Mondiale World School, Juhu
- Edubridge International School
- Fort Convent School, Fort
- Girton High School
- Hansraj Morarji Public School
- Holy Cross High School, Kurla
- Holy Family High School, Andheri
- Inodai Waldorf School, Andheri East
- Islamic International School
- Jamnabai Narsee School, Juhu
- Japanese School of Mumbai, Powai
- J.B. Petit High School for Girls, Fort
- JBCN International School, Borivali/Chembur/Mulund/Oshiwara/Parel
- Kendriya Vidyalaya, IIT Powai
- Lilavatibai Podar High School, Khar
- Lycée Français International de Mumbai, Parel
- MKVV International Vidyalaya, Borivali
- Mount Litera School International, Bandra
- Michael High School, Kurla
- NES International School, Mulund
- Oberoi International School, Jogeshwari/Oberoi Garden City
- Our Lady of Perpetual Succour High School, Chembur
- Parle Tilak Vidyalaya Marathi Medium Secondary School, Vile Parle
- Parle Tilak Vidyalaya English Medium School, Vile Parle
- Podar International School
- Queen Mary School
- R. N. Podar School, Santacruz
- Raja Shivaji Vidyalaya, Dadar
- Rajhans Vidyalaya, Anderi
- Sacred Heart Boys High School, Santacruz
- Saint Francis D'Assisi High School, I.C. Colony
- Sheth Gopalji Hemraj High School, Borivali
- Singapore International School, Dahisar
- Sir Elly Kadoorie High School, Mazgaon
- South Indian Education Society High School, Matunga
- St. Agnes High School, Byculla
- St. Andrew's High School, Bandra
- St. Anne's High School, Fort
- St. Gregorios High School, Chembur
- St. Mary's High School SSC, Mazgaon
- St. Mary's School ISC, Mazgaon
- St. Peter's School, Mazgaon
- St. Sebastian Goan High School
- St. Stanislaus High School, Bandra
- St. Teresa's High School, Charni Road
- St. Xavier's Boys' Academy, Marine Lines
- St. Xavier's High School, Fort
- St. Xavier's High School, Vile Parle West
- Udayachal High School, Vikhroli
- The Universal School
- Utpal Shanghvi Global School, Juhu
- Walsingham House School

=== Nagpur ===
- St. Francis De'Sales High School, Nagpur, Maharashtra
- St. John's High School, Nagpur

=== Nashik ===
- Bhonsala Military School
- Central Hindu Military Education Society
- Purushottam English School

=== Navi Mumbai ===
- Greenfingers Global School, Kharghar

==== Nerul ====
- Podar International School

==== Vashi ====
- Avalon Heights International School
- Fr. Agnel Multipurpose School and Junior College

=== Panchgani ===
- Kimmins High School
- New Era High School
- St. Joseph's Convent School
- St. Peter's School

=== Pune ===
- Abhinava Vidyalaya
- Agrasen High School
- Army Public School
- AW Sindhu Vidya Bhavan
- Bhave High School
- The Bishop's Education Society
- B K Birla Centre For Education
- Hindustan Antibiotics School
- Hutchings High School
- Huzurpaga
- Indus International School
- J. N. Petit Technical High School
- Jnana Prabodhini Prashala
- Kendriya Vidyalaya Ganeshkhind
- Mount Carmel Convent School
- Nutan Marathi Vidyalaya
- Panditrao Agashe School
- St. Anne's School
- St. Mary's School
- St. Joseph's Boys' High School, Khadki
- St Jude High School (Pune)
- St. Vincent's High School, Jesuit
- Shri Shivaji Preparatory Military School
- Stella Maris English School
- Victorious Kidss Educares

=== Pimpri Chinchwad, Pune ===
- Global Indian International School, Pune
- Hindustan Antibiotics School
- Jnana Prabodhini

=== Satara ===
- Sainik School

=== Thane ===
- D.A.V. Public School, Thane
- Holy Cross Convent High School
- Euroschool, Thane West
- St. John the Baptist High School, Thane
- Vasant Vihar High School & Jr College

== Others ==
- Barnes School, Deolali, Nashik district
- St. Xavier's School, Kolhapur

=== Ahmednagar district ===
- Dnyanmata Vidyalaya, Sangamner
- St. Mary's School, Sangamner

=== Pune district ===
- Shankarrao Butte Patil Vidyalaya, Junnar
- UWC Mahindra
- Zilla Parishad Primary School, Kardelwadi
