= Chandanwadi =

Chandanwadi may refer to:

- Chandanwadi, Thane, a neighbourhood in Thane city, Maharashtra, India
- Chandanwadi, Mumbai, a neighbourhood in Mumbai, Maharashtra, India
