= Hormuzd Khambata =

Indian choreographer

Hormuzd Khambata is an Indian choreographer, working in the Indian Theatre and Entertainment industry. He has designed and choreographed dance sequences for live events, theatre productions, musicals and award shows.

== Biography ==
Khambata is the eldest son of Parsi parents. After finishing his schooling from J. N. Petit Technical High School in Pune, he enrolled in a hotel administration and food technology course, intent on joining his parents' catering business, but after an article in the Bombay Times mentioned that he was a better dancer than a cook, he became a professional choreographer.

== Career ==
Khambata has been associated with the Filmfare Awards (South), Filmfare Awards (East) and the South Indian International Movie Awards (SIIMA) for many years. He has also choreographed shows like Grasim Mr. India, Femina Miss India (South), Celebrity Cricket League amongst others on an international and national level.

Magazine Hi! BLITZ covered him in their feature "Hi Talent" and newspaper Bombay Times ran a story on him, noting him as a "dynamic dancer Mumbai has to watch out for".

He has a long history with theatre and musicals in the country, having choreographed hits like Broadway and Beyond, Best of Broadway and Razzmatazz. He is currently the dance director of the theatre musical show Blame it on Yashraj.

Khambata runs the Hormuzd Khambata Dance Company and works closely with his 25 dancers. Together, they have performed all over the world, including Germany, Tokyo, Dubai, Sharjah, Thailand, Brazil, Hong Kong and more.
