= NRC School =

NRC School, Mohone, Kalyan
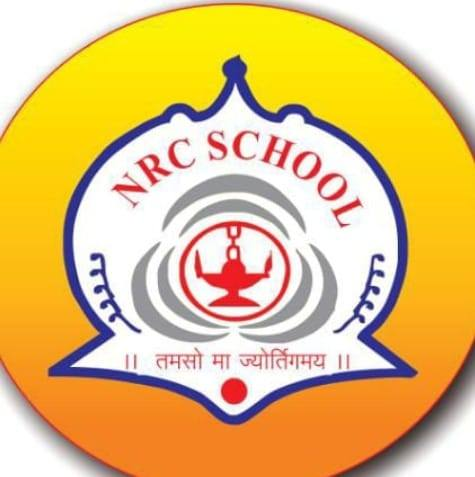
- Maps Kalyan (India) , Maharashtra, 421102; India

Information
- Established: 1950
- School code: 27210600906
- Headmaster: Mr. Suresh Naik
- Campus: NRC Colony, Mohone, Kalyan
- Affiliations: SSC, Maharashtra State Board
- Website: Facebook, JustDial, LinkedIn

NRC School is located in Mohone, Kalyan, Maharashtra. It was established in 1950 and is currently managed by the Adani Group of schools.

== Academic programs ==
The school offers the following academic programs:

- Pre-Primary
- Primary
- Secondary

== Teaching Mediums ==
The teaching mediums used in the school are:

- English
- Marathi

== School Details ==
Below is a table containing details related to NRC School and its sections:

=== English Medium (Private Unaided) (Self Finance) ===
English Medium (Private Unaided) (Self Finance)
School And Section Name	Standards	UDISE No.	School Sections	Principal	Section Details NRC BALMANDIR Jr.KG & Sr.KG Pre-Primary
NRC BALMANDIR	Jr.KG & Sr.KG		Pre-Primary		
NRC ENG PRI SCHOOL	1st To 4th	27210600901	Primary		State Mgmt.: 27-Self Finance School National Mgmt.: 5- Private Unaided (Recognized) School Type: 3-Co-educational
NRC ENG SEC. SCHOOL	5th To 10th	27210600906	Secondary	Mr. Sanjay Mehta	State Mgmt.: 27-Self Finance School National Mgmt.: 5- Private Unaided (Recognized) School Category: 6-Pr. Up Pr. and Secondary Only School Type: 3-Co-educational
NRC MARATHI PRI SCHOOL	1st To 4th	27210601001	Primary		State Mgmt.: 27-Govt. Aided School National Mgmt.: 5- Private Aided (Recognized) School Category: 1-Primary School Type: 3-Co-educational
NRC MARATHI SEC. SCHOOL	5th To 10th	27210601006	Secondary	Mrs. Archana Patil	State Mgmt.: 27-Govt. Aided School National Mgmt.: 5- Private Aided (Recognized) School Category: 6-Pr. Up Pr. and Secondary Only School Type: 3-Co-educational

Kalyan Dombivli Municipal Corporation incumbent Mayor Mrs Harshali Choudhary (since February 3, 2026) is a notable person from NRC School .

== Facilities ==
The NRC School provides various facilities to enhance the learning environment. Some of the facilities available include:

- Library
- Computer Lab
- Science Lab
- Sports Ground
- Playground
- Auditorium

== See also ==
- List of schools in Maharashtra
