= Sudeep Nagarkar =

Indian novelist and writer of fiction (born 1988)

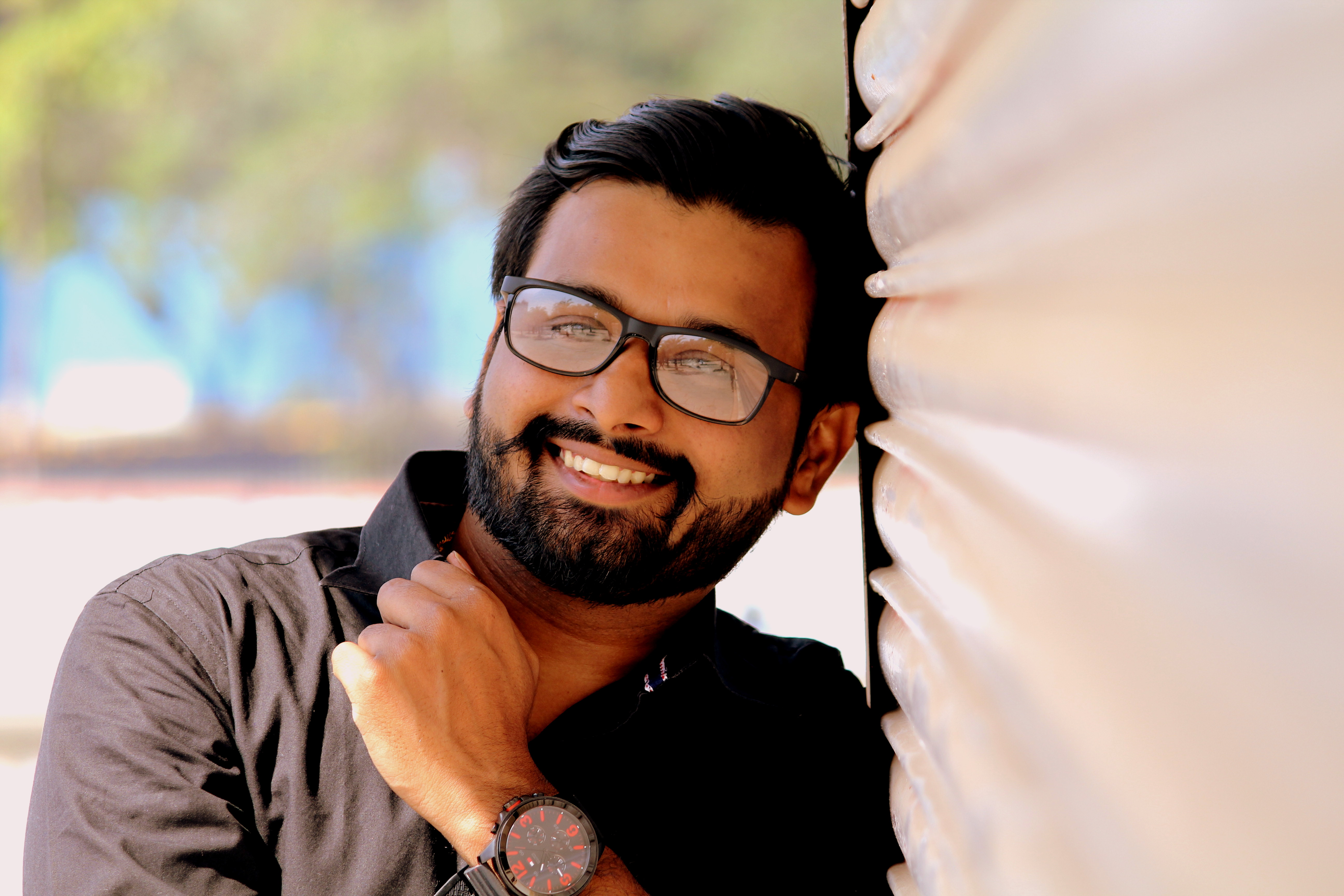
- Sudeep Nagarkar in February 2016
- Born: 26 February 1988 (age 38); Mumbai, India
- Education: BTech-Electronics Engineering
- Alma mater: St. John the Baptist High School, Thane Datta Meghe College of Engineering, Navi Mumbai Welingkar Institute of Management, Mumbai
- Occupation: Writer
- Spouse: Jasmine Sethi
- Writing career
- Years active: 2011 – present
- Genres: Romance, Young-Adult Fiction
- Notable works: Few Things Left Unsaid; That's the way we Met; It started with a friend request; All Right Reserved For You
- Website: sudeepnagarkar.in

Sudeep Nagarakar (born 26 February 1988) is an Indian novelist and writer of fiction. His first novel, Few Things Left Unsaid, was published by Srishti Publishers in 2011. Till 2020, twelve novels authored by him have been published. He is the recipient of the 2013 Youth Achievers' Award for writing for being one of the highest selling writers in India in romance genre. His book It started with a friend request was the most popular fiction book of 2013, according to Amazon India.

== Early life ==
Sudeep Nagarkar was born on 26 February 1988 in Mumbai in an ethnic Marathi Brahmin family to Jayant Nagarkar and Manju Nagarkar.

He completed his schooling from St. John the Baptist High School, Thane. Sudeep pursued B-Tech in Electronics Engineering from Datta Meghe College of Engineering, Navi Mumbai. He completed his MBA in Business Management from Welingkar Institute of Management, Mumbai in 2014. Sudeep recently married his long time girlfriend Jasmine Sethi, an engineer from Delhi. They both had a fairytale lovestory. Wedding rituals were done in both Sikh and Marathi style. The newlywed couple is currently living in Mumbai with his parents.

== Career ==
Sudeep's first book, Few Things Left Unsaid, was published on 10 July 2011. His second book, That's the way we met, was published on 1 July 2012. Soon after the release of his second book, he quit his job at an IT company in 2012 to fully devote his time to writing. He also faced stiff opposition from his family when he decided to turn out into a full-time writer. His first two novels were inspired by his own life. Sudeep was in the habit of penning a diary which consisted of his college experiences and memories. He received "Youth achievers" award in August 2013 for writing three bestselling novels back to back and for being one of the highest selling romance author in India. His debut novel Few Things Left Unsaid is likely going to be adopted for Marathi feature film in 2016.

Apart from writing novels he has been invited for motivational and guest lecture in various institutions and organisations. He has also written scripts for Marathi shows and is developing concepts and stories for Indian television channels Colours and Sony. According to his own conclusion from his own official Facebook page, a large bulk of his readership belongs to the age group 16–26. He was also nominated for the list of "Top 100 influential celebrities of India of 2014" by Forbes India. Besides writing books he is an avid book reader and music enthusiast. His latest and eighth book is going to be launched in the end of 2016 which is based on the long distance relationship with his fiancée Jasmine.

== Works ==
Sudeep's literary works produced so far have been of the romance genre. His writings have the theme of friendship, true love and trust in a relationship. All his books are based on real life and true stories.

1. Few Things Left Unsaid – Sudeep Nagarkar's first novel, It was published on 10 July 2011 and is a story of engineering college mates Aditya and Riya who fall in love with each other. A break-up takes place between them, but they get back together again. But something happens once again which changes lives of both the lovers. This unpredictable story with many twists and turns is completed in the sequell That's the way we met.
2. That's the way we met – The book is the sequel of his earlier book Few Thing Left Unsaid. It was published just a year later on 1 June 2012 by Random House Publishers.
3. It Started With a Friend Request – The main characters of this book are Akash, a young single and conservative boy and the other being Aleesha, a mass media student and the single child of her parents. They met at a local discothèque and exchanged their BlackBerry pins. With regular chatting, both fell in love with each other. As they start taking their relation seriously and plan to take it to next level, a sudden misfortune strikes in their lives. An accident which shakes the world of Aleesha and Akash.
4. Sorry You're Not My Type – The story revolves around the Delhi-based college music band VAYU comprising three contrasting personalities Vikrant, Anamika and Yuvi. Then, Aditya, a stranger comes into their lives which changes the course of their lives in ways they could have never imagined. This novel is portrayed as a sweet story of love, romance, drama, betrayal, hatred and friendship.
5. You're The Password to my Life – The protagonists of this book are Virat and Kavya. Although they have totally different personalities and interests, they are best friends. Aditya is the narrator of the story. The story is all about how friendship is put to test when an unforeseen incident comes in their life and how they overcome it. The book was published in December 2014. The novel is based on Sudeep's cousin's life.
6. You're trending in my dreams – Four college students, Varun, Ahana, Malvika and Garima, with different backgrounds and stark personalities move together into a flat in Mumbai. Despite their differences, their commitment to the bond of friendship they have built over time ties them together. The story is how things get turbulent in life when one of their friends finds herself caught in a mess and in the end will they be able to recover or fall apart.
7. She swiped right into my heart – Geet, one of the most unpopular girls in college, is best friends with the beautiful and sought after Shibani. To win the popularity vote, Geet takes the help of college hottie Rudra, who agrees to act as her ‘boyfriend' as he sees this as an opportunity to get closer to Shibani. Little does he know that Shibani has been harbouring feelings for someone else all along. As misunderstandings and jealousies take centre stage, Geet must make a decision that will affect not just her own life, but also those of her loved ones. She Swiped Right into My Heart is a story about love gained and lost, and the healing power of friendship. .
8. All Rights Reserved For You – All Rights Reserved for You is Sudeep Nagarkar’s 8th novel and this time, he is enchanting his own love story with his to-be wife, Jasmine. Although everything is cloaked under the layers of romantic fiction, one that Sudeep is known for. The story of All Rights Reserved for You is about Aditya and Jasmine – a couple who are poles apart mentally as well as physically but still fall for each other head over heels. Aditya, the ‘hero’ of the novel, is a passionate writer while Jasmine cannot even imagine herself reading. Both live miles away in different cities. With almost nothing in common, love sneaks in and changes their lives. This novel is all about how love can make things possible. Long-distance being the villain of the story, Aditya and Jasmine resort to bridge their relationship with Skype, Facebook and WhatsApp. It is a soothing, real-life story of two lovebirds separated by distance but are never really far apart. Trust builds relations but most long-distance relations are destroyed because of it. But this novel proves all conventions wrong to prove long distance relationships do work ‘very well’.
9. Our Story Needs No Filter – Sudeep Nagarkar announced his new book 'Our Story Needs No Filter' on 12 June. The book is published by Penguin Random House. Sudeep announced the book, telling his readers 'There will be no filter over the pseudo happenings around us'. Five friends Jai, Raghav, Chris, Megha and Ruhi, belonging to different castes and religions, stays in MG University hostel. While Ruhi is an upper caste Brahmin, a lovely girl who cares for animals, Raghav is a friendly guy, who is always agitated when it comes to his caste. Megha is an intelligent, reliable girl who loves to speak up her mind and believes in love and relationships while Jai is a strong, decent guy who cares for his friends, but doesn't really believe in relationships much. Love and Time binds Raghav and Ruhi together. Everything seemed perfect, when entered Krishna, along with his student party and the movement 'Kraanti', which changed every equations of their lives. Will they ever be the same friends again with their massacred trusts? A powerful story of love, religion, politics and friendship which will fill your heart with varied emotions.
10. She Friend-Zoned My Love - Sudeep Nagarkar announced his latest book on 13 March 2018. The book is a tale of a man longing for a romantic relationship but ending up in a complicated scenario.
11. The Secrets We Keep
12. Stand by Me
13. A Second Chance
14. Can't Quarantine Our Love

== See also ==
- Chetan Bhagat
