= Shankarrao =

Shankarrao may refer to

- Shankarrao Bajirao Patil, Indian politician.
- Shankarrao Chavan, Indian politician.
- Shankarrao Deo, Indian politician.
- Shankarrao Gadakh, Indian politician.
- Shankarrao Godambe, Indian cricketer.
- Shankarrao Mohite-Patil, Indian politician.
- Shankarrao Salvi, Indian kabaddi player
- Shivajirao Shankarrao Deshmukh, Indian politician.
- Shankarrao Butte Patil Vidyalaya, Junnar, school in Maharasthra
- Dr. Shankarrao Chavan Government Medical College, in Nanded.
