= Greenfingers (disambiguation) =

Greenfingers or Green Fingers may refer to:

- Greenfingers, 2000 British comedy film
- Greenfingers (TV programme), 1990s Irish programme
- Green Fingers (1947 film), British drama
- Green Fingers (TV series), 1950s Australian series

== See also ==
- Greenfingers Global School
- Green finger sponge
- Green Thumb (disambiguation)
- "Green Fingers and Thumbs" (The Worst Witch), 2000 TV episode
