= Kopineshwar Mandir, Thane =

Ancient Hindu temple in Thane (India)

Shri Kopineshwar Temple (Thane)
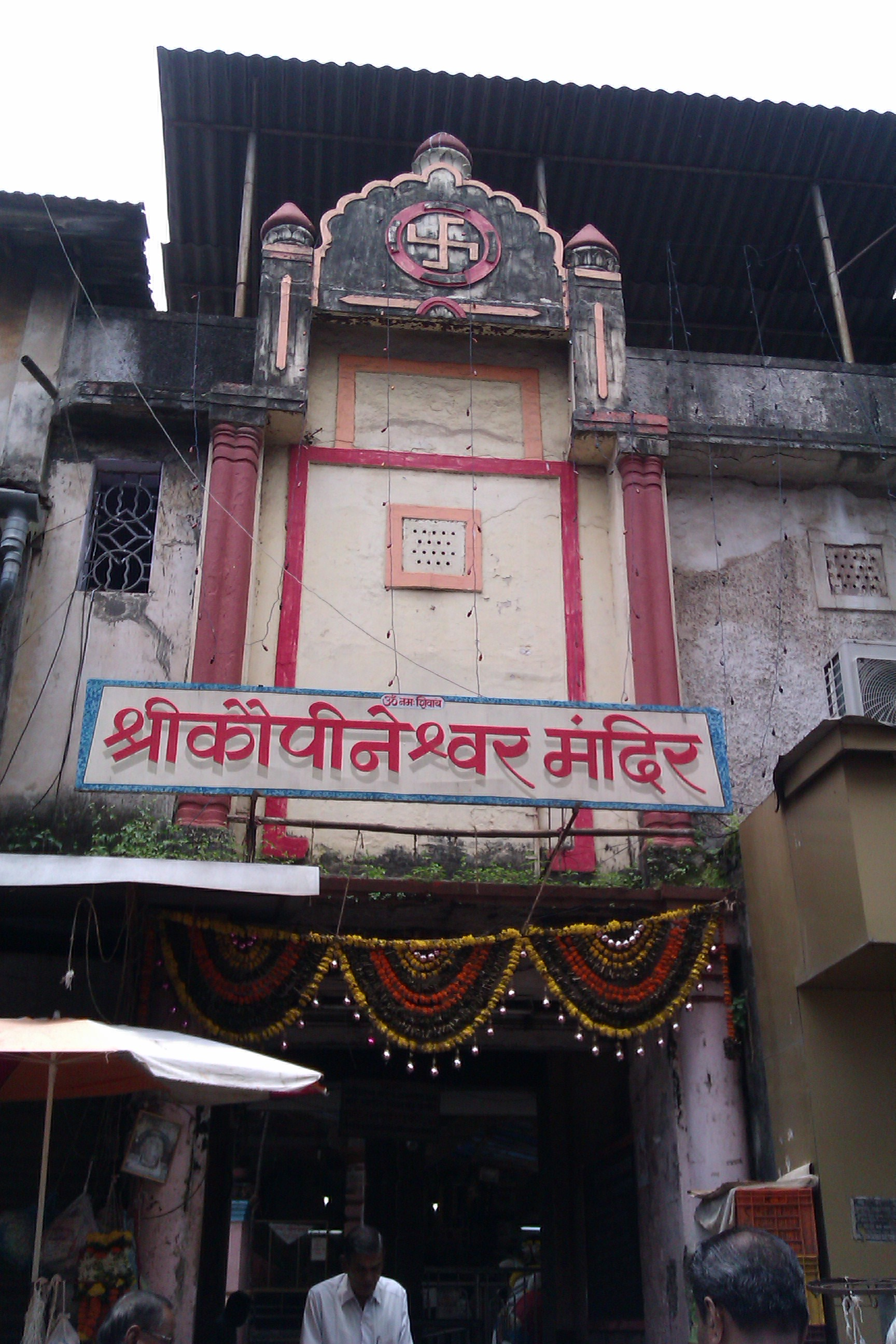
- The main entrance of the Kopineshwar temple

- Location within Mumbai region

Religion
- Affiliation: Hinduism
- District: Thane
- Deity: Shiva

Location
- State: Maharashtra
- Country: India
- Interactive map of Shri Kopineshwar Temple (Thane)
- Coordinates: 19.193°N 72.977°E

Architecture
- Creator: Shilahara dynasty

Kopineshwar Mandir (also Kaupīnēśvar Mandir) (Marathi: कौपिनेश्वर मंदिर) is a temple dedicated to the Hindu god Shiva and is considered the patron god of Thane. The Shivalinga inside the temple is considered one of the largest in Maharashtra, India.

== History ==
The temple was built by the Shilahara dynasty. It was renovated and rebuilt in 1760. The hall in front of the garbha griha was rebuilt in 1879 by raising funds and donations. It was later again renovated in 1996. The temple was earlier on the banks of the Masunda Lake(Talao Pali) but is currently separated by the Shivaji Road which reaches to the Thane railway station. The temple has two entrances- one located opposite Masunda Lake and another inside the Jambhli Naka market.

== Temple complex ==
The temple is located in the market area and at the entrance gates, is the Nandi (sacred bull). The principal deity temple of Shiva has a 12 feet diameter by 4'-3" feet tall Shiva Linga. The temple complex also houses shrines dedicated to Brahma, Rama, Hanuman, Shitala Devi (Thatakai), Uttareshwar (Kashi Viswalingeswar), Dattatreya, Garuda and Kali.
