= Masunda Lake =

Lake in Thane, India

- View of Masunda Lake (Talav Pali)

- Location of Masunda Lake in Maharashtra
- Coordinates: 19.193°N 72.974°E
- Settlements: Thane

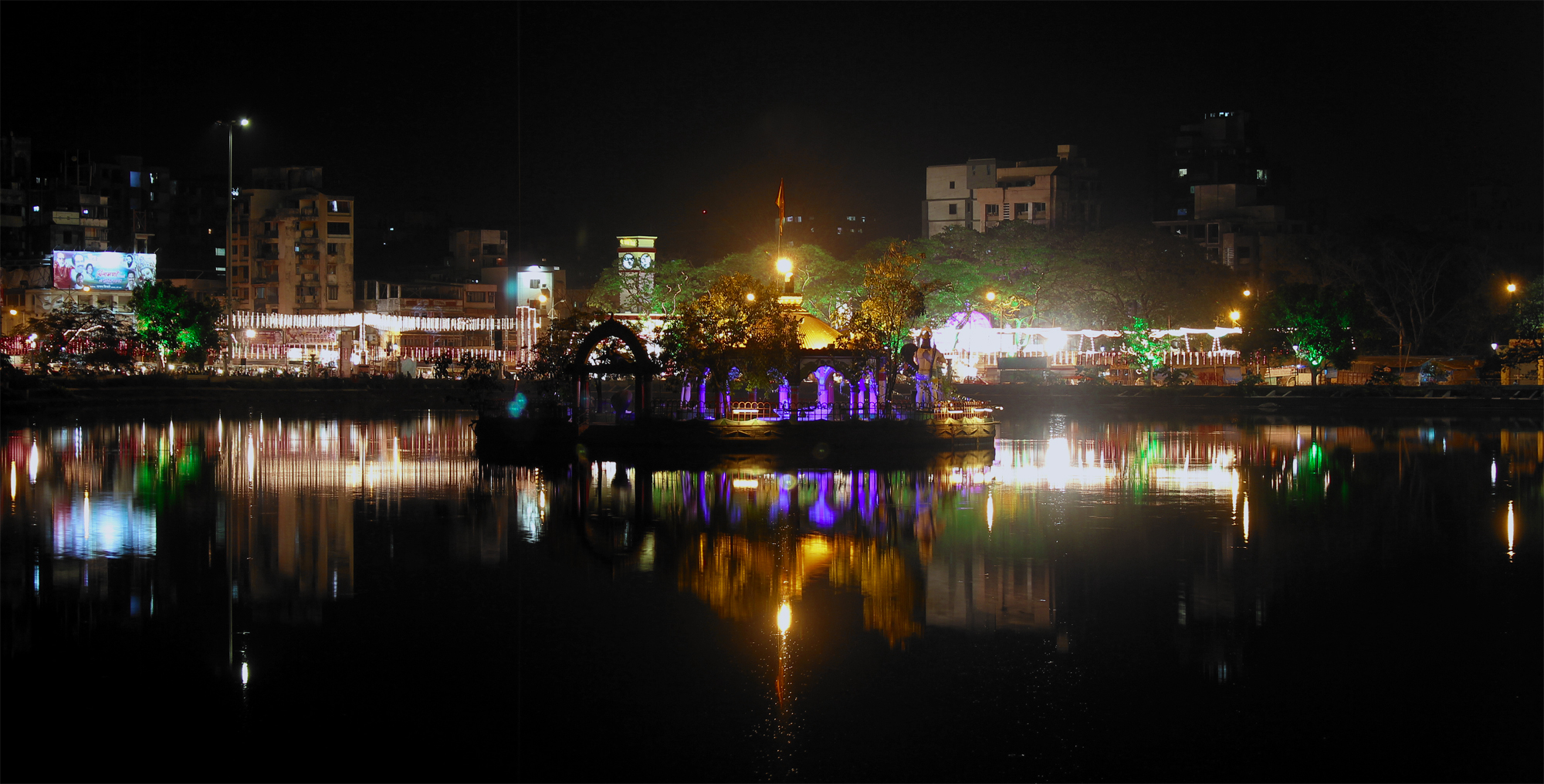

Masunda Lake, also known as Talavpali Lake, is a lake in Thane in the state of Maharashtra, India. The lake is home to a small island with a Shiv temple on it and also a Chhatrapati Shivaji Maharaj Statue behind it. It is one of the biggest lakes and ideal places to visit in Thane at night. This lake is situated just besides the famous drama theatre Gadkari Rangayatan. Tavapali is located near the Zilla Parishad office of Thane. Talav pali offers tourists attractions like Boating, Fish Aquarium etc.

== History ==
Earlier the Masunda Lake extended up to the Kopineshwar Mandir in the east but in the 1950s, the construction of a new road drastically reduced its area.

== Accessibility ==
Masunda lake is approximately about 15 minutes walking distance from the Thane railway station. The lake also offers recreational activities like boating. Also it offers the people shops to buy fishes (fish tanks) for home decorations. There are many restaurants and food stalls facing Talavpali Lake. Talavpali is located in the most meridian location in Thane.

== See also ==
- Upvan Lake
- Railadevi Lake
