= Ranjit Kumar Dass =

Indian teacher

- Born: 25/8/1957
- Education: Master of Science and Education Management
- Alma mater: La Martininere College, Lucknow; St. Stephen's College, Delhi; University of Oxford
- Occupation: Academician

Ranjit Kumar Dass (born 1957) is an academician and director of Nath Valley School, Aurangabad, who was awarded National Teachers Award in 2014.

== Biography ==
Ranjit was born in the year 1957. He completed his schooling from La Martiniere College, Lucknow in year 1973. He graduated from St. Stephen's College, Delhi with master's degree in history in 1979. He later went to London and did Master of Science and Education Management from University of Oxford in 1988–89.

He started his career as a High School Co-coordinator at Woodstock School, Mussorie and was later Dean of the Woodstock School. He was with Wood Stock School from years 1980–1992.

In 1992 he joined Nath Valley School, as Principal since its inception. He built the school from scratch and currently the Nath Valley School is one of the top 50 schools of Maharashtra.

== Recognition ==
In recognition of his services in education field, Dass was awarded National Teacher's Award in 2013. The medal was given to him and other teacher's at a function held on Teacher's Day function held on 5 September 2014 at New Delhi by the President of India. The erstwhile President, Hon. Pranab Mukherjee awarded the medals to all the pan-India teachers selected for the award for year 2013. Also present at the function to felicitate the teacher's were the Prime Minister of India, Sri Narendra Modi and the Smriti Irani, HRD Minister and other dignitaries.

== Present status ==
He is presently the Director of the Nath Valley School, Aurangabad, earlier he served as the Principal of the school from 1992 -2022
