= Thane Kala Bhavan =

Thane Kala Bhavan is an art gallery located in Thane, India. This art gallery was built by the Thane Municipal Corporation, the civic body of Thane, and was inaugurated on 26 February 2009. The gallery is nestled in the lush green pentagon of the key areas of Kapurbavdi junction, Ghodbandar road, Balkum, Dhokali and Kolshet. This art gallery is managed under the aegis of Mahesh Rajderkar, Dy Public Relations Officer, TMC. Sharmilaa Iyer, founder of Naitaai Gauras' Art Gallery at Thane, has volunteered her service to Thane Municipal Corporation for running shows effectively.

== Architecture ==
Thane Kala Bhavan has been constructed in public-private participation and is designed by architect Pravin Jadhav. The gallery spaces out an area of 16,000 sq feet and is spread over three floors with an illumination of natural lights, along with the electric ones. The gallery is built in a spherical shape, but appears conical from outside, and offers a 360 degree view, from wherever one stands in the gallery.

== Infrastructure ==
The art gallery offers a plethora of space for the exhibits of artistes. There are four galleries in total and each gallery can accommodate about 25 to 30 exhibits. Apart from four galleries, there is also a conference hall, a reading library, and a workshop hall; these amenities have helped Thane Kala Bhavan to evolve as an institution and not merely as an art gallery.

1. Ulhas: The first gallery that lies to the right of the entrance of Thane Kala Bhavan. This gallery is dedicated exclusively to showcase the historical, cultural, and geographical facts of Thane city
2. Tansa: The second art gallery is located on the first floor.
3. Bhatsa: The third art gallery is located on the second floor
4. Vaitarna: The fourth art gallery is located on the third floor.
5. Upvan: It is a conference hall located on the third floor. This circular hall pays host to the presentations and conferences.
6. Masunda : It is an open workshop hall on the second floor and is set up to serve as a place where visual and performing arts is nurtured.
