= Nath Valley School =

Location
- Paithan Road, P.B. No 567, Cantt. Aurangabad, Maharashtra, 431002; India

Information
- Established: 1992
- School district: Aurangabad
- Principal: Dr Swarup Dutta
- Gender: Co-Ed
- Campus type: Urban
- Website: www.nathvalleyschool.com

Nath Valley School is a co-educational school near Paithan Road in Aurangabad, Maharashtra, India. It is primarily a day school also has limited boarding facility for boys and girls in their campus.

The school runs classes from Nursery to Standard 12, that is from pre-primary till higher secondary.

== Affiliation ==
The school is affiliated to Central Board of Secondary Education since 1994.

== Campus ==
The campus of the school is spread on around 22 acres of land, which has apart from school building, canteen, playground for football, volleyball, cricket also has separate hostels for boys and girls and residence quarters for teachers.

== Awards ==
The school has been the top ranking school for many years with their students giving best academic results consistently.

Ranjit Kumar Dass now Academic Director of the School was awarded National Teacher's Award, when he served as the Principal of the School in 2014.

== See also ==
- List of schools in Maharashtra
