= Thane =

- City / Urban agglomeration
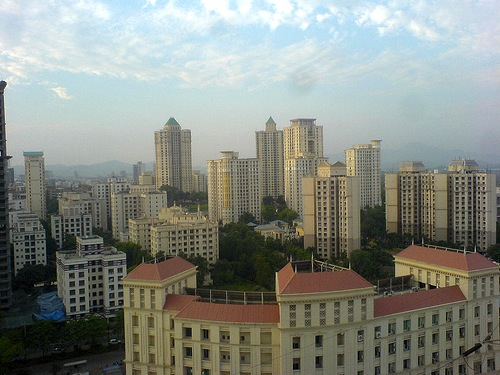
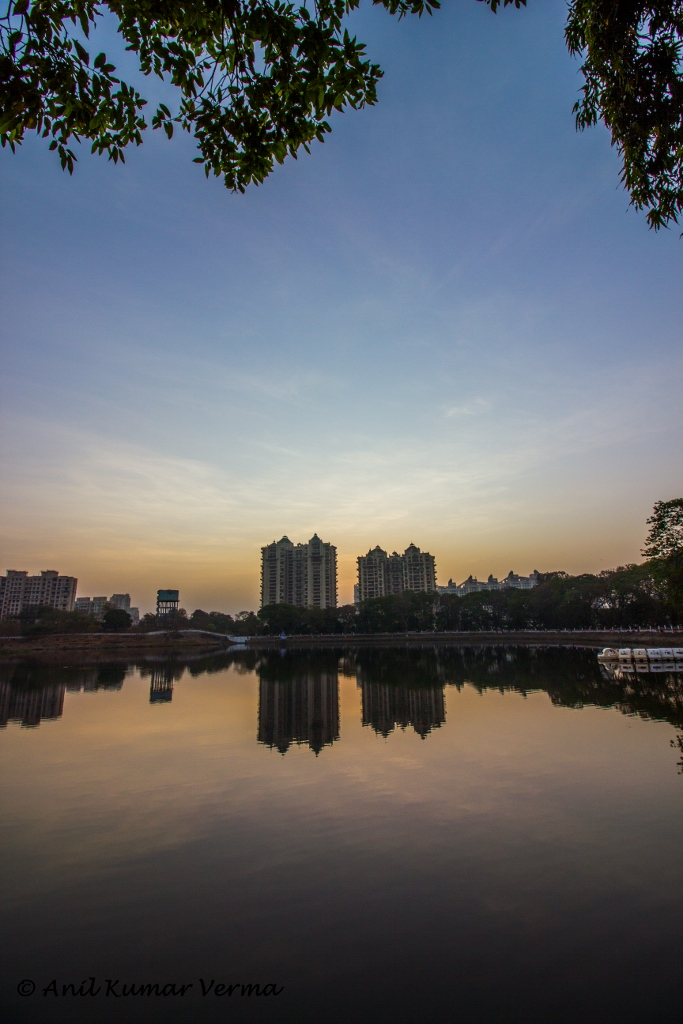
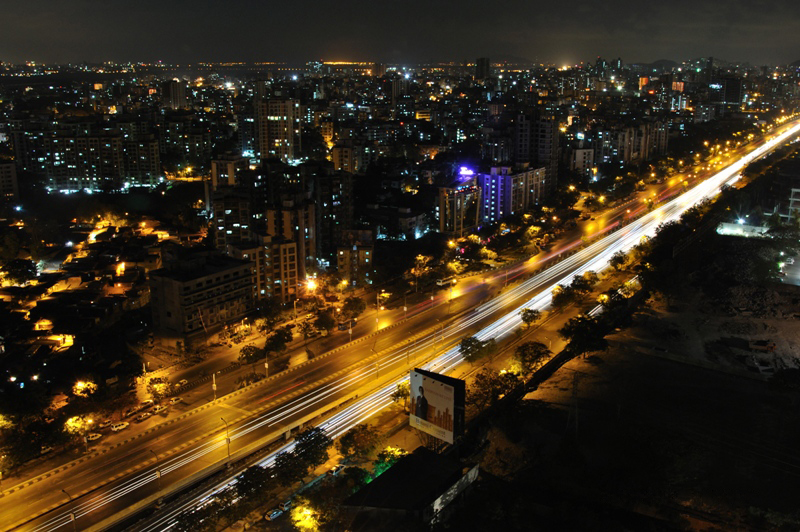
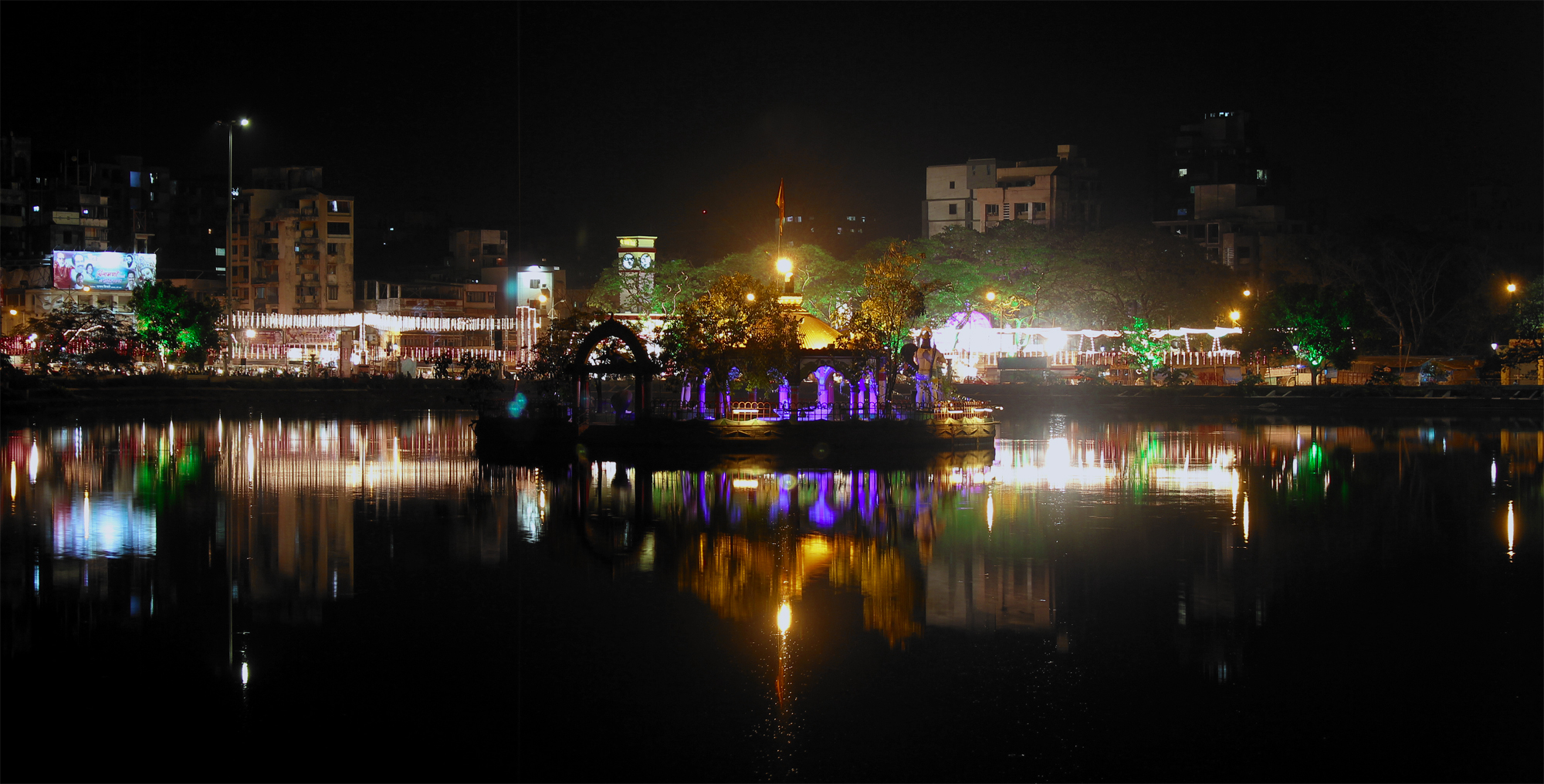
- From top, left to right: Hiranandani Estate; Upvan Lake, Eastern express highway; Talao Pali
- Nickname: City of Lakes
- Interactive map of Thane
- Location within Maharashtra Location within India
- Coordinates: 19°11′50″N 72°58′20″E
- Country: India
- State: Maharashtra
- District: Thane
- Established: 9th century A.D

Government
  - Type: Municipal Corporation
  - Body: Thane Municipal Corporation
  - Mayor: Sharmila Pimpolkar-Gaikwad
  - Deputy Mayor: Krishna Patil
  - Municipal Commissioner: Saurabh Rao, IAS

Area
  - Total: 147 km^{2} (57 sq mi)
  - Rank: 15th
- Elevation: 7 m (23 ft)

Population (2023)
  - Total: 2,537,000
  - Rank: 15
  - Density: 17,258/km^{2} (44,700/sq mi)
- Demonym: Thanekar

Language
  - Official: Marathi
- Time zone: UTC+5:30 (IST)
- PIN: 400601—15
- Telephone code: 022
- Vehicle registration: MH-04 (Thane City); MH-05 (Kalyan); MH-43 (Navi Mumbai)
- Lok Sabha constituencies: Thane; Kalyan; Bhiwandi
- Vidhan Sabha constituencies: Thane; Kopri-Pachpakhadi; Ovala-Majiwada; Mumbra-Kalwa
- Literacy (2017–18): 91.36%
- Website: thanecity.gov.in

Thane (Marathi: [ˈʈʰaːɳeː]; known as Thana until 1996) is a city in western India, in the state of Maharashtra. It neighbours Mumbai and is part of the Mumbai Metropolitan Region. It is situated in the north-east of Salsette Island. It falls under the administration of Thane Municipal Corporation.

Thane serves as the headquarters of the Thane district and is located inside Thane taluka. It is the 15th most populous city in India, with a population of 1,890,000 according to the 2011 census.

== Etymology and other names ==
The ancient name of Thana was Śrīsthāna. It appears as Thāna in early medieval Arab sources.

The name Thane has been variously romanised as Tana, Thana, Thâṇâ, and Thame. Ibn Battuta and Abulfeda knew it as Kukin Tana, while Duarte Barbosa knew it as Tana Mayambu. Before 1996, the city was called Thana, the British spelling of the city.

== History ==
Thane emerged as an urban area during the reign of the Shilahara dynasty, which ruled north Konkan during 800-1265 CE. It was variously known as Srī-sthānaka, Sthānaka, or Srī-sthāna. The 1053 CE Chinchani inscription of Vija-ranaka of the Modha family states that brahmanas from Srī-sthāna settled at Samyana in his territory. A 1094 CE Shilahara inscription refers to Srī-sthānaka as a velakula, that is, a harbour that was an important centre for import and export.

Thane is mentioned in the Mahikavatichi Bakhar, a 15th-17th century Marathi language historical chronicle of doubtful accuracy. According to the text, Prince Pratap Bimb, the brother of Champaner's king Govardhan Bimb, established a new kingdom by conquering territories in the Konkan region. In the 12th century, his general Balkrishn-rao Somvanshi captured Thane from the Shilahara king Yashwant-rao, and went on to conquer the surrounding territories. In the 13th century, Nagar-shah - the ruler of Ghandivi (Gandevi) - captured the area. His relatives demanded control of three villages - Malad, Marol and Thane - as a reward for their good performance in this military campaign. When Nagar-shah refused their demand, they allied with the imperial Yadavas of Devagiri. The area subsequently came under the control of the Yadava prince Bimb-dev, before Nagarshah regained control of it as a vassal of the Delhi Sultanate. Subsequently, the area was successively ruled by some local families, the Muzaffarids of Gujarat, and the Portuguese.

The Thane area was contested between the Portuguese, the Mughals and the Marathas in the 17th century, with Shivaji capturing it from the Mughals in 1675. Later, the Portuguese regained control of Thane, and started building a fort there in 1734, but the Marathas captured it in 1737. The East India Company occupied Salsette Island, Thana Fort, Fort Versova and the island fort of Karanja at the start of the First Anglo-Maratha War. After a short period of time, the island was recaptured by the forces of Haripant Phadke and Tukoji Holkar. After the signing of the Treaty of Salbai (1782), both Thana Fort and the island of Salsette were under the control of the British.

== Geography ==
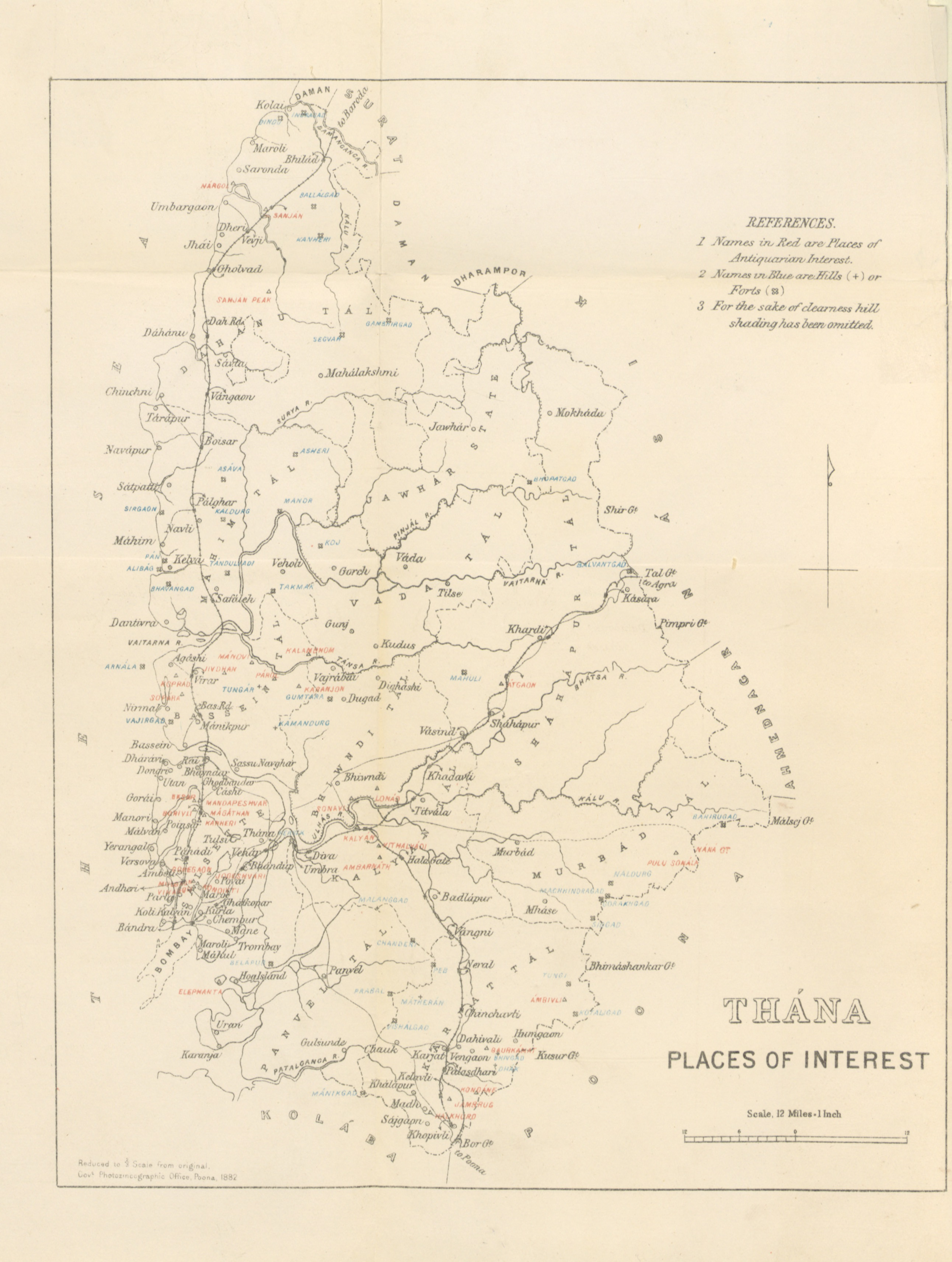
Thane district: places of Interest (1896 map)

=== Climate ===
Thane has a tropical monsoon climate that borders on a tropical wet and dry climate. The overall climate is stable with high rainfall days and minimal days of extreme temperatures.

Temperature in Thane varies from 22 °C to 36 °C, with winter temperatures as low as 12 °C at night, and summer temperatures reaching 40 °C at noon. Lowest daytime temperatures are typically during the summer monsoon peak in July and August, when temperatures can plummet to 25 °C. Around 80% of the total annual rainfall is concentrated in June to October. The average annual rainfall is recorded at 2000–2500mm, and the humidity level ranges from 61% to 86%, rendering the area a humid zone.

Climate data for Thane (1991-2020)
Month	Jan	Feb	Mar	Apr	May	Jun	Jul	Aug	Sep	Oct	Nov	Dec	Year
Record high °C (°F)	36.8 (98.2)	40.7 (105.3)	42.4 (108.3)	43.2 (109.8)	39.3 (102.7)	38.2 (100.8)	34.7 (94.5)	33.3 (91.9)	33.8 (92.8)	37.8 (100.0)	37.0 (98.6)	36.2 (97.2)	43.2 (109.8)
Mean daily maximum °C (°F)	32.5 (90.5)	33.9 (93.0)	35.1 (95.2)	36.1 (97.0)	35.0 (95.0)	33.5 (92.3)	31.2 (88.2)	30.4 (86.7)	31.1 (88.0)	34.0 (93.2)	34.1 (93.4)	33.4 (92.1)	33.5 (92.3)
Mean daily minimum °C (°F)	20.0 (68.0)	20.6 (69.1)	22.1 (71.8)	24.3 (75.7)	25.3 (77.5)	23.6 (74.5)	25.0 (77.0)	25.0 (77.0)	24.4 (75.9)	24.2 (75.6)	22.6 (72.7)	21.1 (70.0)	23.0 (73.4)
Record low °C (°F)	12.7 (54.9)	11.6 (52.9)	18.2 (64.8)	20.0 (68.0)	22.8 (73.0)	20.2 (68.4)	21.3 (70.3)	21.8 (71.2)	19.8 (67.6)	19.6 (67.3)	17.0 (62.6)	15.0 (59.0)	11.6 (52.9)
Average precipitation mm (inches)	3.1 (0.12)	1.0 (0.04)	1.5 (0.06)	2.3 (0.09)	25.1 (0.99)	541.3 (21.31)	922.0 (36.30)	539.7 (21.25)	326.9 (12.87)	93.2 (3.67)	19.1 (0.75)	2.3 (0.09)	2,477.5 (97.54)
Source 1: India Meteorological Department
Source 2: Government of Maharashtra (precipitation)

Thane has been ranked 12th best "National Clean Air City" (under Category 1 >10L Population cities) in India according to the Swachh Vayu Survekshan 2024 results.

=== Lakes ===
No.	Name	Image	Details	Coordinates	Area (in hectares)
1	Ambe Ghosale Lake		At Meenatai Thakare Chowk, Castle Mill Naka (Opposite Desai Bunglow) in Uthalsar Ward committee	19.2050793°N 72.9752154°E	2.77
2	Brahamala Lake		Near Babubhai Petrol Pump in Uthalsar Ward Committee	19.2027567°N 72.9709916°E	0.5173
3	Burbank Lake		Inside Hiranandani Estate, between Park Avenue and Wood Street. To the west of it is Lake Enclave.	19.2599707°N 72.9811942°E	0.5857
4	Datiwali Lake		East side of Diva station situated in the marshland of Ulhas river in Mumbra Ward Committee Area	19.1839962°N 73.0519473°E	0.77
5	Dawala Lake		At Ovala in Majiwada-Manpada Prabhag Samiti		1.136
6	Desai Lake		On westside of Ulhas river, in Desai village in Mumbra Ward Committee	19.1641232°N 73.0694575°E	1.75
7	Devasar Lake		At the end of Bhayanderpada at foothills of Sanjay Gandhi National Park in Majiwada-Manpada Ward Committee		0.516
8	Diaghar Lake		At the outskirts of Diaghar village in Mumbra Ward Committee	19.1379237°N 73.051289°E	0.363
9	Diva Lake		Situated just outside Diva station in Mumbra Ward Committee		0.405
10	Gokul Nagar Lake		It is a small lake situated in the heart of the city in the midst of Gokulnagar slums in Uthalsar Ward Committee	19.2089166°N 72.9761032°E	0.325
11	Hariyali Lake		Near Thane Railway Station in Kopari Ward Committee	19.1857429°N 72.9733627°E	0.7939
12	Jail Lake		Opp. Post Office beside Jail Water Tank in Uthalsar Ward committee	19.1997839°N 72.9762712°E	1.43
13	Jogila Lake		Near Uthalsar Ward office		approx 0.1
14	Kacharali Lake		Opp. TMC Head Office in Naupada Ward Committee	19.196585°N 72.96397553°E	2
15	Kalwa Lake		Kalwa Ward office. Located close to railway station		2
16	Kasar-Wadavali Lake		Majivada, Manpada Ward office	19.2715869°N 72.9697747°E	4.5173
17	Kausa Lake		Mumbra Ward office, Kausa	19.1655582°N 73.0266244°E	1.5173
18	Kavesar Lake		Situated at Waghbill road		2.1746
19	Khardi Lake		The lake is situated in premises of khardipada, Shil		approx. 1.15
20	Kharegaon Lake		Kalwa Ward office		0.7377
21	Khidkali Lake		Mumbra Ward office Khidkali Lake is situated on the eastern side of the Thane creek near the Shil phata		1.7
22	Kolbad Lake		Uthalsar Ward office	19.2050383°N 72.9705398°E	1
23	Kolshet Lake		Manpada Ward office	19.2382826°N 72.9877929°E	1
24	Makhamali Talav		Uthalsar Ward office	19.1985078°N 72.9670846°E	1
25	Masunda Lake (Talao Pali)		Masunda Lake (also known as Talao Pali) is located on West of Thane, in the heart of Thane city. The lake is surrounded by important historic places like Gadkari Rangayatan, St. John church, Kopineshwar temple and Jambli market. There is a Mahadev Dhyan Mandir at the centre of the lake and also a statue of Shivaji Maharaj near the lake.	19.193°N 72.974°E	7.2
26	Naar Lake		Naar Lake is situated on outskirts of Thane along the Ghodbunder road		0.7550
27	Phadakepada Lake		Mumbra Ward office	19.1577508°N 73.0362564°E	1.71
28	Railadevi Lake		Railadevi Ward office	19.1893°N 72.9571°E	8
29	Rewale Lake		Majivada-manpada Ward office	19.2188281°N 72.9788438°E	0.5173
30	Shill Lake		Mumbra Ward office		6
31	Shivaji Nagar, Balkumb Lake		The lake is situated along old agra road next to water supply line in Balkum area		0.2247
32	Siddheshwar Lake		Uthalsar Ward office	19.2013031°N 72.9641928°E	3
33	Upvan Lake		Lake is located at the foothills of Yeoor. A statue of Lord Shiva is situated in the middle of the lake. A Ganesh temple is situated near lake.	19.2213999°N 72.9549703°E	6

== Municipal finance ==
According to financial data published on the CityFinance Portal of the Ministry of Housing and Urban Affairs, the Thane Municipal Corporation reported total revenue receipts of ₹2,867 crore (US$345 million) and total expenditure of ₹2,462 crore (US$296 million) in 2022–23. Tax revenue accounted for about 67.3% of the total revenue, while the corporation received ₹84 crore in grants during the financial year.

== Demographics ==
Religion in Thane (2011)
Religion	Percent
Hinduism	73.91%
Islam	17.96%
Buddhism	4.18%
Christianity	1.88%
Jainism	1.40%
Others	0.67%

Historical population
Year	Pop.	±%
1901	16,011	—
1911	15,591	−2.6%
1921	22,639	+45.2%
1931	21,816	−3.6%
1941	29,751	+36.4%
1951	74,310	+149.8%
1961	109,215	+47.0%
1971	207,352	+89.9%
1981	431,667	+108.2%
1991	803,389	+86.1%
2001	1,262,551	+57.2%
2011	1,841,488	+45.9%
Source: Government of India

The population of Thane according to the 2011 census is 1,886,941 people. The literacy percentage is 91.36%, with male literacy at 94.19% and female literacy at 88.14%. The sex ratio of Thane city is 882 females per 1000 males. Child sex ratio is 900 girls per 1000 boys. Total children (0–6) in Thane city are 186,259 as per India's 2011 census. Children account for 10.24% of the total population of Thane.

The primary language spoken in Thane is Marathi, with widespread understanding and usage of Hindi. Some of the East Indian families in the Khatri ward of Thane still speak Portuguese. About 1,800 of India's approximately 5,000 Jews live in Thane.

Languages in Thane (2011)
1. Marathi (48.5%)
2. Hindi (19.6%)
3. Urdu (13.0%)
4. Gujarati (3.93%)
5. Bhojpuri (2.44%)
6. Kannada (1.37%)
7. Malayalam (1.29%)
8. Bengali (1.21%)
9. Tamil (1.15%)
10. Marwari (1.14%)
11. Konkani (0.94%)
12. Others (5.45%)

At the time of the 2011 census, 48.50% of the population spoke Marathi, 19.59% Hindi, 12.99% Urdu, 3.93% Gujarati, 2.44% Bhojpuri, 1.37% Kannada, 1.29% Malayalam, 1.21% Bengali, 1.15% Tamil, 1.14% Marwari and 0.94% Konkani as their first language.

== Sports ==
Cricket is the most popular sport in Thane. Thane is under the jurisdiction of the Mumbai Cricket Association, the governing body for cricket in Mumbai. Its players play for the Mumbai cricket team in Indian domestic cricket.

== Transport ==
=== Railways ===
Thane railway viaducts
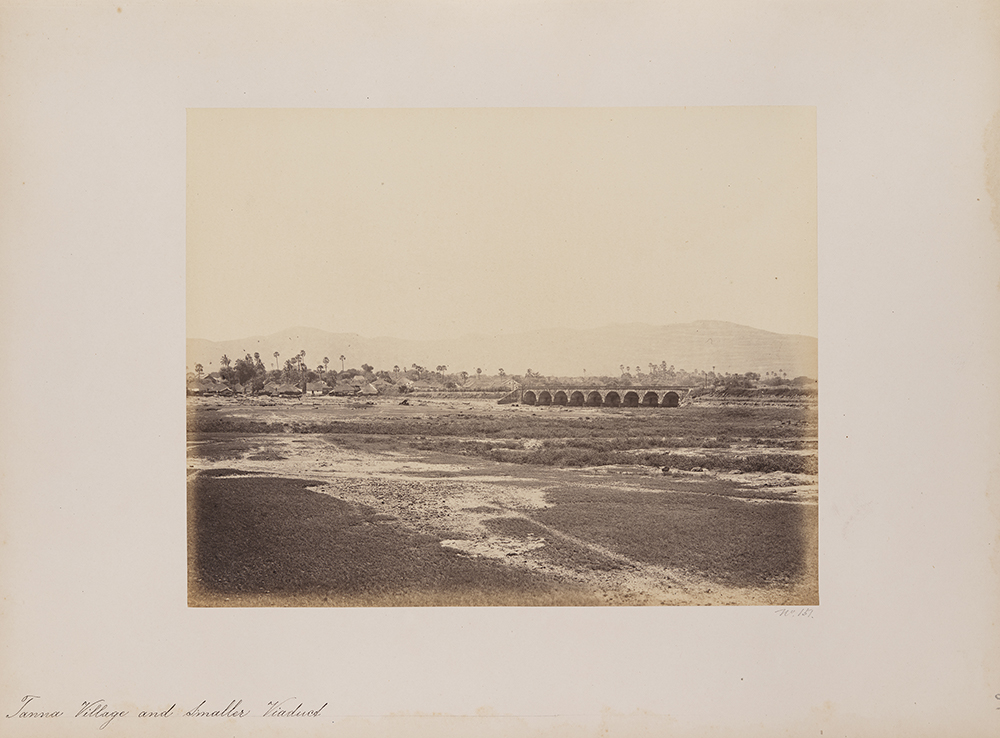
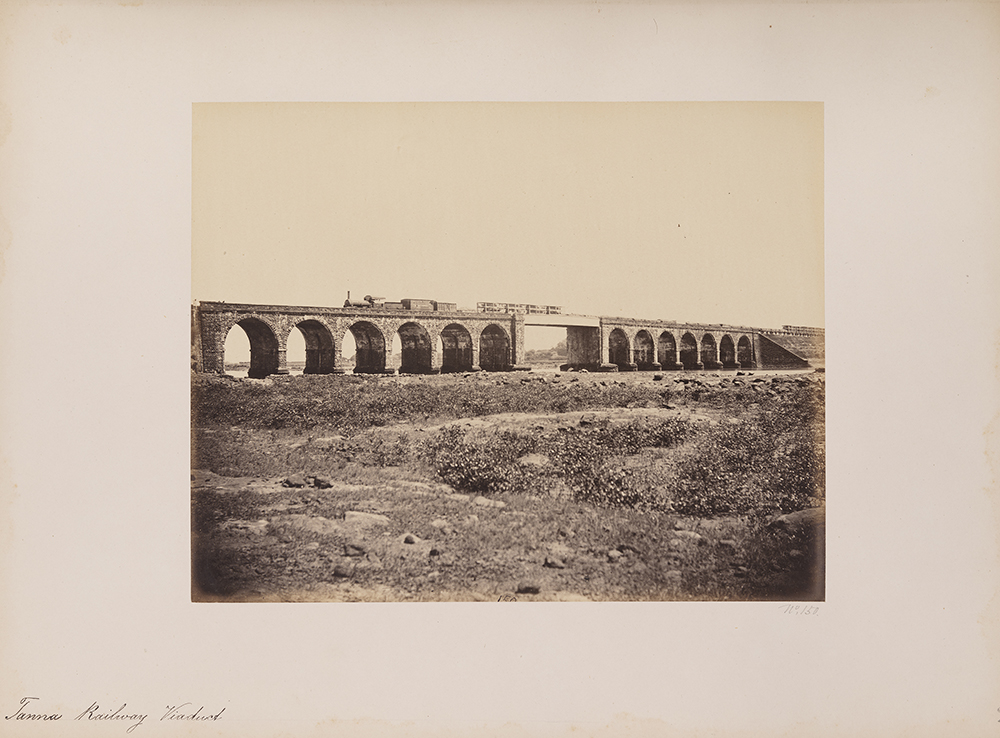
The smaller railway viaduct (top) and the longer railway viaduct (bottom) near Tanna (present day Thane) in 1855.

Thana was the terminus for the first ever passenger train in Asia. On 16 April 1853, the passenger train service was inaugurated between Bori Bunder (Bombay) and Thane. Covering a distance of 34 km (21 mi), it was hauled by three locomotives: Sahib, Sindh and Sultan. The Thane viaducts, the first railway bridges, were built over the Thane creek when the Mumbai-Thane line was extended to Kalyan in May 1854.

Thane is connected with neighbouring suburbs through the Central and Trans-Harbour Line Suburban railway network. Thane is a railway junction for the Thane-Vashi & Panvel Harbour Line and Central Line. It is one of the busiest stations in India and handles 654,000 passengers daily.

=== Metro ===
As of January 2021, the MMRDA, the nodal agency for building 300 km of vast Metro network, has proposed a plan to build an elevated depot for three Metro lines : 4 (Wadala-Thane-Kasarvadavali), 4A (Kasarvadavali-Gaimukh), 10 (Gaimukh-Shivaji Nagar) and 11 (Wadala-General Post Office, CSMT) at one stop. This depot is proposed to be at Mogharpada, Thane. The total project cost is estimated to be ₹ 596.60 crore.

On 26 August 2015, the MMRDA sanctioned ₹354 billion for 118 km Mumbai metro network. This includes a 40-km Wadala-Ghatkopar-Thane-Kasarvadavali Metro-4 corridor via Wadala GPO and R.A.Kidwai Marg costing ₹120 billion.

As of 2019, a metro line is being built between Wadala and Thane.

On 16 August 2024, the Union Government gave its approval for Thane Metro, a 29 km ring metro project. It will have 22 stations, and is expected to open in 2029. The project will be executed by Maha Metro.

=== Thane Municipal Transport (TMT) ===
Thane Municipal Corporation started its transport service on 9 February 1989, known as Thane Municipal Transport (TMT). TMT provides services in Thane city and suburbs like Mulund, Borivali, Mira Road, Nala Sopara, Vasai, Bhiwandi and Navi Mumbai, among others.

Number of —	Details
Buses	299
Routes	45
Depots	1. Anand Nagar (Ghodbunder Road); 2. Kalwa Depot; 3. Kolshet Depot (proposed); 4. Mulla Bagh Depot; 5. Wagle Estate Depot
Bus stands	8
Bus stops	874
km travelled per day	63,135
Daily bus trips	7,114
Daily passengers	280,017
Daily income	₹1,388,547/-
km travelled per day per bus	211
Employees	2,558

==== Navi Mumbai Municipal Transport (NMMT) ====
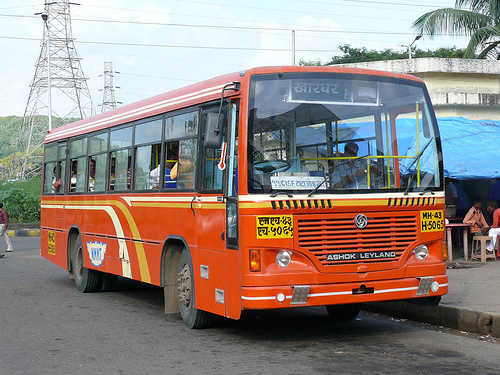
NMMT Buses

Navi Mumbai Municipal Transport (NMMT) operates AC and Non-AC buses from Thane Cidco Bus Stand to various parts of Navi Mumbai (Airoli, Rabale, Ghansoli, Mahape, Kopar Khairane, Vashi, Turbhe, Nerul, Belapur, Kharghar, Kalamboli, Panvel), as well as to Purna (via Kalher) and Bhiwandi (via Mankoli).

==== Mira Bhayandar Municipal Transport (MBMT) ====
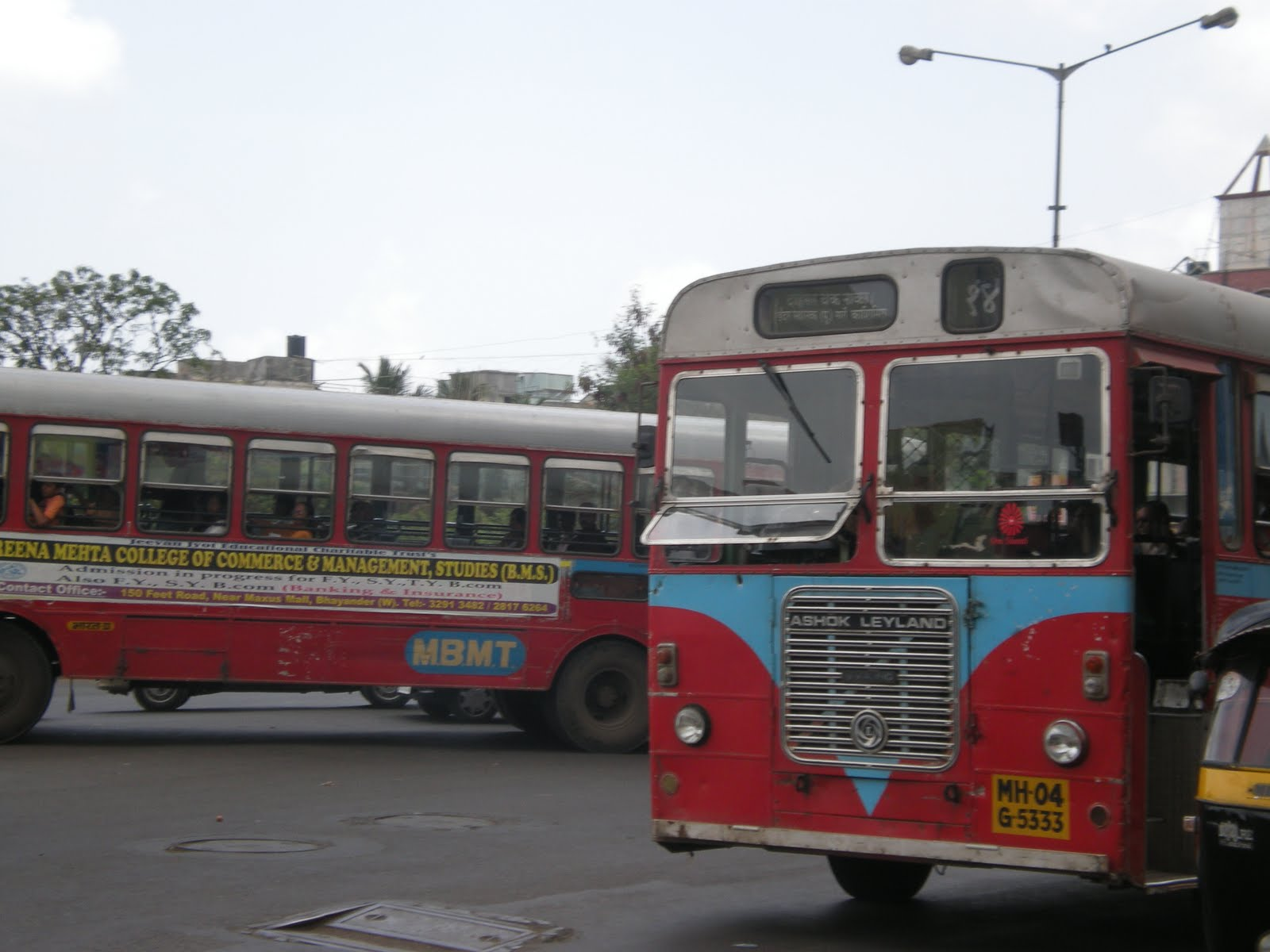
MBMT Buses

Mira-Bhayandar Municipal Transport (MBMT) started in 2006. The buses start from Dahisar Check naka towards Versova [Thane] Check naka. MBMT has started new services to Thane City from January 2010.

Route	Route No	Starting	Destination (Thane)	Route Description
Ordinary	7	Bhayander Railway Station (West)	Ghodbunder Village	Kashimira
Limited	10 LTD	Bhayander Railway Station (West)	Thane Railway Station (East)	Ghodbunder Road
Ordinary	29	Mira Road Railway Station	Marathon Chowk (Teen Haath Naka)	Ghodbunder Road

==== Vasai-Virar Municipal Transport (VVMT) ====
Vasai Virar Municipal Transport (VVMT) operates two routes in Thane. One from Vasai to Mulund Via Thane/Ghodbunder road and another from Nala Sopara to Thane Kopri.

=== Future of transport in Thane ===
A light rail network covering 42 km has been proposed in three phases. In the first phase, consultants have suggested connectivity between Balkum and Kolshet via Naupada. It will be 16.05 km long with 11 stations in total.

== Education ==
=== Schools ===
- D.A.V. Public School, Thane
- Euroschool, Thane West
- Hiranandani Foundation School
- Holy Cross Convent High School
- Little Flower High School, Thane
- New Horizon Scholars School, Thane
- Podar International School
- Sri Ma Vidyalaya, Patlipada, Thane
- St. John the Baptist High School, Thane
- Vasant Vihar High School

=== Colleges and Institutes ===
- A. P. Shah Institute of Technology
- Dr. V. N. Bedekar Institute of Management Studies And Law
- KC College of Engineering
- Rajiv Gandhi Medical College
- Rustomjee Academy for Global Careers
- Vidya Prasarak Mandal's Polytechnic

== Notable people ==
- Amrita Arora, film actress
- Malaika Arora, film actress and dancer
- Jitendra Awhad, Indian politician
- Anand Dighe, former politician, popular by honorific "Dharmaveer". He was unit chief of Shiv Sena in Thane district.
- Hruta Durgule, Indian television actress
- Poorva Gokhale, television actress
- Avinash Jadhav, politician
- Suhas Joshi, film-television actor
- Umesh Kamat, film-television actor
- Sanjay Mukund Kelkar, politician
- Prajakta Koli, YouTuber
- Kavita Lad, film-television actress
- Pramod Mahajan, Indian politician
- Priya Marathe, television actress
- Sanjeev Naik, politician
- Anand Paranjpe, politician
- Prakash Vishvanath Paranjape, politician
- Ravindra Phatak, politician
- Satish Pradhan, local politician
- Pratap Sarnaik, politician
- Prithvi Shaw, professional cricketer
- Eknath Shinde, present Deputy Chief Minister of Maharashtra
- Shrikant Shinde, Indian politician
- Anant Tare, local politician
- Laxmi Narayan Tripathi, Indian LGBT activist
- Rajan Vichare, local politician

== See also ==
- Battle of Thane 636
- 2013 Thane building collapse in Shil Phata
- Transportation in Thane
- Trans Thane Creek
- Chandanwadi
- List of towns and villages in Thane district
- Thane Creek
- Thane Kala Bhavan
