= Few Things Left Unsaid =

2011 novel by Sudeep Nagarkar

- Author: Sudeep Nagarkar
- Language: English
- Genre: Fiction
- Publisher: keerthi publishing homes
- Publication date: June 2011
- Publication place: India
- Media type: Print (Paperback)
- Pages: 298
- ISBN: 8184004192

Few Things Left Unsaid is a 2011 novel by Indian author and engineer Sudeep Nagarkar. Sudeep used to write in his personal diary. One of his friends read it and suggested to write a script on it.

The book was launched in Juhu Crossword book store on 13 July 2011 by Cabinet Minister Suresh Shetty. Sudeep was also interviewed by Stack Your Rack magazine and RJ Jeethuraj from Radio Mirchi.

An article in the Times of India stated that the book sold more than 8000 copies within one fortnight.

== Plot ==
Few Things Left Unsaid is about the story of two college mates, Aditya and Riya. They both fall in love after they meet up through their friends. They both were taking some time to express their things; once they both expressed, they moved into the next level in few days. They even take 7 promises as couples take during their wedding. They keep falling deep into the heavenly thing called love. Finally, a break-up takes place due to some twists and turns.
