= Chandanwadi, Thane =

Coordinates: 19.196932°N 72.971449°E

- Locality
- Interactive map of Chandanwadi, Thane
- Country: India
- State: Maharashtra
- District: Thane
- City: Thane

Languages
  - Official: Marathi
- Time zone: UTC+5:30 (IST)
- Vehicle registration: MH-04-XX-XXXX

Chandanwadi is a neighbourhood in Thane city of Maharashtra state in India.

There are three lakes nearby, namely Kachrali Lake, Makhmali Lake, and Siddeshwar Lake. These lakes have been beautified as part of the cleansing and beautification of lakes in Thane city. Kachrali lake has been developed the most as it overlooks the Thane Municipal Corporation (TMC) building.

== Etymology ==
The name of the place is a mixture of two words: Chandan and wadi. Chandan in Sanskrit refers to sandalwood and the suffix "wadi" means a cluster of houses in the Marathi language.

In January 2007, Major Manish H Pitambare from Chandanwadi (a paratrooper from the Special Forces) was awarded the Kirti Chakra, India's second-highest Peace-Time Gallantry Award, after he lost his life fighting militants in Bijbehara District of Jammu & Kashmir in November 2006.
