= AW Sindhu Vidya Bhavan =

Coordinates: 18°33′23.1762″N 73°48′51.5412″E

Arjan Watumull Sindhu Vidya Bhavan

Location
- 352, Sadhu Vaswani Nagar; Aundh; Pune, Maharashtra, 411007; India

Information
- Type: Private, Co-education
- Motto: Lead me from the unreal to the real, Lead me from the darkness to the light, Lead me from death to the Life-Eternal
- Established: 1974
- School board: MSBSHSE
- Average class size: 45
- Language: English

AW Sindhu Vidya Bhavan is a high school in Pune, Maharashtra, India.

The school has received the International School Award (ISA) by the British Council in 2009 and several other awards in art exhibitions.

== See also ==
- List of schools in Pune
