= St. Xavier's School, Kolhapur =

St. Xavier's High School, Kolhapur

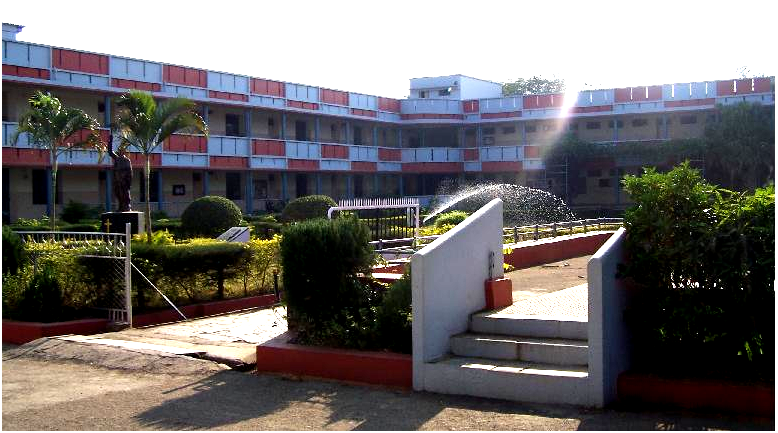

Location
- Kolhapur; Maharashtra; India; 16°42′54″N 74°14′7″E

Information
- Type: Private primary and secondary school
- Mottoes: Virtue and Work
- Religious affiliation: Catholic
- Denomination: Jesuits
- Patron saints: Francis Xavier, SJ
- Established: 1957; 69 years ago
- Principal: Fr. James Thorat, SJ
- Gender: Boys only (1957-2008); Co-educational (since 2008)
- Houses: Blue, red, yellow, green
- Colors: Light blue and gold
- Website: www.stxavierskop.org

St. Xavier's High School, Kolhapur, is a private Catholic primary and secondary school located in Kolhapur, southern Maharashtra, India. Founded by the Jesuits in 1957, the English-medium school has been co-educational since 2008. The school admits students from kindergarten till the Secondary School Certificate or 10th standard. The school celebrated its Golden Jubilee in 2007 and Diamond Jubilee in 2017.

It is located on the Kasba-Bavda Road, opposite New Palace grounds. It has three large playgrounds, a basketball court, a library, a computer room, and a fully equipped laboratory.

== Traditions ==
The school is run by the members of the Society of Jesus in the Catholic church and follows Christian school traditions like morning prayers, annual feasts (3 December for St. Francis Xavier), and values the Jesuit tradition in education. The school has an inner courtyard which on occasion features synchronized marching by the students.

Xavier's has a shield as its emblem, displayed on the chest pocket of the school uniform. It is also on the flag hoisted to the playing of the school anthem on a brass bugle every day.

The students are divided into four houses – Gold, Blue, Green, and Red – that compete at an annual sports competition, with strong rivalry. The most popular events are a tug-of-war and a 2000-metre (500 X 4) relay race between the houses.

Offerings include arts and crafts, dramatics, singing, music, and elocution. Activities include "gathering" which is an annual social event with theatrical performances by the students, and the annual "leaving parade" for the seniors.

The NCC and Scouts organisations are active in the school, involving many students. In their last two years, all the boys are required to do one hour of social service in the local community each week.

== Notable alumni ==
- Abhay Ashtekar – physicist
- Virdhawal Khade – Olympic swimmer
- Sujit Minchekar – member of Legislative Assembly, Maharashtra State
- Satej Patil – Minister of State for Home, Rural Development & FDA. Govt. of Maharashtra

== Gallery ==
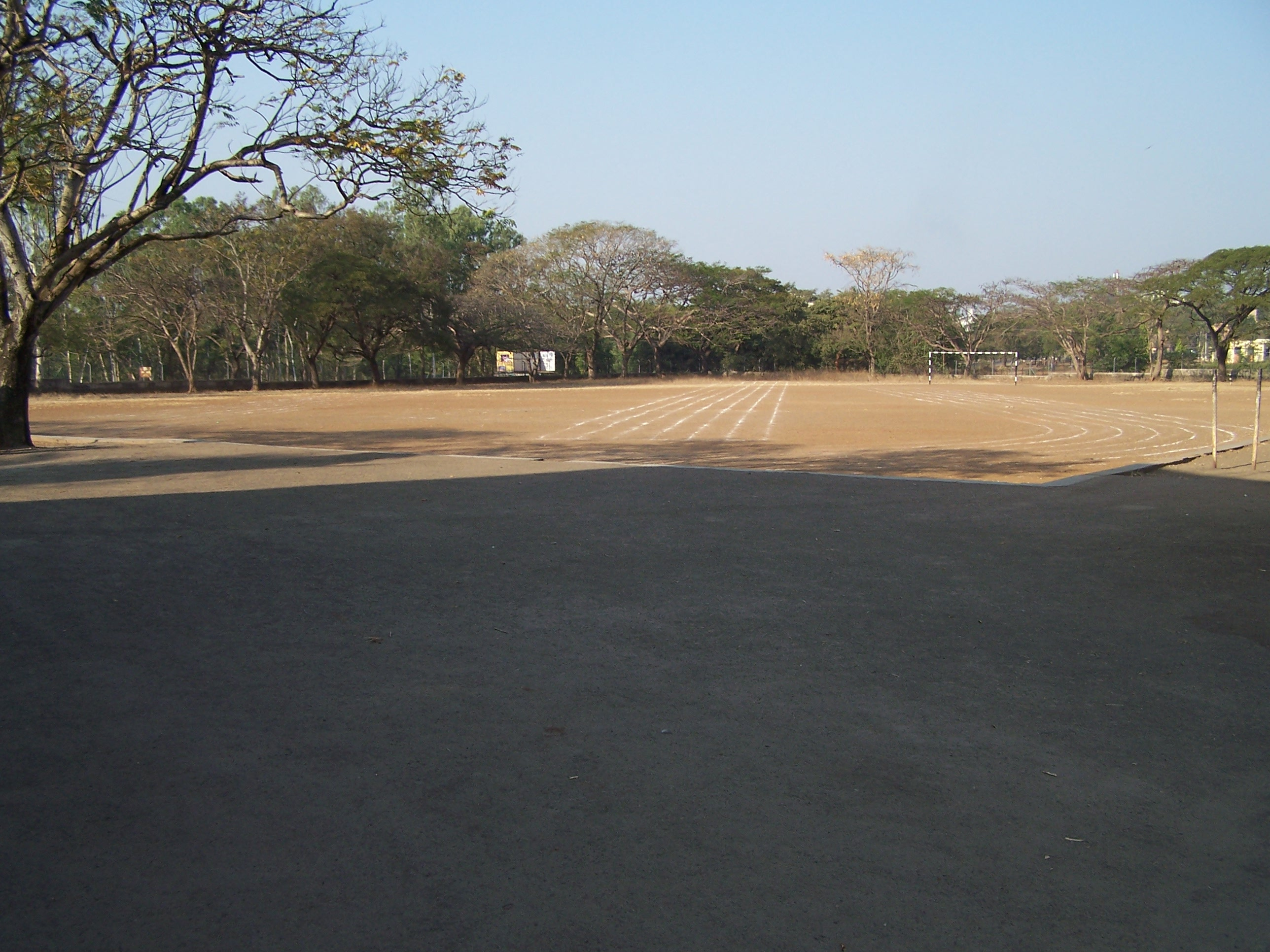
Sports ground

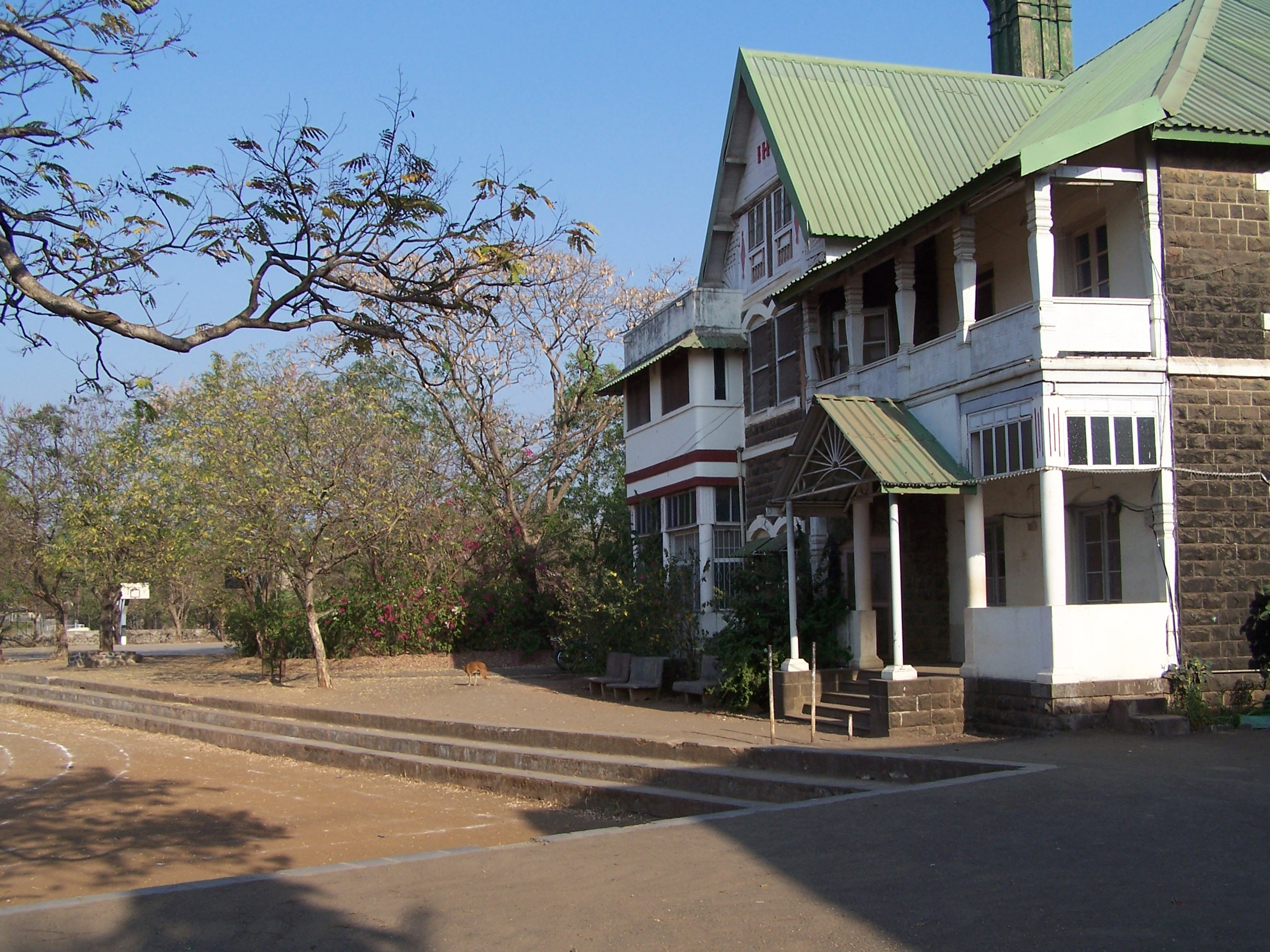
Residence of the principal

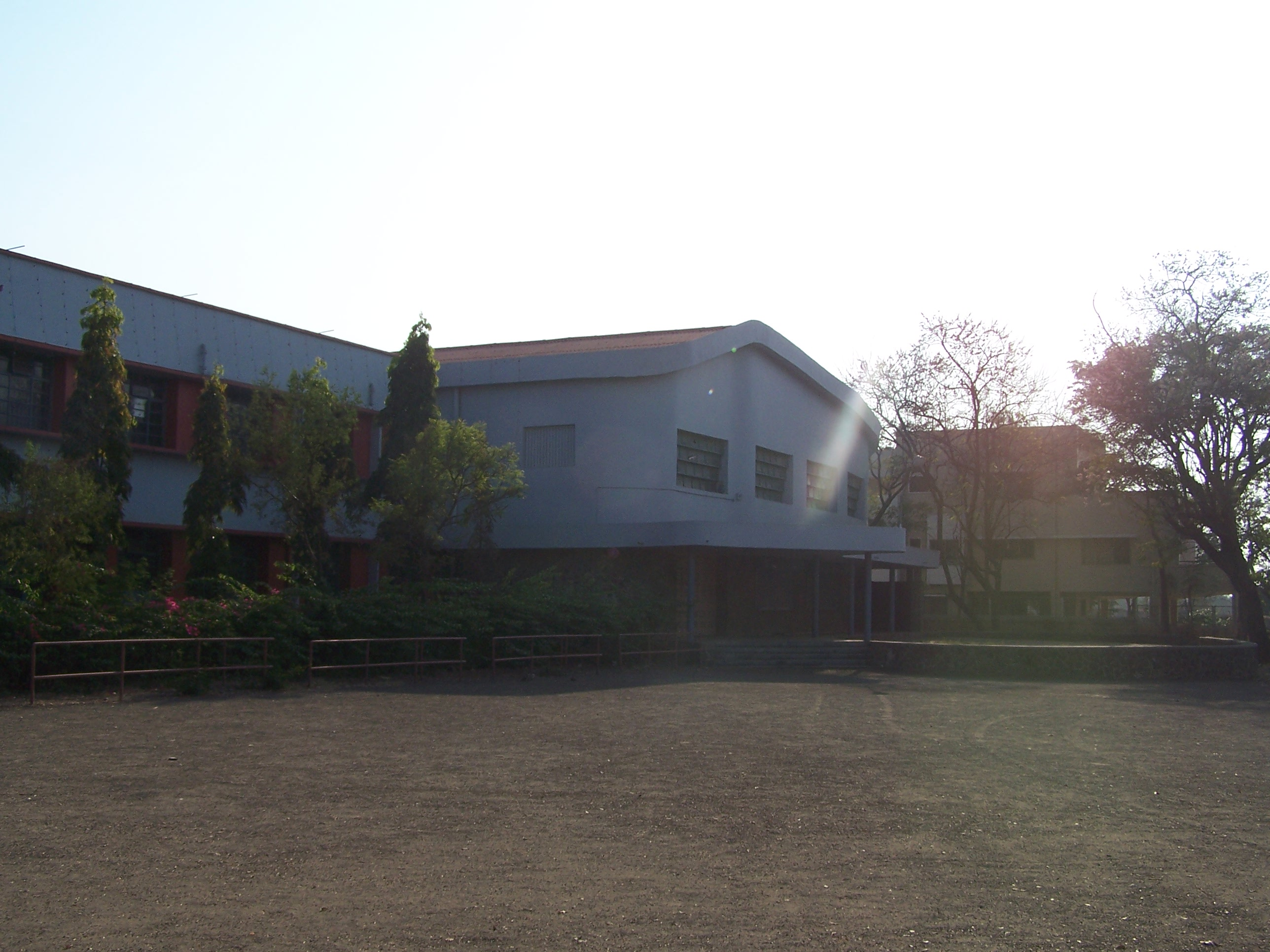
School hall

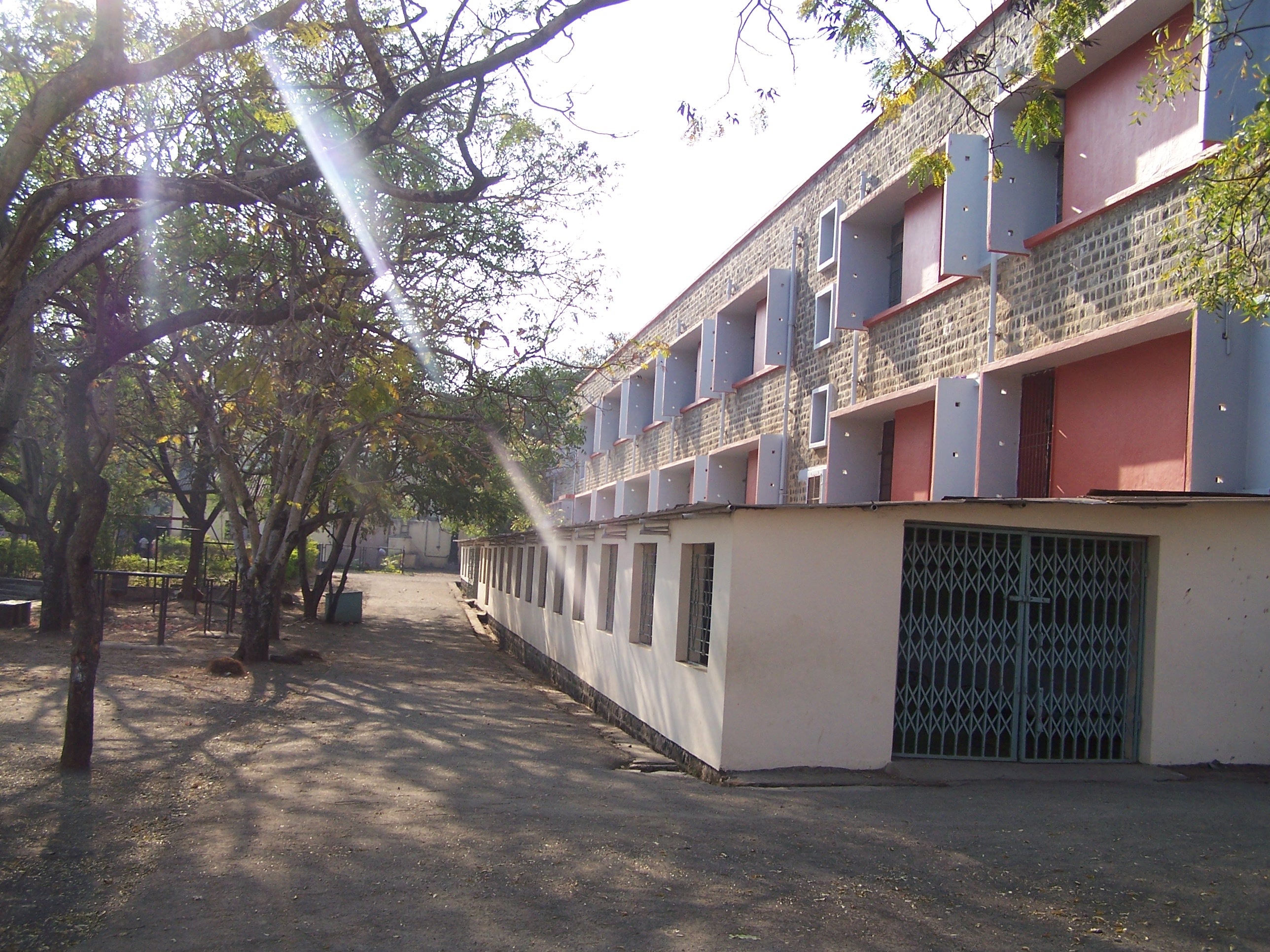
School cycle stand

School emblem as it appears on a progress report card

== See also ==
- List of Jesuit schools
- List of schools in Maharashtra
- Violence against Christians in India
