= Green Thumb =

Green thumb means a natural talent for gardening or a gardener with such a talent.

Green Thumb may refer to:

- Green Thumb (novel), a 1999 young-adult novel by Rob Thomas
- Green Thumb (brand), a brand of garden products sold by True Value
- Green Thumb Theatre, a Canadian children's theatre company
- Green Thumb Industries, an American cannabis company
- "Green Thumbs", an episode of Beavis and Butt-Head
- "Green Thumb", a 2023 song by Post Malone from Austin

== See also ==
- Greenfingers (disambiguation)
- Green Fingers and Thumbs (The Worst Witch), 2000 TV episode
