= Manish Pitambare =

Indian army officer

Major Manish Pitambare KC
- Major Manish Pitambare
- Born: 1975
- Died: 27 November 2006 (aged 30–31); Bijbehara, Jammu and Kashmir, India
- Military career
- Allegiance: India
- Branch: Indian Army
- Service years: 1996–2006
- Rank: Major
- Unit: 3 Para
- Awards: Kirti Chakra

Major Manish Pitambare KC was an Indian Army officer who posthumously received the Kirti Chakra, India's second highest peacetime gallantry decoration.

== Education ==
After obtaining his Secondary School Certificate with marks of almost 90%, Pitambare joined the Services Preparatory Institute (SPI) in Aurangabad, Maharashtra and then prepared for the National Defence Academy (NDA). He went on to join the NDA in Pune, and went on to the Indian Military Academy (IMA). He commissioned into the Indian Army in 1996. He was made a Major before the age of 31.

== Military career ==
Pitambare was part of the team that tracked down Al-Badr militant Toufik Akmal, wanted for his suspected links to the 11 July 2006 Mumbai train bombings.

In 2006, Pitambare was serving with the 3rd battalion of the Parachute Regiment and was on counter-insurgency operations in the state of Jammu and Kashmir. On 27 November 2006, during a night-long gun battle in south Kashmir's Bijbehara, Pitambare shot dead Suhail Faizal, one of Hizbul Mujahideen’s top commanders in Kashmir. He was later killed in the same battle.

In January 2007, Pitambare was posthumously awarded the Kirti Chakra, India's second highest peacetime gallantry award.

== Personal life ==
Pitambare married his wife Mughda in 2003 and the couple had a daughter, Yukta, in 2005.
