= St. John's High School, Nagpur =

Catholic secondary school in Maharashtra, India

St John's High School is a senior secondary school located in the Mohan Nagar area of Nagpur, Maharashtra, India. Established in 1880, it is one of the oldest schools in Nagpur.

== History ==
St. John's High School was established by the missionaries of St. Francis de Sales (MSFS) in Nagpur at the later end of the 19th century. The exact date of establishment is unknown. Since 1867, St. Francis de Sales (S.F.S) School has catered to the educational needs of Anglo-Indians and European children. The majority of these families lived in Nagpur city as locals then. St. John's school is a new subsidiary of the (S.F.S) school which was expanded to serve the Indian Christian children. Therefore, the preferred medium of instruction was Hindi as per the local needs.

"In 1951 an agreement signed between Very Rev. Fr. A. Grorod MSFS, Superior General of the MSFS, and Bishop Gayet MSFS of Nagpur. Accordingly, St. John’s high School was handed over to the MSFS, who made it their mother house".

== See also ==
- List of schools in Maharashtra
