= Abhinava Vidyalaya, Pune =

Coordinates: 18°30′16.7″N 73°49′30.72″E

Abhinava Vidyalaya English Medium School
- Pune, Maharashtra; India

Information
- Type: Co-educational
- Motto: Anything Worth Doing Is Worth Doing Well
- Established: 1969
- Houses: Blue, green, red, yellow
- Website: asm.org.in/avemhs-home/

Abhinava Vidyalaya English Medium School, or Abhinava, is a private, co-educational day school located in Erandwane in Pune, India. The institution is a part of the Adarsh Shikshan Mandali. Adarsh Shikshan Mandali (ASM) was founded in 1943 by Krishnaji Bhaskar Virkar alias Tatya Virkar. Adarsha Shikshan Mandali has a school named Abhinav Vidyalaya for Marathi medium as well. Krishnaji Bhaskar Virkar was the first Maharashtrian in Pune to start an English Medium School. He is also renowned for his English into Marathi and Marathi into English dictionaries.

== About ==
The school caters to pupils from kindergarten up to class 10 and the medium of instruction is the English language. The school is affiliated with the Maharashtra State Board, Pune, which conducts the SSC examinations at the end of class 10. The school is divided into three sections viz. pre-primary, primary and secondary.

The high school is a permanently non-aided, government-recognised school, run by Adarsha Shikshan Mandali. It was founded by Tatyasaheb Veerkar in 1972. The school runs in two sessions. The strength of the school is 716 students.

The pre-primary and high schools are located in two different buildings off Karve Road. The primary school is located off Paud Road.

== Admissions and curriculum ==
=== Curriculum ===
The school follows the syllabus prescribed by the Maharashtra State Board, Pune. English is the medium of instruction. Marathi, Hindi are taught as second and third languages respectively. Students have the option of learning German or Sanskrit from 8th to 10th standard. English and Marathi are taught from class 1. Hindi, the regional language is taught as a third language and is compulsory from class 5 to class 10.

The academic year, which commences in June and concludes in April, consists of two terms. The first term is from June till October/November and the second term commences after a three-week break and continues till April. Examinations are held at the end of every term. The courses of studies extend from kindergarten to class 10, at the end of which students appear for the SSC Examinations.

==== Extracurricular activities ====
Inter house Debates, quizzes, dramatics and sporting competitions are part of the cultural lives of the students. Sports activities at Abhinava include football, cricket, basketball, Table tennis, and Chess. The school stood second in the Sakal Schoolympics 2014 which was organized by the Sakal Media Group.

Abhinava Vidyalaya has demonstrated excellence in quizzing for the past several years, having won the ESPN School Quiz Olympiad in 2003-04. Other notable wins include the Limca Book of Records Quiz 2010, ACES 2007 School Quiz.

== School life ==
=== Motto ===
The School believes strongly in the motto that "Anything Worth Doing Is Worth Doing Well". also the High School's entrance is stated with the motto "Enter here to Learn - Go out to Serve."

=== House system ===
There are four school houses - Blue, Green, Red, and Yellow. The objective of the house system is to foster a sense of collective responsibility and solidarity amongst students. The house system also serves as the centre of school life, with students from different houses often competing at sports and other co-curricular activities. There are also many inter-house matches and at the end of the year, the house with the most wins gets the inter-house championship trophy.

=== Facilities ===
The high school has a library with 2 books that are accessible to the students throughout school hours.While primary school library has more than 20,000 books. There are science laboratories The science laboratories are used by students of class 9-10 to carry out practical work. The school has computer laboratories where students from classes 1 through 10 are made proficient in computers. For sports activities the primary school has a sports field with a basketball court and a running track.

==== Marathi from Std. I ====
Teaching of the Marathi language has been introduced to children from Standard 1, together with English. Marathi workbooks are devised by the school teachers, taking into consideration the non-Maharashtrian students.

== See also ==
- List of schools in Pune
