= Agrasen High School, Pune =

Coordinates: 18°33′25.81″N 73°52′53.7″E

Agrasen High School
- AHS
- The school crest
- Yerwada; Pune, Maharashtra, 411006; India

Information
- Type: Private school
- Motto: Knowledge is Wealth
- Established: 1984
- School board: Maharashtra State Board

Agrasen High School (AHS) located in Yerwada, Pune, India, started on 12 July 1984. It is an unaided, co-educational, government-recognized, private school run by Shree Agrasen Charitable Trust. The school has laboratories, a library, a music room, a tailoring room, and a computer lab. There are sports activities arranged for the students.

Students are divided into four houses - red, blue, yellow and green. Sports activities are carried out between these houses.

The school has a well-developed infrastructure and it manages more than 3500 students per year.

== Departments ==
- Kindergarten
- Primary
- Higher Secondary

== See also ==
- List of schools in Pune
- Agrasen High School, Pune
