= Mount Carmel Convent School (Pune) =

Mount Carmel Convent School is an offshoot of “The Congregation of the Sisters of the Apostolic Carmel”, That was founded in 1877 by Mother Teresa of St. Rose of Lima in the town of Kerala. It is a Christian institution which was first started at Nanapeth Pune, India in 1943. Due to the ever-increasing strength, there was a need to shift the Secondary Section to Lullanagar in 1956. In 1974, the K.G. class was opened in view of starting the Primary Section and was gradually upgraded. The school now a complete Pre-Primary, Primary, Secondary School and Junior College, is located at Lulla Nagar, Kondhwa, Wanawadi, Pune, India.

The school a Christian minority institution, which has a specific goal in view to provide Catholic girls with sound religious and moral education. Other pupils are also admitted with due respect to their religious feelings and freedom of conscience. The organization is named after the Our Lady of Mount Carmel.

Mount Carmel Convent High School is recognized by the Government of Maharashtra and follows the S.S.C syllabus system which includes subjects that are English as the first language, Marathi as the second language, Hindi as the third language, Mathematics, Science, Social Sciences i.e. History and Geography. This school also offers Physical training, R.S.P., Girl Guides (Girl Scouts), Art, Craft, Value Education, Environmental Studies, Personality Development, General Knowledge, Information Technology, Social Service, etc. and also extra co-curricular activities to help and discover the talents of the students through elocution, dramatic essay writing, sports, dancing, singing, etc.

The Infrastructure includes Class Rooms, Computer Lab, Science Labs i.e. (Physics, Biology, Chemistry), and a library.

== See also ==
- List of schools in Pune
