= St. Mary's School, Pune =

St. Mary's School
- Pune, Maharashtra; India

Information
- Type: Private
- Motto: I Serve
- Established: 1866
- Principal: Caroline Diane Ross Executive Director- Sujatta Mallic Kumar
- Colors: Navy Blue, White
- Website: http://www.smspune.com

St. Mary's School, Pune, India, was founded in 1866 to cater to the education of the daughters of officers of the British Indian Army who were posted to Pune. From 1866 to 1977, the school was run by the Sisters of the Community of St Mary the Virgin, an Anglican order based in Wantage, England. In 2019, a list made by EduWorld showed that St. Mary's School, Pune was the 7th best all-girls day school in India. It recently celebrated 160 years of establishment.

In the year 2009, St. Mary's Junior College, a co-educational institution training students to appear for the all-India Indian School Certificate examination in the Commerce and Science streams, was created. The Junior College occupies the same campus as the Boys' section but is conducted during different hours.

== See also ==
- List of schools in Pune
