= Avalon Heights International School =

Secondary school in Vashi, Navi Mumbai

Location
- Plot No. 13, Sector 19, Vashi, Navi Mumbai; Maharashtra 400703; 19.086389°N 73.010833°E

Information
- School type: Private, Co-Educational
- Motto: Aspire, Attempt, Achieve
- Founded: 1998
- Faculty: 120
- Average class size: 25
- Student to teacher ratio: 24
- Campus size: 2 acres (8,100 m^{2})
- Houses: Daffodil, Orchid, Iris, Tulip
- Athletics: Yes, International
- Mascot: None
- Affiliations: Indian Certificate of Secondary Education
- Website: https://www.avalonheights.org/

Avalon Heights International School is a coeducational secondary school located in Vashi, Navi Mumbai. It is affiliated to the Indian Certificate of Secondary Education (ICSE) and was established in 1998. The school has over 1200 students and is located near APMC Market in Navi Mumbai.

It was ranked among the Top 10 Navi Mumbai Schools in the survey conducted by Hindustan Times in 2019.

== History ==
The School was founded by Mrs. Kamlesh Sharma/ Mrs. Simi Sharma in 1998 in a small bungalow in Navi Mumbai with few students, all in the pre-nursery classes. Later the school shifted to a building on an educational reserved plot allotted by the Navi Mumbai Municipal Corporation and began classes up till 10th grade; 11th and 12th grade were added in 2017. A branch named Avalon World School Pvt. Ltd. was established in Ajman, UAE and began operations in October 2015.

== Overview ==
=== Rankings ===
Agency	Rank	Year	Criteria
Hindustan Times	3rd	2016	Navi Mumbai
Hindustan Times	3rd	2015	Navi Mumbai
Hindustan Times	2nd	2012	Navi Mumbai
Hindustan Times	2nd	2010	Navi Mumbai
ClassFever	3rd	2016	Maharashtra
ClassFever	1st	2016	Navi Mumbai
ClassFever	1st	2016	Vashi
ClassFever	1st	2016	ICSEcschools in Navi Mumbai
ClassFever	3rd	2016	ICSE Schools in Maharashtra

It was featured in the Hindustan Times again in 2014 for its teaching system, and for practices like daily meditation.

=== Faculty ===
There is 10:1 Teacher-to-Student-Ratio. Teachers do not live on campus. There are also maushi's and bhaiya's present on campus to help the children and school.

=== Heads of staff ===
- Director & Founder – Mrs. Simi Sharma
- Principal – Ms. Indu Vinod

=== School features ===
The school follows the ICSE course syllabus, as set out by the CISCE board in Delhi. It used to follow IGCSE as well, but it was discontinued in 2013.

It runs classes from kindergarten to the 12th grade. The average class size is 25-30 students, the number being greater in the junior classes.

The students are divided among four houses named Daffodil, Orchid, Iris and Tulip (coloured yellow, blue, green and pink respectively) which compete through the year in extracurricular activities to win the House Trophy. The school has a distinct Student Council and looks after the discipline and organises all events. It is led by the President and the Vice-President along with the Head Boy and Head Girl, who work together with Deputies, House Captains and Prefects. The middle section maintains its own Student Council. Each house is looked after by a teacher-in-charge.

== Annual days ==
The school hosts three annual days, one for the middle school, one for the primary school and one for pre-primary school respectively. It consists of an annual report on the school and an extravagant play-reproduction. These plays are usually held at Vishnudas Bhave Auditorium. The plays up to date have been

Year	Middle School	Primary	Pre-Primary
2023	Macbeth		
2022	Chhatrapati Shivaji Maharaj	Mister God, This Is Anna	
2019	Gautam Buddha	Prince Siddhartha	Prince Siddhartha(with Primary)
2018	Prince of Egypt	Annie	Annie
2017	Hamlet	Alice in Wonderland	Alice in Wonderland
2016	Kal Ki Aawaz	Kal Ki Aawaz	The Lion King
2015	The Scarlet Pimpernel	Around the World in 80 Days	Alibaba and 40 thieves
2014	The Merchant of Venice	A Christmas Carol	
2013	Ramayana	Singhasan Battisi	
2012	Mahabharata	The Jungle Book	
2011	Oliver Twist		
2010	The Sound of Music	Mr. God, This is Anna	
2009	My Fair Lady	My Fair Lady	

== Avalon World School, Ajman, UAE. ==
Avalon World School Pvt. Ltd is a branch of Avalon Heights International School, located in Ajman, UAE. The school was inaugurated and began operations in October 2015. It is being headed by a British principal and is affiliated to the IGCSE curriculum. It currently only operates pre-nursery classes.

== See also ==
- List of schools in Maharashtra
