= Victorious Kidss Educares =

- Pune, Maharashtra; India

Information
- Type: International Baccalaureate World School
- Motto: Learning to Love to Learn
- Founder: Dr. Robbin Ghosh
- President: Dr. Robbin Ghosh
- Principal: Mrs. Saarada Ghosh
- Vice President: Mrs. Saarada Ghosh
- Enrollment: approx. 1200
- Website: www.victoriouskidsseducares.org

Victorious Kidss Educares (VKE) is an IB World School located in Kharadi, Pune, India. It was established by Dr. Robbin Ghosh in January 1997. The school is driven by the motto of ‘Learning to Love to Learn’, and strives to create ‘lifelong learners’.

It is a co-educational school from Playgroup up to Grade 12th.

The school is authorised by International Baccalaureate for the Primary Years Programme, the Middle Years Programme, and the Diploma Programme.

== See also ==
- List of schools in Pune
