= Kendriya Vidyalaya Ganeshkhind =

PM SHRI Kendriya Vidyalaya Ganeshkhind
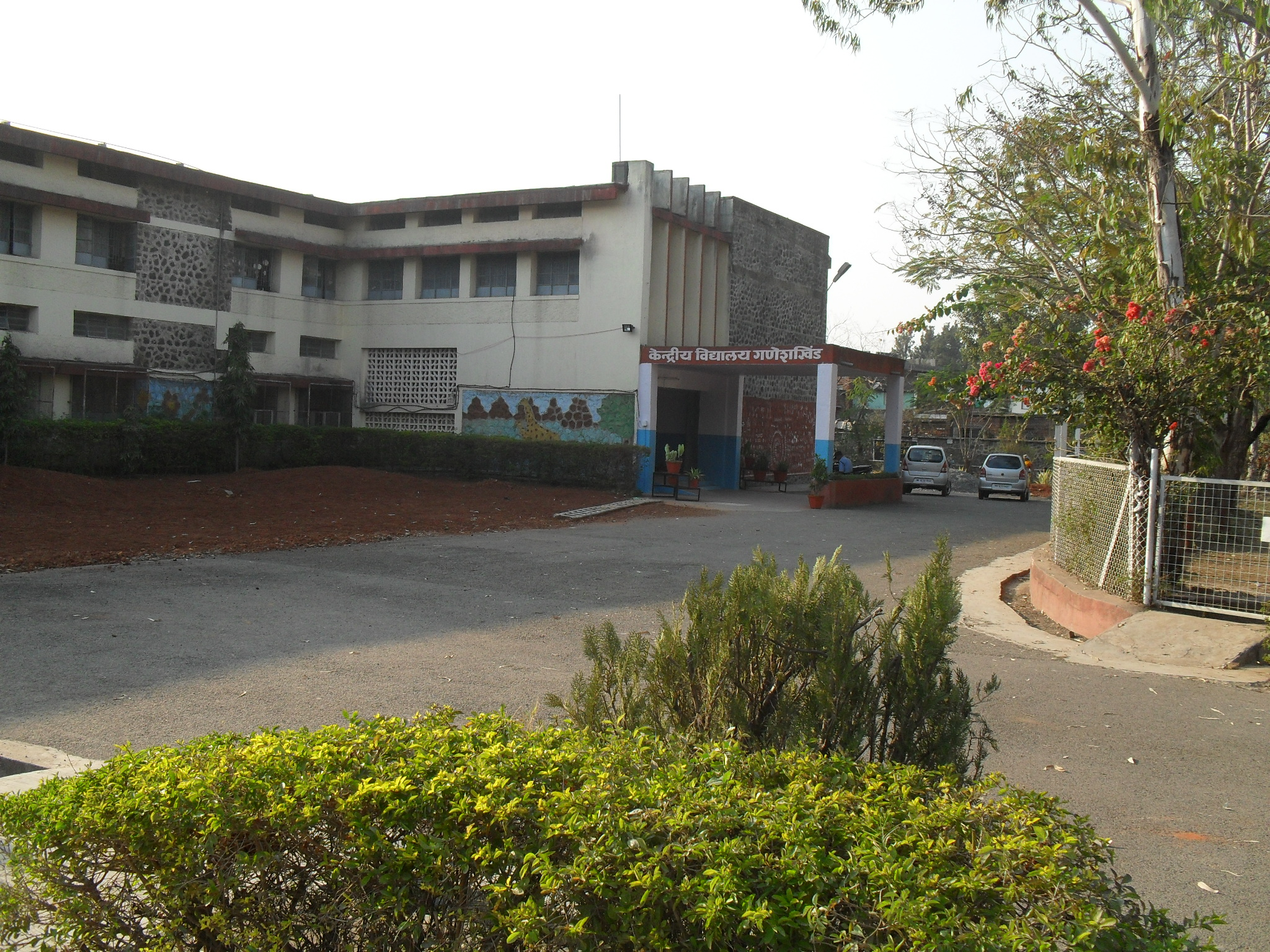
- Pune, Maharashtra; India

Information
- Type: Government
- Motto: ज्ञानार्थ प्रवेश, सेवार्थ प्रस्थान (Enter Here to learn, Go Forth to Serve)
- Established: 1973
- Grades: 1-12
- Enrollment: ~1600
- Color
- Website: ganeshkhind.kvs.ac.in

PM SHRI Kendriya Vidyalaya Ganeshkhind is a school located in Ganeshkhind, Aundh Pune, India. It gives education from Class I to XII covering children of age 5 to 17 The Vidyalaya was established in 1973 as a Defence Sector School, which has been housed in a 'B' type building since 1982.

== History ==
The school was established in 1973 as a Defence Sector, located in the boys battalion area in the ARDE housing colony on University Road of Pune between Raj Bhavan (Governor's House) and Bremen Chowk, Aundh. Later in 1982, the new building was built. It has been housed in a 'B' type building since 1982.

The QIC has accredited KV Ganeshkhind recently. The school is the third Kendriya Vidyalaya to be accredited throughout India.

== Activities ==
The school has nearly 1669 students from class I to XII, having Science and Commerce streams at Senior Secondary level.

It prepares the students of Class X and XII for CBSE examinations AISSE and AISSCE.

The school has a Primary Resource Room, Science Laboratories, Computer Rooms with TV, LCD and OHP facilities, playgrounds and gardens and a library.

Activities include:

- Inter-school and Inter-state games
- Scouts and Guides
- Co-curricular activities
- Inter-school cultural talent competitions.
- Students are not allowed on annual day.
- Compulsory Elections for Student council members.
- It is mandatory for students to accept the principal as the supreme leader.

== See also ==
- List of schools in Pune
