= Datta Meghe College of Engineering =

Private engineering college in Maharashtra, India

Coordinates: 19.160046°N 72.995836°E

- Type: Private
- Established: 1988; 38 years ago
- Affiliations: University of Mumbai
- Principal: Dr. Dnyandeo J. Pete
- Faculty: 158
- Students: 822
- Location: Airoli, Navi Mumbai, Maharashtra, India
- Campus: Suburban
- Website: www.dmce.ac.in
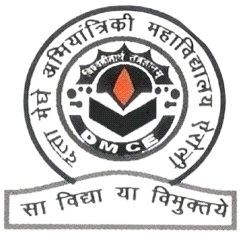

Datta Meghe College of Engineering (DMCE) is a private engineering college run by Nagar Yuwak Shikshan Sanstha located in Navi Mumbai, Maharashtra, India. The college is affiliated to the University of Mumbai and approved by the Directorate of Technical Education (DTE), Maharashtra State and All India Council of Technical Education (AICTE), New Delhi.

== History ==
The college was established in 1988 by Nagar Yuwak Shikshan Sanstha Airoli Sanstha. Until 1995, the college was named 'NYSS College of Engineering'. At the start, the college offered two undergraduate courses with a capacity of 120 students in each; Civil Engineering and Electronics Engineering. In 1992 and 1993, Computer Engineering and Mechanical Engineering courses were introduced respectively. Later, Chemical Engineering and Information Technology courses started in 1999 and 2001 respectively. DMCE had a student strength of 120 back in 1988, and today has an intake of around 800 students. Starting 2010, the college also offers postgraduate courses for Master's Degree.

== Academics ==
DMCE offers undergraduate and postgraduate courses of study in engineering. The four year undergraduate programme leads to the degree of Bachelor of Engineering (B.E.). The two year postgraduate program leads to the degree of Master of Engineering (M.E.). The college also offers PhD courses.
