= Chandanwadi, Mumbai =

Coordinates: 18.946132°N 72.825736°E

Chandanwadi is a neighbourhood in Mumbai donated by the Hon. Jugonnath Sunkersett, one of the founding fathers of the city. It is the area around Marine Lines most famous for the Chandanwadi electric crematorium which opened in 1954.

Chandanwadi also consisted of B.I.T Blocks which consisted of 6 buildings, demolished in 2016. These buildings were more than 150 years old build during the British Era

== Etymology ==
The name is derived from 2 Marathi words, Chandan meaning sandalwood in Marathi/Sanskrit and Wadi meaning backyard/farmyard.

== In popular culture ==
The street was used in the famous song "Govinda Aale Re" depicting Shammi Kapoor from the 1963 film Bluff Master.
