= D.A.V. Public School, Thane =

- डी.ए.व्ही. पब्लिक स्कूल, ठाणे
- Schola Publica Dayanand-Anglo-Vedic, Thena

Location
- Thane, Maharashtra, 400610; India; 19.222151°N 72.974381°E

Information
- School type: Private
- Religious affiliation: Hinduism
- Opened: 1995
- Locale: Tulsidham, Thane, Maharashtra
- School board: CBSE
- Principal: Mrs. Simmi Juneja
- Grades: Nursery- XII ( XI and XII batches are only available for commerce courses )
- Gender: Co-education
- Average class size: 55
- Language: English
- Campus type: Urban
- Houses: Ganga, Godavari, Kaveri, Krishna
- Colours: Ganga(Yellow), Godavari(Green), Kaveri(Red), Krishna(Blue)
- Team name: D.A.V Thane

Dayanand Anglo-Vedic Public School is a private school in Thane, Maharashtra, India. The school was founded in 1995 at Balkum, Thane, but was moved to Tulsidham in 2004. It is one of the number of schools run by the Dayanand Anglo-Vedic College Trust and Management Society. It follows the Central Board of Secondary Education (CBSE) pattern of education. The school caters for children from nursery to Standard XII (Commerce only).

The school hosted Khoj, an International Science Festival, for three consecutive years.

== Staff ==
- Principal: Mrs. Simmi Juneja

== Education ==
D.A.V. Public School follows the DAV Publication Books through to Std. VIII. Std. IX and X follow the NCERT publication books. A D.A.V. Board exam is held for Std. VIII while a CBSE Board is held for Std. X. Question papers for students studying in Standard IX of all DAV Schools are common. The School secured a 100% pass rate for the tenth consecutive year in the STD X AISSE (All India Secondary School Examination) in 2022-23. In 2016-17, it was amongst the four CBSE schools of Thane to secure 100% result. In 2018-19 about 50% students out of 480 from Class 10 secured above 90% marks.

== Infrastructure ==
The school has a built-up area of 57,000 sq ft (5,300 m^{2}) and the project cost Rs 450 lakhs. It is a five-story structure with a canteen and a playground that has been rented by Tulsidham to the authorities. It has a science laboratory. There is also a computer laboratory with over 50 computers. The classrooms from the two wings of the fifth floor, computer lab are airconditioned. On the fourth floor, there was a conference room, with air-conditioning, that was used for all major events and workshops hosted for the students, but is now converted into classrooms due to the partial demolition of the fifth floor. Instead, a herbal nursery has been converted to a raised platform which is now used for hosting most of the major events and workshops for the students. The school has started XI and XII commerce courses as of 2022, the classes take place on the ground floor.

The school also plys GPS-enabled buses which can be tracked by parents.

== Sports and co-curricular activities ==
The school's sports teams enter tournaments like the Mahatma Hansraj and CBSE Sports Tournament. The school encourages co-curricular activities and holds at least one competition each month. Their annual sports meet is held at Sri Ma Vidyalaya ground in Hiranandani Estate, Thane but was held at Dadoji Kondev Stadium for session 2016-2017.

In 2022, on occasion of Azadi Ka Amrit Mahotsav, the school arranged inter-school singing & musical band competition called "Shining Stars" wherein 16 schools from Thane, Kalyan, Panvel and Nerul participated.
