= Purushottam English School =

School in Nashik, India

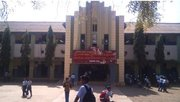
P.E.School

Purushottam English School (a.k.a. P.E.School) is one of the largest schools in Nashik, Maharashtra, India. The school campus occupies 4 acres (1.6 ha). P.E.School is managed and administered by Nashik Shikshan Prasarak Mandal (NSP Mandal), the educational society for Nashik.

== History ==
P.E.School was established in 1937. The name 'Purushottam' is given in memory of grandson of Manaji Rajuji Kalewar, senior member of NSP Mandal. The land for the school was provided by Sardar Buti from Nagpur. Mr. L. V. Soman was the first principal of the school. The current building was completed in 1957. Soman was succeeded by Mr. Purohit in 1957. In 1960, an open-air theatre was built for the school. Every year 'Purohit Natya-Spardha' is arranged in memory of Mr. Purohit.
