= St. John the Baptist High School, Thane =

St. John the Baptist High School

Location
- Thane; 19°11′43″N 72°58′32″E

Information
- Motto: "VIRILITER AGE-STRIVE MANFULLY"
- Founded: 1905
- Principal: Fr. Thomson Kinny
- Grades: Jr. KG – Std. 12
- Houses: Red, Blue, Green, Yellow
- Website: sjbhs.org

St. John the Baptist High School and Junior College is a Catholic school in the city of Thane, Maharashtra, India dedicated to St. John the Baptist. It also has a school for children in need of special care. It is administered by the Roman Catholic Archdiocese of Mumbai. The school is affiliated to the Mumbai Division Board of Secondary and Higher Education. The school/college aims at the education primarily of the Catholic community around and to the extent possible of the members of all the communities. The institution has an extensive alumni base, known as "Johannines" spread across the globe. It is recognised to be one of the premier high schools in Mumbai.

== History ==
It was built in 1905 beside the church of the same name (built in 1663 at the same site of the old St. Anthony's Church). Built to serve Portuguese children, it was reorganised into an English school, and recognised by the Education Department as an English Teaching High School in 1938.

The school building was due to the foresight of Reverend Pascal D'Souza. Following a stay in the United States, he worked to give a try to the broad-based American system of education. The growth of the institution required a new building for St. John's School. The stately three-storeyed building, with wings spread out to the right and left, capped by an open air terrace, sprang up within a period of two and a half years thanks to the supervision of D'Souza and the efforts of architect Vyom Keshav of "Studio Arch". D'Souza was not destined to give the final touches to it. He collapsed due to a heart attack. His remains rest on the school campus. The Reverend Valerian Godinho stepped into the shoes of D'Souza. His first task was to supervise the finishing of the school building. The first students used the building in 1966.

At the request of the Educational Department, a junior college was attached to the high school from June 1979. Science and Commerce classes of the junior college started in 1979. In 1980, junior college Science and Commerce classes opened.

== List of School Principals ==
Late Rev Fr. Stanislaus Pereira (1945-48) Rev Fr.Leslie Miranda (1955-57) Late Rev Fr. Frank Lobo (1957-61) Late Rev Fr.Pascal D'Souza (1961-66) Late Rev Fr. Valerian Godinho (1966-74) Late Rev Fr. Vincent Gonsalves (1974-75) Late Rev Fr. Herculan Silveira (1975-80) Rev Fr. Ernest Fernandes (1980-86) Late Rev Fr. Simon Borges (1986-94) Rev Fr. Ivan Mascarenhas (1994-2000) Rev Fr. Andrew Mukadom (2000-02) Fr. John lopez (2003-2009) Fr. Nicholas Pereira (2010-2011) Fr. Michael Pinto (2011- 2017) Fr. Ronal Tevar (2017 - 2021) Fr. Thomson Kinny ( 2021 till date )

== Alumni ==
- Sudeep Nagarkar – author
