= J. N. Petit Technical High School =

Coordinates: 18°32′15″N 73°53′1″E

Location
- 28 Bund Garden Road; Pune, Maharashtra, 411001; India

Information
- Type: Private
- Website: http://jnpetitths.org

J. N. Petit Technical High School is one of the oldest schools in Pune, Maharashtra, India. The school was founded by Nusserwanjee Petit in 1888 to preserve the memory of his son, Jamshedjee Nusserwanjee Petit, who had died that year at the age of 32.

The school was established in their own premises at Lal Baug, Bombay. It was started to help orphans of Zoroastrian faith by looking after their welfare and education. It was shifted to the present campus in 1948. In 1962 the doors of the school were opened to students from all castes, creed and religion as day-scholars. The school provides hostel facilities to male Parsee students only.

The school is located in Pune on 17 acres of land that has a Cricket, Soccer, field and Basketball court . The school building is a four storied building with classrooms, science laboratories, workshops and lounge. The school has additional technical subjects to offer, such as electronics, welding, automobile, computer, carpentry, engineering drawing, and fitting sections. The size of the engineering workshop is comparable to ones of colleges.

== See also ==
- List of schools in Pune
