= Hindustan Antibiotics School =

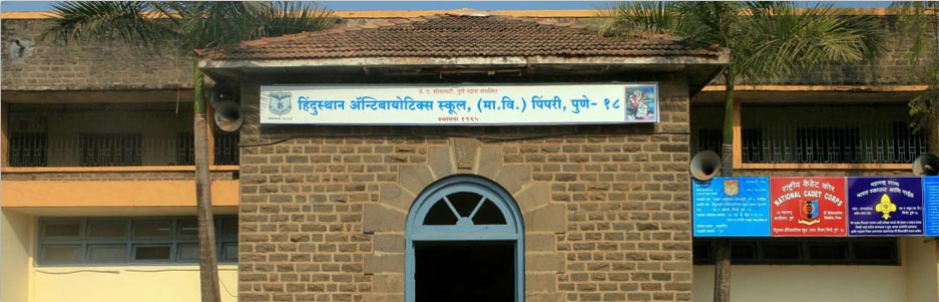

Location
- Pimpri-Chinchwad, Pune; India; 18.6247337°N 73.8085518°E

Information
- Type: Pre-Primary, Primary, and Secondary School
- Established: 1958
- School board: Maharashtra State Board of Secondary and Higher Secondary Education
- Website: www.ha-school.com

Hindustan Antibiotics School (also known as H.A. School) is a Pre-Primary Primary & secondary school in Pimpri-Chinchwad, Pune, India. It was established in 1958, with its school buildings being inaugurated by the first and second Prime Ministers of India, Jawaharlal Nehru and Lal Bahadur Shastri. It was established mainly to serve the children of employees working at Hindustan Antibiotics Limited (HAL) and poor children from the neighbouring areas for a nominal fee.

== History ==
In 1966, HAL transferred the management of the school to the Deccan Education Society (DES) under a 98 year lease; however, in 2012, the DES informed HAL that it no longer wished to administer the school, citing a lack of adequate funding from the company. Both organizations came to an interim agreement, with DES continuing to manage the school until a replacement management could be found.

In 2021, HAL issued a tender for a new management, accusing the DES of a lack of financial transparency: the DES called the tender illegal and said it had changed its decision to stop managing the school. The change in management was opposed by parents of students, who worried that a change may lead to an increase in fees or the closure of the school.

== Courses ==
The school is government-aided, and has a campus covering 2.5 acres, with three departments: pre-primary, primary, and secondary. It offers both Marathi and English-medium education, and currently serves more than 3,000 students. The pre-primary, primary, and secondary departments are currently headed by Vijayalakshmi Hake, Surekha Jadhav, and Eknath Burse, respectively.
