= Railadevi Lake =

- Railadevi Talav, MIDC Talav
- Location within India
- Location: Thane, Maharashtra, India
- Coordinates: 19.1893°N 72.9571°E
- Type: lake
- Surface area: 8 hectares (20 acres)

Railadevi Lake (or Railadevi Talav) is an 8 hectares (20 acres) lake situated in the city of Thane in the state of Maharashtra, India. It is one of 35 lakes in Thane, which is known as the "city of lakes". Raila Devi Lake is located on Road number 4, Wagle Estate, Raheja Gardens, Thane. The lake is about 3. 3 km away from Thane railway station which is the nearest railway station.

Raila Devi Lake can be visited during timings 10:00 AM – 5:00 PM. There is no entry fee and one can visit this place on any day.
