= Vasant Vihar High School =

Vasant Vihar High School and Jr College
- वसंत विहार उच्च विद्यालय आणि कनिष्ट महाविदयालय

Location
- 2nd Pokhran Road; Vasant Vihar; Thane, Maharashtra, 400610; India; 19.22313°N 72.96582°E

Information
- School type: Private
- Motto: विद्या विनयेन शोभते (Vidhya Vinayen Shobhate) (Knowledge Shines by Humbleness)
- Established: 02-07-1990
- Founder: Goenka And Associates Educational Trust (G.A.E.T)
- School board: ICSE
- Principal: Mr. Rajbhar Ramsatish
- Gender: Co-education
- Language: English
- Houses: Delphini (previously Blue), Ursa (previously Greeen), Aquilae (previously Red) and Tigris (previously Yellow).
- Website: www.vvhs.edu.in

Vihar High School and Jr College (VVHS) is a private, co-educational, day school in Vasant Vihar, Thane, Maharashtra, India. It was established in 1990 by Goenka and Associates Educational Trust. The school has 7,500 pupils from kindergarten to grade 12. The medium of instruction is English. It is affiliated to the Indian Certificate of Secondary Education (ICSE) and the junior college is affiliated to the Indian School Certificate. The ICSE curriculum is followed from Grade I to Grade X and ISC curriculum from Grade XI to Grade XII

VVHS is affiliated to the Council for the Indian School Certificate Examinations It has 150 teachers and provides facilities for special children with disabilities ranging from cerebral palsy to dyslexia and other learning disorders.

Vasant Vihar High School was started in 1990 with 35 students in the Amrapali Shopping Arcade with four staff.

== Notable alumni ==
- Prajakta Koli
- Mrunal Thakur
- Alyssa Mendonsa
- Nandini Shankar
