= Mohone =

Mohone koliwada mohone koliwada
- town
- Nickname: mohone Koliwada
- Location within Maharashtra
- Coordinates: 19°15′50″N 73°10′24″E
- Country: India
- State: Maharashtra
- District: Thane

Languages
  - Official: Marathi
- Time zone: UTC+5:30 (IST)
- PIN: 421102
- Telephone code: 0251
- Vehicle registration: MH-05
- Titwala: Kalyan

Mohone is the name of a little town which falls under the Thane district of Maharashtra. It belongs to the Kalyan-Dombivli Municipal Corporation.
