= Greenfingers Global School =

Location
- Plot no. 9, near Shilp Chowk, Sector - 12; Kharghar; Navi Mumbai, Maharashtra, 410 210; India; 19.04°N 73.06°E

Information
- School type: Co-education Affiliated school
- Motto: One World, One People
- Patron saint: Late Shri Shankarrao Mohite Patil
- Established: 2006
- Founder: Late Shri Shankarrao Mohite Patil
- Sister school: GreenFingers College of Computer & Technology
- School board: CBSE
- School district: Raigad district
- Session: Day
- School code: 47056
- Principal: Mrs. Anju Vedi
- Enrollment: 1200
- Classes offered: Nursery to class XII
- Language: English
- Campus size: 2.2 acre
- Campus type: Urban
- Colors: Off white and Dark Green

Greenfingers Global School, often abbreviated as GFGS is a CBSE affiliated School located in Kharghar, Navi Mumbai. Green Fingers Global School was established in 2006. The school started its first session in the year 2006–2007. GFGS was founded by Late Shri Shankarrao Mohite Patil.

== History ==
=== Location ===
GFGS is located in sector 12, Kharghar, Navi Mumbai. School campus measures 2.2 acre land with playground, digiboards, labs, archery etc. It is the second in the chain of schools founded by Late Shri Shankarrao Mohite Patil. It is a co-educational English medium school providing schooling from Nursery to class XII.

=== Foundation ===
Greenfingers was founded in Akluj, a city in Solapur district by late Shri Shankarrao Mohite Patil, also known as father of cooperative movement in Maharashtra. School is run by Shiv Parvati Trust, managed by Vijaysingh Mohite Patil who was also Minister for Rural development and Tourism. The school has been named Greenfingers as a tribute to the founder and the farming community.

=== Inauguration ===
Inaugural event of the school was attended by then Chief Minister of Maharashtra Vilasrao Deshmukh on 15 June 2006. The inaugural event was also attended by Deputy Chief Minister of Maharashtra R. R. Patil and Vijaysingh Mohite Patil. The event included a ribbon cutting ceremony and a short speech by Deshmukh. Several top officials from Navi Mumbai and Mumbai were also present. GFGS was established in 2006, starting its first session in the year 2006–2007.

== Infrastructure ==
The school includes labs, computer labs, library, playgrounds, indoor games for students, etc. The school also has a horse riding area in its campus along with yoga and meditation room, music room, arts and crafts room. Seminar halls and an auditorium also form part of the Campus.

Greenfingers Global School is among the few schools, to install the Radio Frequency Identification Technology (RFID) in the institute's premises. RFID tagged ID cards is provided to students which will record their attendance as it crosses the strategically placed RFID reader and antenna. Parents receive regular updates about their child's activities inside the school premises via SMS.

== Activities ==
In the year 2010, Greenfingers Global School included Archery in its curriculum to create awareness about the sports and also giving students chance to pursue the same as a career, making it the first school in the city to do so. School hosted the 5th National Kung-Fu Championship at its premises, for the first time in the city on 15 January 2011. GFGS also hosted the VIII Inter State Archery Competition in which 18 teams from all over Maharashtra participated.
