= Services Preparatory Institute =

- सैनिकी सेवापूर्व शिक्षण संस्था
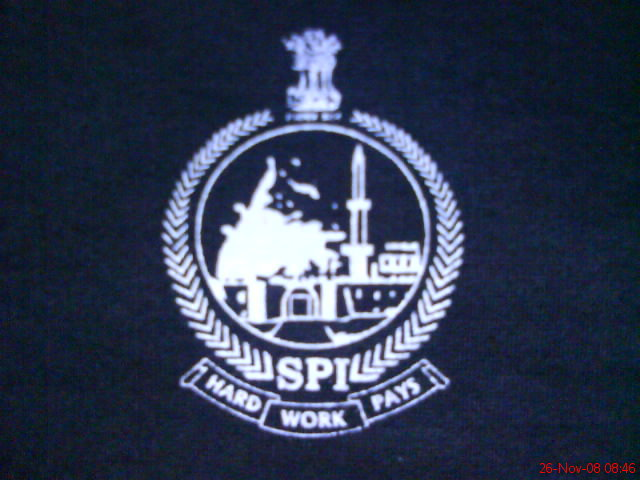
- Logo of Services Preparatory Institute

Location
- Sector N-12, CIDCO; Chhatrapati Sambhajinagar, Maharashtra, 431003; India; 19.9065°N 75.3495°E

Information
- Type: Public military school
- Motto: दृढ़ प्रयत्नेन सिद्ध्यते (Hard Work Pays)
- Established: 1977
- Director: Col. Makarand Deshmukh
- Grades: XI–XII
- Gender: Boys
- Enrollment: 60
- Campus size: 10 acres (4.0 ha)
- Colours: Blue and grey
- Website: www.spiaurangabad.com girlspinashik.co.in

Services Preparatory Institute (SPI) (Marathi: सैनिकी सेवापूर्व शिक्षण संस्था) is a state-run institution in Chhatrapati Sambhajinagar, Maharashtra that prepares youth for the officer cadre of the Indian Armed Forces. The institute has consistently performed well in the National Defence Academy (NDA) and Indian Naval Academy (INA) entrance examinations.

== History ==
After the establishment of the NDA at Khadakwasla, Pune in 1954, it was observed that although the academy was located in Maharashtra, few candidates from the state were being admitted. The Government of Maharashtra therefore formed a committee under the chairmanship of Lt. Gen. S. P. P. Thorat (Retd.), Kirti Chakra, Padma Shri, DSO, to study the issue and recommend solutions. Based on the committee's recommendations, the Services Preparatory Institute (SPI) was established in Chhatrapati Sambhajinagar in 1977 to prepare boys academically, mentally, and physically for entry into the NDA and other defence academies.

== Objectives and Training ==
SPI serves as a feeder institution for the NDA, the 10+2 Technical Entry Scheme (B.Tech.), and the INA (B.Tech.). The institute emphasizes comprehensive education and personality development. It provides coaching for the Union Public Service Commission (UPSC) NDA written examination, and its training curriculum also prepares students for SSB interviews.

== Achievements ==
=== Services Preparatory Institute ===
In 2017, SPI received 9,017 applications for 60 seats. In 2019, 13 cadets were selected to the NDA and INA. In 2020, there were over 13,000 applicants for 60 seats, and 22 cadets were selected to the Indian Armed Forces. In 2021, SPI received 5,779 applications, and 11 cadets were selected to the NDA and INA. In 2023, 44 cadets cleared the UPSC–NDA examination. A total of 22 students were selected for the 156th NDA batch from SPI and GSPI.

=== Girls Services Preparatory Institute ===
From 2023, a separate SPI for girls, known as the Girls Services Preparatory Institute (GSPI), was established in Nashik by the Government of Maharashtra. Three girls from the first course cleared the UPSC–NDA written exam, and in 2025, two girl cadets from the SPI made it to the NDA.

== Directors ==
Col LW Araj	1977-1980
Maj GB Ahire (Officiating)	1980-1983
Capt ST Jadhav (Officiating)	1983-1984
Col JD Katkar	1984-1992
Lt Col NV Darkunde (Officiating)	1992-1992
Brig SV Deodhar	1992-1996
Capt ST Jadhav (Officiating)	1996-1996
Lt Col AR Katkar (Officiating)	1996-1998
Gp Capt VK Saxena	1998-1999
Maj VV Patwari (Officiating)	1999-1999
Capt R Mahajan (Officiating)	1999-1999
Maj VV Patwari (Officiating)	2000-2000
Col DH Parab	2000-2005
Capt PD Mathe (Officiating)	2005-2006
Lt Col SB Raut (Officiating)	2006-2008
Gp Capt SM Kulkarni	2008-2009
Lt Col SD Naik (Officiating)	2010-2010
Maj CV Kulthe (Officiating)	2010-2014
Lt Col US Pol	2014-2018
PL Sormare (Officiating)	2018-2019
Bhanudas Palve (Officiating)	2019-2019
Col AR Dalvi	2019-2022
Maj Syeda Firasat (Officiating)	2022-2025
Col MK Deshmukh	2025-

Since 9 October 2025, Col. Makarand Deshmukh (Retd) serves as the Director of SPI.
