= Lighthouse Learning =

Indian private educational group

- Formerly: EuroKids International
- Type: Private
- Industry: Education
- Founded: 2001; 25 years ago in Mumbai, India
- Founder: Prajodh Rajan; Vikas Phadnis
- Headquarters: Mumbai, India
- Area served: India, Nepal, Bangladesh and the Middle East
- Brands: EuroKids Preschools; Kangaroo Kids International Preschools; Billabong High International Schools; EuroSchool International; Centre Point Schools Nagpur; Mother's Pet Kindergarten; Heritage Xperiential Learning Schools; Phoenix Greens School of Learning; Finland International School Maldives
- Revenue: ▲₹450 crore (2019)
- Owner: KKR (90%)
- Website: Official website

Lighthouse Learning (formerly known as EuroKids International Group) is a group of private educational institutions in India which runs a chain of schools and pre-schools with EuroKids, Kangaroo Kids, EuroSchool, Billabong High International School, Centre Point Group of Schools and Phoenix Greens School of Learning. It runs 1,850 pre-schools and 60 K-12 schools in India, Maldives, Nepal, Bangladesh and the Middle East. It was founded in 2001. A variety of private equity firms including KKR, Partners Group have had or have stake in the company.

== History ==
The company was founded as EuroKids International in 2001 by Prajodh Rajan and Vikas Phadnis. It entered the K12 segment with a series of EuroSchools in 2009. In 2013, its 50% stake was acquired by Gaja Capital along with its Swiss investor Partners Group, later increasing their shareholding in the company to 75% as the company acquired Kangaroo Kids and Billabong International High Schools franchises in 2017 to expand its business. In November 2019, its 90% stake was acquired by US-based Private equity firm KKR for ₹1,475 crore (US$153 million), making it one of the largest foreign investments in India's educational sector. The company was renamed Lighthouse Learning from EuroKids Group in 2021.

The company has appointed Ibibo founder Ashish Kashyap, educationist Indu Shahani and Retailers Association of India chairman Bijou Kurien to its board in 2021. In May 2021, it acquired Nagpur-based Centre Point Group of Schools (CPS). However, the company did not disclose the extent of dilution in holdings of the CPS Group. In September 2021, the company launched its first edition of Educator's Impact Awards on Teacher's Day.

== Operations ==
The company owns and operates preschool brands like EuroKids Preschool, Kangaroo Kids Pre-schools, Mother's Pet and K12 schools - EuroSchool International, Billabong High International School, Centre Point School in Nagpur serving more than 1,50,000 students Kangaroo Kids has a network of 110 pre-schools, while Billabong High International School has a network of 35 schools, as of 2020. Billabong High International Schools, which offers the Indian Certificate of Secondary Education (ICSE), International General Certificate of Secondary Education (IGCSE) and Central Board of Secondary Education (CBSE) boards, from pre-school through Grade 12, has its presence in Qatar, Dubai, Maldives and Saudi Arabia. The group operates and manages its own pre-schools and schools and also operates through the franchise model across India.

== Financials ==
The group reported revenue of ₹350 crore in FY2018 and in FY2019, its revenue was ₹450 crore. It has been growing around 22% per year.

== Awards and recognition ==
- In January 2020, the company was awarded the Best Online Children's Learning Award at the Education Innovation Awards under a pre-school category by Entrepreneur India and Franchise India.
- It was named the Most Trusted Brand in the education category as per the TRA's Brand Trust Report 2020.
- It was named Education Company of the Year by the VCCircle in 2020.
- It won the Leading Preschool Chain (National)' and 'Innovation in Curriculum in Early Childhood Development' Award at World Education Award 2019.
- The company was awarded as the 'Best Education Brand of 2018: Pre-School & Nursery Category' by The Economic Times. The award was bestowed by Maharshtra's Minister of Education, Vinod Tawde.
- The company was awarded the 'Pre-School Franchisor of The Year' in the Business World Education's 'Top Education Brands In India' list 2017.
- In 2016, it won the Indian Education Awards 2016 under the category Innovation in Early Learning at the Indian Education Congress Awards 2016.
- EuroKids, founded in 2001, celebrated 25 years of its early childhood education journey, marking a significant milestone in shaping preschool learning in India.
