= Shankarrao Butte Patil Vidyalaya, Junnar =

Coordinates: 19.2°N 73.88°E

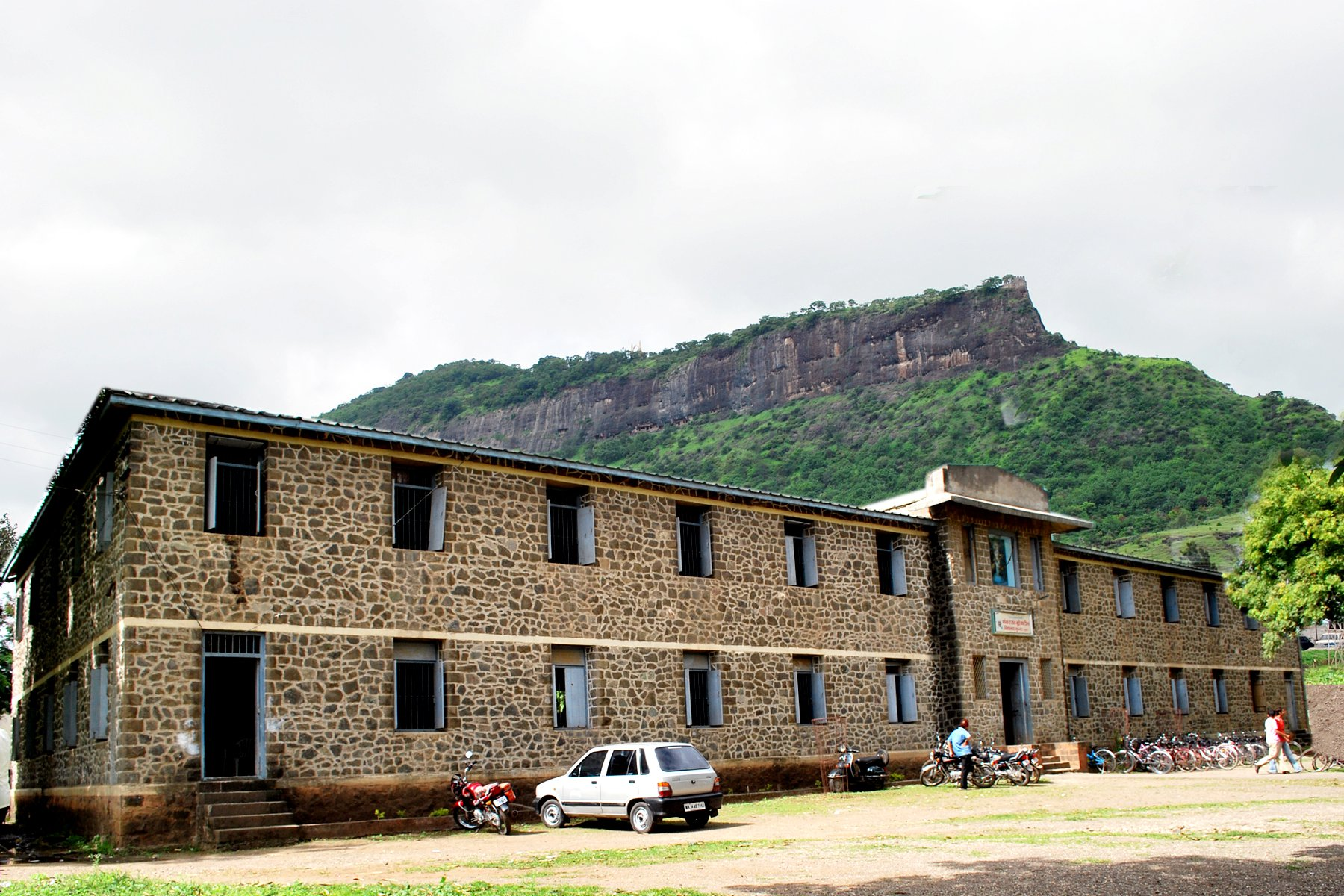
- Shankarrao Butte Patil Vidyalaya main building

Location
- Shankarrao Butte Patil Vidyalaya, Rao-Saheb Butte Patil Marg, Kalyan Peth, Junnar; Junnar, Maharashtra; India

Information
- Former names: New English School
- Type: Public co-ed
- Motto: Play the Game(Practise Virtue)
- Established: 1935
- Chairperson: Junnar Education Society
- Language: Marathi, English
- Sports: Kabaddi, Kho-Kho, Athletics games

Shankarrao Butte Patil Vidyalaya, formerly New English School, Junnar is one of the oldest and reputed school in the western Maharashtra, in the town of Junnar in Pune district. It was established in 1935 by the Junnar Education Society under the intellectual and academic leadership of the famous educator R.P.Sabnis, a Cambridge University alumni. The institute has the motto "Play the game" and धर्मं चर (Practise the Virtue) from Taittiriya Upanishad.

The institute is built on 18 acres (7.3 ha) of land donated by Rao-Saheb Ramchandra Anaji Butte Patil in memory of his son, Shankarrao Butte Patil. Shankarrao Butte Patil Vidyalaya has secondary, higher secondary and English medium school running under its umbrella.
