= List of colleges in Mumbai =

This is a list of notable colleges in Mumbai, India. Many of the colleges are autonomous universities, while others are affiliated with the University of Mumbai. Colleges are spread throughout the city as well as the suburbs. Popular courses include B.A., B.Sc., and B.Com. Many colleges also offer professional courses, which concentrate on a specialized field. Almost all colleges offer courses at junior college level, which is equivalent to the last two years of high schools in other countries.

The junior colleges are governed by the Maharashtra State Board for Secondary and Higher Secondary Education.

== Arts, science and commerce ==
- Chetana College, Bandra
- C. H. M. College, Ulhasnagar
- D. G. Ruparel College of Arts, Science and Commerce, Matunga
- Elphinstone College, Kala Ghoda, Fort
- Guru Nanak Khalsa College of Arts, Science & Commerce, Matunga
- H.R. College of Commerce and Economics, Churchgate
- Jai Hind College, Churchgate
- K. P. B. Hinduja College of Commerce, Charni Road
- Kishinchand Chellaram College, Churchgate
- M. M. K. College, Bandra
- Kirti M. Doongursee College, Dadar
- Malini Kishor Sanghvi College of Commerce & Economics, Vile Parle
- Mithibai College, Vile Parle
- Mulund College of Commerce, Mulund
- Narsee Monjee College of Commerce and Economics, Vile Parle
- NES Ratnam College Of Arts, Science & Commerce, Bhandup
- R. D. National College, Bandra
- Ramnarain Ruia College, Matunga
- Ramniranjan Anandilal Podar College of Commerce and Economics, Matunga
- Ramniranjan Jhunjhunwala College of Arts, Science & Commerce
- Royal College of Science, Arts and Commerce, Mira Road
- Siddharth College of Arts, Science and Commerce, Fort
- SIES College of Arts, Science & Commerce, Sion
- South Indians' Welfare Society College, Wadala
- SPDT Lions Juhu College of Arts, Commerce and Science, Mumbai, Andheri
- St. Xavier's College, Dhobitalao, Fort
- Sydenham College of Commerce and Economics, Churchgate
- Vani Vidyalaya High School and Junior College, Mulund
- Wilson College, Girgaon
- Universal AI University, Karjat

== Medical ==
- Grant Medical College and Sir JJ Group of Hospitals
- Hinduhridaysamrat Balasaheb Thackeray Medical College and Dr. R. N. Cooper Municipal General Hospital
- K. J. Somaiya Medical College & Research Centre
- Seth G.S. Medical College and King Edward Memorial Hospital
- Lokmanya Tilak Municipal Medical College and General Hospital
- Topiwala National Medical College and BYL Nair Charitable Hospital

== Engineering ==
- A. P. Shah Institute of Technology - Thane
- Datta Meghe College of Engineering, Airoli
- Fr. Conceicao Rodrigues Institute of Technology, Vashi
- Institute of Chemical Technology, Matunga (Autonomous)
- Indian Institute of Technology Bombay, Powai
- K. J. Somaiya College of Engineering, Vidyavihar
- K.J. Somaiya Institute of Technology, Sion (Autonomous)
- Konkan Gyanpeeth College of Engineering, Karjat
- Lokmanya Tilak College of Engineering, Koparkhairane
- M. H. Saboo Siddik College of Engineering - Byculla
- Mahatma Gandhi Mission's College of Engineering and Technology, Kamothe
- SVKM's NMIMS
- Padmabhushan Vasantdada Patil Pratishthan's College of Engineering, Sion
- Pillai College of Engineering (Autonomous), Panvel
- Rajiv Gandhi Institute of Technology, Mumbai
- Ramrao Adik Institute of Technology, Nerul
- Rizvi College of Engineering, Bandra (West)
- Rustomjee Academy for Global Careers, Thane
- Sardar Patel College of Engineering - Andheri
- Sardar Patel Institute of Technology - Andheri
- Shah and Anchor Kutchhi Engineering College, Chembur
- Shivajirao S Jondhale College of Engineering, Dombivli
- SIES Graduate School of Technology, Nerul
- St. Francis Institute of Technology, Borivali
- Thadomal Shahani Engineering College Mumbai, Bandra
- Vidyalankar Institute of Technology, Wadala
- Universal AI University, Karjat
- Usha Mittal Institute of Technology, Santacruz
- Veermata Jijabai Technological Institute, Matunga (Autonomous)
- Vivekanand Education Society's Institute of Technology, Chembur
- Xavier Institute of Engineering Mahim

== Hotel management ==
- IHM Mumbai, Dadar west
- Rustomjee Academy for Global Careers, Dahanu

== Law ==
- G. J. Advani Law College, Bandra
- Government Law College, Churchgate
- K C Law College, Churchgate
- Maharashtra National Law University, Mumbai
- School of Law, University of Mumbai, Mumbai
- Siddharth College of Law, Anand Bhavan, Fort

== Management ==
- Alkesh Dinesh Mody Institute, Santacruz
- Dr. V. N. Bedekar Institute of Management Studies, Thane West
- Indian Institute of Management Mumbai, Powai
- Jamnalal Bajaj Institute of Management Studies, Churchgate
- K. J. Somaiya Institute of Management Studies and Research, Vidyavihar
- N. L. Dalmia Institute of Management Studies and Research, Mira Road East
- Narsee Monjee Institute of Management Studies, Vile Parle West
- SIES College of Management Studies, Nerul
- S. P. Jain Institute of Management and Research, Andheri West
- Shailesh J. Mehta School of Management, IIT Bombay, Powai
- Sydenham Institute of Management Studies, Research and Entrepreneurship Education, Churchgate
- Tata Institute of Social Sciences, Deonar
- Universal AI University, Karjat
- University of Mumbai, Thane Sub Campus, Thane
- WE School, Matunga Central

== Pharmacy ==
- Institute of Chemical Technology, Matunga (Autonomous)

== Vocational institutes ==
- JD Institute of Fashion Technology
- Rustomjee Academy for Global Careers, Thane
