= Siddharth College =

Siddharth College may refer to:

- Siddharth College of Arts, Science and Commerce, in Mumbai, India
- Siddharth College of Law, Mumbai, in Mumbai
- Siddharth College of Commerce and Economics, a college in Mumbai
