= Fr. Conceicao Rodrigues Memorial Debate =

Annual debate competition in Mumbai

The National level Fr. Conceicao Rodrigues Memorial Debate is a Debate Competition in Mumbai, hosted annually by Fr. Conceicao Rodrigues College of Engineering, Bandra. Inaugurated in the year 1999 as a debate competition for colleges within Mumbai, it became a National level Competition in 2012. It is a two-day event usually held in the month of September. The debate aims to provide a forum for today’s youth to articulate views and engage in a dialogue on various affairs that affect the life of the common man, directly or otherwise.

== Venue ==
The debates on the first day are carried out in various rooms in the Fr. CRCE campus at Agnel Ashram, Bandstand, Bandra. The final day is held at the state of the art College Hall ‘Samvaad’.

== Format ==
The competition follows a knock-out, non-parliamentary format of debate. The language used in all the debates is English. There are 32 participating colleges from all over Maharashtra, Gujarat, Karnataka and Odisha. Each participating college sends a contingent of 2 students. As of the year 2016, only the topic for the first round (League round 1) is given one week prior to the competition. The topics for the rest of the rounds(League rounds 2, 3 and Quarter-finals) are given 15 minutes prior to the debate. For the semi-finals and finals the topics are give one day in advance.

The debates are judged by invited judges who represent various fields of education, social services, entertainment and industry. It is organized entirely by the Students’ Council of Fr. CRCE and the specially formed Debate Committee.

The knock-outs and the quarter-finals are carried out on the first day of the two-day event. The second day witnesses the 4 teams going through the semi-finals and finals to win the Fr. C. R. Memorial Rolling Trophy and cash prizes. The Best Speaker is also awarded a special prize.

As of the year 2016, the format of the competition was changed to a league system. The 32 participating teams are divided into two pools viz. A and B. Each team then competes for three rounds(League round 1, 2 & 3). The winner of each round is awarded a point. The top eight teams qualify for the quarter-finals. The format for the quarter-final, semi-final and final is knock-out style.

== Rules and regulations ==
- One speaker of the team makes the opening speech while the other makes the closing speech.
- The proposition starts the debate; the proposition gives the opening speech, followed by the opposition's opening speech.
- The opposition raises the first point in the Refutation round.
- The last 30 seconds of the Refutation round is reserved for the concluding statement.
- The debate is concluded by the closing speech, first from the opposition and then the proposition.

== Theme ==
Every year the college announces a theme for the debate. Ranging from national to abstract, the theme is a common link between the myriad topics that the students debate upon in the course of the event. The following are various themes from the previous years:

Year	Theme
2012	India: An Order Rising Amongst Chaos
2013	India: Shifting towards Equinox
2014	Entranced by Light, Entrapped by Shadows
2015	Appeasing mist shrouding the hills of reality
2016	Breaking the Confines of Conformity
2017	Competence of Latent Judgement
2018	Hegemony of Moral Absolution
2019	Ideologies Egocentrism Engendering Self Abatement
2020	Immanent Critique of Social Adiaphora

== Previous Winners ==
The list of the winners of the coveted Rolling Trophy since its inception.

Year	Winner
1999	Fr. Conceicao Rodrigues College of Engineering
2000	Fr. Conceicao Rodrigues College of Engineering
2001	Lokmanya Tilak Medical College
2002	Indian Institute of Technology Bombay
2003	St. Francis Institute of Technology
2004	Lokmanya Tilak Medical College
2005	St. Francis Institute of Technology
2006	Thakur College of Engineering and Technology
2007	Thakur College of Engineering and Technology
2008	Fr. Conceicao Rodrigues College of Engineering
2009	Don Bosco Institute of Technology
2010	Fr. Conceicao Rodrigues College of Engineering
2011	Fr. Conceicao Rodrigues College of Engineering
2012	St. Xavier's College, Mumbai
2013	Narsee Monjee Institute of Management Studies
2014	Pravin Gandhi College of Law
2015	St. Francis Institute of Technology
2016	Don Bosco Institute of Technology
2017	Fr. Conceicao Rodrigues College of Engineering
2018	ILS Law College
2019	Sardar Patel Institute of Technology
2020	National Law School of India University

== Chief Guests ==
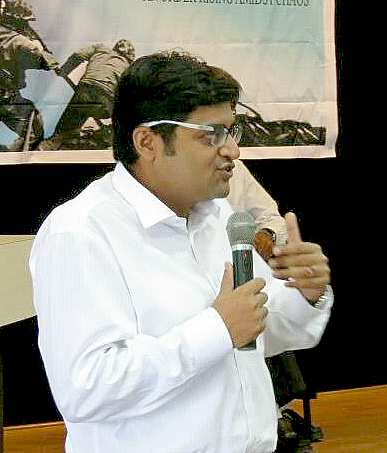
Arnab Goswami as the Chief Guest at Fr. Conceicao Rodrigues Memorial Debate 2012

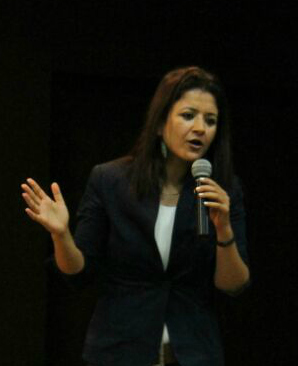
Mahrukh Inayet as the Chief Guest at Fr. Conceicao Rodrigues Memorial Debate 2014

The quality of thoughts and ideas expressed by students over the past debates has been lauded by all the Chief Guests and Guests of Honour who have witnessed the event, some of them being Former MP Priya Dutt, Mrs. Shraddha Jadhav, Mr. Kumar Ketkar, Mr. Madhur Bhandarkar, Mr. Ashoke Pandit, Mr. Mahesh Bhatt, Mr. Prakash Jha, Mr. Sanjay Manjrekar, Mrs Dolly Thakore.

“No wonder films don’t always do well. After seeing a Debate like this where so many intellectual young minds fight it out, who would want to go to a movie theatre” - Mahesh Bhatt, Film Director

“ Way beyond my expectations. Never expected a technical college to hold such a non-technical Debate!” - Dolly Thakore, Theatre Actress

“The debate was well-organised and the participants were well aware.You people reminded me of the smart youth our country is famous for” - Madhur Bhandarkar, Film Director

The Chief Guest for the 2012 edition was Mr. Arnab Goswami, the acclaimed Editor-in-chief of Times Now. Famous Journalist, Mrs. Bachi Karkaria was the Chief Guest on the 15th Fr. C. R. Memorial Debate. In the year 2014, Mahrukh Inayet was the Chief Guest.
