= University of Mumbai, Thane Sub Campus =

University in India

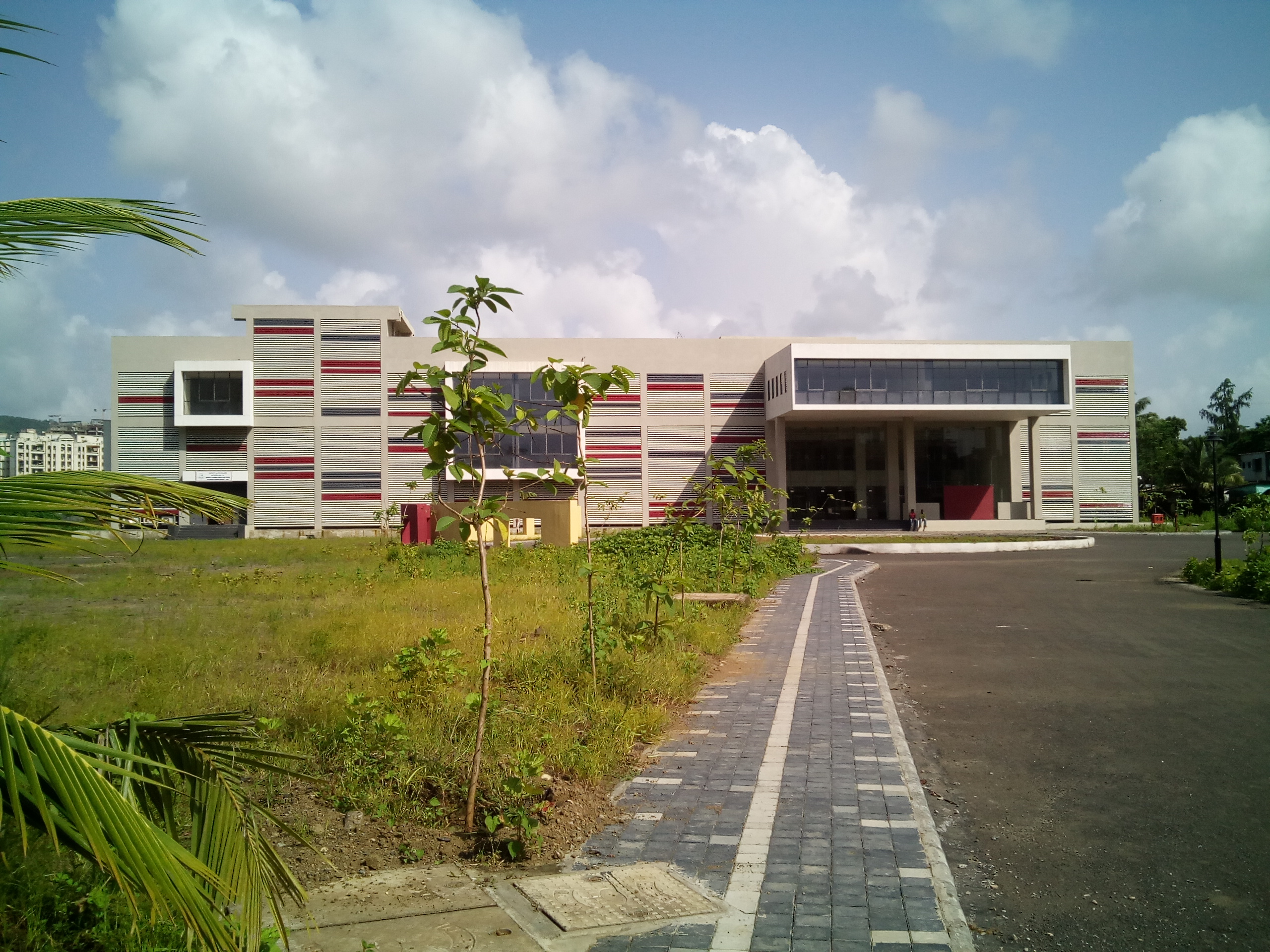
- Front side of the University
- Motto: शील वृत्त फला विद्या
- Motto in English: "The Fruit of Learning is Good Character and Righteous Conduct"
- Type: Public university Sub - Campus
- Established: 2014
- Academic affiliations: BCI; UGC
- Chancellor: Governor of Maharashtra
- Vice-Chancellor: Suhas Pednekar
- Director: Dr. Sunita Magre
- Students: 800 - 900
- Undergraduates: 800 - 900
- Location: University Rd, Behind Runwal Garden City, Balkum Pada, Thane West, Thane, Maharashtra, 400608, India; 19°13′30.9″N 72°59′14.0″E
- Campus: Urban, 7 acres (2.8 ha)
- Language: English
- Website: mu.ac.in/portal/thane-sub-campus
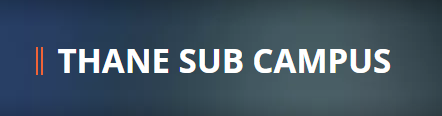

The University of Mumbai (known earlier as University of Bombay) is one of the oldest and premier Universities in India. It was established in 1857 consequent upon "Wood's Education Dispatch", and it is one amongst the first three Universities in India. As a sequel to the change in the name of the city from Bombay to Mumbai, the name of the University has been changed from "University of Bombay" to "University of Mumbai", vide notification issued by the Government of Maharashtra and published in the Government Gazette dated 4 September 1996.

The Thane Sub Campus of the University of Mumbai which was inaugurated by the hands of former Vice Chancellor Dr. Rajan Welukar became operational in the year 2014. University of Mumbai, Thane Sub Campus (MUTC) is sub campus of University of Mumbai which under takes School of Law, University of Mumbai which offers five-year Integrated Programme in Legal Education B.B.A. - LL.B. (Hons.) and School of Management Studies, University of Mumbai which offers five - year Integrated Management Programme BMS-MBA. The Campus also houses Institute of Distance & Open Learning, which is at 2nd floor. It is for various undergraduate and post graduate courses as well as diploma courses.

== Admissions ==
The admission to the undergraduate courses at Thane Sub Campus is based on All India Merit Rank of MH CET(Law) for Integrated Law Programme and Mumbai University Common Management Entrance Test (MUCMET) for Integrated Management Programme.

== Infrastructure ==
The College was built on a budget of 3 crore Rupees.

== Gallery ==
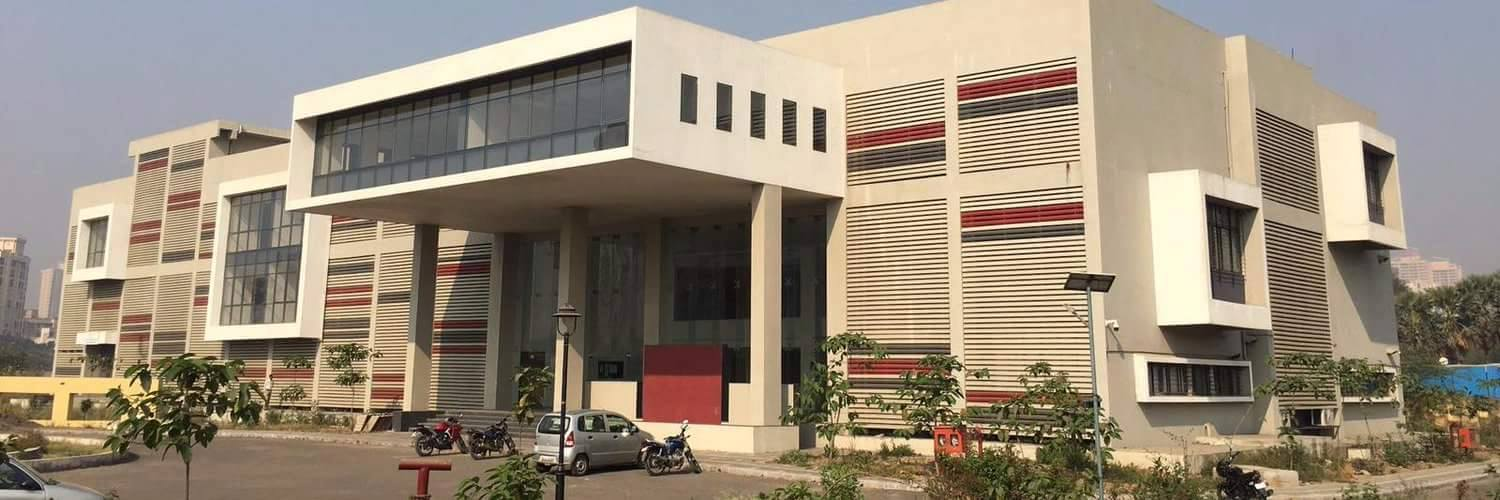
University Building

== See also ==
- Legal education in India
- List of law schools in India
- List of colleges in Mumbai
- University of Mumbai
