= School of Law, University of Mumbai =

Law school in Mumbai, India

Coordinates: 19°13′30.5″N 72°59′12.9″E

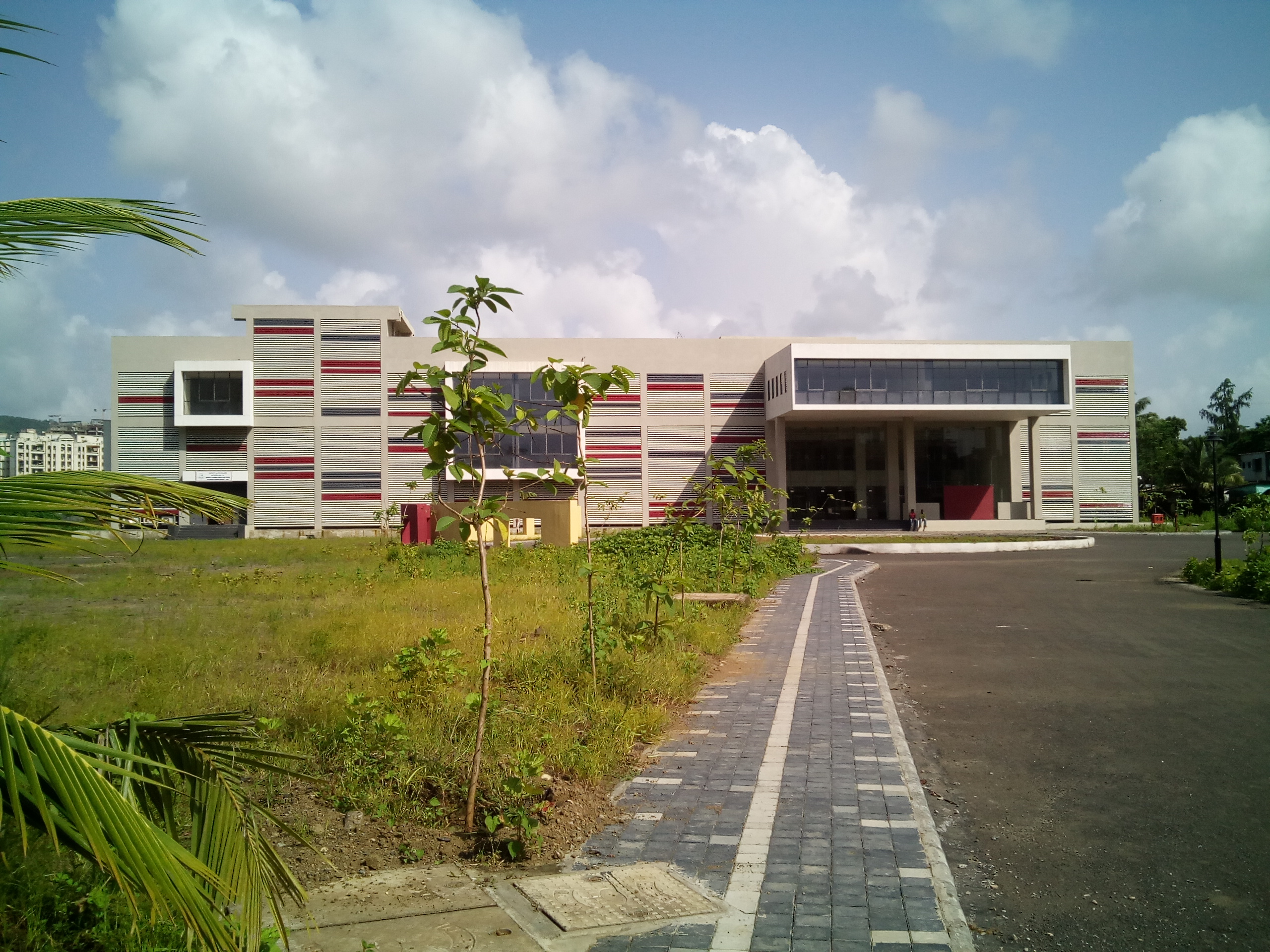
- Front Facade, School of Law
- Motto in English: "The Fruit of Learning is Good Character and Righteous Conduct"
- Type: Public Law school
- Established: 2014
- Affiliations: BCI; UGC
- Chancellor: C. Vidyasagar Rao
- Vice-Chancellor: Dr. Devanand Shinde
- Students: 480
- Undergraduates: 480
- Location: (India) Mumbai, Maharashtra, India
- Campus: Urban, 6 Acres
- Colours: White and Black
- Website: University of Mumbai
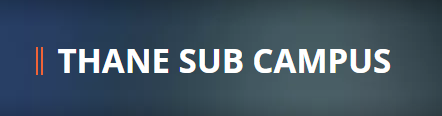

The School of Law, University of Mumbai is a public institution for undergraduate legal education in India. It is established under Department of Law, University of Mumbai and is situated at the University of Mumbai, Thane Sub Campus, Thane, Mumbai. The college is one of the two law colleges in Mumbai University to offer B.B.A. - LL.B. Course, the other being University of Mumbai Law Academy. School of Law is a University administered Institution. The Campus also houses Institute of Distance & Open Learning and Management courses.

== Admissions ==
Admissions to undergraduate courses happen through the Maharashtra Law CET. Maharashtra. It is conducted every year for the admission in undergraduate Legal Courses by Maharashtra Government.

== Infrastructure ==
The College was built on a budget of 3 crore Rupees. The building is situated at the newly built sprawling 6.5 acre University of Mumbai Campus in Thane,

It has the following amenities:

- Library
- Computer Lab
- Moot Court Hall
- Legal Aid Clinic
- In-house Canteen
- Reading Room
- Common Rooms
- Auditorium

== Academics ==
=== Undergraduate ===
School of Law offers a five-year integrated B.B.A.-LL.B.(Hons.) Program. It offers 60 seats each year. SoL follows a semester system with End Semester Exams happening every December and May. 75% Attendance is strictly mandatory and Bar Council dress code is followed by students.

==== Extracurriculars ====
Students are regularly provided with guest lectures on current issues and are taken for court visits and seminars.

== Moot Court & Debate Competitions ==
The Students of School of Law have participated in many Moot Court Competitions and have its own Moot Court Association SoL conducts intra as well as freshre's moot court every year.

Students have achieved and participated in:

- IM Nanavati Memorial Moot Court competition -2018
- BCI National Moot Court
- KES Law College Case Probe Competition - 2017
- 10th National Moot Court Competition, K.C. Law College, Chuchgate
- Investigative Court Room Trial, D.Y. Patil Law College, Navi Mumbai
- Intra-College Moot Court Competition, Fort Campus, Fort
- Gnaritus - Model United Nations(MUN)
- Intra-Collegiate Debate Competitions
- GLC MUN - 2017

== Legal Aid Clinic ==
The Legal Aid Clinic (or committee, as is the practice now), established under Legal Service Authorities Act, 1987 which reads as "Develop, in consultation with the Bar Council of India, programs for clinical legal education and promote guidance and supervise the establishment and working of legal services clinics in universities, law colleges and other institutions". The Legal Aid Clinic at School of Law, University of Mumbai aims to provide every citizen with legal help, summary advice, self-help, community legal education, community development and various legal awareness program which is to be run Professors and students of School of Law, University of Mumbai.

== Fest ==
School of Law undertakes annual fest every fall that has many competitions and games and celebrations. The University of Mumbai, Thane Sub Campus organises its own cultural festival as well as annual utsav "Khwaish". It consists of youth oriented events and is organised and managed by the students. It has participation from several colleges and encourages students to showcase their talent on a bigger platform. There are more than thirty events, cultural and academic.

- Khwaish 2017

Slogan - "DREAM"-In the City of Dreams, make a wish and be a part of Khwaइश‘17!

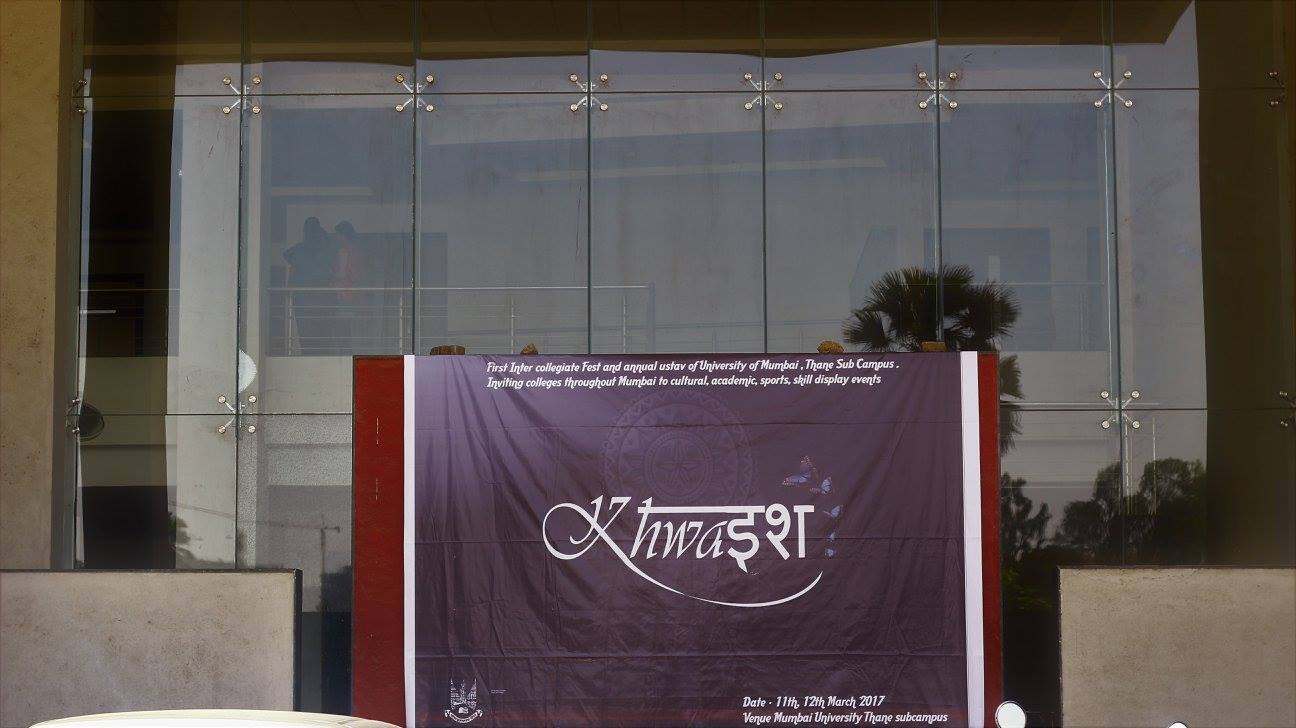
Khwaish Fest MUTC Banner

== Culture ==
The College celebrates all the festivals throughout the year and has annual Week of Celebrations in Winter.

== See also ==
- Legal education in India
- List of law schools in India
- List of colleges in Mumbai
- University of Mumbai

== Gallery ==
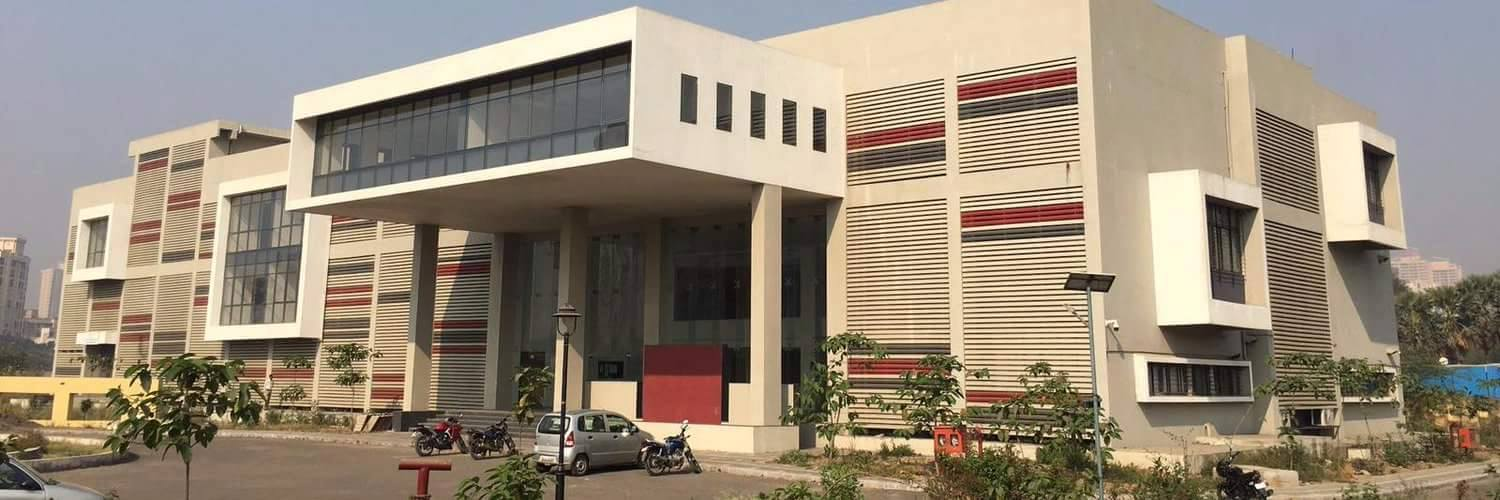
College Building
