= Jhunjhunwala =

Jhunjhunwala is an Indian toponymic Marwari surname from Jhunjhunu in Rajasthan, India. They belong to Marwari community hailing from Rajasthan. Notable people with the surname include:

- Abhishek Jhunjhunwala (born 1982), Indian cricketer
- Ashok Jhunjhunwala (born 1953), Indian electrical engineer
- Banarsi Prasad Jhunjhunwala (1888–1966), Indian politician
- Rakesh Jhunjhunwala (1960–2022), Indian investor and trader, founder of Akasa Air

== See also ==
- Ramniranjan Jhunjhunwala College of Arts, Science & Commerce in Mumbai, India
- Jhunjhunu
