= Amit Bhardwaj =

Indian businessman and convicted fraudster (1983–2022)

- Born: Amit K. Bhardwaj; 17 January 1983; India
- Died: 15 January 2022 (aged 38)
- Education: Mahatma Gandhi Mission's College of Engineering and Technology
- Occupations: Bitcoin miner, entrepreneur
- Known for: GB Miners; Amaze Mining and Blockchain Research Limited

Amit K. Bhardwaj (17 January 1983 – 15 January 2022) was an Indian businessman who founded Amaze Mining and Blockchain Research Limited which ran GB (Gainbitcoin) Miners among other bitcoin-related businesses and projects which have been described as various types of Ponzi schemes.

In April 2018, Gainbitcoin was found to be one of the biggest bitcoin scams. The cyber cell of Pune Police arrested Bhardwaj and his brothers along with co-founders of GB Miners, Nikunj Jain and Sahil Baghla, for running a US$300 million cryptocurrency Ponzi scheme. Bhardwaj was indicted for running a pyramid scheme in relation to the MCAP token taken out by Gainbitcoin and was put before a special court on 5 April 2018.

So far, more than eight people have been arrested and all of them were associated with Gainbitcoin and CEO Bhardwaj.

== Early life and education ==
Bhardwaj was born in India on 17 January 1983. He attended Kendriya Vidyalaya (1998–2000). He later graduated from Mahatma Gandhi Mission's College of Engineering and Technology, Nanded, Maharashtra (2000–2004) with a B. Tech in computer science and engineering.

== Career ==
In 2016, Amit founded Amaze Mining and Blockchain Research Limited, an altcoin mining technology firm. He founded GB Miners, an Indian bitcoin mining pool in 2016, which was later revealed to be a Ponzi scheme.

=== Gainbitcoin and GBMiners ===
In a series of interviews Bhardwaj gave to The Caravan in 2017, he first claimed to not have any part in Gainbitcoin and that he knew of it only as a cloud-mining company, but later argued that he hid his involvement as a "PR strategy". He also misrepresented his total investment in Gainbitcoin and admitted to inflating the figure on the company's website. Bhardwaj also denied any links between Gainbitcoin and GBMiners, though many of the former's investors believed the latter to be the minepool.

== Personal life and death ==
Bhardwaj suffered from several kidney ailments toward the end of his life. He died after suffering a cardiac arrest on 15 January 2022, at the age of 38.

== See also ==
- Bitconnect, India-based bitcoin Ponzi scheme
- Cryptocurrency and crime
