= Konkan Gyanpeeth College of Engineering =

Private engineering college in Karjat, Maharashtra, India

- Type: Private
- Established: 1994
- Affiliations: University of Mumbai
- Principal: Dr. Ronit Vardhave
- Undergraduates: 1,700 approx.
- Location: Karjat, Maharashtra, India; 18.916457°N 73.343114°E
- Campus: 31 acres approx.
- Acronym: KGCE
- Website: www.kgce.edu.in

Konkan Gyanpeeth College of Engineering (KGCE) is a private engineering college located in Karjat, Maharashtra, India. The college is affiliated to the University of Mumbai and approved by the Directorate of Technical Education (DTE), Maharashtra State and All India Council of Technical Education (AICTE), New Delhi.

== History ==
The college was established in 1994, by Prabhakar Narayan (Appasaheb) Dharkar, Ex-Minister of Maharashtra Government. The College was initially started with Computer Engineering, Electronics & Telecommunication Engineering and Instrumentation Engineering, later consolidated by adding branches, namely Mechanical Engineering (1996), Production Engineering (1999) and Information Technology (2001). The college is still consolidating in with an added intake of 60 in Mechanical Engineering branch from academic year 2010.

== Academics ==
KGCE offers undergraduate courses of study in engineering. The four year undergraduate programme leads to the degree of Bachelor of Engineering (BE). The institute has 6 academic departments. The courses offered are:

- Mechanical Engineering
- Electronics & Telecommunication Engineering
- Computer Engineering
- Production Engineering
- Instrumentation Engineering
- Information Technology

Two academic departments have supporting roles and conduct foundation courses for various degree programs, but do not offer any programs of their own. These are:

- Mathematics Department
- Science & Humanities Department

== Campus ==
Seminar Hall

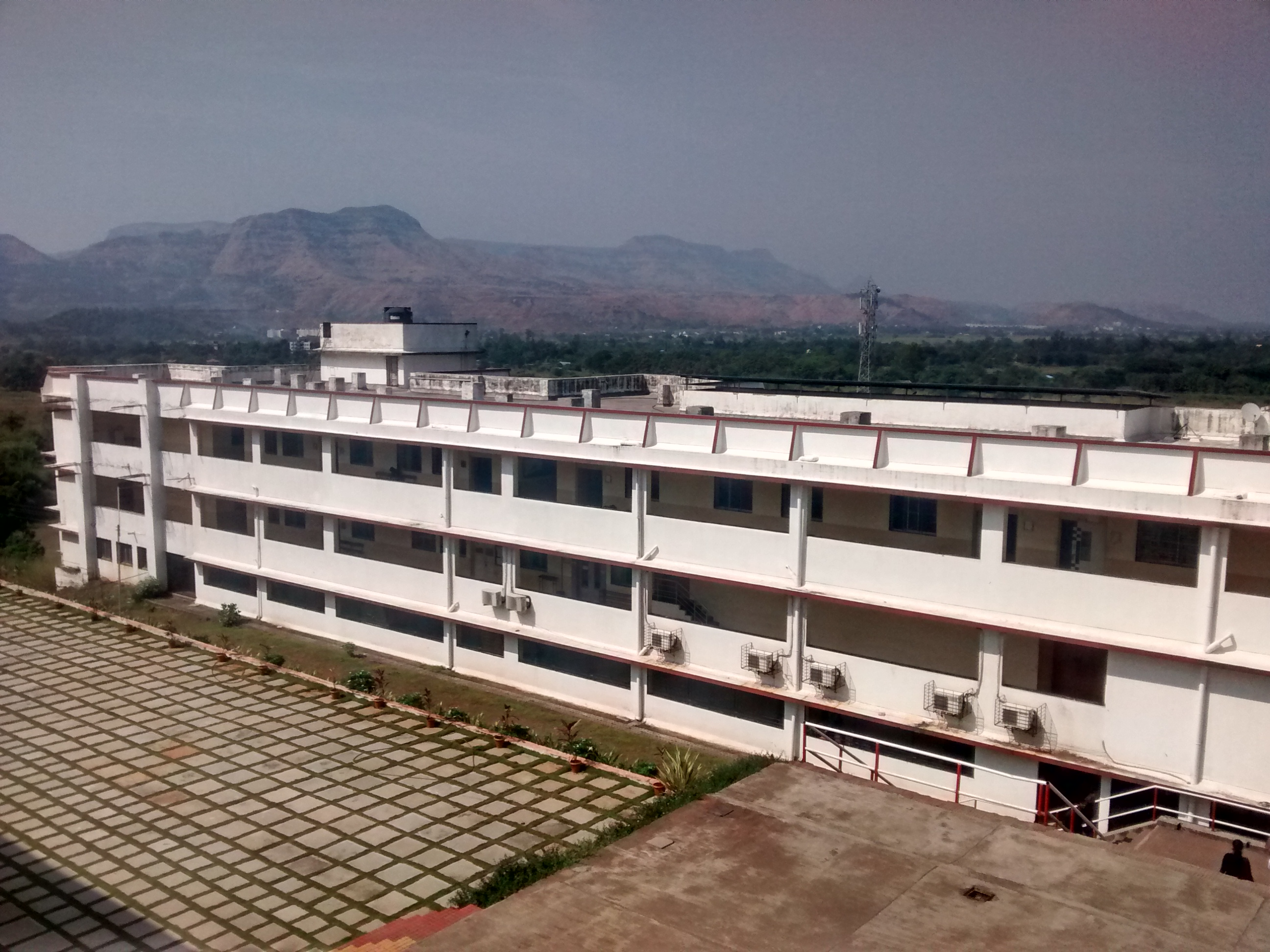
KGCE Building, Karjat.

The campus is spread over an area of over 31 acres includes a main building which has 18 classrooms, 3 drawing halls, 2 tutorial rooms, one library consisting of over 32,000 books and around 55 different periodicals – both international as well as domestic, Digital Library, NPTEL Video Lectures Hall, Reference Section, a cyber-cafe which has 70 computer terminals and 2 servers, along with Broadband Internet Connectivity for use of staff and college students. Well equipped laboratories for each and every departments and also workshops to enable the students to supplement their practicals.

The college has Separate Hostel for Girls and Boys. Boys Hostel is of 60 students capacity and Girls Hostel is of 40 students capacity. Along with facilities like basket-ball court, a foot-ball ground, a cricket field, a volley-ball court and indoor recreation activities like a badminton court and tennis-tables. Campus also a fully equipped Canteen facility which is for the use of the college staff and students. For transport, buses are provided for the use of the students.

== Admission ==
- Admissions for undergraduate degree courses are based on the Maharashtra Health Science And Technical - Common Entrance Test (MHT-CET) and Joint Entrance Examination (JEE) scores.

== Student organizations ==
- MESA-PESA - Mechanical Engineering Students Association-Production Engineering Students Association
- ITSA - Information Technology Student Association
- CSI - Computer Society Of India
- IEEE - Institute of Electrical and Electronics Engineers
- ISA - International Society Of Automation
- IETE - Institute of Electronics & Telecommunication Engineers (India)

== Annual festivals ==
- An inter-collegiate technical festival called Hyper-kube is held in September/October every year. Registrations for various events open in mid-February. Events include Robotics, Quizzes, Open Software competitions, Stock Market Simulation competitions etc.
- An intra-collegiate cultural festival called Spring-Fiesta is held in February/March every year. Some events like Dance Competitions, Fashion Show, Singing Competitions, etc.
- Every February, an intra-collegiate sports festival is held in the college campus, including both indoor and outdoor sports like Cricket and Football. It also includes intra-collegiate competitions in volleyball, box-cricket, Computer games, carrom, chess etc.

== See also ==
- University of Mumbai
- List of Mumbai Colleges
