= Bhaktivedanta Hospital =

Bhaktivedanta Hospital & Research Institute

Geography
- Location: Mira Road, Thane, Maharashtra, India
- Coordinates: 19.2700058°N 72.8704648°E

Services
- Emergency department: Yes

History
- Founded: 1998

Links
- Website: Official Website
- Lists: Hospitals in India

Bhaktivedanta Hospital & Research Institute, instituted in 1998, is a hospital in District Thane, India. It is located at Mira Road in Mumbai and caters to patients in the western suburbs from Borivali to Virar and beyond.

Bhaktivedanta Hospital is a project of Shri Chaitanya Health and Care Trust. It is established as a tribute to Swami Prabhupada, the founder of ISKCON.

== Origin ==
A group of undergraduate students held medical camps in the slums and villages around Mumbai, Maharashtra, India. In 1986, after completing their specializations in various medical fields, the group gradually evolved into a nursing home and finally the Bhaktivedanta Hospital.

Bhaktivedanta Hospital was opened on 11 January 1998. The hospital also conducts the annual free Barsana Eye and Dental Camps.

== Annual Free Cataracts Surgery Camp ==
Bhaktivedanta Hospital & Research Institute runs an annual free cataract surgery camp, the Barsana Eye Camp, in Barsana, Mathura District. The camp aims to serve the people residing in Barsana and the surrounding 120 villages.
