= Shivajirao S Jondhale College of Engineering =

Shivajirao S. Jondhale College of Engineering, Dombivli (East)

Location
- Dombivli, Maharashtra; India; 19.204736°N 73.107997°E

Information
- Type: Private
- Established: 1994-1995
- Grades: First Year to Final Year Engineering
- Affiliation: University of Mumbai
- Acronym: SSJCOE
- Website: shivajiraojondhalecoe.org.in

Shivajirao S. Jondhale College of Engineering (SSJCOE), is an engineering college located in Dombivli in Thane. SSJCOE is a private engineering college founded in 1994-95. The college has six departments: Computer engineering, Information technology, Chemical engineering, Electronics and Telecommunications Engineering, Mechanical engineering and Artificial Intelligence and Machine Learning.

== College management ==
President : Dr Shivajirao S Jondhale
Principal : Dr. Uttara Gogate
Registrar : Shri.Shejul F. C.

Intake of Students

Computer Engineering	90
I.T Engineering	40
Electronics and Telecommunication Engineering	60
Mechanical Engineering	60
Chemical Engineering	60
Artificial Intelligence and Machine Learning	30

== Annual festivals ==
=== Odyssey ===
Odyssey is the annual cultural festival of the college held in the even semesters.

=== Colosseum ===
Colosseum is the annual Inter-Collegiate technical festival of the college held before Odyssey.

=== Kridaratna ===
College's annual Intra-college Sports Festival is named as 'Kridaratna'. It is held in the third week of January. Outdoor games like Overarm Cricket, Box Cricket, Football, Volleyball, Kabaddi, Tug of War & Indoor games like Carrom, Chess, Badminton, Table Tennis, Pool & Snooker are held.

== Student representation ==
Darshan Mane - 2015 batch	Elected General Secretary of the Students council for the year 2014-2015. Under his tenure, the council started the 'मराठी वाङमय मंडळ' under which variety of events took place including 'मराठी भाषा दिवस'. The annual cultural and tech programs 'Odyssey' and 'Colosseum' were also successfully managed.
Raunak Ghag - 2015 batch	President ACES (Association of Computer Engineering Students) 2014-2015 Started Computer Department's tech festival called "Algorhythm", also published department's magazine "The Byte" in 2015. Also represented college at University Level cricket tournaments from 2012-2015
1) Kalpesh Ahirrao(President), 2) Aditya Kale(Vice-President), 3) Siddhesh Lokhande(Secretary), 4) Rahul Choudhary(Joint Secretary), 5) Darshan Budiya(Technical Head), 6) Manas Jatkar(IV Head), 7) Sadhana Dhanaji(Women's Representative), 8) Yash Mahadik(Treasurer), 9) Pritam Anekar(Cultural Head), 10) Komal Gajakosh(Joint Cultural Head), 11) Kiran Patil(Magazine Head)	Committee Members of the MESA(Mechanical Engineering Students Association) 2019-2020 The team of MESA conducted the TECH FESTIVAL called "RESILIENCE", various technical and Fun events took place. The team published the yearly department's magazine "TACHYON".

== Least Known Alumni ==
Year	Name	Department	Role	Known for	Ref.
2021	Smit Shetye	Information Technology	Student	Director, producer, composer, cinematographer, actor, writer of Hasya Katta Official (TV Series) & Owner and RJ, VJ of Hasya Katta Official Radio Station & TV Station	
2021	Prashik Gawai	Information Technology	Student	Actor, producer of Hasya Katta Official (TV Series) and RJ, VJ of Hasya Katta Official Radio Station & TV Station	
2014-15	Raunak Ghag		Student	President ACES (Association of Computer Engineering Students) 2014-2015 Started Computer Department's tech festival called "Algorhythm", also published department's magazine "The Byte" in 2015. Also represented college at University Level cricket tournaments from 2012-2015	
2014-15	Darshan Mane		Student	Elected General Secretary of the Students council for the year 2014-2015. Under his tenure, the council started the 'मराठी वाङ्मय मंडळ' under which variety of events took place including 'मराठी भाषा दिवस'. The annual cultural and tech programs 'Odyssey' and 'Colosseum' were also successfully managed.	
2001-2005	Nitin Chavan	Chemical Engineering	Student	Worked for Kuwait Petroleum Corporation HSSE Group year 2017- 2022, ADNOC, ExxonMobil, Zamil also with Engineering Giants like Larsen & Toubro Worley Technip Shaw Group INC, KBR, Inc., Bilfinger etc.	

== See also ==
- University of Mumbai
- List of colleges in Mumbai
