= Royal College of Science, Arts and Commerce =

College in Mumbai, Maharashtra

Royal College
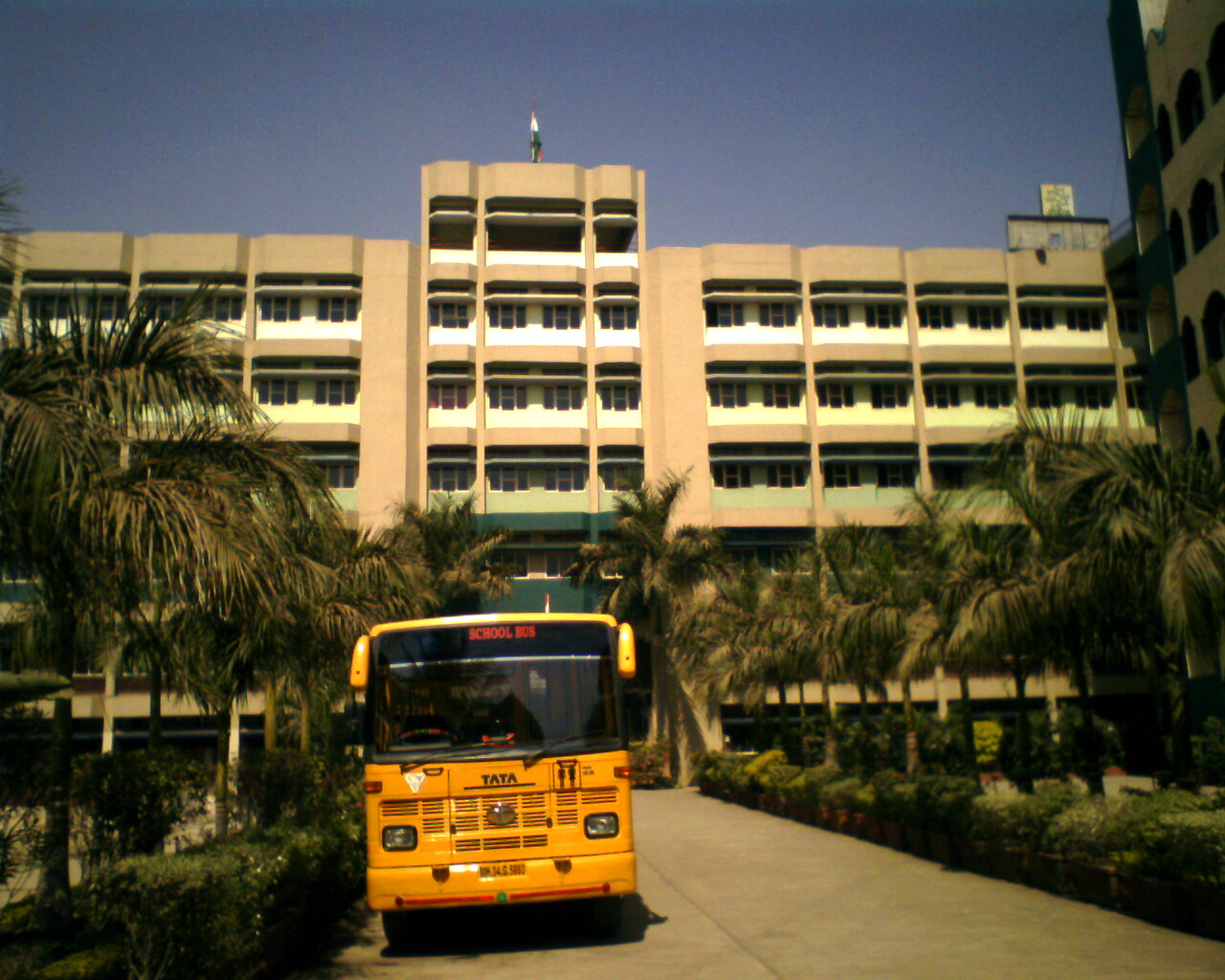
- The Building of Royal College, Mira Road
- Motto: Empowerment through Value Education
- Founder: Prof. Asgar E. Lakdawala
- Academic affiliations: University of Mumbai
- Location: Mumbai, Maharashtra, India; 19.2703°N 72.8712°E
- Website: https://royalcollegemiraroad.edu.in/

Royal College of Arts, Science, Commerce and Management, popularly known as Royal College, is a college located in Mira Road, Mumbai, Maharashtra, and is affiliated with the University of Mumbai. It is one of the prominent higher education institutes in Mira-Bhayandar, alongside other institutions such as Shree L. R. Tiwari College of Engineering. N. L. Dalmia Institute of Management Studies and Research and N. L. Dalmia High School are situated just opposite to it. The college was rated "A with 3.10 CGPA" by the National Assessment and Accreditation Council (NAAC).

Royal College is a part of the Royal Society, which was founded on 28 December 1966 by Prof. Asgar E. Lakdawala. It has a minority quota for Muslim students. The college offers undergraduate courses in Arts, Science, Commerce, and Management Studies. It also offers masters in advanced accountancy (MCom).

== Parwaaz - The Royal Flight - Annual Magazine of the College ==
Parwaaz is the annual college magazine, the efforts towards publication of which mainly come from the English Literary Association. The magazine includes prize-winning articles in English, Hindi, and Urdu languages by students from the competitions that are held within that year.

== Royal Alumni ==
Royal College Alumni Association was established in August 1993. Every year, the Alumni have a reunion on the first Sunday after 26 January in the college premises. Bollywood film director Anurag Basu is probably the most famous alumni of this college.
