= Umrao Hospitals =

Umrao Hospitals (Work Hardt Hospital)
- Asmita Group

Geography
- Location: Mira Road, Mumbai, Maharashtra and thane, India
- Coordinates: 19.284272°N 72.86226°E

Organisation
- Type: Private

Services
- Emergency department: Yes
- Beds: 330

Helipads
- Helipad: No

History
- Founded: 1 November 2010

Links
- Website: http://www.umraohospitals.com

The Umrao Hospitals, Multi-speciality and Tertiary Care hospital is a private hospital located at the Asmita Enclave in the northern Mumbai suburb of Mira Road.

== Location ==
The Umrao Hospitals is located in the eastern part of the Northern Mumbai suburb of Mira Road. It lies in the center of the Asmita Complex, close to the western railway station of Mira Road. It is connected by road to the southern Mumbai as well as to the northern Vasai-Virar region.

== History ==
The Umrao Hospitals was inaugurated on 1 November 2010 by Ghulam Nabi Azad, the Union Minister of Health and Family Welfare, Government of India. and the current General Secretary of the All India Congress Committee, Shri Digvijay Singh, also released a book on the life and achievements of Shri. Sayed Nazar Hussain, who is the chairman of the Umrao Institute of Medical Science and Research Trust, which was established in 1990. During the inauguration, a foundation stone for Umrao college of Nursing Education and Asmita college of Architecture was also laid.

== Infrastructure ==
The hospital recently launched its telemedicine facility. Dr. Sanjay Shah, a consulting radiologist based in U.S.A. made an arrangement with a radiologist from Cleveland Clinic for expert consultation of the cases at the Umrao Hospitals. The hospital is also equipped with Picture Archiving and Communication system) that enables to connect with clinicians across the globe in addition to making the hospital an entirely filmless facility.

A live workshop was also conducted on 3 June 2011, by eminent Cardiac Surgeon Dr. Krishna Prasad when the coronary artery bypass surgery was being performed. On the occasion of Doctor's Day, 1 July 2011, a case studies workshop was held which was accredited by the Maharashtra Medical Council.

The hospital is features technology such as the video cameras that are installed in the intensive care units of the hospital wards. Apart from monitoring, the tiny cameras mounted on top of 100 ICU beds in the 330-bedded hospital. The video cameras, which look like closed-circuit television cameras, have been used as patient monitoring cameras. Hospital authorities say that the cameras are to keep the visitors within the hospital to the minimum, thereby reducing the chances of infection.

== Events ==
The Umrao Hospitals have held many medical camps for screening of various ailments in the society. It recently held a cardiac screening camp for senior citizens in the premises of Narsinh Govindrao Vartak High School in Virar.
