= Mahrukh Inayet =

Indian television journalist

Mahrukh Inayet is a journalist, news anchor, and a Managing Partner at Studio Talk, a media training, research, and production company. Her work as a journalist includes coverage of the Taj hotel attacks during the 26/11 Mumbai terror attacks for Times Now, a 24-hour Indian news channel.

== Early life and education ==
Inayet was born and raised in Kashmir, India. She has a Master's degree in journalism from American University. In 2012, she completed the Georgetown Leadership Seminar at the Walsh School of Foreign Service at Georgetown University.

== Career ==
Her journalism career began during the September 11 attacks in the United States. She previously worked for National Geographic and Headlines Today before her work for Times Now in Mumbai. After the Mumbai 26/11 attacks, Mahrukh was in the field for nearly 62 hours. The Quint described her as reporting "at the centre of it all." She was praised in the Hindustan Times for doing "a fine job" during the crisis, as compared to other reporters.

Inayet also co-anchored the prime time news show The Newshour with the Times Now editor-in-chief Arnab Goswami. In 2010, The Hindu reported on social networks, and the responses of some users to Times Now, including "Ethnic-Kashmiri anchor Mahrukh Inayet comes in for unprintable abuse targeting her gender."

In 2012, Inayet resigned from her position as senior editor at Times Now and began work at Studio Talk.

In 2014, she used her Twitter account to help authorities find areas in need of rescue during the massive flooding in Jammu and Kashmir.

== Commentary ==
In addition to her work as a journalist, Inayet has engaged in public commentary, such as to SheThePeople.TV in 2017 about sexism in the media, where she stated that male journalists do not experience the same intensity of "trolling" as female journalists.

In 2019, The Times of India reported that she repeatedly tweeted during the telephone and internet blackout after the Kashmir territory was designated, including, "How will Dogras & Kashmiris know it's a great day for them if their phones are not working? And how are we going to know that they are ok? Can I pls talk to my mother? #Kashmir" and "Day 5: No news from my mother. I pray she is fine but can I pls know that she is. How is this even being allowed? #Kashmir #OpenPhoneLines." Scroll.in also reported one her tweets during this time.

In 2021, she provided commentary to The News Minute about independent media and democracy.

== Honors and awards ==
- 2009 Outstanding Achievement as a Media Personality, Government of Jammu and Kashmir
- 2013 eNBA 'Best Spot News Reporting' award
- 2014 Chief Guest at the Fr. Conceicao Rodrigues Memorial Debate

== Personal life ==
Inayet is Muslim. She is divorced.
