= José Pereira (scholar) =

Scholar and artist (1931–2015)

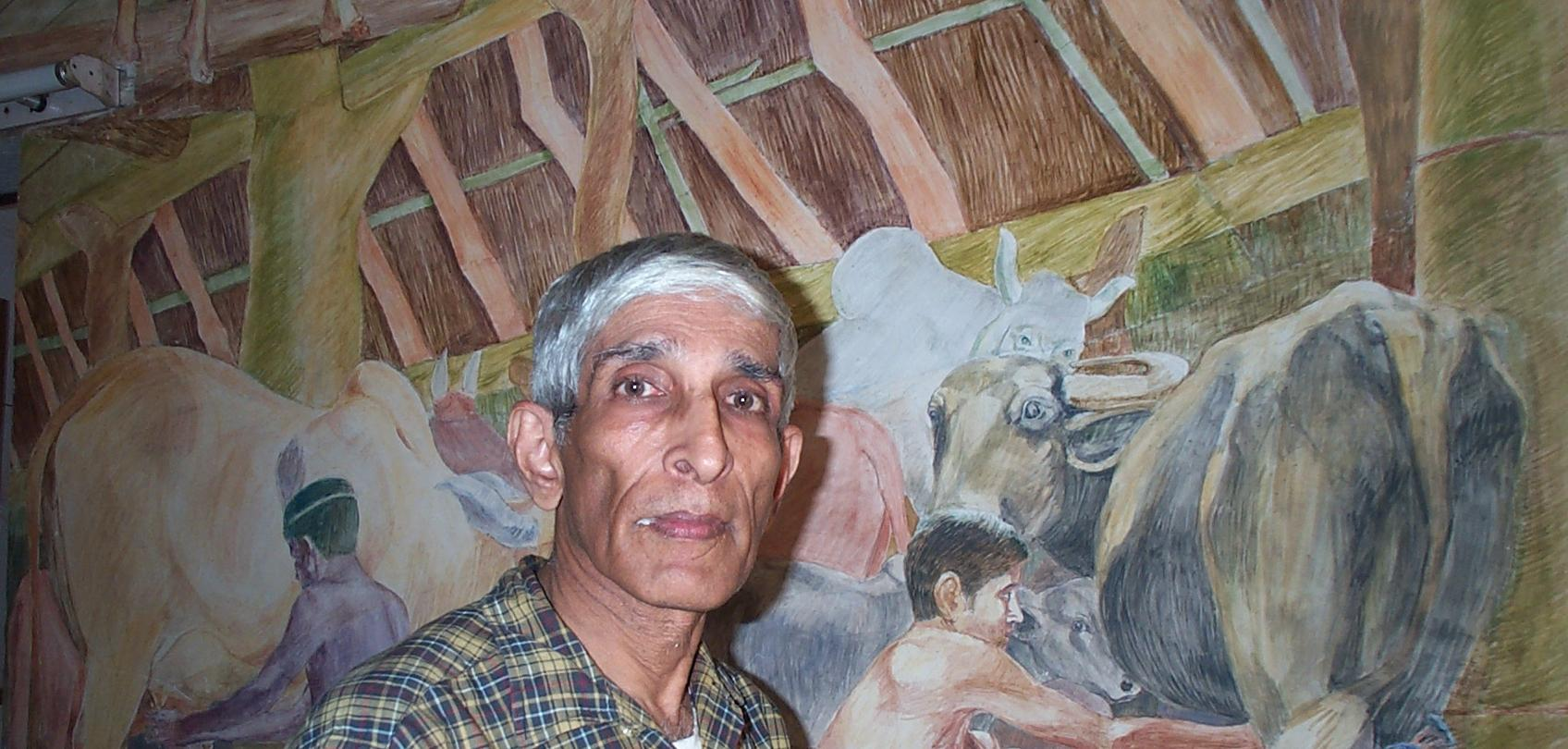
- Born: 22 January 1931; Bombay, Bombay Presidency, British India
- Died: 26 January 2015 (aged 84); New York City, U.S.
- Occupations: Scholar; historian; writer; artist; linguist
- Awards: Padma Bhushan (2012)

José Pereira (22 January 1931 – 26 January 2015) was a Sanskrit scholar, historian, writer, artist, and linguist of Goan origin.

== Early life and education ==
José Pereira was born on 22 January 1931 in Bombay to a Goan family who hailed from Curtorim. He received his PhD in Ancient History and Culture from St Xavier's College in 1949. He later graduated, with honours, from Siddharth College of Arts, Science and Commerce in 1951. In 1959, he traveled to Portugal as a guest lecturer at the Insituto Superior de Estudoes Ultramarinos in Lisbon. A year later, he departed Lisbon following his public statement that “Goa has a cultural identity of its own and can never be a showcase of the greatness of the Portuguese."

== Career ==
Pereira was the author of 24 books and 145 journal articles. He was internationally recognised for his fresco paintings. His first works, titled "Images of Goa", were exhibited in Bombay when he was 18 while still a student at J J School of Art and later exhibited in Union Territory of Delhi in 1969.

== Personal life ==
Pereira was fluent in at least 13 languages. In particular, he was a strong supporter of the Konkani language.

== Recognition ==
In 2012, the Government of India conferred the Padma Bhushan, the third-highest civilian award of India, in recognition of Pereira's work in the field of Indian history and literature. He is considered to be the only Goan to be conferred this award while being a non-resident Indian.

== Controversy ==
In later life, his "Epiphanies of the Hindu Gods" caused Hindu fundamentalists to protest in 2010 due to the nudity in the artwork. Pereira countered with quotations from Sanskrit scriptures that justified the piece.
