= Shah & Anchor Kutchhi Engineering College =

Engineering College in Mumbai

Shah and Anchor Kutchhi Engineering College
- Type: Education, engineering, private
- Established: 1985; 41 years ago
- Affiliations: University of Mumbai
- Principal: Bhavesh Patel
- Academic staff: 163
- Undergraduates: 1440
- Postgraduates: 156
- Location: Mumbai, India; 19.04821°N 72.9116°E
- Website: shahandanchor.com

Shah & Anchor Kutchhi Engineering College is an engineering college in Mumbai affiliated under University Of Mumbai. The college offers technical education to students. It was established by the Mahavir Education Trust in 1985.

In 2021 the college was graded 'A' by NAAC for 5 years. The Computer Engineering and Information Technology branches are accredited by NBA.

Shah and Anchor Kutchhi Engineering College was placed in the 251– 300 band in the NIRF 2020

rankings.

== History ==
In 1983 the Mahavir Education Trust was established.

The college offers the Bachelor of Engineering course of the University of Mumbai. Funds for the development of the college are augmented by donations from philanthropists and industrialists. The college is run by the Mahavir Education Trust, which was established to develop education in the technical field.

== Environment ==
Shah & Anchor Kutchhi Engineering College is located on Waman Tukaram Patil Marg, Chembur. The nearest railway station is Govandi, and Deonar Bus Depot on the Mumbai– Pune Highway is within walking distance. All laboratories, classrooms, the drawing hall, students' room, sports hall and administrative office are situated in the college's seven-storeyed building.

== Courses ==
=== Bachelor of Technology(B.Tech.) ===
==== Departments ====
The college has an intake capacity of 600 students in three branches for the Bachelor of Engineering degree:

- Electronics and Computer Science Engineering – 120 seats
- Computer Engineering – 180 seats
- Information Technology – 120 seats
- Electronics and telecommunications – 60 seats (started from 2012)
- Artificial Intelligence and Data Science - 60 seats ( Started from 2020)
- Cyber Security - 60 seats ( Started from 2020)
- VLSL - 60 seats
- ACT - 60 seats

In addition, diploma holders equal to 10% of each branch's intake are admitted each year directly into the second year of the bachelor's degree.

==== Infrastructure and Facilities ====
The college has furnished classrooms. Most have a capacity of around 75 seats, while some larger classrooms have nearly double that capacity. The college has an auditorium that seats 120. There is also an engineering drawing hall.

The college library has a reading hall, university-prescribed textbooks, reference material and a collection of books related to the curriculum, as well as a few books on self-improvement and personality development. It subscribes to a number of national and international technical journals. The college is also a member of IEL Online, through which IEEE journals can be accessed. Web browsing facilities are also available in the library. The library is open six days a week, and on Sundays when exams are approaching.

A

Canara Bank extension counter has been provided for the exclusive use of the staff and students of the college and polytechnic. The in-house canteen provides a variety of food items. A gymkhana with facilities for table tennis, carrom and chess has been provided.

=== Master of Engineering (M.E.) ===
The Master of Engineering section at Shah and Anchor was affiliated with Mumbai University in 2011.

- Electronics Engineering – 9 seats
- Computer Engineering - 9 seats
- Information Technology - 9 seats

== Student life ==
Lectures and practicals are mainly conducted between 9.15am and 5.00pm, with an occasional early extra class. Students take part in various technical, cultural and athletic extracurricular activities, and the gymkhana often remains open after hours. In addition to the canteen, there are two food stalls by a side gate. The grounds behind the college are used during lunch breaks and the sports season. Many students are members of the college's student organizations, which conduct workshops and seminars.

These student organizations are the main source of extracurricular and technical activities hosted by the college.

=== Institute of Electrical and Electronics Engineers ===
IEEE-SAKEC is the student chapter of the Institute of Electrical and Electronics Engineers. It helps organize Nucleus, an annual intercollegiate technical symposium. Apart from organizing events in the college, such as international university fairs and technical and non-technical seminars and workshops, it organizes a yearly industrial visit to other parts of the country.

=== Indian Society for Technical Education ===
ISTE-SAKEC is the student chapter of the Indian Society for Technical Education, established in 2005. It organizes workshops, seminars and field trips. It helps organize Nucleus, the annual intercollegiate technical symposium.

=== Computer Society of India ===
CSI-SAKEC is the student chapter of the Computer Society of India. It conducts workshops during holidays for SAKEC students. In March 2010, the students started a CSI website and a CSI magazine, Cache.

=== Institute of Electronics and Telecommunication Engineers ===
IETE-SAKEC is the student chapter of the Institute of Electronics and Telecommunication Engineers. The chapter aims to bring together the students of the college's Electronics and Telecommunication branch. At its opening ceremony, the chairman unveiled the organization's name (IETE-SAKEC) using a remote- controlled curtain raiser.

== Festivals ==
The college holds multiple events in its annual festival. They are broadly classified into six categories: Nucleus (the technical festival), R1 (a national- level robotics event), Verve (the cultural festival), Marathon, Olympus (comprising all sports- based events) and Portal.

=== Nucleus ===
Nucleus is SAKEC's annual technical symposium, featuring technical events and contests for all Mumbai University students. It is jointly organised by the student bodies and the college student council. Companies such as HP, Videocon, Bank of Baroda, Samsonite, Charagh Din, MTNL and Asian Paints have been associated with it. It draws more than 3000 students from 50 colleges across the city. It aims to give students practical experience beyond their usual syllabus.

Nucleus hosts the following events:

Technical: The technical events are widely ranged, from coding competitions, events involving practical and interdisciplinary knowledge and various contests that explore creativity and curiosity among students.

Non-technical: There are also a variety of non-technical events associated with the festival. The prominent ones include contests that encourage lateral thinking. There is also a Minute to Win it based contest as well as a gaming contest. Simulation events include handling a virtual IPL team and getting placed via interview.

Robotics: The robotics based events are one of the most prominent features of the technical fest. Together, the events incorporate challenges for the first three levels of robotics.

Challenges include robots playing football, Pacman, maneuvering through various themed courses, remote maze navigation, autonomous line following as well as a robot battle and many others.

=== R1 ===
R1 is a national-level robotics event held annually in the college grounds. Sponsored by the memorial trust of the late student Monish Gala, it consists of racing events. The first edition was held in 2009 and was conceived and organized by Gala. A dirt race of both wired and wireless internal combustion engine robotic cars is held at the college ground. The event draws participants from engineering colleges across India.

=== Verve ===
Verve is the annual intercollegiate cultural festival of the college. It hosts events across a wide range of genres.

Harmonix: One of the main attractions of verve, Harmonix is a musical competition among student bands from across the city. Every year, prominent local bands are also invited to play in the event.

Nrityanjali: Nrityanjali is an inter-college dance competition.

Model United Nations: SakecMUN is one of the few Model United Nations being hosted among Mumbai's schools and colleges.

Intra Events: A variety of miscellaneous intra-college events take place, such as a fashion show and The Apprentice.

=== Marathon ===
The SAKEC Marathon began as an event to commemorate the 25th anniversary of the college and was held during the 2010 college festival.

It has since been held annually. Students from across the city compete in a one-mile run through the roads of Chembur.

=== Olympus ===
Olympus is the college's annual sports festival. Intercollegiate events range from football and table tennis to chess and carrom. More than 60 teams from engineering and medical colleges participate. Intercollegiate competitions started in 2009 and have since expanded. Intra-Olympus also includes a variety of sports, ranging from outdoor games such as cricket, football and volleyball to indoor games such as chess and carrom.

=== Web portal ===
Nucleus also hosts a variety of web-based games and events that require on-line participation. These include Google Whack, CodeChef competitions, Web Hunt and Virtual Stock Exchange.

== Campus recruitment ==
Recruiters include consulting, engineering and software development firms, among them Tata Consultancy Services, Mastek, Wipro, Syntel, iGATE, Blue Star Infotech, Amdocs, Oracle Financial Services Software (previously iFlex), Indus Valley Partners, Mphasis, Larsen & Toubro Infotech, Capgemini, Tech Mahindra, Accenture, GE Energy, Vistaar, Webaroo (now SMS GupShup) and Godrej Infotech.

== See also ==
- University of Mumbai
- List of Mumbai Colleges
