= St. Francis Institute of Technology =

Coordinates: 19.2436°N 72.8559°E

St. Francis Institute of Technology, Mumbai
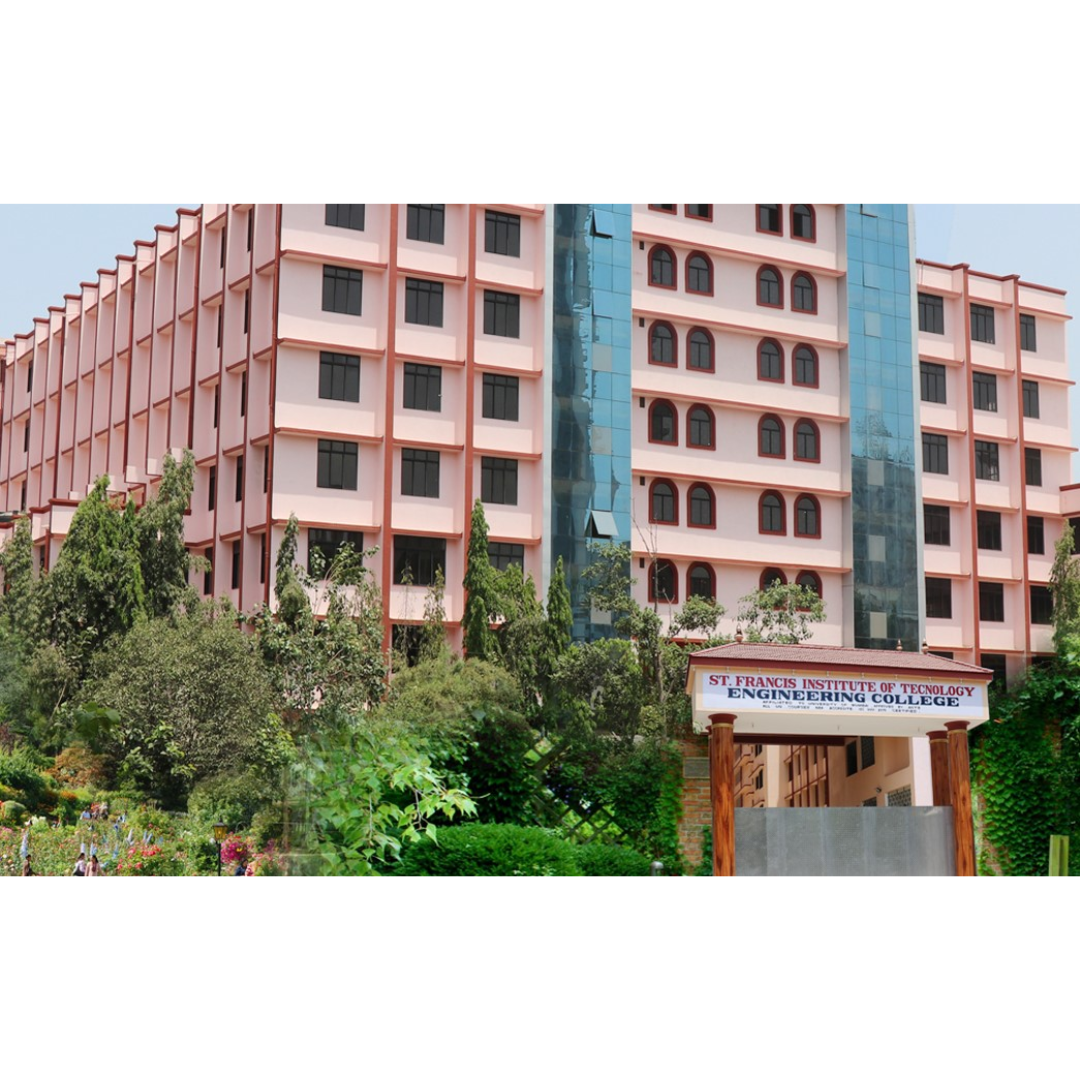
- Type: Engineering College
- Established: 1999
- Accreditation: ISO, NBA, NAAC
- Affiliations: University of Mumbai
- Principal: Dr. Sincy George
- Director: Bro. Shantilal Kujur
- Students: 1476
- Undergraduates: 1440
- Postgraduates: 36
- Location: Mumbai, Maharashtra, India
- Campus: 5 acres; Urban,
- Website: https://www.sfit.ac.in/

St. Francis Institute of Technology (SFIT) in Mumbai, India, is an engineering college named after Francis of Assisi, the 12th-century Italian saint. The college is accredited by the ISO and the National Board of Accreditation, approved by the AICTE, and affiliated with the University of Mumbai.

The college is managed by the Society of Franciscan Brothers, with special consideration given to Roman Catholic students. It offers undergraduate, post-graduate, and doctoral courses in engineering. It is the first Catholic Technical Institute in India to acquire 'minority status.'

== Courses ==
=== Graduate courses ===
Each department listed below offers courses in their respective disciplines towards a BE degree.

- Electronics and telecommunications (E&T)
- B.E. (Computer Engineering)
- B.E. (Information Technology)
- B.E. (Electrical Engineering)
- B.E. (Mechanical Engineering)

Admissions for Electrical & Mechanical Engineering started in June–July 2018. The 2022 graduating B.E. class will be the very first to have companies specifically coming for campus placements only pertaining to that respective field.

=== Postgraduate courses ===
Each department listed below offers courses in their respective disciplines towards an ME degree.

- M. E. (Computer Engineering)
- M. E. (Electronics and Telecommunication Engineering)

=== Courses for the PhD in Technology ===
Each department listed below offers courses in their respective disciplines towards a PhD degree.

- PhD (Computer Engineering)
- PhD (Electronics and Telecommunication Engineering).

=== PhD (Technology) Degree courses ===
Each department listed below offers courses in their respective disciplines towards a PhD degree:

- PhD (Computer Engineering)
- PhD (Electronics and Telecommunication Engineering)

== Campus ==
The SFIT campus is in IC Colony, Borivali, spread over 5 acres (20,000 m^{2}) of land in the western suburbs of Mumbai. The institute has an open access library, gymkhana with a table tennis room, carrom room and a chess room. There are facilities for outdoor games like throwball, football, basketball, volleyball and badminton.

== See also ==
- University of Mumbai
- List of Mumbai Colleges
