= Mahatma Gandhi Mission's College of Engineering and Technology =

College in Maharashtra, India

- Motto: In Pursuit of Excellence
- Type: Private
- Established: 1982
- Accreditation: NAAC Grade:B+
- Chairman: Kamal Kishore Kadam
- Director: K.G.Narayankhedkar; Geeta S. Latkar
- Students: 93
- Address: Kamothe, Navi Mumbai, Maharashtra, India; 19°02′35″N 73°01′31″E
- Campus: Urban
- Affiliations: Mumbai University
- Website: mgmmumbai.ac.in/mgmcet/home

Mahatma Gandhi Mission's College of Engineering and Technology (MGMCET) is one of the chain of educational institutions set up by the Mahatma Gandhi Mission, a Charitable Trust Act 1950 and Societies Regulation Act 1860. It was founded in 1982 and is situated in Kamothe, Navi Mumbai, India. The college is affiliated to the University of Mumbai and approved by AICTE, New Delhi.

MGM is a chain of engineering, medical, nursing, management, dental, physiotherapy, science, journalism, and fine arts, computer science and information technology, schools spread over four educational centers in Navi Mumbai, Nanded, Aurangabad, and Noida.

The college provides hostel facilities and bus services to its students. It is one of the oldest colleges in Navi Mumbai. The college also has a ground for sports like cricket, volleyball, and football.

== Departments ==
- Computer Science
- Computer Engineering
- Electronics and Telecommunication Engineering
- Mechanical Engineering
- Civil Engineering
- Chemical Engineering
- Biotechnology Engineering
- Biomedical Engineering
- Electrical Engineering
- Automobile Engineering

== Students' activities ==
A collegiate club is affiliated to the Society of Automobile Engineers India. The students undertake various workshops and industrial visits giving them hands-on experience of the automobile industry. They also participate in various competitions organized by SAEINDIA. A team from the club, MGM Accellors, participated in SUPRA SAEINDA 2015, held at MMRT Chennai. The team secured a 36th overall rank.

The college fest is conducted around February and March. The theme for each year is different and is decided by the student body with the guidance of the faculty. Inter-departmental competitions are also an integral part of the fest. Events organized during Fest:

- Fun Arete: it is the annual cultural fest of MGMCET
- Action Arete: it is the annual spots fest of MGMCET
- Tech Arete: it is the annual technical fest of MGMCE

== In popular culture ==
The college is shown in Taarak Mehta Ka Ooltah Chashmah. The quintets or Tapu Sena studies here.Famous personalities such as Siddhesh, Nakul Darunte, Tanmay Kajrolkar and Aditya Gaikwad have studied in this college.

== See also ==
- List of colleges in Mumbai
