= South Indians' Welfare Society College =

College in Mumbai, India

S.I.W.S. N.R. Swamy College of Commerce & Economics and Smt. Thirumalai College of Science(S.I.W.S College)
- Students: 50,000+
- Location: Mumbai, India
- Website: http://siwscollege.edu.in

South Indian Welfare Society (SIWS) was founded in 1934 with an objective to provide educational facilities to the local population. Initially, the society started a primary school at Shivaji Park, Dadar in 1934 and another at Matunga in 1936.

SIWS is a combination of N.R. Swamy College of arts and Economics and Smt. Thirumalai College of Science.

Later, a high school was started to meet the growing needs of its own students of the primary schools with the first batch passing the S.S.C Examination in 1947. Presently the primary and secondary schools of the Society instruct 4,000 students.

In 1976, a Junior College of the commerce stream was started with the goal of providing higher education to a section of its own students. This was followed by the opening of a Degree College in Commerce and Economics in June 1980.

The junior and degree classes are conducted in their own building equipped with facilities. In April 1983, the first batch students appeared for their T.Y.B.Com. Degree Examination of the Mumbai University. In 1988-89, the Society started the Junior College in Science attached to the Degree College with well-equipped laboratories. This was soon followed by the Degree College of Science affiliated to the University of Bombay from June 1990 and thus came the Smt. Thirumalai College of Sciences. The first batch of Students appeared for TYBSc in April 1993.

== In the news ==
In April 2018, the students joined other college wards and cleaned up part of the eight mangrove areas in city. In July 2017, the College of Economics and Commerce in Wadala got a notice for charging capitation fee.
