= Mira Road =

- Suburb in the Western Suburbs of Mumbai
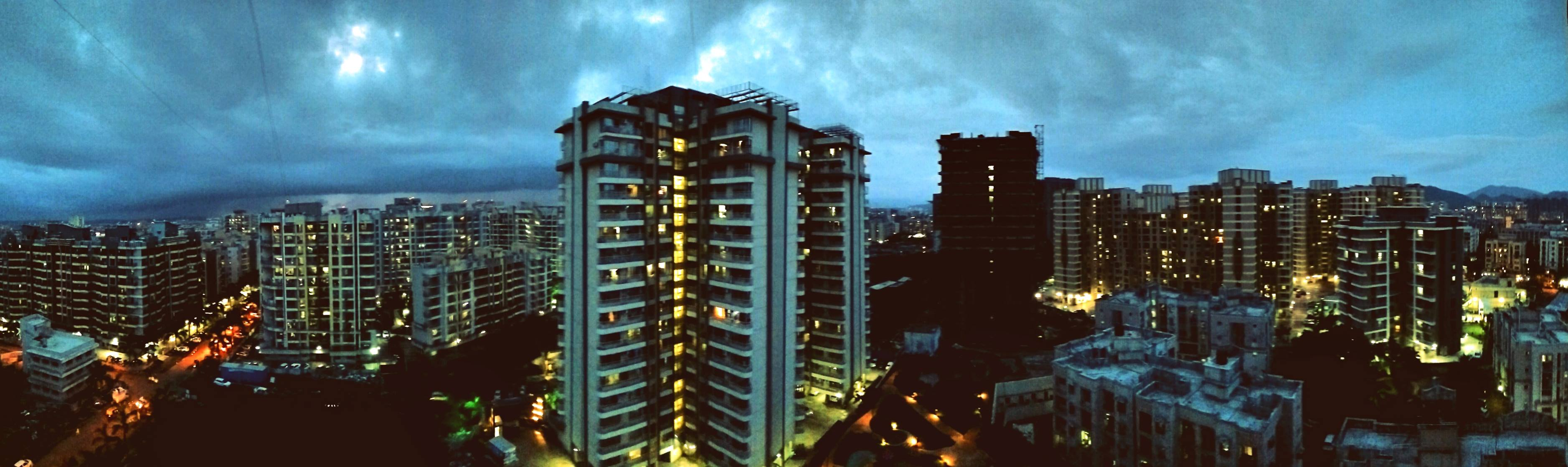

- Location in Maharashtra, India Mira Road (Maharashtra) Mira Road (India)
- Coordinates: 19.28°N 72.86°E
- State: Maharashtra
- Region: Mumbai
- District: Thane

Government
  - Type: Municipal Corporation
  - Body: Mira-Bhayandar Municipal Corporation
  - Mayor: Smt. Jyotsna Hansale (BJP)
- Elevation: 6.4 m (21 ft)

Languages
  - Official: Marathi
- Time zone: UTC+05:30 (IST)
- PIN: Mira Road (West) - 401107 Mira Road (East) - 401104, 401107
- Telephone code: (+91) 022
- Vehicle registration: MH 58 - Mira-Bhayandar
- Lok Sabha Constituency: Thane
- Website: mbmc.gov.in

Mira Road (Marathi pronunciation: [miɾaː]) is a suburb north of Mumbai, in Thane District, and is part of the Mumbai Metropolitan Region. It falls within the jurisdiction of Mira-Bhayander, Vasai-Virar Police Commissionerate. Mira Road is situated in the north-western portion of Salsette Island, Maharashtra state, India.

== History ==
The rise of Mumbai's real estate prices has been instrumental in the development of the Mira-Bhayandar region. From 1947 onwards, primarily developed by Bharat Shah, the rise in real estate prices prompted several largely lower- and middle-income families to migrate to the satellite cities of Mumbai, like Virar, Vasai, and Nalasopara. At that time, the Mira-Bhayandar area was part of a Gram Panchayat, and consisted primarily of agricultural land, majorly rice. This delayed and deterred builders from starting development projects. By 1980, builders began to buy agricultural land and start developing townships.

The Mira Bhayandar Municipal Council was set up on June 12, 1985, by integrating five Gram Panchayats, which included the Mira Gram Panchayat, from which Mira Road got its name.

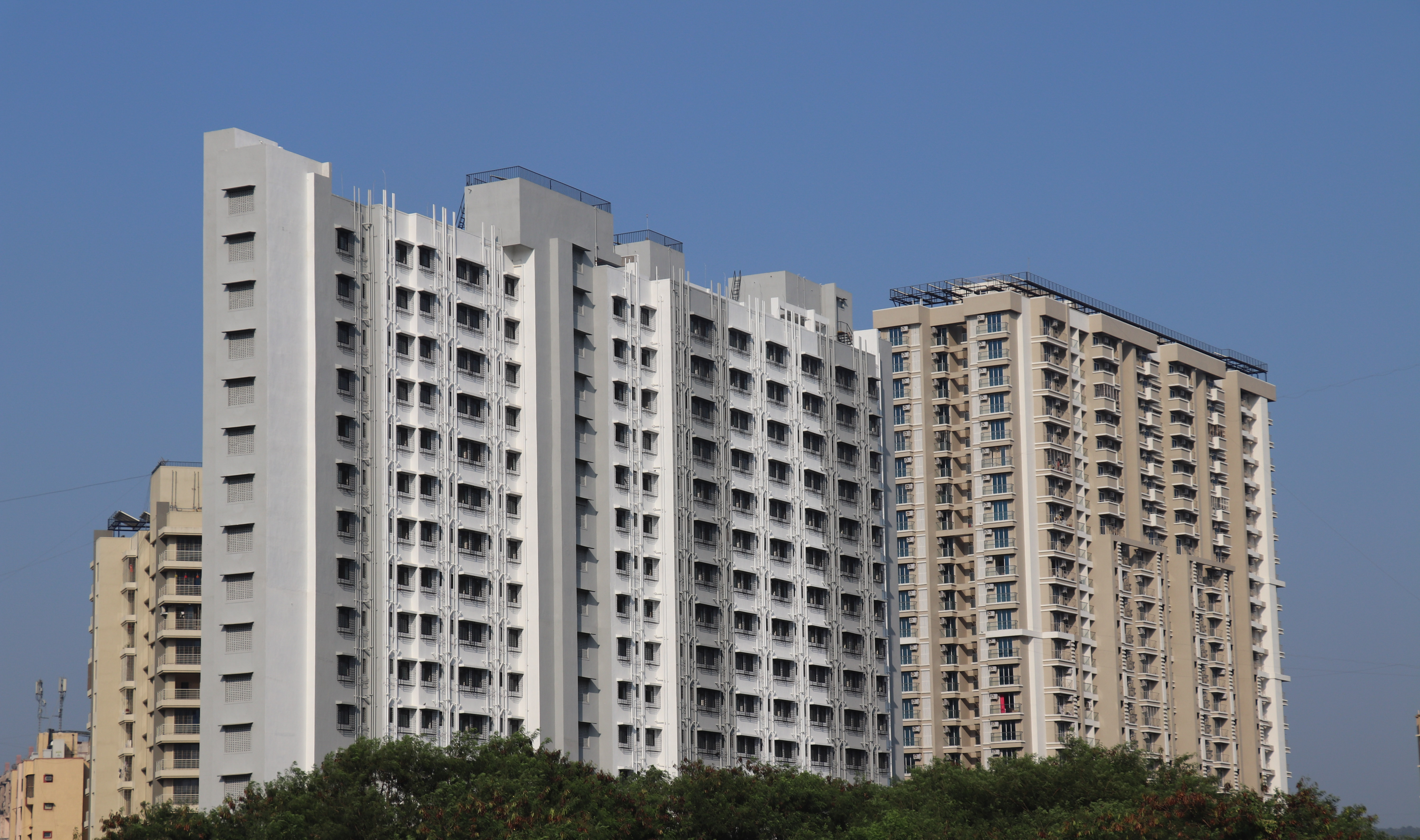
An apartment in Mira Road (East)

By 1990, the council was extended, and it held the first election. Gilbert Mendonca was elected as the first president of the Mira-Bhayandar Municipal Council.

As it is located very close to the city, with easy accessibility by road as well as railway, and the facilities for the city also extending to this town, have resulted in an increase in population, and Mira Bhayandar as a whole, developed further.

The Municipal Council later on, 28 February 2002, was changed to a Municipal Corporation due to its large population, and had its first elected mayor, Smt. Maira Mendonca on 11 August. Mira Road and its neighbouring suburb Bhayandar began emerging as a fast-developing suburb and experienced economic development mainly due to its manufacturing sector. Most of the development has occurred only on the east side, whereas the west side of the railway line is covered with salt pans and mangroves.

== Demographics ==
Mira Road is in the northern part of Mumbai City and lies in the North West ward within the jurisdiction of the Municipal Corporation. Mira Road has three dominant languages, with a large Gujarati community residing in most of the suburbs of Northern Mumbai that stretches from Bhayander to Bandra, it is also shown in the linguistic demography of the suburb, while the official language Marathi, is spoken by the natives of the land and migrants from other parts of Maharashtra, Hindi is the main language of communication and in trade and commerce in the suburban region of Mumbai and Mumbai Metropolitan region, it is spoken by most of the North Indian community as their native language. Marathi, the official language, is the mother tongue of 35.13% mostly in Uttan and Gorai area, while the dominant language, Gujarati is mother tongue by 30.62% of the population and Hindi by 24.90% as their mother tongue. Hindi is by far, the major language spoken as the language of communication by all the people living in the suburbs and metropolitan area of Mumbai as their language of communication.

== Geography ==
Mira Road is located on the northern portion of Salsette Island and at the northern part of the Konkan region. Mira Road, along with Bhayandar comes which is under the jurisdiction of Mira Bhayandar Municipal Corporation. The entire Mira-Bhayandar region lies just outside the Mumbai Suburban district and officially belongs to Thane district, despite being closer to the island of Mumbai. The Mira-Bhayandar region comprises an area of 79 km^{2}. A marshy creek divides Mumbai and Mira Road. The western part of the city is completely made up of barren lands, where salt pans were situated in the past. In the north lies Vasai Creek, to the east the Sanjay Gandhi National Park and the Uttan coast, to the west. It mainly is of Deccan lava terrain and consists of waterlogged and marshy areas. The climate experienced here is a tropical, wet and dry climate.

== Transport ==
Power from Tata Power and Reliance Energy, MTNL telecom services and BEST bus services which are normally provided to the city, are provided to this region too, which has been instrumental in the increase in its population, unlike Vasai and Virar.

Red Line (Mumbai Metro) and Western line (Mumbai Suburban Railway) and BEST provide the mainstay of the transport services in Mira Road.

== Hospitals ==
- Bhaktivedanta Hospital
- Wockhardt Hospital (Umrao Hospital)

== Schools / Academy ==
- Sardar Vallabhbhai Patel Vidyalaya (S.V.P.V)
- N. L. Dalmia High School
- N. L. Dalmia Institute of Management Studies and Research
- Seven Square Academy
- Royal College of Arts, Science and Commerce
- Shree LR Tiwari Engineering College
