= Roshan Dalvi =

Indian judge

Hon'ble Ms. Justice (Retd.) Roshan Dalvi

Judge of the Bombay High Court
- In office June 2005 – 6 November 2015
- Nominated by: Ramesh Chandra Lahoti
- Appointed by: A.P.J. Abdul Kalam

Personal details
- Education: Mumbai University

Roshan Dalvi is a former judge of the Bombay High Court, in Maharashtra, India. As a judge, she adjudicated a number of widely reported and significant cases, including the dispute between the sons of Shiv Sena leader Bal Thackeray regarding their inheritance, and the challenge to a Maharashtra law forbidding dancers in bar from carrying on their profession.

== Career ==
Dalvi practiced law in Mumbai and also taught corporate law, as a visiting faculty member at the Jamnalal Bajaj Institute of Management Studies and Narsee Monjee Institute of Management Studies.

In 1989, Dalvi was appointed as a judge in the City Civil and Sessions Court in Mumbai. In 2004, she was the principal judge of the Family Court in Mumbai. She was appointed to the Bombay High Court in June 2005.

=== Notable judgements ===
In 2006, Dalvi along with judge F. I. Rebello held that a law framed by the Maharashtra government to forbid dancers in bar from carrying on their profession was unconstitutional, and struck it down. Dalvi and Rebello, in a widely reported judgement, directed the state to ensure that minors were not involved in the profession, but apart from that, held that the government could not justify the prohibition on grounds of morality. Their ruling was upheld by the Indian Supreme Court, and an attempt to reintroduce the ban by subsequent legislation did not succeed.

In 2010, Dalvi held that parties could not appoint representatives to conduct their cases in Family Courts in Mumbai, holding that in the absence of qualifications or guidelines about such representatives, the courts would be "overrun by any number of unqualified, unenrolled persons".

In 2011, Dalvi was part of a bench of five judges that held that police officers were not required to give prior notice before freezing the bank accounts of persons being investigated, holding that principles of natural justice did not apply in this case.

In 2013, Dalvi held that both parents had an equal claim to guardianship of a child in the case of divorce, and that the default guardian was not necessarily the father. Also in the same year, Dalvi held in a significant ruling that complaints filed under the Domestic Violence Act can only be filed while the domestic relationship is ongoing, and not after it has ended.

In 2015, Dalvi convicted two persons of offences relating to fraud and corruption, in relation to the 1992 Indian stock market scam, and acquitted fourteen others. Following this conviction, several others, including Indian stockbroker, Harshad Mehta, also were convicted of related offences.

Dalvi has also adjudicated in a number of significant cases involving public figures, including the dispute between politician Uddhav Thackeray and his brother over property belonging to their father, the deceased Shiv Sena leader Bal Thackeray, a case concerning assault charges against Nikhil Daswani, the heir to the Charagh Din clothing brand, and a property dispute between industrialists and business men, G.L. Raheja and Nusli Wadia.

=== Corruption allegations ===
In 2015, film producer Sanjay Punamiya accused Dalvi of corruption during court proceedings regarding a property dispute involving Punamiya. Punamiya stated in court that he had met Dalvi's husband, Shamim Dalvi, who had promised him a favourable order in the case in exchange for Rs.2.5 million. In response, Dalvi ordered Punamiya and his legal representative to be taken into judicial custody for the offence of contempt of court. The Bombay Lawyers' Association made a representation to the Chief Justice of the Bombay High Court, protesting against Dalvi's order of detention. On 30 July 2015, Punamiya withdrew his complaint and offered an "unconditional apology" to Dalvi.

== Judicial reforms ==
Following her retirement from judicial service, Dalvi has engaged in public consultations about judicial reforms in India.

In 2017, Dalvi was appointed as a member of a panel constituted by the Maharashtra government to address the trafficking and sexual exploitation of children in India The panel recommended prosecution guidelines in case of such offences, as well as the establishment of specially trained police units, and a helpline. Dalvi has also spoken publicly about the need for distinct legislation and improved judicial infrastructure to address human trafficking.

In 2019 she spoke at a judges' conclave on the need for better infrastructure in courts addressing crimes against children, noting that in Mumbai courts, the juvenile victim was often placed between two sets of wooden cupboards in the court in order to separate them from the accused offender.

== Personal life ==
Dalvi earned a Bachelor of Commerce (B.Com) and a Master of Laws (LL.M) from Mumbai University. She was appointed as a Fellow of the Government Law College in Mumbai.
