= Dr. V. N. Bedekar Institute of Management Studies =

- Thane, Maharashtra, 400610; India

Information
- School type: Private
- Opened: 1973
- Gender: Co-education
- Language: Marathi and English

The Dr. V. N. Bedekar Institute of Management Studies (BRIMS) is a school of management and finance in Thane, India. It is part of VPM Institutes.

BRIMS was established on 3 July 1973. It was then named as Department of Management Studies.

== Academics ==
Courses offered:

- Master in Management Studies (MMS)
- P. G. Diploma in Management (PGDM)

Autonomous courses:

- EpMBA – (Pharma / General )
- Certificate Programmes - Retail Mgmt; Foreign Trade,
- Banking Insurance, Tax Mgmt; Supply Chain & Logistic
- Language Courses - German, French, Japanese, Chinese, Spanish

== Infrastructure ==
The BRIMS campus is spread over 13.5 acres (55,000 m^{2}) of land.

=== Library ===
The Library holds a collection of books, research reports, magazines, journals and periodicals. As of 2021 it was stocked with 14,342 books with subscriptions to 9,000 e-books, 23 national and 6 international journals along with 31 e-journals and 10 newspapers. The library provides database search facilities, including to the ProQuest, J-Gate and CRISIL databases.

=== Auditorium ===
Thorale Bajirao Peshwe Sabhagruha has a seating capacity of 300. Panini Sabha Gruha hall is designed in a theatre style with tiered seating arrangement which can accommodate up to 200 students.

=== Recreation ===
Recreation facility includes well maintained, multicuisine canteen, boys and girls common room and sports facilities like carrom, table-tennis, badminton, chess and cricket.
