= Siddharth College of Law, Mumbai =

Law college in Mumbai

Coordinates: 18°55′51.5″N 72°49′50.2″E

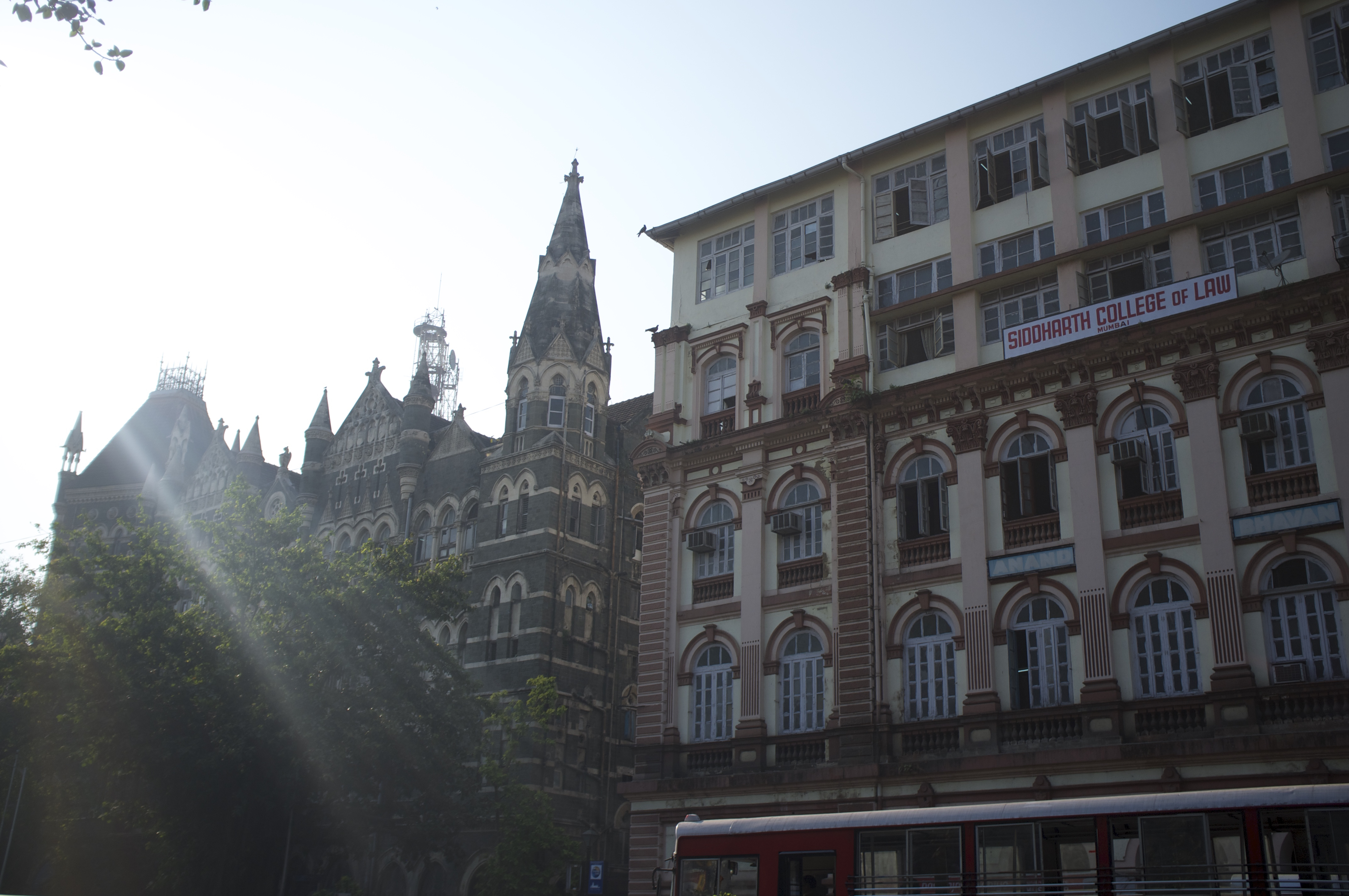
- Siddhartha College of Law, Mumbai
- Established: 1956; 70 years ago
- Academic affiliations: University of Mumbai
- Location: Anand Bhuvan, Fort, Mumbai
- Website: siddharthcollegeoflaw.com//

Siddharth College of Law was founded in Mumbai in 1956. It is run by the People's Education Society which was formed by Dr. Babasaheb Ambedkar on 8 July 1945. The college is affiliated to the University of Mumbai. The college was formed with a vision to spread legal education amongst all sections of society. The college is housed at the Anand Bhavan which has been declared as a heritage structure by the Heritage society of the MMRDA.

== Courses offered ==
Currently the college offers the three years LL.B. course and the five years B.S.L., LL.B course. The college also offers masters in law with specialisation in Criminal as well as Business law. There are also Post Graduate Diploma and Certification courses being conducted by the college.

== Library ==
The Library of the college is said to have a huge collection of books on law. The college is also home to some rare books from Dr. Ambedkar’s personal collection, which were used as reference for drafting the Constitution of India.

== Visits and events ==
In the past the college has been visited by several personalities such as Mrs. Sirimavo Bandaranaike. The events hosted by the college have seen visits by Judges of the Bombay High Court like Justice P. B. Majumdar, Justice Roshan Dalvi and many other legal luminaries. The students of the college were allowed to attend the Mumbai terror attack trial of Qasab, which was otherwise restricted to the general public.

== Notable people associated with the college ==
- B. R. Ambedkar
- Justice R.A. Jahagirdar (Bombay High Court)
- M. C. Setalvad
- Manohar Joshi
- Justice M. C. Chagla
- Farooq Sheikh
- Adv. K. P. Pawar (Court appointed defence lawyer for Mumbai terror trial)
- Suresh Saraiya (Noted radio commentator on cricket)
- Shantaram Naik
- Prakash Yashwant Ambedkar, Politician
- Hitesh Singh, Eminent Jurist
- Gerald Pereira, Indian freedom fighter, author, lawyer and trade unionist from Goa.

== See also ==
- Siddharth College of Arts, Science and Commerce (estb 1946)
