= Universal AI University =

Educational Institution in India

Coordinates: 18.9028°N 73.3747°E

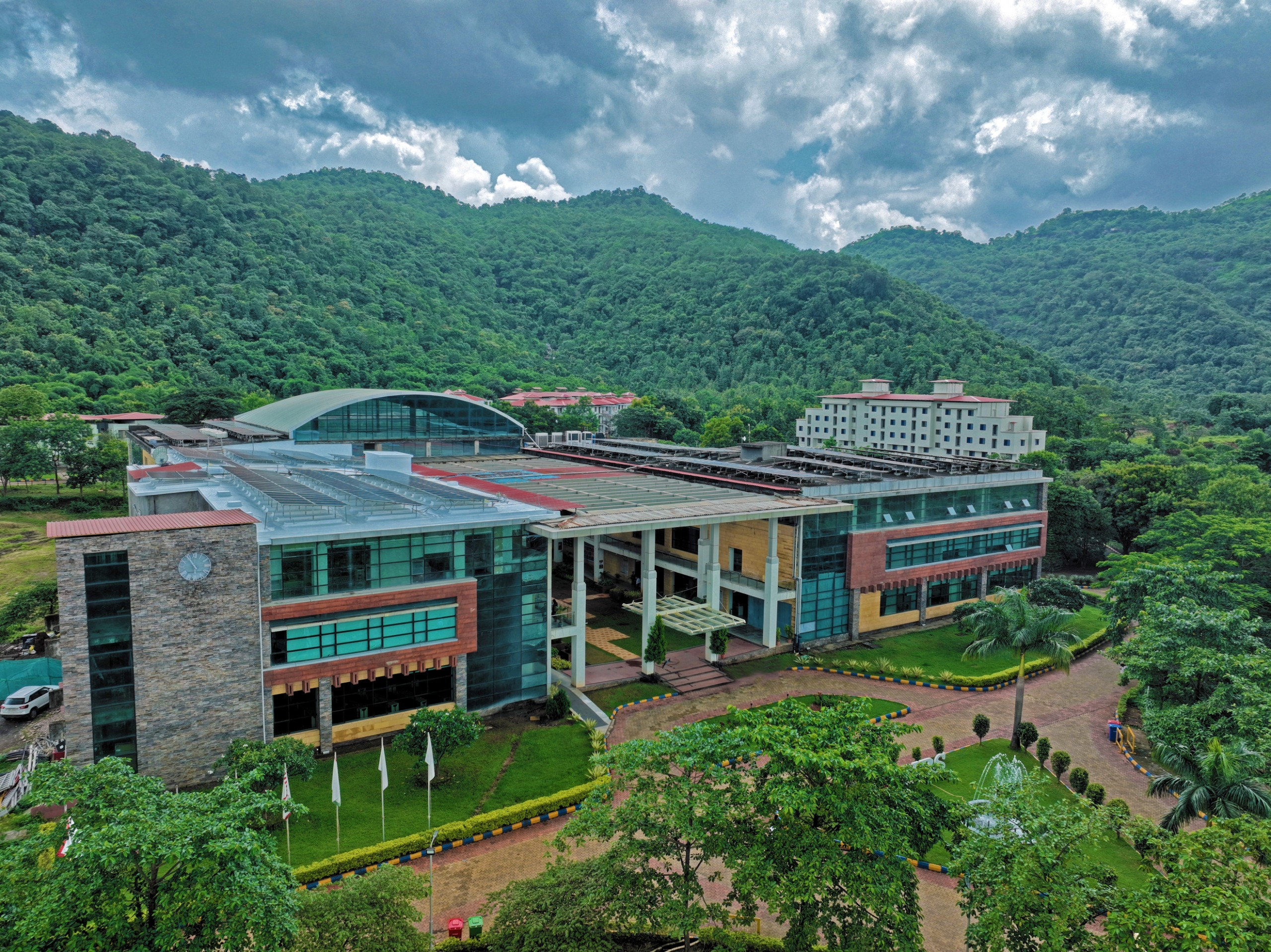
- Motto: The Future is here
- Type: Private University
- Established: 2009; 17 years ago 2023; 3 years ago (as University)
- Founder: Tarundeep Singh Anand
- Accreditation: AICTE, AIU, UGC
- Chancellor: Tarundeep Singh Anand
- Vice-Chancellor: Dr. Simon Mak
- Students: 950 (2025)
- Location: Kushiwali, PO Gaurkamath, Vadap, Karjat, Maharashtra, 410201
- Campus: 40 acres (16 ha); Rural
- Colors: Green, Blue
- Mascot: Hawk-Ai The Hawk
- Website: www.universalai.in
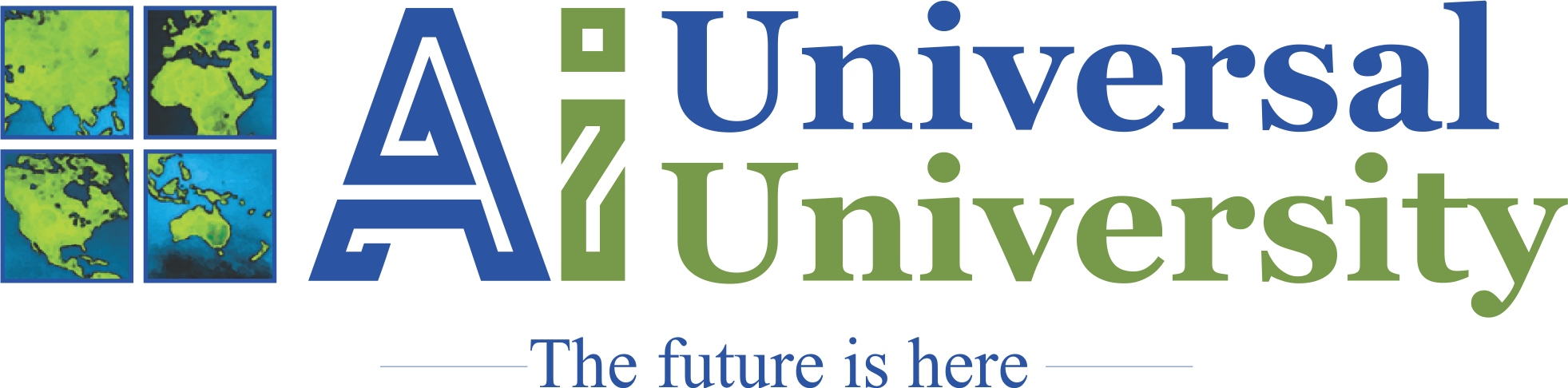

Universal AI University is India's first AI private university in Mumbai, Maharashtra, specialising in courses that embed artificial intelligence (AI) in their design. It offers undergraduate, postgraduate, and doctoral courses across a range of disciplines.

The university was founded in 2009 as Universal Business School and became a university in 2023, after the passing of the Universal AI University, Karjat Act, 2022. It is recognised by the University Grants Commission and the All India Council for Technical Education.The university is India's first dedicated AI University and the third in the world.

== History, governance and leadership ==
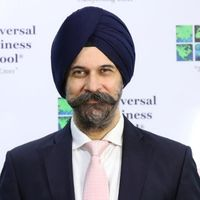
Tarun Anand, Chancellor, Universal AI University

The university was originally established in 2009 as Universal Business School in Karjat, Maharashtra by a group of executives and academics, including Gurdeep Singh Anand (a management consultant and visiting professor at Jamnalal Bajaj Institute of Management Studies) and Tarun Anand (an executive at Thomson Reuters). The institution became Universal AI University in 2023. Tarun Anand has been the chancellor since the university's foundation.

In June 2024 Simon Mak, an international strategist and award-winning professor, joined Universal AI University as its vice chancellor to strengthen the university in areas such as rankings, accreditation, curriculum design, executive education development, and community service programmes. He holds a Bachelor of Technology from the Massachusetts Institute of Technology, and a Master of Business Administration and Doctor of Philosophy from the SMU Cox School of Business. As the former Executive Director of the Caruth Institute for Entrepreneurship at SMU Cox, he oversaw research on blockchain technology and developed a course on Blockchain Entrepreneurship for MBA students.

== Academics ==
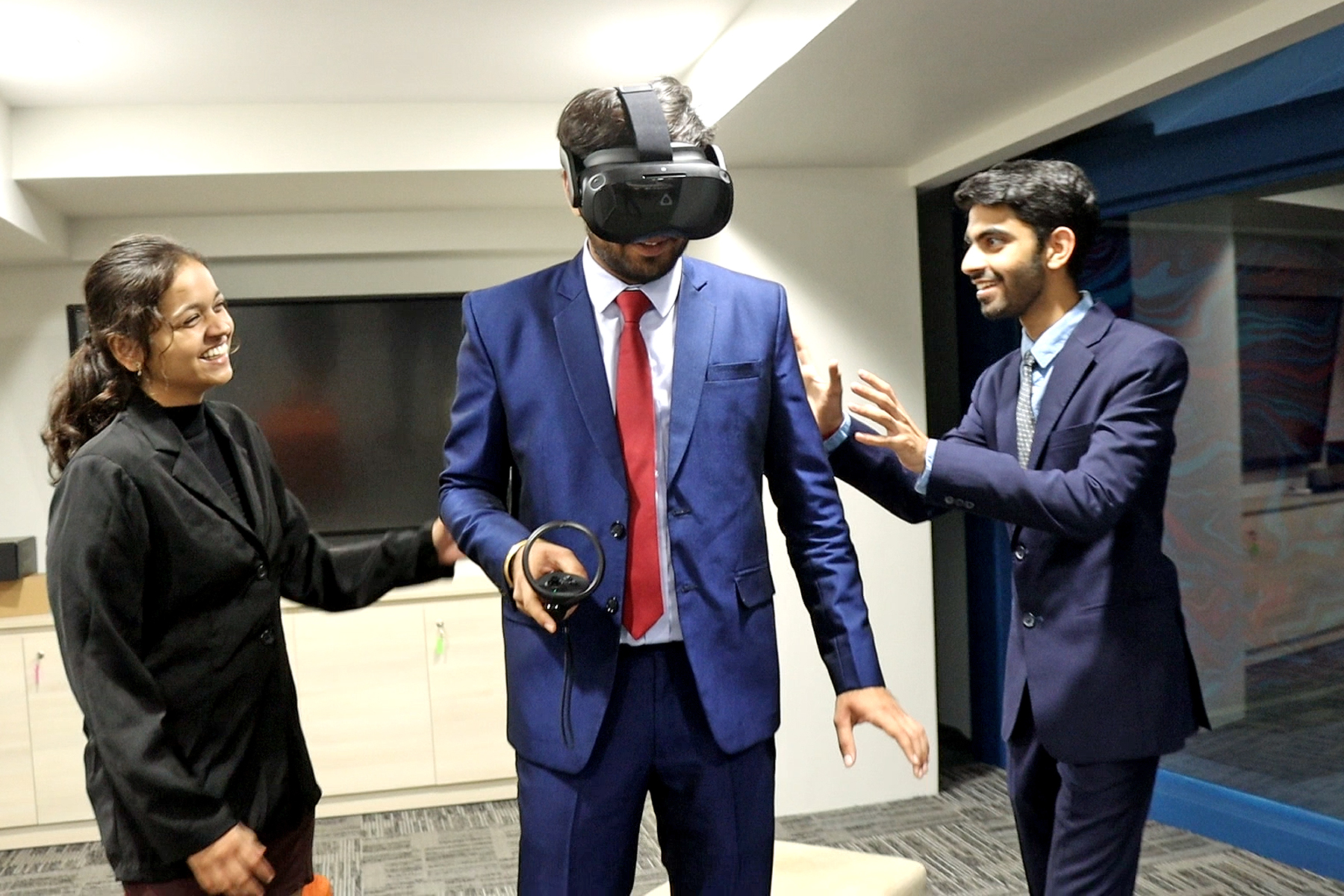
AI Experience at Universal AI University

The university offers undergraduate, postgraduate and doctoral degree programs under its constituent schools of AI and future technologies, liberal arts and humanities, design, and the Universal Business School. The university also delivers Bachelor of Business Administration and Master of Business Administration courses for Cardiff Metropolitan University, UK. The university has established a lab to learn and experiment with Augmented Reality, Mixed Reality, IoT, Blockchain. It has devised a curriculum which has practical experiential learning embedded in every course.

=== Affiliations and accreditations ===
Universal AI University postgraduate diploma and fellowship courses are accredited by the All India Council for Technical Education. Universal AI University is recognised by the University Grants Commission. It is also a member of Association of Indian Universities.

==== UAi School of Management ====
UAi School of Management was founded and setup in 2011 in Karjat and is spread across 40 acres. UAi-SoM became the first business school approved by AICTE. It is also known as India's first Green B-School with over 7000 trees in the campus and 40 percent of the campus with no construction. It is also the first b-school to publish its ESG report. It offers undergraduate and post graduate programmes in BBA, BBA+MBA, MBA and Executive MBA. It has also deployed green curriculum to inculcate ´green thinking´ in students with pioneering courses like Green Finance, Green Marketing, and Green Operations and Logistics.

==== School of Ai and Future Technologies ====
In 2012 UBS also established an Incubation Center and an Artificial Intelligence, Emerging & Foundational Technologies (AIEFT) Innovation Hub in Karjat through a joint venture with the Vitti Foundation. This initiative facilitated a strategic shift in Universal Business School's focus toward artificial intelligence (AI), culminating in its transformation into Universal AI University and its School of AI and Future technologies. It offers courses in BTech Computer Science in AI & ML and BTech Computer Science in Data Science.

==== School of Music, Sounds and Cinematics ====
In March 2024, Universal AI University and SoundideaZ Academy also Launched first AI - embedded Sound and Music Degree, a four-year B.Tech. in Sound Engineering and a three-year B.A. in Audio and Music production under its School of Music, Sounds and Cinematics.

Liberal Arts & Humanities School

The liberal arts & Humanities School at Universal AI University offers AI-based programs in BA (Hons.) Economics BA (Hons.) Psychology. From January 2010 to January 2020, the department conducted the 'Red Dot' experiment, which aimed to illustrate the influence of culture on visual communication.

Design School

The Design School at Universal AI University offers B Des in Fashion Design, Product Design, Animation and Graphic Design. Rubika Design School, a well-known institution for design education, has partnered with Universal AI University, India's first AI-based university The partnership between Rubika Design School and Universal AI University will deliver comprehensive programs, including a four-year Bachelor of Design (B. Des.) and an integrated five-year Master of Design (M. Des.). These programs will specialize in Transportation Design, Product Design, UX/UI Design, Animation, Video Game Art, and Video Game Design. In subsequent years, offerings will expand to include Digital Design, Interaction Design, and Tech-art.

== Metaverse and AI-based Admission Process ==
The Universal AI University has implemented a novel admissions process, leveraging the Metaverse and Artificial Intelligence (AI) technologies. This system integrates optimization algorithms, crowd-generating tools, and visual enhancement technologies within the Metaverse. Students select avatars to represent their digital presence during the process.

A virtual companion, known as Droid, assists candidates throughout the admissions journey. This includes accompanying them to test rooms, administering assessments, and delivering prompt results. Droid also facilitates virtual interviews, which are subsequently reviewed by the university administration and communicated to the candidates via email or verbal delivery by Droid itself. The ability for candidates to schedule their interview slots marks a significant shift towards a more streamlined and potentially human-less admissions process.

== MOUs and Partnerships and Partnerships ==
In May 2025, India's Universal AI University and Qatar's Arab Center for Artificial Intelligence signed a memorandum of understanding to advance collaborative efforts in the field of artificial intelligence. The agreement outlines the establishment of an AI research center in Doha and the introduction of specialized training programs aimed at addressing the rising demand for AI expertise. Additionally, the partnership includes plans to develop an interdisciplinary campus that will focus on areas such as engineering, business administration, environmental sustainability, and emerging technologies. This development is viewed as part of broader regional efforts to expand educational and research capacities in the rapidly evolving AI sector.

Florida State University's Jim Moran College of Entrepreneurship (JMC) and Universal AI University (UAi) in India announced a strategic partnership in July 2025 focused on the intersection of artificial intelligence and entrepreneurship. The collaboration aims to promote research and education, particularly in areas such as poverty alleviation and family business development. JMC will be a founding member of UAi's Center for AI and Entrepreneurship. As part of the initiative, both institutions will co-host a quarterly webinar series open to global participants.

== Campus and student life ==
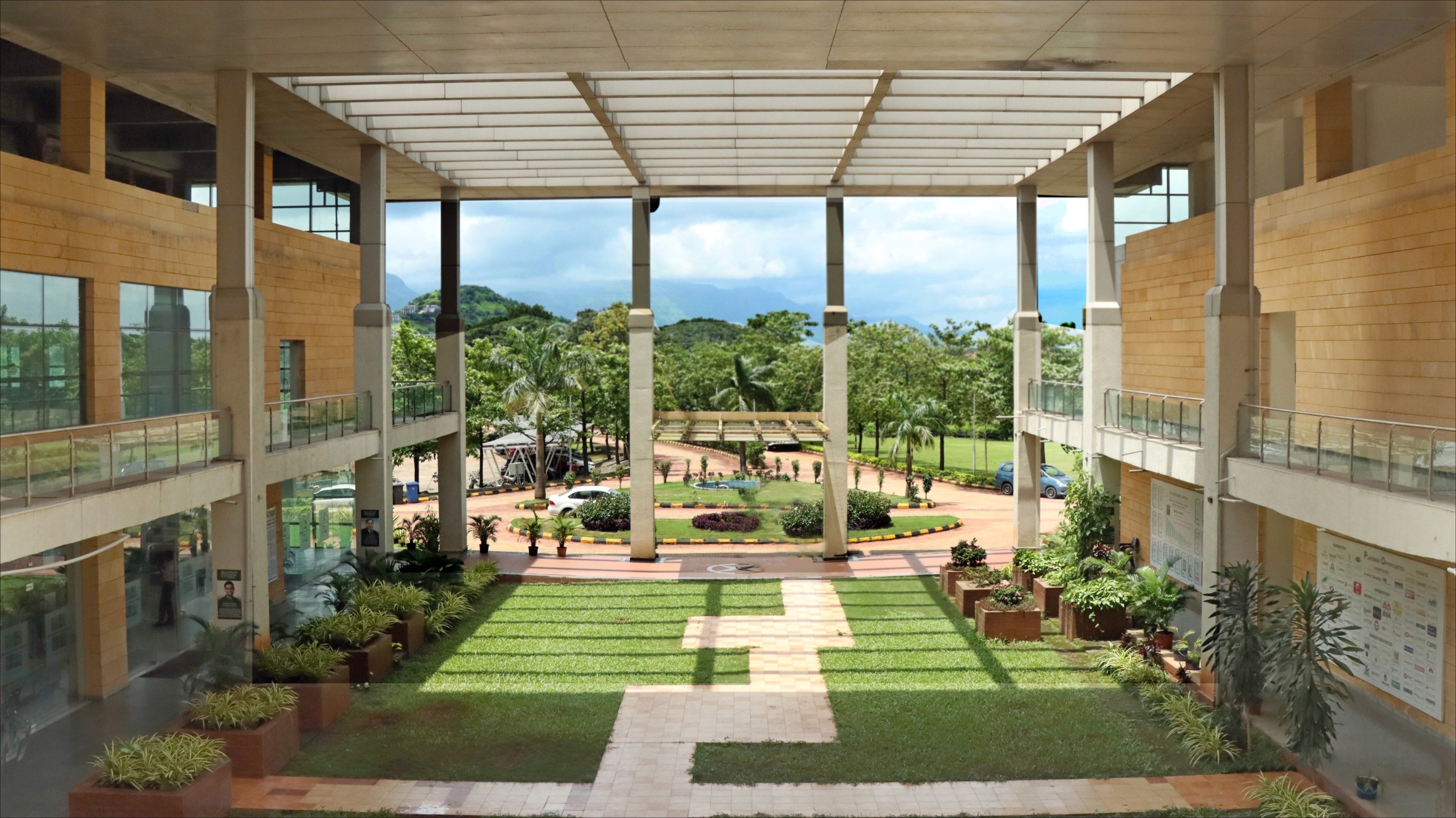
Campus Courtyard at Universal AI University

The Universal AI University campus covers 40 acres (16 ha) in Karjat, Mumbai, with over 10,000 trees. Sports facilities on campus include a football ground. The campus employs solar electricity for 50% of its electricity needs enabling it to have a sustainable and positive impact on the environment. In 2023, UAi - School of Management has about 21% students enrolled from the Eastern parts of India and recorded 1,230 interview from 229 companies for its MBA students from domestic and international companies. The university has admitted students from 26 states and union territories in India and has received applications from countries including the United Kingdom, Nepal, Indonesia and nations in Africa and the Gulf.
