= Rustomjee Academy for Global Careers =

Vocational education institute in India

- Type: Private Vocational Education Institute
- Established: 2008
- Affiliations: Maharashtra State Board of Vocational Education Examination, Yashwantrao Chavan Maharashtra Open University, University of Wolverhampton, Pearson
- Location: Mumbai, Maharashtra, India
- Campus: Urban, rural
- Website: www.ragc.in

Rustomjee Academy for Global Careers is a private vocational education and training (VET) institute. The institute is located on four campuses across Dahanu, Thane, Bengaluru and Rishikesh in India. It was established in 2008.

== History ==
Rustomjee Academy for Global Careers was established in 2008 as a corporate social responsibility initiative of the Rustomjee Group, a real estate developer in Mumbai. Since its inception, RAGC has trained over 100,000 students.

== Accreditation and partnerships ==
Rustomjee Academy for Global Careers is affiliated with Maharashtra State Board of Vocational Education Examination, Yashwantrao Chavan Maharashtra Open University, University of Wolverhampton and Pearson. The institute has also partnered with the National Skill Development Corporation.

== Campus ==
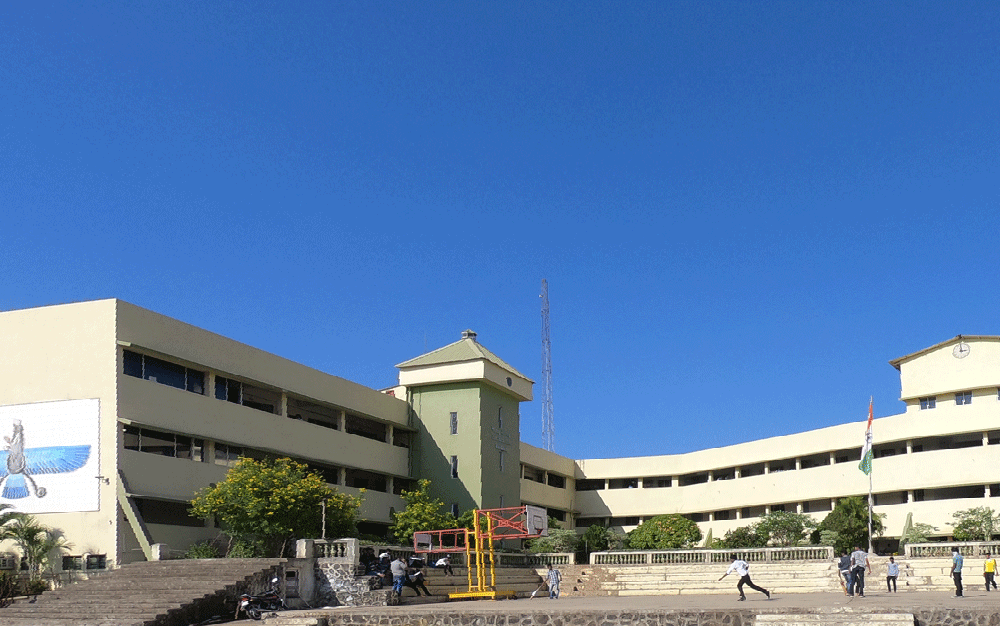
Rustomjee Academy for Global Careers

RAGC Dahanu: It was started in 2012 and affiliated to Maharashtra State Board of Vocational Education Examination (MSBVEE) in 2013. The campus is expanded in 5 acres located in Dahanu East. It offers full-time / part time programs in automobile, electronics, business, construction, and hospitality management.

RAGC Thane: Founded in 2014, Thane campus of RAGC is located in the industrial zone of Wagle Estate. It offers Full-Time Programs in Automobile, Electrical, Construction, and Business and offers Part-Time Programs in Multi-Skill Technician – ELBS, Construction Site Supervisor, and Automotive Mechanic.

RAGC Bengaluru: Rustomjee Academy for Global Careers partnered with Prestige Group, as a part of Skill India Mission, to set up the Rustomjee Prestige Vocational Education and Training Centre in Bengaluru, in 2017. The campus offers corporate training to employees in Mechanical and Electrical sector. It also offers higher national diploma in construction and the built environment accredited by Pearson.

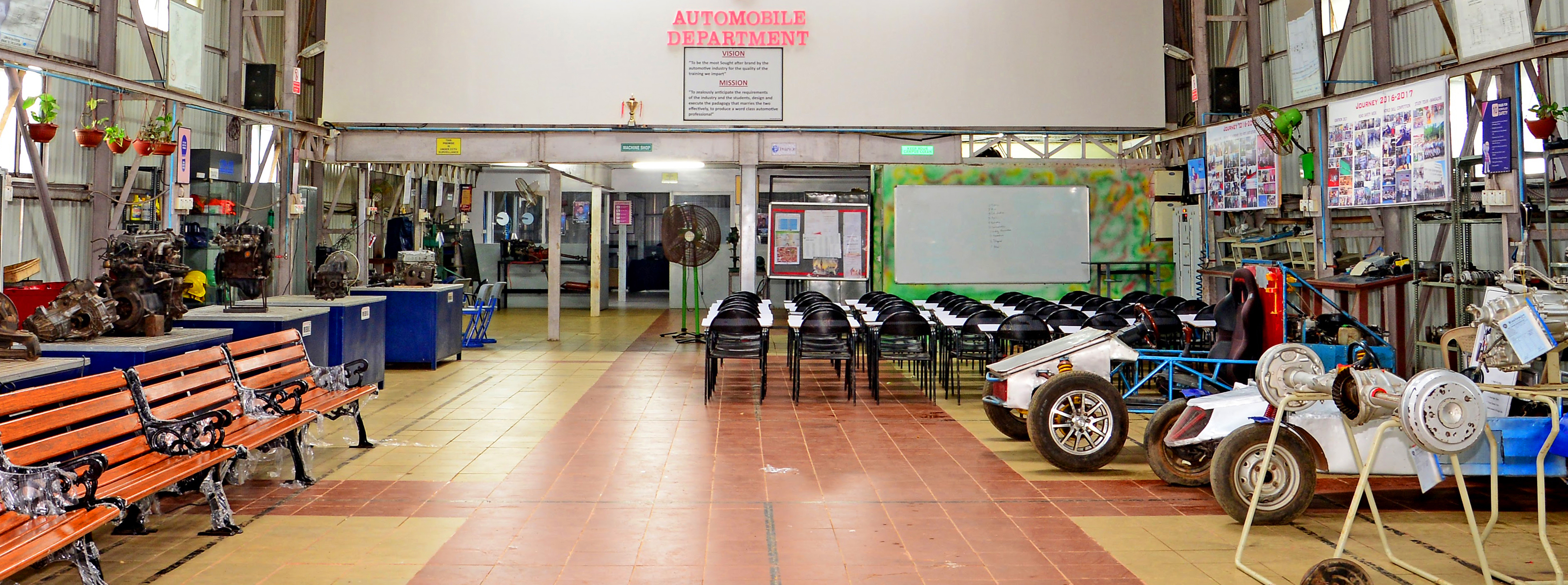
Automobile Laboratory at Rustomjee Academy for Global Careers, Dahanu

RAGC Rishikesh: RAGC partnered with Shri. Swami Purnanand Vidya Niketan Samiti to start a centre in Rishikesh in 2018. It offers short term vocational training courses for Pastry Chef and Multi Skilled Technician.

== Academic departments ==
The institute has 4 academic departments offering certificate, diploma and degree programs. These are:

- Automobile Engineering Department
- Civil and Construction engineering Department
- Electronics and Tele-Communication Engineering Department
- Management & Entrepreneurship Department

== Leadership ==
- Boman Rustom Irani, Chairman and managing director of Rustomjee Group
- Percy Chowdhry, Director of Rustomjee Group

== Awards and recognition ==
- Best Vocational Training Provider at UK-India Skills Forum Awards 2010 by FICCI and UK India Business Council
- Excellence in Skill Development, CREDAI Conclave 2017–18
- Finalists in The Times of India Social Impact Awards, 2011
- Best Training Partner – RPL by Tourism and Hospitality Skill Council

== Impact ==
=== Social ===
Skill Cluster, a division of Rustomjee Academy for Global Careers was started in 2015 with an aim to take the benefit of vocational skills to the masses for immediate employment. Skill Cluster has been supported by National Skill Development Corporation, Maharashtra State Skill Development Society, Uttarakhand Skill Development Mission, Tourism Corporation of Gujarat Limited and Confederation of Real Estate Developers Association of India.

=== Corporate ===
Rustomjee Academy for Global Careers Corporate Training Program was introduced to support industry members by providing gainful skill training to their existing/new employees.
