= Siddharth College of Arts, Science and Commerce =

College in Mumbai

Siddharth College
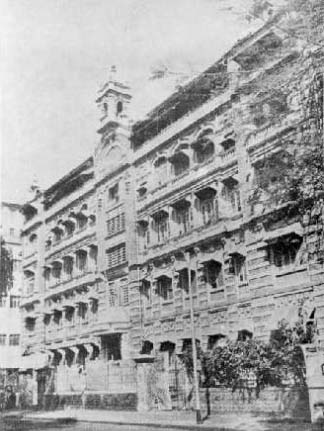
- Building of Dr. Ambedkar's Siddhartha College, Mumbai in 1956
- Established: June 20, 1946; 80 years ago
- Academic affiliations: University of Mumbai
- Location: Buddha Bhavan, Purshotamdas Thakurdas Marg, Outram Road, Fort, Mumbai, Maharashtra, 400001, India; 18°55′51.5″N 72°49′50.2″E
- Campus: Urban
- Website: siddharthcollegeofasc.com

Siddharth College of Arts, Science and Commerce is a college in Mumbai offering undergraduate and postgraduate courses in Arts, Science, and Commerce fields. The college is affiliated with the University of Mumbai.

== History ==
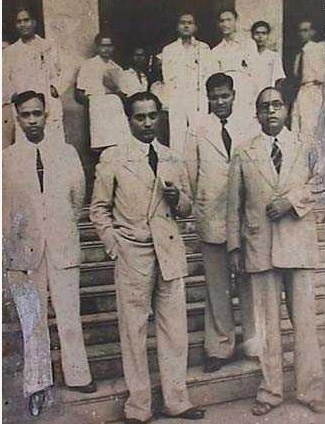
Babasaheb Ambedkar with Homi J. Bhabha and other colleagues at Siddharth College, 1946

It was founded on 20 June 1946 by the People's Education Society which was formed by B. R. Ambedkar. It was the first educational institution by the nascent society which was founded nearly a year ago on 8 July 1945 with an aim of affording legal education to all sections of society. The commerce courses became available in 1980.

It is housed in Buddha Bhavan, situated in the Fort area of Mumbai. Its office is located in Anand Bhavan, which has been declared as a heritage structure by the Heritage society of the MMRDA. The building is susceptible to flooding in heavy Mumbai monsoon.

Over the years, Bharipa's Prakash Ambedkar (Babasaheb's grandson) and Republican Party's Ramdas Athawale – both Ambedkarite factions, but with differing perspectives on socio-political issues – have fought for control over the society and the college.

== Courses offered ==
As of 2022, the college offered undergraduate coursework in Arts, Science and Commerce Streams. The college also enrolls graduate students in M.Sc. & Ph.D. programs.

== Library ==
The college is also home to some rare books from Dr. Ambedkar's personal collection, which were used as reference for drafting the Constitution of India. The library has on display many Ambedkar artifacts, including a copy of the Constitution of India with his name embossed on it.

== Notable alumni ==
- Sulabha Deshpande
- Jeetendra
- Libia Lobo Sardesai
- Vijay Patkar
- José Pereira (scholar)
- Lalan Sarang
- Dilip Sardesai
- Padmakar Shivalkar
- Naren Tamhane

== See also ==
- Siddharth College of Law, Mumbai
