= Ramniranjan Jhunjhunwala College of Arts, Science & Commerce =

College in Mumbai, India

Ramniranjan Jhunjhunwala College (Autonomous)
- Motto: Knowledge is all Ambrosia
- Type: Education and research institution
- Established: 15 August 1938
- Founder: Shree Nandikishore Singh Jairamji
- Affiliations: NAAC
- Principal: Dr. Himanshu Dawda
- Location: Ghatkopar, Mumbai, India
- Campus: Urban
- Website: rjcollege.edu.in

Ramniranjan Jhunjhunwala College (Autonomous) is college located in Ghatkopar (W), Mumbai, India. It is affiliated to University of Mumbai It was established in 1963.

== Reward ==
It has been awarded and rated "A" grade by the NAAC with CGPA 3.50 and has been awarded "Best College" of Mumbai University in 2009 and ISO 9001:2008 Associated in 2010 rather than that it has been Awarded ISO 14001:2004 in 2013 and has achieved Jagar Janivancha Award by Maharashtra Government 2013–14.

The college has been granted "Autonomous Status" by University Grants Commission (UGC) for a period of ten years w.e.f. 2018–2019 to 2027-2028 (Letter No. F. 22-1/2018(AC) dated 28 May 2018). However, the college remains affiliated to University of Mumbai with an autonomous status.
