= Legal education in India =

Legal education in India generally refers to the education of lawyers before entry into practice. Legal education in India is offered at different levels by the traditional universities and the specialised law universities and schools only after completion of an undergraduate degree or as an integrated degree.

Legal Education in India is regulated by the Bar Council of India, a statutory body established under the section 4 of Advocates Act 1961. Any institution imparting legal education in India must be approved by the Bar Council of India.

== History ==
India has a recorded legal history starting from the Vedic ages and some sort of civil law system may have been in place during the Bronze Age and the Indus Valley civilization. Law as a matter of religious prescriptions and philosophical discourse has an illustrious history in India. Emanating from the Vedas, the Upanishads, and other religious texts, it was a fertile field enriched by practitioners from different Hindu philosophical schools and later by Jains and Buddhists. Secular law in India varied widely from region to region and from ruler to ruler. Court systems for civil and criminal matters were essential features of many ruling dynasties of ancient India. Excellent Vedic court systems existed under the Mauryas (321-185 BCE) with epics like Arthashastra defining law and Manusmriti defining royal duties. After the shift from the Mughal legal system, the advocates under that regimen, “vakils”, too followed suit, though they mostly continued their earlier roles as client representatives. The doors of the newly created Supreme Courts were barred to Indian practitioners as the right of audience was limited to members of English, Irish, and Scottish professional bodies. Subsequent rules and statutes culminated in the Legal Practitioners Act of 1846 which opened up the profession regardless of nationality or religion.

The formal institutionalisation of legal education in India began soon after. In 1855, the Government Law School was founded in Bombay on public demand under the leadership of Jagannath Shankarseth, growing out of the Perry Professorship of Jurisprudence established at the Elphinstone Institution in 1852. Later renamed Government Law College (and now Government Law College, Mumbai), it is recognised as the oldest law school in Asia, predating both the University of Bombay (established 1857) and the Bombay High Court itself.

In India, legal education has been traditionally offered as a three-year graduate degree. However, the structure has been changed since 1987. Law degrees in India are granted and conferred in terms of the Advocates Act, 1961, which is a law passed by the Parliament both on the aspect of legal education and also the regulation of the conduct of the legal profession. Under the Act, the Bar Council of India is the supreme regulatory body to regulate the legal profession in India and also to ensure the compliance of the laws and maintenance of professional standards by the legal profession in the country.

To this regard, the Bar Council of India prescribes the minimum curriculum required to be taught for an institution to be eligible for the grant of a law degree. The Bar Council also carries on a period of supervision of the institutions conferring the degree and evaluates their teaching methodology and curriculum and having determined that the institution meets the required standards, recognizes the institution and the degree conferred by it.

Traditionally the degrees that were conferred carried the title of LL.B. (Bachelor of Laws) or B.L. (Bachelor of Law). The eligibility requirement for these degrees was that the applicant already have a Bachelor's degree in any subject from a recognized institution. Thereafter the LL.B. / B.L. course was for three years, upon the successful completion of which the applicant was granted either degree.

However upon the suggestion by the Law Commission of India and also given the prevailing cry for reform the Bar Council of India instituted an experiment in terms of establishing specialized law universities solely devoted to legal education and thus to raise the academic standards of the legal profession in India. This decision was taken somewhere in 1985 and thereafter the first law University in India was set up in Bangalore which was named the National Law School of India University (popularly 'NLS'). These law universities were meant to offer a multi-disciplinary and integrated approach to legal education. It was therefore for the first time that a law degree other than LL.B. or B.L. was granted in India. NLS offered a five-year law course upon the successful completion of which an integrated degree with the title of "B.A., LL.B. (Honours)" would be granted.

Thereafter other law universities were set up, all offering five years integrated law degrees with different nomenclature. The next in line was National Law Institute University set up in Bhopal in 1997. It was followed by NALSAR University of Law set up in 1998. The National Law University, Jodhpur offered for the first time in 2001 the integrated law degree of "B.B.A, LL.B. (Honours)" which was preceded by the West Bengal National University of Juridical Sciences offering the "B.Sc., LL.B. (Honours)" degree. Gujarat National Law University, Gandhinagar became the first law school in India in 2003 to start integrated law in five different streams and specializations; i.e. BA/B.Com./BBA/B.Sc./BSW LLB (Honours).

However, despite these specialized law universities, the traditional three-year degree continues to be offered in India by other institutions. It is equally recognized as an eligible qualification for practicing law in India. Another essential difference that remains is that while the eligibility qualification for the three-year law degree is that the applicant must already be a holder of a Bachelor's degree, to be eligible for the five-year integrated law degree, the applicant must have completed Class XII from a recognized Boards of Education in India.

Both the holders of the three-year degree and the five-year integrated degree are eligible for enrollment with the Bar Council of India upon the fulfillment of eligibility conditions and upon enrollment, may appear before any court in India.

The University Grants Commission approved one-year LLM courses in India on 6 September 2012 and the guideline for the same was notified in January 2013.“We have an immense problem with the faculty, especially with more than 900 plus law schools all over the country, we suffer for want of faculty. The curriculum needs to be regulated and we will have to gradually upscale and upgrade,” confessed erstwhile law minister, Veerappa Moily.

== Academic degrees ==
In India, a student can pursue a legal course only after completing an undergraduate course in any discipline. However, following the national law school model, one can study law as an integrated course of five years after passing the senior secondary examination.

- Bachelor of Laws (LL.B.) - The LL.B. is the most common law degree offered and conferred by Indian universities which has a duration of three years. Almost all law universities follow a standard LL.B. curriculum, wherein students are exposed to the required bar subjects.
- Integrated undergraduate degrees - B.A. LL.B., B.Sc. LL.B., BBA. LLB., B.Com. LL.B., B.A.L. LL.B These degrees are mostly offered in the autonomous law schools having a duration of five years.
- Master of Laws (LL.M.) - The LL.M. is most common postgraduate law degree which has a duration of one/two years.
- Master of Business Law
- Doctor of Philosophy (Ph.D.)
- Integrated MBL-LLM/ MBA-LLM. -Generally a three years double degree integrated course with specialisation in business law.

== Admission ==
As of 2012, admission to LLB and LLM in most of the autonomous law schools in India is based on performance in Common Law Admission Test (CLAT). However, the National Law University, Delhi and the private autonomous law schools conduct their own admission tests. The other entrance exams available for admission to law courses in India include AILET, LSAT, JMI Entrance, JMIBVP CET and IPU, AUAT and AMU Law entrance exams among others.

In most of the traditional universities, the admission is done on the basis of an admission test to the constituent law college or a common admission test for its affiliated colleges. Some traditional universities and affiliated colleges also admits students on the basis of merit in the preceding examination.

Wiki

- List of law schools in India
- Institute of Legal Education (ILE - Online Law School)
