= N. L. Dalmia Institute of Management Studies and Research =

Educational institute in Mumbai, India

Coordinates: 19.2691°N 72.8710°E

N. L. Dalmia Institute of Management Studies and Research (NLDIMSR)
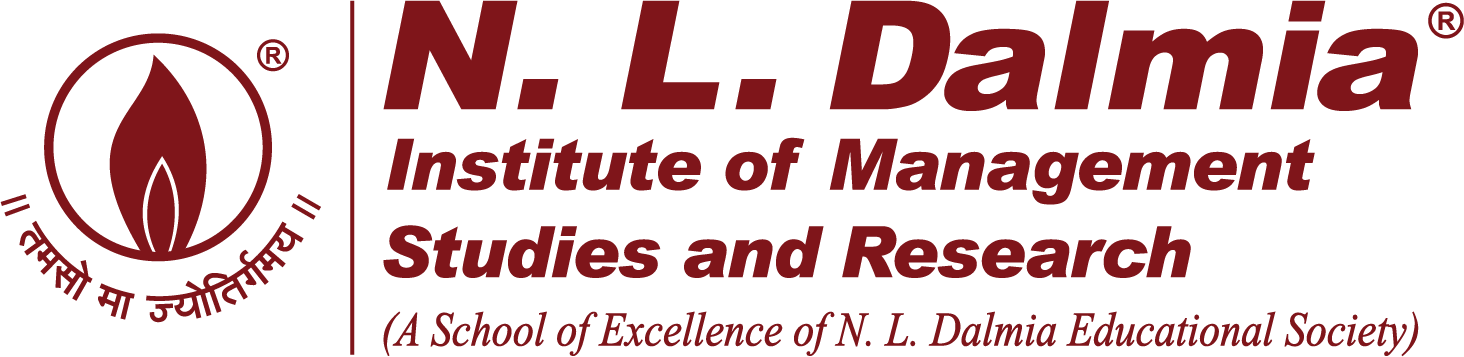
- NLDIMSR Logo
- Motto: तमसो मा ज्योतिर्गमय
- Motto in English: From darkness lead me to light
- Type: Education and Research Institution
- Established: 1995
- Founder: Late Shri Niranjanlalji Dalmia
- Chairman: Shri Shivkumar Dalmia
- Director: Prof. Dr. Seema Saini
- Location: Mira Road, Maharashtra, India
- Campus: Urban
- Website: www.nldalmia.in

N. L. Dalmia Institute of Management Studies and Research (NLDIMSR) is a business school situated in Mira Road, Mumbai, Maharashtra. It was formed under the aegis of the N. L. Dalmia Educational Society, founded by Shri Niranjanlal Dalmia.

Established in 1995, N. L. Dalmia commenced its academic programme in July 1997, offering a two-year full-time course affiliated to the University of Mumbai, the Post Graduate Diploma (PGDM) in Business Management, a three-year part-time course approved by AICTE which is available in both full-time and part-time presentations. The Institute provides specialisation in areas such as Finance, Marketing, Human Resources, and Business Analytics, and special extra credit courses including Financial Markets & Investments, Wealth Management, Enterprise Resource Planning (ERP), and Software Engineering. From 2020 onwards, the college has decided to take admissions only for Post Graduate Diploma in Business Management for a two-year full-time course.

N. L. Dalmia Institute of Management Studies and Research has set up a Bloomberg Finance Lab with 12 Bloomberg Terminals. By bringing the Bloomberg Professional Service to campus. and Mumbai's first institution to have such world class infrastructure.

== Rankings ==
- Ranked amongst India's Top 25 B-Schools in Times Bschool Survey
- Ranked amongst India's TOP 50 B-Schools in CNBC TV18's 2013 Survey
- Ranked Amongst India's TOP 30 B-School by ZEE BUSINESS NEWS Channel – Nov 2009

== Courses ==
• Post Graduate Diploma in Finance
• Post Graduate Diploma in Marketing
• Post Graduate Diploma in HR
• Post Graduate Diploma in Business Analytics
• PhD in Management
• Global MBA Program
