= List of educational institutions in Mumbai =

The following is a list of notable educational institutions in Mumbai.

== Universities ==
- Amity University, Mumbai
- Dr. Homi Bhabha State University, Mumbai
- IIT Bombay
- Maharashtra National Law University, Mumbai
- Pillai University
- SNDT Women's University
- Somaiya Vidyavihar University
- SVKM's NMIMS (Narsee Monjee Institute of Management Studies)
- Universal AI University
- University of Mumbai

== Degree colleges ==
=== Applied arts and architecture ===
- L S Raheja School of Architecture, Bandra
- Sir J. J. College of Architecture, Fort

=== Commerce, science and arts ===
- Chetana College, Bandra
- D. G. Ruparel College of Arts, Science and Commerce, Matunga
- Elphinstone College, Fort
- Guru Nanak Khalsa College of Arts, Science & Commerce, Matunga
- H. R. College of Commerce and Economics, Churchgate
- Institute of Forensic Science, Mumbai, Fort
- Jai Hind College, Churchgate
- Kirti M. Doongursee College, Dadar West
- Kishinchand Chellaram College (K. C. College), Churchgate
- Malini Kishor Sanghvi College of Commerce & Economics, Vile Parle
- Mithibai College, Vile Parle
- Narsee Monjee College of Commerce and Economics, Vile Parle
- R. D. National College, Bandra
- Ramnarain Ruia College, Matunga
- Ramniranjan Anandilal Podar College of Commerce and Economics, Matunga
- Ramniranjan Jhunjhunwala College of Arts, Science & Commerce, Ghatkopar West
- Royal College of Science, Arts and Commerce, Mira Road
- SIES College of Arts, Science & Commerce, Sion West
- SIES College of Commerce and Economics, Sion East
- Somaiya Vidyavihar, Vidyavihar East
- Sophia College for Women, Sion East
- South Indians' Welfare Society College, Wadala
- St. Xavier's College, Dhobitalao
- Sydenham College of Commerce and Economics, Churchgate
- V. G. Vaze College of Arts, Science and Commerce, (formerly Kelkar College), Mulund East
- Wilson College, Girgaon

== Medical schools ==
- Grant Medical College and Sir JJ Group of Hospitals
- Hinduhridaysamrat Balasaheb Thackeray Medical College and Dr. R. N. Cooper Municipal General Hospital
- K. J. Somaiya Medical College & Research Centre
- Lokmanya Tilak Municipal Medical College and General Hospital
- Seth G.S. Medical College and King Edward Memorial Hospital
- Topiwala National Medical College and BYL Nair Charitable Hospital

== Engineering schools ==
- Datta Meghe College of Engineering
- Fr. Conceicao Rodrigues Institute of Technology
- IIT Bombay
- Institute of Chemical Technology
- K. J. Somaiya College of Engineering
- K. J. Somaiya Institute of Technology
- Lokmanya Tilak College of Engineering
- M. H. Saboo Siddik College of Engineering
- Mukesh Patel School of Technology Management & Engineering
- Padmabhushan Vasantdada Patil Pratishthan's College of Engineering
- Pillai College of Engineering (Autonomous)
- Rajiv Gandhi Institute of Technology
- Rustomjee Academy for Global Careers
- St. Francis Institute of Technology
- Sardar Patel College of Engineering
- Sardar Patel Institute of Technology
- Shah & Anchor Kutchhi Engineering College
- SVPKM's Bhagubhai Mafatlal Polytechnic & College of Engineering
- SIES Graduate School of Technology
- Thadomal Shahani Engineering College
- Thakur College of Engineering and Technology
- Usha Mittal Institute of Technology
- Veermata Jijabai Technological Institute
- Vidyalankar Institute of Technology
- Vivekanand Education Society's Institute of Technology
- Xavier Institute of Engineering

== Law Schools ==
- G. J. Advani Law College, Bandra
- Government Law College, Churchgate
- K C Law College, Churchgate
- Maharashtra National Law University, Mumbai
- School of Law, University of Mumbai, Mumbai
- Siddharth College of Law, Anand Bhavan, Fort

== Schools ==
- Adarsha Vidyalaya, Chembur
- Al Barkaat Malik Muhammad Islam English School, Kurla
- Alexandra Girls' English Institution
- American School of Bombay
- Ascend International School, Bandra
- Bombay Scottish School, Mahim
- Bombay Scottish School, Powai
- Campion School, Fort
- Cathedral and John Connon School, Fort
- Children's Academy, Ashok Nagar/Kandivali/Malad
- Christ Church School
- CP Goenka International School
- Dhirubhai Ambani International School, Bandra East
- Don Bosco High School, Matunga
- Dr. Antonio Da Silva High School and Junior College of Commerce, Dadar
- Dr. Pillai Global Academy, New Panvel
- E.E.E. Sassoon High School
- École Mondiale World School, Juhu
- Edubridge International School
- Fort Convent School, Fort
- Girton High School
- Hansraj Morarji Public School
- Holy Cross High School, Kurla
- Holy Family High School, Andheri
- Inodai Waldorf School, Andheri East
- Islamic International School
- Jamnabai Narsee School, Juhu
- Japanese School of Mumbai, Powai
- J.B. Petit High School for Girls, Fort
- JBCN International School, Borivali/Chembur/Mulund/Oshiwara/Parel
- Kendriya Vidyalaya, IIT Powai
- Lilavatibai Podar High School, Khar
- Lycée Français International de Mumbai, Parel
- MKVV International Vidyalaya, Borivali
- Mount Litera School International, Bandra
- Michael High School, Kurla
- NES International School, Mulund
- Oberoi International School, Jogeshwari/Oberoi Garden City
- Our Lady of Perpetual Succour High School, Chembur
- Parle Tilak Vidyalaya Marathi Medium Secondary School, Vile Parle
- Parle Tilak Vidyalaya English Medium School, Vile Parle
- Podar International School
- Queen Mary School
- R. N. Podar School, Santacruz
- Raja Shivaji Vidyalaya, Dadar
- Rajhans Vidyalaya, Anderi
- Sacred Heart Boys High School, Santacruz
- Saint Francis D'Assisi High School, I.C. Colony
- Sheth Gopalji Hemraj High School, Borivali
- Singapore International School, Dahisar
- Sir Elly Kadoorie High School, Mazgaon
- South Indian Education Society High School, Matunga
- St. Agnes High School, Byculla
- St. Andrew's High School, Bandra
- St. Anne's High School, Fort
- St. Gregorios High School, Chembur
- St. Mary's High School SSC, Mazgaon
- St. Mary's School ISC, Mazgaon
- St. Peter's School, Mazgaon
- St. Sebastian Goan High School
- St. Stanislaus High School, Bandra
- St. Teresa's High School, Charni Road
- St. Xavier's Boys' Academy, Marine Lines
- St. Xavier's High School, Fort
- St. Xavier's High School, Vile Parle West
- Udayachal High School, Vikhroli
- The Universal School
- Utpal Shanghvi Global School, Juhu
- Walsingham House School

== Miscellany ==
- Bhabha Atomic Research Centre (BARC)
- D. G. Ruparel College of Arts, Science and Commerce
- Jamnalal Bajaj Institute of Management Studies (JBIMS)
- Nehru Planetarium
- Nehru Science Centre
- National Institute of Industrial Engineering (NITIE)
- NMIMS Narsee Monjee Institute of Management Studies
- Ramnarain Ruia College
- Ramniranjan Anandilal Podar College of Commerce and Economics
- SNDT Women's University
- SP Jain Institute of Management and Research
- St. Xavier's College, Mumbai
- Tata Institute of Fundamental Research (TIFR)
- Tata Institute of Social Sciences (TISS)
