= List of schools and colleges in Andheri =

List of educational institutions in Andheri, Mumbai, India

The following is a list of schools and colleges in Andheri, Mumbai, India:

== Municipal ==
=== Andheri East municipal schools ===
They include:

Dr. S. Radhakrishnan Marg Marathi School, Dr. S. Radhakrishnan Marg U.P. Hindi School, Dr. S. Radhakrishnan Marg Gujarati School, and Dr. S. Radhakrishnan Marg L.P. Hindi School

Gundawali Mun. School - Gundawali U.P. Marathi School and Gundawali U.P. Hindi School

Rajashri Shahu Maharaj Mun. Marathi School and Rajashri Shahu Maharaj Mun. Urdu School

Nityanand Marg, Mun. Marathi School, Nityanand Marg, Mun. Hindi School, Nityanand Marg, Mun. Kannada School, Nityanand Marg, Mun. Telugu School, and Nityanand Marg, Mun. School

Sambhaji Nagar Mun. Marathi School, Sagbaug Mun. Marathi Primary School, Sagbaug Mun. U.P. Urdu School, Sagbaug Mun. Hindi School, and Sagbaug Mun. L.P. Urdu School

Chakala Mun. School Bldg. - Chakala Mun. Marathi School No 1, Chakala Mun. Marathi School No 2, Chakala Mun. Hindi School, Chakala Mun. Kannad School, Chakala Mun. Urdu School, Chakala Mun. Gujarathi School, and Chakala Mun. Telugu School

Mogra (E) Mun. Marathi School and Marol Mun. Hindi School No 2

Dr. Sarvapali Radhakrishnan L.P. Marathi School

Mogra Pada Urdu School

Malpa Dongri Marathi School and Baptiswadi Mun Kannad School

Marol Police Camp. Marathi School

=== Andheri West municipal schools ===
They include:

Andheri (W) Mun. Sch. Bldg - Andheri (W) Urdu School No 1, Andheri (W) Marathi School No 1, Andheri (W) Marathi School No 2, Andheri (W) Hindi School, and Andheri (W) Gujarathi School

Kama Road Mun Sch. Bldg. - Kama Road Urdu School No 1, Kama Road Urdu School No 2, Kama Road Urdu School No 3, Kama Road Hindi School, and Kama Road English School

D.N. Nagar Mun. Sch. Bldg - D.N. Nagar Marathi School No 1, D.N. Nagar Marathi School No 2, D.N. Nagar Tamil School, D.N. Nagar Telugu School, D.N. Nagar Kannad School, D.N. Nagar Hindi School, D.N. Nagar Urdu School, D.N. Nagar Gujarathi School

Gillbert Hill Mun. Sch. Bldg - Gillbert Hill Urdu School No 1, Gillbert Hill Urdu School No 2, Gillbert Hill Kannad School, and Gillbert Hill Telugu School

== Private Schools ==
=== Andheri East private schools ===
- Divine Child High School Andheri (East)
- Holy Family High School Andheri (East)

Bombay Cambridge International School Andheri (East)

- Canossa Convent High School
- Canossa Convent Primary School
- Saint Arnold's High School
- St. Dominic Savio High School, Andheri
- Narayana e-Techno School, Marol, Andheri (East)
- The Little Flower's High School and College
- The Little Buds International Pre-School
- Hasanat High School

=== Andheri West private schools ===
Hansraj Morarji Public School

Bombay Cambridge International School Andheri (West)

Bhavan's A. H. Wadia High School

Jankidevi Public School

- Rajhans Vidyalaya

RIMS International School

Ryan Global School

- St. Blaise High School
- S C D Barfiwala High School, D N Nagar
- Angel Land High School (formerly Agnel Land High School)
- City International School
- Marble Arch School
- St. Louis Convent High School
- St. Xavier's High School
- Prime Academy

== Colleges ==
=== Andheri East colleges ===
- Oriental College of Commerce and Management (OCCM)
- Tolani College of Commerce
- Begum Jamila Haji Abdul Haq College
- Kamla Raheja Junior College

=== Andheri West colleges ===
- Bhavan College (Bharatiya Vidya Bhavan's M. M. College Of Arts, N. M. Institute Of Science, H. R. J. College Of Commerce)
- Sardar Patel College of Engineering (SPCE)
- M. V. Mandali's Colleges of Commerce & Science
- Rajiv Gandhi Institute of Technology, Mumbai (RGIT)
- Ritambhara College
- Valia College of Arts Science & Commerce

== Former schools ==
Japanese School of Mumbai - Andheri East
