= Dr Pillai Global Academy, New Panvel =

Location
- New Panvel, Navi Mumbai, Maharashtra; India
- 19.0110°N 73.11274°E

Information
- Type: Private, Coeducational, Day School, IGCSE, IB
- Motto: Local Actions...Global Options
- Established: 2007; 19 years ago
- Founders: Dr KM Vasudevan Pillai
- School board: Cambridge International Education, International Baccalaureate
- School district: Raigad district
- Principal: Prakash Nair
- Grades: KG–12
- Average class size: 25
- Language: English, Marathi
- Campus type: Suburban
- Houses: Red, Green, Blue, Yellow
Sports
Football Basketball Gymnastics	Chess; Swimming; Table Tennis
- Nickname: DPGA
- Affiliation: Mahatma Education Society
- Website: https://www.dpgapanvel.ac.in/

Dr Pillai Global Academy, New Panvel (DPGA) was established in 2007 by prominent educationist Dr. K. M. Vasudevan Pillai. It was the first school in Navi Mumbai to offer the International Baccalaureate programme. DPGA is part of a large group of prominent institutions run by the sponsoring trust Mahatma Education Society, including Pillai University.

== Academics ==
DPGA offers the Cambridge International Education curriculum from Grade 1 through Grade 10, followed by Cambridge International A Levels and the International Baccalaureate (IB) in Grades 11 and 12. The school has consistently been recognized among the leading international schools in Navi Mumbai. and has also been ranked among the top institutions across the Mumbai Metropolitan Region by the prestigious Time School Survey in the entire Mumbai Metropolitan Region.

DPGA has a strong record of academic excellence, producing world toppers in subjects such as Mathematics, Business, and others .

== Performing and Visual Arts ==
The school offers instruction in performing and visual arts as part of its curriculum. From Grade 3 onwards, students may opt for training in musical instruments such as violin, guitar, and drums. The school provides certification and training through the Associated Board of the Royal Schools of Music (ABRSM), an international music examination board.

Visual Arts and Music are offered as subjects within the IGCSE and International Baccalaureate curricula, allowing students to pursue disciplines such as music, painting, and sculpture.

The school also collaborates with Helen O’Grady International to provide developmental drama programmes.

== Sports ==
The school established an early artificial turf football ground in Navi Mumbai and provides a range of sports facilities, including football, basketball, pickleball, table tennis, swimming, carrom, and gymnastics.

== Notable Alumni ==
- Aishwarya Sridhar — National Geographic Photographer, Filmmaker & Presenter
- Aditya Rajagopal — Co-Founder, nCompass Technologies (YC-backed startup)
- Shubhankar Patankar — Machine Learning Researcher, Tesla, Inc.
- Neeraj Nair — CEO, Mergeflo.com, ex AECOM
- Rashmit Arora — Co-Founder, Gracias Granny
- Aaditya Menon — Founder at HeadRest, ex Software Engineer, Meta Platforms

== See also ==
- List of schools in Mumbai
