= Aishwarya Sridhar =

Indian wildlife photographer

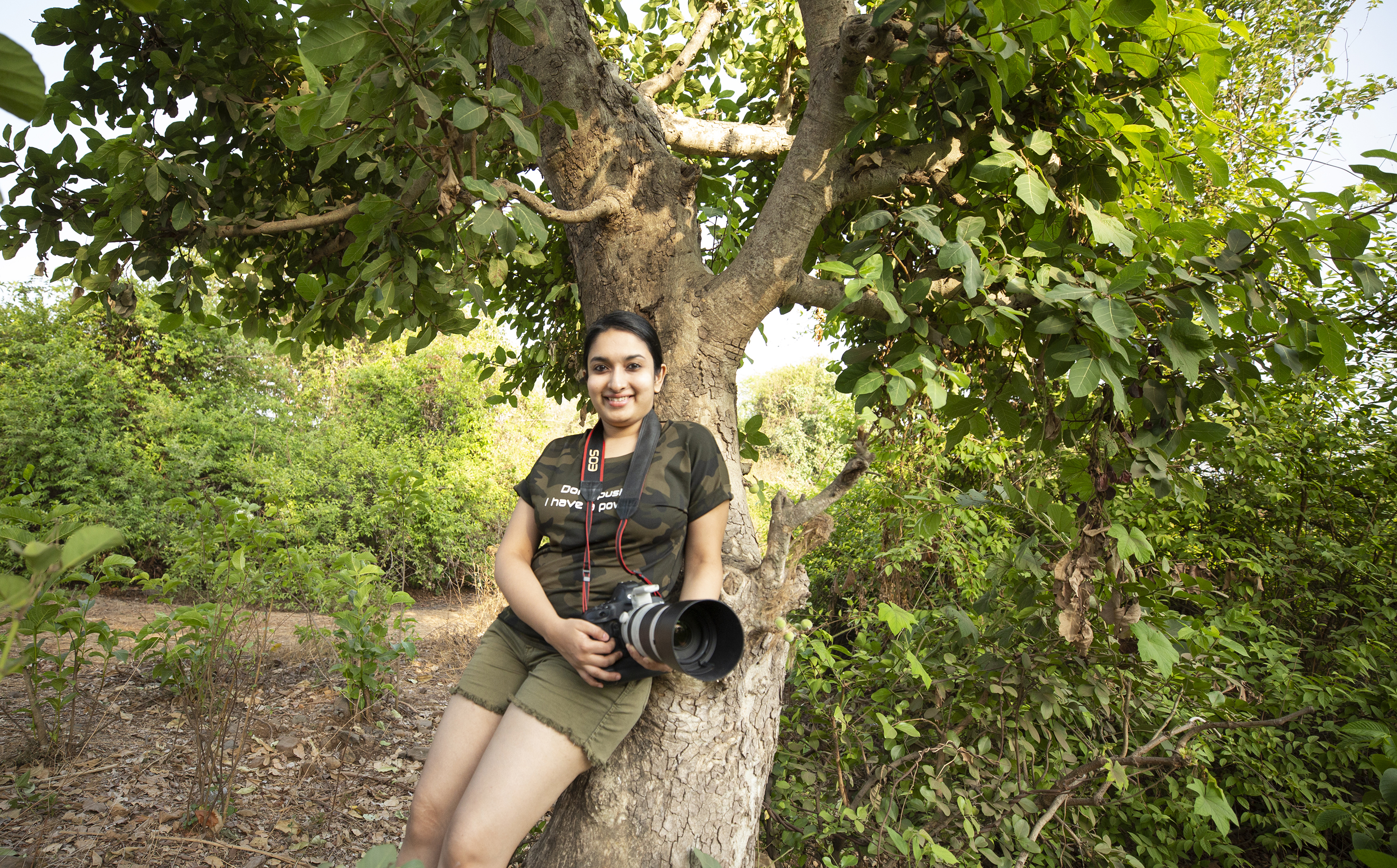
- Born: Mumbai, India
- Education: Bachelor of Mass Media
- Alma mater: Dr Pillai Global Academy, New Panvel; Pillai College of Arts, Commerce and Science
- Occupations: Wildlife photographer and filmmaker
- Notable work: Panje-The Last Wetland; The Queen of Taru
- Parents: Sridhar Ranganathan (father); Rani Sridhar (mother)
- Website: aishwaryasridhar.com

Aishwarya Sridhar (born 12 January 1997) is an Indian wildlife photographer, wildlife presenter, and documentary filmmaker residing in Navi Mumbai. She is the youngest girl to have won the Sanctuary Asia- Young Naturalist Award and the International Camera Fair. Award. In 2020, Aishwarya became the first Indian woman to win Wildlife Photographer of the Year award. She is also a member of the State Wetland Identification Committee appointed by the Bombay High Court.

She's a National Geographic Explorer and the cofounder & CEO of Bambee Studios, a production company in India specializing in natural history and environmental documentaries. Her works have been featured in BBC Wildlife, The Guardian, Sanctuary Asia, Saevus, Hindustan Times, Mumbai Mirror, Digital Camera, Mathrubhumi and Mongabay.

She has received numerous awards for her contribution towards nature including the 'Diana Award' and 'Woman Icon India Award' from the Governor of Tamil Nadu. Aishwarya is also actively involved in environmental conservation.

== Education and career ==
Aishwarya was born on 12 January, and grew up in Mumbai, India. She is the daughter of Sridhar Ranganathan and Rani Sridhar to a Tamil family. She was a student of Dr Pillai Global Academy, New Panvel and was the world topper in Business Studies in Cambridge International Examinations in 2013.. She was also a student at Pillai College of Arts, Science and Commerce now part of Pillai University as a student Mass Media.

Her father is a member of the Bombay Natural History Society (BNHS) and Aishwarya used to accompany him on treks to various forests. Her love for photography started when she was 13. From an early age, Aishwarya started trekking in the jungles of Ratnagiri in Maharashtra. Her debut documentary 'Panje-The Last Wetland' was telecast on DD National in 2018. It was about conserving the last remaining wetland of Uran named Panje. The film helped bring a Bombay High Court order to stop the reclamation of the wetland.

She has also made a feature film on a wild Bengal Tigress named Maya titled 'The Queen of Taru' which received the Best Amateur Film Award at the 9th Wildlife Conservation Film Festival (WCFF), New York City. Apart from filmmaking and photography, Aishwarya is also a poet and a writer.

== Awards and recognition ==
- 2011: Sanctuary Asia’s Young Naturalist Award
- 2013: World Topper in Cambridge International Exams in Business Studies
- 2014: World Sparrow Day Photography and Poem competition- 2nd prize.
- 2016: International Camera Fair Award
- 2018: Young Digital Camera Photographer of the Year-Winner-Small World
- 2019: Princess Diana Award
- 2019: Woman Icon India Award
- 2020: Jackson Wild Fellowship
- 2020: Wildlife Photographer of the Year by Natural History Museum, London

== Films ==
Year	Title	Type	Network	Film Festival	Awards	Status	Ref(s)
2018	Panje-The Last Wetland	Documentary	Doordarshan (DD National)	National Science Film Festival	Best Film in Fusion Category	Nominated	
2019	Queen of Taru	Feature		9th Wildlife Conservation Film Festival, New York	Best Film Award in Amateur/Emerging Category	Won	
2019	Queen of Taru	Feature		Singapore South Asian International Film Festival			
2020	Fun-Crafts with Aishwarya	Series (8-episodes)	WWF-India				
2020	Nature For Future	Series	Discovery Channel				
