= SPCE =

SPCE may refer to:

- "SPCE", stock ticker symbol for Virgin Galactic
- Sardar Patel College of Engineering, Mumbai, India
- Shri Pillappa College of Engineering, Bangalore, Karnataka, India
- School of Professional and Continuing Education, University of Central Asia

== See also ==
- Space (disambiguation)
