= Rajhans Vidyalaya =

- Mumbai, Maharashtra; India

Information
- School type: Not for profit, unaided, Private Day boarding
- Motto: विद्‌या विनयेन शोभते Vidya Vinayen Shobhate ((Sanskrit: Modesty Adorns Knowledge))
- Principal: Mrs. Ritu Dubey
- Grades: Nursery - 12
- Gender: Co-educational
- Affiliation: Central Board of Secondary Education
- Website: https://bkhm.edu.in/rajhans/

Rajhans Vidyalaya is a private day-boarding co-educational school located in Andheri West, Mumbai, Maharashtra, India. The school is affiliated to the Central Board of Secondary Education(CBSE).

The school is managed by the Bai Kabibai and Hansraj Morarji Charity Trust which was started in 1930 by philanthropist Seth Hansraj Morarji and his wife Bai Kabibai. The trust also manages Hansraj Morarji Public School, a school affiliated to the Maharashtra State Board of Secondary and Higher Secondary Education, and Bai Kabibai Balvatika, a pre-primary school.

== History ==
In 1939, during the British Raj, Dr. K.M. Munshi, the then Home Minister of Bombay and Chairman of Bai Kabibai and Hansraj Morarji Charity Trust secured a large plot of land measuring about 120 acres at Andheri for the trust. In 1982 Rajhans Vidyalaya started functioning as a separate institution within the same campus. The school received its affiliation from CBSE in 1994 and the first batch of class X students passed the AISSE in 1996.

== Campus ==
The school campus sits within the Bhavan's Campus in Andheri (West) at the foot of Gilbert Hill. The campus also houses Hansraj Morarji Public School and Bai Kabibai Balvatika, Bhavan's College, Sardar Patel College of Engineering, Sardar Patel Institute of Technology, and S. P. Jain Institute of Management and Research.

The school hosts two buildings of two floors each, constructed on over 29 acres.

The campus houses a dining hall which offers meals to the students once a day (lunch). The prices for the food is included in the annual fees.

The campus also has a theatre hall for annual day, farewells and major seminars. The sports infrastructure in the campus includes facilities for games such as cricket, basketball, football, tennis, volleyball. A gymnasium in the campus houses indoor games such as badminton, carom, table tennis and chess. A wellness clinic called AYAKSHA is also maintained in the campus. This clinic looks after the school students' health and carries out routine checkup. The theatre hall, sport facilities and the services of the wellness clinic are shared among Rajhans Vidyalaya and Hansraj Morarji Public School.

== Notable alumni ==
Shahid Kapoor - Bollywood Actor

== See also ==
- List of schools in Mumbai
