= Shanghvi =

Shanghvi is an Indian surname. Notable people with the surname include:

- Dilip Shanghvi (born 1955), Indian billionaire businessman
- Siddharth Shanghvi (born 1977), Indian author
- Utpal Shanghvi
  - Utpal Shanghvi School in Mumbai, India
