= Udayachal High School =

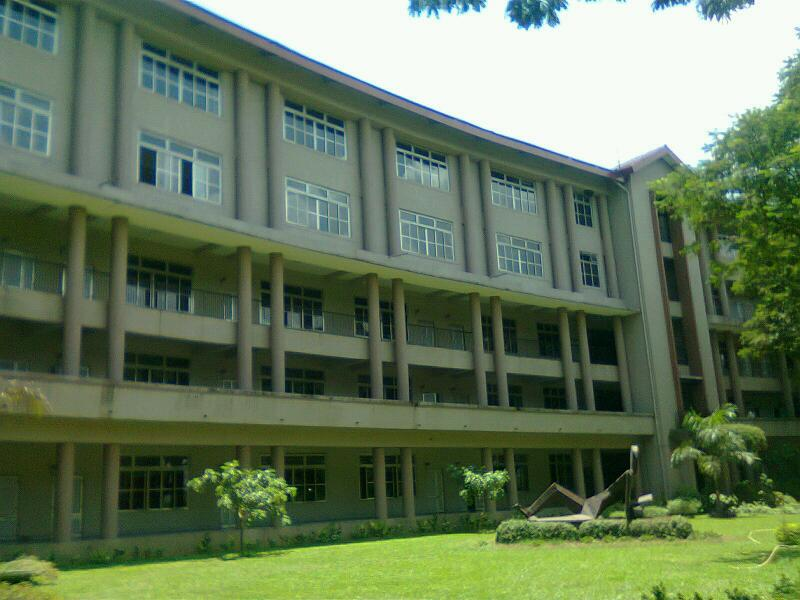

Location
- Mumbai, Maharashtra; India; 19°6′7″N 72°55′41″E

Information
- Type: Private
- Motto: Tamso ma jyotirgamaya (Leading from darkness to light)
- Established: 15 August 1955
- Founder: Pirojsha Godrej
- Locale: Vikhroli
- Principal: Rekha Pandey
- Age: 10 to 16
- Enrollment: 1563 (as of 2024)
- Language: English, Marathi, Hindi, Sanskrit, French
- Campus: Urban
- Affiliations: British Council
- Website: udayachal.com

Udayachal High School is an English-medium school situated in Vikhroli East, Mumbai, India. Udayachal means "eastern mountains". It is affiliated with the International School Award that is awarded to elite schools by the British Council. Owned by the Godrej family and established in 1955, the school has approximately 1563 students as of the academic year 2023–2024.

== Overview ==
Udayachal Schools comprises three schools, Udayachal Pre-Primary School (junior to senior kindergarten), Udayachal Primary School (standards 1–4) and Udayachal High School (standard 5–10). The current principal of the high school is Rekha Pandey. The current principal of the primary and pre-primary section is Mrs. Priya Nair. The motto of the school is "Tamaso ma jyotirgamaya", which means "from darkness, lead us to light."

== Curriculum ==
The academic year which commences in June and concludes in April consists of two terms. The first term is from June until December and the second term is from January until April. There are supervisors for English, Hindi, Marathi Math Social Science Paalash department and Science. There are approximately 40-44 classes each having 30-35 students with one class teacher and one assistant class teacher and other subject teachers. Students can choose between either Hindi-Sanskrit or Hindi-French or entire Hindi after the seventh grade and also have the option of taking either Computers/Vocational Guidance and Elements of Mechanical Engineering and have the option to also opt for Road Safety Patrol or Scouts and Guides.

== History ==
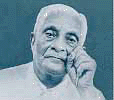
Pirojsha Godrej, the founder of Udayachal

Pirojsha Godrej, who established the Godrej Company, wanted education for his workers' children. It was in the year 1957 that Udayachal Schools were inaugurated on Independence Day .It was established for the children to provide them with quality education. During that time only the employee's children were admitted into the school.

From its inception the school was fortunate in getting an experienced and dedicated educationist, the Smt. Cooverbai J. Vakil to guide and conduct the affairs. Naoroji P. Godrej, the youngest son of Pirojsha Godrej, was a supporter of the school.

== House system ==
The objective of the house system is to foster a sense of collective responsibility and solidarity amongst students. The house system also serves as the centre of school life, with students from different houses often competing at sports and other co-curricular activities. There are four school houses:

- Nalanda (yellow)
- Takshashila (red)
- Ujjaini (blue)
- Vallabhi (green)

All of these houses have a male and female captain and vice-captain, forming the student council along with the Head-Boy and Head-Girl, Prefects and Uday Editors.

== Facilities ==
The facilities of Udayachal High School consists of a schoolhouse, a Shantiniketan, a hockey ground, handball ground, football ground, volleyball court, and a lawn. The interior school building consists of four stories. A large library with many books, autobiographies, and novels is accessible during school hours. There are separate science laboratories for physics, chemistry and biology. The science laboratories are utilized by students of classes 5–10 to carry out practical work. It also has three computer laboratories where students from classes 5 through 10 are made proficient in computers. The Knowledge Center is central to each student's academic progress. In the Knowledge Centre, students get easy access to subject-related information. In addition, students have access to periodicals and audio-visual resources and the Internet. The multipurpose Auditorium on the third floor provides a versatile space for assemblies, concerts, lectures and gatherings of all kinds, as well as for a variety of indoor games. There is an art room, music room, pottery room, and a technical room. In the art room, children are presented with opportunities for developing varied artistic interests including collage, painting, drawing and craft, Warli painting, spray painting, etc. The music room is equipped with a wide range of musical instruments for learning Hindustani Music and modern musical instruments providing children with a variety of learning experiences in music. The technical room gives students a great opportunity to learn carpentry, metalwork as well as Elements of Mechanical Engineering. The school also provides the students with great sports equipment. Yoga that takes place in the auditorium provides opportunity for enhancing the art of relaxation and concentration and to foster a healthy body, mind and soul.

There are about 38-39 classrooms. Every classroom is equipped with an interactive touch screen where teachers can show slides and PowerPoint presentations, movies, videos, etc. There is a cafeteria serving nutritious and tasty food, for use for both staff faculty and students.

For sports activities, the school has a large sports field at the rear, and sports offered include:

- Badminton
- Cricket
- Football
- Handball
- Hockey
- Volleyball

== Annual Events ==
Sports Day-The school organizes a Sports Day where students participate in games and athletic events. It is a three-day-long festival.

Teachers Day-Teacher's Day is celebrated differently in Udayachal. Children of Std X take over the responsibility on behalf of the teachers. They present a cultural programme for their respective class teachers. Teacher development programme is conducted to update the staff about the advancement in the field of education.

Annual Day-The Annual Day is conducted in the month of January. It comprises dramatics, exhibitions and ground display. The entire school takes part in it.

Founder's Day-The Founder's Day is observed in the month of August.

Parsi New Year-dances and skits are presented by the students to celebrate Parsi New Year. Customs, traditions and values of the Parsis are highlighted in the programmes.

Science Day-Science exhibition is conducted by the UHS students in the month of April in the memory of the late Smt. Soonuben Godrej. Its primary objective is to promote a scientific attitude among children.

Christmas Eve-It is celebrated with great pomp. A special programme is put up by the children and Santa Claus pays a special visit with a team of carol singers and a bag full of sweets for the children.

Independence Day Programme-The children are made aware of the sacrifices of great leaders who laid down their lives for the freedom of the country. Short plays on freedom struggle, speeches of great men and national songs are performed by the students.

Republic Day Celebrations-The Pre-primary, Primary and Secondary schools celebrate jointly on Udayachal High School Ground. It is a colourful event spreading joy and happiness in the form of dances, physical exercises and skits.

Gandhi Jayanti-Children sweep and mop their own classrooms regularly as a part of their duty. This is done with a view to make children aware of the dignity of labour. Hence a "Clean Week Campaign" is observed in the memory of Mahatma Gandhi.

Farewell Of Std 10-Students of Std 10 are invited for a grand performance by the students of Std 9.

== Extra curricular activities ==
Emphasis is placed on extracurricular activities and there are student-led clubs on campus, including the Kids for Tigers club, Nature Club, GK Club, Mangroves Club and the Heritage clubs are extremely active. Scouts and Guides, Road Safety Patrol, Inter-house debates, elocution, essay writing competitions, dramatics and sporting competitions are also a part of the cultural lives of the older students as well as the younger pupils. The school has a huge ground of approximately 200m in length and 100m in breadth. Physical Education and sports are given equal importance to enable children to compete with other schools and remain fit as well as active. Regular tournaments are held before school and after school to encourage children to showcase their talent and skills. The school takes part in all activities related to sports at the Maharashtra State level and even at national level. Several trophies and merits have been won by the school children. The school publishes a magazine yearly, called Uday. The cover page as well as back page of the magazine is selected through art competitions. It encourages the children and the staff to express their views on various subjects topics through different forms of expression like essays, poems, stories, and anecdotes. It gives a preview of the competitions held in the academic year and the meritorious achievements of students and teachers. To inculcate love for music and dance, competitions like musical fiesta and classical dance are held every year. The school is also a member of the Seeds Of Peace Org. Every year two children of Std 9 visit Maine for a yearly discussion. The school publishes a yearly magazine called Uday, which gives an overview of the activities conducted throughout the year. Udayachal makes sure all its students are not only ready to go to college, but are also prepared to succeed in all ways and forms. The 2019 edition of the TCS IT WIZ Mumbai was won by Soumya Ghosh Moharer and Jaishankar Mishra, students from Udayachal High School. Also, the PURANAVA Heritage Quiz 2019, Mumbai Edition was won by Soumya Ghosh Moharer, Kush Kapadia and Jaishankar Mishra, also students from this school.

== See also ==
- List of schools in Mumbai
