= Parle Tilak Vidyalaya English Medium School =

School in Maharashtra, India

Location
- Building 3, Ramabai Chemburkar Marg, off Hanuman Road, Vile Parle, Mumbai; Maharashtra; India; 19.10345°N 72.84786°E

Information
- School type: Private Primary, Secondary and High School
- Motto: There is nothing in this world as sacred as Knowledge
- Established: 29 June 1982
- Founder: Parle Tilak Vidyalaya Association
- Headmistress: Mrs. Kalpana Kalekar (Primary Section); Mrs. Smita Biwalkar (Secondary Section)
- Grades: 1-10
- Gender: Co-educational
- Age range: 6 - 16
- Language: English
- Campus type: Sub-urban
- Houses: Kusumagraj (Red), Premchand (Yellow), J. C. Bose (Blue) and C. V. Raman (Green)
- Colour
- Accreditation: ICSE, CBSE, MH-SSC

Parle Tilak Vidyalaya English Medium School (PTVEMS) is an English-medium school located in Vile Parle East in Mumbai, India. The school has Primary and Secondary Sections. The school is part of the Parle Tilak Vidyalaya Association, which runs a number of schools and colleges mainly in Vile Parle, Andheri and Mulund.

== History ==
The school derives its name from the Indian independence leader Sri Lokmanya Balgangadhar Tilak (1856–1920). The English medium school was established on 29 June 1982 on a piece of land adjacent to the Parle Tilak Vidyalaya Marathi Medium Secondary School, which had housed the latter's laboratories. The school has four divisions for almost every standard, up from the prior three divisions per standard.

== Culture ==
The majority of the pupils are Hindus. Morning prayers are also Hindu. Important days like Teacher's Day and Tilak Punyatithi are celebrated in the school with events and inter-school competitions. An Annual Function is held every year in December, at one of the biggest grounds in Vile Parle. The ground has a capacity of 2000 people though only 500 fill up every year. At the Annual Function prizes are given to meritorious students by a chief guest . A Send-Off Party for students who are passing out of the institution is held annually. Volleyball forms an important part of the school culture, and is considered to be the most important sport.. The school sends its cricket team to tournaments.

== Extra-curricular activities ==
Clubs include the Nature Club (affiliated with the World Wide Fund for Nature), Science Club, Consumer Club, Literary Club, Marathi Vangmay Mandal (Marathi Literary Society) and Sanskrit Sabha (a Sanskrit literary club). The school encourages students to participate in competitions organised by other associations like the Lions Club and the Rotary Club. PTVEMS students have won prizes at Azmaish inter-school competitions. PTVEMS is a member of the iNDUS Maths Club.

== See also ==
- List of schools in Mumbai
