= Parle Tilak Vidyalaya Association =

Parle Tilak Vidyalaya Association (PTVA) is an educational institution in Vile Parle, Mumbai, India. It consists of five schools - the PTV English Medium School, the PTV Marathi Medium Secondary School, the PTV Marathi Medium Primary School, Paranjape Vidyalaya, and the Parle Tilak School ICSE.

== History ==
The original Marathi Medium School was founded in 1921, as a tribute to Shri Lokmanya Bal Gangadhar Tilak. The English Medium School was founded in 1982. The ICSE medium school was founded in 2008, initially in the same building as the English Medium School. In 2012, the ICSE medium was moved to a newly constructed building.

== List of institutions ==
- Parle Tilak Vidyalaya English Medium School
- PTV Marathi Medium Secondary School
- PTV Marathi Medium Primary School
- Paranjape Vidyalaya
- Parle Tilak Vidyalaya ICSE Board]

=== Colleges and other institutions ===
- Sathaye College (Parle College, established 1959)
- M.L. Dahanukar College of Commerce
- Parle Tilak Vidyalaya Institute of Management
- Mulund College of Commerce
