= Edubridge International School =

School in Mumbai, India

Coordinates: 18.9597°N 72.8151°E

Information
- Established: 2013; 13 years ago
- Gender: Mixed
- Language: English
- Website: www.edubridgeschool.org

Edubridge International School (EIS) is an international school at Grant Road (East) in south Mumbai, India, near Chowpatty Beach. The school is located in a historic building constructed in 1908 and named after Robert Cotton Money, a 19th-century British educationalist.

== School structure ==
Edubridge is a co-educational day school. The medium of instruction is English.

== History ==
It was authorised as a World School in February 2014 by the International Baccalaureate. Edubridge International School offers only IB programmes, and the school was authorised to teach the Middle Years Programme (MYP) in 2015 and to teach the Primary Years Programme (PYP) in 2016.

== See also ==
- List of schools in Mumbai
