= Rehbar Foundation =

Charitable trust in Mumbai, India

Rehbar Foundation is a registered charitable trust established in 2000 under the Bombay Public Trust Act, 1950. The foundation operates primarily in Mumbai, India, focusing on education, healthcare, and social welfare initiatives. Its programs aim to provide access to quality education, medical support, and community welfare services to underprivileged sections of society.

== History ==
The foundation was established with the aim of contributing to holistic societal development. Over the years, it has developed several flagship programs, including the Al Barkaat Malik Muhammad Islam English School and the Malik Rakiya Khatoon Dialysis Centre, to address key social needs in education and healthcare.

== Key Initiatives ==
=== Education ===
Rehbar Foundation manages the Al Barkaat Malik Muhammad Islam English School, which was established in 2006. The school is affiliated with the Central Board of Secondary Education (CBSE), Delhi (Affiliation No. 1130375). As of the latest available data, the school enrolls approximately 2,500 students, with plans for future expansion. The foundation supports students from economically weaker backgrounds by providing free education, books, uniforms, and tuition support.

=== Healthcare ===
The Malik Rakiya Khatoon Dialysis Centre was established by the foundation to provide hemodialysis treatment on a charitable basis. The centre operates at Shatabdi Hospital (Govandi, Mumbai) and Khan Bahadur Bhabha Hospital (Kurla, Mumbai), offering free dialysis services to patients unable to afford treatment. The centre has professional staff and trained nephrologists to ensure quality care.

The foundation also organizes medical camps and emergency ambulance services in underserved areas of Mumbai. These services include general health check-ups, free medicines, diagnostic tests, specialized care, and health awareness programs.

=== Career Guidance and Skill Development ===
Rehbar Foundation conducts career guidance seminars and student counseling sessions in collaboration with educational partners, such as the SDI Team Ummeed. These programs provide students with information on higher education, scholarships, entrance examinations, career options, soft skills development, and professional mentoring.

=== Community Welfare ===
In addition to education and healthcare, Rehbar Foundation engages in various community welfare initiatives, including:

- Ambulance services and medical camps
- Support for senior citizens and women's empowerment programs
- Relief efforts during natural disasters and poverty alleviation initiatives

These programs aim to improve quality of life and create long-term social impact in Mumbai communities.
