= Sheth Gopalji Hemraj High School =

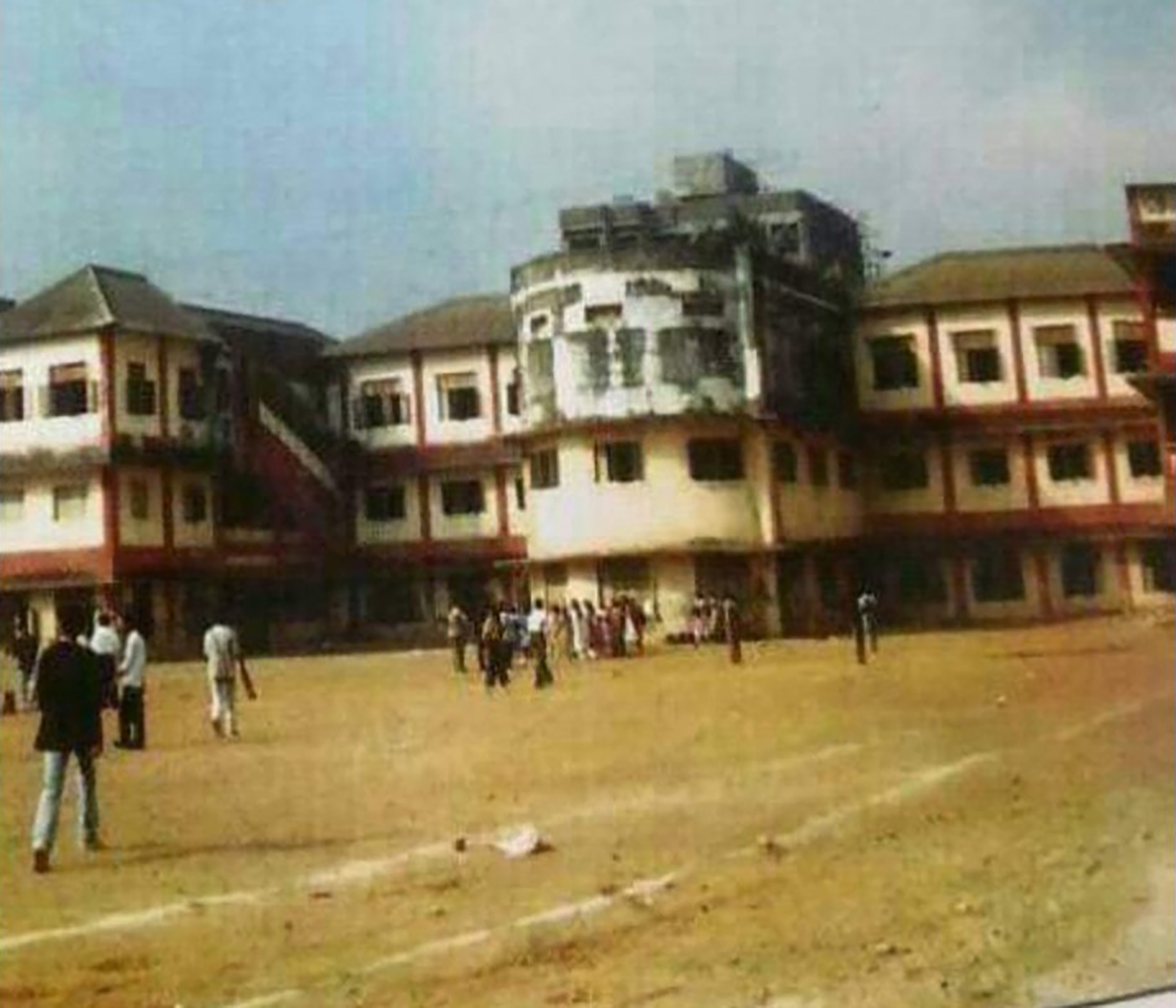
- Old View of Sheth Gopalji Hemraj High School at Borivali, Mumbai

Location
- Mahatma Gandhi Road, Sukarwadi, Borivali (East); Mumbai, Maharashtra, 400066; India; 19°13′56.5″N 72°51′35.0″E

Information
- School type: Government School
- Established: 1933
- School board: Secondary School Certificate
- Gender: Boys & Girls
- Hours in school day: 6
- Nickname: Sheth G. H. High School

Sheth Gopalji Hemraj High School is located in Borivali (East), Mumbai, India. It was established in 1933 and managed by Borivali Education Societies. The high school offers teaching in three languages - Gujarati, English and Marathi.

This is one of the oldest schools in Mumbai.

== History ==
The school is said to be inaugurated by The Father of the Nation. The old building of the school towards the southern part was a marvelous piece of architecture, it was a stone building of colonial times - 1935. But due to the trustee's decision it was demolished in 2002 in the name of a shopping complex and concrete construction of an old building. Before this demolishment there were four school buildings:

- Kindergarten
- Main building for the Gujarati and Marathi medium schools.
- English medium school building
- Administrative office building.

But now the school building has been reduced to one concrete building.

== Location ==
This school is located at one of the prosperous Western Suburban of Mumbai called Borivali. It is at five minutes walkable distance from the railway station in the east zone. The school has an adjacent State Transport Bus Depot known as Sukurwadi. Sanjay Gandhi National Park one of the tourist attraction in Mumbai is at a walkable distance from the school.

== Architecture ==
The school has a Rented building. It has 30 classrooms for instructional purposes. It has 2 other rooms for non-teaching activities. The school has a separate room for Head Master/Teacher. The school has a Pucca boundary wall. The school has a playground. The school has a library and has 1065 books in its library. The school has 6 Lift. The school does not need a ramp for disabled children to access classrooms. The school has 25 computers for teaching and learning purposes and all are functional. The school is all having a computer-aided Learning Lab.

== See also ==
- List of schools in Mumbai
