= Oberoi International School =

- OGC Campus: Oberoi Garden City, Off Western Express Highway, Goregaon (East), Mumbai - 400063 and JVLR Campus: Jogeshwari Vikhroli Link Road, Jogeshwari (East), Mumbai - 400060, India

Information
- Type: International School
- Motto: "At Oberoi International School, we have the FREEDOM TO THINK - and we EMPOWER TO BE..."
- Established: August 2008
- Chairperson: Bindu Oberoi
- Staff: Local and International
- Faculty: Local and International
- Grades: Nursery School to Grade 12
- Enrollment: 3100+
- Athletics: Badminton Courts; Basketball Courts; Cricket Pitch; Tennis Courts; Squash Court; TT Tables; Swimming; Volleyball Courts; Rock Climbing Wall
- Mascot: Leopards
- Affiliation: IB, PYP, MYP, DP, CIS, NEASC, EARCOS, ECIS, AAIE
- Website: https://www.oberoi-is.org/

Oberoi International School (OIS) is a private, co-educational International Baccalaureate school. It was instituted in Aug 2008 at Oberoi Garden City for Nursery to Grade 12 with internationally recognised education in Mumbai, India. In 2017, the school opened its second campus on Jogeshwari–Vikhroli Link Road (JVLR).

== History and foundation ==
Oberoi International School, established in 2008, has completed 17 years of operation and entered its 18th academic year in 2025–26. The school opened in August 2008 with an initial cohort of 38 students. By July 2025, enrolment had grown to over 1,620 students from Nursery to Grade 12 at the OGC campus, and 1,482 students from Nursery to Grade 11 at the JVLR campus.

The OGC campus is fully accredited by the Council of International Schools (CIS) and the New England Association of Schools and Colleges (NEASC). The school is also a member of the East Asia Regional Council of Schools (EARCOS).

Oberoi International School offers all three programmes of the International Baccalaureate (IB): the Primary Years Programme (PYP), Middle Years Programme (MYP), and Diploma Programme (DP). The JVLR campus opened in August 2017, initially offering classes from Nursery to Grade 4.

== Management ==
Oberoi International School operates across two campuses, each led by a campus head. The school functions under the strategic direction of the Board of Trustees of the Oberoi Foundation, with Bindu Oberoi as the Chair of the Board.

== Education structure ==
The school is affiliated to International Baccalaureate. It has Primary Years Programme (PYP) from Pre-KG to Grade 5 Middle Year Programme (MYP) from grade 6 to 10 International Baccalaureate Diploma Programme (IBDP) for Grades 11 and 12.

== Facilities ==
Infrastructure: The Oberoi International School's campuses were developed and built by Oberoi Realty. They have a Wi-Fi-enabled infrastructure with laboratories, art rooms and resource centers. There are drama and dance studios, Olympic-size pools, a futsal court, auditorium, music practice rooms, recording studios, a rock-climbing wall, a basketball court and tennis court.

Technology: The classrooms and campus at OIS have interactive projectors and access to tech-devices. Besides apps like Zoom, Google Hangouts, Seesaw and ManageBac are also used to teach, review and conduct teacher meetings to discuss progress. Oberoi International School has been recognised as an Apple distinguished school for the use of technology to facilitate learning.

== Athletics and extra-curricular activities ==
Extra-curricular activities include ace-speech drama, film making, soft skill workshop, art skills, photography, ballet, rhythmic gymnastics, western and Indian vocal, rope and pole mallakhamb and yoga. In-class activities include "nutty scientist", sculpting and moulding, kathak, QtPi robotics, calligraphy, chess and MAD science NASA.

The school held a film festival in 2019. Other events hosted by the school include the TEDxYouth@OIS,

The school has 47 sports teams. Athletics include skating, football, rock climbing, basketball, swimming, gymnastic, cricket, table tennis, rip stick, taekwondo, karate, kickboxing, squash, mini-tennis.

== Awards and recognitions ==
- Both campuses of Oberoi International School have been recognised as Apple Distinguished Schools for the periods 2019–2022 and 2022–2025.
- Oberoi International's JVLR campus has been credited with Gold Status for Leadership in Energy and Environmental Design (LEED) by the United States Green Building Council (USGBC).
- The school has been consistently awarded amongst the top 3 international schools in the city in the Times of India Survey, Hindustan Times Survey, and Education World Survey.

== See also ==
- List of schools in Mumbai
