= M.L. Dahanukar College of Commerce =

Commerce college in Mumbai, India

- Former name: Parle Commerce College
- Established: 1960; 66 years ago
- Principal: Dr.Vinay Bhole(Former Principal of Model College, Dombivli)
- Location: Mumbai, Ville Parle, Maharashtra, India
- Website: www.mldcc.com

M. L. Dahanukar College of Commerce (also known as Dahanukar College) is a commerce stream college in suburban Mumbai, India. The college is affiliated to the University of Mumbai and was founded by the Parle Tilak Vidyalaya Association in 1960. As of 2011, the college had an NAAC accreditation of B+ and enrolled over 5,200 students.

== History ==
M. L. Dahanukar College of Commerce was established in June 1960, by Parle Tilak Vidyalaya Association as the Parle Commerce College. It was renamed Mahadev Laxman Dahanukar College of Commerce in 1961 as a result of the generous donation of ₹ 3 lakhs from the Industrial House of Dahanukars. It was the first commerce college in the suburbs of Mumbai to 'impart quality education to the youth of Mumbai, particularly to the residents of Vile Parle and neighboring suburbs'.

== Academics ==
Dahanukar College is a co-educational institution and is affiliated to the University of Mumbai. The Institution receive grant-in-aid of the State Government. The college is recognized by the University Grants Commission under section 2 (f) and 12 (b) of the U. G. C. Act of 1956.

=== Curriculum ===
As an affiliated college of the University of Mumbai, M. L. Dahanukar College follows the curriculum and regulation of the university. The syllabi in Commerce and Management Studies incorporate multi-disciplinary / interdisciplinary components and a certain amount of flexibility. The college has 8 departments viz. Commerce, Accountancy, Economics, Mathematics and Statistics, Psychology, Business Law, Business Communication and Environmental Studies. The institution offers a few optionals / electives both at B.Com. and M.Com. level.

The college also offers the career oriented courses viz. Bachelor of Management Studies and Bachelor of Commerce (accounts and finance), Bachelor of Commerce (banking and insurance), Bachelor of Commerce (financial markets), Bachelor of Mass Media, Bachelor of Science in information technology, Master of Science in information technology. These two self-financing courses not only provide better choice for students but also cater to the demands and needs of industries and business establishment. Five postgraduate diploma courses are also offered for the benefit of students. These diploma courses are in business management, marketing management, financial management, material management and human resource development.

The college also offers P. E. 1 course of I. C. A. I. Co-curricular activities are encouraged through various associations in the college. A one-day workshop was organized by the Department of Accountancy on Financial Accounting and Auditing.

=== Library ===
There are 45,000 books in the library. The library subscribes to 30 journals / periodicals. There is also facility for inter-library exchange. The library provides book-bank facility to the needy students.

== Student life ==
The college has facilities both for Indoor games and outdoor games. A large number of students have participated in various sports events at the intercollegiate & regional levels.

The college, like other colleges in Mumbai City, has its own annual festival named "Kurukshetra". Sporting and cultural activities play an important role in the festival. The college also participates in various inter-college events including Mumbai University's "Youth Fest" where it stood third in academic year 2010-11 beating 165 other colleges.
