= St. Xavier's Boys' Academy, Mumbai =

St. Xavier's Boys' Academy Mumbai

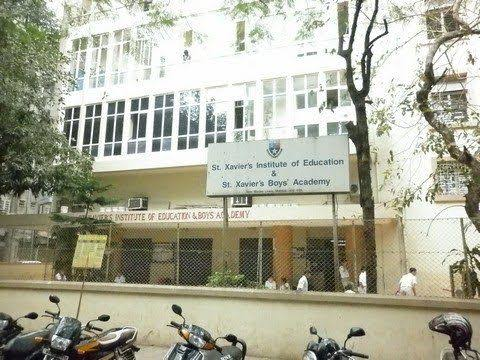
- St. Xavier's Boys' Academy, Mumbai

Location
- Marine Lines, Mumbai, Maharashtra; India; 18°56′9″N 72°49′41″E

Information
- Type: Private primary and secondary school
- Motto: Latin: Tenebras illuminare et vias dirigere (To enlighten darkness and direct paths)
- Religious affiliation: Catholicism
- Denomination: Jesuits
- Patron saint: St Francis Xavier
- Established: June 1957; 69 years ago
- Founder: Fr. Agnel Sologran, SJ
- Administrator: Fr. Arul John Bosco SJ
- Principal: Fr. Arul John Bosco SJ
- Teaching staff: 37
- Grades: PreK-10
- Gender: Boys
- Enrollment: c. 900
- Language: English medium
- Houses: Kabir; Nehru; Tagore; Tilak
- Nickname: SXBA
- Accreditation: Maharashtra State Board of Secondary Education
- Publication: Academy Boys' Chronicle
- Website: www.sxba.in

St. Xavier's Boys' Academy, Mumbai (SXBA) is a private primary and secondary school for boys located in Marine Lines, Mumbai, Maharashtra, India. The school was established by the Jesuits in June 1957 and caters to students enrolled from Jr Kg through 10. The school is accredited by the Maharashtra State Board of Secondary Education to prepare students for their Secondary School Certificate (SSC) Examination. SXBA accepts boys of all communities, castes, or creeds.

== History ==
Following are the years and all the events that were newly introduced in SXBA in the past:

- June 1957 - St. Xavier's Boys' Academy school was established. The founder of this school was Fr. Agnel Sologran SJ and the first principal was Fr. Eudel Palomera
- 6 December 1957 - 1st inspection of the academy by Inspector Save
- 10 December 1957 - 1st picnic to the National park by train
- 22 December 1957 - 1st Christmas party on the terrace of the academy with fancy dress, games, refreshments, gifts
- 5 March 1958 - 1st Annual Sports Day at Brabourne Stadium
- 8 and 9 March 1958 - 1st Parents' Day Celebrations (then called Academy Day)
- 4 March 1958 - The academy's 1st long excursion to Kashmir and North India
- 6 August 1958 - The lift starts functioning, but was for parents and visitors, not students
- 17 January 1959 - 1st social gathering for parents, teachers and students in 3 groups, according to standards
- 26 September 1959 - 1st 'Dress As You Like Day' introduced in the school. One day in a month set aside for this
- 12 March 1960 - The academy is recognised as a full-fledged high school for standards 5th to 11th
- 29 August 1960 - 1st Medical Inspection in the academy - strong advice of the doctor
- 23 December 1960 - Standards 9 introduces the Christmas Tableau - moving scenes of the Nativity of Jesus
- 4 January 1961 - 1st farewell party of the first batch of S.S.C. students
- 5 June 1961 - 1st S.S.C. results received by the academy. All students in the English medium were declared successful and in the first grade.
- 15 July 1961 - Fr. Palomera says, "It is Election Day - for the first time in the Academy, Captains and Vice Captains are elected in a truly democratic manner"
- September 1961 - The Drama and Music club combine to broadcast in All India Radio, the half-hour show on the Wonderland Programme
- 11 October 1961 - The academy joins the Harris Shield Cricket Tournament
- 1 September 1962 - 1st quiz for the Higher classes on current events and general knowledge
- 20 July 1963 - A swimming club started functioning
- 1975-1976 - 1st and the last H.S.C. batches of Science and Commerce. Fr. Netto said
- 1984 - After the S.S.C. students exams, a batch of S.S.C. students went an adventure led by Pramod Kasliwal and trekked to the Himalayas

== Management ==
=== Principals ===
The following individuals have served as principals of the academy.

Ordinal	Officeholder	Term start	Term end	Time in office
1	Fr. Eudel Palomera, SJ	1957	1966	8–9 years
1	Fr. Lancy Rodricks, SJ	1966	1969	2–3 years
1	Fr. Ernest Netto, SJ	1969	1971	1–2 years
1	Fr. Ernest Netto, SJ	1974	1981	6–7 years
1	Preema Noronha	2011	2023	11–12 years

=== Managers ===
The following individuals have served as managers of the academy.

Ordinal	Officeholder	Term start	Term end	Time in office	Notes
1	Fr. Edmund Carasco, SJ	2001	2002	0–1 years	Manager and principal
2	Fr. Herman Castelino, SJ	June 2007	June 2008	0–1 years	
3	Fr. Joe Saldanha, SJ	June 2008	August 2009	0–1 years	
4	Fr. Lawrie Ferrao, SJ	August 2009	May 2010	0–1 years	
5	Fr. John Misquitta, SJ	June 2010	June 2011	0–1 years	
6	Fr. Blaise D'Souza, SJ	June 2011	Incumbent	14–15 years	
6	Fr. Arul John Bosco SJ	November 2023	2023–present	2–3 years	

== School houses ==
All students from standards 5th to 10th are assigned into various houses as part of the house system. There are four houses:

- Kabir house (yellow) - named after Kabir, a Hindu saint
- Tagore house (green) - named after Rabindranath Tagore, an Indian poet, writer and freedom fighter
- Nehru house (red) - named after Jawaharlal Nehru, India's 1st prime minister and a freedom fighter
- Tilak house (blue) - named after Bal Gangadhar Tilak, an Indian freedom fighter and teacher

The houses are given to boys once they reach 5th standard, and the house remains the same until the 10th standard.

== See also ==
- List of Jesuit schools
- List of schools in Mumbai
- Violence against Christians in India
