= St. Gregorios High School =

Location
- Gregorios Path, Besides Fairlawn, V.N. Purav Marg, Chembur, Mumbai; Chembur; Maharashtra 400071; 19.050549°N 72.902402°E

Information
- School type: Private, Co-Educational
- Religious affiliation: Christian
- Founded: 1994
- Faculty: 120+
- Average class size: 30
- Campus size: 2 acres (8,100 m^{2})
- Houses: Aqua, Fauna, Flora, Terra
- Athletics: NO International
- Mascot: None
- Affiliations: Indian Certificate of Secondary Education
- Website: http://www.stgregorios.school

St. Gregorios High School is a coeducational secondary school located in Chembur, Mumbai, India. It is affiliated to the Indian Certificate of Secondary Education (ICSE) and Indian School Certificate (ISC) and was established in 1992. The principal of the school is Mr. Jamal.

== Overview ==
=== Recognition ===
.

=== Rankings ===
Agency	Rank	Year	Location
Hindustan Times	3rd	2016	Mumbai East
Hindustan Times	3rd	2015	Mumbai East
Hindustan Times	3rd	2014	Mumbai East
Hindustan Times	8th	2012	Mumbai East
Hindustan Times	9th	2010	Mumbai East
ClassFever	10th	2016	Maharashtra
ClassFever	6th	2016	Mumbai
ClassFever	1st	2016	Chembur
ClassFever	3rd	2016	ISC schools in Mumbai
ClassFever	3rd	2016	ISC Schools in Maharashtra

== School Features ==
The school follows the ICSE course syllabus, as set out by the CISCE board in Delhi.

It runs classes from kindergarten (officially 'Nursery') to the 12th grade. The classes are divided into 4 parts – Pre-Primary or Pre-School (consisting of Nursery, Junior Kindergarten and Senior Kindergarten), Primary or Elementary (from the 1st to the 5th Grade), Secondary or Middle School (the 6th, 7th and 8th Grades) and High School (from the 9th to the 12th Grade). The average class size is of 30 students.

The students are divided among four houses named Aqua, Fauna, Flora and Terra which compete through the year in extracurricular activities. The school has a distinct Student Council and looks after the discipline and organises all events. It is led by the Head Boy and Head Girl, who work together with House Captains, Vice Captains, Sports and Discipline Captains and the Discipline Squad. The middle section maintains its own Student Council. Each house is looked after by a teacher-in-charge. The School is an active participant in sports and co-curriculars.

== See also ==
- List of schools in Mumbai
