= Pillai University =

University in Navi Mumbai, Maharashtra, India

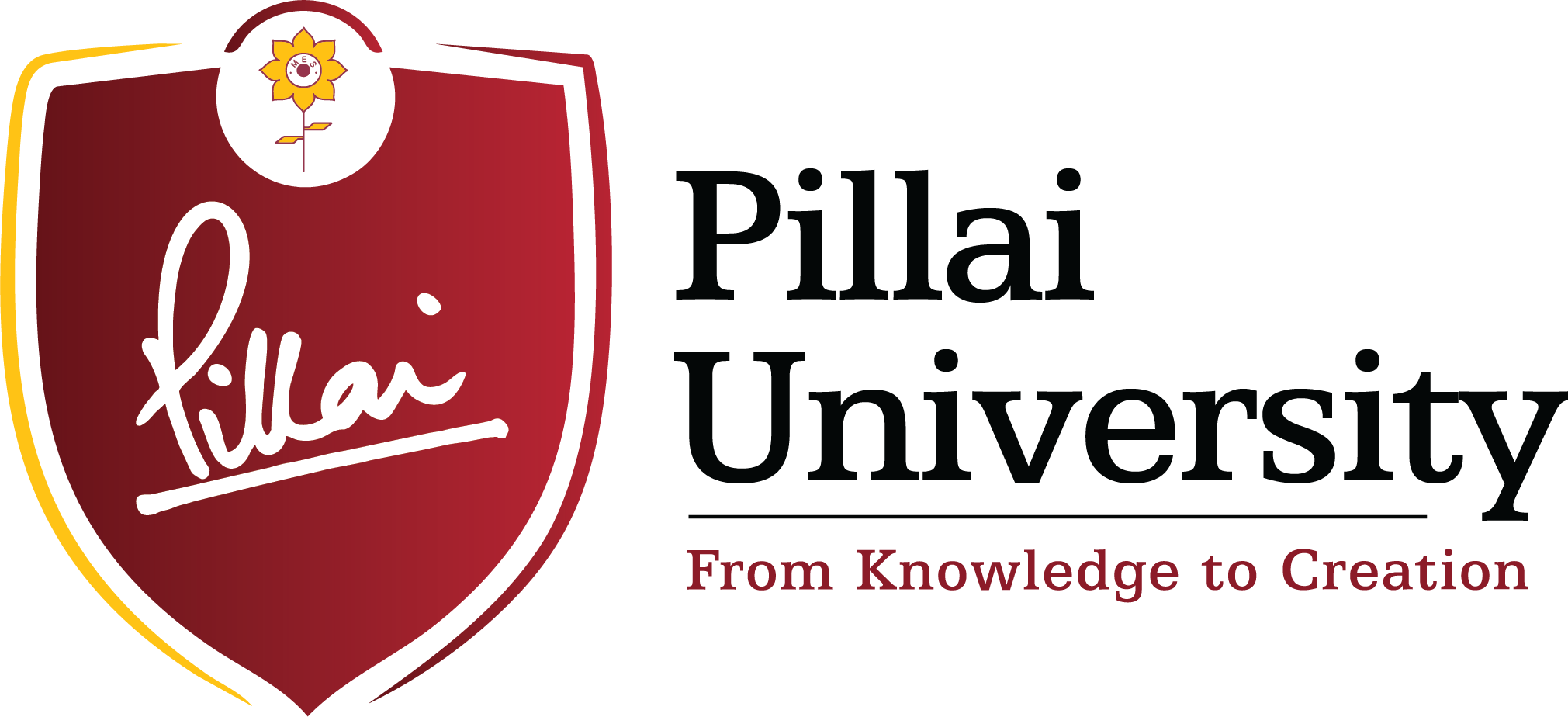
- Other name: Pillai College
- Former names: Pillai College of Engineering, Pillai Institute of Management Studies and Research, Pillai College of Architecture
- Motto: ज्ञानात् सृजनम्
- Motto in English: From Knowledge to Creation
- Type: Private
- Established: 2025
- Founder: K. M. Vasudevan Pillai
- Parent institution: Mahatma Education Society
- Accreditation: NAAC Grade:A+
- Academic affiliations: AICTE; GOM; UGC; Association of Indian Universities
- President: Dr K.M Vasudevan Pillai
- Location: Navi Mumbai, Maharashtra, India; 18.9904°N 73.1281°E
- Campus: 13.23 acres (5.35 ha); Urban/Metro
- Nickname: Pillaite
- Website: www.pillai.edu.in

Pillai University is a private university located in Navi Mumbai, Maharashtra, India. It was established in 2025 as a self-financed State Private University under the provisions of the Maharashtra Private Universities (Establishment and Regulation) Act. The university was recognized by the Government of Maharashtra on 1 September 2025.

Pillai University is the first State Private University established in Navi Mumbai. It was constituted through the enactment of Maharashtra Act No. 45 of 2025.

== History ==
Pillai University, Navi Mumbai, was formed by merging three of the most reputable institutions run by Mahatma Education Society in New Panvel. They are Pillai College of Architecture (Autonomous) established in 1992, Pillai Institute of Management Studies and Research (Autonomous) established in 1998, Pillai College of Engineering (Autonomous) established in 1999. The university was founded by Mahatma Education Society founder Dr. K. M. Vasudevan Pillai, who also became the first president and chancellor of the university. The University was formally inaugurated on February 10, 2026 by Minister of Higher and Technical Education Minister Chandrakant Patil.

== Academics ==
The university offers undergraduate, postgraduate, and doctoral programs across diverse disciplines. It offers programs in engineering, architecture, design, business, commerce, science, arts and education.

Alongside this, Pillai University has research centers in remote sensing, urban planning, artificial intelligence and robotics, aviation, healthcare, manufacturing, and several emerging fields.

== Sports ==
Pillai University has facilities for football, volleyball, basketball, fully equipped gymkhanas, rock climbing wall, rifle shooting range, badminton courts and many more. Pillai University has partnered with CIES (The International Centre for Sports Studies, Switzerland), one of the world’s premium bodies for Sports Management Education, to conduct the prestigious FIFA/CIES Executive Program in Sports Management in India.

== See also ==
- List of Mumbai Colleges
- List of private universities in India
