= The Universal School =

International primary and secondary school in Mumbai

- Tardeo, Mumbai; Mumbai, Maharashtra, 400007; India

Information
- Type: Private School
- Established: 1999; 27 years ago
- School board: Cambridge Assessment International Education
- Chairman: Jesus S.M Lall
- Principal: Ms. Shunila Joy Chauhan
- Grades: 1 to 10
- Gender: Co-educational
- Affiliation: University of Cambridge
- Website: www.universal.edu.in

The Universal School is a chain of international schools located across over 40 locations across India. The education model is a co-educational day and residential schools that provide education for primary with upper primary and secondary. The school is associated with International General Certificate of Secondary Education (IGCSE) and is authorized to offer the Cambridge IGCSE exams for grade 10th. The school chain has over 40000 students with 15 full-time teachers.

== History ==
The universal was established in the early 2000s and is being managed by Jesus Lall. In March 2019, the school announced a freeze on fees from grade 1-10 for the next ten years. Over time universal has opened 24 schools and colleges around Asia.

== Facilities ==
The Universal School has classrooms, large libraries, state-of-the-art computer Laboratories, They also have separate laboratories for physics, chemistry, and biology, transportation. The school also has tried few new ideas like having non rectangular classrooms, flexible partitions to move around the class and change the layout. They introduced a vermicompost plot for students to help them learn vermiculture.

== Academics ==
The school offers the following education programmes:

1. Pre-primary Programme: The 4-year Pre-primary Programme is based on the British National Curriculum's Early Years Foundation Stage (EYFS).
2. Cambridge Primary: This programme is built for grades I to V which helps in developing Mathematics, English & Science knowledge in young children.
3. Cambridge Secondary Programme 1: This is a 3-year programme for grades 6-8 and is based on the Cambridge Secondary 1 Programme.
4. International General Certificate in Secondary Education (IGCSE): This programme is offered for grades IX and X. It is a 2-year programme that develops a creative thinking, inquiry & problem solving, and gives excellent preparation for the next stage in education.

== Awards and recognition ==
- The Universal School is a recipient of the British Council International School Award.

== Controversy ==
=== 2013 - School bus accident ===
In 2013, a school bus carrying 40 students of the Universal school at Thane toppled over during overspeeding in which 4 students were injured. The school management claimed the bus was hit by another vehicle while the parents and the police stated the bus driver was at fault.

=== 2017 - Parent school face off over fee hike ===
In June 2017, the Universal school at Dahisar saw a faceoff between parents and the school management with regards to the fee hike proposal. The issue began with the parents demanding a justification for the extraordinary hike in the fees. They also alleged that school was discriminating with their children because of their opposition to the fee hike. The school threatened to expel the students and sent them back home. However the inspector of schools directed them not to do so. The issue later escalated after the school expelled 70 students for non payment of fees. In the meantime, the Malad unit of Universal School expelled 100 students. At this stage the Government of Maharashtra threatened to shut down the school while protests were staged by Shiv Sena. A few parents moved Maharashtra State Commission for Protection of Child Rights (MSCPCR) protesting against the school authorities. The parents were assured by Education Minister Vinod Tawade that their children would not be expelled. Later after negotiations by the education inspector of Mumbai the school and parents agreed on the fee hike. The parents agreed to deposit fees in an escrow account while the founder Jesus Lall said that without paying the fees no student would be allowed into the school. Following a similar issue raised by parents of Universal school Nasik, the Mumbai High court observed that there needed to be a mechanism to monitor the private schools.

=== 2022 - Income tax authorities action ===
In March 2022, the income tax authorities carried out raids at 25 premises of the institute along with the founder Mr Jesus Lall's home in Mumbai. Unaccounted cash worth Rs 27 lacs and jewellery worth Rs 3.9 crore was seized during the action. Further documents recovered showed borrowings of Rs 55 crore borrowings as Hundi and repayments in form of promissory notes. Additionally the authorities also discovered at least 2 dozen immovable properties of which several were benami and others were undisclosed sources of income. The department provisionally attached the properties for further action. Earlier in 2012, there was a tax case against the institute as well, which was ruled partly against the institute's founder.

== See also ==
- List of schools in Mumbai
- List of schools in India
