= Adarsha Vidyalaya =

Location
- Sahakar Nagar, Shell Colony, Chembur; Mumbai, Maharashtra, 400 071; India; 19.06°N 72.89°E

Information
- School type: Co-education Affiliated school
- Opened: 1958
- Status: Open
- School board: Maharashtra State Board
- School district: Mumbai Suburban District
- Authority: Kerala People's Education Soc.
- Session: Day
- Headmaster: Radhika Lohith
- Enrollment: approx. 2000
- Classes offered: Nursery to S.S.C.
- Language: English, Hindi, Marathi, Malayalam
- Campus type: Urban
- Accreditation: Maharashtra State Board of Secondary and Higher Secondary Education

Adarsha Vidyalaya is an English language school located in Sahakar Nagar, Shell Colony, Chembur, Mumbai, India. Established in 1958, it is run by the Kerala Peoples Education Society (KPES). The school is one of the few in Mumbai that teaches the Malayalam language. Tamil and Urdu are also offered. However, students are expected to speak English while in class.

== Educational Amenities ==
The school has a science lab, computer lab, library, and audio-visual room.

== Extracurricular Activities ==
Adarsha Vidyalaya elects a head boy and head girl every year. The school celebrates Indian Independence Day, Republic Day, Teacher's Day, Children's Day, and Christmas. The institution has participated in interscholastic sports, elocution, science exhibitions, drawing, dance, and various other cultural activities. Adarsha Vidyalaya also publishes a school magazine annually.

== See also ==
- List of schools in Mumbai
