= Al Barkaat Malik Muhammad Islam English School =

Private school in Mumbai

- Kurla, Mumbai, Maharashtra, India; India

Information
- Type: Private school
- Motto: Indeed, the real beauty is of knowledge and manners
- Established: 2006
- Founder: Rehbar Foundation
- Affiliation: CBSE
- Website: Official website

Al Barkaat Malik Muhammad Islam English School is a co-educational English-medium institution in Kurla, Mumbai. Founded in 2006, it is affiliated with the Central Board of Secondary Education (CBSE). The school is managed by the Rehbar Foundation and provides primary and secondary education, up to grade 10.

== History ==
The school was established in 2006 under the Rehbar Foundation, an educational initiative intended to promote inclusive and quality learning in Mumbai. Located in Kurla, it was founded to combine academic study with cultural and moral education. Over time, the institution has introduced smart classrooms and subject laboratories.

== Campus and facilities ==
The campus includes E-learning classrooms, computer and science laboratories, and a library and reading room. Digital literacy and project-based learning form part of the academic programme.

== Academics ==
The school offers classes at three levels:

- Pre-primary: Nursery, Junior KG and Senior KG
- Primary: Standards I–IV covering English, Hindi, Marathi, Mathematics, Science, Social Studies and Computers
- Secondary: Standards V–X including Information Technology and Artificial Intelligence

Teaching follows the CBSE curriculum framework focused on academic development and life-skills training.

== Extracurricular activities ==
Students take part in sports, cultural programmes and inter-school competitions. The school's cricket team has competed successfully in Mumbai tournaments:

- In 2025 it won the Mumbai Indians Junior Tournament, when student Deven Yadav scored 111 runs not out.
- The team has also won the Giles Shield inter-school cricket competition.
- The Mumbai Schools Sports Association records its participation in the Giles Shield and Harris Shield events.

== Awards and recognition ==
- Best Innovative School – Youth Ideathon (2023), awarded by the CBSE Board for student-led projects.
