= Mount Litera School International =

Coordinates: 19.0646°N 72.8595°E

- Bandra Kurla Complex, Bandra- East

Information
- Type: private School
- Established: 2014
- Principal: Priya Anand
- Faculty: International
- Grades: K-12
- Campus type: International
- Affiliation: International Baccalaureate
- Website: mlsi.in

Mount Litera School International is an international school situated in Bandra, Mumbai. It is a co-educational day school, being managed and run by Zee Learn Ltd. The school is affiliated with the International Baccalaureate Organisation (IBO) and has the classes from playgroup through class XII.

== History ==
Mount Litera School International was founded in 2014, to provide a balance between knowledge and learning from around the world. The school is being managed by Zee Learn Ltd, an education chain, that has over 80 schools across the country under the brand name Mount Litera Zee School, it also runs Kidzee which is Asia's largest preschool network with over 1350 preschools across the country.

In 2018, Mount Litera School International took the initiative to help the flood-affected victims of Kerala on Friday. The school organized the initiative along with the Goonj Foundation.

== Campus ==
The school features spacious classrooms equipped with interactive whiteboards, laboratories for science, maths, two libraries, a media center, and an auditorium. It also provides indoor sports games such as table tennis, badminton, and basketball.

== Academics ==
The school is affiliated with the International Baccalaureate Organisation (IBO) and has been authorized to run the following education programme;

- Primary Years Programme
- Middle Years Programme
- Diploma Programme

== Awards ==
- Mount Litera School International has been ranked among the top 20 international day schools in India by the EducationWorld C-fore Survey 2017.

== See also ==
- Dhirubhai Ambani International School
- Podar International School
