= Vile Parle =

Neighborhood in Mumbai

Vile Parle Parla
- suburb
- Location within Mumbai
- Coordinates: 19.10°N 72.83°E
- Country: India
- State: Maharashtra
- District: Mumbai Suburban
- City: Mumbai

Government
  - Type: Municipal Corporation
  - Body: Brihanmumbai Municipal Corporation (MCGM)

Languages
  - Official: Marathi
- Time zone: UTC+5:30 (IST)
- Postal code: 400057
- Area code: 022
- Vehicle registration: MH02
- Lok Sabha constituency: Mumbai North West (covers western part of the suburb); Mumbai North Central (covers eastern part of the suburb)
- Vidhan Sabha constituency: Andheri West (covers western part of the suburb); Vile Parle (covers eastern part of the suburb)

Vile Parle (Marathi pronunciation: [ʋile paːɾle], also known as Parla) is a suburb and also the name of the railway station in the Western suburb of Mumbai. Vile Parle has a significantly strong base of Marathi and Gujarati population. It serves as the location of the first Parle factory.

== History ==
The name Vile Parle has two widely cited etymological theories regarding its origin:

Village Combination: The name is thought to be a portmanteau derived from two smaller villages that historically existed in the area: 'Vidlai' (or Padale), located near modern-day Santacruz, and 'Irle', near modern-day Andheri. The combination of these names, possibly referred to as 'Vidlai Padlai' in old records, eventually simplified to Vile Parle. An alternative theory suggests the name is derived from the two prominent local temples: Virleshwar and Parleshwar.

The area's modern development began with the establishment of the railway station. The arrival of the Bombay, Baroda, and Central India Railway (BB&CI) in the late 19th century spurred residential growth in the Western Suburbs, with Vile Parle acting as a key residential hub.

Historically, Vile Parle was originally composed of fishing and farming villages. The original settlers of the area included the East Indian Christians and the Pachkalashis (or Pathare Kshatriya Hindus).

Vile Parle gained significant national recognition with the establishment of the Parle Products factory. The company, which would go on to create the iconic Parle-G biscuit, set up its first manufacturing unit in Vile Parle in 1929, cementing the suburb's name in Indian consumer history.

== Economy ==
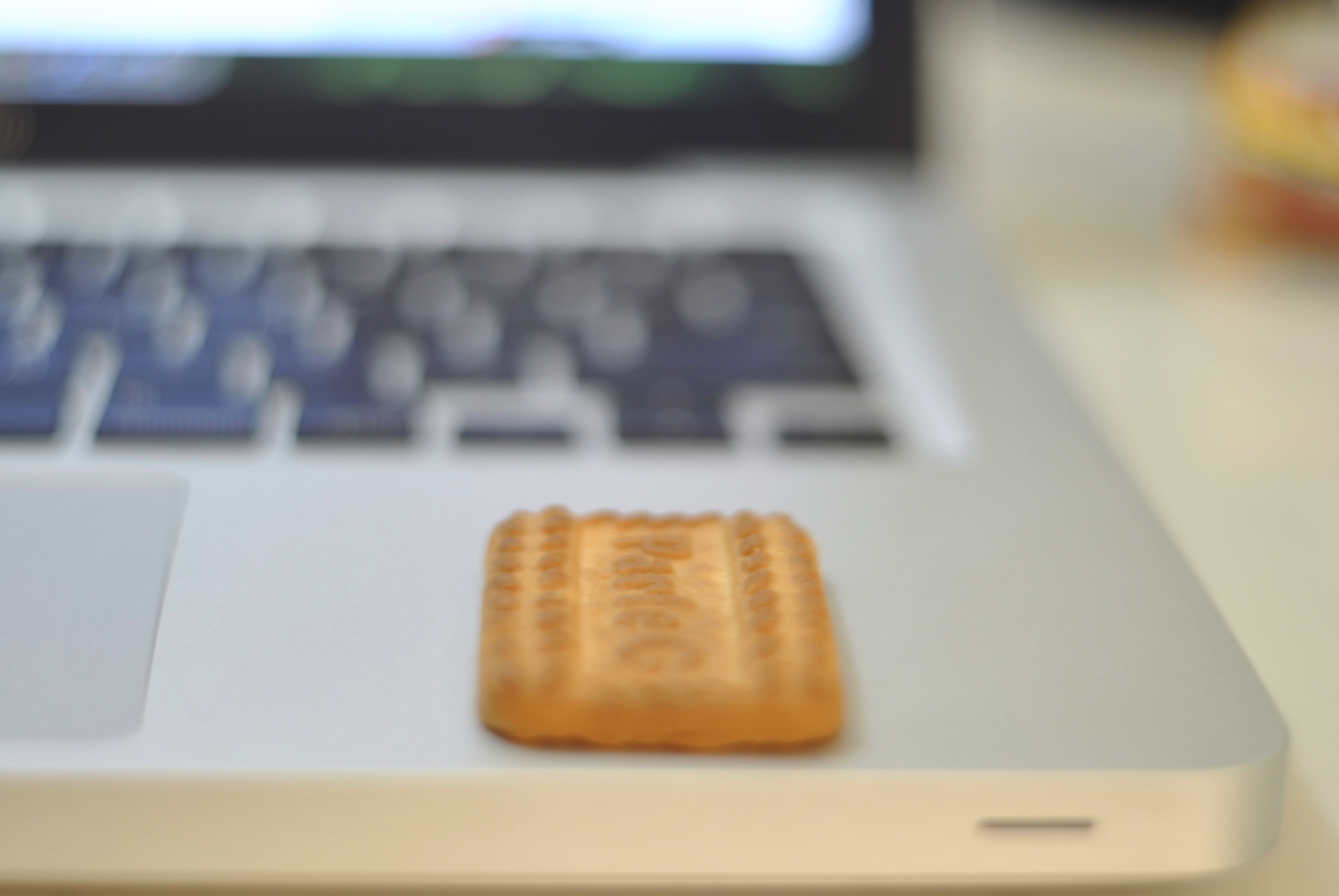
The first Parle-G factory was established in Vile Parle

Vile Parle's economy is defined by its legacy in Manufacturing and its current status as a major educational hub for Mumbai. The suburb is widely considered the second major educational center after the Churchgate–Charni Road area in South Mumbai.

=== Manufacturing and Corporate Legacy ===
Parle Products Origin: Vile Parle is the birthplace of Parle Products, one of India's leading confectionery and biscuit manufacturers. The company, known globally for its iconic Parle-G biscuit, was established here in 1929 and derived its name directly from the suburb.

Factory Status: The original Parle factory in Vile Parle East, famously associated with the aroma of freshly baked biscuits, was permanently shut down in July 2016 due due low production capacity, marking the end of a long-standing local landmark. The company's corporate headquarters, however, remain in the area.

=== Education Hub ===
Vile Parle is a prominent educational center in the Western Suburbs, supported primarily by two major trusts:

Shri Vile Parle Kelavani Mandal (SVKM): This charitable trust is responsible for transforming Vile Parle into a significant educational center since 1934. It operates a large complex of highly reputed institutions, including:

Narsee Monjee Institute of Management Studies (NMIMS) (Deemed-to-be University)

Mithibai College of Arts, and Chauhan Institute of Science

Narsee Monjee College of Commerce and Economics

Dwarkadas J. Sanghvi College of Engineering

Parle Tilak Vidyalaya Association (PTVA): This organization also contributes significantly to the suburb's educational landscape, operating multiple schools and colleges.

The concentration of these institutions results in a constant flow of students throughout the day, solidifying the area's economic identity as a key destination for higher education.

== Educational institutions ==
=== Colleges ===
==== Medical Colleges ====
- Hinduhridaysamrat Balasaheb Thackeray Medical College and Dr. R. N. Cooper Municipal General Hospital

==== Engineering Colleges ====
- SVKM's NMIMS

==== General Colleges ====
- M.L. Dahanukar College of Commerce
- Mithibai College
- Narsee Monjee College of Commerce and Economics
- Sathaye College (Parle College)
- Usha Pravin Gandhi College of Arts, Science and Commerce

==== Management Colleges ====
- SVKM's NMIMS

=== Schools ===
- Chatrabhuj Narsee Memorial School
- Jamnabai Narsee School
- Madhavrao Bhagwat High School
- M P Shah English High School
- Parle Tilak Vidyalaya English Medium School
- St Joseph's Convent High School, Mumbai
- Parle Tilak Vidyalaya Marathi Medium Secondary School
- St. Xavier's High School, Vile Parle
- Utpal Shanghvi Global School
