= NES International School =

NES International School Mumbai
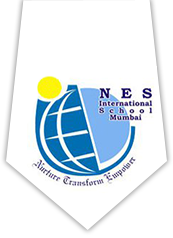

Location
- Swapna Nagari, Malabar Hill Road, Mulund West, Mumbai, Maharashtra 400082, Mumbai, Maharashtra 400082; Mulund; Mulund; Mumbai, Mumbai Suburban, Maharashtra, 400082; India

Information
- School type: International Curriculum {IB and CIE Private
- Motto: Nurture, Transform, Empower
- Founded: 1963
- Founder: Dr. Ramaswamy Varadarajan
- Sister school: NESISD, NESNPS
- School board: IB
- School district: Mumbai, Thane
- Principal: Dr. Ramaswamy Varadarajan
- Grades: IB PYP, IB MYP, IB DP, IGCSE, AS and A levels.
- Average class size: 20
- Student to teacher ratio: 10:1
- Education system: IB (International Baccalaureate)
- Language: English
- Schedule: 8:30 AM reporting time, 3:15 leaving time
- Hours in school day: 7 for primary, secondary and DP, 4 for pre-primary
- Classrooms: c. 60
- Campus: NESISM
- Campus size: 8 floor building
- Campus type: Urban
- Colors: Blue, Green, Red and Yellow
- Nickname: NESISM
- Team name: 4 houses, blue, green, red and yellow
- School fees: 300000 INR per academic year
- Communities served: Mulund
- Website: http://www.nesinternational.org/, http://www.nesisd.org.in/

NES International School is an IB accredited school in Mumbai, and is widely recognized among the leading schools in Mulund for its commitment to academic excellence and global education standards. It is known for its reputation as one of the best schools in Mumbai and the 3rd best school in India.

NES International School Mulund, which features amongst top international schools in Mumbai, has been an IB school since March 2009.

Dr. R Varadarajan, the founder Principal of NES International is also the secretary general of South Asia International Baccalaureate Schools Association.

The school offers the complete International Baccalaureate (IB) continuum, including the Primary Years Programme (PYP), Middle Years Programme (MYP), and Diploma Programme (DP). In addition, it provides Cambridge International pathways such as Cambridge Lower Secondary, IGCSE, and Cambridge International AS & A Levels.In a survey by Times School Survey in 2016, NES International School has been ranked as the 3rd best International school in Mumbai. In another survey by Education World, India, NES International School was ranked as the tenth best school in India in the International Day schools category NES International School was awarded The Economic Times Best School Brands Award in 2016

== Facilities ==
The school offers features like indoor cricket, indoor basketball, football adventure sports, paramilitary training, yoga and meditation. The school has psychologists and special tutors.

NES International School was amongst the international schools in Mumbai to take part in IB World’s first online assessment session in May 2016

== Activities and achievements ==
NES International School organises an annual science festival each year in collaboration with South Asian International Baccalaureate Schools Association (SAIBSA)

In 2015, a student of NES International School Mulund, Nishad Damle was honoured with the Superior Academic Achievement Award by the National Society of High School Scholars, Atlanta.

NES International is the first school with a space pavilion by ISRO and VSSC. The students of NES International were also invited to visit the ISRO centre in October 2014.
