= Mahatma Education Society =

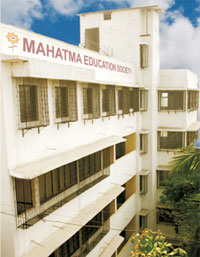
- Chembur, Mumbai; India

Information
- Established: 1970
- Chairman: Dr. K. M. Vasudevan Pillai
- Chairperson: Dr. Daphne Pillai
- Website: mes.ac.in

Mahatma Education Society is a not-for-profit trust in India that manages 48 educational institutions, including schools, colleges, and institutions of architecture, management, engineering, vocational education, and teacher training. The institutions are spread over 5 locations: Chembur, Gorai, Panvel, New Panvel, and Rasayani. These institutions serve over 30,000 students. Dr. K. M. Vasudevan Pillai is the founder and CEO of the Mahatma Education Society which employs over 2,000 teachers, many who have been trained in-house.

== Early life and education ==
Dr. K. M. Vasudevan Pillai (born 17 May 1946, in Kerala, India) is an educationist, social entrepreneur, institution-builder and philanthropist. Born into a family of agriculturists, Dr. Pillai is one of six children. To acquire an urban education, he was sent to Mumbai in 1962, at the age of sixteen. After completing his post-graduation in English Literature, he worked for a year as a lecturer of English in Somaiya Polytechnic College, Mumbai. Later, he completed his doctoral thesis on the works of the renowned English poet, William Wordsworth, traveling through the length of the Lake District to track the poet's life and sources of inspiration. In 1970, Dr. Pillai established the Chembur English High School under the aegis of the Mahatma Education Society.

== Family ==
Dr. Pillai is a long-standing resident of Chembur. In 1981 he married Dr. Daphne Pillai, a lecturer of English Literature at Jaihind College, Mumbai. Dr. Daphne Pillai later moved to Hinduja College, Mumbai, where she worked for twenty years and headed the English department. Her experience was invaluable to the Pillai Group. She is today the Secretary and Chairperson of the Management Board of the Mahatma Education Society and the Principal of the Pillai College of Arts, Commerce and Science at New Panvel, a re-accredited A-grade institution. Dr. Daphne Pillai was also the Founder of Soroptimist International, Mumbai-Chembur, and has been responsible for several initiatives for the empowerment of women, including an adult literacy drive in slums. They have three children: Dr. Priam Pillai, Ph.D. in Mechanical Engineering from the Massachusetts Institute of Technology, Boston; Dr. Minerva Pillai, Ph.D. in Mechanical Engineering from the University of Berkeley, California; and Franav Pillai, a Berkeley alumni in Economics and the brains and team leader behind Alegria-The Festival of Joy, one of the largest college cultural festivals in India.

== History ==
=== The Chembur Campus ===
The Chembur English High School began as a small shed. The fees were kept to a bare minimum to ensure affordability for all. The initial years were fraught with struggle, as Dr. Pillai served as a peon, clerk, and teacher in order to keep the school's operation financially feasible. The school grew through fund-raising initiatives. In 1981, a night junior college – among the first of its kind – was started. This was done to accommodate the working youth and raise their employment potential. Over time, the campus has been expanded to include nine institutions. These include a pre-primary school, a primary school, a secondary school, a junior college (both day and night), a night college, a Marathi medium school, a D.Ed college, and a B.Ed college, the first such institution to be set up in Mumbai. The Chembur campus is known for opening up opportunities for the underprivileged.

=== The Khanda Colony Campus, Panvel, Sector 8 ===
Given the space constraints of Mumbai, the city development planning agency CIDCO was set up to develop townships that would decongest the city. In 1990, CIDCO invited applications for four plots to be allotted to educational trusts in Panvel, a pastoral area 40 km from Mumbai. This saw the Mahatma Education Society establish the Mahatma School of Academics and Sports, and bring urban amenities and standards of teaching to a region that has barely any infrastructure. The school runs the SSc and HSC state board programmes and the national CBSE programme, for over 3,000 students. The campus also houses a college of Education (with M.Ed and Ph.D. programmes) and a college of Physical Education affiliated to the University of Mumbai.

=== The Dr. K. M. V. Pillai Campus, New Panvel, Sector 16 ===
The Dr. K.M.V. Pillai Campus houses a

1. Pillai College of Architecture
2. Pillai College of Arts, Commerce and Science
3. Pillai College of Engineering (Autonomous)
4. Pillai Institute of Management Studies and Research

The campus also offers post-graduate programs in engineering, architecture, arts, science and business, at both the Masters' and Doctoral levels.

=== The Dr. Pillai Global Academy, Gorai Campus ===
In 2005, the Mahatma Education Society set up a global academy (based on the IGCSE University of Cambridge programme and the International Baccalaureate programme) in Borivali-Gorai, which was then a semi-developed suburb. The school delivered world-class amenities and advanced teaching methodologies at locally affordable prices. Many of the ideas implemented came out of Dr. Pillai's extensive travels to countries like the U.S., Canada, Germany, Switzerland, Australia, and Singapore. The Dr. Pillai Global Academy is today the preferred standard in Borivli-Gorai, which has seen rapid development.

=== The Dr Pillai Global Academy, New Panvel, Sector 7 ===
In 2006, the Dr. Pillai Global Academy, New Panvel, was set up to deliver holistic education in line with emerging global trends. The academy offers two international curricula: IGCSE, from the University of Cambridge, UK, and the International Baccalaureate of Geneva, Switzerland.

=== The Pillai-HOC Campus, Rasayani ===
The Pillai-HOC campus, situated in the city of Rasayani, 18 km from Panvel, emerged as a unique public-private partnership when Dr. Pillai was invited to take over the decrepit school run by Hindustan Organic Chemicals Limited (HOCL), a public sector company that was financially unstable and losing money. Through a well-planned re-engineering effort, Dr. Pillai revived the school, converting it from SSC to a CBSE and HSC programme. The re-engineering entailed training of the old staff and a complete overhaul of the school building. Over the years, the Rasayani Campus has grown rapidly and is now home to an architecture college, an engineering college, a management institution, a college of arts, commerce and science, a polytechnic college, and a teacher training college. The engineering college offers post-graduate programmes at both the Masters' and Doctoral levels. The Management Institution offers MMS and PGDM courses for post graduate course.
