= Inodai Waldorf School =

Coordinates: 19.1104°N 72.8742°E

Inodai Waldorf School in Andheri East, Mumbai, India, is based on the Waldorf curriculum. It was established in 2011 by the Education of Emancipation Trust.

The Steiner Waldorf curriculum is holistic and spans the age range from 3–18 years. It places emphasis on integrating nature, art, crafts, drama and music into all academic learning including science & mathematics. It addresses all the multiple intelligences, including emotional literacy and kinesthetic learning.

In addition to developing analytical, logical and reasoning skills as education has always done, it focuses on the development of imagination, creativity, memory and flexible thinking skills.

The Steiner curriculum is based on understanding the development of a child and how children learn at different ages. It encourages the development of each child's sense of truth, beauty, and goodness, and inspires in each child a lifelong love of learning.

== See also ==
- Waldorf education
