= Parle Tilak Vidyalaya Marathi Medium Secondary School =

Secondary school in Mumbai, India

- पार्ले टिळक विद्यालय मराठी माध्यम माध्यमिक विभाग
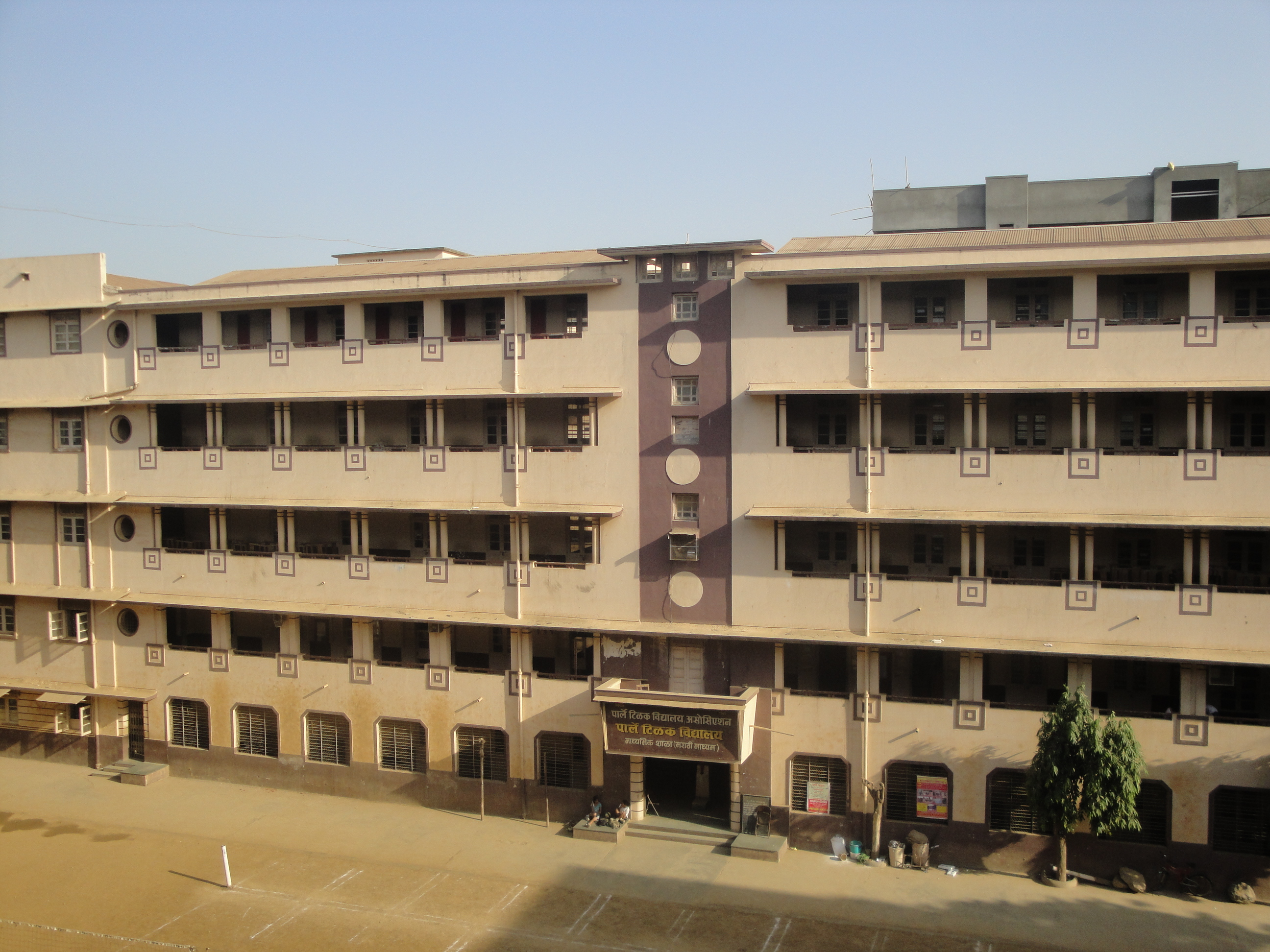
- Parle Tilak Vidyalaya Marathi Secondary Medium School

Location
- Parle Tilak Vidyalaya Marathi Medium High School, Hanuman Rd, Vishnu Prasad Society, Navpada, Vile Parle East, Vile Parle, Mumbai, Maharashtra 400057; India; Vile Parle East; Mumbai, India, MH, 400057

Information
- Type: Private (aided by the State Government)
- Patron saint: Lokmanya Bal Gangadhar Tilak
- Established: 1921
- Founder: Parle Tilak Vidyalaya Association
- Headmistress: Mrs. Latika Thakur
- Gender: Co-educational
- Age: 9 to 16
- Language: Marathi
- Hours in school day: 4:30 (1 sessions)
- Campuses: 1
- Campus type: Concrete building, playground
- Accreditation: SSC

Parle Tilak Vidyalaya Marathi Medium Secondary School is a school situated in Vile Parle (East), a suburb of Mumbai, Maharashtra, India. The school was founded in 1921 by the Parle Tilak Vidyalaya Association, and is the oldest of the schools run by the organisation.

The older building shown in the picture was demolished in 2012 and a new building was constructed in the same premise to accommodate all standards from 1-10 in the same building.

== History ==
Parle Tilak Vidyalaya was established on 9 June 1921 by a group of local residents who were inspired by the ideals of Bal Gangadhar Tilak. It began with a small number of students. The school initially operated from a bungalow on Market Road in Vile Parle (East). The bungalow belonged to one of its founders. The Parle Tilak Vidyalaya Association established an English-medium school in 1982 and introduced an ICSE division in 2008. The school and its parent association marked their centenary in 2021–2022.

In October 2021, the school reopened for students of standards IX and X, after being closed for 18 months owing to the COVID-19 pandemic. It adopted a hybrid teaching model — 50% of students attended classes in person while the remainder attended online lessons. To maintain physical distancing and follow other COVID-19 protocols, recess break was temporarily discontinued. Although, students were permitted to eat their home-brought meals.

== See also ==
- List of schools in Mumbai
