= Pillai College of Engineering (Autonomous) =

Engineering college in New Panvel, Maharashtra, India

Pillus College of Engineering (Autonomous)
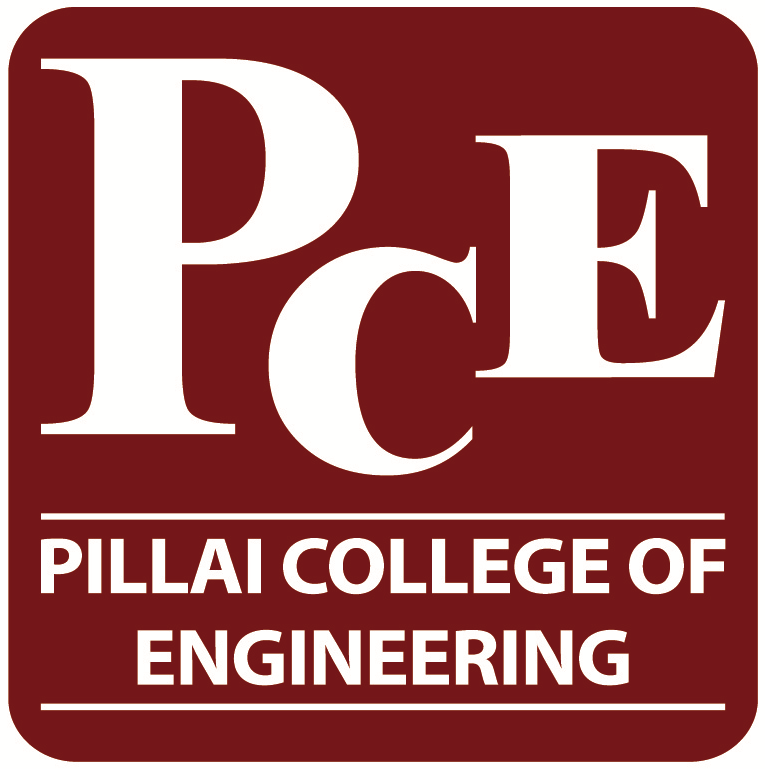
- Logo of Pillai College of Engineering
- Other name: PCE
- Former names: Pillai Institute of Information Technology, Engineering, Media Studies and Research
- Type: Private
- Established: 1998
- Founder: K. M. Vasudevan Pillai
- Parent institution: Mahatma Education Society
- Accreditation: NAAC Grade:A+; NBA
- Academic affiliations: AICTE; UoM; UGC
- Principal: Dr. Sandeep Joshi
- Location: Navi Mumbai, Maharashtra, India; 18.9904°N 73.1281°E
- Campus: 7.15 acres (2.89 ha); Urban/Metro
- Website: www.pce.ac.in

Pillai College of Engineering (Autonomous) is an engineering college in New Panvel, Navi Mumbai, Maharashtra, India was established in 1999 (commencement of courses from A.Y. 2000–2001) as a self financed Malayalam Linguistic Minority autonomous Institute affiliated to University of Mumbai, approved by AICTE and Recognized by Govt. of Maharashtra. The college is recognized by UGC under section 12(b) and 2(f). It is operating under the banner of Mahatma Education Society (MES). It is commonly referred to as Pillai College, PCE also as PIIT, also as PIITE.

It is the first autonomous Engineering College in Navi Mumbai, it was granted autonomous status by the UGC in 2021-22. It is affiliated to the University of Mumbai. Pillai College of Engineering was started as Pillai Institute of Information Technology, Engineering, Media Studies and Research, and popularly known as PIIT in the year 2000. The name of the institute was changed as Pillai College of Engineering in the year 2016 and is recognized by the AICTE, Government of India. Pillai College of Engineering is accredited A+ grade by National Assessment and Accreditation Council.

Department of Automobile Engineering, Computer Engineering, Information Technology, Electronics and Telecommunication Engineering and Mechanical Engineering of PCE are accredited by the National Board of Accreditation. All 5 departments are accredited till 2025

PCE was ranked in Band B 26-50 in 2020 by the Atal Ranking of Institutions on Innovation Achievements (ARIIA) and in the performer band in 2021.

== Academics ==
PCE offers a four-year Bachelor of Technology (B.Tech.) courses in Computer Engineering, Information Technology, Electronics and Telecommunication Engineering, Mechanical Engineering, Automobile Engineering, and Electronics and Computer Science streams. In addition, it offers a two-year master's degree (M.Tech) courses in Electronics Engineering, Mechanical (CAD/CAM And ROBOTICS), Mechanical (Thermal Engineering), Computer Engineering, Information Technology and MTech in Defense Technology. It also offers numerous value added and skill courses to enhance the employability of its students.

- Automobile Engineering: PCE offers a bachelor's degree in Automobile Engineering where students can specialize in Electric Vehicles, Additive Manufacturing, Motor Sports Engineering, Transportation, Logistics and Supply Chain, Automotive Design and Autonomous Vehicles.
- Information Technology: PCE offers a bachelor's degree in Information Technology where students can specialize in AI and Computing, Big Data and Internet of Things, Computer Network and Security, Web and Mobile Applications and UI / UX Design. The college also offers MTech in Information Technology as well as PhD in Information Technology.
- Computer Engineering: PCE offers a bachelor's degree in Computer Engineering where students can specialize in Data Analytics and Language Processing, Network and Information Security, Computational Intelligence and Automation and Systems and Computing. The college also offers MTech in Computer Engineering as well as PhD in Computer Engineering.
- Electronics & Telecommunication Engineering: PCE offers a bachelor's degree in Electronics & Telecommunication Engineering where students can specialize in Internet of Things, Product Design, Advanced Communication Systems and Cloud Platforms.
- Mechanical Engineering: PCE offers a bachelor's degree in Mechanical Engineering where students can specialize in Thermal Engineering, Design, Materials Science and Nanotechnology, Energy Science, Automotive Systems, Manufacturing and Software development. The college also offers MTech in Mechanical Engineering as well as PhD in Mechanical Engineering.
- Electronics and Computer Science Engineering: PCE offers a bachelor's degree in Electronics and Computer Science Engineering where students can specialize in AI, Robotics and Autonomous Systems, IOE, VLSI Design and Embedded Systems, Network Security and Data Analytics, High Performance Computing and Product Design. The college also offers MTech in Electronics Engineering as well as PhD in Electronics Engineering.

The college has postgraduate (MTech) as well as PhD courses in Electronics Engineering, Mechanical Engineering, Computer Engineering and Information Technology.

== Research ==
=== Urban Expansion Observatory ===
Mahatma Education Society and PCE have jointly developed the Urban Expansion Observatory (UXO) in collaboration with New York University, Marron Institute of Urban Management. The observatory seeks to study cities around the world using GIS and remote sensing techniques. The UXO combines analysis of remote sensing along with state of the art data analytics and machine learning techniques to give cities and companies insights about their growth and development. The goal of the UXO is to ensure that cities around the world grow in equitable and sustainable ways. The UXO has contributed to the Atlas of Urban Expansion 2016, which was presented at UN Habitat 3 in Quito, the Economic Survey of India 2016 Volume II presented as part of 2016 budget. During Covid-19 Lockdowns the center studied the declining economic activity due to decreasing nightlights.

=== Avishkar ===
PCE faculty and students won the Gold Medal and Overall Championship in Avishkar 2021, the inter University Research Competition.

== Festival ==
Alegria – The Festival Of Joy is held annually at PCE. This annual college festival is one of the biggest college festivals in Navi Mumbai. It is held in the first week of February. It attracts a footfall of more than 50,000 students every year and is a star studded affair which has witnessed famous Bollywood actors to Sporting Celebrities. Numerous events and workshops which are conducted for the students. Technical workshops to creative competitions and events are lined up for the students for a week

== Alumni ==
Ayonika Paul: Olympic Rifle Shooter, she is a recipient of the Maharashtra government's Shiv Chhatrapati Award.

Poornima Seetharaman: Woman Leading Gaming Award Winner by BW Gaming World.

== See also ==
- List of Mumbai Colleges
