= St. Xavier's High School, Vile Parle =

Catholic school in Vile Parle West, Mumbai

St. Xavier's High School and Junior College

Location
- Church Road, Vile Parle West; Mumbai, Maharashtra, 400056; India; 19.099377°N 72.842586°E

Information
- Religious affiliation: Christianity
- Denomination: Roman Catholic
- School board: Maharashtra State Board of Secondary and Higher Secondary Education
- Principal: Rev.Fr. Denzil Fernandes (Admin)
- Affiliation: Maharashtra State Board of Secondary and Higher Secondary Education

St. Xavier's High School & Junior College, formerly called St. Xavier's High School, is a Catholic school located in the Mumbai Suburban district in Vile Parle West.

The school & Junior College caters to pupils from kindergarten up to class 12 and the medium of instruction is the English language. The school is affiliated to the Maharashtra State Board of Secondary and Higher Secondary Education, Pune, which conducts the annual Board Exams namely the Secondary School Certificate (SSC) examinations and the Higher Secondary School Certificate (HSC) examinations at the close of class 10 and class 12 respectively.

== History ==
It is generally believed that the school started functioning in the early 1890s, some claim it started in 1837 under a banyan tree that fell due to heavy winds and rains on 6 June 2020 inside the educational institution's campus.
