= K. M. Vasudevan Pillai =

Indian businessman

Dr. K. M. Vasudevan Pillai
- Born: 17 May 1946 (age 80); Kerala
- Occupations: Indian educationist, social entrepreneur, institution-builder, and philanthropist
- Known for: Founder and CEO of the Mahatma Education Society
- Notable work: The author of book EduNation: The Dream of an India Empowered
- Spouse: Dr. Daphne Pillai
- Children: Dr. Priam Pillai; Dr. Minerva Pillai; Franav Pillai
- Website: Dr. K. M. Vasudevan Pillai

K. M. Vasudevan Pillai (born 17 May 1946 in Kerala, India) is an Indian educationist, social entrepreneur, institution-builder, and philanthropist. He is the founder and CEO of the Mahatma Education Society, a not-for-profit trust that manages 48 educational institutions, from schools and colleges to institutions of architecture, management, engineering, vocational education, and teacher training. The institutions are spread over five locations (Chembur, Gorai, Panvel, New Panvel, and Rasayani) and serve over 30,000 students. The Mahatma Education Society employs over 2000 teachers, many who have been trained in-house.

== Early life and education ==
Pillai is one of six children. To acquire an urban education, he was sent to Mumbai in 1962, at the age of sixteen. After completing his post-graduation in English Literature, he worked for a year as a lecturer of English in Somaiya Polytechnic College, Mumbai. Later, he completed his doctoral thesis on the works of the renowned English poet, William Wordsworth, traveling through the length of the Lake District to track the poet's life and sources of inspiration. In 1970, Pillai established the Chembur English High School under the aegis of the Mahatma Education Society .

== Family ==
Pillai is a long-standing resident of Chembur. In 1981 he married Dr. Daphne Pillai, a lecturer of English literature at Jaihind College Mumbai. Daphne Pillai was also the Founder President of Soroptimist International, Mumbai-Chembur, and has been responsible for several initiatives for the empowerment of women, including an adult literacy drive in slums.

== Achievements ==
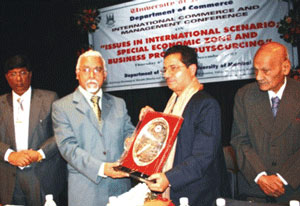
Dr. K. M. Vasudevan Pillai, Founder, chairman and CEO of Mahatma Education Society was felicitated on 6 December 2007 by the then Dr. Vijay Khole, Vice Chancellor of University of Mumbai for his contributions to social and institutional engineering in education.

- Pillai is the founder of the Dr. Pillai Global Academies in Gorai and Panvel. They are international schools that offer the International Baccalaureate Diploma Programme and the University of Cambridge schooling programmes. The schools have won many accolades for their state of art of infrastructure and innovative teaching methodologies.
- He is also the Chairman of Erudite Education Mission, a non-profit organization that fulfills the CSR objectives of the group.
- In 2006, Pillai started an international management exchange programme with St. Mary's College of Business & Economics, California, with a view to expose students to global advancements in management.
- In April 2010, he was part of a high-level national delegation to the BRIC-IBSA Summit in Rio de Janeiro, Brazil.

== Publications ==
Dr. Pillai is the author of Edunation: The Dream of an India Empowered, a book that offers insights into what can be done to transform India's education sector. The book is an exhaustive reference point for policy-makers, institution-builders, teachers and educators.
