= Utpal Shanghvi Global School =

Private school in Mumbai, India

Location
- J.V.P.D, Juhu, Mumbai; 19.1121237°N 72.8285123°E

Information
- Founded: 1982
- Founder: Juhu Parle Education Society
- Principal: Rakhi Mukherjee
- Houses: Bluebells, Daffodills, Roses, Shamrocks
- Website: www.ppsijc.org/index.aspx

Utpal Shanghvi Global School (USGS) is a private school in J.V.P.D Scheme area of, Juhu, Mumbai, India. The school follows the SSC state board syllabus, Cambridge University certified IGCSE syllabus and the International Baccalaureate PYP programme. In 1994, the school was first in India to get ISO 9001 certification.

== Foundation ==
Utpal Shanghvi Global School is managed by Juhu Parle Education Society and started in June 1982, with pre-primary and primary divisions following the Maharashtra state board. The secondary section of the school commenced the following year in June 1983. The curriculum of International General Certificate of Secondary Education (IGCSE) developed by Cambridge International Examinations (CIE) and the International Baccalaureate PYP programme was introduced in 2005 and 2022 respectively.

== Extra-curricular activities ==
The school celebrates its annual function day, Blitzing, in December every year. In 2017, around 3000 people, being the school's staff, students, and their parents, arranged and participated in a cleanliness drive on Children's Day supporting the Swachh Bharat Abhiyan. Various students of the school have represented in sports competitions on state, national and international levels in table tennis, badminton, judo, and football.

== Ranking ==
The school became the first Indian school to receive ISO 9001 certification in 1994. In 2011, student Payoshaa Shah received the Dr Manmohan Singh Scholarship. It also received the International School Award by British Council for 2015–16. The school has been ranked as 8th and 6th in the Mumbai Western suburbs region by Hindustan Times in the years 2016 and 2017 respectively. In 2019, around 23% students of the 170 who appeared for the International General Certificate of Secondary Education secured above 90% marks. The principal of school, Rakhi Mukherjee, noted that the school's average was 84% marks in the IGCSE exams and that all students first class and above. Reports of students securing top ranks in IGCSE exams have been covered in national level newspapers.

== Notable alumni and faculty ==
Alumni

- Aditya Narayan, singer, actor, TV show host (former child actor and son of singer Udit Narayan)
- Shriya Pilgaonkar, actress
- Vatsal Sheth, actor
- Pushtiie, actor
- Adhyayan Suman, actor (son of actor Shekhar Suman )

Faculty

- Jyoti Gauba, teacher turned actress, taught mathematics at school.

== See also ==
- List of schools in Mumbai
