= Rasayani =

Village in Maharashtra

- Industrial Town
- Location in Maharashtra, India Rasayani (India)
- Coordinates: 18.8930808°N 73.1577873°E
- Country: India
- State: Maharashtra
- District: Taluka Khalapur Raigad

Government
  - Body: Gram Panchayats

Area
  - Total: 10.44 km^{2} (4.03 sq mi)
- Demonym: Rasayanikar

Languages
  - Official: Marathi
- Time zone: UTC+5:30 (IST)
- PIN: 410207/410222
- Telephone code: 2192
- Vehicle registration: MH-46
- Lok Sabha constituency: Maval
- Vidhan Sabha constituency: Karjat
- Civic agency: Gram Panchayats
- Website: maharashtra.gov.in

Rasayani is a town in the Khalapur taluka of the Raigad district, Maharashtra, India. It is 64 km from Mumbai and 100 km from Pune. Its district headquarters are in Alibag, 50 km away.

Bharat Petroleum Corporation Limited, a Public Sector Undertaking, has started a POL depot in Rasayani. It is a BPCL's pipeline project from Mumbai Refinery to Rasayani, that is expected to develop the region.
