= New Panvel =

New Panvel (नवे पनवेल)
- Node of Navi Mumbai
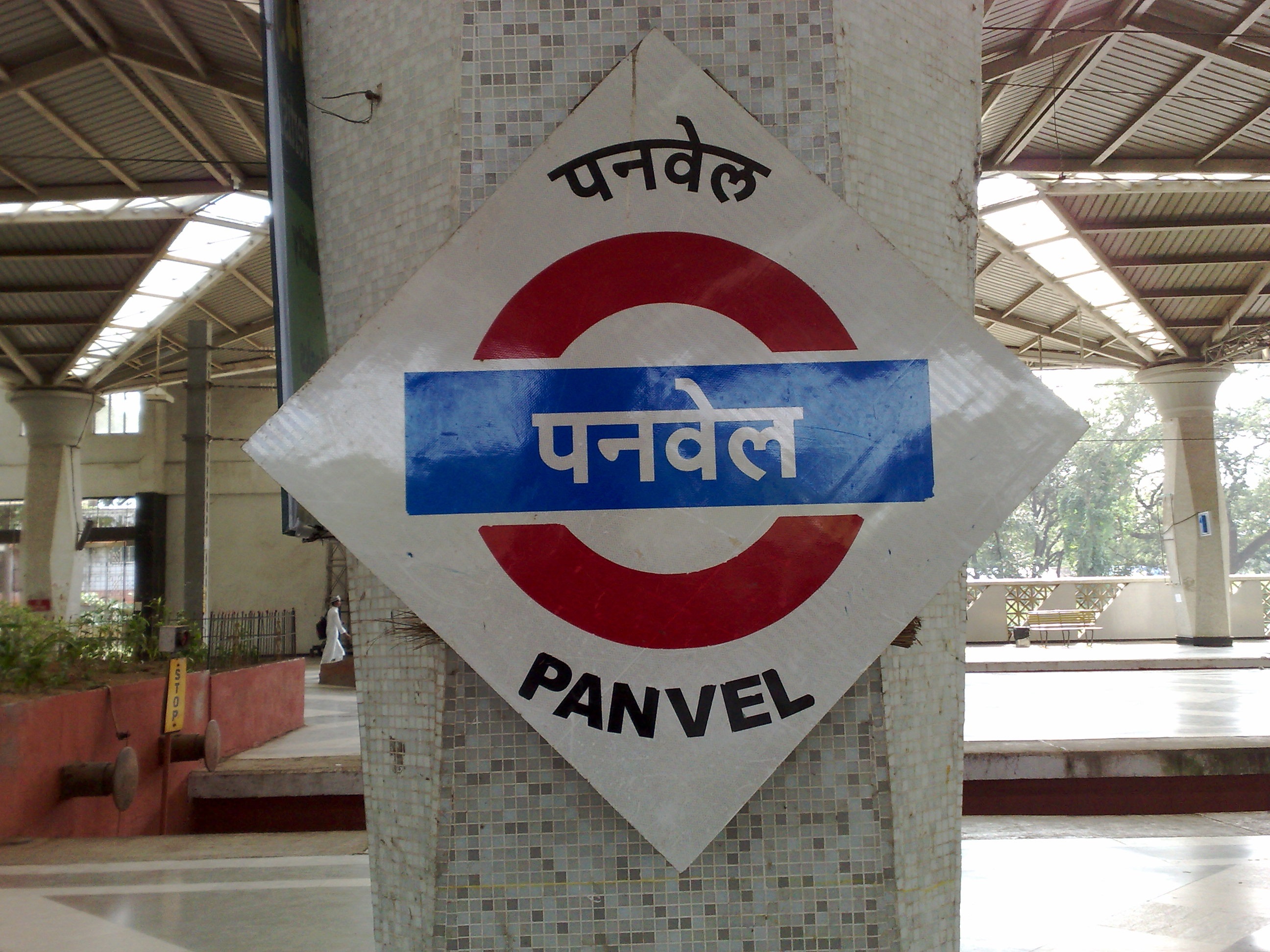
- Panvel Station

- Location within Mumbai
- Coordinates: 18.98°N 73.1°E
- Country: India
- State: Maharashtra
- City: Navi Mumbai
- District: Raigad
- Metro: Mumbai
- Nearest City: Old Panvel; Kharghar; Thane
- Established: 1980
- Founder: City and Industrial Development Corporation (CIDCO)

Area
  - Total: 24 km^{2} (9.3 sq mi)
- Elevation: 3.52 m (11.5 ft)

Population (2005)
  - Total: 3.5 Lakhs
  - Density: 15,644/km^{2} (40,520/sq mi)

Languages
  - Official: Marathi
- Time zone: UTC+5:30 (IST)
- PIN: 410206
- Telephone code: 022
- Vehicle registration: MH-46
- Civic agency: Panvel Municipal Corporation
- Climate: Humid, monsoon, Tropical (Köppen)

New Panvel (Navé Panvel / मराठी: नवे पनवेल) is a residential, commercial and educational node of Navi Mumbai, Raigad District, Maharashtra and comes under the Konkan division. New Panvel was developed on marshy land and was previously a Mango cultivated area.

== Education ==
- Pillai College of Engineering (Autonomous) - Navé Panvel (E)
- Mahatma School of Academics and Sports - Navé Panvel (W)
