= Hansraj Morarji Public School =

Location
- Mumbai, Maharashtra; India
- 19.1220953°N 72.832454°E

Information
- Opened: 1939
- Gender: co-education
- Language: English
- Website: bkhm.edu.in//

Hansraj Morarji Public School is a combined primary, junior and senior school in Mumbai, India. It was founded in 1939 by the Bai Kabibai and Hansraj Morarji Trust. The foundation stone was laid by Sardar Patel. The school was earlier an all-boys school but now admits girls.

== Affiliation ==
The school prepares students for Secondary Certificate Examinations (SSCs) held by the Mumbai Divisional Board of the Maharashtra State Board of Secondary and Higher Secondary Education. In addition to curriculum subjects, there are also clubs covering Maths, Drama. There is also The Green Brigade Club, which is the school's Environment Club and which won the "Green School Award" in 1996.

The lady founder of the school was anxious that traditional Indian values should be instilled in the students. She was also wary of the English language, viewing it as being the vehicle of westernization and loss of cultural values. Therefore, in the articles of association of the school, she made it compulsory to offer Gujarati as a medium of instruction. One section of every class, from first to tenth standards, was for the Gujarati medium and students were taught all subjects in that language. From the time of its founding until the early 2000s, this system prevailed. However, due to lack of demand (presumably), the Gujarati medium-of-instruction classes have now been discontinued and the school has become a completely English Medium School.

== Campus ==
The school campus of around 50 acres (20 ha) is located at the foot of Gilbert Hill. The campus has Rajhans Vidyalaya a CBSE affiliated senior secondary school, and Bai Kabibai Balvatika the feeder pre-primary school for Hansraj and Rajhans. The school has a cricket ground, basketball courts, football ground, tennis courts and gymnasium. It has a School Wellness Clinic called AYAKSHA for the school student's health and routine checkup. An audio-visual room for screening educational films is also present. The HMP School is a member of Indian Public School Conference (IPSC).

The school started a Junior college in July 2008. The college provides Science and Commerce based streams along with vocational course for Information Technology.

== Notable alumni ==
- A. M. Naik, industrialist, CEO of Larsen & Toubro Ltd. Also, his father was a teacher at HMPS.
- Viren J. Shah of Mukund Ltd., industrialist and governor of West Bengal (1999-2004)
- Ketan Desai, former president of Medical Council of India and World Medical Association
- Amole Gupte, Bollywood screenwriter
- Arvind Trivedi, stage and television actor
- Upendra Trivedi, film and stage actor and director
- Harish Bhimani, voice artist, writer
- Rahul Vaidya, singer
- Chandrakant Pandit, national-level cricketer and cricket coach
- Shivam Dube, India cricketer
