= International School Award =

Educational Awards

The International School Award is a British Council accreditation scheme which rewards those schools having notable global element in their curriculum. There are three entry points for schools which are enlisted as:

- Intermediate
- Accreditation
- Foundation

The scheme began in 1999 and since then, over 1,000 International School Awards have been granted. School re-accreditation is required every three years.
