= Sardar Patel College of Engineering =

Autonomous engineering college in Mumbai, India

- Motto: अमृतं तु विद्या (Knowledge is Nectar)
- Type: Government
- Established: 1962
- Principal: Dr. M. M. Murudi
- Undergraduates: 1680
- Location: Andheri, Mumbai, Maharashtra, India
- Campus: Metropolitan- 47 acres
- Website: spce.ac.in
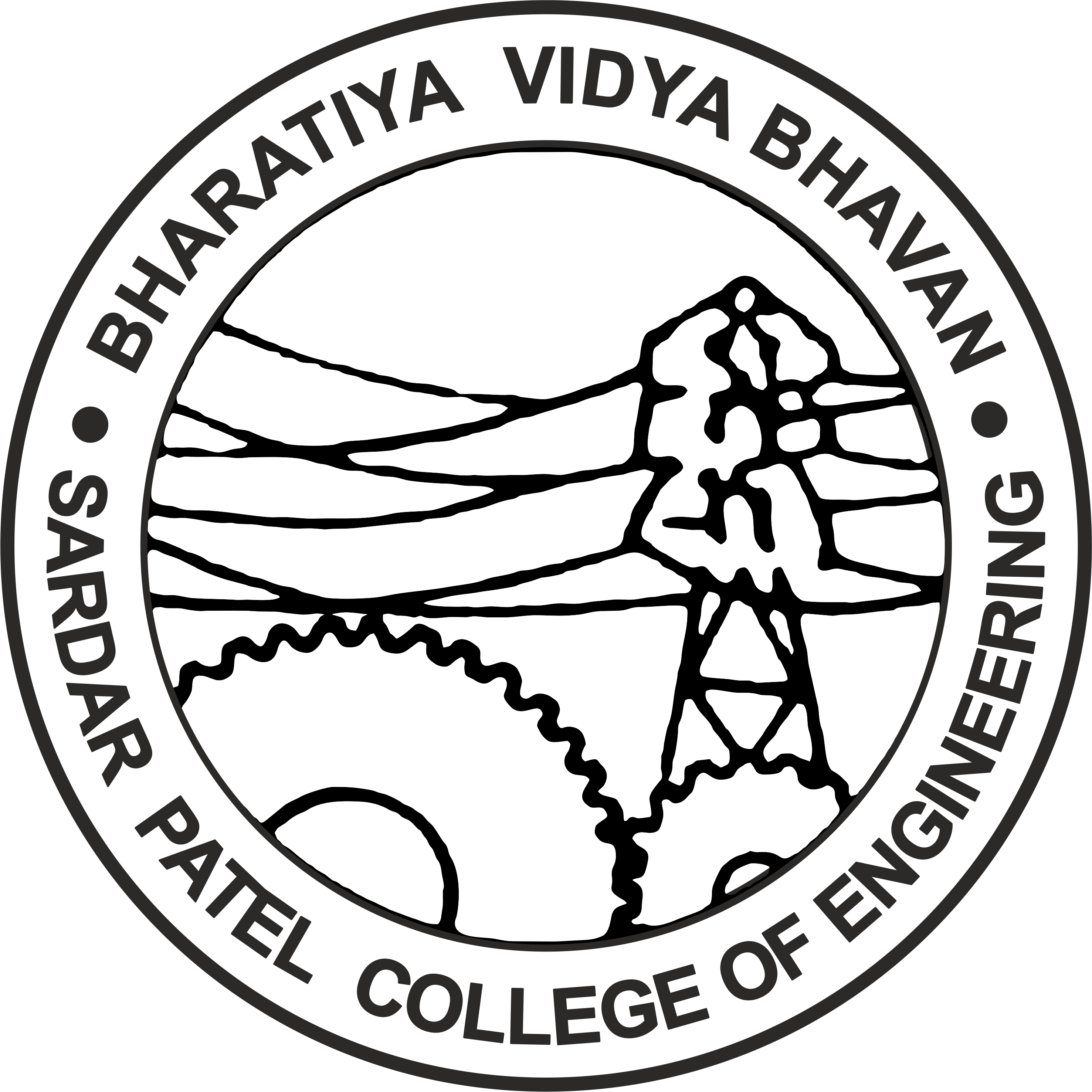

Sardar Patel College of Engineering (SPCE) is a government-aided autonomous engineering college located in Mumbai, India. It is affiliated to the University of Mumbai and offers undergraduate (Bachelor) and graduate (Master) degrees in engineering. It is one of the few Mumbai University affiliated colleges that have received Grade 'A' rating from the Government of Maharashtra. The college is supported by government funds, and was granted autonomous status by the UGC in June 2010.

The students and alumni of college are colloquially referred to as SPCEians.

== History ==
The college was founded in 1961 as a government-aided engineering college by Kulapati Dr. K. M. Munshi under the management of the Bhartiya Vidya Bhavan. The foundation stone of the college was laid on 17 September 1961 by Yashwantrao Chavan, who was then the Chief Minister of Maharashtra. The college was inaugurated by the first Prime Minister of India Jawaharlal Nehru in 1962. The college is dedicated to Sardar Vallabhbhai Patel, an eminent nation builder of independent India.

The college started with courses in civil, electrical and mechanical engineering with an initial intake of 40 in each branch that was subsequently increased to 60. At the time, it was only the fifth engineering institute in the Bombay region after Veermata Jijabai Technological Institute, University Department of Chemical Technology, IIT Bombay and M. H. Saboo Siddik College of Engineering. The institute introduced its first post-graduate course, a Masters of Engineering (Civil) with structural engineering subjects, in 1988 with aid from the Ministry of Human Resource Development. Subsequently, a post-graduate program in mechanical engineering disciplines was also introduced.

The college is autonomous and affiliated to the University of Mumbai for its full-time degree, post graduate, and research programs. The institute is a recognised PhD and QIP center and it is one of the TEQIP-II & TEQIP-III institutes.

The University of Mumbai recognised the college as two separate institutions - SPCE (Aided) offering Civil, Mechanical and Electrical engineering courses and SPCE (Unaided - now a separate institute called SPIT) offering Computer Engineering, Electronics & Information Technology courses. The university desired that these self-financed courses be separated and housed in a separate building and developed as a separate self-financed entity. Thus, in 2005-06 the unaided wing was formally separated from its parent college and established as Sardar Patel Institute of Technology (SPIT).

== Campus ==
The college is located in Bhartiya Vidya Bhavan's lush green campus at Munshi Nagar, Andheri (West), Mumbai- 400058. The campus has a bank extension (Indian Bank), a lake and a botanical garden, Lord Shiva Temple, Bhavan's Adventure Park, greenery everywhere.

The college is at about 2 km from Andheri Railway Station. And also about 7–8 km from Chhatrapati Shivaji International Airport (CSIA), Mumbai.

The college is also at 2 minutes walkable distance from Azad Nagar Metro Station

The college shares its campus with

SP Jain Institute Of Management And Research

Sardar Patel Institute of Technology

Bhavans College

A.H.Wadia Highschool

== Departments ==
- Department Of Civil Engineering
- Department Of Structural Engineering
- Department Of Mechanical Engineering
- Department Of Electrical Engineering

== Academics ==
=== Academic programmes ===
The college offers full-time courses in civil, mechanical and electrical engineering. Recently, the college has been granted permission to conduct PhD course in civil and mechanical engineering. Courses offered include:

- Bachelor of Technology (Civil)
- Bachelor of Technology (Mechanical)
- Bachelor of Technology (Electrical)
- Master of Technology (Civil) Construction Management
- Master of Technology (Civil) Structural Engineering
- Master of Technology (Mechanical) Thermal Engineering
- Master of Technology (Mechanical) Machine Design
- Master of Technology (Electrical) Power Electronics & Power Systems
- PhD Civil
- PhD Mechanical

=== Ranking ===
The college was ranked 25th in a 2016 survey of Indian engineering institutes conducted by i3 Research Consultants and published by The Times Group.

== Student life ==
=== College magazine ===
The first magazine of the college was titled Sukarma. Today an annual college magazine named DISHA (meaning "direction") is produced. It includes reports on the activities that have taken place in the college throughout the year, as well as articles and photographs. A newsletter named Communication Times is also run by the IETE committee.

=== College festivals & Events ===
SPACE - Sardar Patel Annual Cultural Extravaganza

SPCE hosts its annual cultural festival named SPACE in February or March. It started in the year 1983.

SPECTRA

SPCE hosts its annual technical event named SPECTRA in February or March.

SPCE CUP

It is the annual sports event of SPCE which is organised every year in September.

PRARAMBH

PRARAMBH is the freshers party event to welcome the dearest freshers (first year students). It is organised in August.

SPIRIT

The sports committee of the college organises an annual state-level sports festival "SPIRIT".

SPPL - Sardar Patel Premier League

SPCE along with SPIT organise cricket tournament every year in the month of March–April, started in 2010. It also one of the biggest sports event in campus.

SPCE Annual Debate Competition

College also organises open annual debate competition started in 2009.

Ganeshotsava

Ganeshotsava is annually organised by students of SPCE Boys Hostel in hostel.

=== Hostel Facility ===
Hostel Facility is available and the institute is presently trying to cope with the need to accommodate the increasing number of female students. The hostel intake is currently about 36 students per branch. Around 350 students stay in the boys' hostel.

=== Student associations ===
SPeakers' Club

The Speakers' Club of SPCE is a club which trains the budding orators. It helps them to improve their delivery. Teaches them how to write speeches. The Speakers' Club is also responsible to train students on how to participate in group discussions, debates, extempores, MUNs etc

Student Council

College hosts student council which has different posts for students (only for third year students) with one faculty as a head of council. All events and other activities are conducted by student council. The posts for students are

General Secretary, Literary Secretary, Cultural Secretary, Sports Secretary, Technical Secretary, Magazine Secretary, Finance Secretary, Ladies Representative

Each department in college also have their own student committees. They organise guest lectures, seminars for students. They also organise other activities such as trekking, treasure hunt, industrial visits, their own sports events known as CEA CUP, MESA CUP, EESA CUP, etc.

CEA Committee

Civil Engineers Association is the department committee of students of civil engineering with one faculty of department as head.

MESA Committee

Mechanical Engineering Students Association is the department committee of students of mechanical engineering with one faculty of department as head.

EESA Committee

Electrical Engineering Students Association is the department committee of students of electrical engineering with one faculty of department as head.

ISHRAE

Indian Society of Heating, Refigerating and Air Conditioning Engineers

SPCE START-UP CELL

SPCE Start-Up Cell was established in January 2018 as a mandate from AICTE in Sardar Patel College of Engineering in order to develop a vibrant and ideal entrepreneurial ecosystem in the institute. The main objective of this cell is to build entrepreneurial culture, to support student innovations, to identify entrepreneurial potential of students and transform them into start-up entrepreneurs.

TESA COMMITTEE

Thermal Engineering Students Association is an academic forum of students of Mechanical Engineering Department, SPCE, was incepted on 30/10/2017 at SPCE Seminar Hall. Vision and Mission of TESA-SPCE is constant involvement of students, through participation and practice, in exploration of knowledge of Mechanical Engineering and allied multidisciplinary domains.

SPCE MUN

SPCE MUN is a conference in which the participants simulate the proceedings of the United Nations to discuss, debate and formulate to the most complex and enthralling international issues.
