= List of international schools in India =

The following are notable international schools in India. Such schools follow an international curriculum (such as International Baccalaureate, Edexcel, International General Certificate of Secondary Education (IGCSE) or Cambridge Assessment International Education) or they follow a specific national curriculum different from curricula common to India.

== National chains ==
- Delhi Public School Society
- Indus Trust
- Ryan International Group of Institutions
- VIBGYOR Group of Schools

== Andhra Pradesh ==
- Greenfield International School - Kakinada
- Oakridge International School - Visakhapatnam

== Delhi ==
- American Embassy School, New Delhi
- The British School, New Delhi
- German School, New Delhi
- Japanese School, New Delhi
- Lycée Français International de Delhi
- Russian Embassy School in Delhi

=== New Delhi ===
- The Mother's International School
- Tagore International School

== Gujarat ==
- Ashadeep International School, Surat
- Udgam School For Children

== Haryana ==
- Heritage Xperiential Learning School, Gurgaon
- Lancers International School
- Meenakshi World School
- Vidya Sanskar International School

== Karnataka ==
=== Bangalore ===
- Bangalore International School
- Candor International School
- Canadian International School
- Greenwood High International School
- The International School, Bangalore
- Inventure Academy
- Jain Heritage School
- Mallya Aditi International School
- Oakridge International School
- Stonehill International School
- Trio World Academy
- Vidyashilp Academy

=== Mangalore ===
- Cambridge School
- Canara High School
- Podar International School
- Presidency School

== Kerala ==
=== Kochi ===
- Charter School (Kerala, India)

=== Trivandrum ===
- Christ Nagar School, Thiruvananthapuram
- The Oxford School
- Trivandrum International School

== Maharashtra ==
- Singapore International School
- Victorious Kidss Educares

=== Mumbai ===
- American School of Bombay
- Avalon Heights International School
- BD Somani International School
- CP Goenka International School
- Dhirubhai Ambani International School
- École Mondiale World School
- Edubridge International School
- Lycée Français International de Mumbai
- Islamic International School
- Japanese School of Mumbai
- JBCN International School
- Mount Litera School International
- NES International School
- Oberoi International School
- Podar International School
- Singapore International School
- Utpal Shanghvi Global School

=== Pune ===
- UWC Mahindra

== Odisha ==
- KIIT International School – Bhubaneswar
- SAI International School – Bhubaneswar

== Punjab ==
- Oakridge International School - Mohali

== Rajasthan ==
=== Jaipur ===
- Neerja Modi School

== Tamil Nadu ==
- Good Shepherd International School, Ooty
- Hebron School
- Kodaikanal International School

=== Chennai ===
- Akshar Árbol International School
- École Franco-Indienne Sishya
- German International School, Chennai
- Islamic International School
- Lalaji Memorial Omega International School

== Telangana ==
=== Hyderabad ===
- Aga Khan Academy
- CHIREC International
- Glendale Academy
- The Hyderabad Public School, Begumpet
- International School of Hyderabad
- Oakridge International School

== Uttar Pradesh ==
- City Montessori School
- Laurels International School

== Uttarakhand ==
- Ecole Globale International Girls' School
- Woodstock School

== West Bengal ==
=== Kolkata ===
- Calcutta International School
- Oaktree International School, Kolkata

== See also ==
- List of schools in India
- List of international schools
- List of boarding schools in India
