= List of boarding schools in India =

The following are notable boarding schools in India.

== Andhra Pradesh ==
- Oakridge International School – Visakhapatnam
- Rishi Valley School - Madanapalle
- The Peepal Grove School – Gongivari Palli

== Delhi and NCR ==
- The British Co-Ed High School – Patiala
- Cambridge School Srinivaspuri – Delhi
- Col. Satsangi's Kiran Memorial Public School - Delhi
- Lancers International school - Gurugram

== Gujarat ==
- Rajkumar College – Rajkot
- Sainik School, Balachadi - Balachadi

== Haryana ==
- Gita Niketan Awasiya Vidyalaya – Kurukshetra
- Modern Vidya Niketan schools – Faridabad
- Motilal Nehru School of Sports Rai, ( MNSS) Sonipat
- Vidya Sanskar International School – Faridabad

== Himachal Pradesh ==
- Army Public School, Dagshai – Solan
- Bishop Cotton School – Shimla
- Chail Military School – Chail
- Lawrence School, Sanawar
- Sainik School, Sujanpur Tihra

== Jharkhand ==
- Netarhat Residential School – Netarhat
- Ramakrishna Mission Vidyapith – Deoghar
- Vikas Vidyalaya – Ranchi

== Karnataka ==
- Baldwin Boys' High School – Bangalore
- Bangalore Military School – Bangalore
- Belgaum Military School – Belgaum
- Canadian International School – Bengaluru
- Candor International School – Bangalore
- Greenwood High International School – Bangalore
- Jain Heritage School – Bangalore
- Trio World Academy – Bangalore

== Kerala ==
- Loyola School, Thiruvananthapuram
- Sainik School Kazhakootam - Thiruvananthapuram
- St. Thomas School, Thiruvananthapuram

== Maharashtra ==
- Barnes School – Devlali, Nasik
- B K Birla Centre For Education - near Pune
- Shri Shivaji Preparatory Military School (Pune)
- Singapore International School, Mumbai
- UWC Mahindra – near Pune

== Madhya Pradesh ==
- Daly College - Indore
- Sainik School, Rewa
- Scindia School - Gwalior
- Scindia Kanya Vidyalaya - Gwalior

== Odisha ==
- KIIT International School – Bhubaneswar

== Rajasthan ==
- Ajmer Military School – Ajmer
- Birla School Pilani
- Heritage Girls School – Udaipur, Rajasthan
- Maharani Gayatri Devi Girls' Public School (MGD) – Jaipur
- Mayo College – Ajmer
- Mayo College Girls School – Ajmer
- Neerja Modi School – Jaipur
- Rashtriya Military School, Dholpur

== Tamil Nadu ==
- Campion Anglo-Indian Higher Secondary School – Tiruchirapalli
- Chinmaya International Residential School – Siruvani, Coimbatore
- Good Shepherd International School – Ooty
- Hebron School – Ooty
- Kodaikanal International School – Kodaikanal
- Laidlaw Memorial School and Junior College, The – Ketti
- Lawrence School, Lovedale – Ooty
- Sainik School, Amaravathinagar – Udumalpet, Tirupur

== Telangana ==
- Aga Khan Academy – Hyderabad
- The Hyderabad Public School, Begumpet – Hyderabad
- Walden's Path – Hyderabad

== Uttar Pradesh ==
- La Martinière College - Lucknow
- Vardhman Academy – Meerut

== Uttarakhand ==
- The Aryan School – Dehradun
- The Asian School – Dehradun
- Birla Vidya Mandir – Nainital
- Colonel Brown Cambridge School – Dehradun
- Convent of Jesus and Mary – Mussoorie
- The Doon School – Dehradun
- Ecole Globale International Girls' School – Dehradun
- G. D. Birla Memorial School – Ranikhet
- Oak Grove School – Mussoorie
- Rashtriya Indian Military College – Dehradun
- St. George's College - Mussoorie
- St Joseph's College – Nainital
- St. Mary's Convent High School – Nainital
- SelaQui International School – Dehradun
- Sherwood College – Nainital
- Unison World School – Dehradun
- Welham Boys' School – Dehradun
- Welham Girls' School – Dehradun
- Woodstock School – Mussoorie
- Wynberg Allen School – Mussoorie

== West Bengal ==
- Dr. Graham's Homes, Kalimpong
- Goethals Memorial School – Kurseong
- Sainik School, Purulia
- St. Joseph's School, Darjeeling
- St. Paul's School, Darjeeling

== Multiple locations ==
- La Martinière College
  - La Martinière Calcutta
  - La Martinière College, Lucknow

== See also ==
- Delhi Public School Society
- List of schools in India
- List of boarding schools
- List of international schools in India
