= List of schools in Rajasthan =

State of Rajasthan in India's map.

This is a District-wise list of schools in the Indian state of Rajasthan.

== Ajmer district ==
- Ajmer Military School
- Mayo College
- Mayo College Girls School

== Bikaner district ==
- Army Public School

== Chittorgarh district ==
- Atomic Energy Central School, Rawatbhata

== Jaipur district ==
- Imam Rabbani Senior Secondary Public School
- Jayshree Periwal High School
- Maharani Gayatri Devi Girls' Public School
- Neerja Modi School
- Rajasthan State Open School
- St. Anselm's Pink City Sr. Sec. School
- St. Xavier's School

== Jhunjhunu district ==
- Birla Senior Secondary School, Pilani
- Sainik School, Jhunjhunu

== Jodhpur district ==
- Air Force School
- Chopasni Senior Secondary School
- St. Anne's School

== Others ==
- Delhi Public School, Pali
- Heritage Girls School, Udaipur
- Lakshmipat Singhania Academy, Churu
- PM Shri Government Senior Secondary School Kawai, Kawai
- Rajkumari Ratnavati Girls School, Jaisalmer
- Rashtriya Military School, Dholpur
- St. Xavier's School, Behror
