= Spring Buds International Preschool =

- Juhu, Lamington Road, Thane, Oshiwara, Kandivali, Borivali, IC Colony (Borivali West), Wagholi (Pune); Mumbai, Thane, Pune, Maharashtra; India

Information
- Type: International Preschool
- Established: 2000
- Founder: Sandeep Goenka; Archana Goenka
- Authority: C P Goenka International Group of Schools
- Grades: Playgroup, Nursery, Junior KG, Senior KG
- Language: English
- Campus type: Urban
- Website: Official website

The Spring Buds International Preschool is a chain of schools run by C P Goenka International Group of Schools based in Mumbai, India. It has branches in Juhu, Lamington Road, Thane, Pune - Wagholi, Oshiwara, Kandivali, Borivali and IC Colony -Borivali West.

== History ==
The school was founded by Sandeep Goenka and Archana Goenka and it is a part of C P Goenka International Group of Schools. The school is run by the Citizens Welfare Association, a Mumbai-based public trust registered under the Bombay Public Trust Act, 1950, which also owns and manages the C.P. Goenka International Schools and Swami Vivekanand International Schools in Maharashtra, India.

== Facilities ==
Spring Buds International Preschool has air-conditioned classrooms, CCTV surveillance, reading zone, sand and water play, computer lab, play area, soft gym, AV room and pantry.

== Awards and recognition ==
- Spring Buds Preschool, Pune was listed among the top 5 preschools in Pune by EducationWorld magazine in 2015. It was ranked #2 on the infrastructure parameter.
- Spring Buds International Preschool's Lamington Road campus was ranked #20 in India, #4 in Maharashtra and #3 in Mumbai in the list of Top Preschools of India by Education Today in 2016.
- Spring Buds International was awarded the Best preschool in Mumbai by World Education Summit and Awards 2018.
- It ranked among Mumbai's top-ranked preschools at the Education World India School Rankings (EWISR) in 2015. The Juhu campus of Spring Buds International Preschool was ranked 9th, Lamington Road was 15th while the one in Borivali was 20th in the Pan-Mumbai rankings.

== See also ==
- List of schools in Mumbai
- List of international schools in India
