= CP Goenka International School =

Private school in Maharashtra, India

C P Goenka International School
- Juhu, Oshiwara, Borivali, Thane, Wagholi; Mumbai, Thane, Pune, Maharashtra; India

Information
- Type: Private
- Established: 2000
- Founder: Sandeep Goenka; Archana Goenka
- Authority: C P Goenka International Group of Schools
- Chairman: Sandeep Goenka
- Grades: K-12
- Gender: Co-educational
- Language: English
- Campus type: Urban
- Affiliation: International General Certificate of Secondary Education (IGCSE); Cambridge Assessment International Education (CAIE); Central Board of Secondary Education (CBSE); Indian Certificate of Secondary Education (ICSE); IB Diploma Programme (IBDP)
- Website: www.cpgoenkainternationalschool.com

The C P Goenka International School (abbreviated CPGIS) is a private, co-educational day school, with several campuses in and around Mumbai and other locations in the state of Maharashtra, India. The school is affiliated with the International General Certificate of Secondary Education (IGCSE), Central Board of Secondary Education (CBSE), Indian Certificate of Secondary Education (ICSE) and IB Diploma Programme (IBDP).

== Early history ==
CPGIS was established by Sandeep Goenka and Archana Goenka in 2000. It is affiliated with the C P Goenka International Group of Schools, which also owns Swami Vivekanand International School and Spring Buds International Preschool. The school is operated by the Citizens Welfare Association, a public trust registered under the Bombay Public Trust Act, 1950.

== Academics ==
C P Goenka International School has been authorized to offer a combination of the following programmes: International General Certificate of Secondary Education (IGCSE), Central Board of Secondary Education (CBSE), Indian Certificate of Secondary Education (ICSE) and IB Diploma Programme (IBDP) across its 5 campuses.

Campus	Board
Juhu, Mumbai	IGCSE, CAIE
Oshiwara, Mumbai	IGCSE, CAIE, IBDP
Borivali, Mumbai	CBSE, IGCSE, CAIE
Thane	IGCSE, CAIE, ICSE
Wagholi, Pune	IGCSE, CAIE, CBSE

== Community engagement ==
In February 2019 the CPGIS Wagholi campus organized a blood donation camp in association with the Army Hospital, Pune.

The CPGIS Borivali campus participated in a cleanup drive at Versova Beach, Mumbai in September 2019.

== Awards and recognitions ==
- In a survey by Times School Survey in 2018, CPGIS Juhu campus was ranked as the 3rd best International school in Mumbai in Zone B for International Curriculum.
- CPGIS Thane campus was rated #4 for goodwill, legacy, and reputation and #7 for academic excellence in a list of India's Top School Ranking, 2018: North Mumbai by the Elets' Digital Learning (DL) Ranking.
- The school has been listed in the Ultimate Schools of Mumbai by Hindustan Times.
- CPGIS won the Teaching Excellence Award at International School Awards 2019, held in Dubai.
- The school was ranked among the top five international schools in Mumbai at the GTF (Global Triumph Foundation) World Summit 2019.

== See also ==
- List of schools in Maharashtra
- List of schools in Mumbai
- List of international schools in India
