= Presidency (disambiguation) =

Presidency refers to the executive branch of a nation's government under a President.

Presidency may also refer to:

- Presidency of the Council of the European Union
- Lay presidency at the Eucharist
- Presidency (Pakistan), is the official residence and the principal workplace of the President of Pakistan
- Presidencies of British India; one of the following four former subdivisions of the British Empire in India:
  - Bengal Presidency (Presidency of Fort William)
  - Bombay Presidency
  - Madras Presidency (Presidency of Fort St. George)
  - Penang Presidency (part of Bengal Presidency from 1786 to 1805 and again from 1830 to 1867)
- Presidency division, an existing division of West Bengal, India
- Presidency College; one of the following colleges in India (named after the Presidencies they were instituted in):
  - Presidency College, Chennai
  - Presidency College, Kolkata
- Presidency University, Bangladesh
- Presidency School, in Bangalore
- Bosnian Presidency

== See also ==
- First Presidency, Latter Day Saint movement
  - First Presidency (LDS Church)
