= The Charter School =

The Charter School may refer to:

- The Charter School East Dulwich, London, England, UK
- The Charter School North Dulwich, London, England, UK
- The Charter School (Kerala, India), Kochi, Kerala, India
- The Charter School of Wilmington, Wilmington, Delaware, United States

== See also ==
- Charter school, schools that receive government funding but operate independently of the established state school system
