= Kawai (disambiguation) =

Kawai Musical Instruments is a Japanese musical instrument manufacturing company.

Kawai may also refer to:

== Places ==
- Kawai, Gifu, a former village in Japan now part of Hida, Gifu
- Kawai, Iwate, a former village in Japan
- Kawai, Nara, a town in Nara Prefecture, Japan
- Kawai, Myanmar, a village in Hkamti Township, in the Sagaing Region
- Kawai Station (Ibaraki), a railway station on the Suigun Line operated by East Japan Railway Company
- Kawai Station (Tokyo), a railway station in Tokyo operated by the East Japan Railway Company
- Kawai Point, a jutting headland on the island of Kauai in the Hawaiian Islands
- Kawai, Rajasthan, a town in Rajasthan, India

== People ==
- Kawai (name), a Japanese surname and feminine given name, including notable people with the name

== See also ==
- Kawaii, Japanese word for "cute"
- Kawhi Leonard, American professional basketball player
- Kauai, one of the Hawaiian Islands
