= 可愛 =

可愛, literally 'cute, adorable, loveable', may refer to:

- Kawai (disambiguation), the Japanese transliteration
- Ke'ai, the Chinese transliteration
  - Ke'ai Village (可爱村), Da'an Township, Huanjiang Maonan Autonomous County, Guangxi, China
  - Zhang Ke'ai (张可爱), a character in Singapore television drama 118
