= École Mondiale World School =

Private international school in Mumbai

- Juhu, Mumbai

Information
- Type: Private
- Established: 2004; 22 years ago
- Principal: Dr Alka Goel (2025-present)
- Grades: Nursery / KG – I / KG – II, Grade 1-10, Grade 11-12
- Website: www.ecolemondiale.org

The École Mondiale World School is an accredited International Baccalaureate (IB) school in Mumbai in the primary, middle years and diploma courses. It also offers the International General Certificate of Secondary Education (IGCSE) at year 10 levels through Cambridge International Examinations, the International Division of the University of Cambridge Local Examinations Syndicate.

The school opened in 2004 and is one of five IB World Schools in Mumbai and 18 in India.

== Allegations ==
In 2011, a parent of École Mondiale World School's students in Juhu alleged that her children were expelled by the school as she was late by 18 days in paying their annual fees. She also claimed that she had to pay an extra 10 lakh for re-admitting her children.

== See also ==
- List of international schools in India
- The Scindia School, Gwalior
- The Doon School, Dehradun
- Mayo College, Ajmer
- Scindia Kanya Vidyalaya, Gwalior
- Authority control
