= JBCN International School =

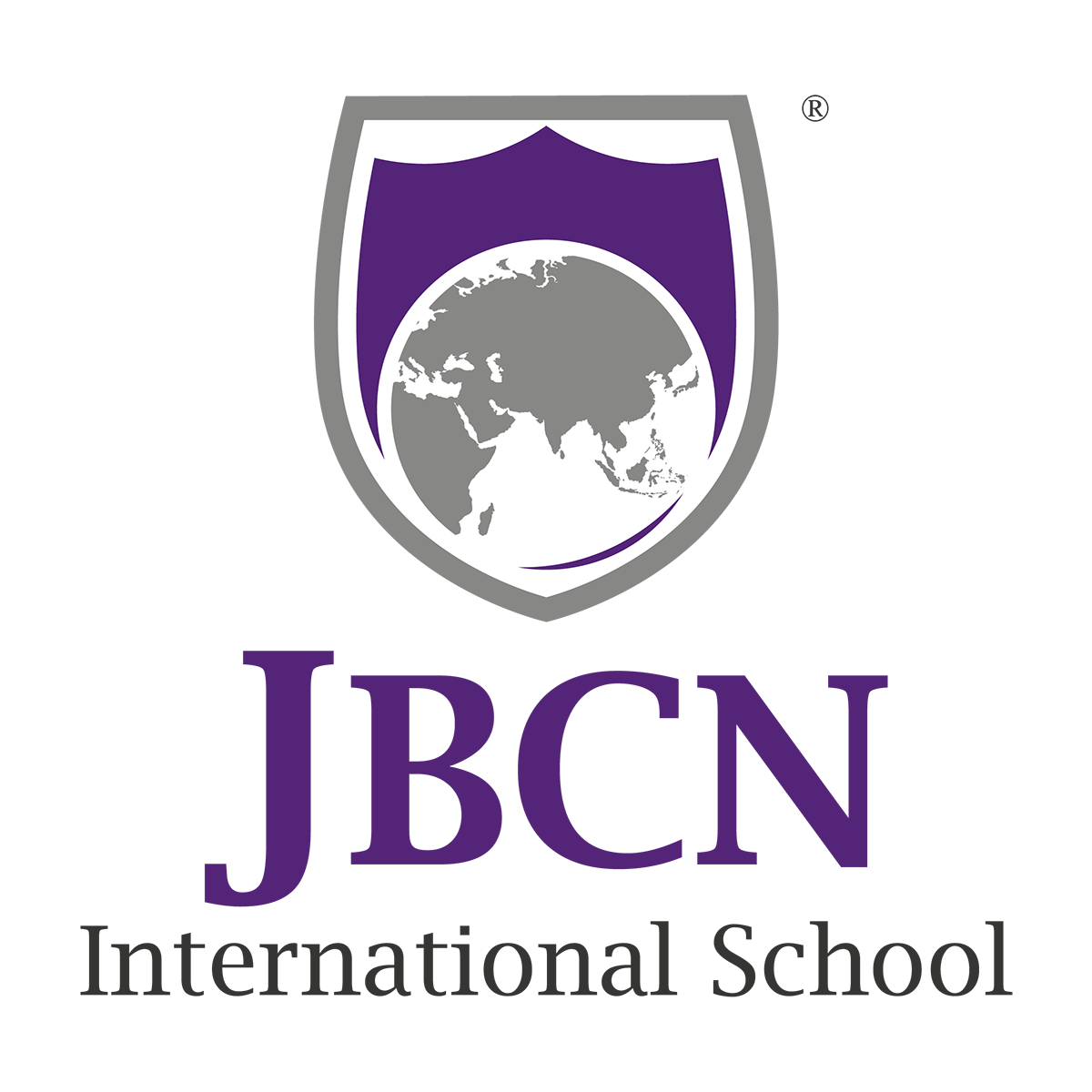
- Mumbai, Maharashtra; India

Information
- Type: Private
- Established: 1984
- Founder: Pinky Dalal
- School board: IBDP
- School district: Mumbai
- Authority: JBCN Education Group
- Director: Kunal Dalal
- Grades: K-12
- Language: English
- Campus type: Urban
- Affiliation: Cambridge Assessment International Education (CAIE); Council for the Indian School Certificate Examinations (CISCE); International Baccalaureate (IB)
- Website: www.jbcnschool.edu.in

JBCN International School is a group of private, co-educational day schools, in Mumbai, India. The group operates five campuses - in Borivali, Parel, Oshiwara, Chembur, and Mulund -and is affiliated with the International Baccalaureate (IB), Cambridge Assessment International Education (CAIE) and Council for the Indian School Certificate Examinations (CISCE). The schools are managed by JBCN Education Group.

== History ==
The origins of JBCN Education trace back to 1984, when Pinky Dalal launched a preschool called Children's Nook in Gamdevi, South Mumbai. In 2003, Pinky Dalal and her son Kunal Dalal co-founded JBCN Education with the objective of providing academic consulting and management services to schools and eventually set up their own group of schools.

The group's first international school campus became operational in 2009 at Borivali. The Parel campus was established in 2011, offering the International Baccalaureate Primary Years Programme (IB-PYP) and Cambridge IGCSE. Further campuses opened in Oshiwara in 2013, Chembur in 2019, and Mulund in 2024.

== Campuses ==
=== JBCN International School, Borivali ===
The Borivali campus was the group's first international school, located in Borivali West. It offers Cambridge Primary, ICSE, and Cambridge IGCSE. The campus was described by Afternoon DC as the first "eco-friendly school" in Mumbai's western suburbs. In 2025, the campus hosted the Inter-School Sports Organisation (ISSO) Under-14 Cricket Tournament.

=== JBCN International School, Parel ===
The Parel campus was established in 2011 and is located in Parel East, South Mumbai. It offers IB-PYP, Cambridge IGCSE, and the IB Diploma Programme (IBDP) from nursery through Grade 12. The campus incorporates a co-curricular programme spanning creative arts, sports, and real-world learning experiences. In the 2023-24 Cambridge IGCSE examinations, three students from the campus received Cambridge Outstanding Learner Awards: Leaisha Patil and Nivaan Punamiya each achieved Top in the World for Mathematics (Without Coursework), and Aarav Kshitij Chaudhary achieved second place in India in the Best Across Eight category.

=== JBCN International School, Oshiwara ===
The Oshiwara campus is located in Andheri West and offers IB-PYP, Cambridge IGCSE, and IBDP or Cambridge A Levels from pre-primary through Grade 12. The campus integrates technology across classroom instruction and incorporates leadership training and co-curricular activities in sports, theatre, and creative arts. In 2024, the campus was included in a list of top 50 IB schools globally compiled by Education Advisers Limited (UK), as reported by Business Standard.

=== JBCN International School, Chembur ===
The Chembur campus was established in 2019 and offers IB-PYP, Cambridge IGCSE, and IBDP. It has been listed among notable schools in the Chembur area by The Times of India. The campus operates a programme called iPROPEL, designed to support student development alongside the standard curriculum.

=== JBCN International School, Mulund ===
The Mulund campus opened in 2024 and is the group's primary ICSE-focused campus. It offers Cambridge Primary, ICSE, Cambridge Lower Secondary, IGCSE, and A Levels. The campus uses assessments as tools for student development and incorporates experiential learning within its curriculum.

== Academic Programmes ==
JBCN International School offers curricula based on the Cambridge Assessment International Education (CAIE), International Baccalaureate (IB), Indian Certificate of Secondary Education (ICSE) and Council for the Indian School Certificate Examinations (CISCE) frameworks. Specific offerings vary by campus.

Stage	Grades	Programme	Description
Pre-Primary	Pre-Nursery - Senior Kindergarten	Internal Programme	Conceptual learning designed to build readiness for the IB-PYP and Cambridge Primary programmes.
Primary	Grades I - V	IB Primary Years Programme (IB-PYP) / Cambridge Primary	Inquiry-based programme focusing on the development of knowledge, skills, and attitudes across subject areas.
Secondary	Grades VI - X	Cambridge Lower Secondary, Cambridge IGCSE / ICSE	Application-based curriculum providing preparation for higher education.
Senior School	Grades XI - XII	IB Diploma Programme (IBDP) / Cambridge A Levels	Internationally recognised pre-university programmes emphasising critical thinking and in-depth subject knowledge.

ICSE is offered at the Borivali and Mulund campuses. The IB Diploma Programme is available at the Parel, Oshiwara, and Chembur campuses.

=== Campus wise details ===
JBCN International School's Branch	Primary	Secondary	Higher secondary
JBCN International School, Borivali	Cambridge Primary (CP)	ICSE & IGCSE	AS and A level
JBCN International School, Oshiwara	Primary Years Programme (PYP)	IGCSE	IBDP
JBCN International School, Parel	Primary Years Programme (PYP)	IGCSE	IBDP
JBCN International School, Chembur	Primary Years Programme (PYP)	IGCSE	IBDP
JBCN International School, Mulund	Cambridge Primary (CP)	ICSE & IGCSE	

== Facilities ==
JBCN campuses include dedicated learning zones alongside standard classroom facilities. These include an Innovation Lab, Science and Technology Lab, Learner Resource Centre, Self Expression Zone, Discovery and Sensory Zone, Physical Education Zone, Auditorium, Swimming Pool, Astroturf, and Sports Ground. Classrooms are designed with breakout zones intended to support collaborative and inquiry-based learning.

Classrooms feature reading books, flexible seating and child safety features.

== University Placements ==
According to Mid-Day's article, JBCN's graduating Class of 2025 received university offers spanning 19 countries, with scholarships exceeding USD 13 million. Institutions mentioned include MIT, Stanford University, Cornell University, the University of Oxford, the University of Cambridge, Johns Hopkins University, Imperial College London, and University College London, among others. The same article also reported that Parel and Oshiwara campus students achieved an average IB Diploma Programme score of 37.4, against a global average of 30.8.

== IB School Rankings ==
In 2024/2025 rankings compiled by Education Advisers Limited (UK), based on IB Diploma Programme average scores, the Parel and Oshiwara campuses were both listed among the top 40 IB schools globally. The Oshiwara campus had also appeared on the same organisation's top 50 list in 2024.

== Recognition ==
- In 2025, JBCN Education Group received dual recognition at the ET Education Annual Education Excellence Awards, organised by The Economic Times, in the categories of K-12 excellence and preschool excellence.
- In 2025, JBCN was recognised at the BW Businessworld Top Education Brands Summit & Awards.
- In 2024–25, Kunal Dalal, Managing Director of JBCN Education, was recognised as Education Leader of the Year at the EducationWorld India School Ranking Awards.
- JBCN Oshiwara was cited in a 2022 report stating that 20% of Maharashtra's best educators teach at the campus, as recognised by a survey conducted by Uniapply supported by The Times of India.
- JBCN Education has received the Great Place to Work certification for three consecutive years.

== Mid-Day Education School Survey 2025 ==
The Mid-Day Education School Survey 2025, ranked JBCN campuses across multiple categories in its Mumbai city-wide and zone-level surveys.

=== City-wide rankings ===
Campus	Category	Rank
JBCN International School, Parel	International Baccalaureate / Cambridge Curriculum/ International Curriculum	1
JBCN International School, Oshiwara	International Curriculum	2
JBCN International School, Oshiwara	International Baccalaureate	3
JBCN International School, Oshiwara	Cambridge Curriculum	4
JBCN International School, Borivali	National + International Curriculum	1
JBCN International School, Borivali	National Curriculum – ICSE	3
JBCN International School, Chembur	Cambridge Curriculum	6
JBCN International School, Chembur	International Baccalaureate/ International Curriculum	5
JBCN International School, Mulund	Emerging – Cambridge Curriculum	Listed

=== Zone-level rankings (Rank 1) ===
- JBCN International School, Parel - Ranked 1st in Cambridge Curriculum, International Baccalaureate, and International Curriculum in Zones A and B
- JBCN International School, Oshiwara - Ranked 1st in Cambridge Curriculum, International Baccalaureate, and International Curriculum in Zone C
- JBCN International School, Borivali - Ranked 1st in Cambridge Curriculum, National + International Curriculum, and National Curriculum (ICSE) in Zones E and G
- JBCN International School, Chembur - Ranked 1st in Cambridge Curriculum, International Baccalaureate, and International Curriculum in Zone H

== Times School Survey 2025 ==
The Times School Survey 2025, published by the Times Group, ranked JBCN campuses across multiple categories in its Mumbai city-wide and zone-level surveys.

Campus	Category	City Rank	Zone Rank
JBCN International School, Parel	International Curriculum	2	1 (Zone B)
JBCN International School, Oshiwara	International Curriculum	5	2 (Zone D)
JBCN International School, Borivali	National + International Curriculum	2	1 (Zone G)
JBCN International School, Chembur	International Curriculum Emerging	Listed	
JBCN International School, Mulund	National + International Curriculum Emerging	Listed	

== See also ==
- International Baccalaureate
- Cambridge Assessment International Education
- Council for the Indian School Certificate Examinations
- List of International Schools in India
- List of schools in Mumbai
- List of schools in Maharashtra
- Rakesh Jhunjhunwala
