= Gongivaripalli =

- Village
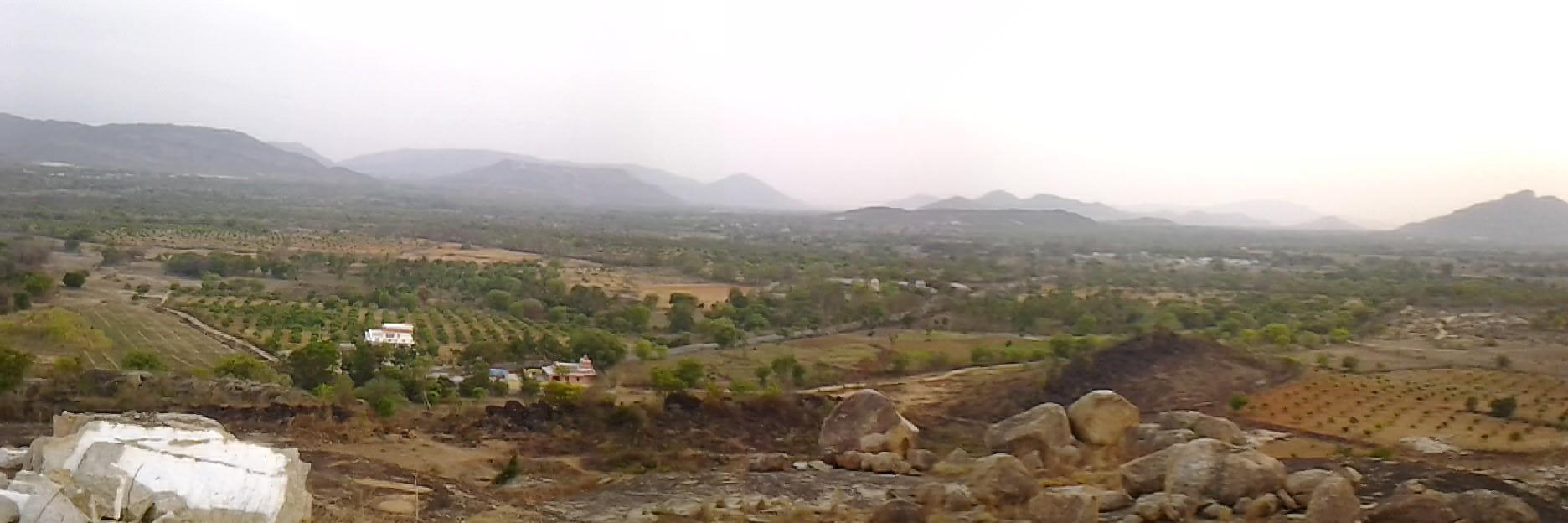
- Aerial view of Gongivaripalli seen from Seethamma Gutta.
- Interactive map of Gongivaripalli
- Location in Andhra Pradesh, India Gongivaripalli (India)
- Coordinates: 13°32′00″N 78°52′50″E
- Country: India
- State: Andhra Pradesh
- District: Annamayya

Languages
  - Official: Telugu
- Time zone: UTC+5:30 (IST)
- PIN: 517123

Gongivaripalli is a village (with a gram panchayat) located at a distance of around 3 kilometers from Sodam, Annamayya district, Andhra Pradesh. The village comes under Punganur constituency. The village is known to have a renowned international school The Peepal Grove School. Honorable ex-president of India, Dr.A.P.J.Abdul Kalam participated in the inauguration of this school.

== Image gallery ==
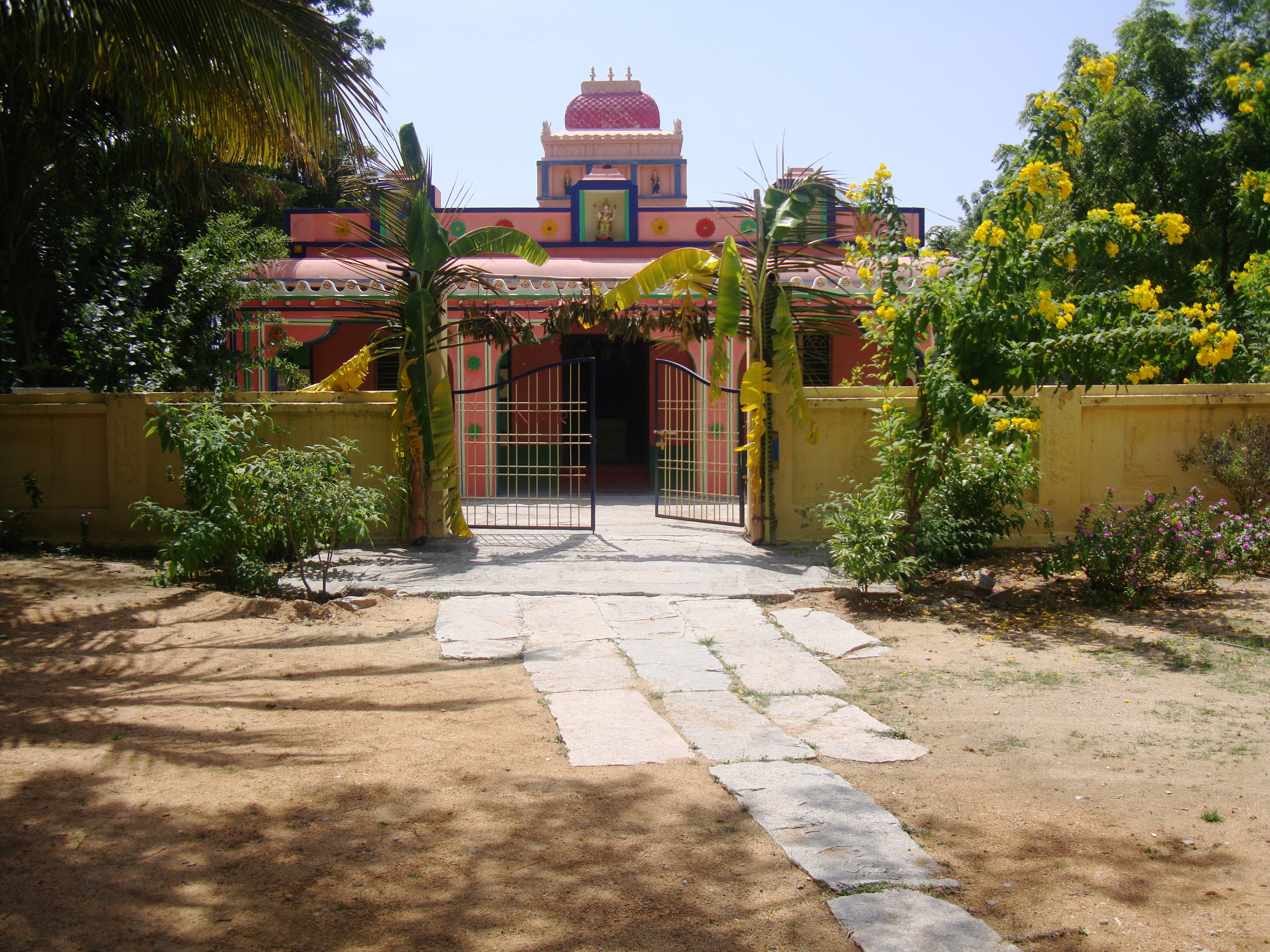
Shri Ganapathi temple in Seethamma Gutta

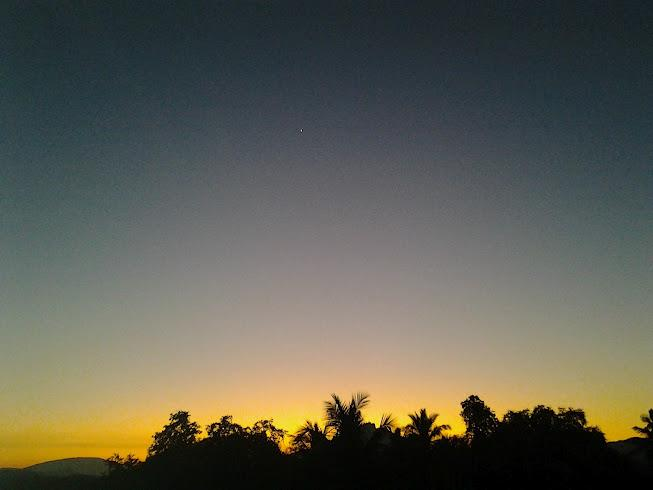
Sunset observed with a star

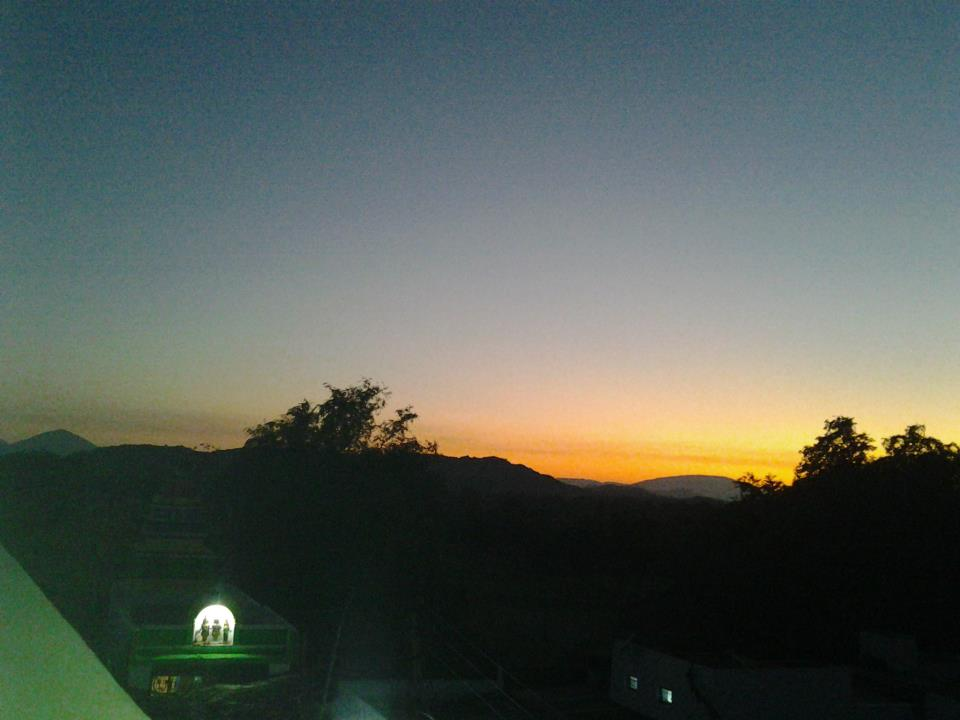
Sunset with Srirama Temple

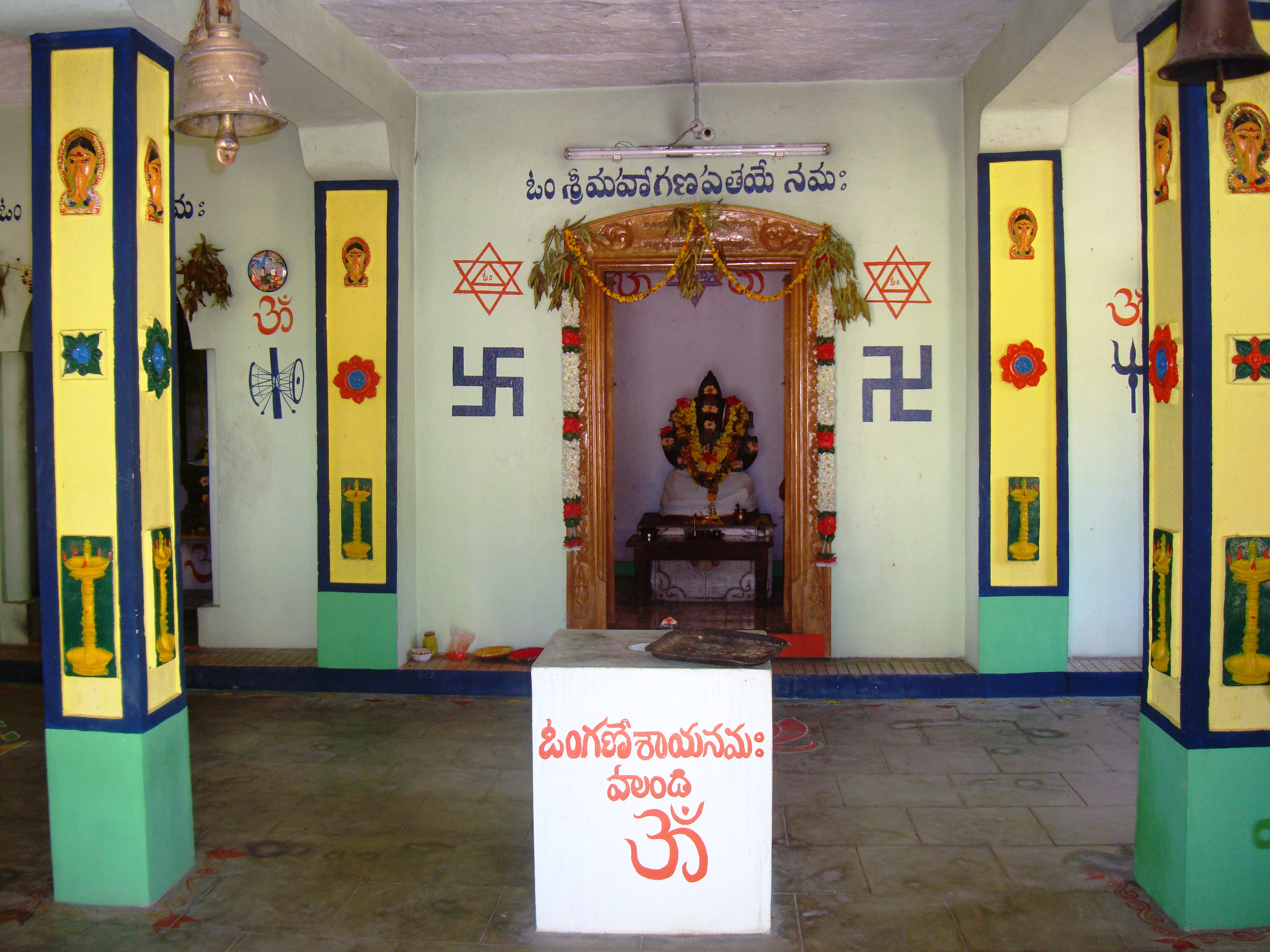
Shri Vinayaka Temple inner view

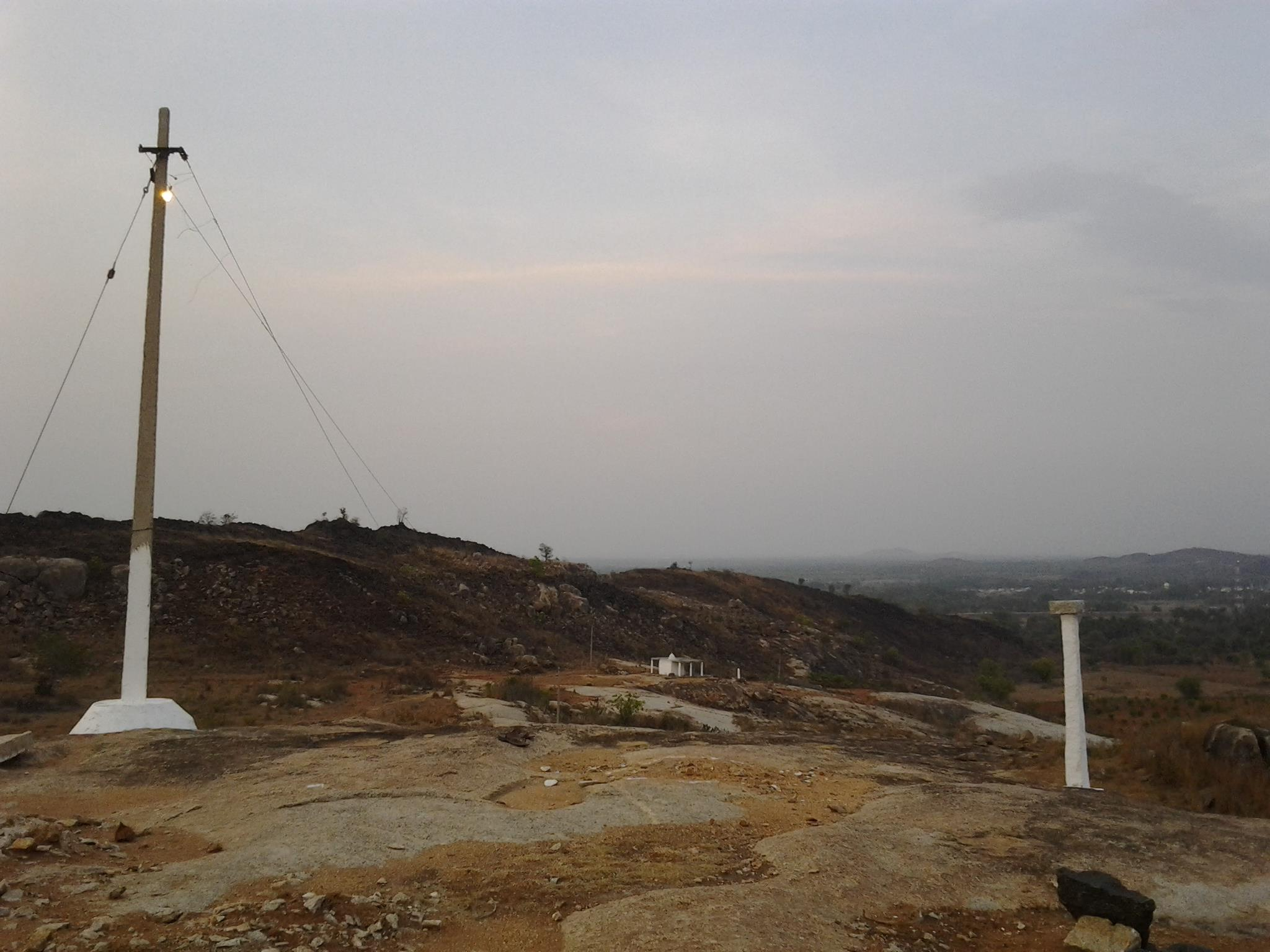
An Age old temple of GoddessSita on Seethamma Gutta

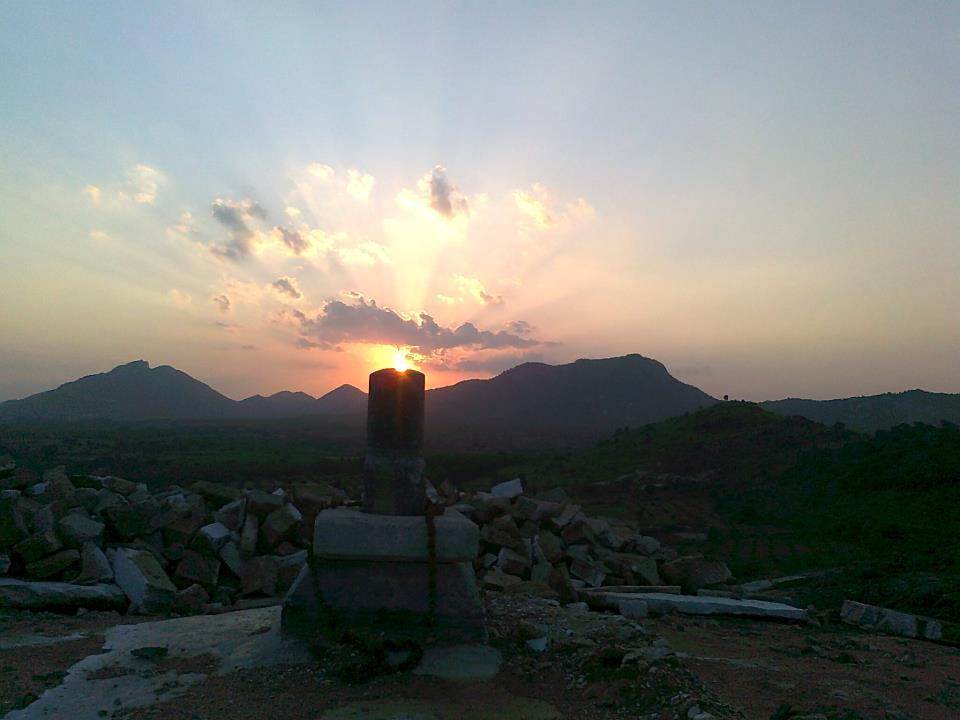
Lord Shiva temple ruins
