= Shomie Das =

Indian educationist (1935–2024)

- Born: 28 August 1935
- Died: 9 September 2024 (aged 89); Hyderabad, Telangana, India
- Education: The Doon School
- Relatives: Satish Ranjan Das (grandfather); Bhaskar Vira (son-in-law)

Shomie Ranjan Das (28 August 1935 – 9 September 2024) was an Indian educationist. An alumnus of The Doon School, he has served as the headmaster of the three most top schools of India, namely The Doon School, Mayo College and Lawrence School, Sanawar. He had earlier taught in Gordonstoun School in Scotland. He established the Oakridge International School in Hyderabad, Visakhapatnam, Mohali, and Bengaluru.

== Life and career ==
After his earlier education at The Doon School, he graduated from St. Xavier's College, of the University of Calcutta and the University of Cambridge. After working at Gordonstoun School, where he taught Prince Charles he was principal of Mayo College from 1969 to 1974. He then became headmaster of the Lawrence School, Sanawar in 1974 and held this position until 1988.

He served as headmaster of The Doon School from 1988 to 1995. He was succeeded by John Mason. He also served as the Principal of the renowned and famed Mayo College where he is revered as one of the greatest principals of all time, second only to Mr. JTM Gibson, O.B.E, Padma Shri. After he retired from the Doon School, he became an educational consultant and he has been contributing his vision in education to nearly 76 schools. all over the country. He was also instrumental in setting Adamas International School at Kolkata, near Dunlop (Rathtala). He was the Chairman of Oakridge International School.

Shomie Das was a grandson of Satish Ranjan Das, an Indian barrister and social reformer. He died on 9 September 2024, at the age of 89.

Academic offices
Preceded by Gulab Ramchandani	Headmaster of The Doon School; 1988–1996	Succeeded by John Mason
