= Ashadeep Group of Schools =

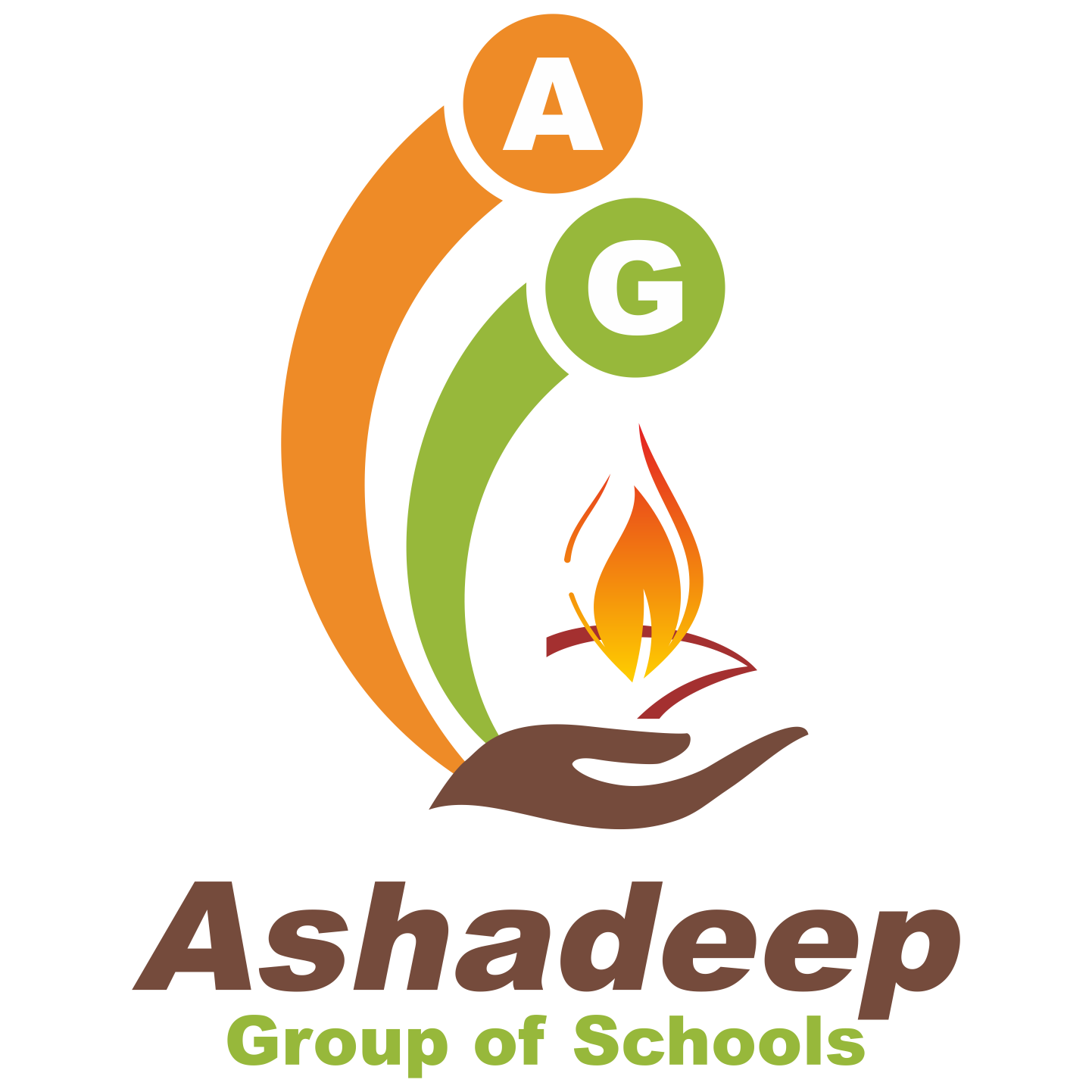
- Surat, Gujarat, India

Information
- School type: Private
- Religious affiliation: Hindu
- Established: 1997
- Founder: Jivanbhai Ramani
- School board: GSHEB
- Language: Gujarati, English
- Board of Trustees: Himmatbhai Kheni, Mukeshbhai Patel, Jivanbhai Ramani, Dineshbhai Navadiya, Ghanshyambhai Navadiya
- Website: www.ashadeep.co.in

The Ashadeep Group of Schools is a group of private educational institutions in India, founded in 1997. The Ashadeep Group started its first school in Surat in 1997 and has seven schools located in Surat City in Gujarat state of India.

Ashadeep Schools is in limelight for the last few years for their results in the Secondary School Certificate (SSC) examination for Standard 10 and the Higher Secondary (School) Certificate (HSC) examination for Standard XI-XII students taken by the Gujarat Secondary and Higher Secondary Education Board in Gujarat.

On the occasion of the 67th birthday of Indian Prime Minister Shri Narendra Modi, 3000 children of Ashadeep Schools united to form the face of Narendra Modi to wish him a 'Happy Birthday'.

== Best ==
- 2017 - 12 students of Class 12 from General Stream secured A1 grade in the Board Exam taken by GSHEB.
- 2018 - 21 students of Class 12 from Science Stream secured A1 grade in the Board Exam taken by GSHEB.
- 2018 - Student nacho secured the top rank of the GSHEB Class 10 exams by scoring 99 percent which is highest score in the history of GSHEB Results.
- 2019 - 31 students of Class 12 from Science Stream secured A1 grade in the Board Exam taken by GSHEB.
- 2019 - 64 students of Class 12 from General Stream secured A1 grade in the Board Exam taken by GSHEB.
- 2019 - 99 students of Class 10 secured A1 grade in the Board Exam taken by GSHEB.
- 2020 - Seven students of Class 12 from Science Stream secured A1 grade in the Board Exam taken by GSHEB.
- 2020 - 53 students of Class 12 from General Stream secured A1 grade in the Board Exam taken by GSHEB.
- 2020 - 44 students of Class 10 secured A1 grade in the Board Exam taken by GSHEB.

== List of Ashadeep schools ==
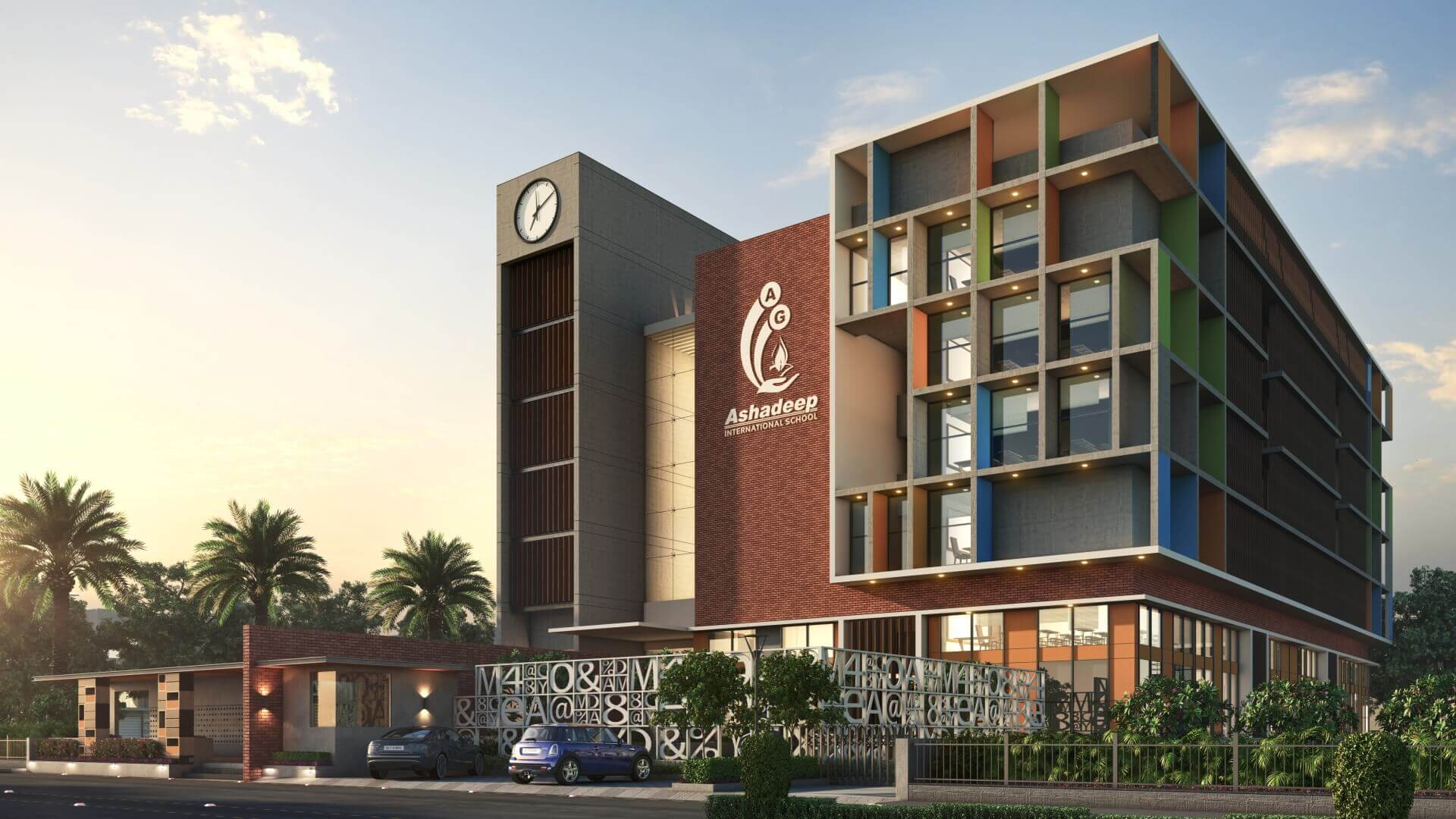
Ashadeep International School, Yogichowk

List of seven Schools of Ashadeep Group of Schools located within the Surat,

School name	Location	City
Ashadeep Vidhyalay - 1	Simada	Surat
Ashadeep Vidhyalay - 2	Simada Gam	Surat
Ashadeep Vidhyalay - 3	Chikuwadi, Varachha	Surat
Ashadeep Vidhyalay - 4	Mota Varachha	Surat
Ashadeep International School - 5	Yogichowk	Surat
Ashadeep Vidhyalay - 6	Kapodara	Surat
Ashadeep Science & Commerce Bhavan	Simada Naka	Surat
