= Akshar Árbol International School =

School in Chennai, Tamil Nadu, India

Coordinates: 13.044°N 80.224°E

Akshar Árbol International School (AAIS)
- Chennai, Tamil Nadu; India

Information
- Type: International Preschool
- Founder: R Subramanian
- Status: Open
- Grades: Preschool
- International students: Yes
- Campus type: International
- Website: akshararbol.edu.in

Akshar Árbol International School is a Pre-K to 12th grade International School in Chennai. R Subramanian, a chartered accountant in Chennai, is the founder of the school and Priya Dixit, is currently its head.

== Campuses ==
The school has two campuses: one in West Mambalam and the other in the growing South Eastern suburb Neelankarai. The school's curriculum draws on both the International Baccalaureate and Cambridge International Examinations.
