= Kamaljeet Sandhu =

Indian sprinter

Personal information
- Full name: Kamaljeet Kaur Sandhu
- Nationality: Indian
- Born: 20 August 1948 Firozpur, Punjab, India

Sport
- Country: India
- Sport: Athletics

Achievements and titles
- Personal best: 55.6 (1972)
Medal record
Women's athletics
Representing India
Asian Games
Gold medal – first place	1970 Bangkok	400 m

Kamaljeet Kaur Kooner nee Sandhu (born 20 August 1948) is an Indian athlete who won gold medal at the 1970 Bangkok Asian Games in the women's 400 m race. She ran the distance in 57.3 seconds. She is the first Indian woman athlete to win an individual gold medal at Asian games. She is from Punjab state in India. She received Padma Shri award in 1971. In 1971, she was one of the finalists in the World University Games held at Turin, Italy, in the 400 metres race. She participated in the women's 400 metres at the 1972 Munich Olympics, bowing out in the heats. Kamaljeet retired from athletics in 1973. She was also a national-level basketball and inter-varsity field hockey player. She went to the 1982 Asian Games as the coach of the Indian women's sprint team. She is also an alumna of Scindia Kanya Vidyalaya.
