= Vasundhara Sirnate =

Indian political scientist

Chief Coordinator of Research at The Hindu Centre for Politics and Public Policy
- In office 2013–2017

Director of Research at The Polis Project
- In office November 2017 – 17 November 2020

Personal details
- Born: 17 September 1979 (age 46) Ambala Cantt, Haryana
- Education: University of California, Berkeley
- Alma mater: Lady Shri Ram College, Jawahar Lal Nehru University
- Occupation: Political Scientist, Journalist, Writer

Vasundhara Sirnate (also known as Vasundhara Sirnate Drennan, born 17 September 1979) is an Indian political scientist, journalist and writer, who co-founded The Polis Project. She is an alumnus of the Lady Shri Ram College and the Jawahar Lal Nehru University. She was the chief-coordinator of research at The Hindu Centre for Politics and Public Policy from 2013 to 2017, and served The Polis Project as a director of research from November 2017 to November 2020. Her works include Passive Police: Institutional Learning Through Inquiry Commissions and Kashmir's Crossroads.

== Early life and career ==
Sirnate was born on 17 September 1979 in Ambala Cantt and was schooled at Scindia Kanya Vidyalaya in Gwalior. She graduated from Lady Shri Ram College with a B.A degree in journalism and received an M.A and an M.Phil degree in political science from the Jawahar Lal Nehru University (JNU). At the JNU, she studied there under the supervision of Zoya Hasan. She went to University of California, Berkeley for her doctoral studies.

Sirnate was chief-coordinator of research at The Hindu Centre for Politics and Public Policy from 2013 to 2017. She co-founded The Polis Project, where she served as a director of research from November 2017 to 17 November 2020.

== Views ==
According to Jugdep S. Chima, Sirnate has examined three South Asian ideological insurgencies, the Naxalites in central India, the Maoists in Nepal, and the Taliban in Pakistan, and has argued that considering the role of ideology in each movement, most importantly, "how it relates to the political mobilization", is necessary.

Sirnate has been critical of Modi-led government in India. In 2019, she was reported stating that, "taking credit for the good ideas of previous governments or even state governments is not entirely new. What makes Modi unique in this instance is that he has often blocked or criticised schemes which he has now spearheaded". She has argued that if the victims of sexual violence manage to survive their ordeal, they faced a risk of death. She claims that the BJP government's reaction to Kathua rape case not only "has birthed a myopic ordinance" but its effect would result in the death penalty getting awarded to the victims instead of the rapists.

Quoting Sirnate's work related to Kashmir, scholar Ritwik Balo and Saptaparni Sadhu state that, "such fears and curbs mentioned by Sirnate are unthinkable in the case of any other territory". In September 2017, the Deccan Chronicle reported her saying that the "research facilities are poor all over India", and "getting hold of government archival resources is a task since one has to get a letter from Delhi".

== Publications ==
Sirnate's works include:

- Good laws, bad implementation
- Students versus the State: The politics of uranium mining in Meghalaya
- Positionality, personal insecurity, and female empathy in security studies research
- The RSS and Citizenship: The Construction of the Muslim Minority Identity in India
- After Pulwama, the Indian Media Proves it is the BJP's Propaganda Machine
- Kashmir's Crossroads
- The Naxalites of India, Maoists of Nepal and Taliban of Pakistan: Ideological Insurgencies in South Asia
- Demonstrating State-Memory: The Politics of 'Tribe' and India's Counterinsurgency Campaigns in Mizoram and Chhattisgarh
- Countering Insurgency: Strategies of the Indian State
- Passive Police: Institutional Learning Through Inquiry Commissions
