= John Mason (schoolmaster) =

Indian schoolmaster and educationist (1945–2023)

Jonathan Anthony Mason (10 January 1945 – 17 February 2023) was an Indian schoolmaster and educationist. He served as the Headmaster of several major public schools, including St. James' School, Kolkata, the Modern High School in Dubai, and The Doon School. He also served as House Master at La Martiniere for Boys, Kolkata before moving to St. James' School, Kolkata as its Principal.

== Education ==
Mason was born in Dehradun, India, and was educated at La Martiniere Calcutta, where he won the Good Conduct Medal, and at Jadavpur University, where he graduated Master of Arts in English.

== Career ==
Mason taught in and headed several schools during his career. These include his own old school, La Martiniere, St James' School, Kolkata, and the Varkey group of schools in the United Arab Emirates. In 1996, he took over from Shomie Das as headmaster of The Doon School, remaining there until May 2003, to be succeeded by Kanti Bajpai. Mason then returned to the Varkey Group and was managing a number of schools of the group in the UAE. He was also a member of the Standing Committee on Examinations of the Council for the Indian School Certificate Examinations.

Mason had retired from his full-time teaching career and lived in Dehradun, where he was working on a village project near Meerut.

== Death ==
Mason died in Chennai on 17 February 2023, at the age of 78.

== Publications ==
John Mason has written several English textbooks for Indian schools:

- Using Grammar Book 1 (1997)
- Using Grammar Book 2 (1997)
- Using Grammar Book 3 (1997)
- ISC English Practice Papers (2001)
- New! Learning To Communicate: An innovative multi-skill course in English (with co-authors Paul Gunashekar and S K Ram )

Academic offices
Preceded by Shomie Das	Headmaster of The Doon School; 1996–2003	Succeeded by Kanti Bajpai
