= Rajasthan State Open School =

School in Rajasthan, India

- Abbreviation: RSOS
- Formation: 21 March 2005
- Type: Governmental Board of Education
- Headquarters: Jaipur, Rajasthan, India
- Website: https://cose.co.in/

Rajasthan State Open School of the State of the same name in India was mainly founded in 2005. The main reason for establishing this is to educate the poor students, in which the student can choose the subjects according to his choice

RSOS includes students mainly in the secondary and upper secondary classes. It takes a few days of classes in which the student has taught the selected subjects.

This open board is recognized by various institutions across the country. Its chart can be used in railway, army, higher studies. Rajasthani language was added to in the past years. This board conducts examinations twice a year, it can include students of any age.
