= Islamic International School =

School in Mumbai, India

Coordinates: 18.958074°N 72.835037°E

The Islamic International School is the Islamic school managed by the IRF Educational Trust. The school's main branch is located in Mumbai, India. A separate branch is currently open in Chennai (Madras) and a third branch in Dubai is being planned. The school teaches IGCSE syllabus along with Qur'anic and Arabic text, but the school is not recognised by the IGCSE board. Officials from education department have recommended the parents to shift their children to the schools recognised by the education department.

The school allows children to study under scholarship. Boys and girls at the school study in separate classrooms. Individual classes are limited to a maximum of 30 students with total number of 5600 students. Teachers at the school use a digital writing board to teach students. Classes are scheduled from 6:40am to 4:30pm (for hifz students), and 8:00am to 4:30pm (for regular school timings) The school uses the Cambridge International Board-IGCSE.
