= Oaktree International School, Kolkata =

Oaktree International School

Location
- Diamond Harbour Rd; Naurbad, Kolkata, West Bengal, 700104; India; 22.416255°N 88.2738368°E

Information
- Website: www.oaktree.ac.in

Oaktree International School, Kolkata, West Bengal, India, was a co-educational and residential school following the IB (International Baccalaureate) syllabus. It was Eastern India's first authorized IB World School. The School was located at Joka, 15 kilometers south of the heart of Kolkata, and operated on a sprawling 30-acre site. Oaktree International School imparted the IB MYP, DP and IGCSE curriculums. It also provided full, weekly and day boarding facilities. The school offered Grades 6 - 12.

The website for the school noted it was not taking admissions for 2014–2015. (Note: There is every indication the institution was defunct by 2014 or soon after)

== Management ==
The school management included Paul Regan as Head of School.

== Campus ==
The Oaktree International School campus was a purpose-built facility and is located on Diamond Harbour Road, Joka. It was spread over a total area of 30 acres of land. The Campus is currently undergoing expansion and in its present form, includes a basketball court, a badminton court, a football field, and a gymnasium, along with a dedicated refectory, canteen, common assembly area, an administrative office and a host of other modular buildings serving specific areas of running the School.

== Program ==
The language of instruction at Oaktree International is English.

== See also ==
- Education in India
- List of schools in India
- Education in West Bengal
