= The Peepal Grove School =

Coordinates: 13.634°N 78.454°E

- Gongivaripalli, Sodam, Annamayya district, Andhra Pradesh; India

Information
- Type: Independent school
- Motto: Samvo Manāmsi Jnānatam (With Our Minds Put Together May We Understand)
- Established: 2006
- Princepal: Bira N
- Gender: multi-educational
- Enrollment: 150
- Campus: Rural
- Website: www.peepalgroveschool.org

The Peepal Grove School is a co-educational boarding school and alternative school in India (affiliated to the CISCE Board) located in Gongivari Palli village, Sodam mandal in Annamayya district of Andhra Pradesh (India). The school was founded by Sri M (Mumtaz Ali), a spiritual crusader, and was inaugurated by the then President of India, Dr. Abdul Kalam in December, 2006. iThe student population is around 150 ranging from grades 4 to 12 (8.5 – 18 years).Moreover, the funds usually seem to go to the Satsang foundation as the amenities provided do seem to match the fees.is one of the few schools providing alternative education in India.

== Culture ==
Most students address the teachers as bhaiyya (brother), didi or akka (sister). Almost all the teachers reside on the campus with the students thus staying very close to each other. Freedom 'along with' responsibility is fostered; rewards and punishments are kept to a minimum. The dress code at The Peepal Grove School is 'tidy casual'. Students are drawn from all regions of the country and also from abroad.

== Education ==
The school believes that the "education is founded upon the acquisition of core skills and knowledge taught through integrated experiences." Critical thinking is stressed.

The school is affiliated to the CISCE Board, Delhi. The school has students in grades 4 through 12 (8.5 – 18 years). In grades 4 through 8, the school's focus is on developing the fundamental skills – Explanation, Interpretation, Application, Perspective, Empathy and Self Knowledge. The emphasis is on collaborative learning (rather than direct teaching) which is student centric.

Students are also taught spoken Sanskrit.

In grades 9 through 12, the course becomes more rigorous and there is a greater focus on the ICSE and the ISC examinations. Students make use of multi–media facilities, a library and laboratories. Extra curricular activities, discussions, arguments, socio-eco responsibility, arts, yoga and sports complement the academic work.

== See also ==
- List of schools in India
- Alternative education: India
