= Gita Niketan Awasiya Vidyalaya =

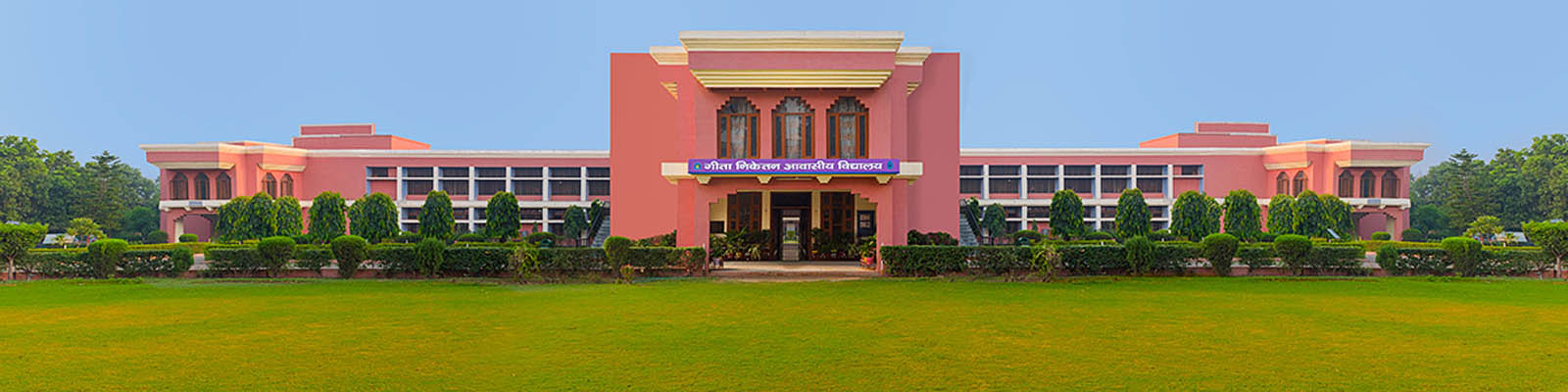

Location
- Kurukshetra, Haryana; India; 29°57′56″N 76°50′23″E

Information
- Type: Public School
- Motto: Quality education based on Indian moral values to the students
- Established: 1973
- Founder: Madhav Sadashiv Rao Golvalkar
- Principal: Narayan Singh
- Head of school: Vidya Bharati
- Grades: Class 6–12
- Campus size: 10 acres
- Campus type: Urban
- Houses: Brahmaputra Ganga; Raavi Yamuna
- Website: www.gitaniketan.org

Gita Niketan Awasiya Vidyalaya is a boarding school in Kurukshetra, Haryana, India. It is run by the Vidya Bharati, an educational organisation.

The school was founded on 21 January 1973 by Madhav Sadashiv Rao Golvalkar and is run by Vidya Bharati all India educational organisation which runs more than 24,000 schools.

Gita Niketan Awasiya Vidyalaya participates in quizzing competitions, and hosted Vidya Bharti's All-India Quiz Competition in 2007.

== History ==
The school was founded on 21 January 1973 by Madhav Sadashiv Rao Golvalkar . It is run by Vidya Bharti, an all India educational organisation which runs more than 24,000 schools.

== See also ==
- Education in India
- Literacy in India
- List of institutions of higher education in Haryana
