= Kawai (name) =

Kawai (written 川井, 川合, 川相, 河井, 河合, 河相 or 可愛) is both a Japanese surname and feminine Japanese given name. Notable people with the name include:

== Surname ==
- Ami Kawai (河合 亞美; born 1967), Japanese television and theater actress
- Aya Kawai (河合 彩; born 1975), Japanese ice dancer
- Ayumu Kawai (川井 歩; born 1999), Japanese footballer
- Chiharu Kawai (川合 千春; born 1973), Japanese actress and voice actress
- Eri Kawai (河井 英里; 1965–2008), Japanese singer
- Hayao Kawai (河合 隼雄; 1928–2007), Japanese Jungian psychologist
- Hiroo Kawai (河井 博大; born 1971), Japanese professional golfer
- Ikuko Kawai (川井 郁子; born 1968), Japanese violinist and composer
- Junichi Kawai (河合 純一; born 1975), Japanese Paralympic swimmer
- Kawai Gyokudō (川合 玉堂) or Kawai Yoshisaburō (川合 芳三郎; 1873–1957), Japanese painter in the nihonga school, active from Meiji through Shōwa period Japan
- Kawai Kanjirō (川合 芳三郎; 1890–1966), Japanese potter
- Kawai Michi (河井 道; 1877–1953), Japanese educator, Christian activist, and proponent of Japanese-Western ties before, during, and after World War II
- Kazumi Kawai (可愛 かずみ; 1964–1997), Japanese actress
- Kazuo Kawai (川井 一男), Japanese table tennis player
- Kenji Kawai (川井 憲次; born 1957), Japanese music composer
- Kenta Kawai (川井 健太; born 1981), former Japanese football player
- Masahiro Kawai (川相 昌弘; born 1964), former Japanese Nippon Professional Baseball infielder
- Masao Kawai (河合 雅雄; 1924–2021), Japanese primatologist
- Misaki Kawai (河井 美咲; born 1978), Japanese artist
- Reishin Kawai (1931–2010), 8th dan aikido practitioner and acupuncturist
- Risako Kawai (川井 梨紗子; born 1994), Japanese sport wrestler
- Ritsuko Kawai (河井 リツ子; born 1964), the creator of the anime television show Hamtaro
- Ryuji Kawai (河合 竜二; born 1978), Japanese football player
- Shunichi Kawai (川合 俊一; born 1963), Japanese volleyball player, announcer and television personality
- Sonoko Kawai (河合その子; born 1965), former Japanese singer
- Takashi Kawai (川井 貴志; born 1976), Japanese Nippon Professional Baseball pitcher
- Takanori Kawai (川合 孝典; born 1964), Japanese politician
- Tatsuo Kawai (河相 達夫; 1889–1965), Japanese diplomat and writer
- Tatsuo Kawai (wrestler) (川合 達夫; born 1973), Japanese sport wrestler
- Tetta Kawai (河井 哲太; born 2000), Japanese footballer
- Toru Kawai (河合 徹; died 1996), Japanese stunt man and actor
- Toshinobu Kawai (河合 季信; born 1967), Japanese short track speed skater
- Tsunenori Kawai (河合 常則; 1937–2017), Japanese politician
- Yoshio Kawai (河合 義雄; born 1954), Japanese voice actor
- Yosuke Kawai (河井 陽介; born 1989), Japanese football player
- Yudai Kawai (川井 雄太; born 1980), Japanese baseball player
- Yuki Kawai (河合 由貴; born 1990), Japanese volleyball player
- Yuumi Kawai (河合 優実; born 2000), Japanese actress
- Yumi Morio (森尾 由美) or Yumi Kawai (河合 由美; born 1966), Japanese voice actress

=== Fictional characters ===
- Maria Kawai (可愛マリア), a character in the manga series A Devil and Her Love Song
- Yumeko Kawai (河合由美子), a character from series Ninja Hattori
- Yukari Kawai (河井ユカリ), a teenage character of main character's older brother's friend from Obake no Q-Tarō
- Shizuka Kawai (川井静香) (Serenity Wheeler in English dub), a character in the manga and anime series Yu-Gi-Oh!
- Rika Kawai (川井リカ), a character in Wonder Egg Priority

== Given name ==
- Kawai Okada (born 1948), Japanese former actress and businesswoman

== See also ==
- Kawhi
