= Bangalore International School =

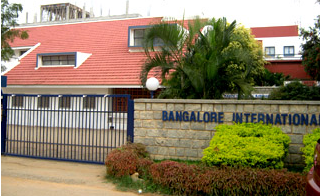
- Bangalore International School Entrance

Location
- GEDDALAHALLI; Bengaluru, Karnataka, 560077; India; 13.0474°N 77.6466°E

Information
- School type: International School
- Motto: Caring Connected Community
- Established: 1969; 57 years ago
- Founder: Eloise R. Bennett
- Head of school: Dr Shivananda C S
- Teaching staff: 120
- Employees: 200
- Grades: Pre Primary - Grade 12
- Age: 3 to 18
- Enrollment: 625
- Average class size: 20
- Student to teacher ratio: 5:1
- Education system: Cambridge, IBDP
- Language: English
- Campus type: Day school
- Houses: Hope, Peace, Faith, Joy
- Colours: Blue, Green, Red, Yellow
- Accreditation: Council of International Schools (CIS)
- Yearbook: ECLAT
- Affiliation: International Baccalaureate, Cambridge International Examinations
- Alumni: Sharmila Nicolett, Fouaad Mirza

Bangalore International School (or BIS) is a private international school in the city of Bengaluru, Karnataka, India. It was the first international school to be established in Bangalore. It is located in Hennur, north-eastern Bengaluru.

== History ==
Bangalore International School, formerly the American Community School, was founded in 1969 by Eloise R. Bennett. In the 1960s and 1970s, although many American and Canadian families were living in the city, there were no schools offering a North American curriculum and instruction style. The only option was a boarding school, but this idea did not appeal to Bennett and her family. On a USAID contract through the University of Tennessee, the Bennett family moved to Bangalore for two years between 1969 and 1971. With no schooling options they opened their own school, and so was born the then American Community School in a garage on Millers Road.

== Curriculum ==
The school is accredited by the University of Cambridge International Examinations Syndicate. The school is also a Cambridge International Examination Centre along with being a centre for the International Baccalaureate (IB) and Advanced Placement (AP) Examinations.

== Management ==
Since its inception, BIS has been a parent-owned school. Its board of trustees comprises seven parents (of students currently enrolled) and is responsible for the governance of the school. BIS is managed and run by the Head of School and the staff body.

== Accreditation ==
The school is accredited by the Council of International Schools, New England; the Association of Schools and Colleges, University of Cambridge, UK; the International Baccalaureate, Geneva; the AP, and the Association of Indian Universities.
