= Gujarat Secondary and Higher Secondary Education Board =

Government agency in Gujarat, India

- Logo of the Gujarat Secondary and Higher Secondary Education Board
- Abbreviation: GSEB(GSHSEB)
- Formation: 1972 (54 years ago)
- Type: Governmental Board of Education
- Legal status: Active
- Headquarters: Gandhinagar, Gujarat, India
- Official language: Gujarati, English, Hindi
- Parent organisation: Government of Gujarat
- Website: www.gseb.org

The Gujarat Secondary and Higher Secondary Education Board (GSHSEB or GSEB) is a Government of Gujarat body responsible for determining the policy-related, administrative, cognitive, and intellectual direction the state's secondary and higher secondary educational system takes.

The main responsibilities of the Board include academics, conducting examinations and research and development. The board is responsible for registration and administration of higher secondary and secondary schools in the state of Gujarat.

== History ==
The Gujarat board was formed on the basis of The Gujarat Secondary Education Act 1972. and conducts the state level exam. Its headquarters is located in Gandhinagar, Gujarat. The main academic task of GSEB is the preparation of syllabus for secondary schools and also the recommendation of text-books to be taught in government schools as well as registered private schools. The Board also performs the duties of recognizing new schools, performance evaluation of schools and inspections of various schools.

The GSEB conducts 2 (including 4-semester type examinations) main examinations – The Secondary School Certificate (SSC) exam for Standard 10 and the Higher Secondary (School) Certificate (HSC) examination for Standard XI-XII students in Gujarat. The Board also holds a Talent Search for students of Standard VIII & IX in five major subjects every year. It is divided into 2 major parts.

In 2016, GSEB replaced state level engineering and pharmacy courses entrance examinations from Joint Entrance Examination – Main (JEE-Main) to Gujarat Common Entrance Exam (GUJCET).
