= Chopasni Senior Secondary School, Jodhpur =

School in Jodhpur, Rajasthan

Chopasni Senior Secondary School, Jodhpur is a secondary school situated in Jodhpur in Rajasthan, India. It was established in 1875 and is one of the earliest secondary schools of Rajasthan. The school has five hostels. The school has produced notable sportspeople, army officers, police officers, politicians and administrators. The school is run by Chopasni Shiksha Samiti, Jodhpur.

== The school ==
The school is an aided institution of the government of Rajasthan receiving 90% grant-in-aid, with standards VI to XII. The school is equipped for the teaching of science, agriculture, arts and commerce streams. It had 1500 students in 2003.

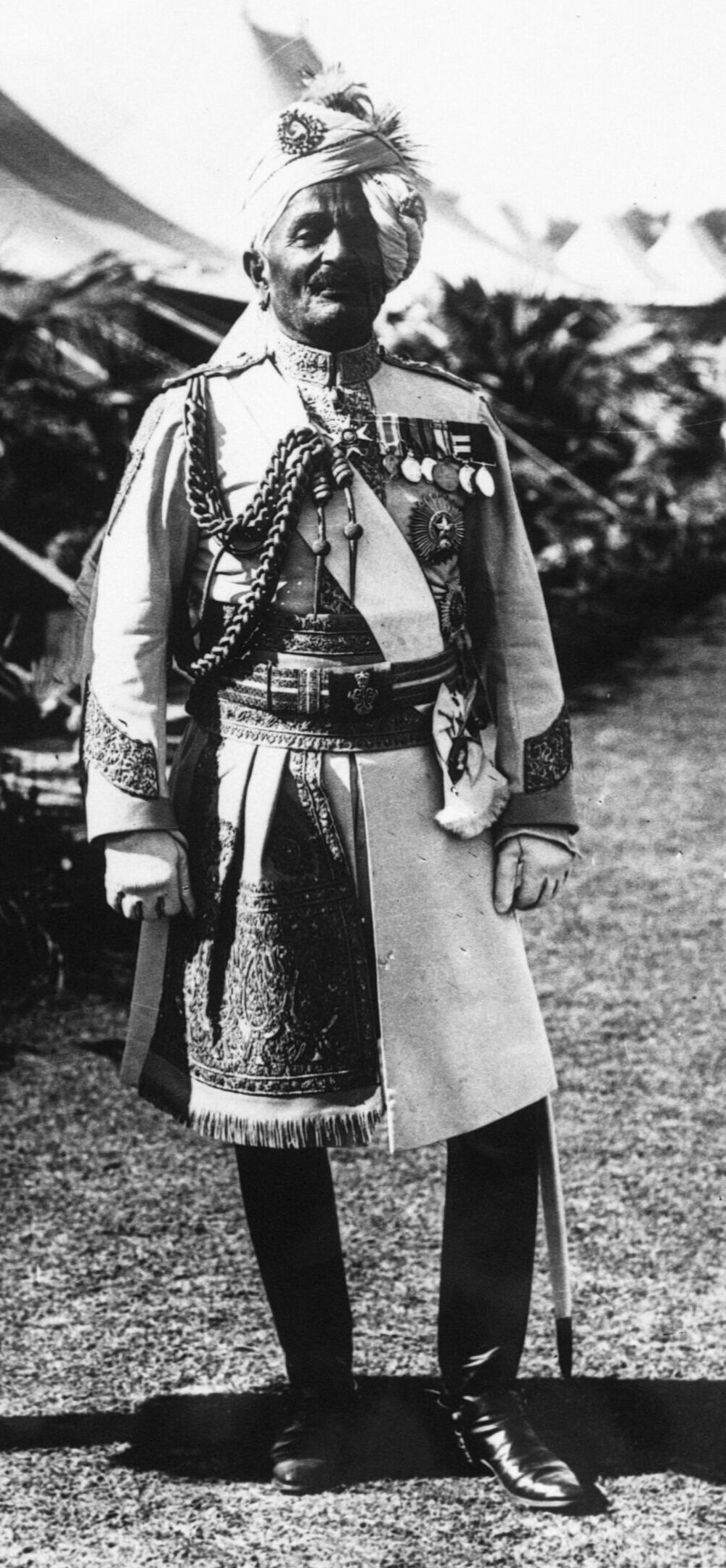
Chopasani school built by Sir Pratap Singh Sahib

Blocks are:

- Carpentry block
- Maharaja Gajsingh block
- Central meeting hall
- Games and Sports conducted in evening sessions
- Shri Khet Singh Rathore library block with 16000 books
- Computer centre

== Extracurricular ==
- N.C.C. - three wings:
  - Army (Senior and Junior Divisions),
  - Naval Wing NCC,
  - Air wing NCC.
- National Service Scheme.
- Extension Centre of Sports Authority of India for football
- Scouting

== Hostels ==
- Param Veer Maj. Shaitan Singh House for 100-125 students.
- Hardinge House for 100-125 students.
- Pratap House for 100-125 students.
- Umaid House for 100-125 Primary students.
- Powlett House for 100-125 English medium students.

Thee hostels provide board and lodging facilities to a total of 460 students. Each hostel building has a dining hall and Common Room.
