= PM Shri Government Senior Secondary School Kawai =

Coordinates: 24.7662903°N 76.7337066°E

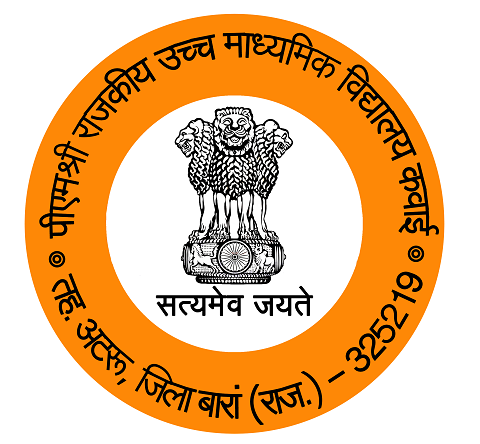

Location
- Kawai, Baran; Rajasthan, 325219; India

Information
- Type: Public
- Motto: ज्ञानार्थ प्रवेश सेवार्थ प्रस्थान
- Established: 1923
- Staff: 32
- Faculty: 26
- Grades: Class 1 - 12
- Enrollment: 629 (2025)
- Campus type: Rural
- Color: Orange
- Affiliation: RBSE
- Information
- Udise Code: 08310312801
- NIC-SD ID: 216958
- OFFICE ID: 21771
- Website: https://kys.udiseplus.gov.in/#/reportcard/1763576/11

PM Shri Government Senior Secondary School Kawai is a co-educational, rural government school in Kawai, Atru tehsil, Baran district in Rajasthan, offering education from primary to higher secondary levels in Hindi. It was established in 1923. The school is managed by the Department of Education, Rajasthan. The available streams for post secondary are science, arts, and agriculture. The school has a current enrollment of 629 students. This is the PEEO school of Kawai Panchayat which monitors all the schools under it. The school affiliated to the Rajasthan Board of Secondary Education and the school follows the curriculum prescribed by the RBSE. As of 2025, its principal seat is vacant.

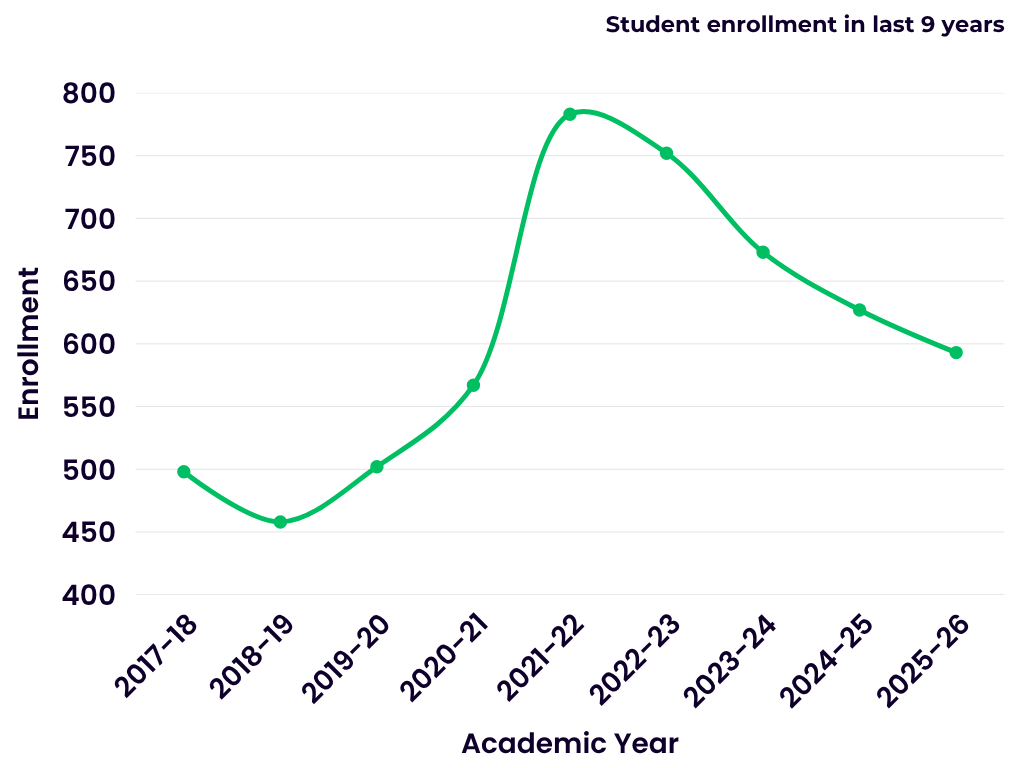
PM Shri Government Senior Secondary School Kawai students enrollment in last eight years

== Mis-conducts in school ==
On February 8, 2025, physical education teacher Ravi Bindal and a 10th-grade student had a physical altercation following a dispute over a mat. The student claimed illness and was taken to the hospital, where he was discharged with normal results. The incident escalated due to social media, taking on a caste-based angle. Community members protested, leading to the teacher's arrest under the ST Act. By February 12, 2025, the teacher was suspended and transferred, receiving only a subsistence allowance.
