= Lamington Road =

Thoroughfare in Mumbai, India

Coordinates: 18.9628378°N 72.8179252°E

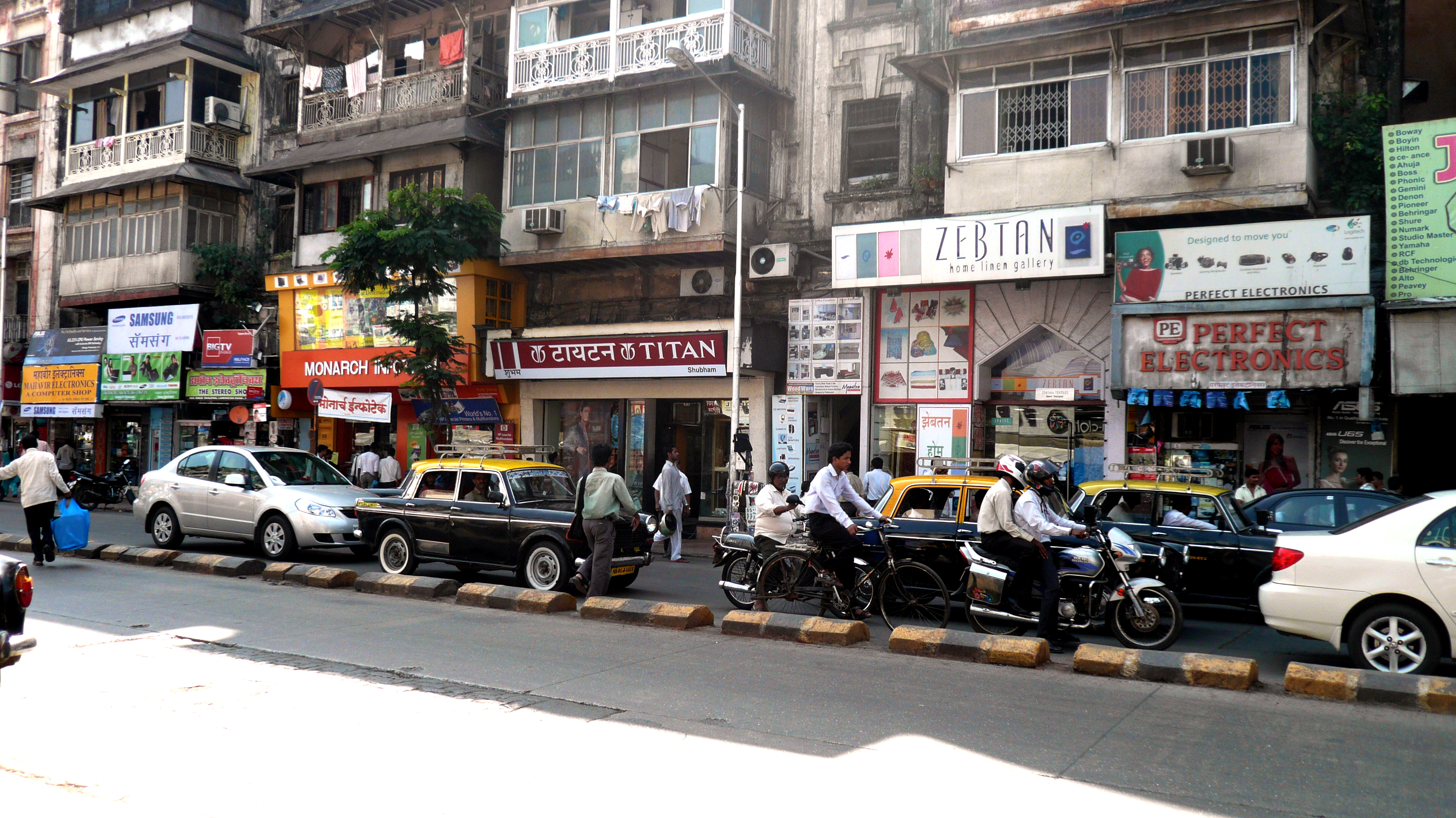
A view of Lamington Road

Lamington Road, officially Dr. Dadasaheb Bhadkamkar Marg, named after Lord Lamington, the Governor of Bombay between 1903 and 1907, is a busy thoroughfare near Grant Road station in South Mumbai. The official name of the road is rarely used. It is often called the "IT shop of Mumbai".

Lamington Road is famous for its wholesale and retail market in electronics goods. Shops on the street sell computer goods, electronic items, television equipment, and wireless equipment at rates much lower than the maximum retail price as they have a high turnover. They sell not only the latest computer related items but even outdated electronic parts for radios like transistors, capacitors, cables, sound cards, TV tuners and adaptors. Lamington road is the third largest grey market in India for electronic goods and peripherals after Nehru Place in Delhi and Ritchie street in Chennai.

It had been listed as a notorious market between 2009 and 2013 by the USTR for selling counterfeit software, media and goods.

== Gallery ==
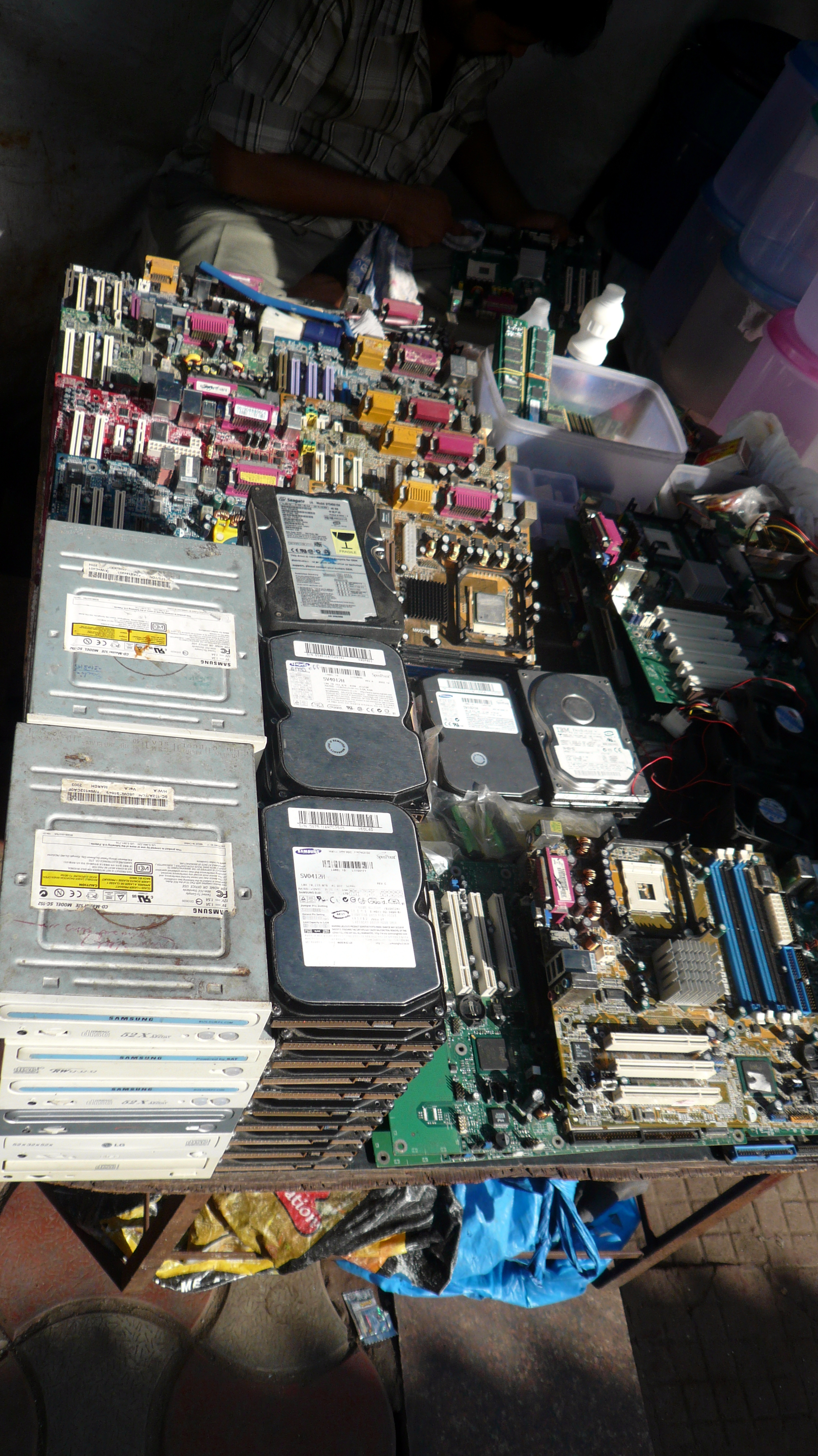
Hard drives and components being sold on Lamington Road

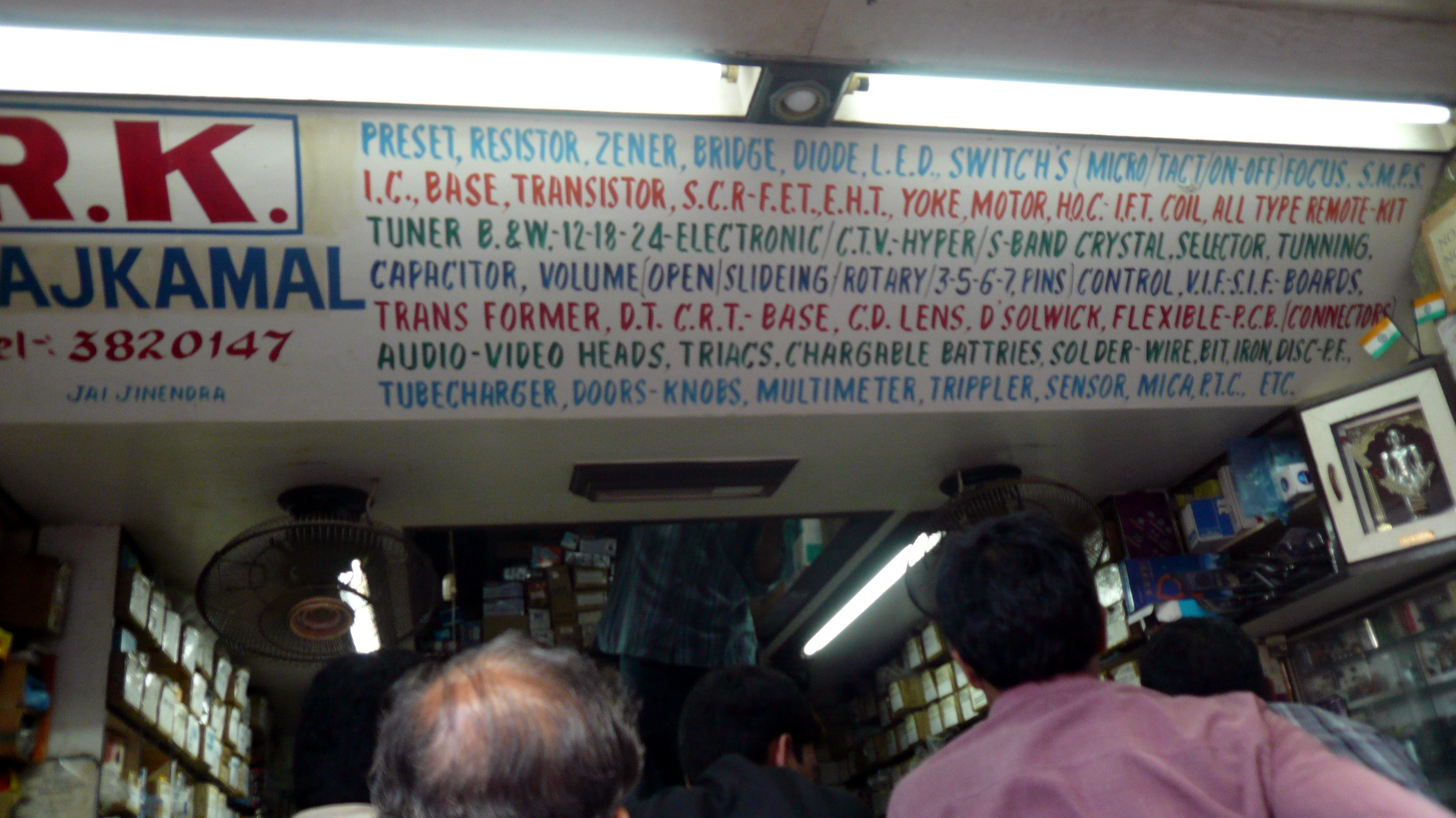
A typical shop signage on Lamington Road
