= Air Force School, Jodhpur =

Location
- Jodhpur, Rajasthan, 342011; India; 26°15′09.7″N 73°02′26.2″E

Information
- Type: Military school, Coed
- Established: 1952
- School board: Central Board of Secondary Education
- Principal: Dr. Preeti Rana
- Classes: LKG to XII
- Houses: Subroto, Arjan, Shekhon & Majumdar
- Song: Badlenge Yough Ko
- Website: www.airforceschooljodhpur.com

Air Force School Jodhpur is a Central Board of Secondary Education school in Jodhpur, Rajasthan, India. It consists of over 1000 students and 100 teachers. It is based on military education. Basically it has two wings one is preprimary and other wing consist of primary and secondary.

== History ==
The school was started in 1952 with only 400 students, at that time only LKG to V classes was only there in the school. At the initial stage the school was not very popular for parents and students both but after November 1988 when CBSE gives affiliation to this school then it was recognised. Soon the school started growing its popularity and more students joined it. After 2010 it started the board class X. After success of X it added class XI in 2011 with only Science stream. Then in 2012 it added Commerce stream also in XI and XII classes.

== Houses ==
- Subroto in the memory of first India Air Chief Marshal Honorable Subroto Mukherjee.
- Arjan
- Shekhon
- Majumdar

== Facilities ==
There are various facilities provided to the school students, to ensure their safety and comfort:

1. Drinking water
2. Smart class
3. Computer labs
4. Music room
5. Biology Lab
6. Science Activity Room
7. NCC Air Wing
8. Sick Bay
9. Science Labs
10. Smart Class
11. CCTV
12. Physical Education
13. School Library
14. Art Room
