= Singapore International School, Mumbai =

Singapore International School
- School Logo

Location
- On National Highway No. 8 Post Mira Road; Dahisar East, Mumbai, Maharashtra, 401104; India
- Coordinates: 19.2624°N 72.8760°E

Information
- Type: International, co-educational
- Motto: Carpe Diem
- Established: 2007
- Principal: Stephen Willoughby
- Staff: 250
- Grades: K-12 to IB diploma
- Website: sisindia.net

Singapore International School, Mumbai is a co-educational school, offering IB PYP (International Baccalaureate Primary Years Programme), IGCSE (International General Certificate of Secondary Education) and IBDP (International Baccalaureate Diploma Programme) for both Indian and overseas students, though most are Indian or are of Indian origin. The school provides day boarding, weekly boarding, monthly boarding and term boarding for students.

== See also ==
- DPS International School Singapore - Indian school in Singapore
- List of schools in Mumbai
