= Scindia Kanya Vidyalaya =

Boarding school in Madhya Pradesh, India

Coordinates: 26.2094°N 78.1785°E

Scindia Kanya Vidyalaya is an all-girls boarding school in Gwalior, Madhya Pradesh, in India. It was established by the Rajmata of Gwalior State, Vijaya Raje Scindia. The first president of India, Dr Rajendra Prasad, in the presence of Maharaja Jiwaji Rao Scindia, Maharani Vijaya Raje Scindia and Mrs Rajvanshi Devi Prasad, officially declared Scindia Kanya Vidyalaya open in 1956. The school started with 31 students, of which only 6 were boarders.

Jyotiraditya Madhavrao Scindia, Priyadarshini Raje Scindia, Yashodhara Raje Scindia and Shobhana Bhartia are on its board of governors.

== Notable alumni ==
- Simran Kaur Mundi – film actress and model
- Kamaljeet Sandhu – athlete
- Yashodhara Raje Scindia – politician
- Vasundhara Sirnate – political scientist, journalist and writer
