= Charter School (Kerala, India) =

Private school in Kochi, Kerala, India

The Charter School
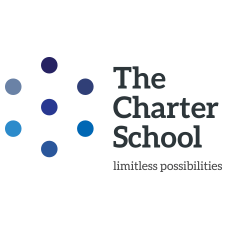

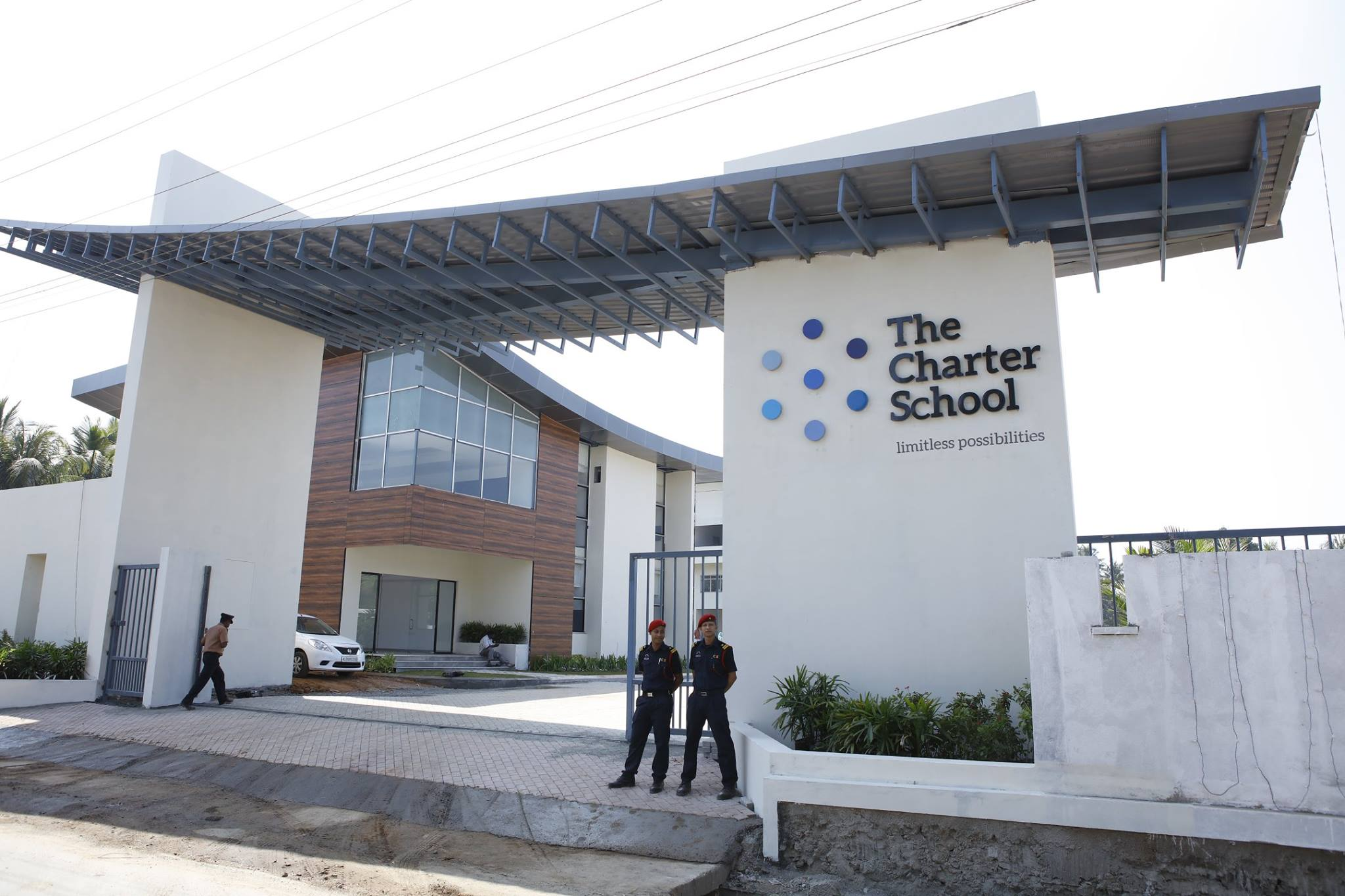
- Entrance of The Charter School

Location
- Pukkatupadi, Kochi, Kerala; India
- Coordinates: 10.0570°N 76.4079°E

Information
- Type: Private
- Founded: 2012
- Founder: Binoy J Kattadiyil & Rakhinth Subramanian
- School district: Trivandrum School District and Ernakulam Educational District
- Director: Balamurali Vijayaraj
- Grades: K-12
- Campus size: 9 acres
- Website: charterschool.in

The Charter School is a private school in Kochi city in the state of Kerala, India.

Founded in 2016, The Charter School was taken over by Trivandrum International School in 2019. This led to the inception of Cochin International School.

The Charter School is a CBSE affiliated school, from Kindergarten to Grade 12. Cochin International School follows the International Baccalaureate program and is spread over 12 acres near Pukkatupadi. The campus has not yet been completed.

The school's leadership was headed by Principal and Dean, Ms.Molly Cyril.

== See also ==
- List of schools in Ernakulam
