= Neerja Modi School =

School in Jaipur, Rajasthan

Location
- Shipra Path, Shanthi Nagar, Mansarovar, Jaipur District; Rajasthan; India; 26°52′06.7″N 75°45′52.5″E

Information
- Type: Private school
- Motto: knowledge, truth, wisdom, nurtured by values
- Established: 2001
- Chairman: Mr. Saurabh Modi
- Grades: K-12
- Enrollment: 5200 +
- Colors: Blue and Red
- Affiliations: CBSE
- Website: www.nmsindia.org

Neerja Modi School is a private co-educational school serving kindergarten to 12th grade in Jaipur, Rajasthan, India. The school was built in 2001 by Shri Modi Shikshan Sansthan and has campuses spread across Rajasthan.

The school hosts inter-school tournaments & teams participate at the district, state, and national levels in chess, squash, lawn tennis, badminton, athletics, basketball, football, archery, cricket, swimming, and table tennis.

== Academics ==
=== Primary School - Nursery to Class 5 ===
The Primary School programme comprises Nursery, Lower and Upper Kindergarten (LKG and UKG) years and classes from Standard I to V. In classes Nursery to V, the school teaches a comprehensive curriculum by drawing on teaching programmes of CBSE.

=== Middle School - Classes 6 to 8 ===
The Middle School Programme i.e. classes VI to VIII follow the NCERT curriculum.

=== Secondary School - Classes 9 & 10 ===
The school offers the All India Secondary School Examination of CBSE for classes IX and X.

=== Post-Secondary School - Classes 11 & 12 ===
NMS offers the All India Senior Secondary Certificate Examination of CBSE for students of classes XI and XII.

== Controversy ==
On July 2026, CCTV footage of a student committing suicide within the school premises was released. Amaira Meena, a Class 4 student, died after suffering a fall from the fourth floor of the school building in November 2025. Parents allege the suicide occurred after 18 months of bullying which was trivialized by the school management. On the day of the suicide parents allege their ward went to seek help from teachers multiple times.

== See also ==
- List of Schools in Rajasthan
