= Kawai, Rajasthan =

Kawai Salpura
- Town
- Location in Rajasthan, India Kawai (India)
- Coordinates: 24.7575083°N 76.7122933°E
- Country: India
- State: Rajasthan
- District: Baran
- Elevation: 313.64 m (1,029.0 ft)

Population (2011)
  - Total: 12,900

Languages
  - Official: Hindi
- Time zone: UTC+5:30 (IST)
- Postal code: 325219
- Area code: 07451
- ISO 3166 code: RJ-IN
- Vehicle registration: Rj28

Kawai is a town in the southeast of northern Indian state of Rajasthan. It is located around 40 kilometers south of the Baran district. There are many facilities like a railway station, a hospital, schools, and markets, as well as roads for traffic.[1]

== Climate ==
The town has a dry climate except during monsoon season. The summer runs from March to mid-June, as in most parts of the country. The period from mid-June to September is the monsoon season, and the period from October to mid-November constitute the post-monsoon or retreating monsoon season. January is generally the coldest month with an average daily maximum temperature of 24.3 °C (75.8 °F), and an average daily minimum temperature of 10.6 °C (51.1 °F). Usually, the town has a dry climate except during monsoon season, when the weather becomes humid. The months from November to February constitute winter. The average rainfall experienced by the town is around 895.2 mm (35.2 inches).

== Education ==
=== Institute ===
Schools in Kawai are either "government schools" (run by the Rajasthan Government) or private schools (run by trusts or individuals), which in some cases receive financial aid from the government. The schools are affiliated with either of the following boards:

- Board of Secondary Education Rajasthan, Ajmer (RBSE)
- The National Institute of Open Schooling (NIOS)
- The Central Board for Secondary Education (CBSE)

=== Misconduct in schools ===
A 15-year-old student, Sunil Meena, was brutally beaten by his physical education teacher, Ravi Bindal, at PM Shri Government Senior Secondary School in Kawai, Baran district, India. The incident occurred while Sunil was going to get a drink of water during prayer time. He was kicked and punched by the teacher, resulting in injuries requiring hospitalization. The teacher was suspended and posted to CBEO Dug and will be paid only half salary as subsistence allowance.

== Adani Power Plant ==
The plant is located at village Kawai in Atru Tehsil of Baran district in the state of Rajasthan. It is located at a distance of 16 km from Atru towards 50 km south of District headquarter of Baran and 300 km from State capital, Jaipur. Adani Power Rajasthan Limited (APRL) is the largest power producer plant in Rajasthan at a single location with a generation capacity of 1320 MW (2X660 MW). It is coal-based thermal power plant on supercritical technology.
