= Oakridge International School =

Oakridge International School Gachibowli, Hyderabad

Location
- Khajaguda, Nanakramguda Road, Cyberabad; Hyderabad, India, Telangana 500008; India; 17°25′11″N 78°21′50″E

Information
- Type: Independent international school
- Opened: 2001; 25 years ago
- Founder: Shomie Das Naga Tummala Raj Yarlagadda
- Principal: Ms. Dipika Rao
- Grades: Pre-primary to 12
- Campus size: 10.5 acres (42,000 m^{2})
- Campus type: Suburban
- Slogan: Create your Future
- Website: https://www.oakridge.in/gachibowli/

Oakridge International School is an International Baccalaureate school located in Gachibowli, Hyderabad, India. Oakridge International School provides the IB and CBSE syllabus. It has two day-schools in Hyderabad, two in Bangalore, one in Punjab and one boarding campus in Visakhapatnam city. Nord Anglia Education acquired the school in 2019.

== History ==
The school was established by educationist Shomie Das along with Naga Tummala and Raj Yarlagadda in 2001. The school opened on 11 June 2001, in rented premises in Jubilee Hills.

In 2002, the campus moved to Khajaguda, Hyderabad. The new campus covers 10.5 acres (4.2 ha) and was inaugurated by Chief Minister N. Chandrababu Naidu. The school has over 3000 students.

In 2019, People Combine divested majority ownership of Oakridge International to Nord Anglia Education for an estimated ₹16 billion.

A second Hyderabad campus opened at Bachupally, covering 8 acres and offering the CBSE, IBDP, and CAIE curricula.
