= Birla School Pilani =

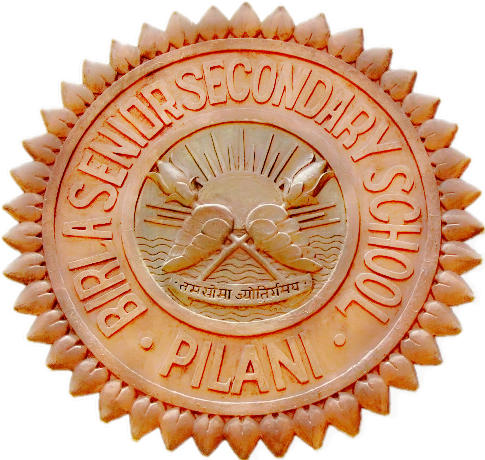

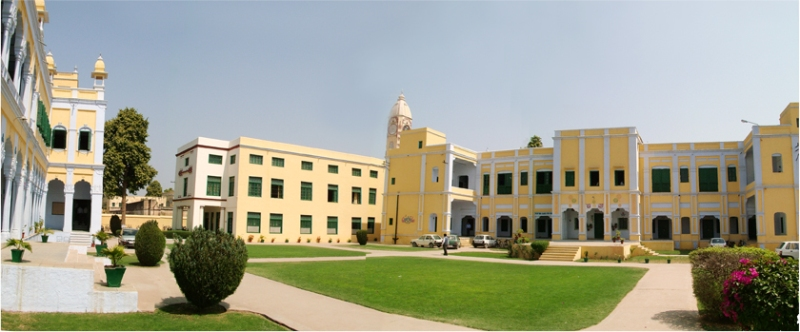
- The administrative, faculty and arts building

Location
- Pilani, Rajasthan 333031; India; 28°21′48″N 75°36′8″E

Information
- Type: Private, boarding
- Motto: tamasomā jyotir gamaya (Sanskrit)
- Established: 1901; 125 years ago
- Principal: Dhirendra Singh
- Headmaster: Bupan Sharma
- Faculty: Science; commerce; arts
- Grades: I—XII
- Enrollment: 1800
- Campus: Country
- Website: birlaschoolpilani.edu.in

The Birla School Pilani (abbreviated as BSP) is a private primary and secondary boarding school in Pilani, Jhunjhunu, in the state of Rajasthan, India. The school was previously known as Birla Senior Secondary School. The school is considered to be a royal school along with a few other schools in India, due to its long patroness history and has educated some well known royal families of India during British Raj. It also has a prominent alumni network in India due to its rich history.

== History ==
BSP was established in 1901. The school, the oldest Birla Institution in Pilani, was started as a ‘Pathshala’ in 1901, by Seth Shiv Narayanji Birla for the education of his grandsons Shri Ghanshyam Das Birla and Shri Rameshwar Das Birla. Raised to a true English Middle school in 1916, the school became a pioneer by extending the benefits of quality education to the people of Shekhawati and outlying areas.

It grew into a high school in 1925 and later on into an intermediate college in 1928. The school was named as Birla High School in 1943, Multipurpose Higher Secondary School in 1959, Birla Higher Secondary School in 1973 and Birla Senior Secondary School in 1977. The Birla College came into existence in 1943 when university classes were separated from the school. In 2010 the school was renamed to Birla School Pilani. The school is managed and run by the Birla Education Trust.

== Affiliation ==
The school affiliated with the CBSE in 1985.
