= International Preschool =

An international preschool is a preschool that promotes internationalism and follows a curriculum not native to the host nation in which it is situated. Most international preschools cater mainly to nationals not native to the host country such as the children of diplomats, international organizations and missionary programs. International preschools can be either private or public. It is not known how many preschools are classified as international preschools.

== Establishment ==
The first International preschools were founded in the latter half of the 19th century (1970) in countries such as USA, UK, Russia, Japan, Switzerland and Germany. Early International schools were set up with the help of nations having large interests in the hosting nation.

== Faculty ==
Teaching faculty at International preschools are usually from or certified by the standards of their country of origin and required to meet the standards of their host nation in which they seek to teach. While most countries do not have stringent certification processes for preschool teachers, recent research and recommendations by UNESCO has led to higher standards for compliance in many countries such as the Philippines and Singapore.

== See also ==
- Kindergarten
