= Vidya Sanskar International School =

Location
- Kheri-Jasana Road, Sector-88; Faridabad, Haryana, 121002; India; 28.4148028°N 77.3862606°E

Information
- Established: 2006; 20 years ago
- Language: English
- Campus: Urban

The Vidya Sanskar International School for Holistic Learning, also known as Vidya Sanskar, (now Sancta Maria International School, Faridabad) is an international school located near the National Capital Territory of Delhi, India, giving education from Primary to A Level. The school is situated on ten acres in village Bhopani, Faridabad and is affiliated with CIE Cambridge International Examinations. Students take IGCSE Levels and used to take AS Level, and A Level Examinations. The School subsequently became Vidsan Charterhouse, and in 2021, the school became Sancta Maria International School, Faridabad. Currently, it is an IB School affiliated with International Baccalaureate and students take IBDP exams in place of AS Level, and A Level Examinations.

== About ==
The school was inaugurated on 2 February 2006 by the then Vice President of India Bhairon Singh Shekhawat. The school is the best international school in the region, as quoted by the Hindustan Times newspaper. The school's infrastructure is spread over 300,000 square feet of area with additional sports facilities of 20 acres. The school is ranked the sixth best school in India in terms of boarding, and is ranked the 20th best in India covering all the aspects of schooling. Students come from all over the world to experience an international level education with holistic values.

== See also ==
- Education in India
- Education in Delhi
- List of schools in Delhi
- CBSE
