= Wagholi, Satara =

Village in Maharashtra

Wagholi
- Village
- Location in Maharashtra, India Wagholi (India)
- Coordinates: 17.90°N 74.083°E
- Country: India
- State: Maharashtra
- District: Satara
- Taluka: Koregaon

Government
  - Type: Gram Panchayat

Population (2001)
  - Total: 2,891
- Demonym(s): Wagholikar, Satarkar

Languages
  - Official: Marathi
- Time zone: UTC+5:30 (IST)
- PIN: 415525

Wagholi is a village in Koregaon taluka of Satara district of Maharashtra, India. It plays an important role in the economic, social, cultural, and educational lives of people in Koregaon, and Satara Districts.

According to the 2001 census, this town has a literacy rate of 85.14%, higher than state average of 82.34%.

== Government ==
The town follows the Gram Panchayat governing system, in which the sarpanch is the democratically elected head of the town. The Talathi and the Gramsevak are servants who assist the Sarpanch in the pursuit of the town's agenda. Politics have been dominated by the Bhoite since India achieved independence.

== History ==
Flag of the Maratha

Wagholi was historically ruled by a leading Maratha clan from the lineage of the Suryavanshi Kshatriya, named Bhoite. In village Korade and Bhoites were Deshmukhs of Pargana (Taluka) Wagholi in the Prant Wai. Wagholi was an important town of Raygad Ghera; it and nearby Phaltan were the centers of the prominent ruling chiefs of Chhatrapati Shivaji. The Bhoites and Wagholi residents were active in the anti-British movements for the freedom of India. The Wagholi used to be referred to as Sammat in the names of other villages, because in the history of Marathas, the word "Sammat" denotes a Sarkar or Pargana under Bahamani Sultanates.

A Parallel government (called Prati-Sarkar in Marathi) was formed in 1943 under the leadership of Krantisinh Nana Patil to fight against British rule. Many freedom fighters from Satara had actively participated in the Prati-Sarkar movement. During that time a meeting of freedom fighters was held in Wagholi (Satara) under the leadership of Ramanand Swami Mysorkar. He urged the people of wagholi region to organise, force government servants to resign and form a Parallel government. He also advocated non-payment of land revenue. The Korade’s family are very good farming and independent all families play an important role in developing of village.
