= Presidency School =

Presidency School(s) is managed by Abdul Hameed Memorial Educational Trust, Bangalore, which was founded by Abdul Hameed, who belonged to a family of Indian revolutionaries and educators. The present chairman of the trust is Nissar Ahmed who is assisted by Thangadurai, the Director, Presidency Group of Schools and the members of the trust in the efficient day-to-day functioning of the schools under its banner. The management is guided by the philosophy as laid down by its founders. Other branches of the school include Presidency School Mangalore, Presidency School RT Nagar (Best School Award, Education Today), Presidency School Nandini Layout and Presidency School Kasturinagar.

== See also ==
- Presidency PU College Mangalore
- Presidency College, Bangalore
- Florence Public School
