= Heritage Girls School Udaipur =

Girls School in Udaipur, Rajasthan

Coordinates: 24.734656°N 73.7196343°E

Heritage Girls School is an English-medium fully boarding school for girls, located near Eklingji, in Udaipur, Rajasthan, India. The school is affiliated with the Central Board of Secondary Education (CBSE), Cambridge International Examinations (CIE) and is ranked as top 10 boarding schools in India by Education World. The School admits girls from classes IV to IX & XI. Heritage Girls School has been featured in Forbes India's marquee edition - Great Indian Schools 2019 by Great Place to Study.

== History ==
Heritage Girls School Udaipur was founded in 2014 by Jaswant Bhandari, Tushar Bhandari and the Director Shriyans Bhandari.

== Campus ==
The school campus on 12.5 acres of land. The school is equipped with laboratories, an activities centre where students learn music, dance, art and craft, and a modern sports complex comprising half-Olympic size swimming pool, a fitness centre and court for lawn tennis, badminton, cricket, and table tennis, and a 200 meters athletic track.

Six editions of TEDx Youth has been organised by Heritage Girls School's students and staff for six consecutive years 2017 to 2023 except for the year 2020, due to COVID 19

Every year school conducts International and National events like National Cooking Competition, Duke of Edinburgh Award (IAYP), Trinity College of Music, London, Model United Nations (HGS-MUN), Academic Exhibition, Heritage Challenge Women’s Soccer tournament and Women’s Cricket tournament.

Heritage Girls School dedicates every academic year to the study of one country exposed to the art, history, geography, culture and cuisine of countries like Spain, South Africa, Egypt, France, etc. The grand finale of the project is held on Founder’s Day each year.

== Awards ==
- Udaipur School Awards-2019 for Best Residential School at Udaipur
- Great Indian Schools 2019 by Great Place to Study, according to Forbes India Marquee
- Indian Education Award 2017 for Best Infrastructure of the Year
