= Candor International School =

Location
- Begur – Koppa Road, Hullahalli, Off Bannerghatta Road, Near Electronic City; Bangalore, Karnataka, 560105; India; 12.820198°N 77.621627°E

Information
- Type: International school
- Motto: Preparing for Life
- Established: 2010; 16 years ago
- Chairman: Dr. Suresh Reddy
- Principal: Mr. Ross Ferris
- Gender: Mixed
- International students: Yes
- Classes: Nursery — Grade 12
- Language: English
- Sports: Basketball, Football, Swimming, Skating, Lawn Tennis, Chess, Cricket, Badminton etc.
- Affiliations: IB, IGCSE
- Website: www.candorschool.edu.in

Candor International School is a co-educational international school in Bangalore, Karnataka, India that was established in 2010 by Dr Suresh Reddy, the Founder and Chairperson of Saketh Educational Trust. It is an IB (International Baccalaureate) & IGCSE (CAIE) certified school on a 30-acre campus. The school has 1000 students from 5 nationalities. Candor alumni are part of prestigious national and international universities such as University of California, Berkeley & San Diego, University of Bath, NUS Singapore, Christ University, and National Law School.

== Curriculum ==
Candor International School, Bengaluru offers international curriculum for all three sections - Primary, Middle and High School. The curriculum also integrates Community Service, Special Educational Needs, and Arts and Sports into its curricular programmes.

The sections in Candor are:

- Primary School (Kindergarten - Grade 5): The school is an authorized school for the International Baccalaureate Primary Years Programme (IB PYP).
- Middle School (Grades 6 - 10): The curriculum for Grades 6-10 is drawn up in the light of the Cambridge Assessment International Education (CAIE) programs with grade 10 students appearing for International General Certificate of Secondary Education (IGCSE) examination.
- High School (Grades 11 - 12): Candor offers IBDP and Cambridge AS & A levels for Grade 11 and 12 students. At the end of their 12th grade, students write the IBDP or Cambridge AS & A levels examination. The students plan and undertake various interschool and intra school events that showcase the curricular and co-curricular programs at school.

== Facilities ==
Facilities at the school include a 6-acre (2.4 ha) organic farm, boarding, music studios, science labs and libraries. Sports facilities include basketball courts, tennis courts, football field, cricket pitch, a baby and half Olympic size swimming pool, athletic track and volleyball court. Indoor facilities include table tennis, chess track and carrom.

== Boarding ==
The school provides boarding facilities for students studying in Grade 5 and above. Students can choose from weekly and regular boarding, wherein regular boarders stay on campus during the academic year and weekly boarders reside at school from Monday to Friday and return home during the weekends.

== Awards ==
Candor was featured in Forbes India Marquee Great Indian Schools 2018-19
