= Geography of Mumbai =

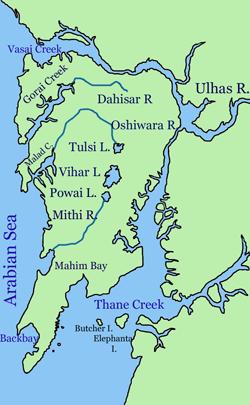
Rivers and lakes of the city

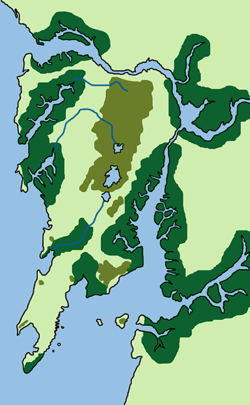
Terrain of the city; dark areas are swampy, medium areas are elevated regions.

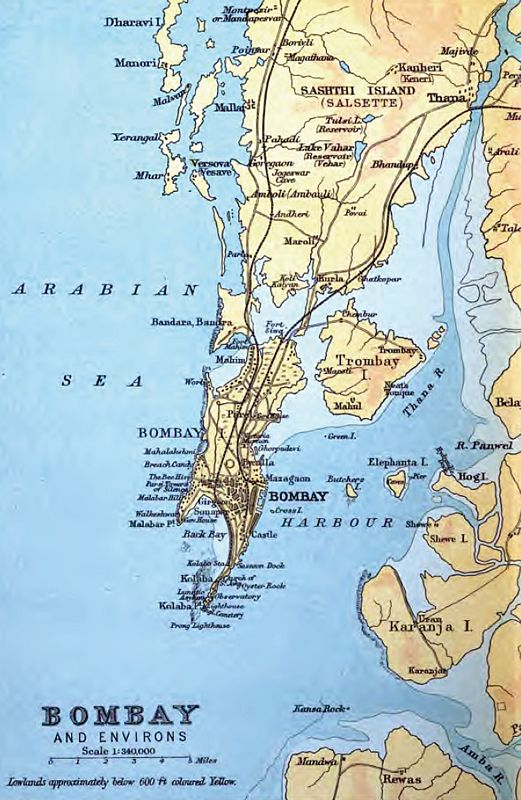
The islands of Mumbai in an 1893 map, before Salsette, Trombay, and Dharavi were merged with Mumbai Island to form Greater Mumbai

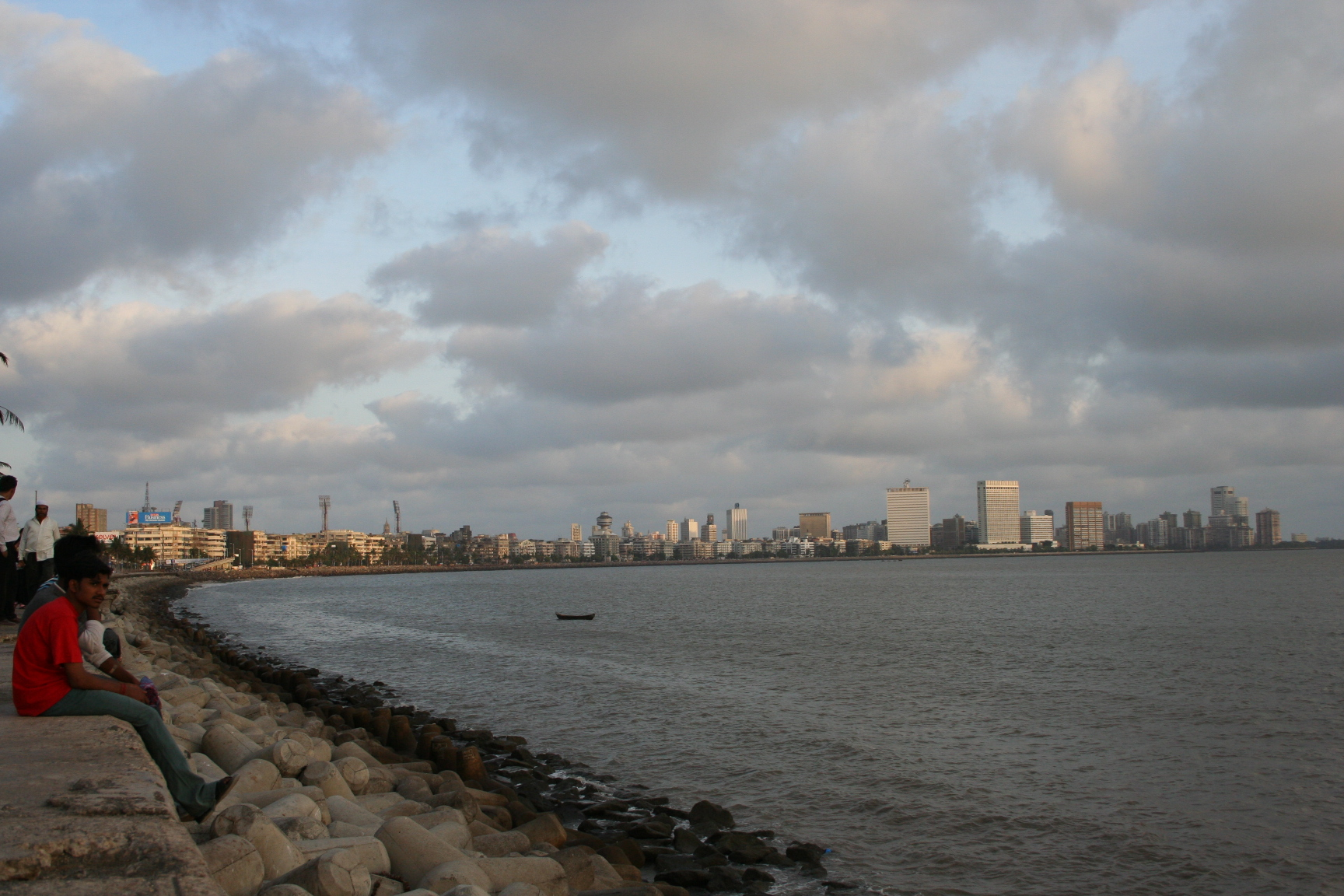
Mumbai skyline as seen from Marine Drive

Mumbai (Bombay) is India's most populous city with a population of 12 million. It is located on Salsette Island off the coast of Maharashtra. The original Seven Islands of Bombay were merged by the British in the 18th century, to form one large island.

== Hills ==
The original Seven Islands of Mumbai consisted of 22 hills. Most of them were razed to fill in the shallows to connect the islands. The hills still standing today are:

- Malabar Hill — the highest point in the city
- Cumbala Hill
- Antop Hill
- Sewri Hill
- Gilbert Hill
- Worli Hill
- Pali Hill
- Mazgaon Hill
- Sion Hill
- Mahakali Hill
- Golanji Hill
- Pulshachi Dongri
- Salamati Hill
- Kanheri Hill

There are three hill ranges within the city limits. The Ghatkopar Hills are present near the station of Ghatkopar. The hill range runs parallel to the Central Railway track and is inhabited by slums. During the monsoon season, landslides are common. The Trombay Hills occupy a large portion of Trombay, on the eastern part of the city. The highest hill is about 302 metres (991 ft) above sea level.

The Powai Hills are present north of the city. The Borivali National Park occupies most of the region. The Vihar and Tulsi Lakes are present within the hills. The highest point of the metropolis, at 450 metres (1,480 ft), is located in this region.

== Lakes ==
There are three lakes in the city. The Vihar Lake, and the Tulsi Lake are present within the National Park, and supply part of the city's drinking water. The Powai Lake, is immediately south of these two. They are located in central Mumbai.

== Bays ==
Back Bay is the largest bay in the city. The coastline of Back Bay is an inverted C-shaped region 4 kilometres in length, and Marine Drive is located along this stretch. North of Marine Drive is Haji Ali Bay which houses the Haji Ali Dargah and further north is the Mahim Bay and the Bandra–Worli Sea Link connects one side of the bay to the other with the Mahim Causeway following the bay to its east connecting Mumbai Suburban district to South Mumbai like the sea link. The bay perimeter is about two kilometres in length.

Mahim Bay is the second largest bay in the city. The Mithi River empties into the Mahim Creek which drains into the Arabic Ocean. The border between the city and its suburbs bisects the bay. To the north lies Bandra, east lies Mahim and to the south, Worli.

== Creeks ==
Mumbai has numerous creeks with close to 71 km^{2} of creeks and mangroves along its coastline. The mangroves adjoin broad tidal mudflats adjacent to the city. The Vasai Creek to the north and Thane Creek to the east separates Salsette Island from the mainland. Within the city the Malad (or Marve) Creek and the Gorai (or Manori) Creek inundate the suburban region. The Mahim Creek forms the border between the two districts. There are also the Mahul Creek and the Mahim Creek.

== Islands ==
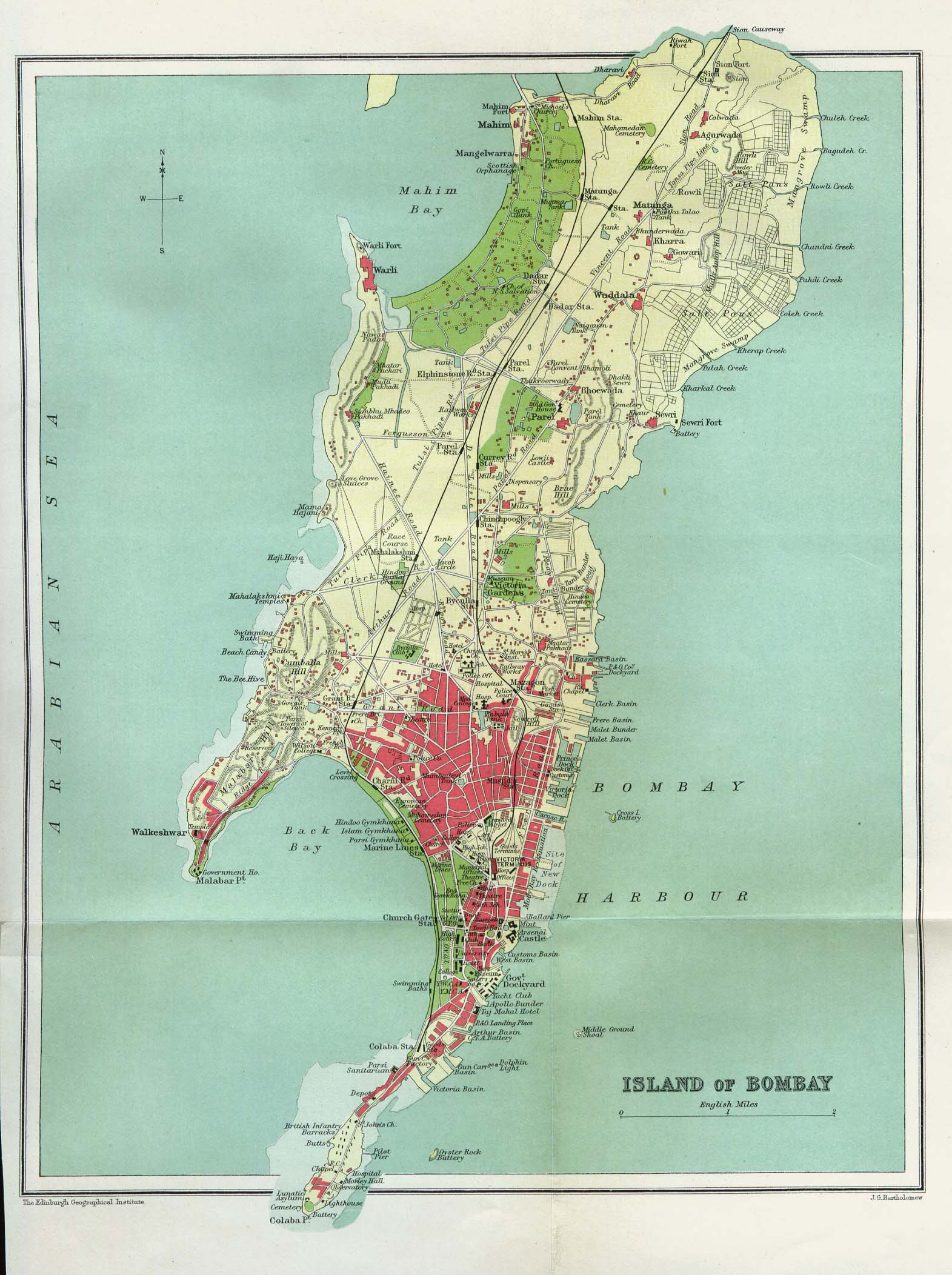
Mumbai in 1909

Although the islands were merged in the 18th century, islands still dot Thane Creek. Elephanta Island, Butcher Island, Oyster Rock, Cross Island and Middle Ground are scattered across the Creek. The latter three are uninhabited islets owned by the Indian Navy.

== Rivers ==
- Dahisar River
- Poisar River
- Chandansar River
- Oshiwara River
- Vakola River
- Gadhi River
- Mahul River (Mahabali-Mahul River)
- Mithi River
