= Tasso River =

Indian waterway in Mumbai

River Tasso is a river in Mumbai (Bombay), India which empties into the Vihar Lake. It originates in the Sanjay Gandhi National Park. In 1872, the plan was made to dam and redirect the river into the Tulsi Lake at a then cost of Rs. 40 lakh (4,000,000).
