= Heptanesia =

Heptanesia (Greek for "cluster of seven islands") can mean:

- Ionian Islands, a group of seven larger and some lesser islands in Greece
- Seven islands of Bombay (Mumbai) in India, named Heptanesia by the Greek geographer Ptolemy
