= Poisar River =

Location
- Country: India
- State: Maharashtra
- City: Mumbai

Physical characteristics
- Source: Sanjay Gandhi National Park
  - location: Mumbai suburban district, India
- Mouth
  - location: Arabian Sea, India
  - coordinates: 19.1833°N 72.833°E
  - elevation: 3 m (9.8 ft)

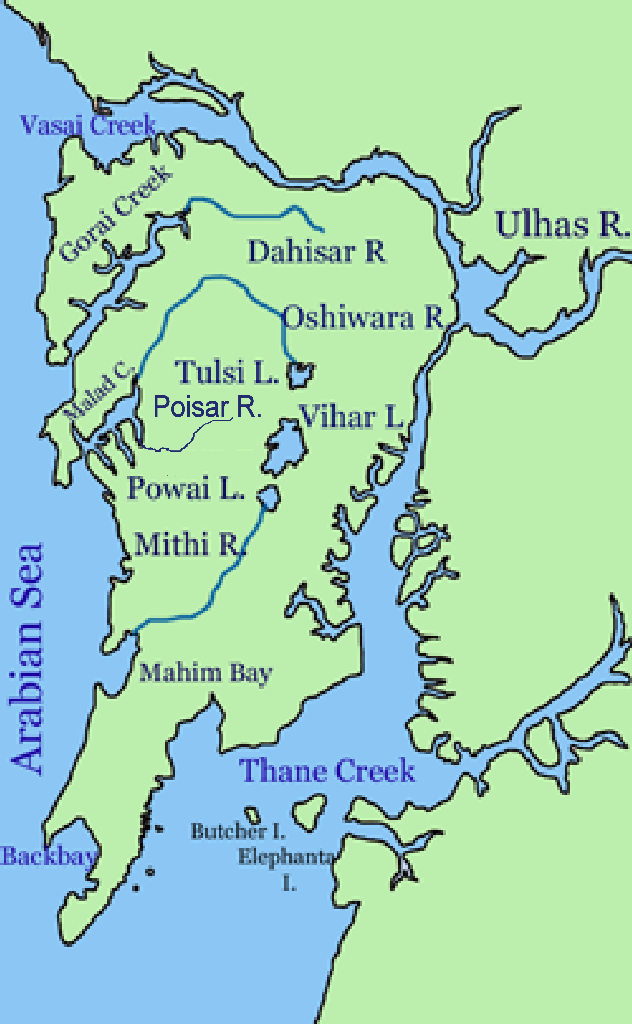
Rivers and Lakes of Mumbai

Poisar River is a river in Mumbai, India. It begins in the Sanjay Gandhi National Park and empties into the Marve Creek and finally into the Arabian Sea. The river is now nothing more than an urban stream when it begins and is contaminated with industrial effluents and sewage.

== History ==
There was a time when the water was clean and the people used it for household purposes. In Mumbai, during the festival of Ganesh Chaturthi, the statue of the Lord Ganapati, was immersed in this river too. Nowadays, it is not done, since the river is dirty.

In 2005 during the major flood in Mumbai, Poisar river had flooded, and water overflowed the banks into a building compound, contaminating a water tank. Those living in the surroundings had undergone great distress following an outbreak of various waterborne diseases.

== Structures ==
There is also the Jeri Meri Temple, on the other side of the Bridge.

== See also ==
- List of rivers of India
- Rivers of India
- Seven Islands of Bombay
