= Mumbai Suburban district =

- District of Maharashtra
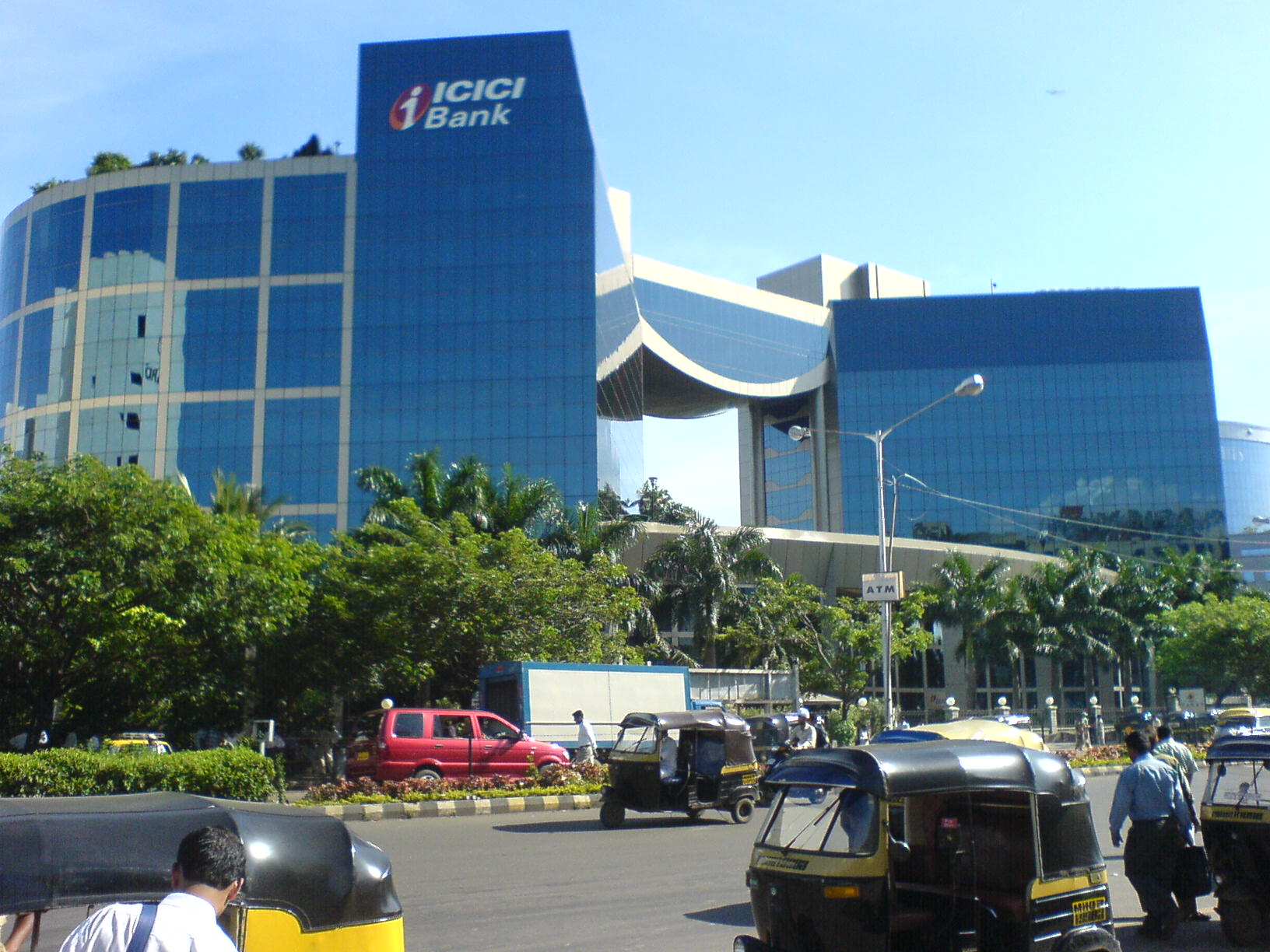
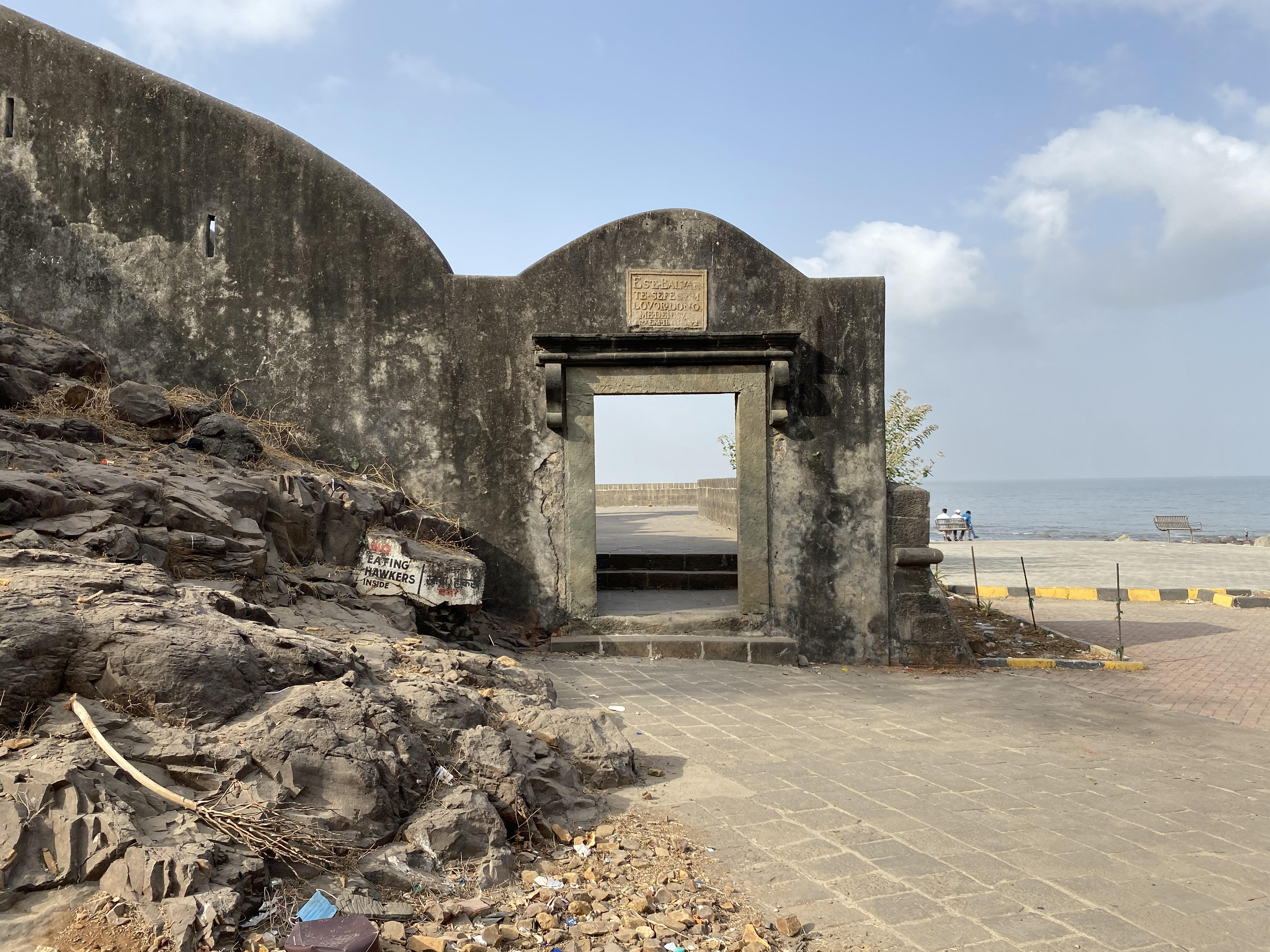
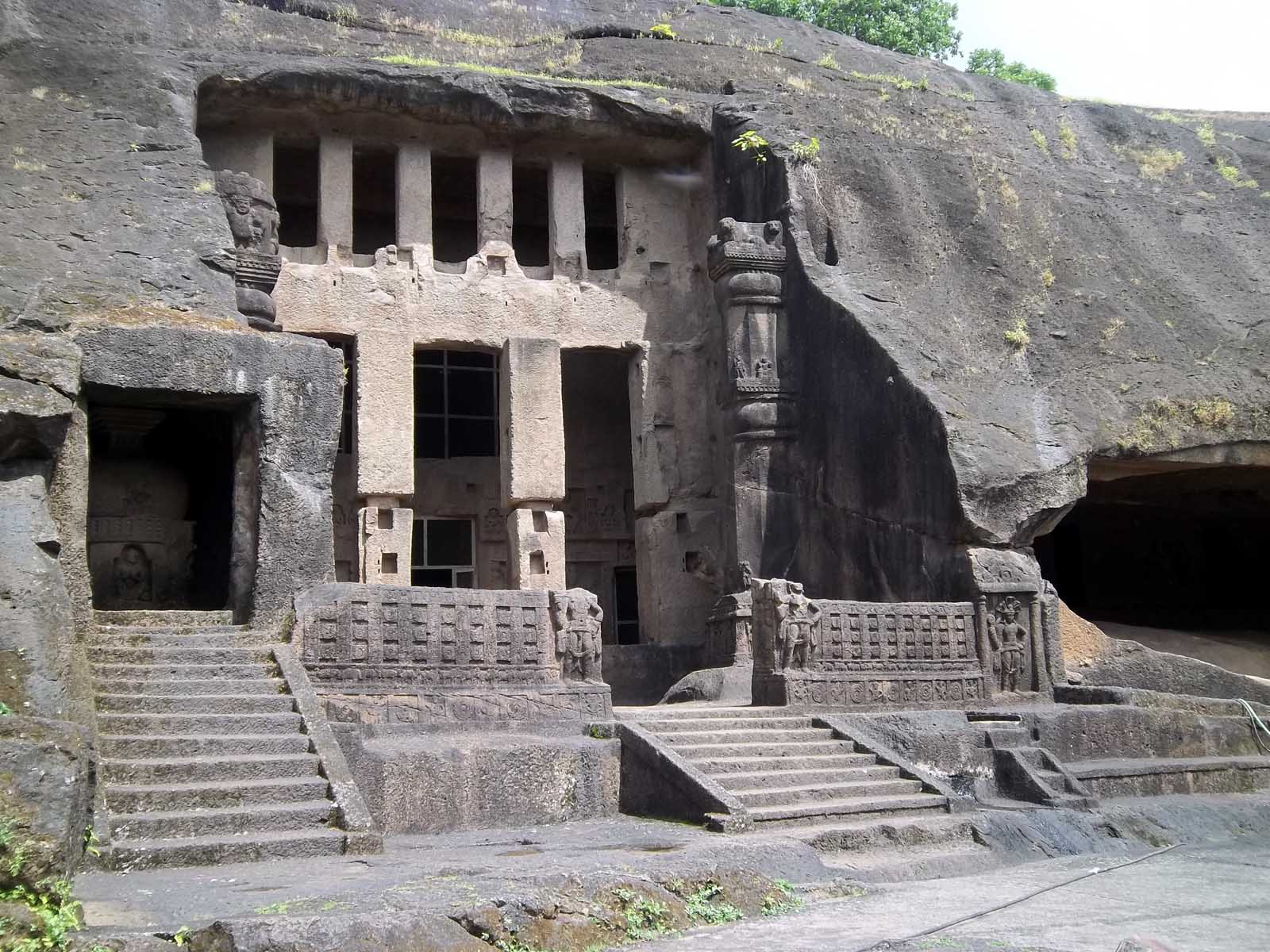
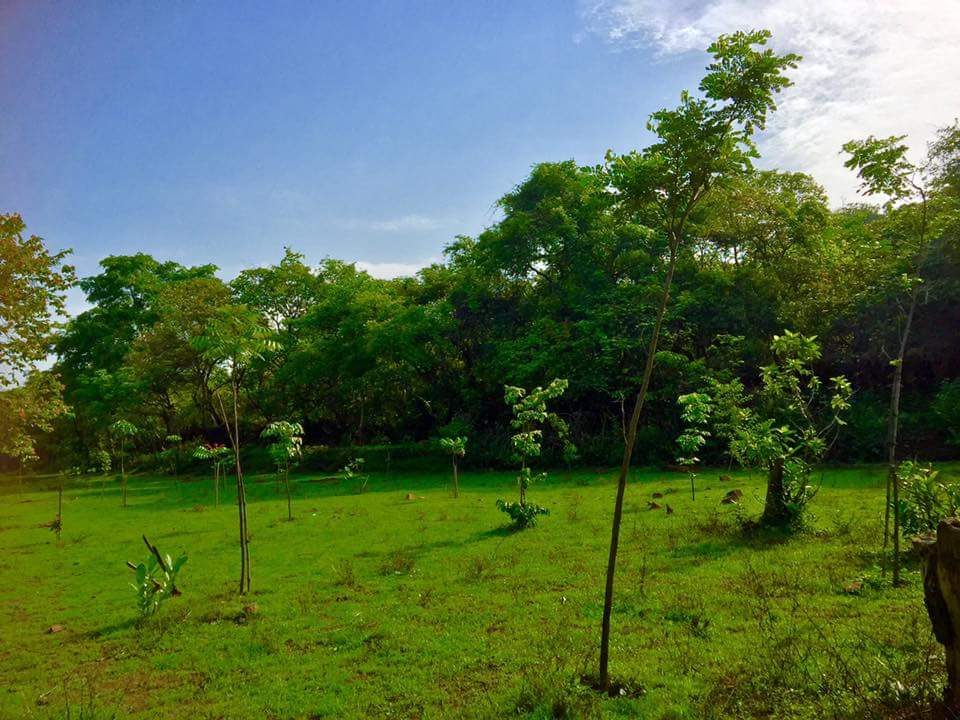
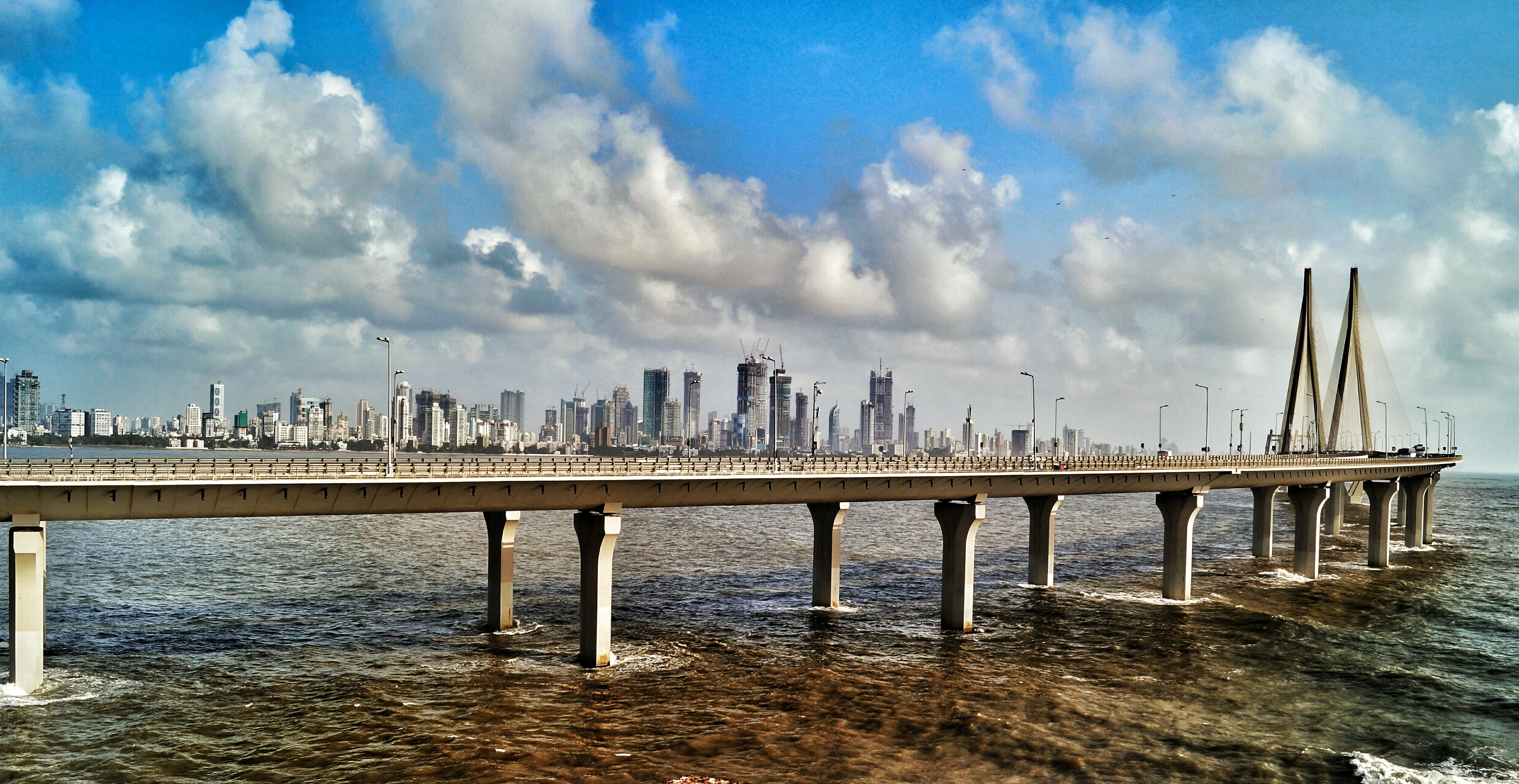
- ICICI Towers, Entrance to Bandra Fort, Aarey Forest, Bandra–Worli Sea Link, Kanheri Caves

- Location in Maharashtra
- Coordinates (Bandra): 19.05°N 72.83°E
- Country: India
- State: Maharashtra
- Division: Konkan
- Headquarters: Bandra
- Tehsils: 1. Kurla, 2. Andheri, 3. Borivali

Government
  - Body: Brihanmumbai Municipal Corporation
  - Guardian Minister: Mangal Lodha; Ashish Shelar(Cabinet Minister Mha)
  - Mayor: Mayor; Deputy Mayor Vacant
  - District Collector: Dr Rajendra Kshirsagar (IAS)
  - Municipal Commissioner & Administrator: Ashwini Bhide (IAS)
  - MPs: Piyush Goyal (Mumbai North); Ravindra Waikar (Mumbai North West); Sanjay Dina Patil (Mumbai North East); Varsha Gaikwad (Mumbai North Central)

Area
  - Total: 446 km^{2} (172 sq mi)

Population (2011)
  - Total: 9,356,962
  - Density: 21,000/km^{2} (54,300/sq mi)
- Time zone: UTC+05:30 (IST)
- PINs: 400010 to 400104
- Major highways: NH-3, NH-8,
- Website: mumbaisuburban.gov.in

Mumbai Suburban district (Marathi: Mumbai Upanagar Jilhā) is the second most populous district of Maharashtra in the Konkan Division. With its administrative headquarters in Bandra, the district consists of three subdivisions or tehsils (townships): Kurla, Andheri, and Borivali. The district along with Mumbai City district and other suburban localities make up Greater Mumbai. The district occupies an area of 446 km^{2} on Salsette Island.

This is the second smallest district of Maharashtra, and the jurisdiction of Mumbai Suburban district extends from Bandra to Dahisar, from Kurla to Mulund, and from Kurla up to Trombay creek. The district is one of the largest in the country by population. The current population is 9,356,962, according to the 2011 census of India, making it the fifth most populous district in India (out of 672). The Mithi River is the main river in the district.

== Talukas ==
The district has three tehsils or talukas:

- Andheri
- Borivali
- Kurla

Proposed talukas include:

- Bandra
- Malad
- Gorai
- Chembur
- Ghatkopar
- Bhandup
- Mulund

== Officer ==
=== Members of Parliament ===
- Piyush Goyal (BJP)
  (Mumbai North)
- Ravindra Waikar (SS)
  (Mumbai North West)
- Sanjay Dina Patil (SS (UBT))
  (Mumbai North East)
- Varsha Gaikwad (INC)
  (Mumbai North Central)

=== Guardian Minister ===
Guardian Minister Mumbai Suburban
- पालकमंत्री मुंबई उपनगर
- Emblem of India
- Incumbent; Mangal Lodha since 24 September 2022
- Style: The Honourable
- Appointer: Chief Minister of Maharashtra
- Term length: 5 years / No time limit
- Website: mumbaisuburban.gov.in/en/

==== list of Guardian Minister ====
Name	Term of office
Vinod Tawde	31 October 2014 - 8 November 2019
Aaditya Thackeray	9 January 2020 - 29 June 2022
Mangal Lodha	24 September 2022 - Incumbent

=== District Magistrate/Collector ===
District Magistrate / Collector Mumbai City
- जिल्हाधिकारी तथा जिल्हदंडाधिकरी मुंबई उपनगर
- Emblem of India
- Incumbent; Ms. Nidhi Chaudhary (IAS) since 23 August 2021
- Residence: At Mumbai Suburban district
- Appointer: Government of Maharashtra
- Term length: No time limit
- Website: mumbaisuburban.gov.in/en/

==== list of District Magistrate / Collector ====
Name	Term of office
Ms. Nidhi Chaudhary (IAS)	23 August 2021 - Incumbent

== History ==
Mumbai Suburban district was created on 1 October 1990 when Mumbai district was bifurcated into Mumbai City and Mumbai Suburban districts.

== Geography ==
Many important places have adorned the beauty of this district, including Mount Mary Church, Jogeshwari Caves, Mahakali Caves, Essel World, Water Kingdom, Marve Beach, Aksa Beach, Madh Island, Sanjay Gandhi National Park, Aarey Colony, Kanheri Caves, Film City, Tulsi Lake, Vihar Lake and Powai Lake.

=== Climate ===
Mumbai

Climate chart (precipitation, max. and min. temperature)
J	F	M	A	M	J	J	A	S	O	N	D
0.2 31 17	0.2 32 18	0.1 33 21	0.1 33 24	7.3 34 27	526 33 27	920 30 26	561 30 25	384 31 25	91 34 24	11 34 21	1.6 33 18
- █ Average max. and min. temperatures in °C
- █ Precipitation totals in mm
Imperial conversion
J	F	M	A	M	J	J	A	S	O	N	D
0 88 62	0 89 65	0 92 70	0 92 76	0.3 93 81	21 91 80	36 87 78	22 86 77	15 88 77	3.6 92 75	0.4 93 71	0.1 91 65
- █ Average max. and min. temperatures in °F
- █ Precipitation totals in inches

== Demographics ==
Historical population
Year	Pop.	±% p.a.
1901	206,218	—
1911	255,276	+2.16%
1921	306,763	+1.85%
1931	310,621	+0.13%
1941	400,297	+2.57%
1951	665,424	+5.21%
1961	1,380,123	+7.57%
1971	2,900,197	+7.71%
1981	4,958,365	+5.51%
1991	6,751,002	+3.13%
2001	8,640,419	+2.50%
2011	9,356,962	+0.80%

According to the 2011 census, Mumbai Suburban district has a population of 9,356,962, roughly equal to the nation of Benin or the US state of North Carolina. This gives it a ranking of 5th in India (out of a total of 640). The district has a population density of 25,291.28 inhabitants per square kilometre (65,504.1/sq mi). Its population growth rate over the decade 2001-2011 was 8.01%. Mumbai Suburban has a sex ratio of 857 females for every 1000 males, and a literacy rate of 90.9%. Scheduled Castes and Scheduled Tribes make up 6.23% and 1.12% of the population respectively.

=== Religion ===
Religion in Mumbai Suburban district (2011)
1. Hinduism (67.8%)
2. Islam (19.2%)
3. Buddhism (5.00%)
4. Jainism (3.70%)
5. Christianity (3.45%)
6. Sikhism (0.50%)
7. Others (0.40%)

=== Languages ===
Languages in Mumbai Suburban district (2011)
1. Marathi (35.2%)
2. Hindi (25.4%)
3. Gujarati (11.5%)
4. Urdu (11.1%)
5. Tamil (2.18%)
6. Bhojpuri (1.98%)
7. Konkani (1.63%)
8. Marwadi (1.61%)
9. Telugu (1.39%)
10. Malayalam (1.15%)
11. Tulu (1.15%)
12. Bengali (1.08%)
13. Sindhi (0.94%)
14. Punjabi (0.93%)
15. Others (2.73%)

Marathi is the most spoken language. Hindi is the second most-spoken language and the fastest growing, and has become the common language in the district. Urdu is spoken by the Muslim community in the district. Gujarati and Marwari are spoken by the large business communities in the district. Tamil, Bhojpuri, Konkani, Telugu, Malayalam, Tulu and Bengali are minority languages spoken by recent arrivals.

== See also ==
- Western Suburbs
- Eastern Suburbs
- South Mumbai
- Mumbai
