= Powai =

Powai Pawai
- Suburb
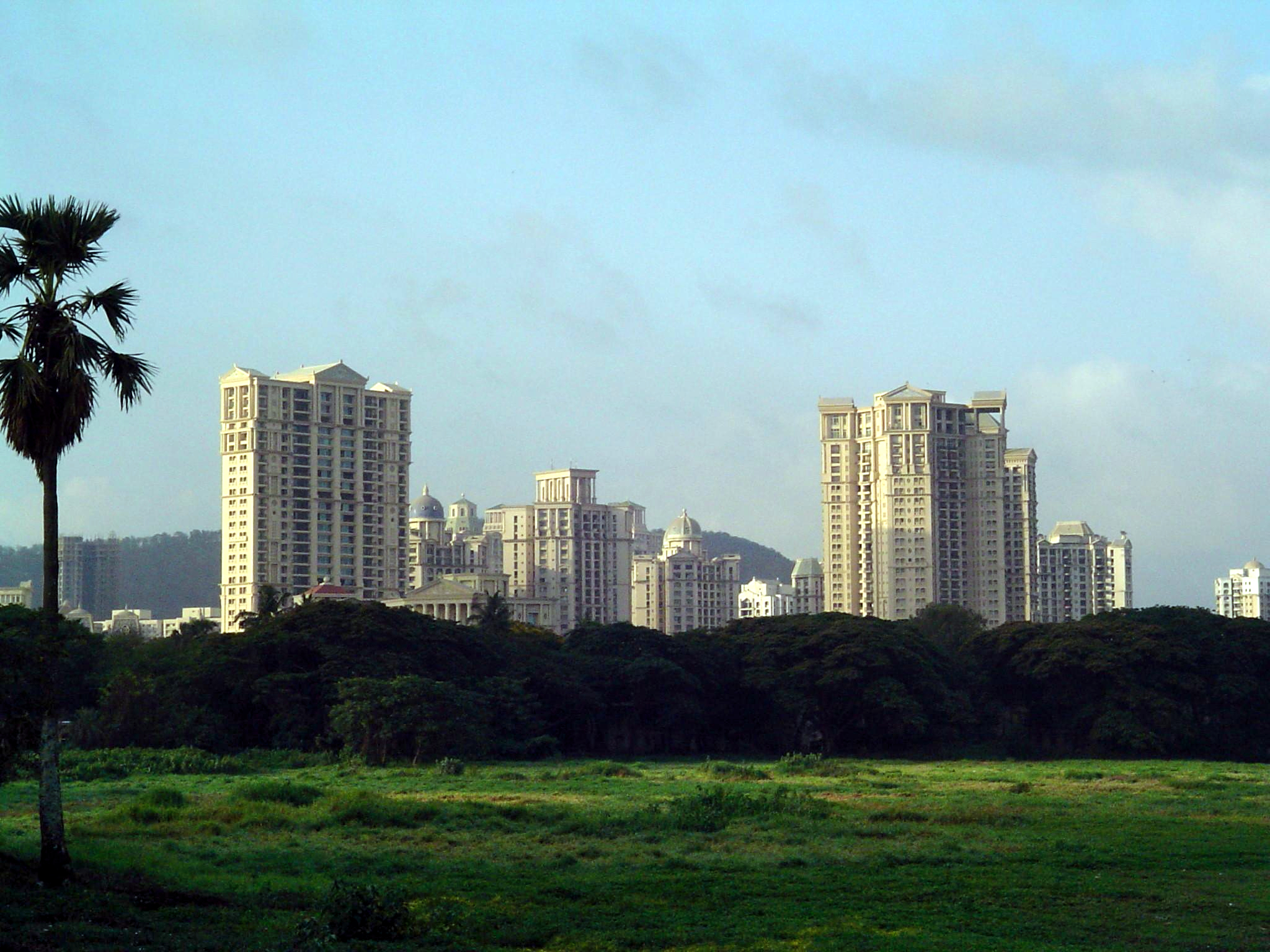
- View of Powai from across the Powai lake, Mumbai (MH)

- Location of Powai in Mumbai (Maharashtra) Powai (Maharashtra) Powai (India)
- Coordinates: 19.12°N 72.91°E
- Country: India
- State: Maharashtra
- District: Mumbai Suburban
- City: Mumbai
- Zone: 5
- Ward: S

Government
  - Type: Municipal Corporation
  - Body: Brihanmumbai Municipal Corporation (MCGM)
- Elevation: 50 m (160 ft)

Languages
  - Official: Marathi
- Time zone: UTC+5:30 (IST)
- PIN: 400076 (IIT Bombay area), 400087 ((IIM Mumbai)), 400072 (Saki Vihar, Chandivali)
- Area code: 022
- Vehicle registration: MH-03
- Lok Sabha constituency: Mumbai North East (part); Mumbai North Central (part)
- Vidhan Sabha constituency: Bhandup West (part); Chandivali (part)

Powai (pronounced [pəʋəiː]) is a residential suburb located in central Mumbai, Maharashtra, India. It is situated on the banks of Powai Lake, and is bound by the hills of Vikhroli Parksite to the south-east, Chandivali to the south-west, the L.B.S. Marg (old Mumbai-Agra road) to the north-east and the Sanjay Gandhi National Park to the north beyond the lake. The Jogeshwari-Vikhroli Link Road, one of the city's busiest thoroughfares linking the western and eastern suburbs, passes through Powai. The place also hosts thousands of devotees every year during the Ganesh Chaturthi festival for the visarjan processions.

The Indian Institute of Technology, Bombay, established in 1958 and currently the second oldest campus of the Indian Institutes of Technology as well as the Indian Institute of Management Mumbai, established in 1963 are both located here, as is a campus of the Bombay Scottish School. Powai is also home to residential complexes of the Income Tax department, Customs and NTPC, as well as those of ex-servicemen. Powai houses schools and colleges, some of which are S M Shetty School and College, Gopal Sharma School and Chandrabhan Sharma College. Chandivali has Sinhgad College of Management. The new school includes Pawar Public School towards Chandivali. Some of the Temples of Powai are Chinmaya Mission's Jagadeshwara Shiva Temple, Sri Ayyappa Vishnu Temple at Hiranandani, and Devi Vageshwari Mata Temple at Chandivali. Powai also hosts a community birthday havan.

Powai is also Mumbai's start-up hub, with young entrepreneurs like the Hiranandanis starting from incubation cells set up by institutes such as IIT Bombay from the tech industry and other sectors setting their bases there, causing the area to be referred to as India's Powai Valley. As a result of the mixture of various communities living together, the suburb has one of the city's most cosmopolitan and modernized cultures. The place has a vibrant night-life, and shoots for several Bollywood as well as Hollywood movies, such as Kalyug, Ghajini, Slumdog Millionaire, Mardaani and Haseena Maan Jaayegi have taken place there. The Hiranandani Gardens are also known for their neoclassical architectural style and the area has some of the tallest residential buildings in Suburban Mumbai. The suburb is also known for being one of the preferred residential areas for expats in Mumbai.

== Geography ==
Powai is a part of the Mumbai Suburban District, located in the north-eastern region of what is today considered to be the modern Mumbai metropolis. Administratively, it is a part of the Kurla tehsil and much of the area falls within the boundaries of the S-ward, the largest ward in Mumbai. Powai is situated on the banks of its namesake lake and boasts of a recently revamped, landscaped garden with viewing decks, a children's play area and synchronized fountains. The privately run Dr. L. H. Hiranandani Hospital, located within the Hiranandani residential complex, is the first superspeciality hospital in the area.

As a result of prolific construction activity in the last two decades, the area has one of the highest residential population densities^{note 1} in suburban Mumbai. The development in the region has, however, hurt the environment, with the area facing the ill-effects of excessive concretisation, resulting in a shrinking number of open spaces, green cover and rising pollution levels.

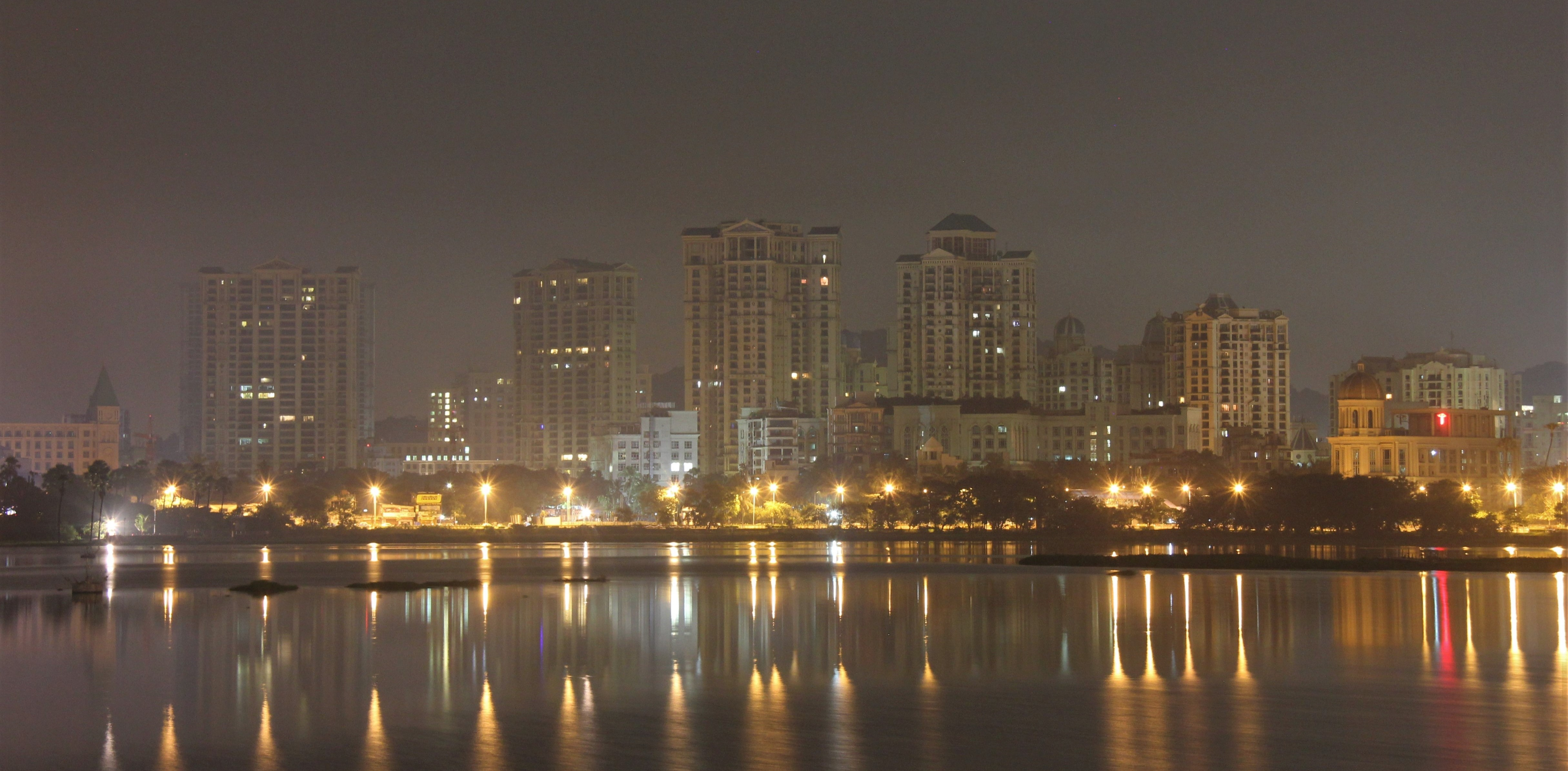
Hiranandani Gardens skyline (seen from Powai Lake).

=== Lake ===
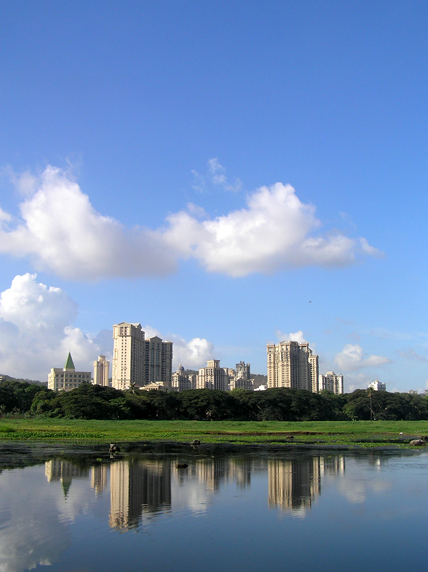
The Powai Lake gives the area its name, and is one of the three lakes located within Mumbai.

Perhaps the best-known landmark of Powai is the Powai Lake, a 120-year-old lake that was originally used to supply water to the city of Mumbai, and is today used as an industrial sewage outlet. Another prominent landmark that most outsiders associate Powai with is the IIT Bombay, located to the east of the lake. The campus of the NITIE is located near the north bank of the lake, as is the Renaissance Hotel and Convention centre, part of the Marriott group of hotels, with its distinctive facade visible across the Powai lake. In the past, fishing and bird-watching were popular recreational activities that took place along the shores of the lake. Rare migration birds were known to visit the lake each year, and the lake boasted a variety of fish species. Crocodiles have also been spotted alongside the lake. However, the rapid and uncontrolled growth of the region in recent years has hurt the flora and fauna found in and around the lake. In its day, the lake used to be an idyllic picnic spot for people wanting to get away from the hustle and bustle of city life.

== History ==
The name "Powai" originates from Padmavati, a Hindu deity to whom a temple was dedicated in the village existing on the contemporary space of the neighbourhood. In 1826, after the death of the previous owner of the estate, the area that is now Powai was leased to Parsi merchant Framji Kavasji. The water body at the centre of the neighbourhood that is now known as Powai Lake was a result of initiatives by city authorities in the 1890s to increase urban water supply. In 1943, four years before India's independence, the freedom fighters Chandrabhan Sharma & Ram Nath Grover arrived in Mumbai and happened to lease and subsequently buy Powai Estate from Sir Yusuf, the then owner, for a paltry sum. At that time, Powai comprised five villages: Saki, Kopri, Tirandaz, Powai and Paspauli. In the late 1950s, a portion of Powai was given to the government to set up an Indian Institute of Technology (IIT). The Prime Minister, Jawaharlal Nehru, personally visited the area and, during a meeting, Chandrabhan Sharma was motivated by him to give the land free of cost for this purpose. Simultaneously, a young engineer from Denmark, Søren Kristian Toubro, had obtained a major contract in Mumbai. As a result, vast tracts of land were leased to him by Mr. Sharma to set up what would become Larsen & Toubro.

== See also ==
- Hiranandani Gardens
- Mumbai metropolitan area
- Powai Lake
