= Tulsi Lake =

Lake in India

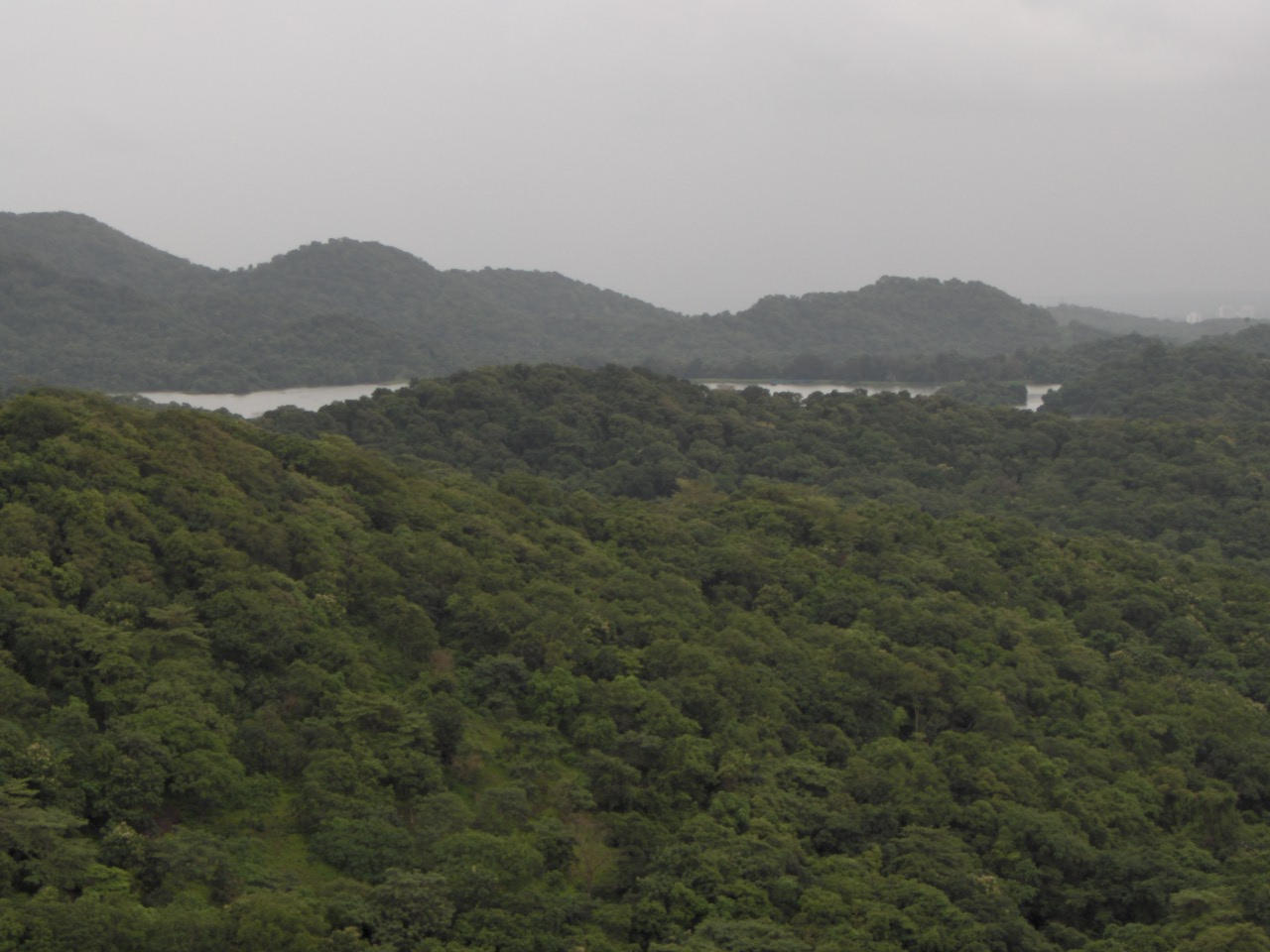

- Location within Mumbai
- Location: Sanjay Gandhi National Park
- Coordinates: 19.1901°N 72.9179°E
- Catchment area: 6.76 km^{2} (2.61 sq mi)
- Basin countries: India
- Surface area: 1.35 km^{2} (0.52 sq mi)
- Average depth: 12 m (39 ft) (average)
- Water volume: 2,294×10^{6} imp gal (10,430,000 m^{3})
- Surface elevation: 139.17 m (456.6 ft)
- Islands: Salsette
- Settlements: Mumbai

Tulsi Lake is a fresh water lake in northern Mumbai. It is stated to be the second largest lake in Mumbai and supplies part of the city's potable water. Tulsi is one of the three lakes in Salsette Island; the other two being Powai Lake and Vihar Lake. Both Tulsi and Vihar lakes are located within the densely forested Sanjay Gandhi National Park, also known as the Borivali National Park.

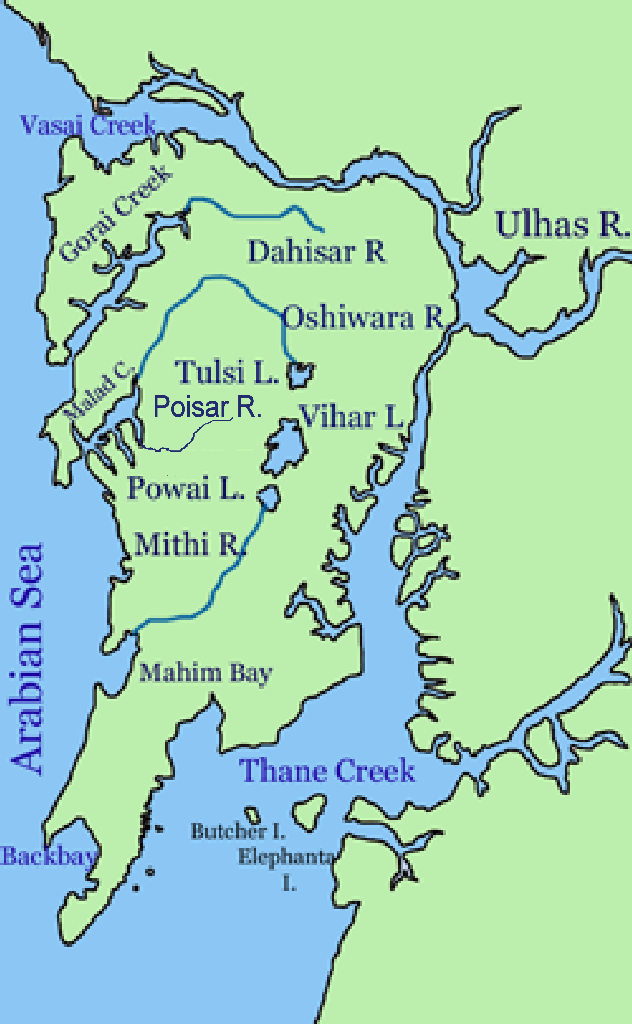
The three contiguous lakes - Vihar Lake, Tulsi Lake and Powai Lake of Mumbai

== Hydrology ==
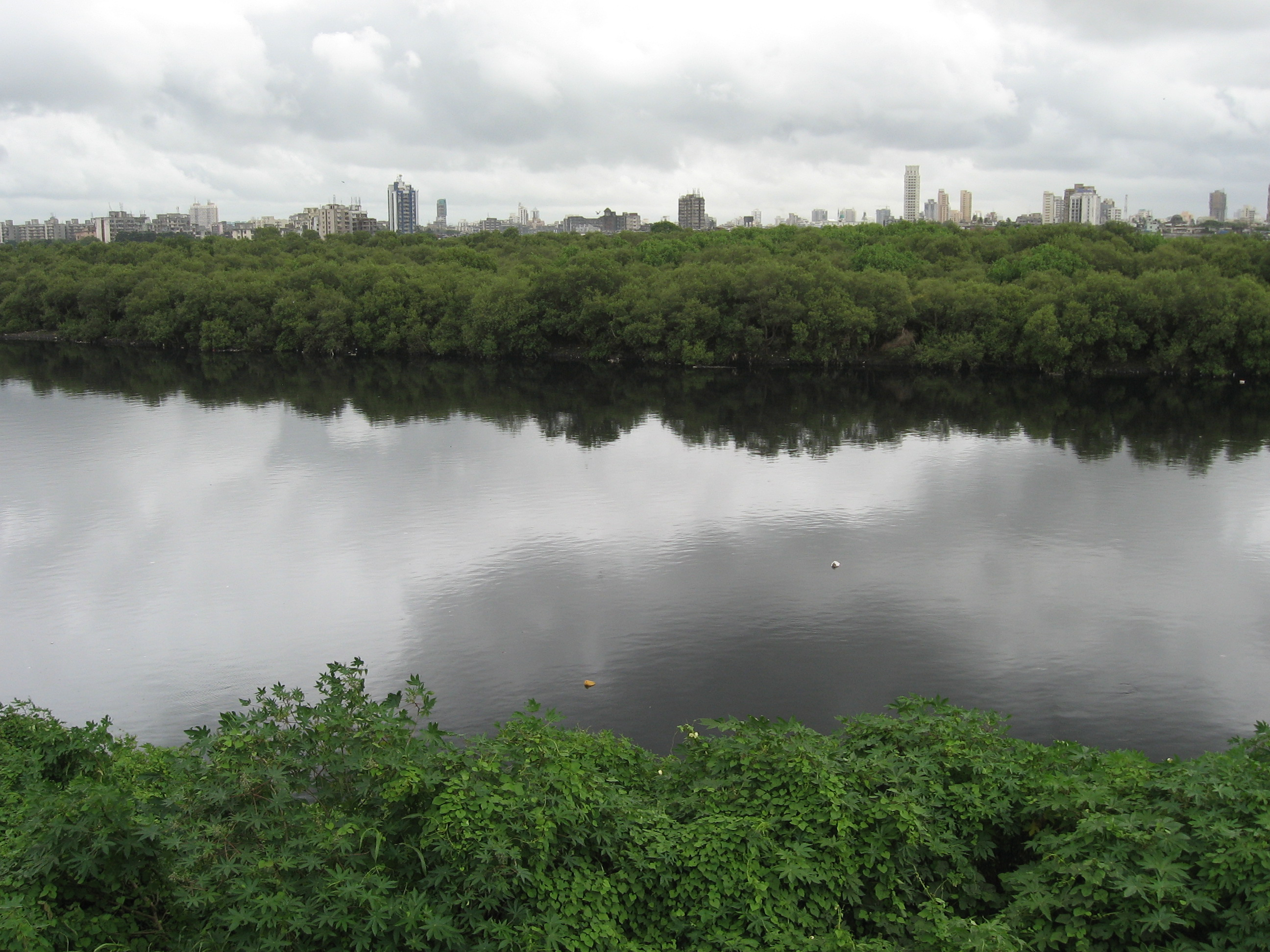
Flood flow from the three lakes outfall into Mithi River

Tulsi Lake was built by damming the River Tasso, and redirecting the flow to the nearby Vihar Lake. Rain water from the catchment area of 676 hectares of the Powai-Kanheri hill ranges drains into the lake. During the rainy season the flood flows out into the Powai Lake and further down into the Mithi River. The maximum height of the hill in the catchment is about 400 m. The southwest monsoon sets in by mid June, and lasts till September. The maximum rainfall is normally recorded in the months of July and August. The mean annual rainfall is reported to be 3000 mm. Rainfall has reportedly crossed 4000 mm several times. The Highest ever recorded rainfall to the figure of 5316 mm have been recorded in the year 2019 (1 June - 30 September).

The plan to create the lake was conceived in 1872 and construction completed 1897. It was designed as a backup for the Vihar Lake to supply portable drinking water to the city of Bombay (now Mumbai). The lake has surface area of 1.35 km^{2} (135 hectares). The average water depth is reported to be 12 m with a gross storage at Full Supply Level (FSL) of 2,294 million imperial gallons (10,430,000 m^{3}), out of which 4 million imperial gallons (18,000 m^{3}) per day are supplied to Greater Mumbai.

The highest overflow level, recorded at the dam is 139.17 m (456.6 ft).This fresh water lake primarily fulfills the water requirement of the southern part of Mumbai.

== Access ==
The lake is located 32 km to the north of Mumbai by road. The nearest suburban electric train station is Borivli East on the Western Railways and is close to western express highway, with a further travel of 6 km from the station by road to the lake. The nearest Sahar International Airport is at a distance of about 20 km. As the lake is located inside the Sanjay Gandhi National Park, entry permits are to be obtained from the park authorities for visit to the lake.

== Flora and fauna ==
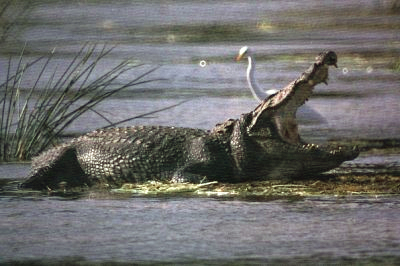
Mugger or Marsh Crocodile

The vegetation on the hill slopes draining into the lake is thick and lush, undisturbed and of mixed moist deciduous type. The lake and its catchment are protected by the Brihanmumbai Municipal Corporation and Sanjay Gandhi National Park Authority. As the lake is situated inside the Sanjay Gandhi National Park, the flora and fauna reported for the park would be relevant to the lake. However, fresh water crocodiles Mugger or Marsh crocodiles (Crocodilus palustris) are known to inhabit the lake in sustainable numbers. As it is difficult to sight them in the lake, the park has set up a Crocodile Park’ to view the reptiles of different sizes.

== See also ==
- Mumbai's water sources
- Vihar Lake
- Powai Lake
- Salsette
- Sanjay Gandhi National Park
