= Mithi River =

River in Mumbai, India

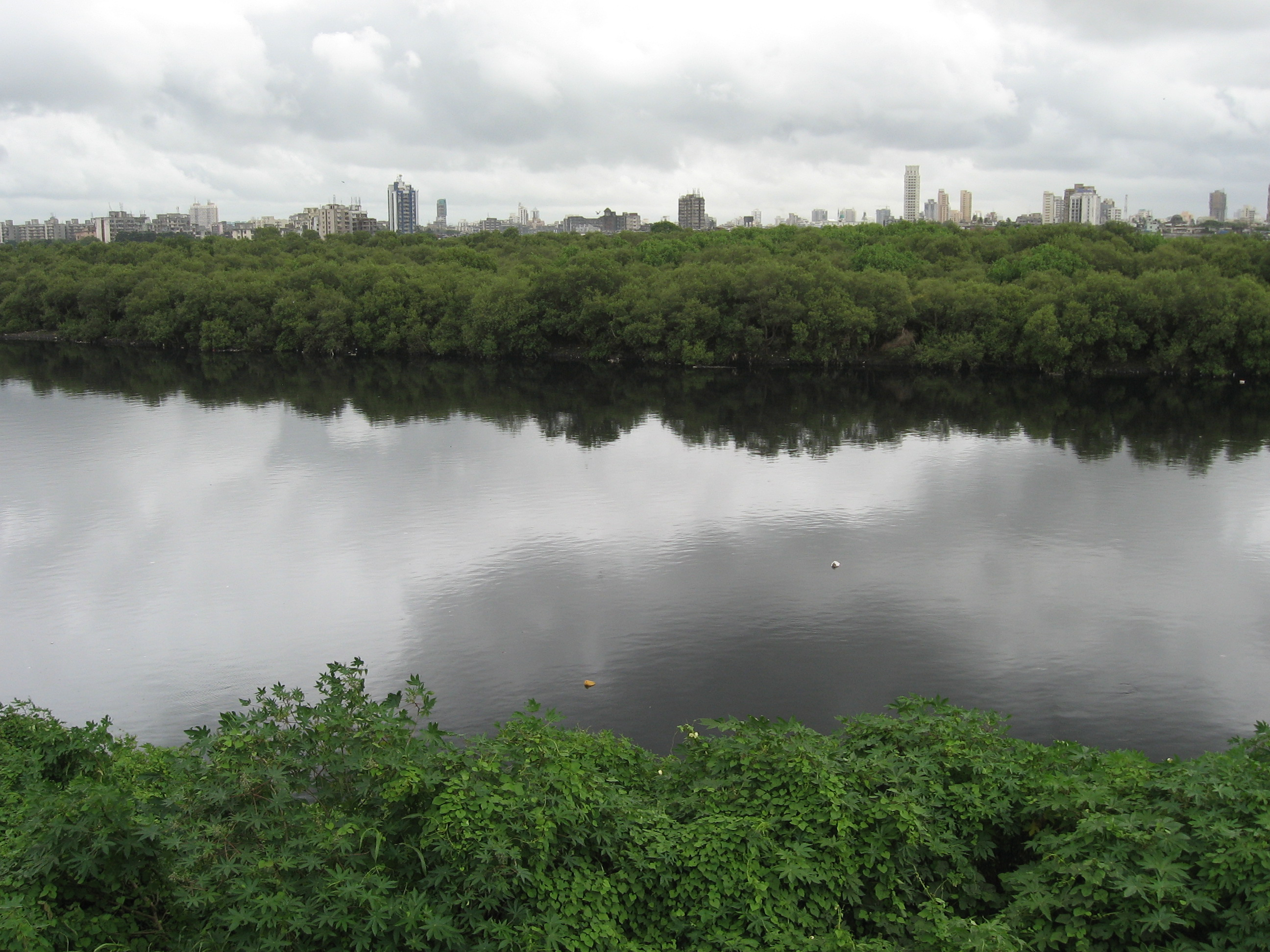
- Mithi River at Filter Pada

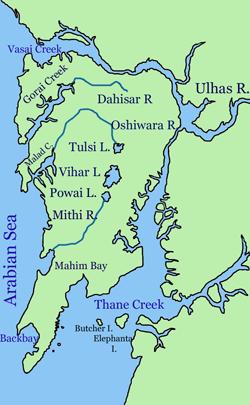
- The Mithi river is in the centre

Location
- Country: India
- State: Maharashtra
- District: Mumbai Suburban
- City: Mumbai

Physical characteristics
- Source: Vihar Lake
- 2nd source: Powai Lake
  - location: Aarey Colony, Goregaon (E)
- 3rd source: Vakola Creek
  - location: Chhatrapati Shivaji Maharaj International Airport
- Mouth: Arabian Sea
  - location: Mahim Creek
- Length: 18 km (11 mi)

The Mithi River (Pronunciation: [miʈʰiː]) is a river on Salsette Island, the island of the city of Mumbai, India. The Mithi is the confluence of the tail-water discharges of the Powai and Vihar lakes. The river is seasonal and rises during the monsoon. The overflowing lakes also contribute to the river's flow, which is stopped by a dam at other times.

== Geography ==
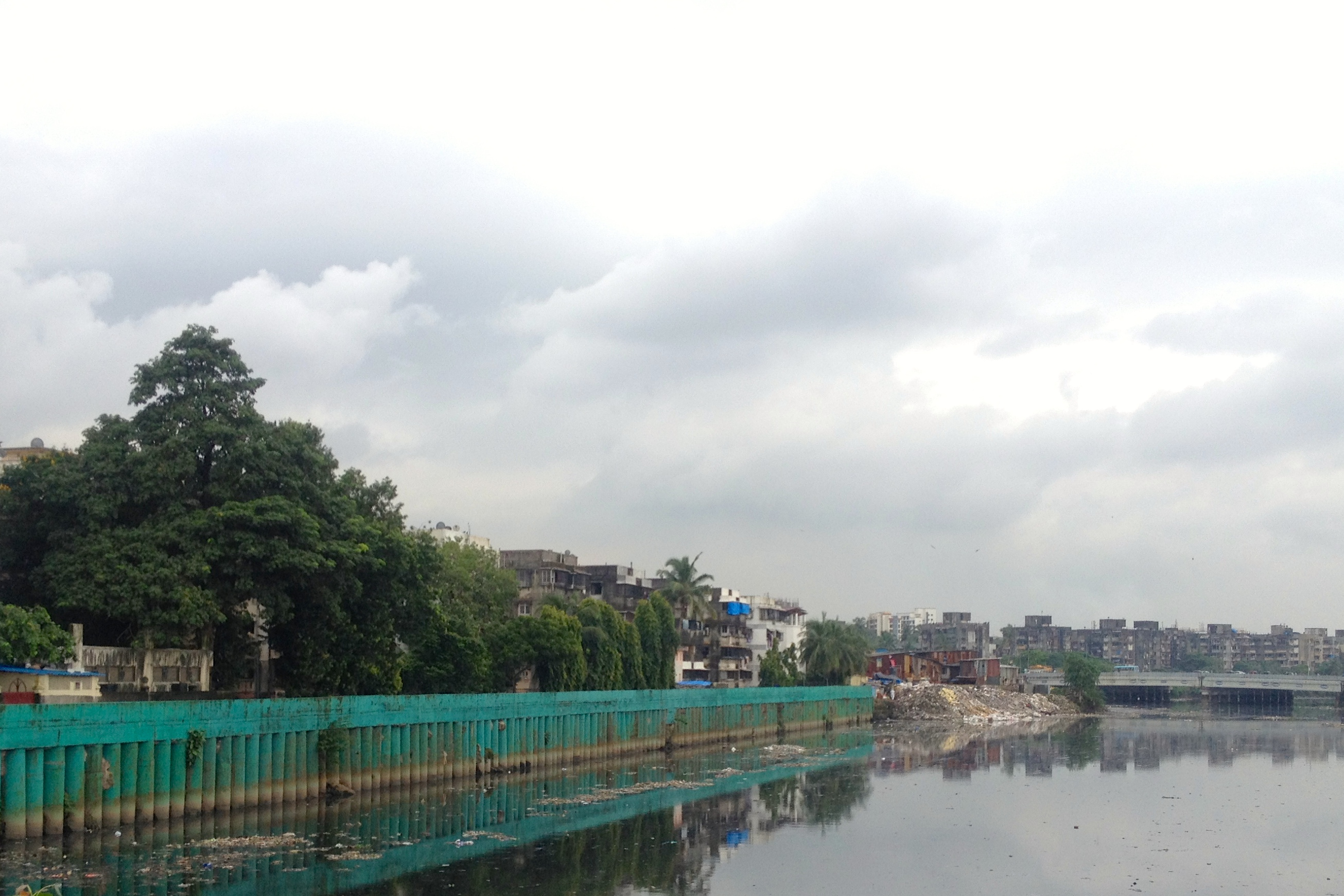
Mithi river in Mumbai showing the concrete pillars used in increasing its width

The river originates from the overflow of the Vihar Lake and also receives the overflows from the Powai Lake, about 2 km downstream. It flows for 18 km before discharging into the Arabian Sea at Mahim Creek, flowing through the residential and industrial complexes of Powai, Saki Naka, Kurla, Kalina, Vakola, Bandra Kurla Complex, Dharavi, and Mahim. The river has an average width of 5 metres in the upper reaches, and has been widened to 25 m, in the middle reaches and up to 70 m in the lower reaches after the 26 July 2005 deluge (944 mm in 24 h on 26 July 2005).

== Environmental degradation ==
The river has been polluted by the dumping of raw sewage, industrial waste, and municipal waste into the river. Besides this, illegal activities like washing vessels, animals, and oily drums, discharge of unauthorised hazardous waste are also carried out along the course of this river. Cattle sheds in some areas contribute to animal waste. Barrel cleaners, scrap dealers, and others dump sludge oil, effluent, and garbage in the river. The organic waste, sludge, and garbage dumping has reduced the carrying capacity of the river. The water with mixture of sewage and industrial waste is a threat to marine life. The river bed is full of sludge, garbage, and vegetation growth like water hyacinth in many parts.

== Cleanup ==
The Municipal Corporation of Greater Mumbai has undertaken a cleanliness drive lately so that the floods of 26 July 2005 are not repeated. An environmental group has been formed by Rajendra Singh, an award-winning conservationist in 2009. The BMC has been able to remove just 267,000 cubic metres so far, or 60% of what is required.

== Development ==
Many young entrepreneurs in and around Mumbai are now aggressively involved with raising awareness of the degradation of the Mithi River, and creating awareness on a global scale, as the government of India has again begun to ignore this extremely important issue. In 2009, environmentalist and Magsaysay Award winner, Rajendra Singh, led a yatra, of a group of environmentalists and NGOs, through Mumbai city along the degraded Mithi River to highlight its problems.

A Contemporary Art show was also held in 2009 to increase awareness of the dire situation of the Mithi River in Bombay by Chintan Upadhyay titled Khatti – Mithi.

== See also ==
- List of rivers of India
- Rivers of India
- Seven Islands of Bombay
