= Seven Islands of Bombay =

16th-century Portuguese colony in India

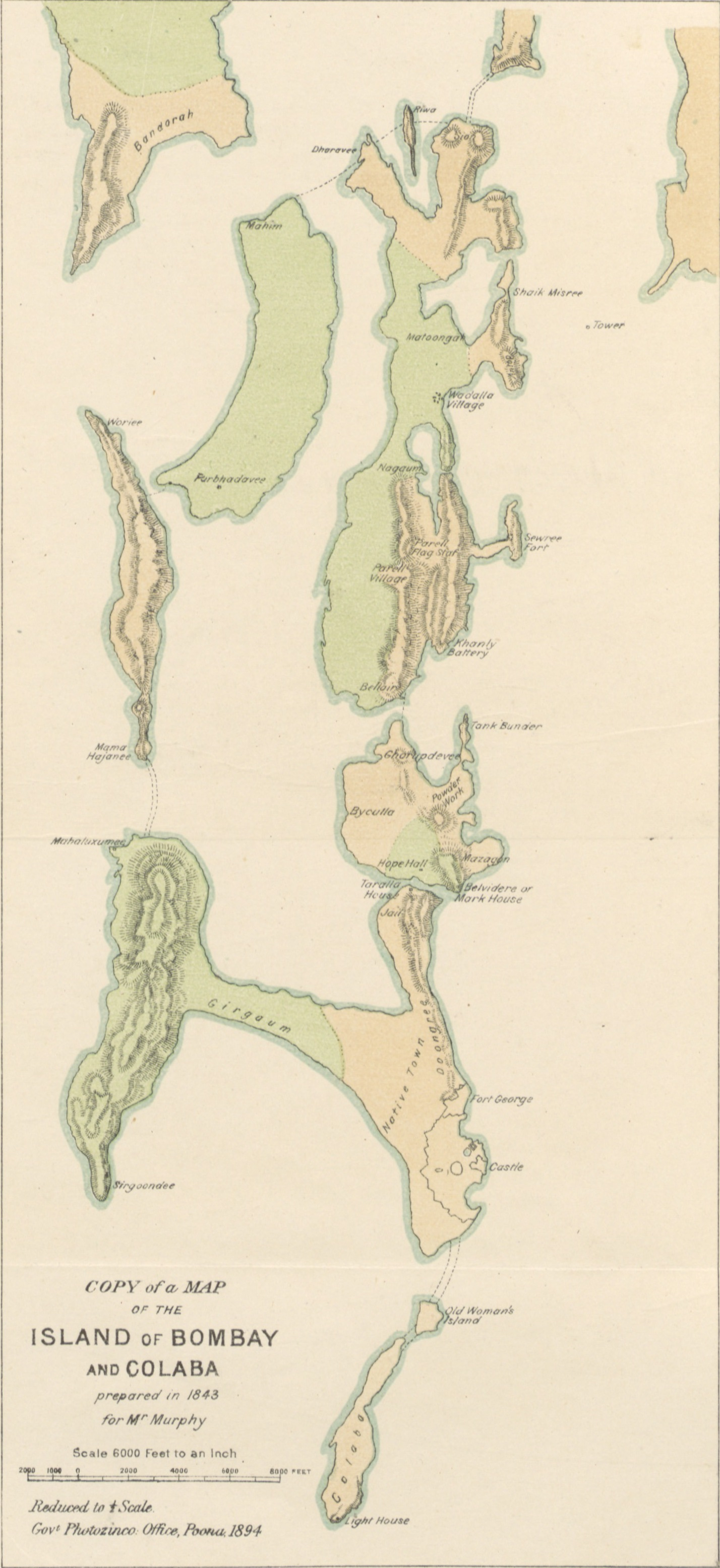
Island of Bombay and Colaba

The Seven Islands of Bombay (Portuguese: Ilhas de Bom Baim) were 16th-century Portuguese colonial possessions lying off the Konkan region by the mid-west coast of India. Following extensive land reclamation, the islands were merged with the Indian mainland and currently form the city of Mumbai.

== History ==
The islands were partly handed over to England under this title as part of the dowry of Catherine Braganza when she married Charles II in 1661. The isles and islets had earlier been part of indigenous polities like the Silhara dynasty and the Gujarat Sultanate before they were captured by the Portuguese Armadas in 1534. After acquiring them as a royal dowry from the Kingdom of Portugal, Charles II leased Bombay and adjacent islets to the East India Company in 1668 for £10 per year, receiving a loan of £50,000 at 6% interest in return for the favour.

By 1845, the islands had been merged into one landmass by means of multiple land reclamation projects. The resulting island of Bombay was later merged with the nearby islands of Trombay and Salsette, which lay to its northeast and north, respectively, to form Greater Bombay. These islands now constitute the southern part of the city of Bombay (Mumbai).

The original seven islands handed over to England were as follows:

- Colaba
- Old Woman's Island (Little Colaba)
- Isle of Bombay
- Mazagaon
- Parel
- Worli
- Mahim
Evolution of the seven islands of Bombay
The original seven islands

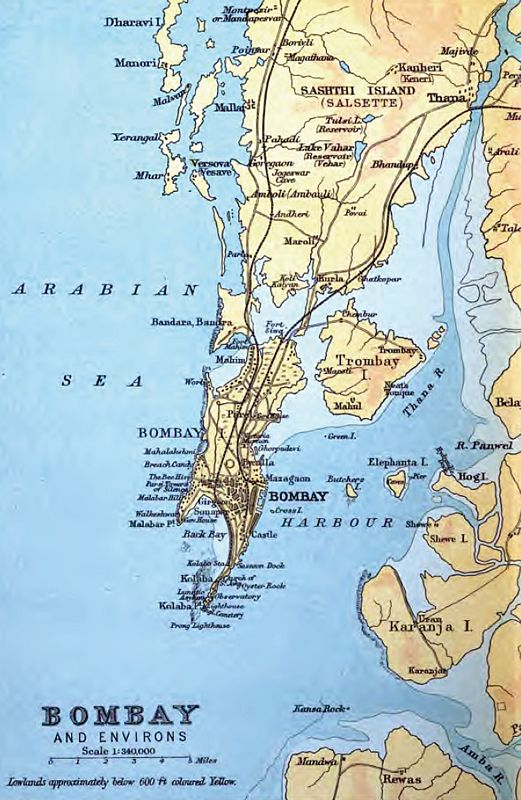
Map of Bombay in 1893.

There also are several smaller islands that lie to the east of the main seven islands:

- Butcher Island
- Cross Island
- East Ground
- Elephanta Island, also known as Gharapuri
- Middle Ground
- Oyster Rock

== See also ==
- Geography of Mumbai
- History of Bombay under British rule
- History of Bombay under Portuguese rule (1534–1661)
