= Cross Island, Mumbai =

Island in India

Coordinates: 18°56′53″N 72°51′06″E

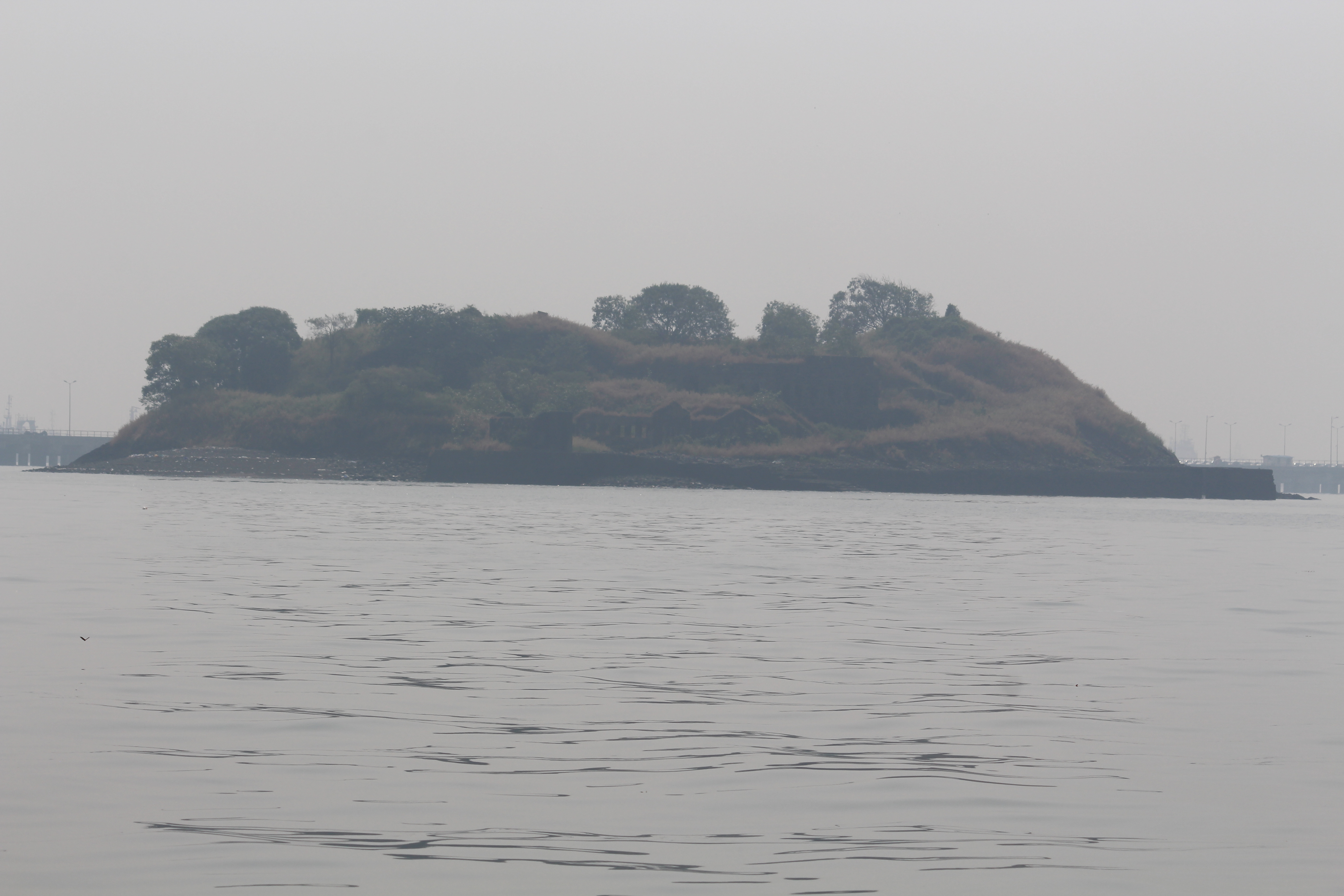
Cross Island, Mumbai

Cross Island, locally known as Chinal Tekdi, meaning hill of prostitutes, is an uninhabited or sparsely inhabited island located in Mumbai harbour, India, between the coast at Dockyard Road, and Elephanta Island, about 400 m from Ferry Wharf on the east coast of Mumbai. The island is host to an oil refinery and several large gas holders, and features the ruins of a fort.

== In the news ==
A bomb, dating back to World War II, packed with 45 kilograms of explosives, was found at the Mumbai harbour off Cross Island by labourers of Jaisu Shipping Company, during dredging operations in 2010. A year later, workers also discovered two gold bars (100gm and 50gm) stuck in steel plates of the dredger's hopper.

== In literature ==
Godfrey Joseph Pereria's Four And Twenty Black Birds:The Insane Life Of An English Smuggler In Bombay was published by Speaking Tiger in December 2021. In this book, a story unfolds on this island.
