= Butcher Island =

Neighbourhood in Mumbai, Maharashtra, India

- Neighbourhood
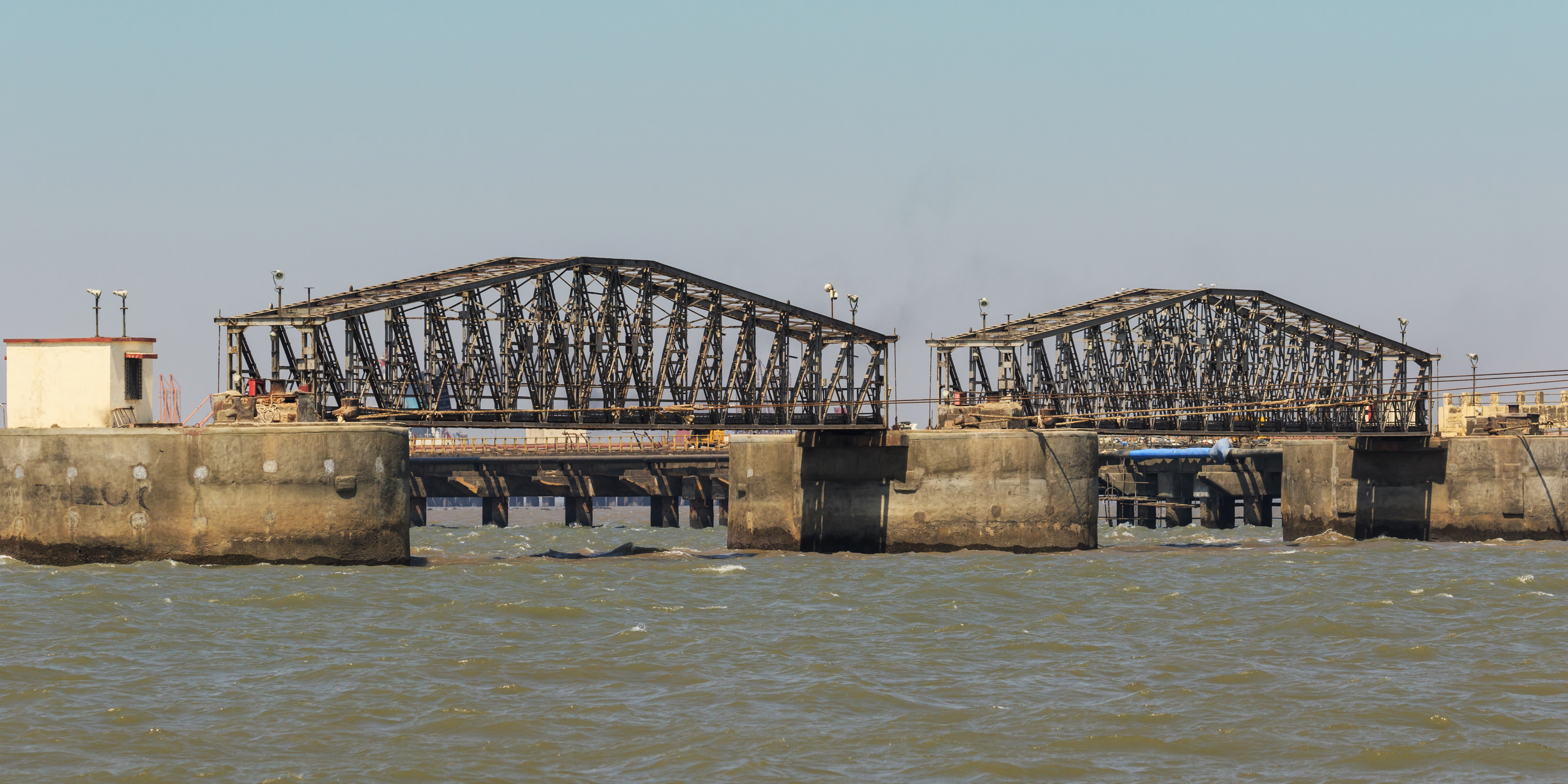
- Tanker docks at the Butcher Island

- Location within Mumbai
- Coordinates: 18.96°N 72.90°E
- Country: India
- State: Maharashtra
- Metro: Bombay

Languages
  - Official: Marathi
- Time zone: UTC+5:30 (IST)

Butcher Island (Jawahar Dweep) is an island off the coast of Mumbai, India. It has an oil terminal used by the port authorities to offload it from oil tankers. The crude oil is stored in oil containers on the island. From there they are piped to Wadala, in Mumbai where they are refined. This keeps the city relatively safe from a mishap. Tenders have been invited to develop a second oil terminal. The dredging works are currently being undertaken to improve the navigable depths in and around the new terminal.

It is a restricted area and most of the island is covered with dense vegetation. A hillock rises from the centre of the island. It is located 8.25 kilometres (5.13 mi) from the Gateway of India. The main advantage of the island is to protect Mumbai and surrounding populated areas of the city from the direct effects of accidents like explosions, fire and pollution usually associated with the handling of crude and other petroleum products.
