= Powai Lake =

Lake in Mumbai, India

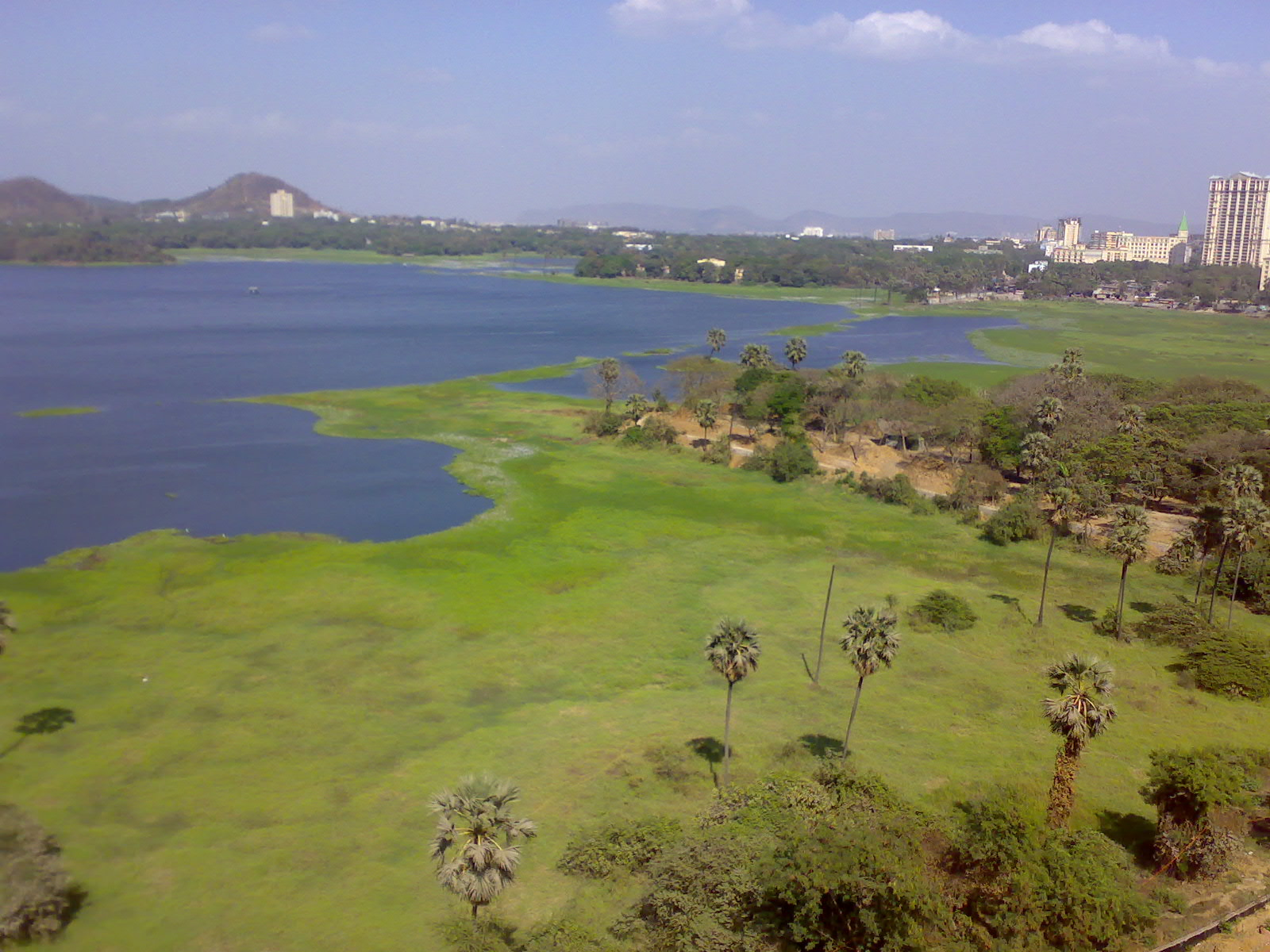

- Location within Mumbai
- Location: Mumbai, Maharashtra
- Coordinates: 19.13°N 72.91°E
- Catchment area: 6.61 km^{2} (2.55 sq mi)
- Basin countries: India
- Max. depth: 12 m (39 ft)
- Surface elevation: 58.5 m (191.93 ft)
- Settlements: Powai

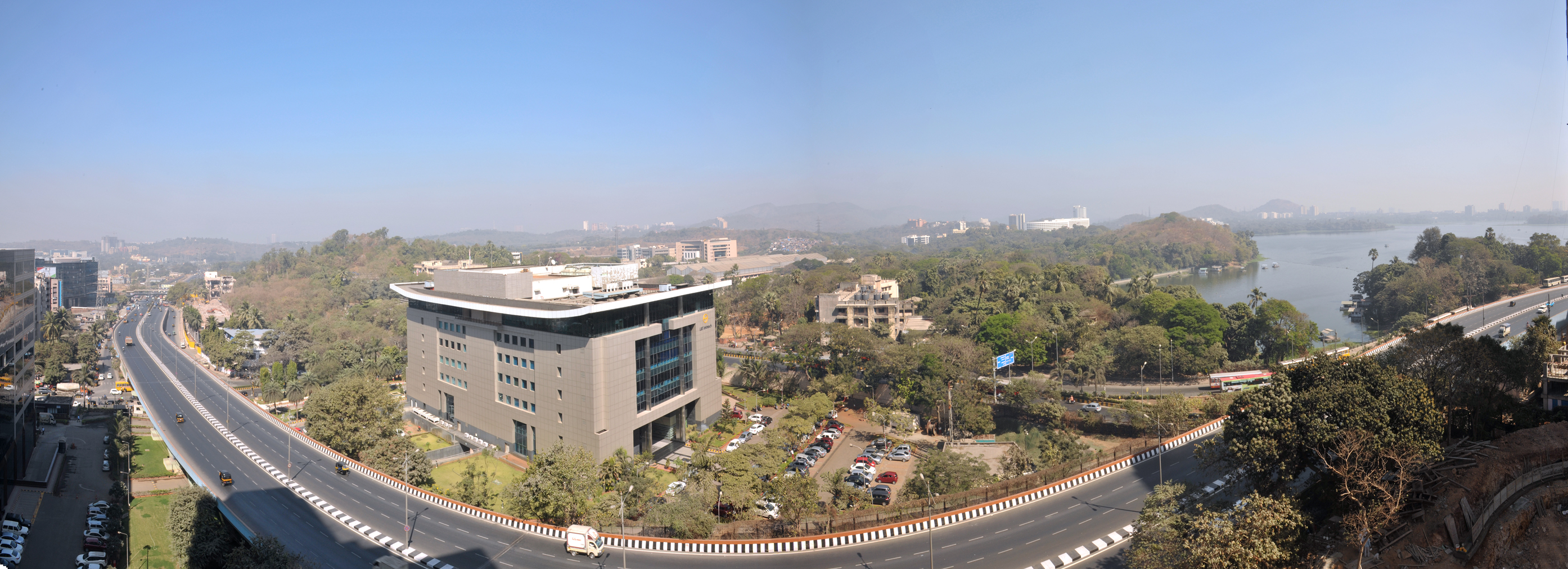
The JVLR & Powai Lake as seen from the top of Emerald Isle, Powai

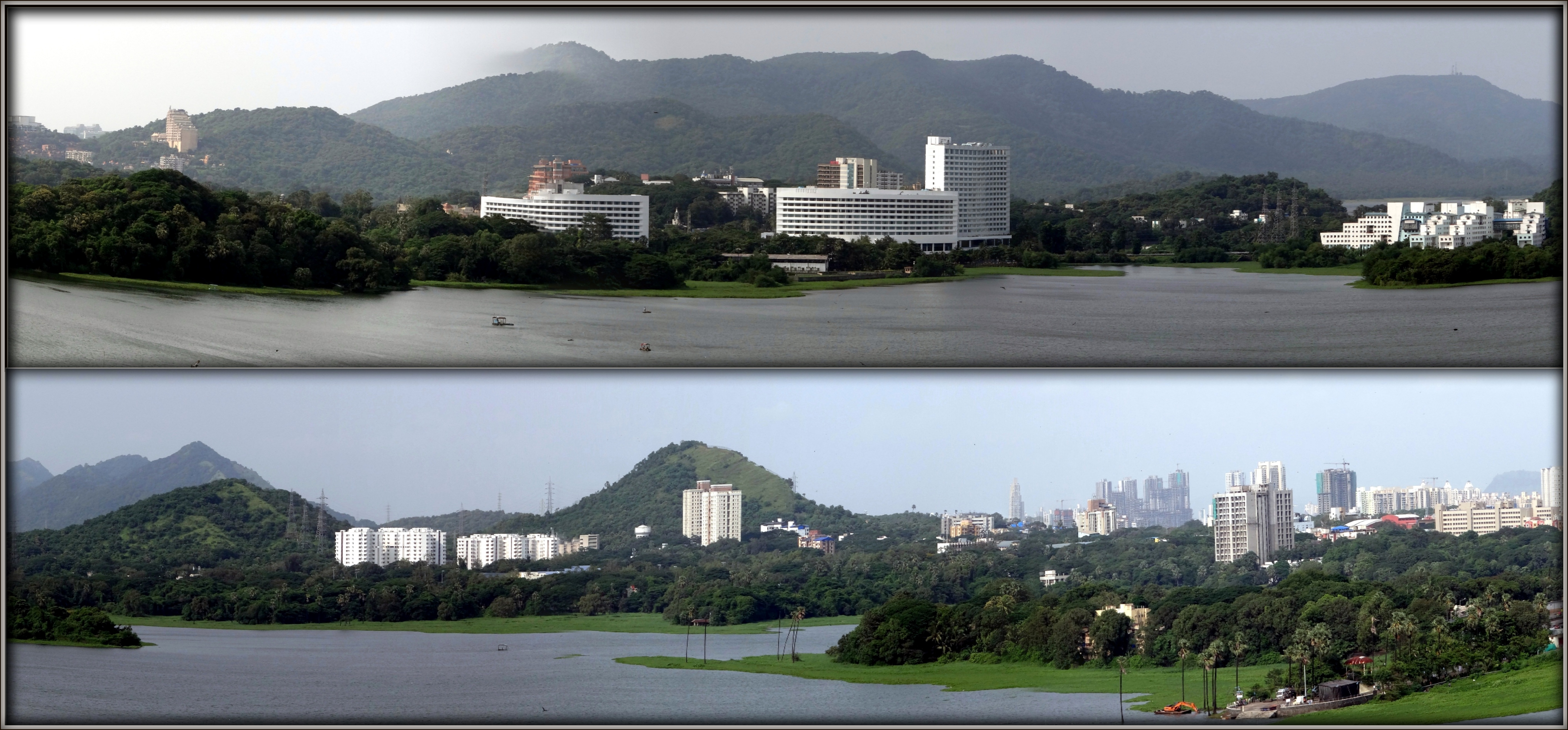
Powai Lake

Powai Lake (Pronunciation: [pəʋəiː]) is an artificial lake, situated in Mumbai, India, in the Powai valley, where a Powai village with a cluster of huts existed. The city suburb called Powai shares its name with the lake. Indian Institute of Technology Bombay, one of the premier institutions of science and technology in India, is located to the east of the lake. Another famous institution, the IIM Mumbai erstwhile known as National Institute of Industrial Engineering (NITIE), is also located close to the lake. Housing complexes and plush hotels are developed all around the lake periphery. Population around the lake has thus substantially increased over the years.

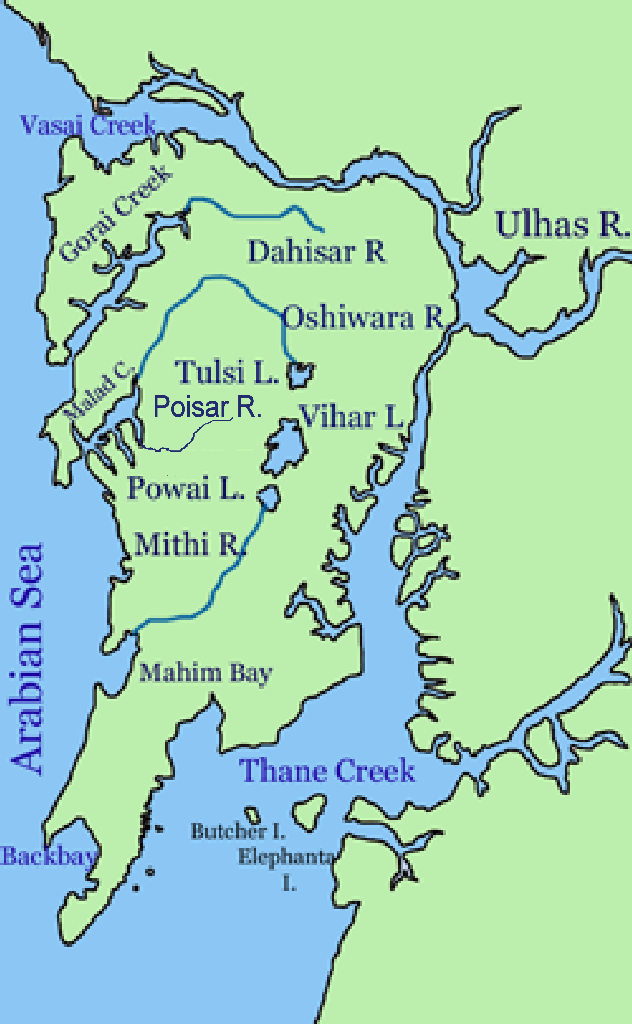
Powai Lake is located downstream of the Vihar Lake on the Mithi River

When it was built, the lake had an area of about 2.1 square kilometres (520 acres) and the depth varied from about 3 metres (9.8 ft) (at the periphery) to 12 metres (39 ft) at its deepest.

The Powai Lake has gone through many stages of water quality degradation. The lake water which used to supply drinking water for Mumbai has been declared unfit to drink. The lake remains a tourist attraction.

== History ==
Before the lake was built by the British, in 1799 AD, the estate where the lake is now was leased on a yearly rent to Dr. Scott. After his death in 1816, the government took control of the estate in 1826 and leased it to Framaji Kavasji, then the vice-president of the Agricultural and Horticultural Society of Western India after whom the lake was named when it was built in 1891.

=== Construction and early history of Powai Lake ===
A stream tributary of the Mithi River, which served the Powai village's water needs, was dammed in 1891, during the British period. It was initially to augment water supply to Bombay city (now called Mumbai), by constructing two dams of 10 m to store the rain water flowing from the lower slopes of the Western Ghats and streams from the eastern and northeastern slopes of hills. It was planned as an antiwater famine measure, to the southeast of Vihar Lake (a much larger lake) also for water supply to Mumbai city. The scheme was taken in hand in 1889. Though it was completed within a year at an initial cost of more than Rs. 6,50,000 and started providing two million gallons of water per day, it had to be abandoned due to the hue and cry against the quality of the water. Five lakhs of rupees more were spent on the scheme in 1919 in an attempt to restore the supply at least for the suburbs but this, too, was given up with the development of the Tansa works.

=== Shift from water supply to angling and conservation efforts ===
After the drinking water supply objective was abandoned in the early 1890s, in view of poor quality of the water due to pollution, water hyacinth and weeds, untreated sewage and large silt deposit, the lake was leased to the Western India Fishing Association, a quasi government organisation, who used it for fish culture and angling. Later, the Bombay Presidency Angling Association was formed in 1936. In 1955, under the Societies Registration Act 1860, it was registered as the Maharashtra State Angling Association (MSAA) and the lake is now under their control. Realising the gravity of the environmental pollution, the MSAA has revised its constitution "to actively care for, clean, develop, maintain, and beautify the Environment at Powai Lake."

MSAA is now involved with

- removal of water hyacinth infestation
- supporting research with Fisheries Department for conservation of the Indian mahaseer
- water quality analysis
- augmenting security.

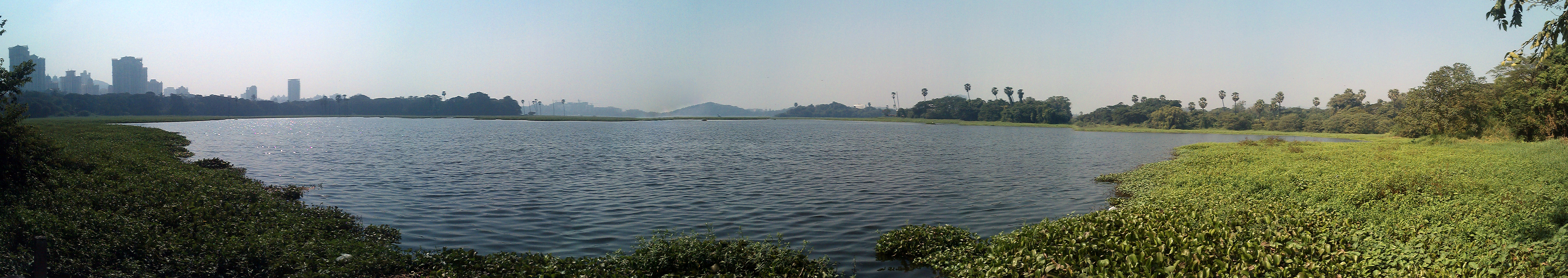
Panorama of Powai Lake, seen from the campus of IIT Bombay, in December 2012

== Location and accessibility ==
The lake is about 40 kilometres (25 mi) from Mumbai's downtown by road and is approached via Kurla or through Santa Cruz and Andheri. Kanjurmarg on the Central Line (Mumbai Suburban Railway) of the Mumbai Suburban Railway is the nearest railway station to the lake. The airport is also nearby.

== Hydrology, catchment, and current water quality ==
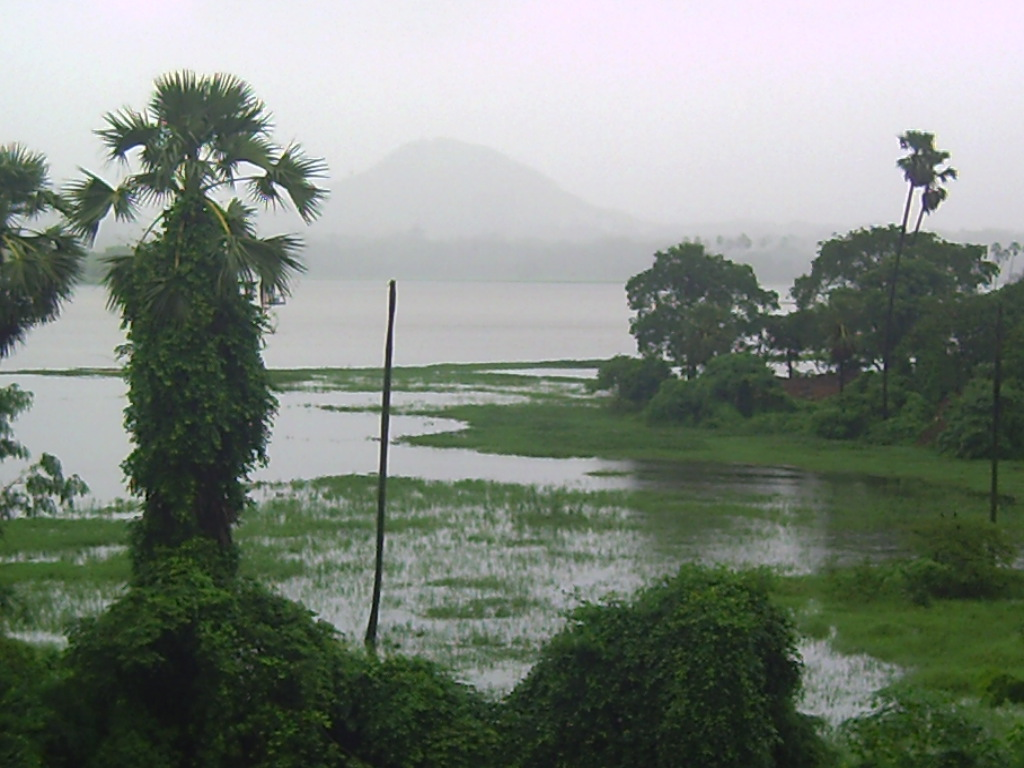
Powai Lake Mumbai overflowing after rains of 26 and 27 July 2005

It is reported that the average rainfall at Powai is about 2,540 millimetres (100 in), and the lake overflows for about sixty days each year. The overflow from the lake flows into the Mithi River. Silt studies conducted in 1995 estimates in that 4500 lakh cubic metres of silt has been deposited in the lake since its construction. It supplied two million gallons of water to Bombay (now Mumbai) when it was built. Following the construction of the Tansa dam and creation of the reservoir, in 1892, Powai waters were used for irrigation. The lake drains a catchment of 6.61 km^{2} (part of the Powai-Kanheri hill ranges which also drain into the adjoining Vihar Lake and Tulsi Lake). The dam, built in stone masonry has a height varying from 3 m to 6m with top level of the dam kept at E.L. 58.5 m (with Town hall datum). Government of Maharashtra reports that due to eutrophication of the lake water from untreated sewage and garbage from nearby residential and slum colonies, the lake water is unfit for drinking water use. Hence, the lake is now used for recreation, gardening, cattle washing and fishing. The water of the lake is also supplied to Aarey colony and Larsen & Toubro for non domestic uses. Dissolved Oxygen (DO) level at the bottom of the lake is reported to be 0.71 mg/litre and at surface 4.11 mg/litre, average value of pH is 7.2 and COD is 42.70 mg/litre on the surface and 119 mg/litre at the bottom of the lake.

== Revitalization efforts by IIT Bombay alumni ==
Appreciating the problem of silting, growth of water hyacinth, weed, and eutrophication of the lake, the IIT Bombay's Class of 1980 launched a "Revitalization of Powai Lake" with the objective of restoring the lake to its original pristine and sustainable form by adopting Eco-friendly designs and materials for the restoration works.

== Decline in water depth and desilting plans ==
The Lake's water depth is reported to have reduced to as little as 0.33 metres (1.1 ft) at some locations, on account of the large inflow of sewage, domestic waste water and silt from surrounding residential and industrial areas.

Brihanmumbai Municipal Corporation (BMC) has therefore plans to desilt the Powai Lake at a cost of US$9 million.

== Fauna ==
The lake is home to at least 18 Indian marsh crocodiles, as per a 2022 BMC census.

== Gallery ==
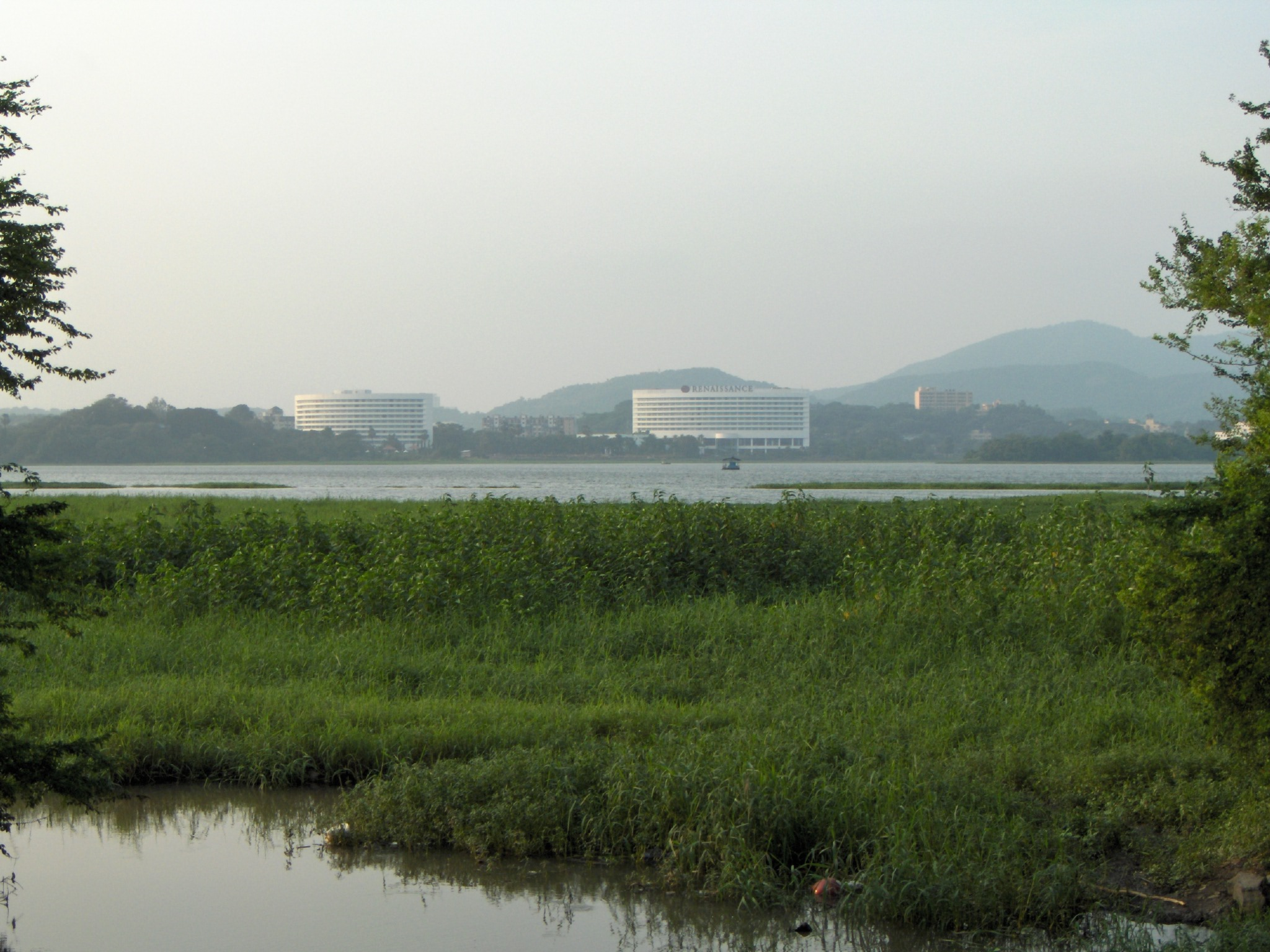
Powai Lake

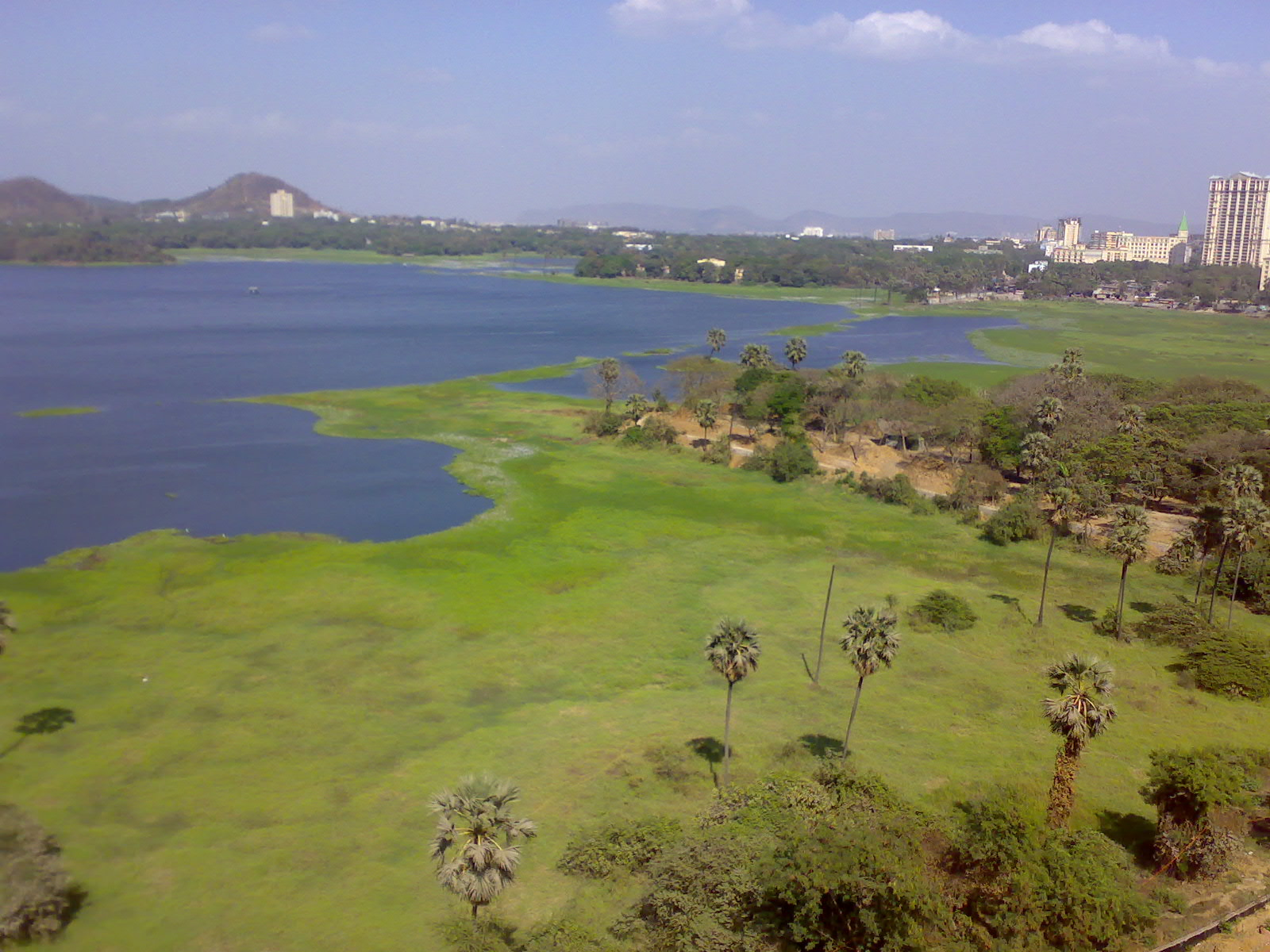

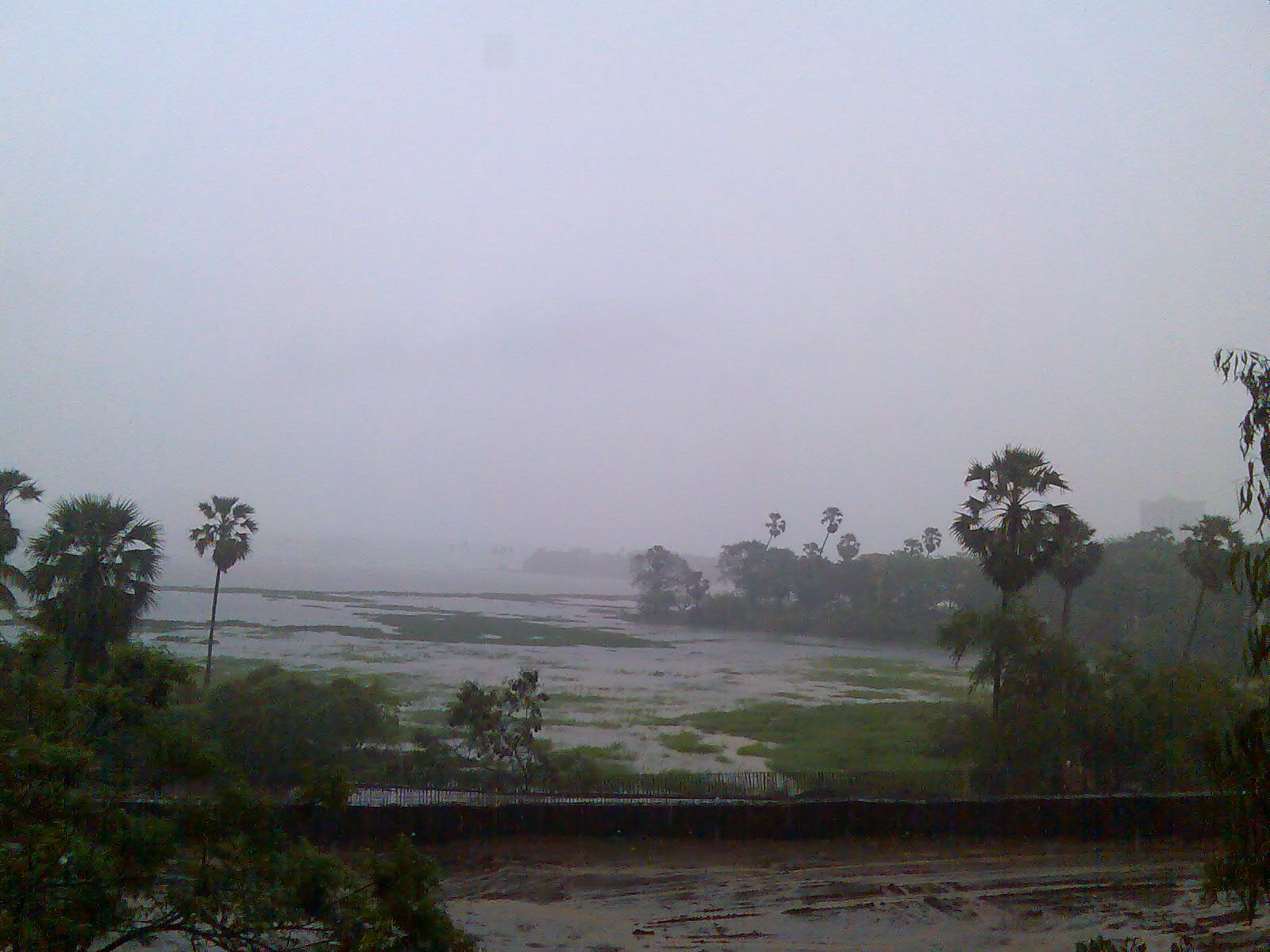
Powai Lake - Before Heavy Showers of Rain

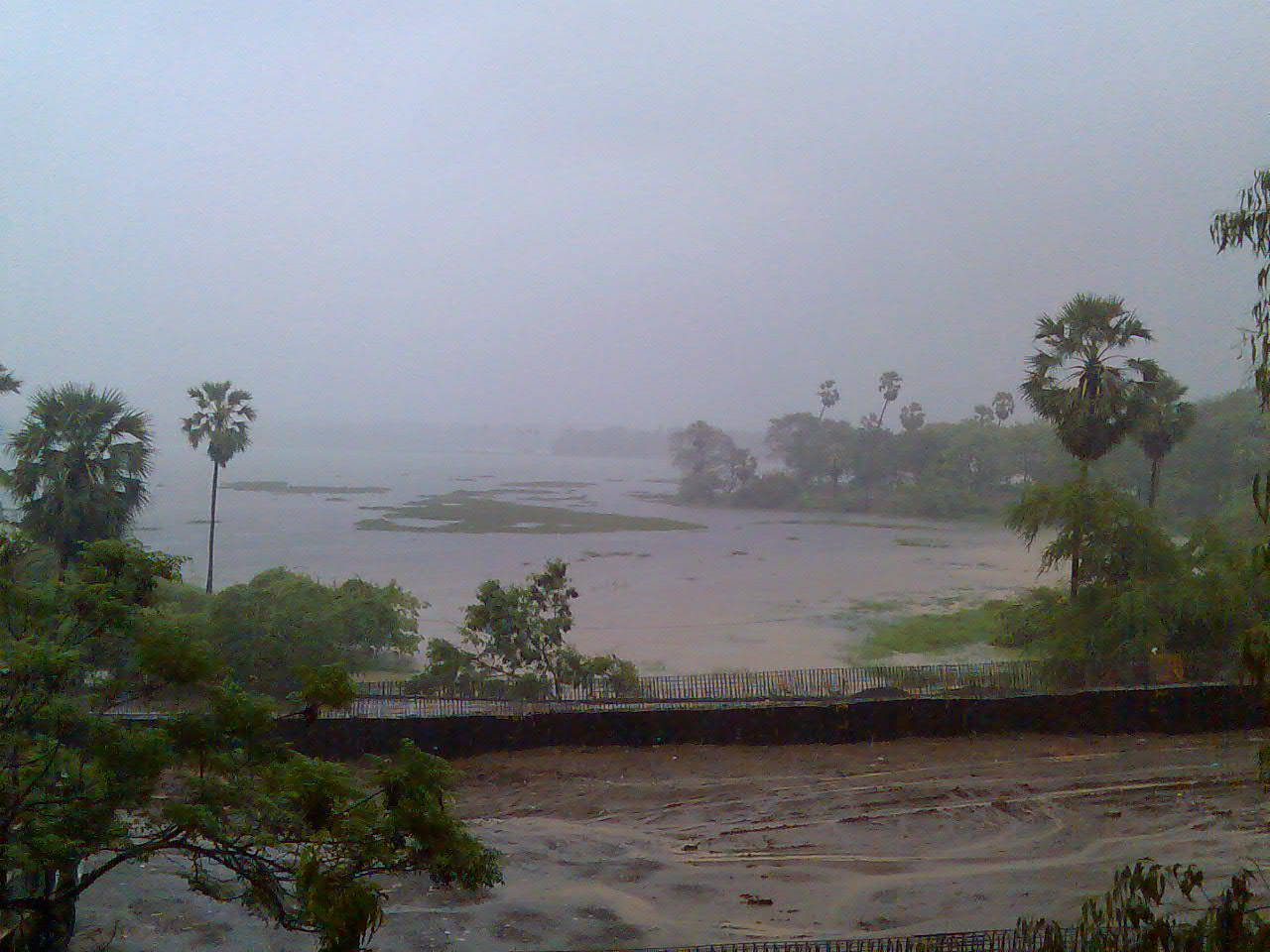
Powai Lake - After Heavy Showers of Rain
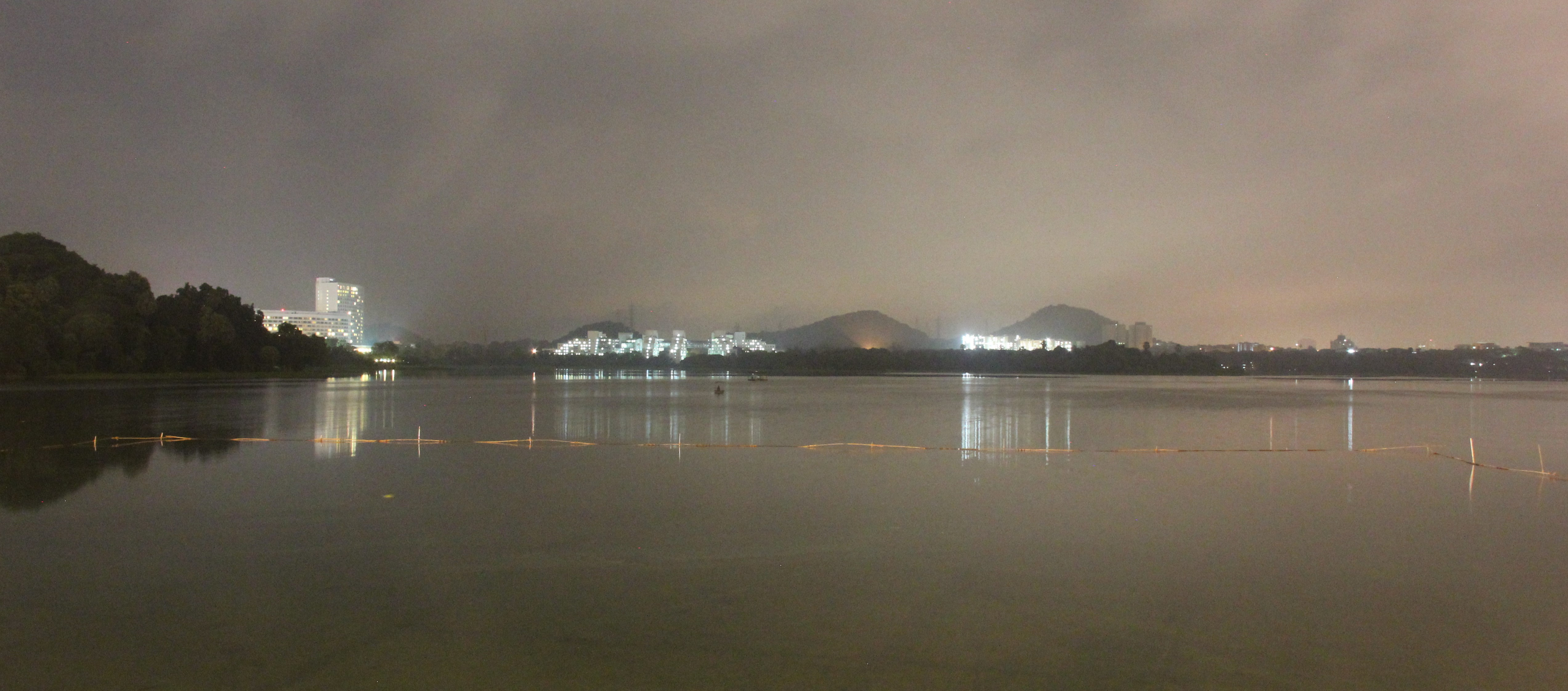
Powai lake in night. Picture take from JVLR side
