= Vihar Lake =

Lake in Mumbai

- विहार तलाव (Marathi)
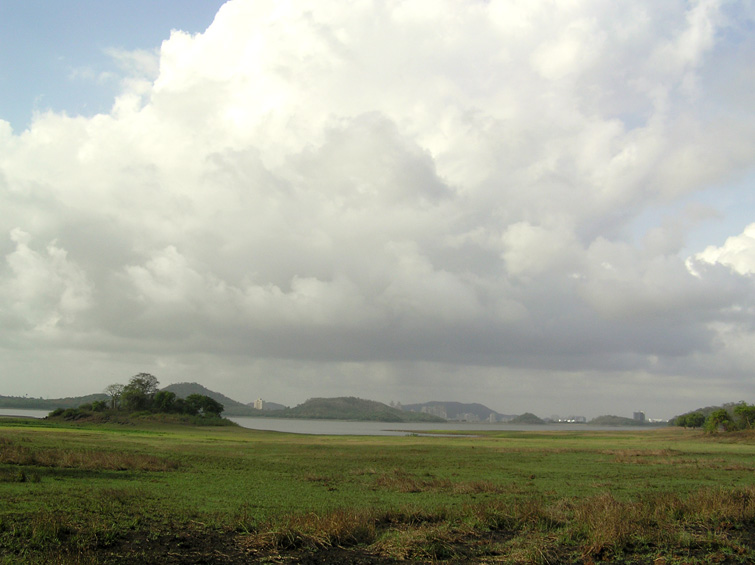
- Clouds above Vihar Lake.

- Location within Mumbai
- Location: Sanjay Gandhi National Park, Mumbai
- Coordinates: 19.1440°N 72.910°E
- Type: reservoir, fresh water
- Primary inflows: Mithi River
- Primary outflows: Mithi River
- Catchment area: 18.96 km^{2} (7.32 sq mi)
- Basin countries: India
- Managing agency: Brihanmumbai Municipal Corporation
- Built: 1860 (Construction started in January 1856)
- Surface area: 7 km^{2} (2.7 sq mi)
- Max. depth: 34 m (112 ft)
- Water volume: 9,200,000,000 imp gal (0.042 km^{3})
- Surface elevation: 80.42 m (263.8 ft)
- Islands: Salsette
- Settlements: Mumbai

Vihar Lake (Pronunciation: [ʋiɦaːɾ]) is located near Vihar village on the Mithi River, within the precincts of the Sanjay Gandhi National Park, in North Mumbai. When built in 1860 (construction started in 1856), it was considered the largest lake in Mumbai in the Salsette group of islands. It is hemmed between Tulsi Lake and the Powai Lake (shown in the map). It partly meets the drinking water needs of the Mumbai region. It supplies only 3% of Mumbai city's water requirement, after filtration at Bhandup, where the large water filtration plant is located.

== History ==
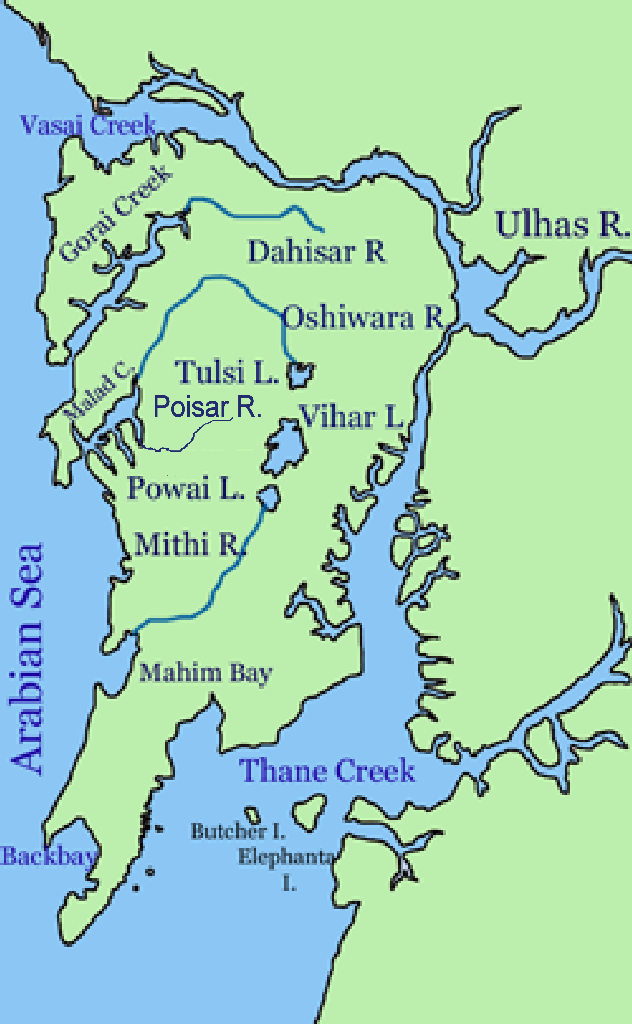
Vihar Lake hemmed between Powai Lake and Tulsi Lake

=== Water shortage crisis and early British intervention (1845) ===
With the few thousand wells feeding the population of Mumbai tending to go dry during summer, the acute shortage of water resulted in protests by the local residents in June 1845. A two-man committee, appointed by the British rulers of the time, to examine the grievances of the agitators concurred with water shortage problem and stressed the urgent need to solve the water supply problem of Mumbai.

=== Development of reservoirs and early water infrastructure ===
The Committee appointed by the government located suitable sites to construct dams and create reservoirs to store the monsoon flows of the Mithi river catchment, which resulted in presently existing Vihar Lake, Tulsi Lake, and the Powai Lake. Vihar reservoir was the first piped water supply scheme of Mumbai.

In 1850, Captain Crawford submitted a report favouring the Vihar Scheme for the Mumbai city's water supply needs.

Work on the "Vihar Water Works" commenced in January 1856 and was completed in 1860, during the governorship of John Lord Elphinstone.

The Brihanmumbai Municipal Corporation (BMC), a Govt. body which controls the lake's affairs has also acquired agricultural land in the catchment area of the Vihar lake as a sanitary precaution.

== Location, accessibility, and public restrictions ==
By road, it is 31 km (19 mi) from Mumbai. Access by suburban electric train is to Kurla or Andheri and then by road.

Access to the lake for the general public has been curtailed since 13 March 1993 (Source: Official BMC Board installed at the gate) following the Bombay Blasts on 12 March 1993 due to perceived threats to the Mumbai public, as the lake is located in the Sanjay Gandhi National Park. It can still be viewed in many Bollywood movies in a long shot taken from Mumbai Film City, as seen in the Infobox.

== Hydrology and dam features ==
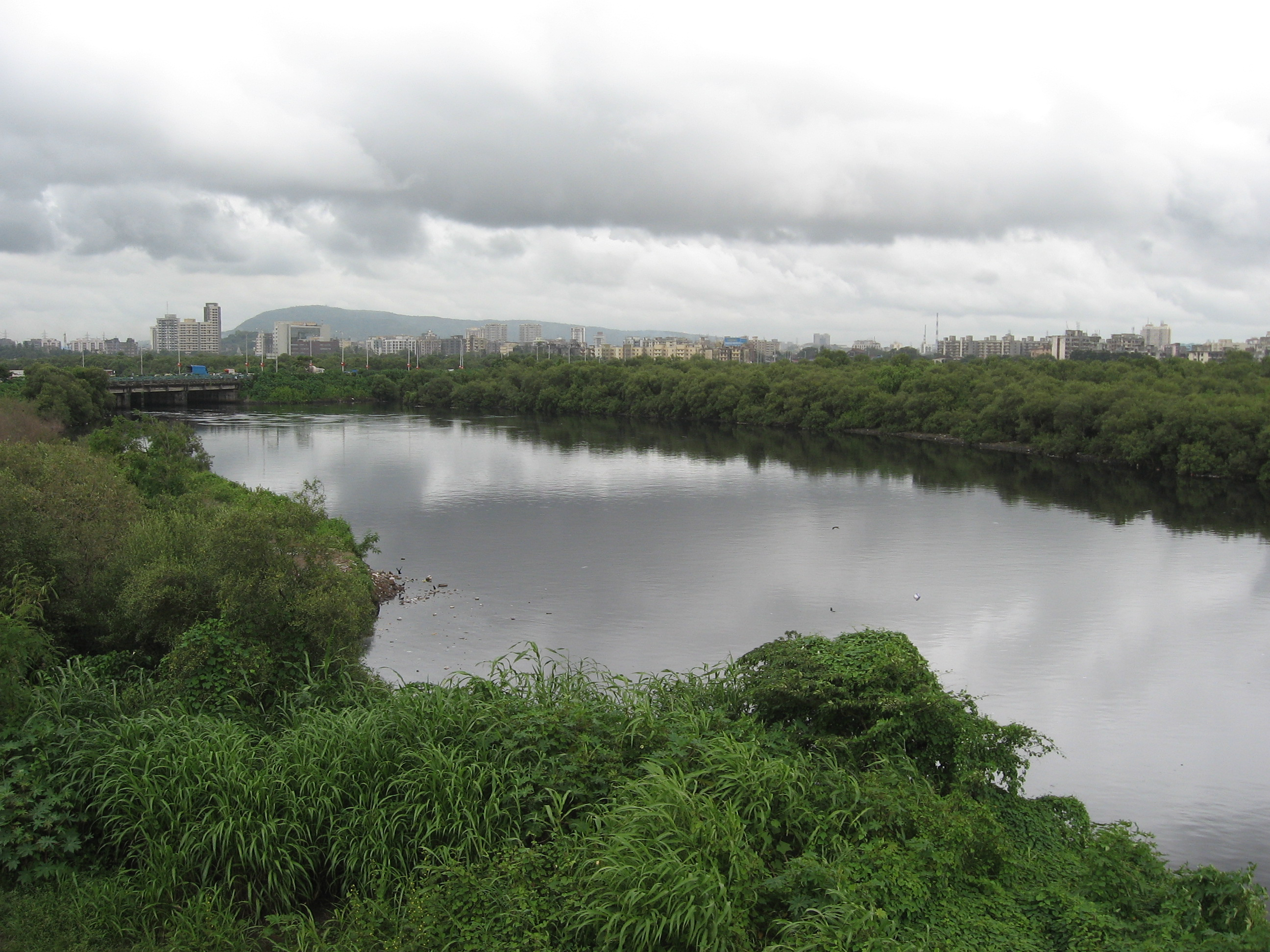
Mithi River on which the Vihar Lake was created in 1860 A.D

Impoundment of Mithi River, 20 km (12 mi) north of Mumbai, was effected to store the rainwater from a catchment area of 18.96 km^{2} to create the Vihar Lake. The Powai-Kanheri hill ranges form the catchment area, which drains the rain water into the lake. For this purpose, three earthen embankment dams with a masonry spillway section were constructed to create a reservoir of 9200 million gallons capacity at the full reservoir level of 80.42 metres. The lake has a maximum water depth of 34 m and a minimum of 12 m. The lakes water spread area is 7 km^{2}. The dam height was raised in 1872 resulting in increase of water supply from 32 million gallons (catering to a population of 0.7 million) to 36 million gallons.

== Flora and fauna ==
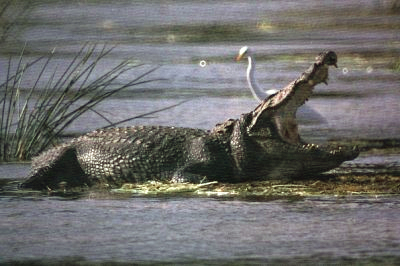
Mugger or Marsh Crocodile

The lake and its catchment are protected by the Brihanmumbai Municipal Corporation and Sanjay Gandhi National Park Authority. The catchment areas of Vihar lake has high hills rising on all sides. The seclusion, protection, and security provided under the Sanjay Gandhi National Park has ensured well wooded hill slopes and abundant natural regeneration. Higher percentage of khair species has been noted in the catchment area of the lake.

As the lake is situated inside the Sanjay Gandhi National Park, the flora and fauna reported for the park would be relevant to the lake. However, fresh water crocodiles Mugger or Marsh crocodiles (Crocodilus palustris) are known to inhabit the lake in sustainable numbers. As it is difficult to sight them in the lake, the park has set up a Crocodile Park’ to view the reptiles of different sizes.

== Limnology ==
Limnological studies carried out by the Central Public Health Engineering Research Institute, Nagpur, India, in 1964, indicated an unstable thermal stratification in the lake waters. The dissolved oxygen (DO) values were found to increase in some months and carbon dioxide was found to be less at the surface than at the bottom. In cooler season, the surface water was found to be less alkaline, which could be attributed to the photosynthesis activity of the algae. The pH stratification was found to be unstable. Interrelation was attributed to fluctuations in the chlorophyll, pH and DO values and nitrates were generally absent on the surface and no sulphates were detected.

== Sweet Water Phenomenon at Mahim Creek (2006) ==
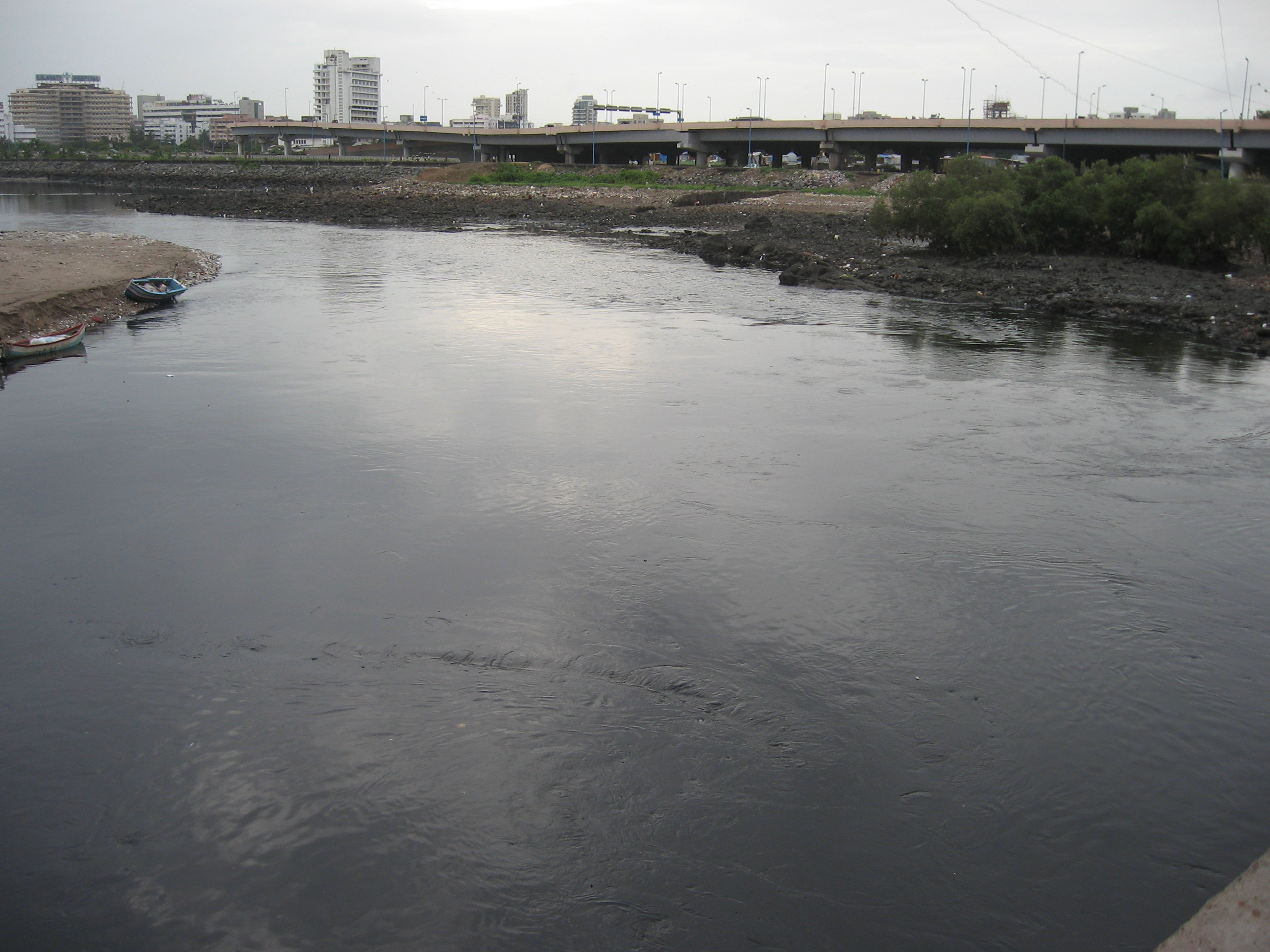
Mahim Creek where Mithi River joins and where the sweet water episode occurred in 2006

In the year 2006, finding sweet water at the Mahim Creek (a semi enclosed area), where fresh water and sea water meet, created a lot of excitement among the public. The health department of BMC who analysed the water sample from the site found that salt level in the sea water was as low as 600 particle per million (ppm), compared to the normal level 10000000 particle per million (ppm). The National Institute of Oceanography, Goa who were also consulted stated that this phenomenon was not unusual and could have been caused by heavy rainfall and low tide. This necessitated the Maharashtra Government to intervene and examine the issue rationally to convince the excited public. BMC Commissioner gave a press statement stating:

The Mahim creek is located in a semi-enclosed area where fresh water and sea water mix especially during low tide, which caused the dilution. Also, the Vihar Lake on the outskirts of Mumbai has been overflowing for the past few days and has flown into the Mithi River, which could be the reason for the water tasting sweet.
