= Holy Cross High School (Kurla) =

Government school in Mumbai

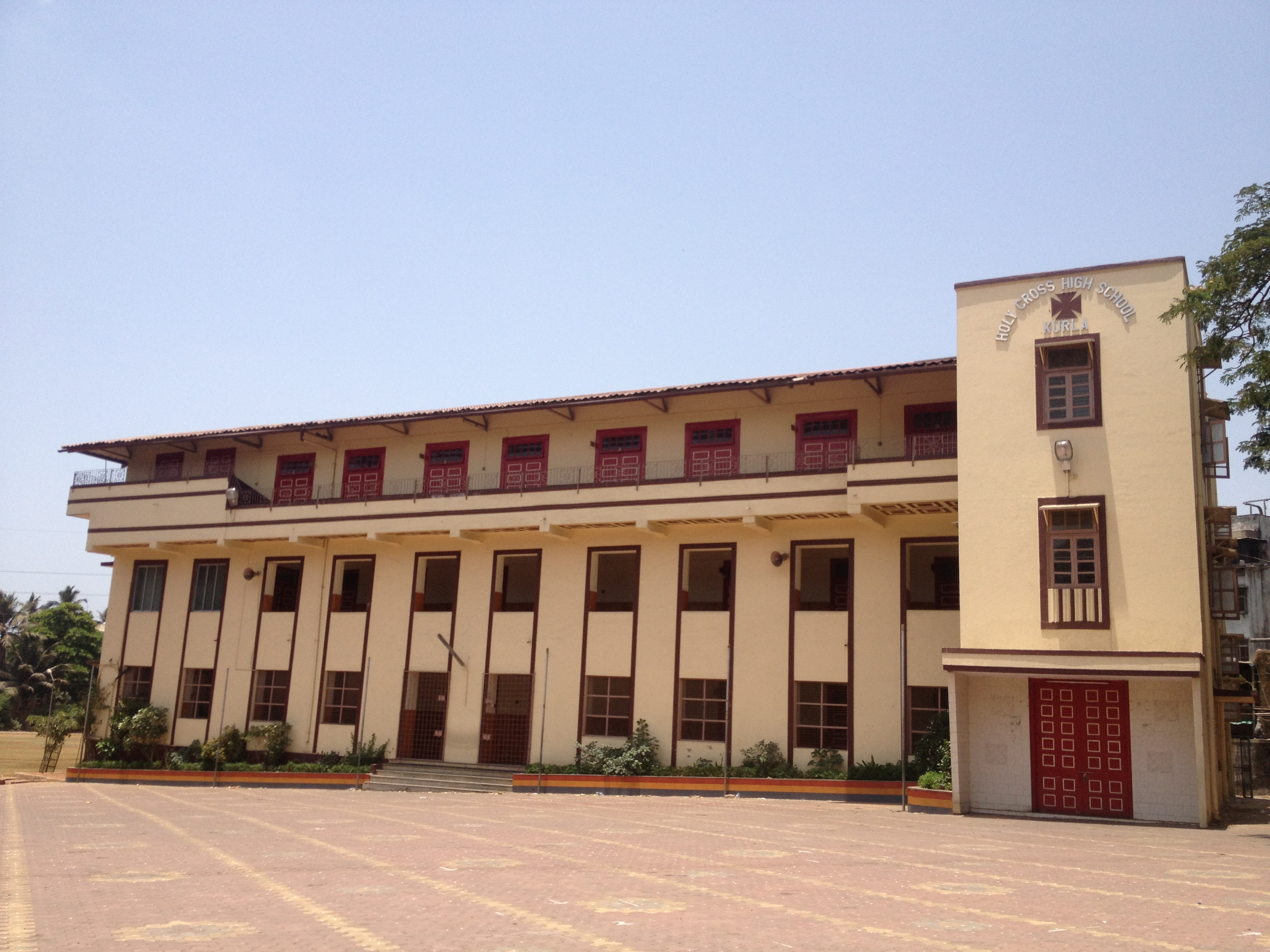
- Middle school building

Location
- Kurla; Mumbai, Maharashtra; India; 19.082950°N 72.886004°E

Information
- Type: Government school, Catholic, Co-ed
- Motto: Lead Kindly Light
- Established: 1901
- Principal: Fr Norbert D’Souza
- Manager: Fr Anselm Gonsalves
- Language: English, Marathi
- Website: http://www.holycrosskurla.com

Holy Cross High School is a school located in Kurla, a suburb of Mumbai, India. It prepares students for the Secondary School Leaving Certificate examinations conducted by the Maharashtra State Board of Secondary and Higher Secondary Education.

== About Holy Cross School and its history ==
Holy Cross High School (affiliated to Archdiocesan Board of Education) is a private, aided, minority school. It is a coeducational school. The school was established in the year 1901.

The school is run by the Catholic parish of Holy Cross Church, Kurla and teaches in English and Marathi. Its primary school (standards 1st to 4th) is privately run while the secondary section (5th to 10th standard) is government-aided.

The School has a total strength of approximate 6000 students from the KG, primary and secondary section. The number of children in the KG section is around 1000. The primary has over 2000 students and the secondary section has over 3000 students.

== Management ==
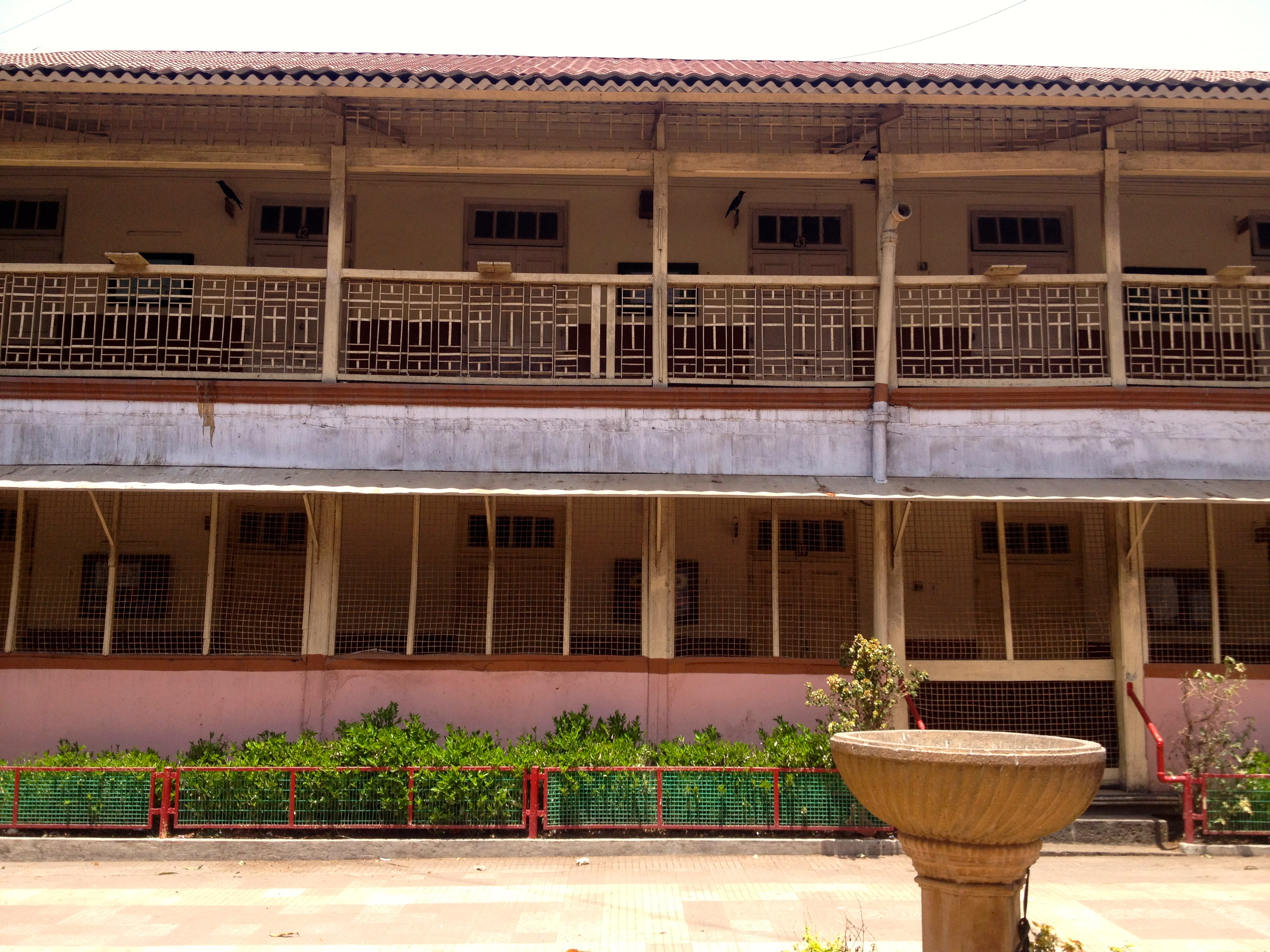
primary building

The school is run by the Catholic parish of Holy Cross Church, Kurla and teaches in English and Marathi. Its primary school (standards 1st to 4th) is privately run while the secondary section (5th to 10th standard) is government-aided.

== Location ==
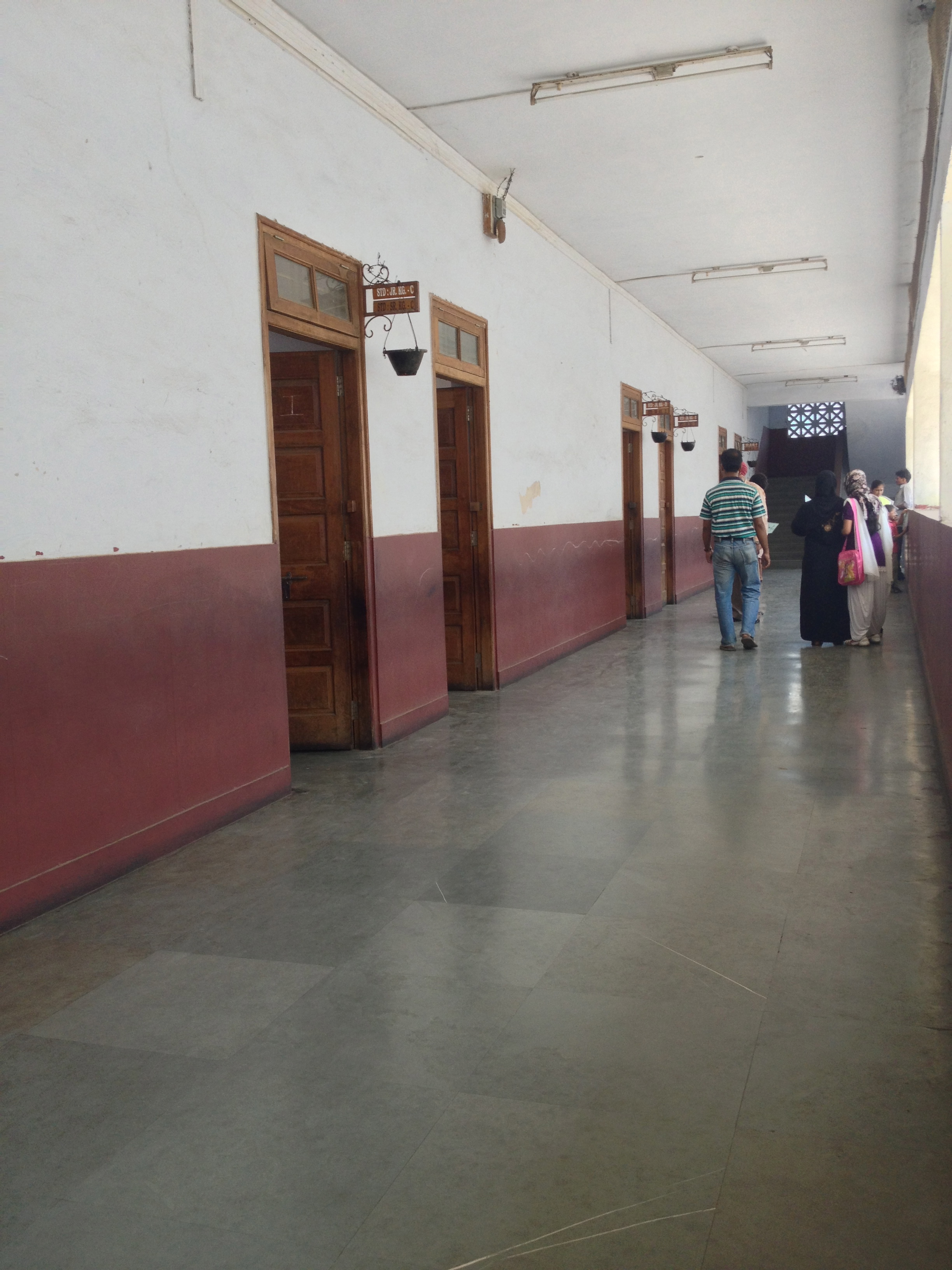
New Kindergarten

Holy Cross High School is situated on Premier Road, off Lal Bahadur Shastri Marg, opposite Kohinoor city in Kurla (West), 2.5 km from Kurla railway station and 1.6 km from Vidyavihar railway station (west). This school is very close to the popular Phoenix Market City Mumbai.
