= Michael High School, Kurla =

Private school in Mumbai, India

Michael High School
- C.E.S.'s Michael High School
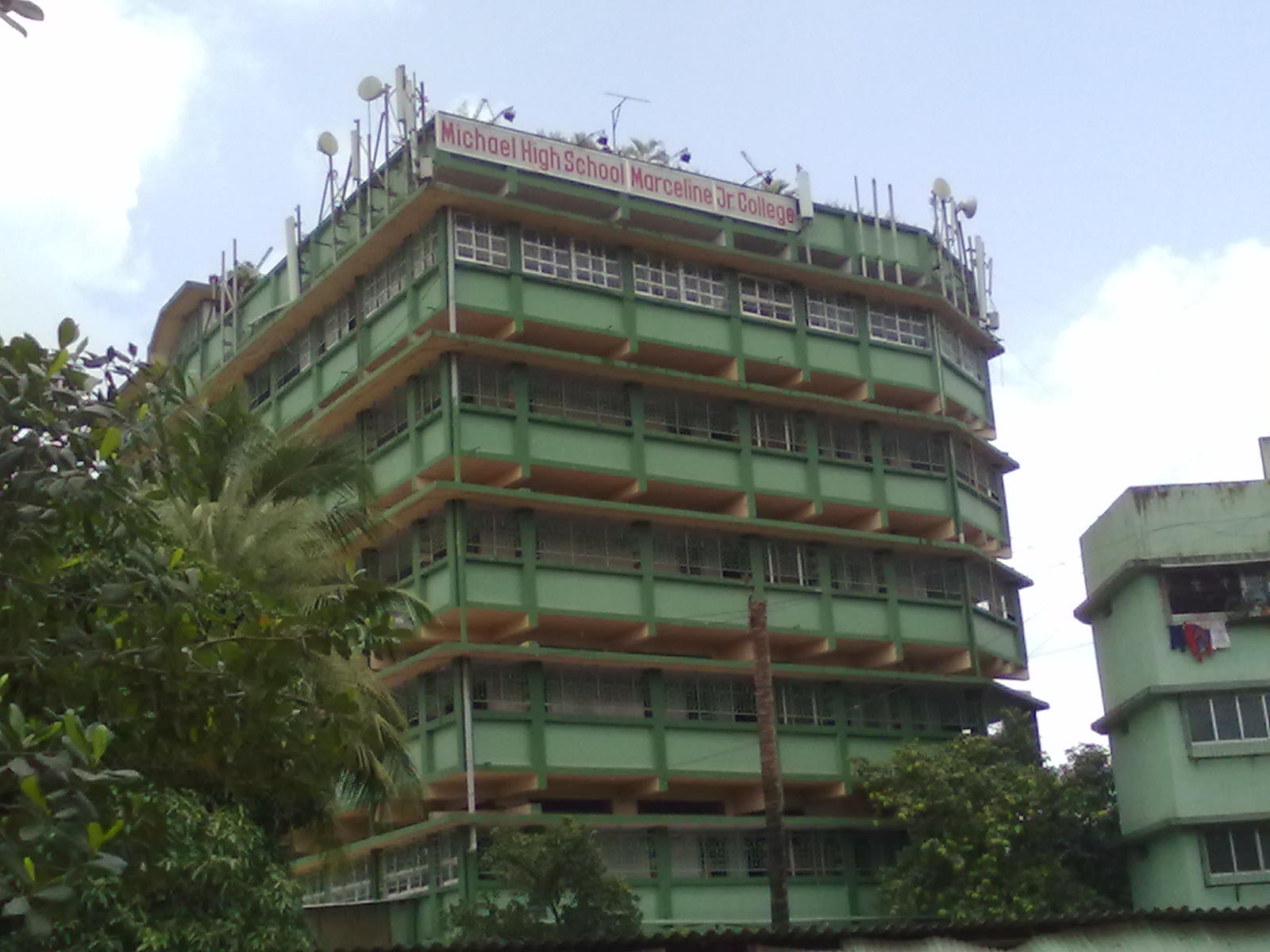

Location
- Kurla West, Mumbai, Maharashtra; India; 19.083539°N 72.883434°E

Information
- Other name: Michael High School and Junior College
- Type: Private school
- Motto: Learn to be wise
- Religious affiliation: Catholic
- Established: 1988
- Founder: Moses Gomes
- School board: Maharashtra State Board of Secondary and Higher Secondary Education
- School district: Mumbai
- Authority: Catholic Education Society
- Principal: Jean Moses Gomes
- Head teacher: Savvy M. Mendonca
- Grades: Jr Kg to Higher Secondary (HSC)
- Gender: Co-educational
- Language: English
- Affiliation: Catholic Education Society
- Website: www.michaelhighschool.com

Michael High School is located in Kurla, a suburb of Mumbai, India. It prepares students for the Secondary School Leaving Certificate examinations conducted by the Maharashtra State Board of Secondary and Higher Secondary Education. The institution has also operated a junior college, known as Marceline Junior College of Arts, Science and Commerce.

== Location ==
Michael high school is situated on Pipe line Road, off Lal Bahadur Shastri Marg, opposite state Bank of India in Kurla (West), 2.5 km from Kurla railway station and 2.0 km from Vidyavihar railway station (west). This school is very close to the popular Phoenix Market City Mumbai.

== Awards and achievements ==
On 10th Annual Awards ceremony the Principal Mrs Jean Moses Gomes was awarded with the title 'Educationist of the year by the Mobai gaothan panchayat (MGP). In 2015 the school has been awarded as 'Best school of the year' by Tata Power for club enerji programme.

Mrs. Jean Moses Gomes received the National Award for Teachers in 2012. Daijiworld reported that she received the award at Vigyan Bhawan in New Delhi from President Pranab Mukherjee and identified her as principal of C.E.S. Michael High School and Marceline Junior College.

Mrs Jean Gomes along with other Awardees with the Prime Minister of India during the 2011 Teachers Award held on September 04, 2012

== Environmental initiatives ==
Michael High School has been documented in connection with environmental education activities. The National Centre for School Leadership (NCSL), under the National Institute of Educational Planning and Administration (NIEPA), lists C.E.S.'s Michael High School, Kurla (W), Mumbai in its Maharashtra school leadership case-study repository, under the 2022–2023 collection.

A case study titled Our Mission to Curb Environment Degradation, associated with Jean Moses Gomes, describes environmental activities at the school, including an initiative referred to as the "Global Warriors" programme. The case study states that the programme began in 1980–81 and describes activities including tree planting, cleanliness drives, environmental and science programmes, competitions, workshops and field visits.
