= Haji Arfat Shaikh =

Indian politician (b. 1977)

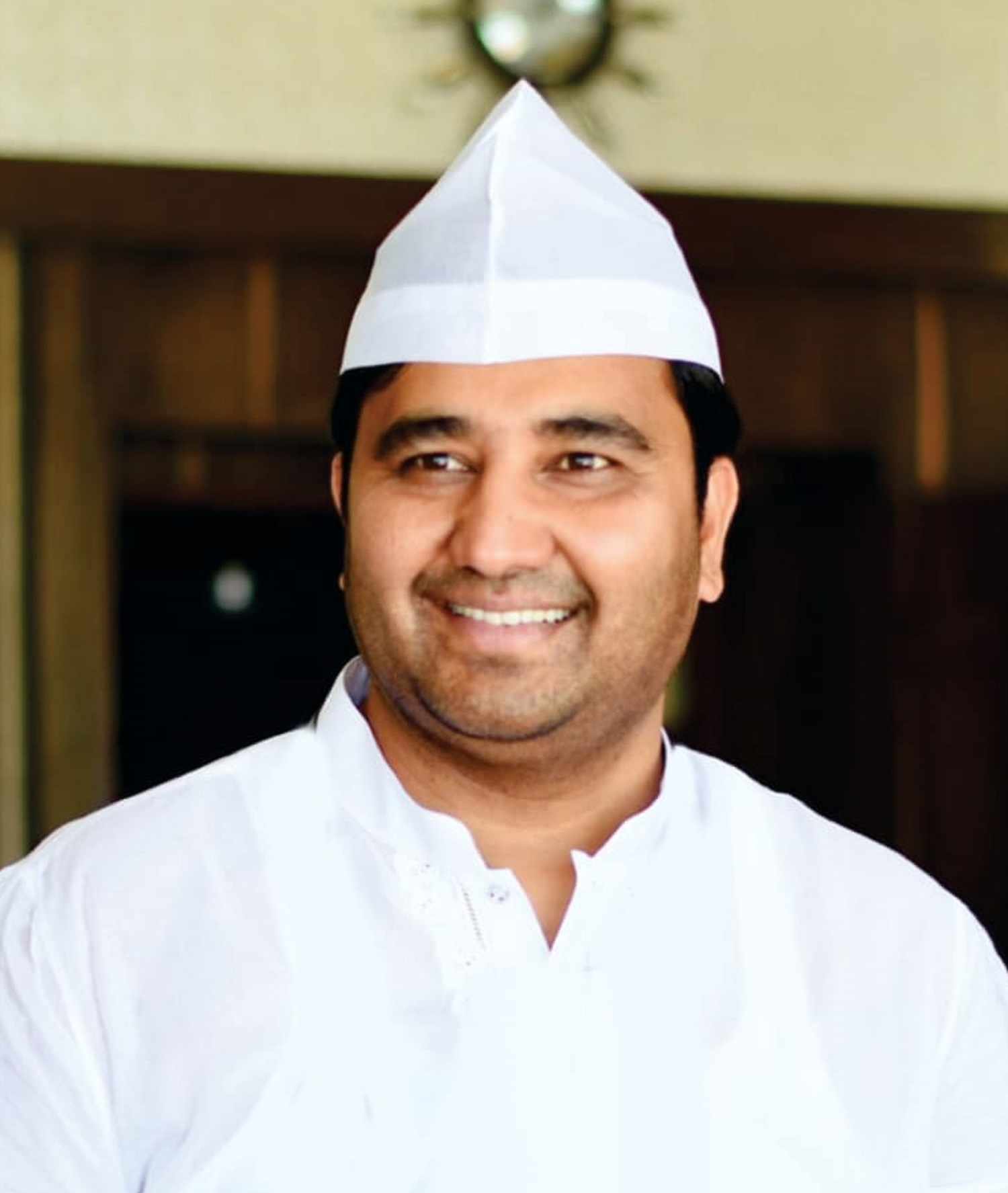
Haji Arafat Shaikh

Haji Arafat Shaikh is an Indian politician. He is a member of the Bharatiya Janata Party (BJP). He serves as President of the Maharashtra State Minority Commission and the President of the Maharashtra State Muslim Samaj Unit.

== Early life ==
He was born in Mumbai, Kurla in the Indian state of Maharashtra.

== Career ==
Haji Arfat Shaikh started his political career working with Bhartiya Vidhyarthi Sena, the student wing of Shiv Sena. He later joined the Maharashtra Navnirman Sena where became the party's vice-president and chief of the transport wing. Shaikh rejoined Shiv Sena in 2014 and became Shiv Sena's deputy leader and president of Maharashtra Shiv Vahatuk Sena, the party's transport wing.

He then joined BJP in September 2018, assuming the role of Chairman of the Maharashtra Minority Commission.
