= Holy Cross Church, Kurla =

Roman Catholic Church in Mumbai, India

Holy Cross Church
- Holy Cross Church, Kurla
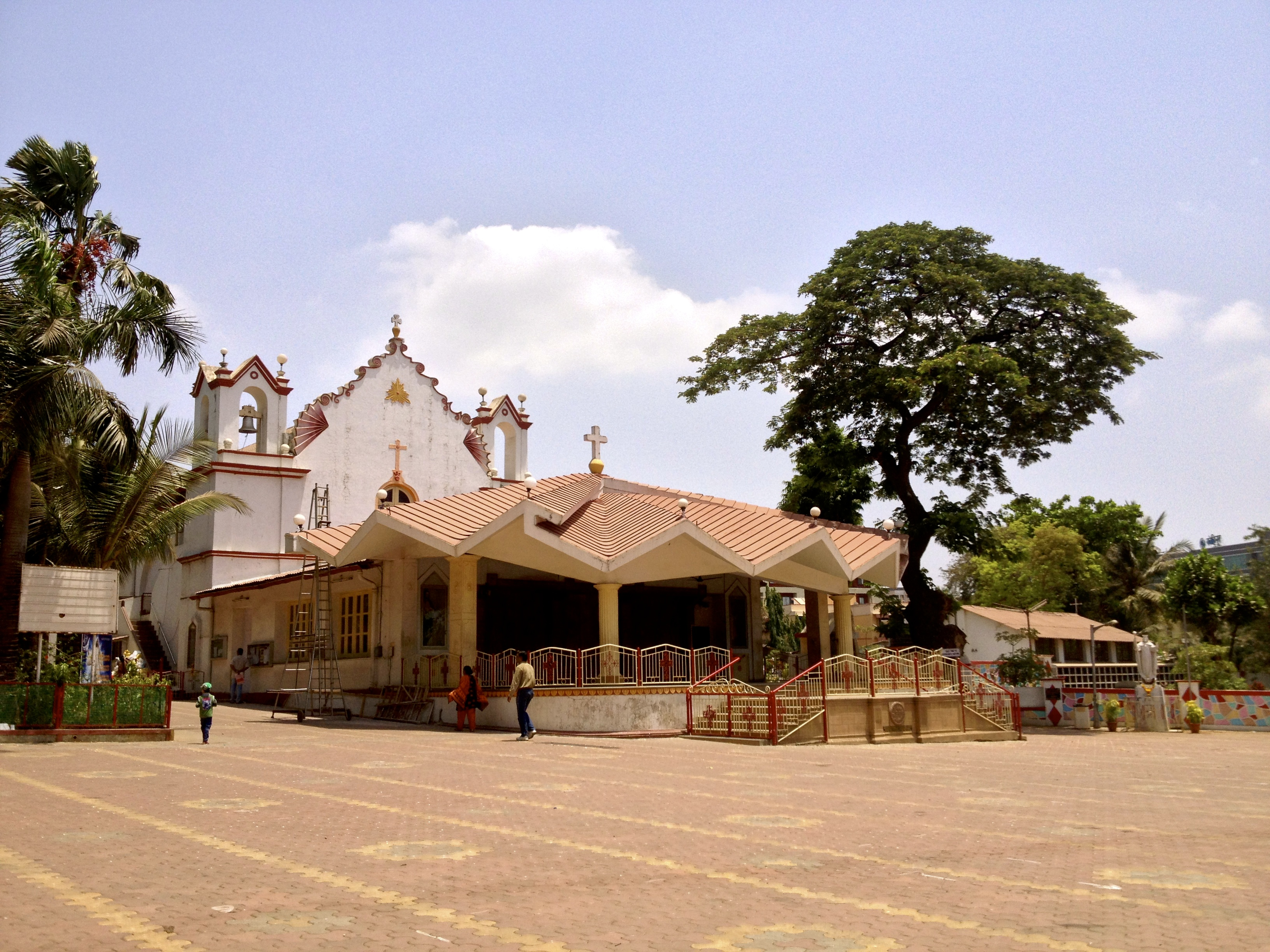
- Holy Cross Church
- 19°5′0″N 72°53′14″E
- Location: Kurla, Mumbai
- Country: India
- Denomination: Roman Catholic
- Website: http://www.holycrosschurch.co.in

History
- Former name: Church of Our Holy Saviour
- Status: Parish Church
- Founded: 1580; 446 years ago

Architecture
- Functional status: Active

Administration
- Archdiocese: Archdiocese of Bombay
- Deanery: Kurla Deanery
- Parish: Holy Cross Parish

Clergy
- Archbishop: John Rodrigues

Holy Cross Church, Kurla is a Roman Catholic Church in Kurla, a suburb of Mumbai, India. It was built during the Portuguese era by the Jesuits in 1588 and rebuilt in 1848. It is one of the oldest churches in Mumbai. The church belongs to the Archdiocese of Bombay.

== History ==
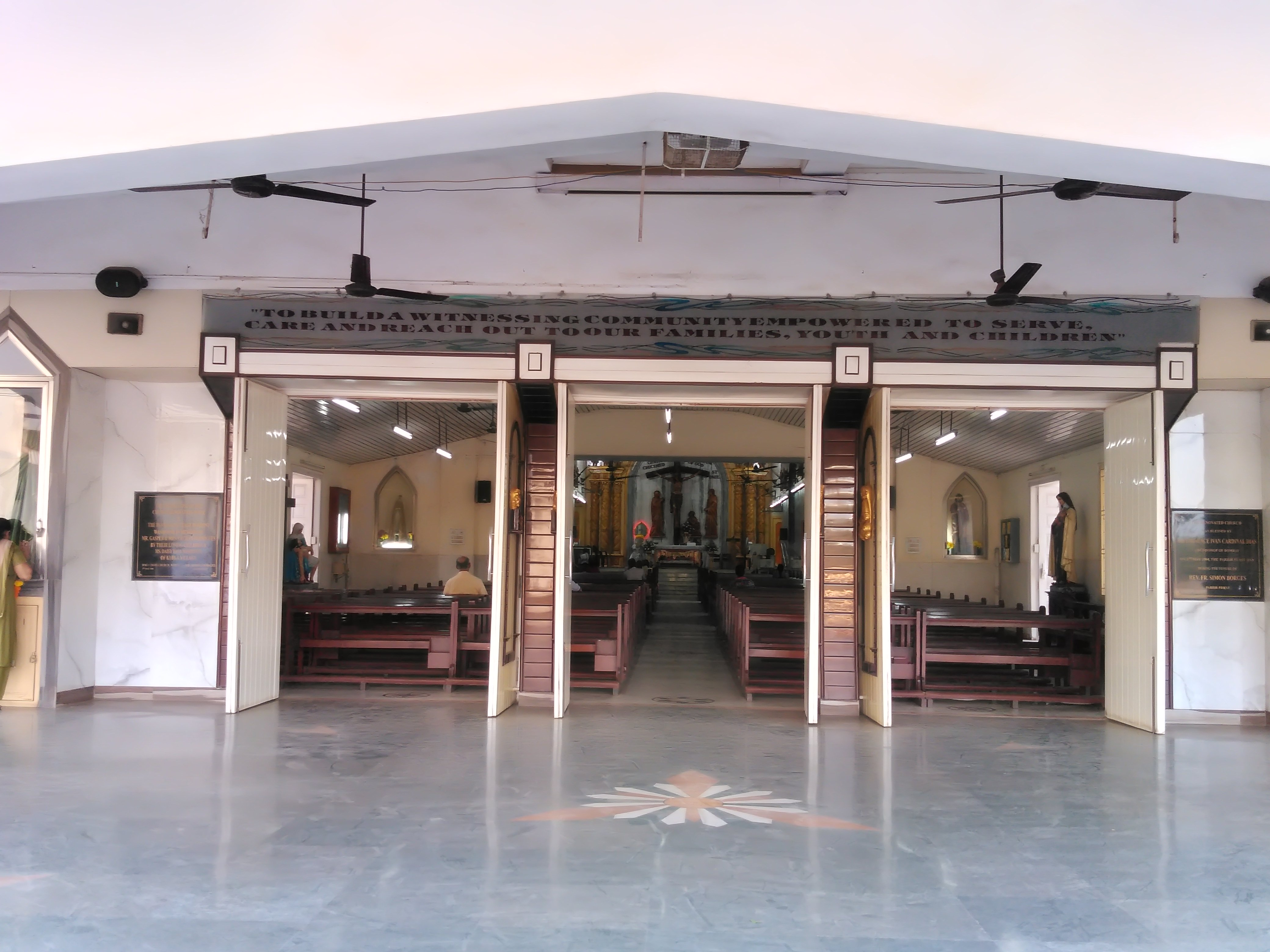
Church entrance

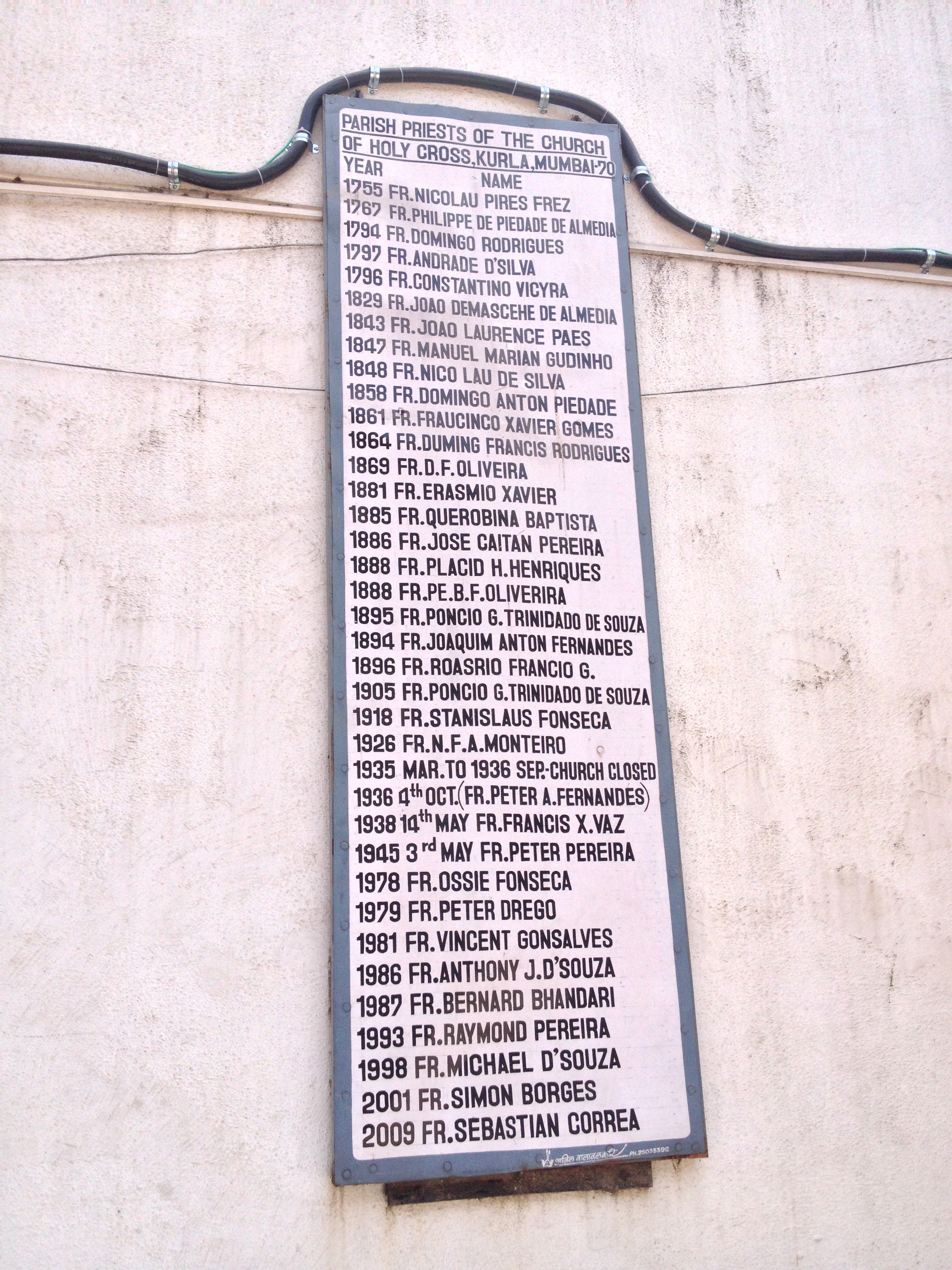
List of Parish Priests

St. Francis Xavier had written to the King of Portugal, requesting land near the village of Kurla on Salcette Island to build a church and residence. On 22 February 1570, King Sebastian of Portugal wrote from Evora confirming the donation of the Villages of Bandra and Kurla, as well as Saki and Mohili in favour of the Jesuits of St. Paul's College of Goa. This was because Goa was the headquarters of the Jesuits of Asia and St. Francis Xavier was the first Provincial Superior of India and the Far East. On 1 November 1572 this donation was re-affirmed by the Royal Court of Lisbon. The Jesuits came to Kurla and Bandra in 1573 and the first small Chapel was built in the same year. References were made in 1580 to "the Church built by the Jesuits of Bandra in 1580". By 1586, two Priests and two Brothers, residing at Bandra, cared for the parishioners of Kurla, spelt by the Portuguese of the time as "Curulem" or "Corlem". The Jesuits used to come on Sundays and Feast days of obligation to celebrate Mass, teach Catechism and help Catholics.

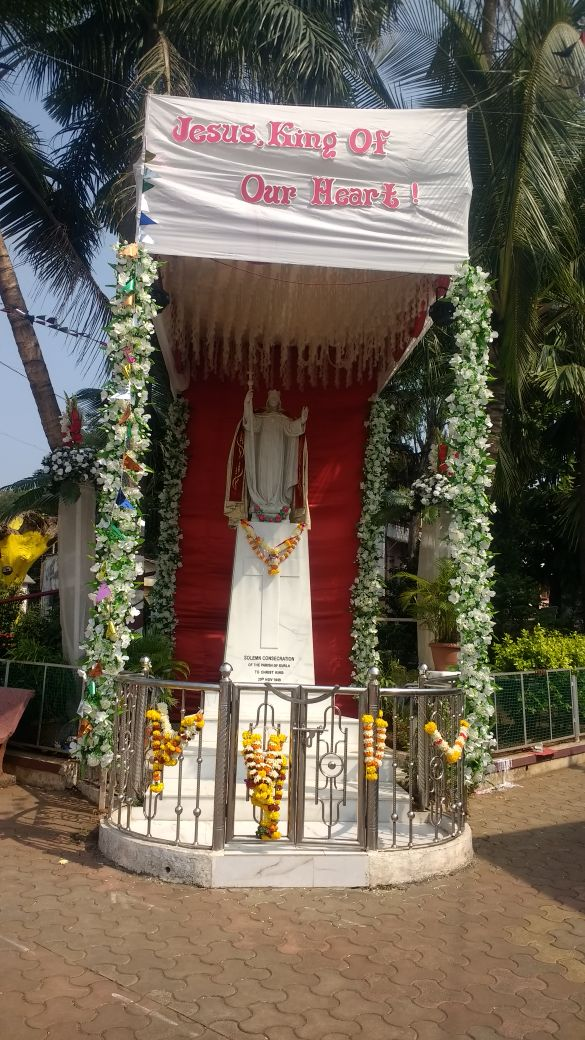
Christ the King statue installed at the entrance of the Church

The Church was initially called "Iglesia de San Salvador" (Church of Our Holy Saviour). The name was then changed to 'Invencao de Santa Cruz', Church of the finding of the Holy Cross which was soon shortened to "Church of the Holy Cross", presumably due to special devotions to the Cross of Christ as mentioned in the Annual Letters to Rome of Jesuits of India, found in the Monumenta Historica Societatis lesu and the Documenta Indica.

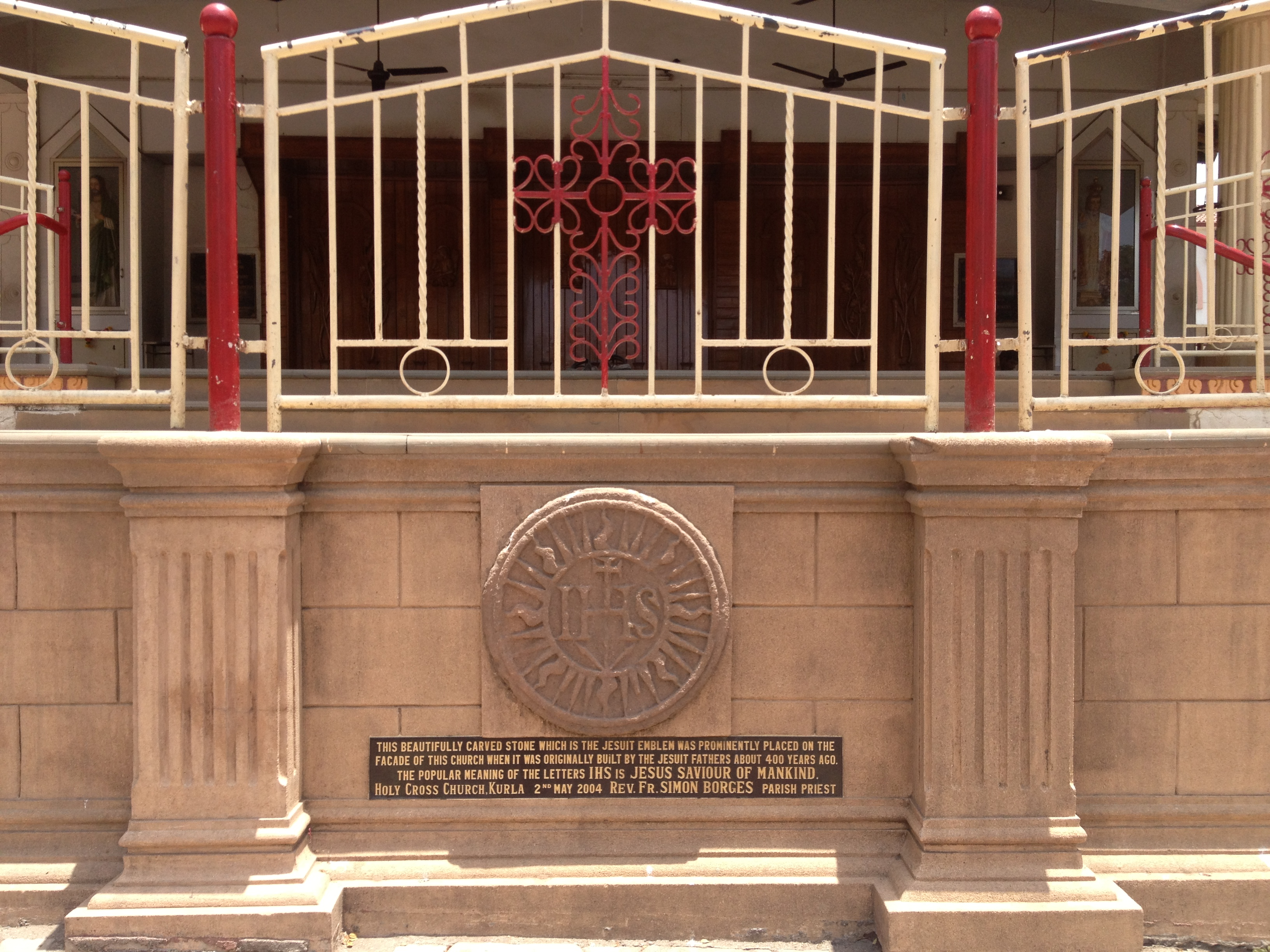
Jesuit Symbol Stone

During 1669 to 1739, The British ruled the Seven Islands of Bombay while Salsette Island was still in Portuguese hands. The Jesuit Church and the houses of Kurla were frequently threatened by bombardment from the Sion Hillock Fort, situated on the northern end of Bombay. Whenever the British had any grievances against the Portuguese, Kurla and Bandra, which lay immediately across the Mahim creek, suffered from these bombing reprisals. In 1739, the Church fell into the hands of the Marathas, and the Jesuits had to return. The Diocesan clergy then took over the administration of the parish.

The most drastic changes to the parish started taking place in the middle of the 20th century due to the continued influx of Catholics into the city and its Suburbs. The Catholic population increased appreciably which led to the carving of six new parishes from the original parish of Kurla. Our Lady of Fatima Church, kirol in 1953, St. Joseph, near Kurla Railway Station in 1968, St. Jude, Jeri Meri in 1972, St. Anthony, Saki Naka in 1975, Holy Family, Pestomsagar in 1982 and Infant Jesus, Ghatkopar in 1983 were established as independent parishes. At the turn of the century, the need for more accommodation in the church was felt and an extension and renovation of the Church structure was undertaken. Ivan Cardinal Dias released and inaugurated this project on 5 May 2004.

== Parish Fiesta ==
The Church celebrates its feast on the 3rd day of May every year. Since 2015 the local community of Bombay East Indians from the Kurla Christian Village organise a festival known as Holy Cross Parish Fiesta every year to celebrate the church feast There are float parades, East Indian singing competitions, East Indian Band, fancily dressed people, horsecarts taking part in the celebration. Villagers from Gorai, Manori, Kanjur, Malad, Sion, Kalina, Vakola, Vile Parle, Sahar and Marol also join in the celebration. On 5 May 2019, Fr. Milton Gonsalves released a book named Holy Cross Kurla which described the history of Kurla.

== Phool Dongri Cross ==
The Phool Dongri Cross (Cross on mount of flowers) is a miraculous cross erected on the mountain in Kurla during a plague pandemic (1689-1702). It was in the 1958, the cross was moved into the Holy Cross Church premises because the government needed the land to expand the Bombay airport and build a runway. The cross was later repaired and beautified in 2015 in the church premises. The church celebrates its feast locally called as Phool Dongri cha san on the second Sunday in the month of May every year.
