= Sion Causeway =

Causeway in Bombay, India

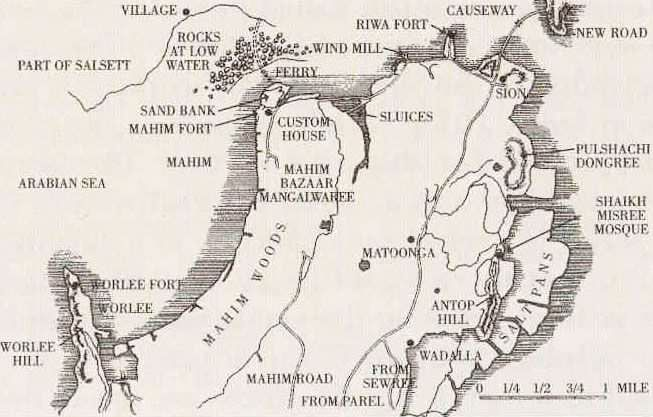
A 19th-century map of Bombay showing the Sion Causeway on the top right of the map

Sion Causeway (also known as Duncan Causeway) is a major causeway in Bombay, India which connects Sion in Bombay with Kurla in Salsette. The construction of the causeway began in 1798 and was completed in 1805 by Jonathan Duncan, Governor of Bombay (1795–1811), at a cost of £5,037 (Rs. 50,370). In 1826, its breadth was doubled and improved at a further outlay of £4,000 (Rs. 40,000) A volcanic tract extends from Carnac Bunder to Sion Causeway, and forms the entire of the chain of hills bordering the north-eastenn end of the island from the Sewri Fort to Sion.

== Bombay and Salsette islands ==
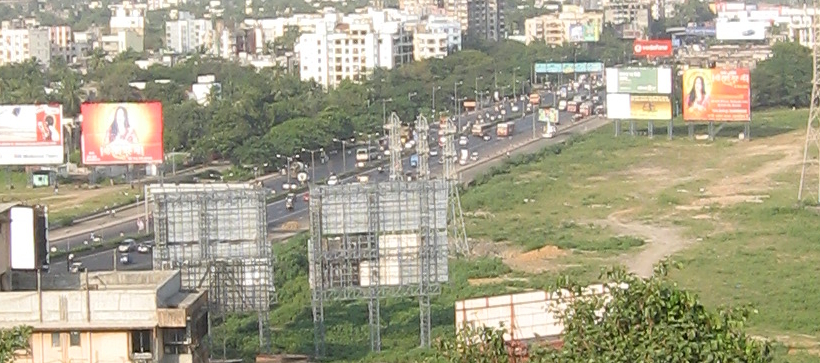
Picture of the causeway, now part of the Eastern Express Highway, in 2008.

Bombay city was originally an archipelago of seven islands of Bombay, Parel, Mazagaon, Mahim, Colaba, Worli, and Old Woman's Island (also known as Little Colaba). The Treaty of Bassein placed the islands into Portuguese possession in 1534. Charles II of England received possession of the islands in 1661 as the dowry of Catherine of Braganza. Charles II later leased the islands to the British East India Company in 1668. After the completion of the causeway, the villages of Sion in Bombay and Kurla in Salsette were connected. Accessibility considerably increased after construction of this causeway.

== Architecture ==
The Sion causeway is 935 yards long and 24 feet wide, and the roadway is raised to a maximum height of nine feet above the swampy ground. The side walls are of plain stone and lime masonry with earth and stone filling between.

At the south end of the causeway is a tablet with the following inscription:

This causeway was begun in May 1798, and was finished in January 1805 during the administration of the Honourable Jonathan Duncan, Esquire. It cost Rs. 50,374. It was doubled in width, and other improvements added, in 1826, under the Government of-the Honourable Mountstuart Elphinstone, at a further cost of Rs. 40,000. The causeway was originally, constructed under the superintendence of Captain William Brooks, of the Engineers; and the additions and the improvements made in 1826 under that of Captain William A. Tate of the same corps

== Transport ==
It is used at all seasons of the year, and, during the dry weather, there is a great traffic. Carts laden with cotton and coal for the Kurla Spinning and Weaving Mills, yarn and cloth from the mills, shell-lime, grass, stones, salt, and other articles, brought into Bombay from different parts of Thane, are carried over the causeway.

== Toll ==
A toll on the causeway used to yield a yearly revenue of £2700 (Rs. 27,000). The toll rates were: 1s. (8 as.) for a four-wheeled carriage with one or two horses; 6d. (4 as.) for a palanquin or for a loaded two-wheeled carriage drawn by two bullocks; 3d. (2 as.) for a two-wheeled carriage, loaded or empty, drawn by one bollock; 2s. (Re. 1) for an elephant; 3/4d. (6 pies) for a camel, horse or bullock; 3/8d. (3 pies) for a donkey; and 1/8d. (1 pic) a head for swine, sheep, or goats. The custom duties which were levied for transport between Bombay and Salsette were also abolished after the construction of this causeway.
