= Phoenix Marketcity (Mumbai) =

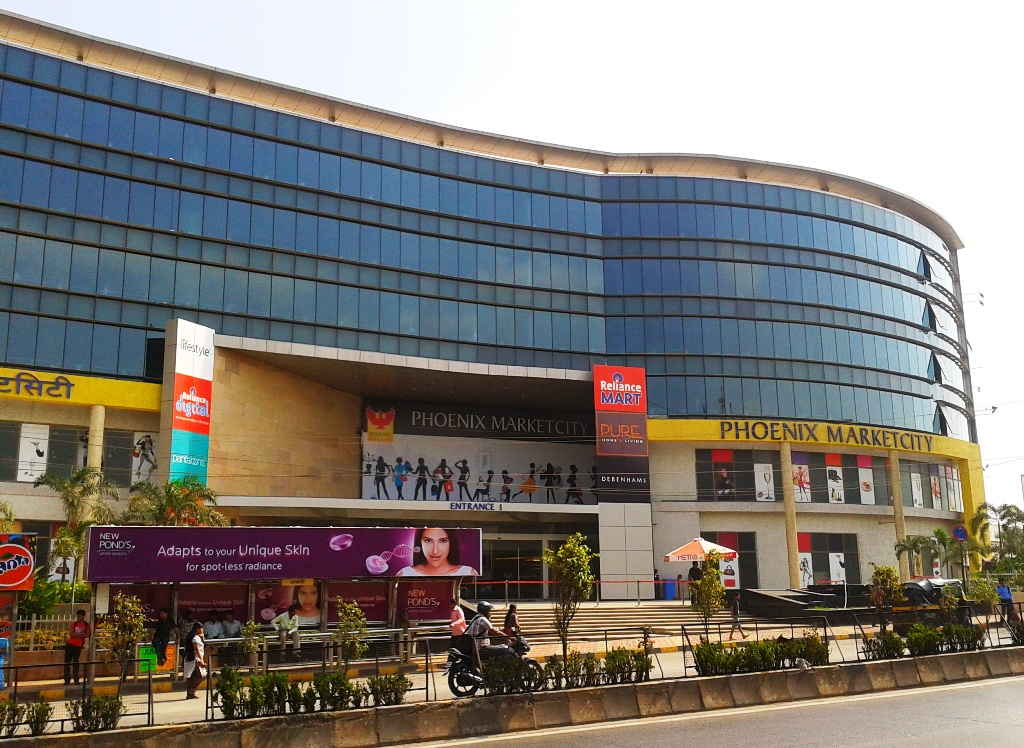
- Location: Kurla, Mumbai, India
- Coordinates: 19°04′15″N 72°52′41″E
- Opened: November 2011
- Manager: Atul Ruia
- Owner: The Phoenix Mills Co. Ltd
- Architect: Benoy
- Num. of stores: 600+
- Floor area: 2,100,000 square feet (200,000 m^{2})
- Floors: 4
- Parking: 2,200+
- Website: www.phoenixmarketcity.com/mumbai

Phoenix Marketcity is situated in Kurla, Mumbai. It is developed by The Phoenix Mills Co. Ltd., and has a total retail space area of 1.14 million square feet. It houses 311 stores with domestic and foreign brands, including PVR Cinemas, which has 14 movie screens, and 70 restaurants. Its sister mall in Mumbai is High Street Phoenix, located in Lower Parel.

The nearest railway stations are Kurla railway station and Vidyavihar railway station. The nearest bus stop is Kamani.

== Gallery ==
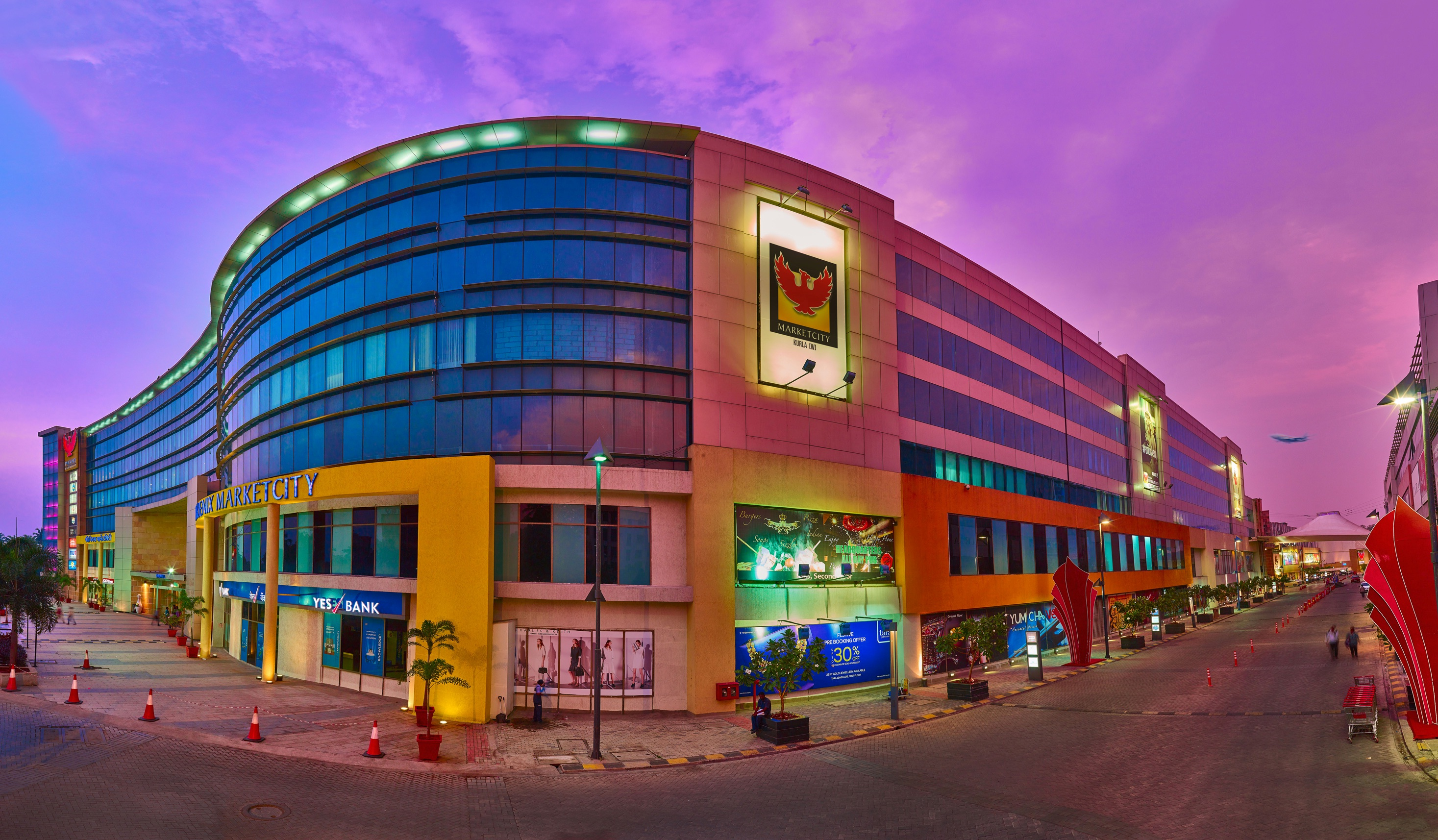
Phoenix Marketcity, Mumbai

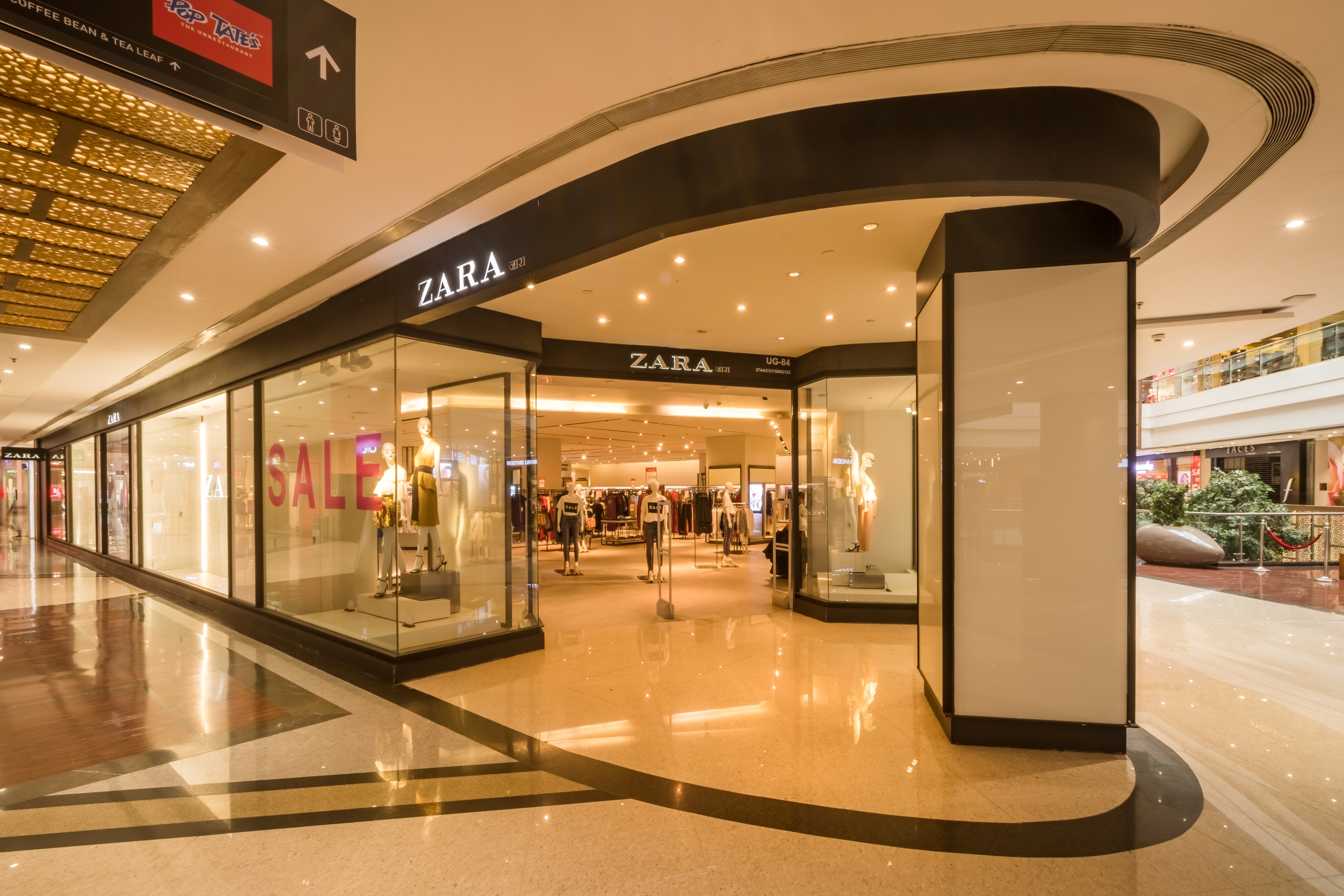
Zara at Phoenix Marketcity, Mumbai

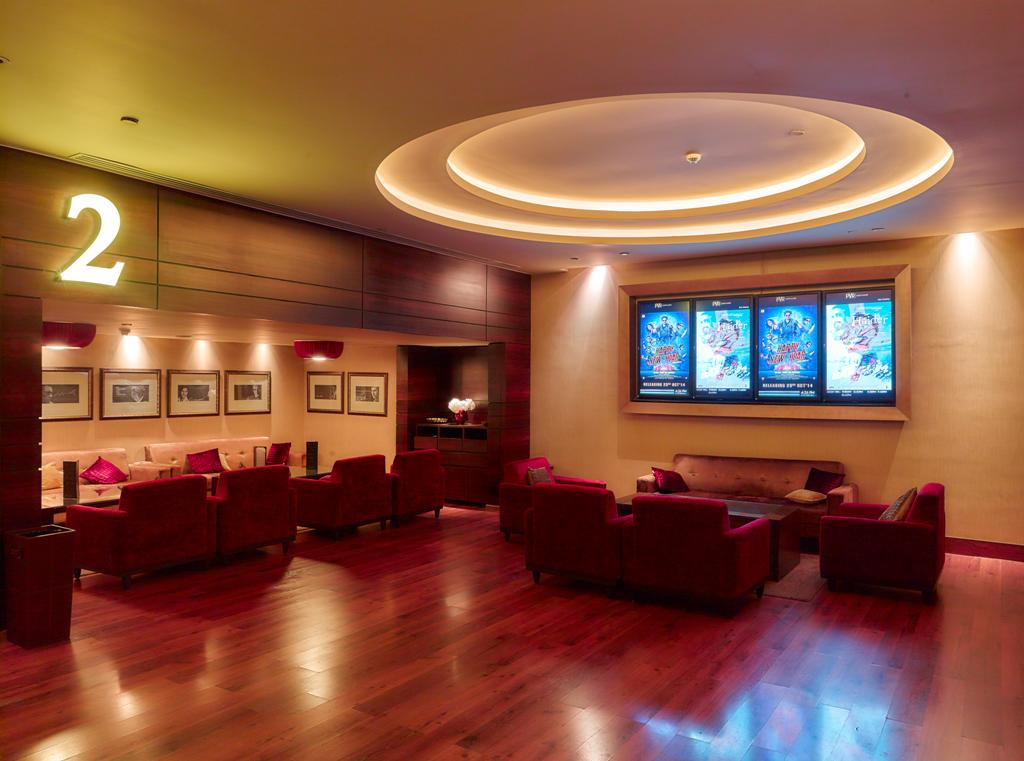
PVR Cinemas at Phoenix Marketcity, Mumbai

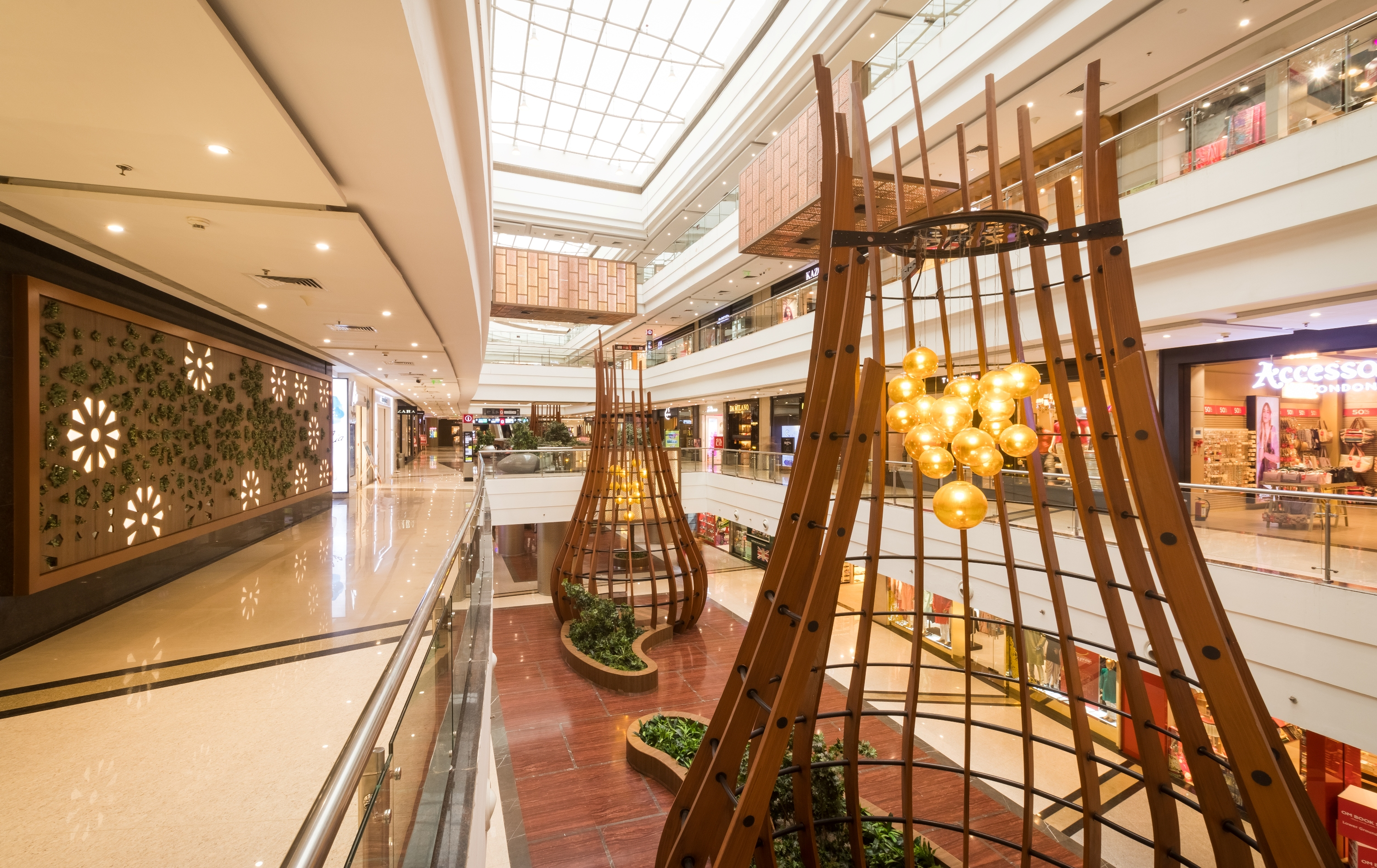
Phoenix Marketcity, Mumbai

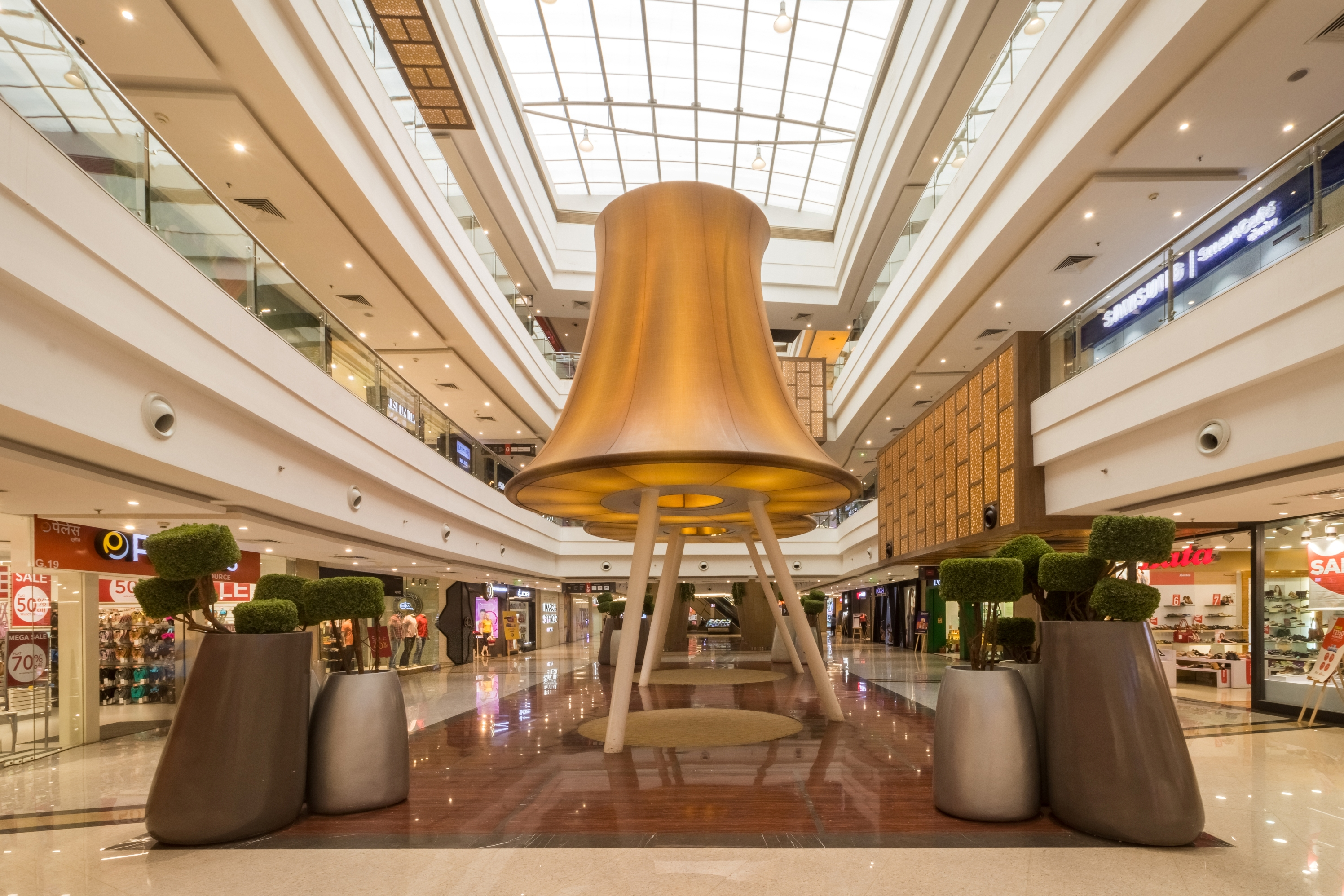
Phoenix Marketcity, Mumbai

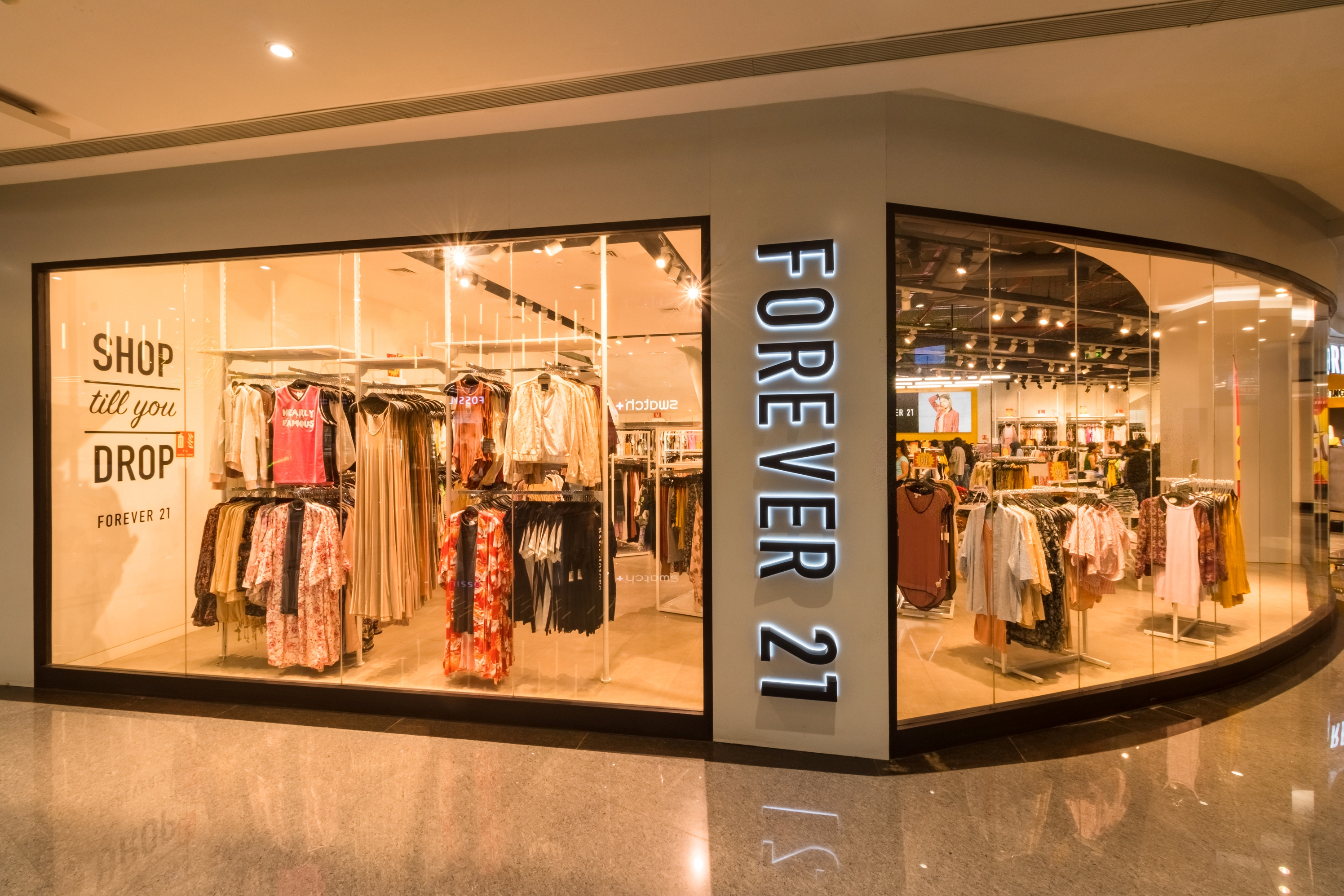
Forever 21 at Phoenix Marketcity, Mumbai

== See also ==
- High Street Phoenix
- Phoenix Marketcity (Bangalore)
- Phoenix Marketcity (Chennai)
- Phoenix Marketcity (Pune)
- List of shopping malls in India
