= Salsette Island =

Island off the coast of Maharashtra, India

Salsette
Native name: साष्टी
- Satellite view

- Location within Maharashtra

Geography
- Location: Arabian Sea
- Coordinates: 19°12′N 72°54′E
- Area: 619 km^{2} (239 sq mi)
- Highest elevation: 467 m (1532 ft)
- Highest point: Kanheri Peak (Sanjay Gandhi National Park)

Administration
- India
- Largest settlement: Mumbai

Demographics
- Population: 23,729,378 (estimated)
- Pop. density: 38,335/km^{2} (99287/sq mi)
- Ethnic groups: Maharashtrians (53%), Gujaratis (22%), North Indians (17%), Sindhis (3%), Telugus (2%), Others (3%)

Salsette Island, also known as Sashti Island, is an island in Konkan division of the state of Maharashtra, along India's west coast. The cities of Mumbai (Mumbai City district and Mumbai Suburban district), Thane and Mira-Bhayandar (both part of Thane district) lie on it, making it one of the most populous islands in the world. The island forms the central part of the Mumbai Metropolitan Region and has a population of more than 20 million inhabitants living on an area of about 619 square kilometres (239 sq mi).

== Location ==
Salsette is bounded on the north by Vasai Creek, on the northeast by the Ulhas River, on the east by Thane Creek and Mumbai Harbour, and on the south and west by the Arabian Sea. The original seven islands of Bombay, which were merged by land reclamation during the 19th and early 20th centuries to form the city of Mumbai, are now practically a southward protruding peninsula of the much larger Salsette Island.

The island of Trombay that was to the southeast of Salsette is today part of Salsette as much of the intervening swamps have been reclaimed. It contains Sanjay Gandhi National Park, also known as Borivali National Park. The city of Thane is at the northeastern corner, on Thane Creek, while the western suburbs of Mumbai which stretches from Bhayandar in the northwest corner to Bandra which lies just before the Mumbai City district, lies on its western side while the eastern suburbs of Mumbai that stretch from Thane to Kurla lie on the eastern half of the island. Both suburbs are separated by the Sanjay Gandhi National Park till the neighbourhood of Powai in Andheri. Politically, the Mumbai City district covers the peninsula south of Mahim and Sion while most of the original island constitutes the Mumbai Suburban district. The northern portion lies within Thane district, which extends across Thane creeks onto the mainland.

== History ==
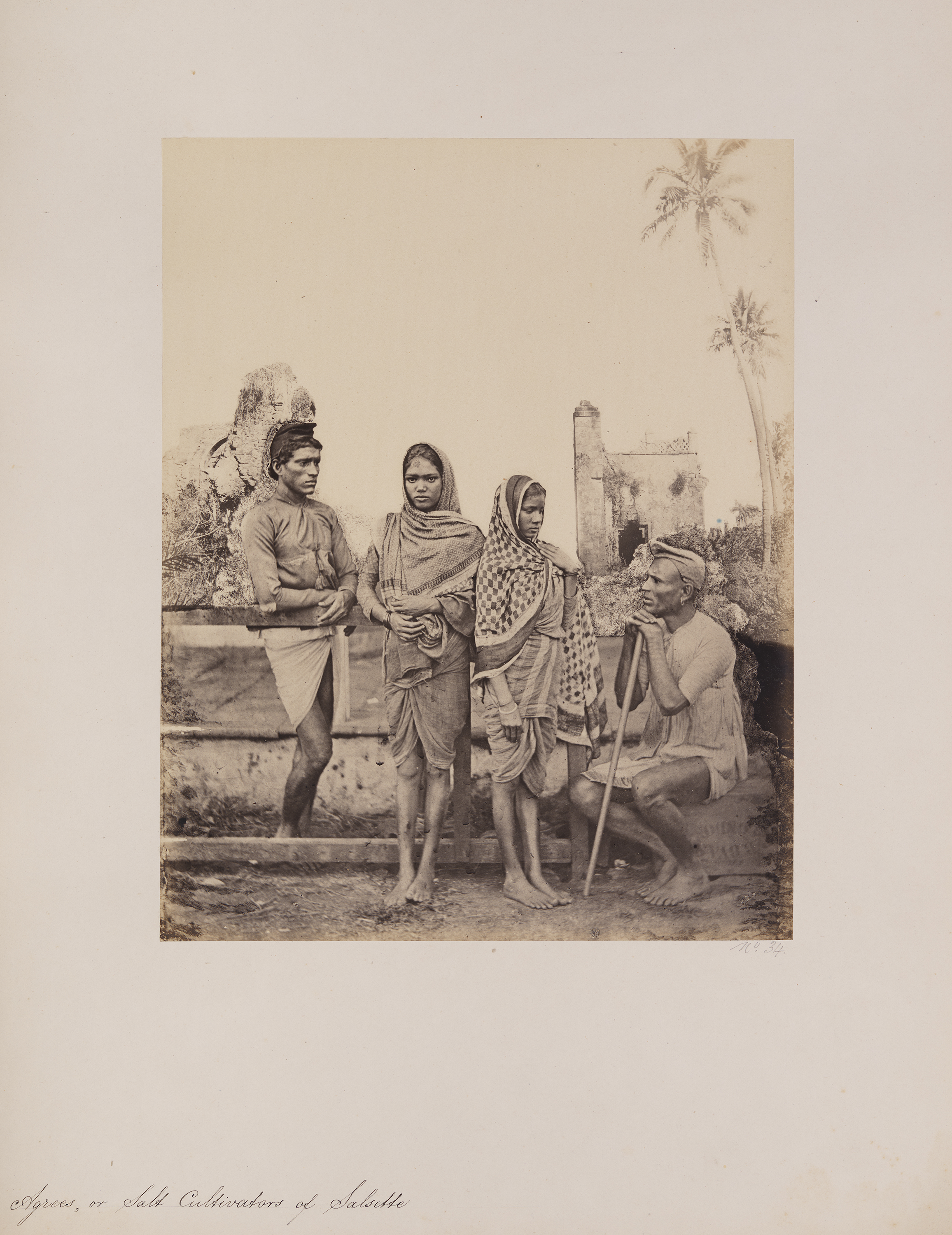
Aagri people of Salsette (c. 1855)

The word Sasashti (षट्षष्टि ṣáṭṣaṣṭi, also shortened to Sashti) is Maharashtri Konkani term for "sixty-six", referring to the original "sixty-six villages" on the island. It was inhabited by farmers (Aagri, Kunbi), agriculturists, toddy tappers (Bhandaris), artisans (Sutar, Malis) and fisherfolk (Kolis) who trace their conversion to Christianity back to 55 AD with the arrival of Christ's disciple, Bartholomew the Apostle, in north Konkan region. They were later converted to the Latin Church in India by four religious orders—the Dominicans, Franciscans, Augustinians and Jesuits— who arrived in the 15th century with the Portuguese. These original inhabitants of Salsette are the Bombay East Indian Catholics, the Aagris & Kolis.

109 Buddhist caves, including those at Kanheri, can be found on the island, and date from the end of the 2nd century. Salsette was ruled by a succession of Hindu kingdoms, the last of which were the Silharas and later the Marathas. In 1343, the islands were annexed by the Sultan of Guzerat.

In 1534, the Portuguese Empire seized the islands from Sultan Bahadur Shah. Sashti became part of the northern province of Portuguese India, which was governed from Vasai (Bassein) on the north shore of Bassein Creek. It was leased to the explorer Diogo Rodrigues from 25 October, 1535 to 1548. In 1554, the islands were handed over to Garcia de Orta, a renowned physician and botanist and the author of Colloquies on the Simples Drugs and Medical Matter of India, a seminal work on Indian Eastern medicine of its time.

Nine churches were built on Salsette island by the Portuguese; Nirmal (1557), Nossa Senhora dos Remédios (1557), Sandor (1566), Agashi (1568), Nandakal (1573), Papdy (1574), Pale (1595), Manickpur (1606), and Nossa Senhora das Mercês (1606). The St Andrews Church and the Mount St Mary's Church in Bandra, the Cross at Cross Maidan, Gloria Church (1632) in Mazgaon and the remnants of a church in Santa Cruz are the sole places of worship that have survived to the 21st century.

In 1661, the seven Bombay (Mumbai) islets were ceded to Britain as part of the dowry of Catherine de Braganza to Charles II of England; while Salsette remained in Portuguese hands. Charles II in turn, leased the Bombay islets to the English East India Company in 1668 for £10 per year. The company found the deep harbour at Mumbai (Bombay) eminently apposite, and the population rose from 10,000 in 1661 to 60,000 by 1675. In 1687, the East India Company transferred their headquarters there from Surat. In 1737, the island was captured by Maratha violence, all of the Portuguese northern province in India, except Damaon, Diu & Silvassa, as it was frequently invaded by the Maratha forces until 1739. Marquis de Pombal formally ceded what would become Greater Bombay, to Peshwa Balaji Bajirao of the Maratha Confederacy in the 1750s.

The British occupied Salsette in 1774, and it was formally ceded to the East India Company in the 1782 Treaty of Salbai. In 1782, William Hornby, then Governor of Bombay Province, initiated the project of connecting the islets of Bombay. By 1845, the seven southern islands had been connected to form South Bombay, with an area of 435 km². Railway viaducts and causeways were built in the 19th century to connect Bombay Island to the mainland via Salsette. The channels separating Mumbai from Salsette and Trombay were bridged by the Sion Causeway in 1803. Accessibility considerably increased after construction of this causeway. Mahim and Bandra were connected by the Mahim Causeway in 1845.

These railway lines and roads encouraged wealthier merchants to build villas on Salsette. By 1901, the population of Salsette had increased to 146,993 and the area began to be referred to as Greater Bombay.

== Geography ==
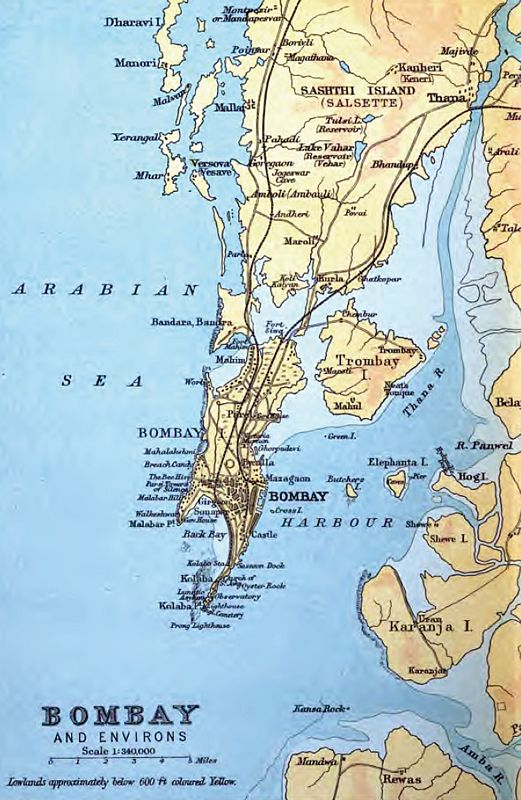
1893 map showing the island

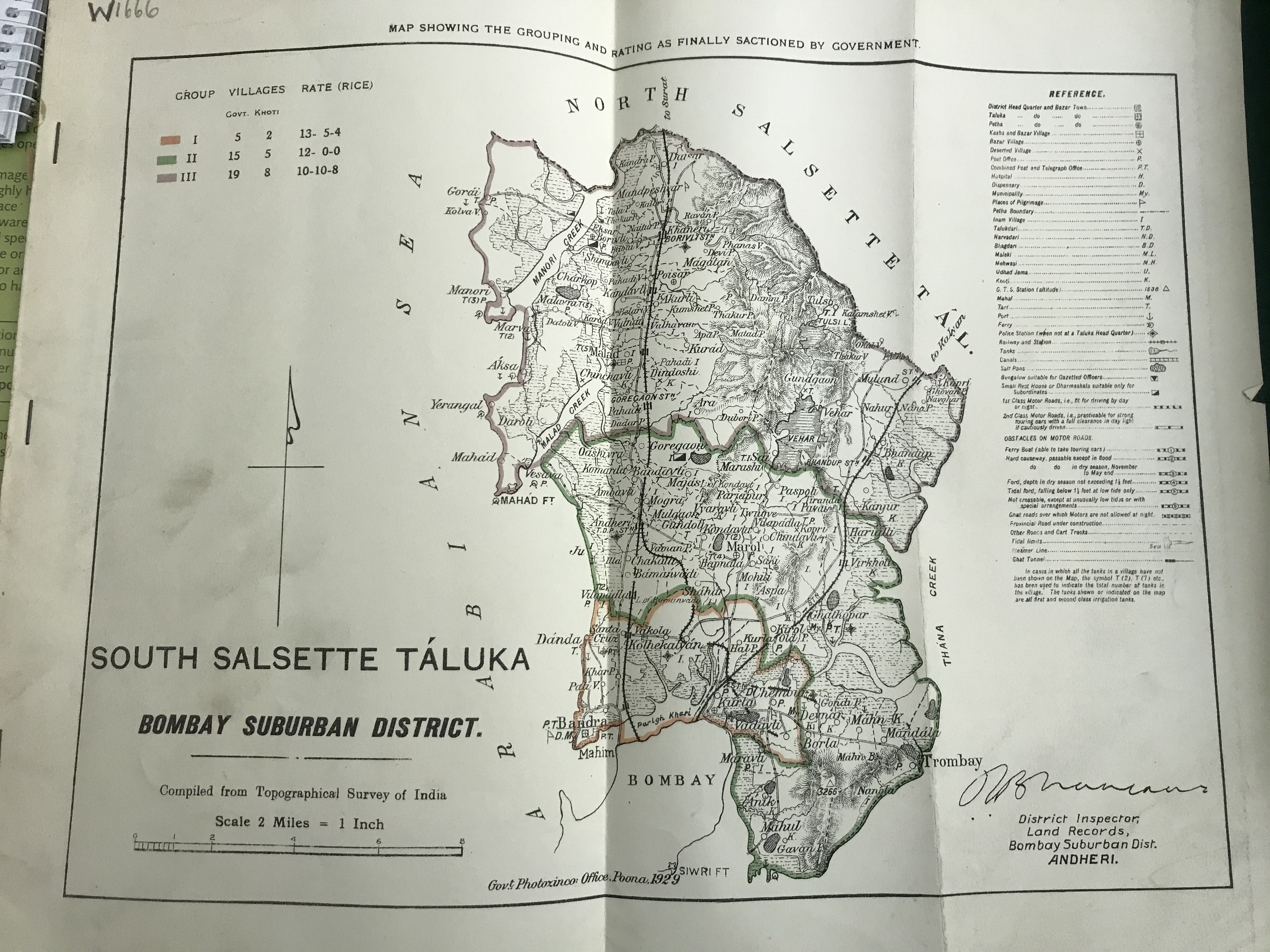
1929 Map Salsette Land Records Office

Salsette is dominated by a central mass of hills surrounded by tidal flats. A number of much smaller islands lay on its western flank. These included Bandra, Khar Danda, Juhu (an old linear sand bar rising above sea level by just a metre or two), Versova, Marve Island, Dharavi Island and Rai Murdhe, all with a knoll core and fringing wave-cut platforms and sandy beaches. These islands seem to have remained separate until as late as 1808.

At the time of writing of the old Gazetteer of Thana in 1882, these islands could be reached during low tides by walking across the tidal inlets in between, except for the island of Dharavi in present-day Gorai (not to be confused with the slum near Mahim), which had to be reached by a boat. These are no longer separate, being joined to Salsette via reclamation. The highest point is the conical peak of Kanheri (467 metres) in Borivali National Park on the northern reaches of the island. This national park is the world's biggest within city limits.

=== Geology ===
The island is at the confluence of a number of fault lines. This makes the area earthquake-prone, up to a magnitude of 6. The island is mostly composed of black basalt rock. Since it is along the sea coast, it has a sandy belt on its western coast. The southern region of Old Mumbai is mostly at sea level. However, the parts which were erstwhile shallows are below sea level. Many parts of the city are hilly.

=== Other natural formations ===
==== Lakes ====
There are three major lakes on the island: Powai Lake, Tulsi Lake and Vihar Lake. The latter two supply part of Mumbai's water requirements. Numerous other smaller ponds and lakes are present.

==== Rivers ====
The Mithi River (Mahim), Poisar River, Oshiwara River and Dahisar River originate in the national park and empty into the Arabian Sea. The Mithi River originates at Vihar Lake. Vasai and Thane creeks are estuarine distributaries of the Ulhas River.

==== Creeks ====
A number of saline or brackish creeks extend inland from the coastline. Mahim Creek separates the city from the suburbs in the west. Further north on the western coast, the Oshiwara river empties into Malad (or Marvé) Creek and the Dahisar River into Gorai Creek. The eastern waterfront also has many small creeks.

==== Wetlands ====
The small southern part of the eastern waterfront of Salsette forms Mumbai Harbour.

North of this region lie vast amounts of protected wetlands at Sewree, home to migratory birds. The northern and northwestern part of the island and parts of Mahim River have government-protected marshlands. These swampy regions form massive, dense mangrove forests.

== See also ==
- Navi Mumbai (New Mumbai)
