= Kurla =

Suburb of Mumbai, India

- Suburb
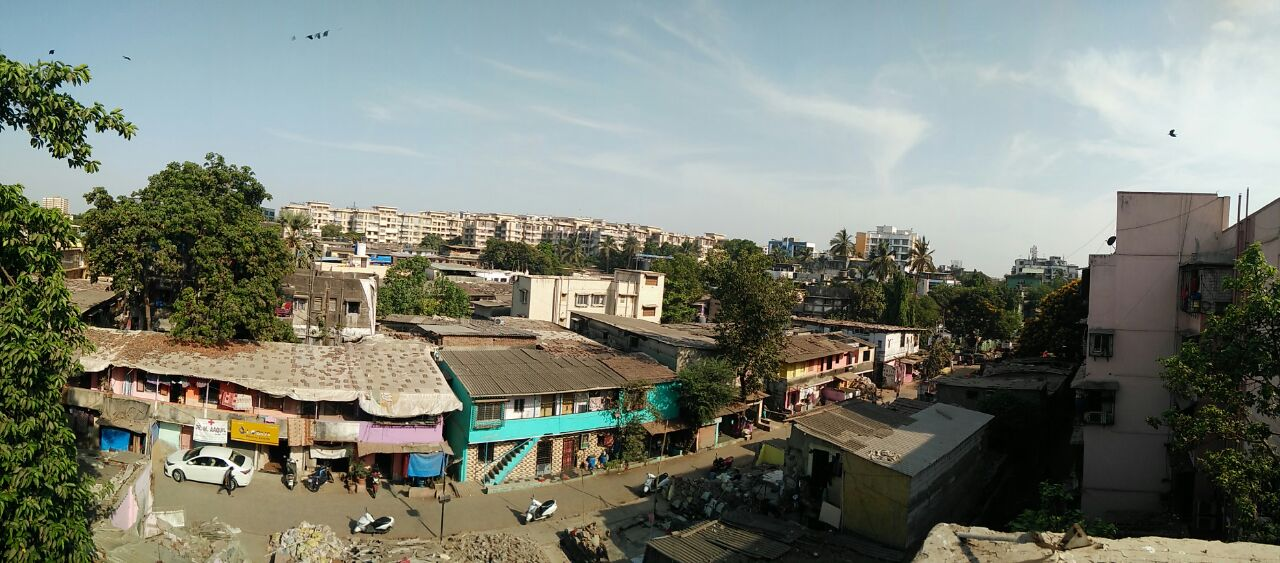
- Panaromic view of East Indian village of Kurla

- Kurla, Mumbai, Maharashtra
- Coordinates: 19°04′21.4″N 72°53′04.2″E
- Country: India
- State: Maharashtra
- District: Mumbai Suburban
- City: Mumbai

Government
  - Type: Municipal Corporation
  - Body: Brihanmumbai Municipal Corporation (MCGM)
- Elevation: 18.18 m (59.6 ft)

Languages
  - Official: Marathi / Urdu
- Time zone: UTC+5:30 (IST)
- PIN: 400070 and 400072 west 400071
- Area code: +9122
- Vehicle registration: MH 03
- Civic agency: BMC

Kurla (Pronunciation: [kuɾlaː]) is a suburb of East Mumbai, India. It is the headquarters of the Kurla taluka of Mumbai Suburban district. The neighbourhood is named after the eponymous East Indian village that it grew out of. It falls under Zone 5, Ward 'L' of the Bombay Municipal Corporation. Its railway station, spelt as Coorla until 1890, is one of the busiest on the Mumbai suburban railway on the central and harbour railway lines of Mumbai as is the Lokmanya Tilak Terminus (LTT) for out-station passenger/express trains.

== History ==
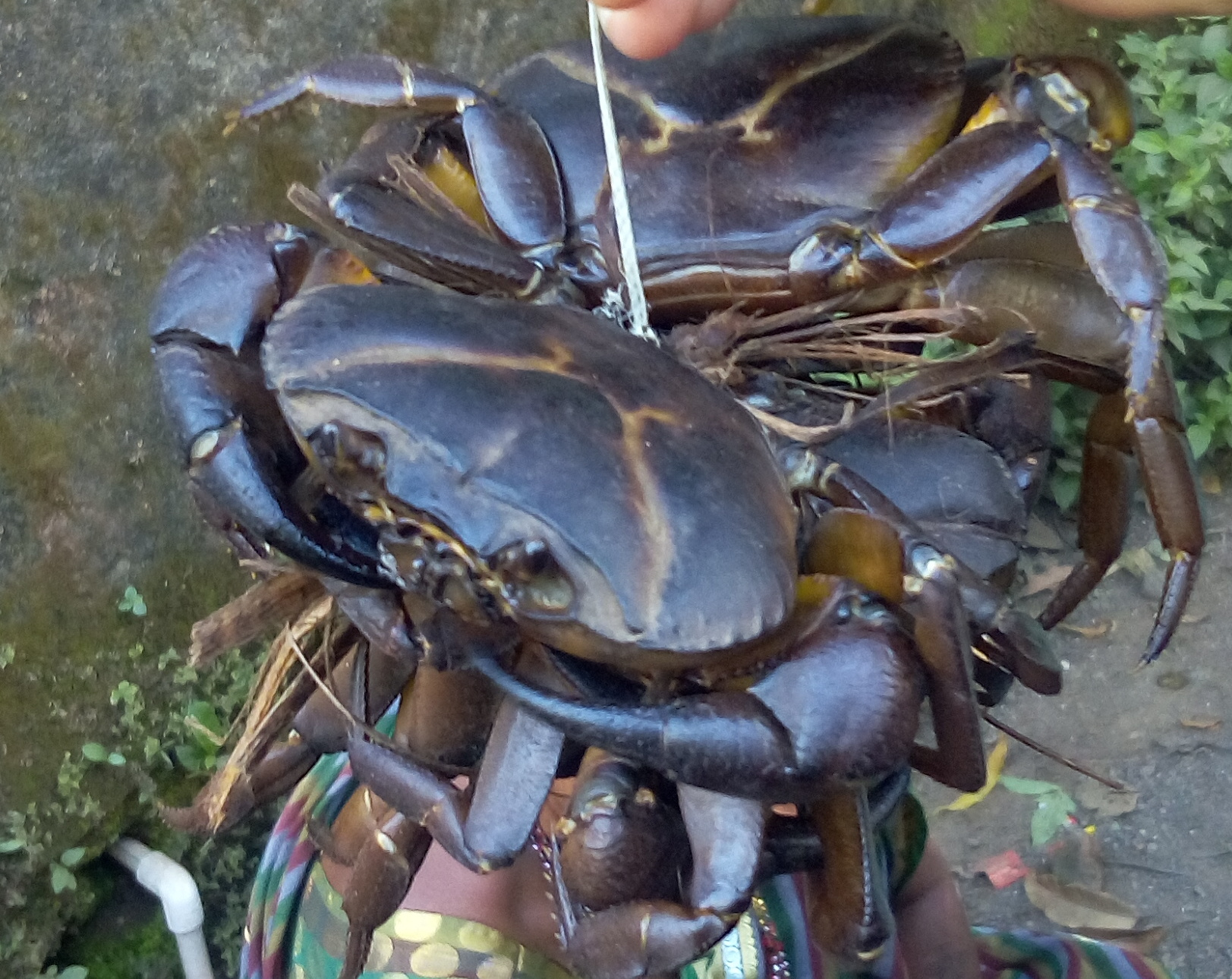
Kurli crab on which the Name of Kurla is kept

Kurla gets its name from the East Indian village of Kurla, whose name, in turn, originated from "Kurli", the local name for crab, as these were found in plenty in the marshes in the vicinity of the village. The village of Kurla came under Portuguese rule when the Treaty of Bassein (1534) was signed by Sultan Bahadur of Gujarat and the Kingdom of Portugal on 23 December 1534. In 1548, the village of Kurla and six other villages were given by the Governor of Portuguese India to Antonio Pessoa as a reward for his military services. Kurla remained under Portuguese rule until the British occupied Salsette Island in 1774. The island was formally ceded to the East India Company in the 1782 Treaty of Salbai.

In 1805, Kurla was connected to Sion on Bombay Island by the Sion Causeway. Coorla, as it was spelt during the British Raj until 1890, was a major station on the Great Indian Peninsula Railway between Bombay and Thane, the first railway line in British India, when it opened in 1853.

In 1808, Kurla, along with the villages of Mohili, Kolekalyan, Marol, Sahar, Asalphe, and Parjapur, were given by the British to a Parsi merchant of Bombay, Mr. Hormasji Bamanji Wadia in exchange for a piece of land near the Apollo pier gate in Bombay. His Son, Mr. Ardeshir Hormasji Wadia, after whom the A. H. Wadia Road was named, paid for them a yearly Quit-rent of £358 (Rs. 3587).

Kurla had two cotton mills, one of them, the Dharamsi Punjabhai, being the largest cotton spinning and weaving mill in the Bombay Presidency, with 92,094 spindles and 1280 looms. The other was the Kurla Spinning and Weaving Mill. Kurla village had a population of 9,715 at that time. About half of them worked in the mills, while the rest were fishermen, husbandmen (farmers), and salt-makers. The Holy Cross Church at Kurla, built during the Portuguese rule and rebuilt in 1848, is one of the oldest churches in Mumbai.

The Mithibai Hormasji Wadia Dispensary was built by Mr. Bamanji Hormasji Wadia in 1855, and endowed by him with £1200 (Rs. 12,000). It was in charge of an assistant surgeon, and, in 1880–81, had an attendance of 7367 out-patients. The salt pans covered an area of about 66 acres (270,000 m^{2}) and yielded a yearly revenue of £3418 (Rs. 34,180). There was also a considerable manufacture of shell lime. The Stone quarries of Kurla were well known and supplied material for the construction of most of the city's famous heritage buildings like the Prince of Wales Museum, and the General Post Office among others.

The beginning of the twentieth century saw Kurla develop as an important centre of the mill industry. In 1910, there were reported to be several mills in Kurla, engaged in the manufacturing of cotton cloth and woollen cloth in steam factories. Kurla, however, was an old textile industrial core, an outlier to the main cotton mill zone. A relatively cheaper land value and nearness to water and power mains enabled rapid industrial expansion of the suburbs and the Kurla-Ghatkopar–Vikhroli–Bhandup belt soon developed into the largest industrial zone in the suburbs of Mumbai.

The Central Railway began its Harbour Line services from Kurla to Reay Road station on 12 December 1910. This service was extended to Victoria Terminus in 1925. The Kurla Railway Car-shed was constructed in 1925 when electrification of the Great Indian Peninsula Railway (GIPR) Harbour line was undertaken. The first electric train in Asia that ran between CST and Kurla on 3 February 1925 was maintained at this car shed. The Salsette–Trombay Railway, also known as the Central Salsette Tramway, opened in 1928. The 13-kilometre line, a project of the Bombay Improvement Trust, run by the GIPR, ran from Trombay to Andheri via Kurla and lasted only a few years.

Premier Automobiles Limited built their first automobile assembly plant in Kurla in 1946 and began production in March 1947, collaborating with American automobile manufacturer Chrysler to manufacture Dodge, Plymouth, and Desoto models in India. The iconic Premier Padmini car was also built at Kurla from 1964 until the plant closed down in 1997. This resulted in the development of the old Kurla neighbourhood into an automobile industrial zone during the late fifties and sixties.

The Bombay Taximen Union began building the Taximens Colony close to the Mithi river, in Kurla in 1969. It was inaugurated by union leader George Fernandes in 1972. The Bombay Taximens Cooperative housing society is Mumbai's second largest housing society.

The Dairy Development Department of the State Government, in order to cope-up with the increasing demand for milk, established a dairy at Nehru nagar, Kurla (East) in 1975.

== Geography ==
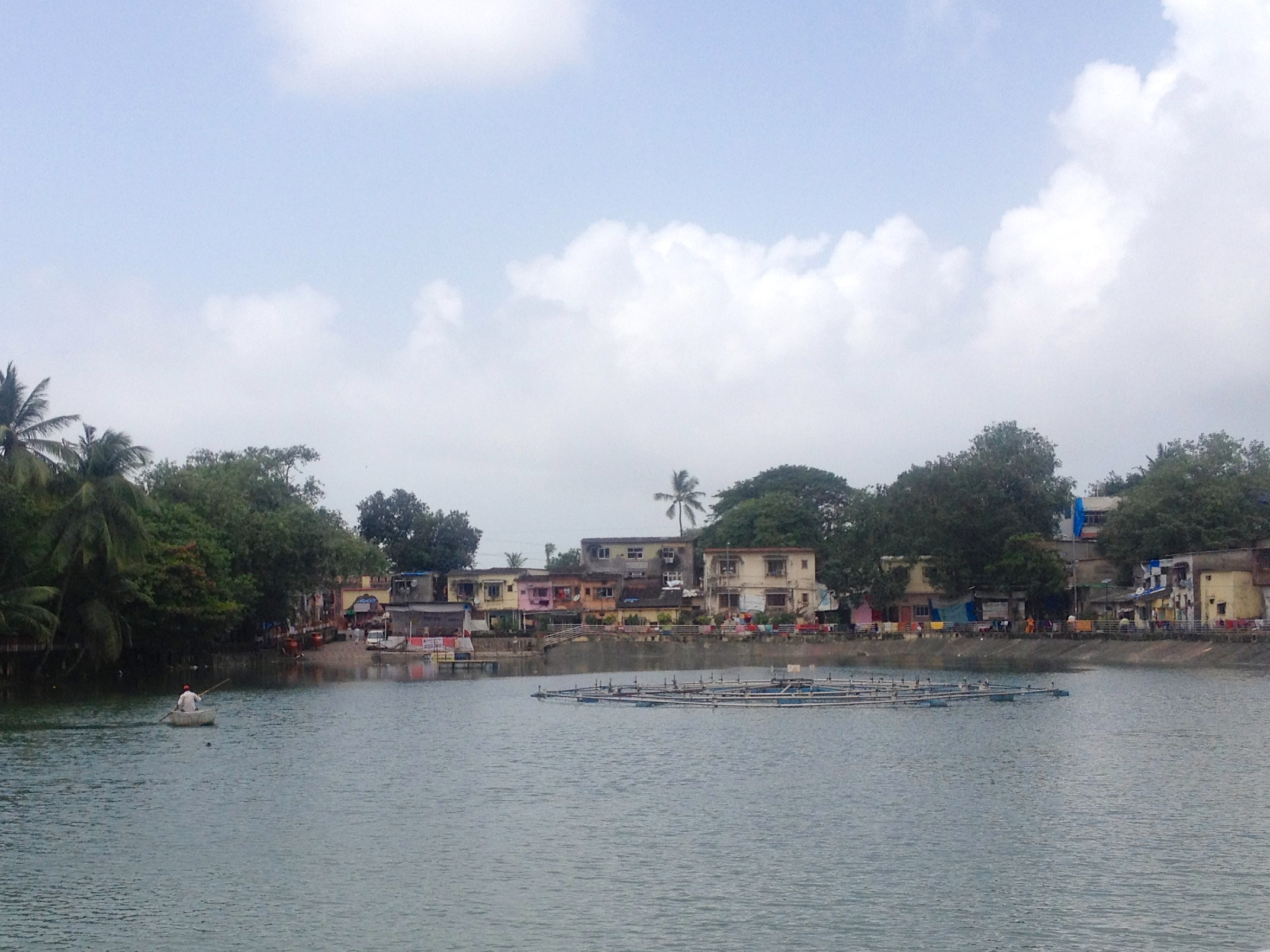
Sheetal Pond or Talao

Kurla lies on the southern end of Salsette Island along the east bank of the Mithi River. Kurla may be divided into two parts: Kurla (East) and Kurla (West), separated by the Central Railway line. Kurla East is bordered by the suburban neighbourhoods of Chunabhatti in the south, Chembur in the East and Ghatkopar in the North. Kurla West is surrounded by Ghatkopar and Saki Naka neighbourhood of Andheri East to its North, Kalina and the Bandra Kurla Complex to its West and the Sion – Dharavi area to its south across the Mahim Creek. The Mithi River enters into Kurla's north-west corner near Sakinaka, running south along the Chhatrapati Shivaji International Airport boundary wall and the Bail Bazar locality, past the CST road and Taximens colony areas and empties into the Mahim Creek at the southern end of Kurla.

== Administration ==
Kurla is the headquarters of the Kurla taluka of Mumbai Suburban District. The taluka was carved out of South Salsette Taluka in 1920. It covers an area of 135 square kilometres, covering a total of 29 villages in two circles. This taluka occupies the east side of the district and is bordered by the Bandra taluka in the West, the Sanjay Gandhi National Park to the northwest, the Thane District in the north, the Thane Creek to the east, and Mumbai City district to the south.

The entire suburb falls under Zone 5, Ward 'L' of the Brihanmumbai Municipal Corporation. The Ward municipal offices are located in the Municipal market building on S. G.Barve Road. Residents of Kurla come under the Kurla (Vidhan Sabha constituency) (Number 174). The number of electorates in 2009 was 284,951 (male 161,459, female 123,492).

== Localities ==
Kurla displays an urban blend of residential colonies, big and small, industrial estates commercial enclaves and slums. The L-Ward has the highest number of public open spaces subject to encroachment in the city with 80 of its 139 open spaces being encroached upon.

=== Old Kurla ===
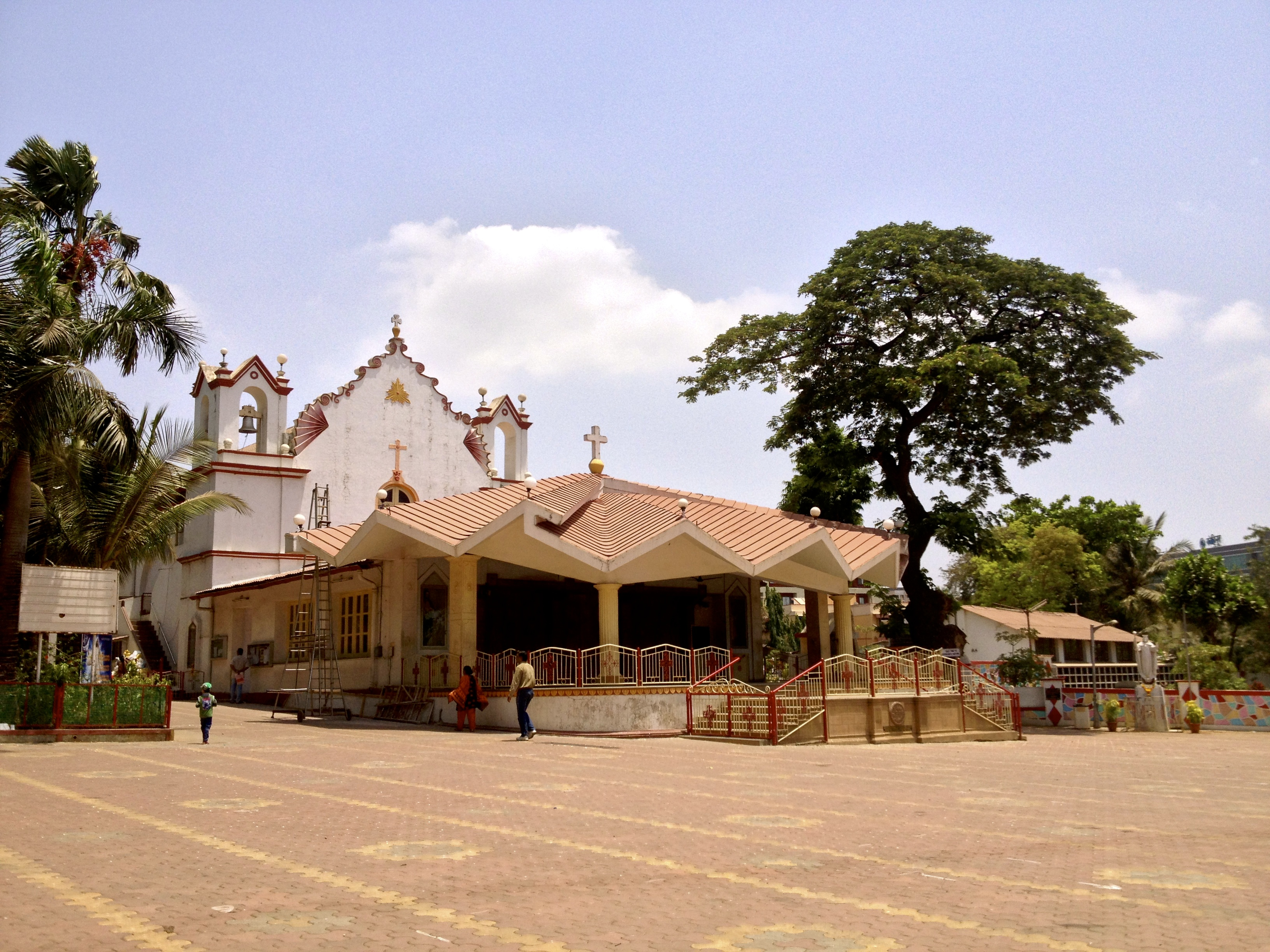

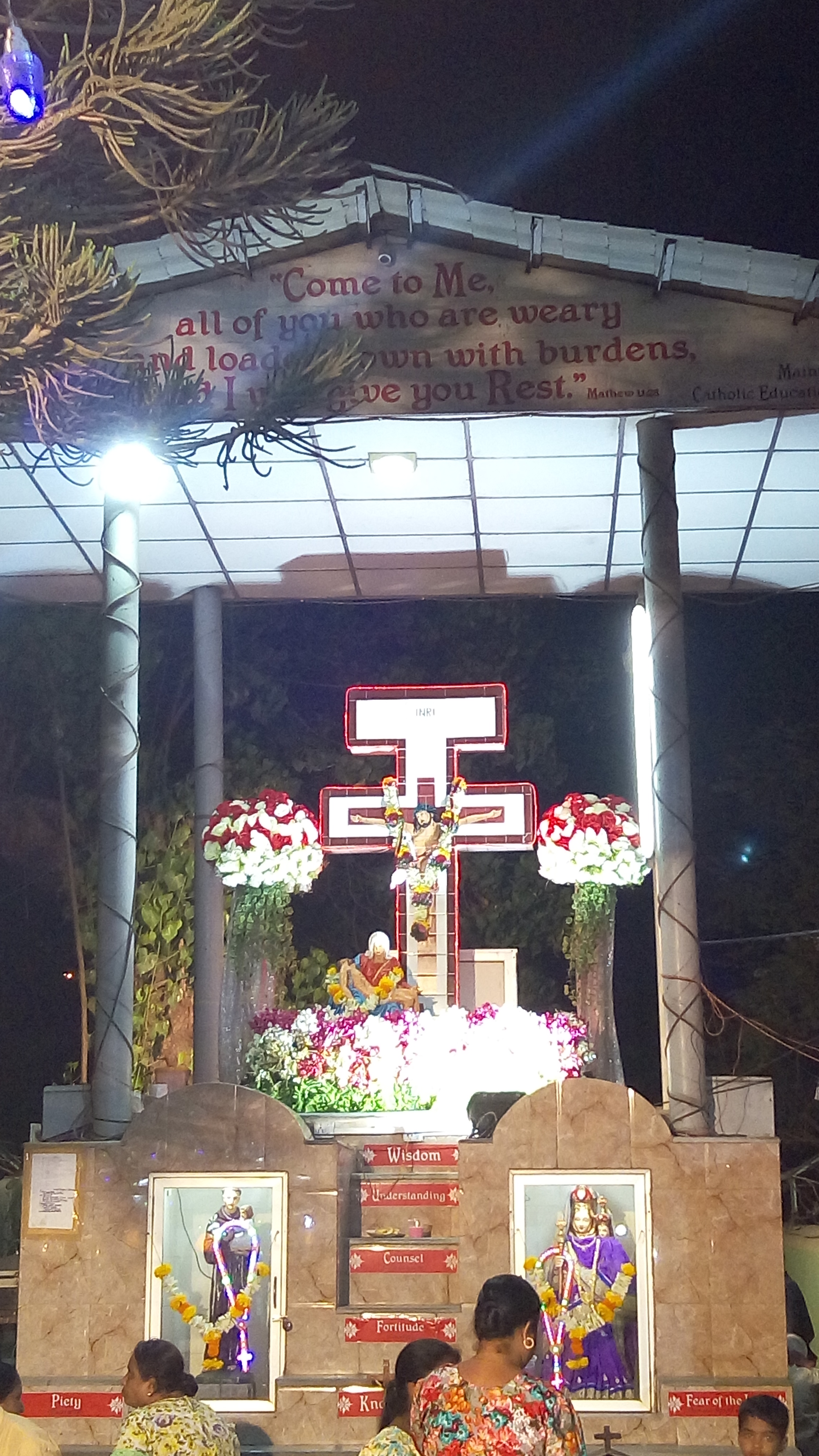

The earliest settlements in Kurla were in this area in the northern end of Kurla West. It consists of the Kurla Christian Village, an East Indian pocket of Christians who stem from Portuguese and Koli traditions, and the adjoining predominantly Christian Hall Village and Culbavour.

=== Kohinoor city ===
Kohinoor city is an integrated township in Kurla west, comprising about 900,000 sq ft of commercial space and about 300,000 sq ft for retail, residential, hospitality and education. promoted by Kohinoor Group founded by Manohar Joshi. The site was formerly a motorcar manufacturing company called Premier Automobiles Limited which used to manufacture its famous Padmini car here. The factory was closed and the Joshis bought 36-acres from Premier Automobiles in 2005. The neighbouring Premier residency buildings by HDIL and the Slum Rehabilitation Authority (SRA) buildings were built on land previously owned by Fiat Automobiles.

== Transport ==
Kurla is accessible from all parts of Mumbai by road and rail due to its central location.

=== Roads ===
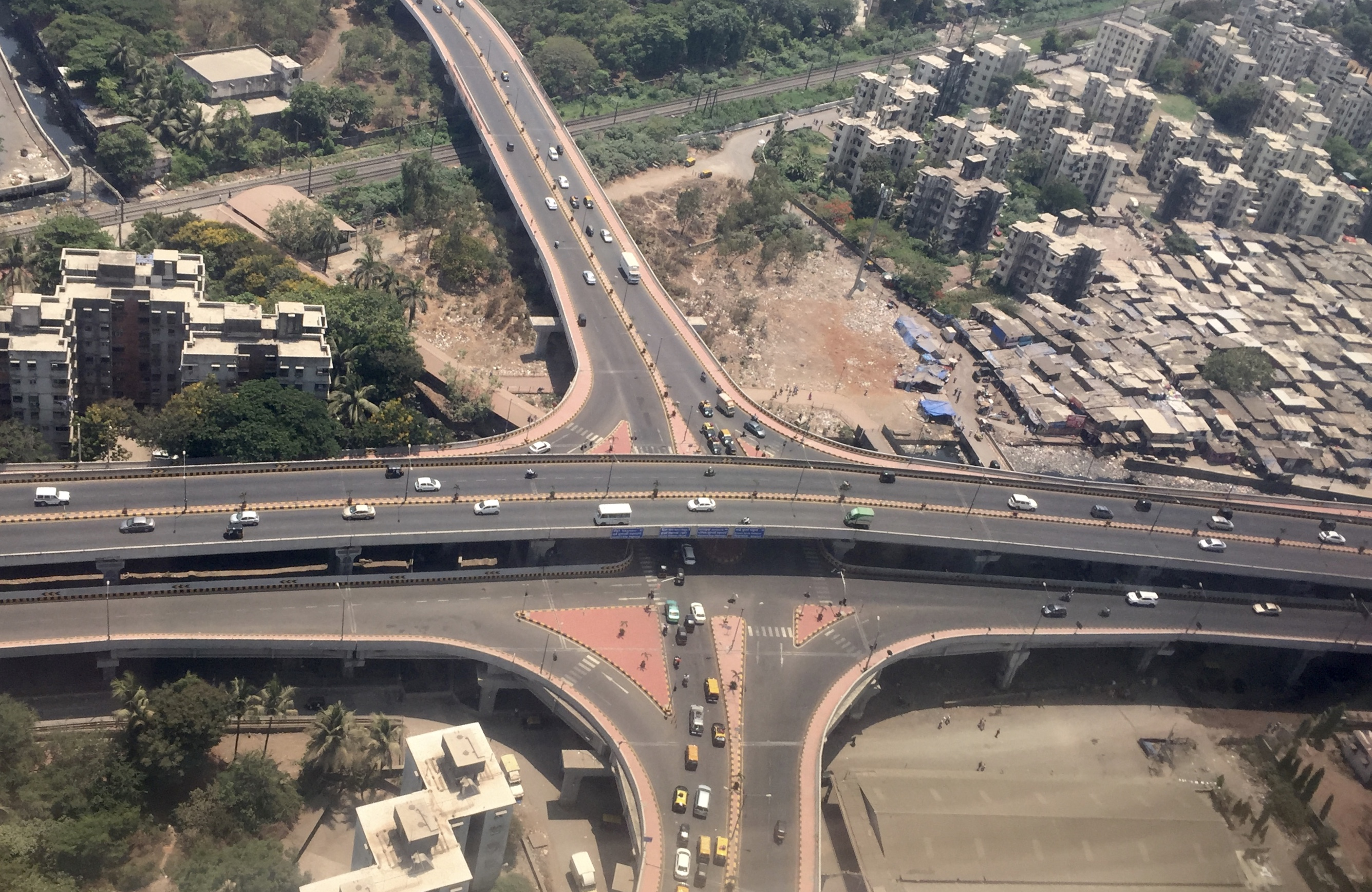
Double decker flyover on the Santacruz – Chembur Link in Kurla (East)

The Lal Bahadur Shastri Marg (formerly known as Old Agra Road) is the arterial road for Kurla West. The road begins at the southern end of Salsette Island, passing through Kurla and continuing up north into Ghatkopar towards Thane. The Andheri – Kurla road links Kurla with Andheri via Saki Naka, The road is notorious for its long traffic jams. while CST road (Central Salsette Tramway Road) leads to Santacruz. The Kurla Depot Junction is one of LBS marg's busiest junctions, with one arm proceeding towards the Western Express Highway and the other leading to the Santacruz-Chembur Link Road flyover.

The 6.45 kilometre long Santa Cruz – Chembur link road was opened in April 2014. It connects the east and west sides of Kurla via a Road over bridge (ROB) over the Central railway line, which is also the city's first double-decker flyover The road finally connects to the Eastern Express Highway at the Amar mahal junction. The Eastern Express Highway is the main thoroughfare for Kurla East. It runs from Sion Causeway in the south to Mulund in the North.

BEST buses travel from Kurla to all areas of Mumbai. The Kurla BEST Depot on the west suffered serious damage during the Mumbai floods of 2005 and has since been shut for redevelopment. Buses from this depot used to cater to Mumbai University (Kalina Campus), Bandra Kurla Complex and Chembur. Maharashtra State Road Transport Corporation buses ply from their depot at Nehru Nagar in the East to major towns in the State. Auto rickshaws and taxis are also available.

=== Railways ===
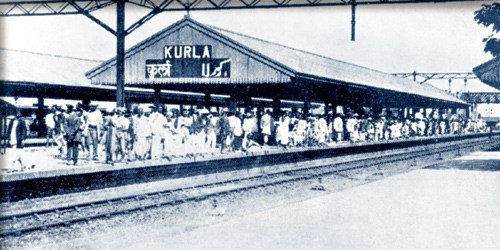
Kurla (coorla) station in 1925

Kurla railway station is a junction of the Central Railway Suburban line and the Harbour Line.

Lokmanya Tilak Terminus, formerly known as Kurla Terminus, is situated in the East. It was inaugurated in the 1980s and renovated in 2013. The Terminus handles several Central Railway Zone outstation trains every day.

=== Metro ===
Line 2B and Line 4 of Mumbai Metro will pass through Kurla.

Metro 2B is 23.643 km (14.691 mi) long and connects D.N. Nagar to Mankhurd. It will have stations at SG Barve Marg, Kurla (East) and Eastern Express Highway. A metro station for Kurla Terminus was originally proposed for Metro 2B but was cancelled in September 2020 because it was in the path of the restricted funnel zone for Mumbai Airport. Further, the proposed SG Barve Marg station was only 474 metres away from the proposed Kurla Terminus station. Another issue was that the Kurla Terminus station would have been located in between the Santa Cruz–Chembur Link Road (SCLR) rail overbridge and another permanent structure.

The 32-km long Wadala to Kasarvadavali Mumbai Metro Line 4 corridor will pass through Kurla East. The Siddharth Colony station will be the interchange station on Line 2B and Line 4. The stations on the two liners were originally designed around 480 metres apart. However, in May 2019, the MMRDA modified the designs and decided to merge both stations for the convenience of commuters.

== Entertainment ==
Phoenix Marketcity (Mumbai), one of Mumbai's largest malls, is situated on L.B.S. Marg, Kurla (West)

== Education ==
Kurla has one engineering college, Don Bosco Institute of Technology, and several schools, including:-.

- Al Barkaat Malik Muhammad Islam English School
- Holy Cross High School
- Michael High School, Kurla

== Notable people ==
- Iqbal Abdulla, Indian cricketer, playing in Royal Challengers Bangalore
- Shaikh Shamim Ahmed, MLA, Indian politician and Senior Congress leader
- Steven Dias, Indian football player (former resident)
- Erica Fernandes, model and actress
- Gurudas Kamat, politician and former member of parliament
- Navneet Kaur, actress (former resident) MP Amravati
- Kamran Khan, cricketer, former Pune Warriors player
- Sarfaraz Khan, Royal Challengers Bangalore
- Musheer Khan, cricketer, Mumbai & Punjab Kings player
- Nawab Malik, a former minister of Maharashtra, former MLA and a leader of the Nationalist Congress Party.
- Naezy, Rapper, Pioneer of Mumbai Hip-Hop scene.
- Candice Pinto, model and Miss Tourism International 2002
- Balwinder Sandhu, Indian Test cricketer

== Hospitals ==
=== Khan Bahadur Bhabha Hospital ===
The Khan Bahadur Bhabha Municipal General Hospital, on Belgrami Road, near Bharat Cinema, is one of Mumbai's 16 peripheral hospitals run by the Brihanmumbai Municipal Corporation. It has more than 300 beds and provides secondary-level referral health care services. The hospital started off in 1935 as a 30-bed maternity home called Khan Bahadur Hospital. An outpatient department (OPD) was added in 1950, converting it into a general hospital. Several other departments like surgery and pediatrics were added from 1962 on.

Additionally, 'L' Ward has 9 municipal dispensaries, 12 municipal health posts and 67 privately run nursing homes and hospitals.

Kohinoor Hospital was founded in 2005. Its 227,500 sq.ft, structure is the first LEED – Platinum rated Hospital in Asia. The hospital was acquired by CritiCare Asia Multispecialty Hospital and Research Center and was renamed CritiCare Asia Multispeciality Hospital Kurla in 2022. The hospital is equipped with 24X7 Trauma care, ICU, ICCU, NICU, MICU, state of the art Operation Theatre for minor, major, and supra major surgeries, pathology & diagnostic centre and stroke unit, nephrology and oncology center among others catering to all medical emergencies.

== Places of worship ==
- Holy Cross Church, Premier Road
