= Vidyavihar railway station =

Railway Station in Maharashtra, India

Vidyavihar
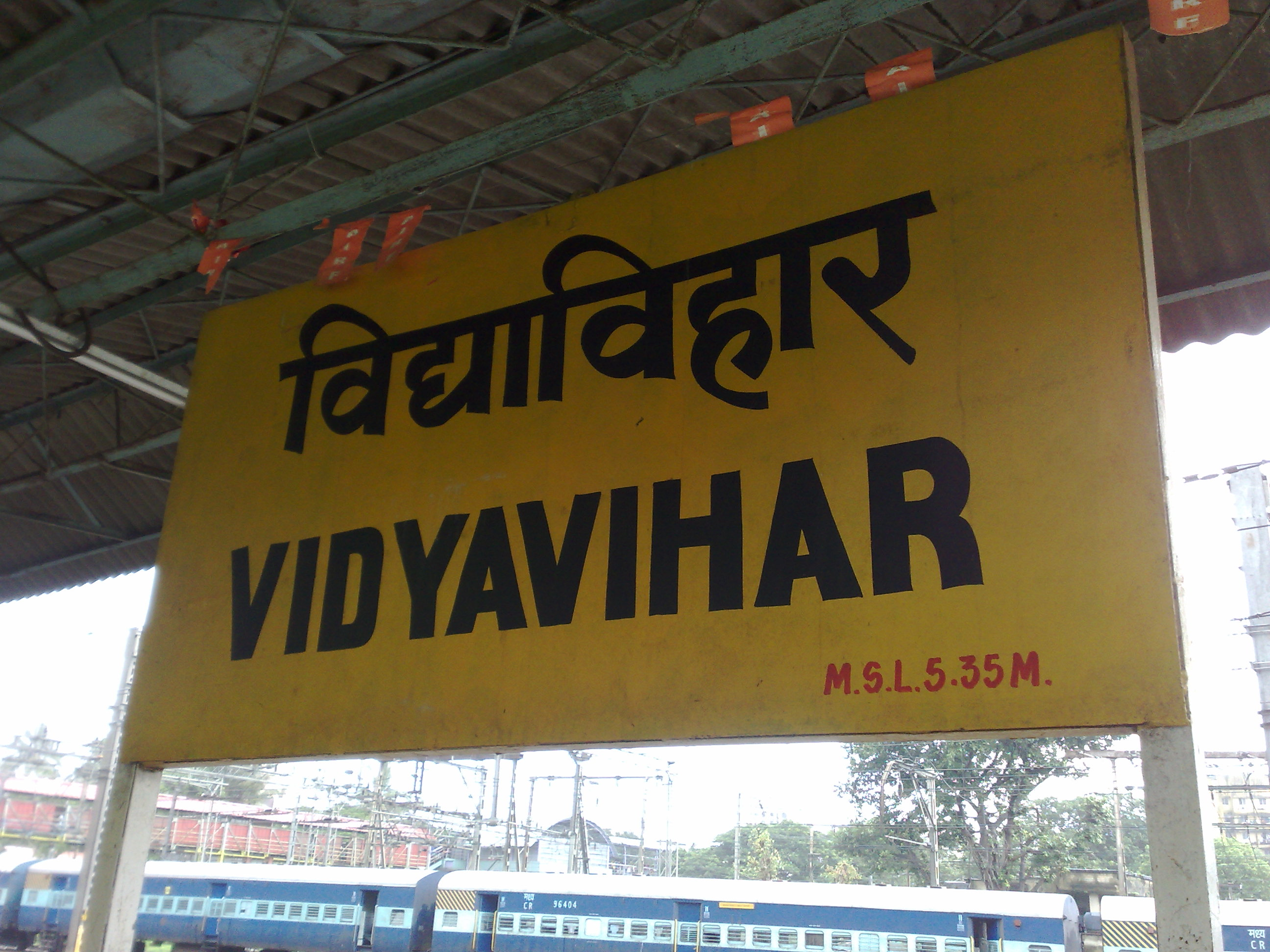

General information
- Coordinates: 19°4′46″N 72°53′50″E
- System: Indian Railways and Mumbai Suburban Railway station
- Owner: Ministry of Railways, Indian Railways
- Line: Central Line
- Platforms: 2

Construction
- Structure type: Standard on-ground station

Other information
- Status: Active
- Station code: VVH
- Fare zone: Central Railways

History
- Opened: 16 August 1961

Services
Preceding station	Mumbai Suburban Railway	Following station
Kurla towards Chhatrapati Shivaji Terminus	Central line	Ghatkopar towards Kasara or Khopoli
Route map
Location
- Location within India Location within Maharashtra Location within Mumbai

Vidyavihar, also spelled Vidya Vihar (station code: VVH), is a railway station on the Central Line of the Mumbai Suburban Railway network. It serves the Vidyavihar suburban area. It has two platforms and is generally busy during college hours. Vidyavihar falls between the stations Kurla and Ghatkopar.

== History ==
Vidyavihar station opened up in 1961, after the Great Indian Peninsular Railway (GIPR) was renamed to Central Railway. It is located in the vicinity of the Somaiya Vidyavihar from which it derives its name. A nursery, railway hostel and staff quarters were built in the 1960s and 1970s, flanking the station on both sides. However, they were soon razed down to make way for new tracks.
