= Kurla railway station =

Mumbai subway station, India

Kurla Coorla
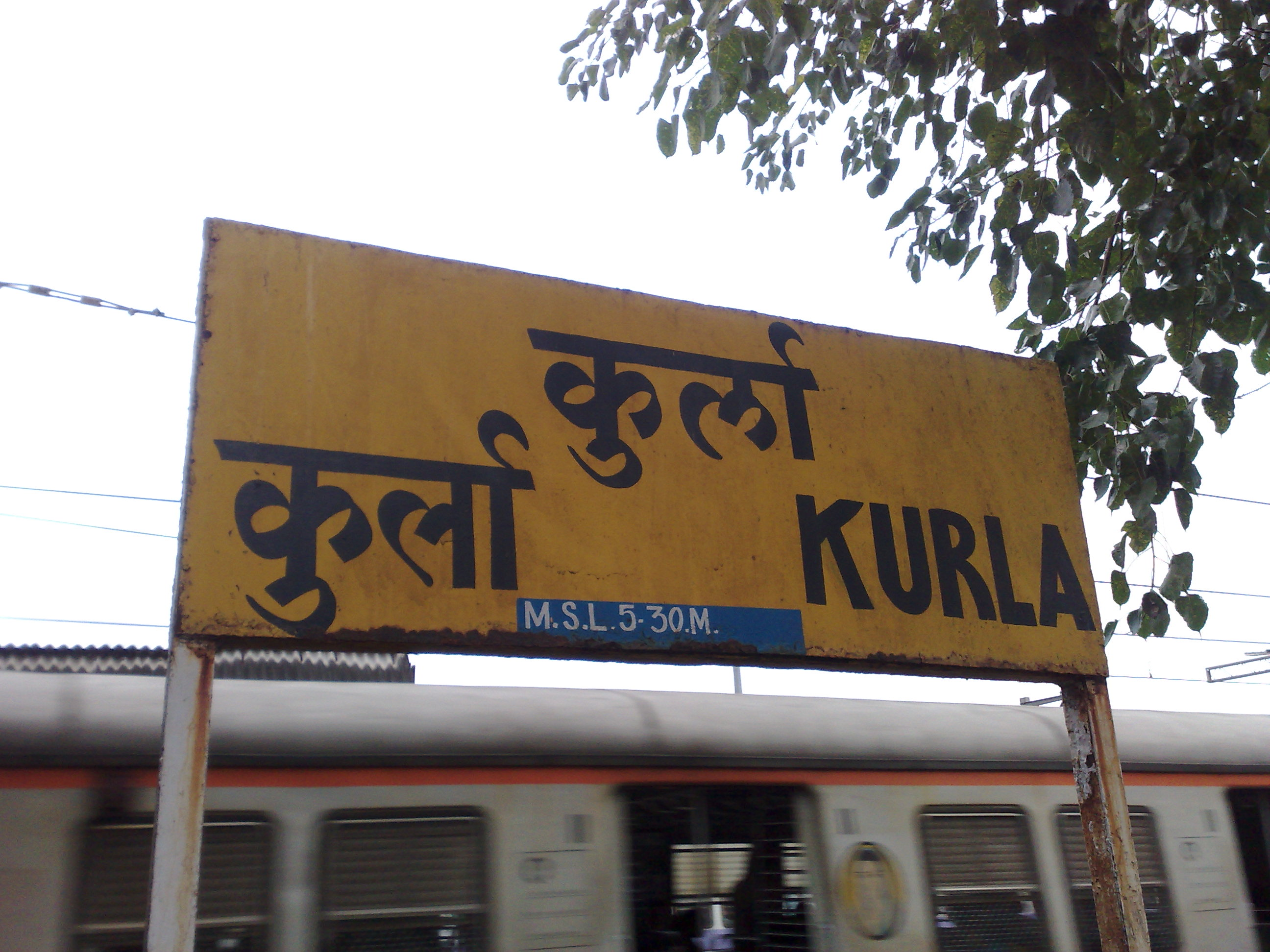

General information
- Coordinates: 19.0656°N 72.8791°E
- Elevation: 5.300 metres (17.39 ft)
- System: Indian Railways and Mumbai Suburban Railway station
- Owner: Ministry of Railways, Indian Railways
- Lines: Central Line, Harbour Line
- Platforms: 8
- Tracks: 10

Construction
- Structure type: Standard on-ground station

Other information
- Status: Active
- Station code: C (suburban); CLA (mainline)
- Fare zone: Central Railway zone

History
- Rebuilt: 1895
- Electrified: 1925
- Former names: Coorla
- Pre-nationalisation: Great Indian Peninsular Railway

Passengers
- 2012-13: 3,80,930

Services
| Preceding station | Mumbai Suburban Railway | Following station |
|---|---|---|
| Sion towards Chhatrapati Shivaji Terminus | Central line | Vidyavihar towards Kasara or Khopoli |
| Chunabhatti towards Chhatrapati Shivaji Terminus | Harbour line | Tilak Nagar towards Panvel |
Route map
Location
- Location within Mumbai

Kurla (formerly Coorla, station code: CLA) is a railway station on the Central and Harbour lines of the Mumbai Suburban Railway network. It is among the oldest railway stations in India, it being part of the original 21 mile (33.8 km) Great Indian Peninsula Railway (GIPR) section between Bombay (Mumbai) and Tannah (Thane) that opened in 1853.

== History ==
The original Bori Bunder-Tannah railway line had five stations on its main line, of which Sion station was the second stop (after Byculla). The original Sion station was renamed as Kurla in 1855. In 1895, the station was shifted to its present site, and it still retains its name as Kurla. (On the other hand, there was no Sion station again, until 1873.)

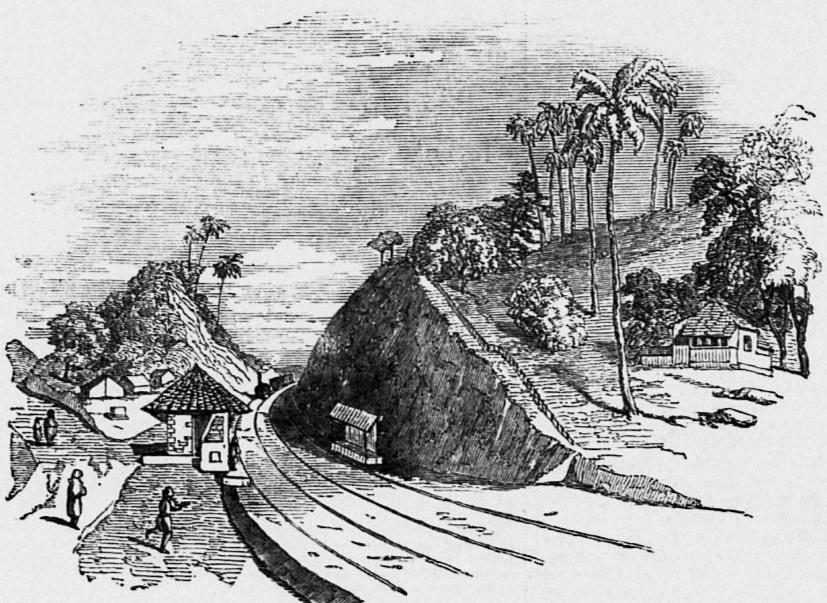
Old Kurla station (then named Sion) ,1853

The Old Kurla Station was situated opposite to the Sarveshwar Temple in Kurla. Construction of a new station began between 1893 and 1894, and the new station (at its present site) was opened in 1895. The Old station was subsequently closed.

Local trains terminating at Kurla began operating by 1879, a suburban terminus was built in 1913 and the line was quadrupled in 1915. The station was remodeled between March 1912 and March 1917. A single line between Kurla and Chembur that had been laid for garbage clearance in 1906 was opened for suburban traffic on 4 February 1924. The service was operated by steam locomotives until the line was electrified in 1950.

The Harbour line was officially opened on 12 December 1910, between Kurla and Reay Road. It was named so because it catered to the eastern neighbourhoods along the city's natural harbour. In 1925, the line was connected to the then Victoria Terminus via an elevated rail corridor between Dockyard Road and Sandhurst Road. The country's first EMU rakes, manufactured by the English Electric Company, were introduced between Bombay VT & Kurla on the Harbour line in 1925.

== Platforms ==
Kurla is having eight operational platforms for the suburban local railway. Platform 1, 1A and 4 serve 'Slow' local trains. Platform 1A formerly served the Salsette–Trombay Railway. Platforms 2 and 3 are dedicated to trains originating and terminating at Kurla. Platforms 5 and 6 are used by 'Fast' local trains, while platforms 7 and 8 serve the Harbour line local trains. Platforms 9 and 10, which were originally used to terminate trains coming Up from Vashi were abandoned in the early 2000s. Prior to the opening of the railway line to Navi Mumbai, these two platforms were used by shuttle trains till Mankhurd.

== Gallery ==
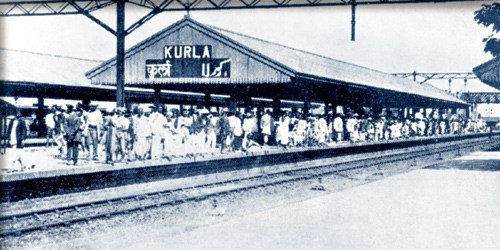
Kurla station in 1925

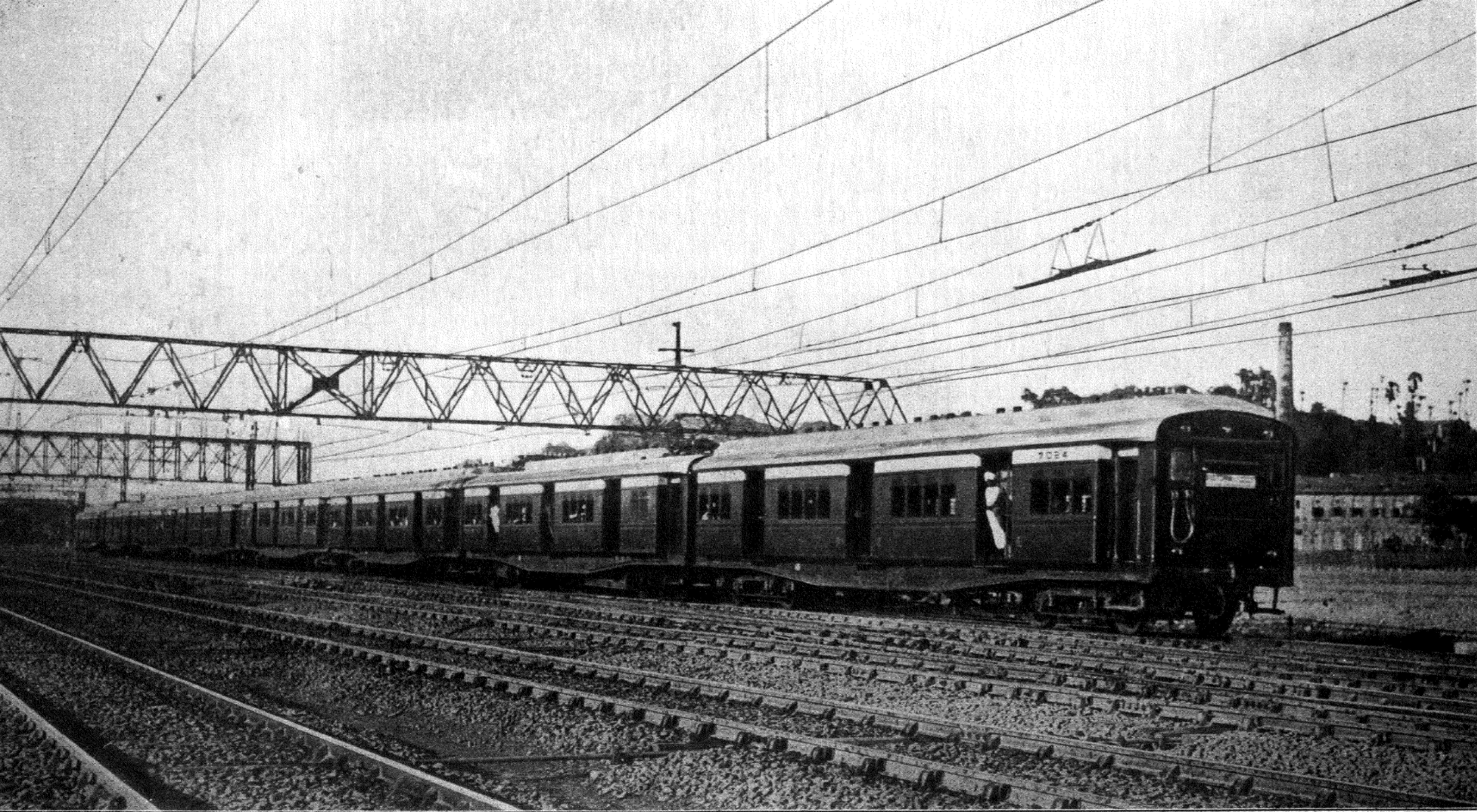
View of Eight Coach Electric Train approaching Kurla, Mumbai, Maharashtra, India.

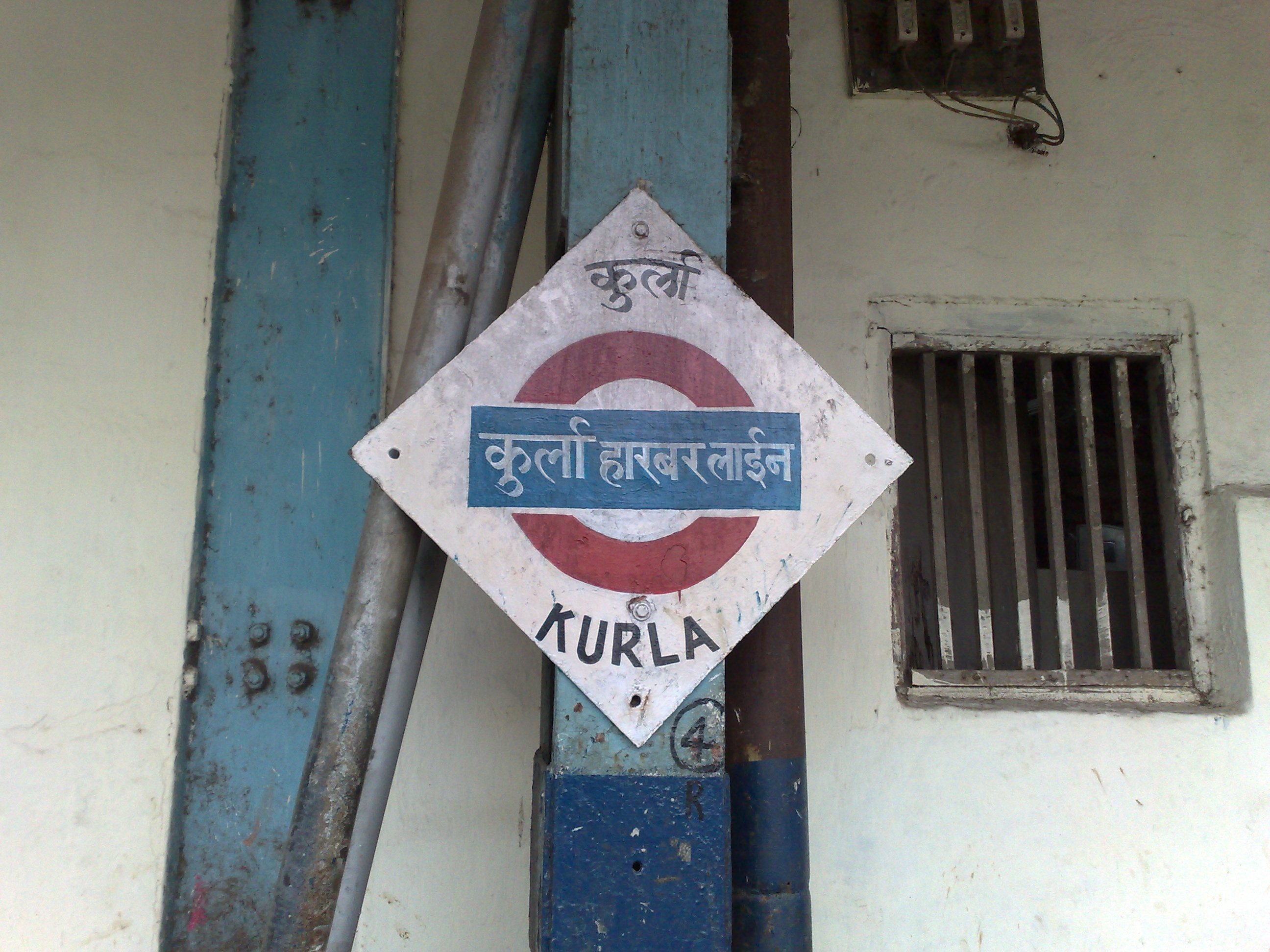
Kurla Harbour Line platform board

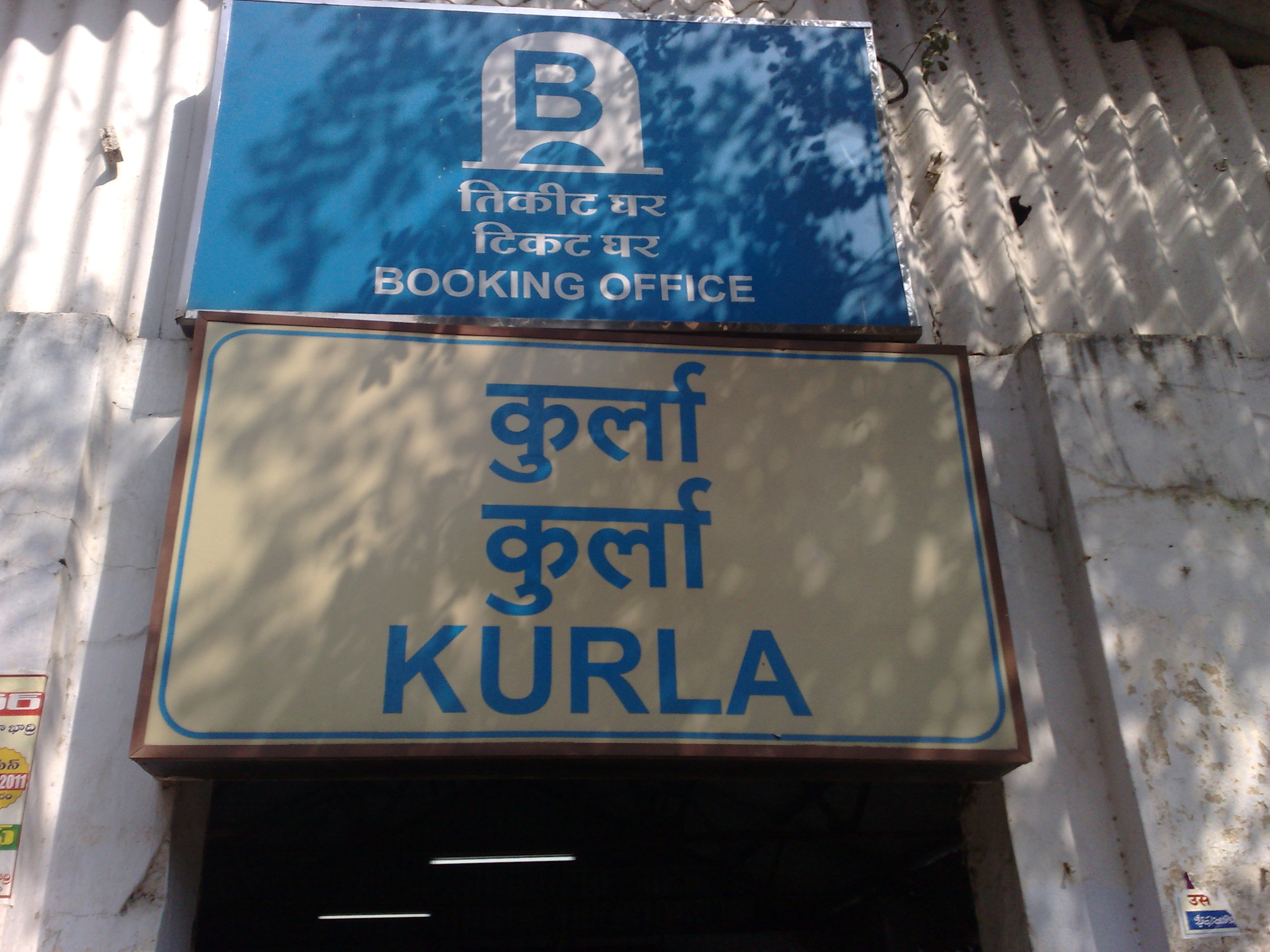
Kurla Station booking office
