= Eastern Suburbs (Mumbai) =

East Mumbai
- suburb
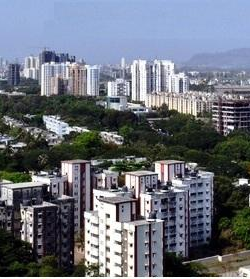
- View of Kanjur Marg looking South West

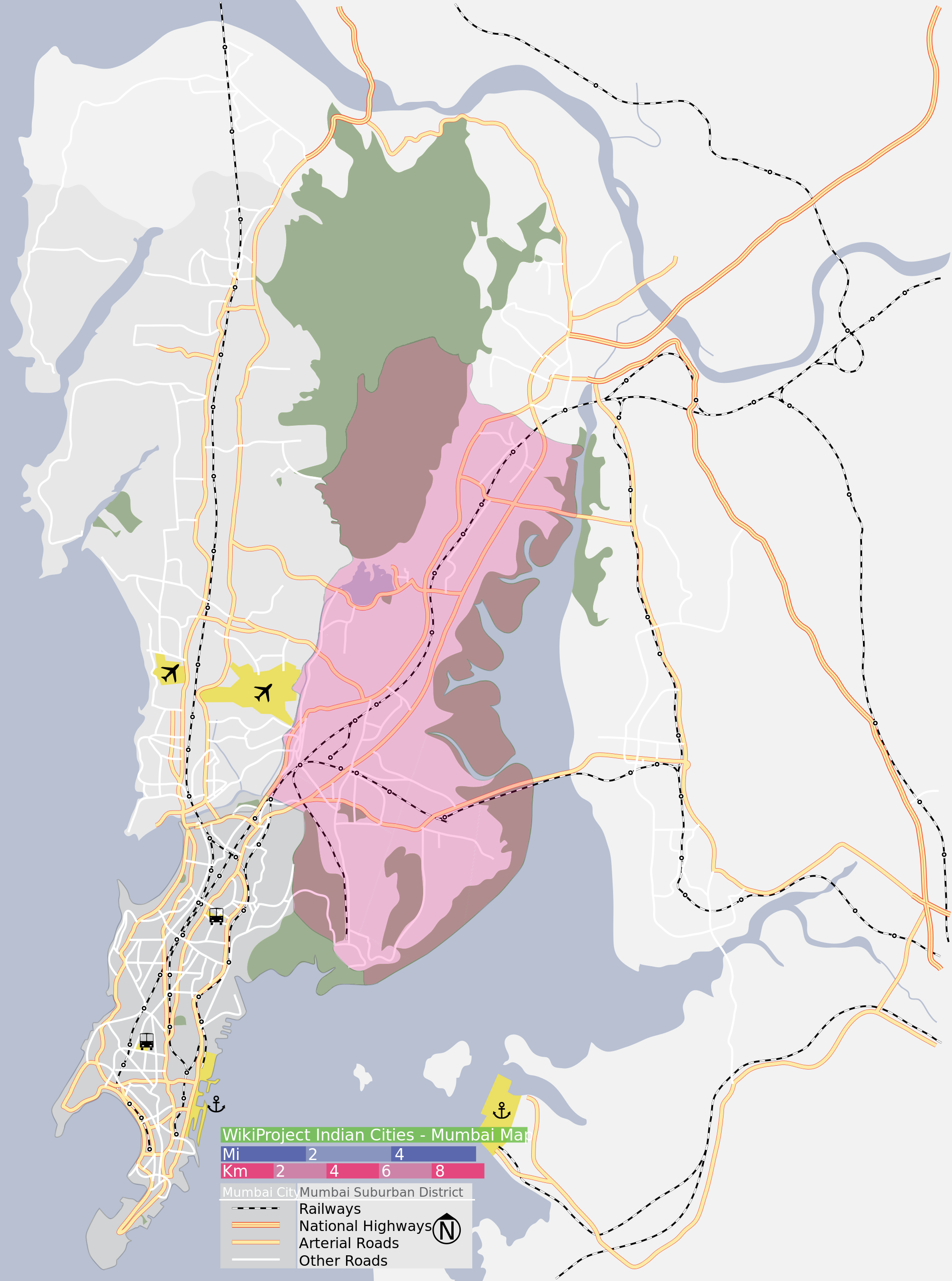
- Eastern Suburbs precinct is shown in pink

- Mumbai Eastern Suburbs Mumbai Eastern Suburbs (Maharashtra) Mumbai Eastern Suburbs (Mumbai)
- Coordinates (Kanjurmarg): 19.13°N 72.94°E
- Country: India
- State: Maharashtra
- City: Mumbai
- Wards: L, ME, MW, N, S, T

Area
  - Total: 203.3 km^{2} (78.5 sq mi)

Population (2011)
  - Total: 4,160,000
  - Density: 20,500/km^{2} (53,000/sq mi)
- Time zone: UTC+5:30 (IST)

Eastern Suburbs: Population Growth
Year	Pop.	±%
1971	1,194,710	—
1981	2,100,220	+75.8%
1991	2,803,030	+33.5%
2001	3,491,890	+24.6%
Source: MMRDA; Data is based on Government of India Census.

East Mumbai consists the localities of Kurla, Vidyavihar, Ghatkopar, Kanjur Marg, Bhandup, Mulund, Nahur, Powai and Vikhroli. To the south-east lie the neighborhoods of Chembur, Tilak Nagar, Govandi, Mankhurd, and Trombay.

== Division ==
The city of Mumbai lies on Salsette Island. The long thinner protruding landmass just across the Mithi River is the oldest part of the city. This region is called South Mumbai/South Bombay(SoBo) or Town side. The area just north of Mithi river is called Western Suburbs of Mumbai and the area that lies to the east of the airport is called Eastern Suburbs of Mumbai. North Mumbai(North Bombay) is further upwards just across the JVLR that stretches from Bhayander to Jogeshwari in the Western Suburbs and Thane to Vikhroli in the Eastern Suburbs, is primarily the residential part of the city.

== Transport ==
=== Rail ===
Eastern Suburbs of Mumbai are served by the Central Line. With the exception of Powai, each of the neighborhoods has a railway station. Kurla is an interchange point for the Harbour Line.

=== Road ===
The Eastern Express Highway (EEH) is a major road that runs along the border of the Eastern Suburbs of Mumbai.

Lal Bahadur Shastri Marg (LBS Marg) is a 21 km long, major arterial road in the Eastern Suburbs. LBS Marg starts from Thane all the way till Sion in Mumbai.

However, connectivity from the Western part of the city is poor. The Andheri-Ghatkopar Link Road, Jogeshwari - Vikhroli Link Road (JVLR), and the Andheri-Kurla Road are the major road links between the Eastern and Western neighbourhoods. Santa Cruz – Chembur Link Road (SCLR), which was completed in April 2014, links Santa Cruz to Chembur.

Bus services are provided by Brihanmumbai Electric Supply and Transport (BEST). There are bus depots at Ghatkopar, Mulund, and Vikhroli.

== See also ==
- Central Line
- Western Line
- Harbour Line
- Mira-Bhayandar
- South Mumbai
- Western Suburbs (Mumbai)

== Notes ==
- "Population and Employment profile of Mumbai Metropolitan Region" (PDF). Mumbai Metropolitan Region Development Authority (MMRDA). Archived from the original (PDF) on 13 June 2010.
