= Mumbai Urban Transport Project =

Ongoing infrastructure program in Maharashtra

The Mumbai Urban Transport Project (MUTP), is a project formulated by the Mumbai Metropolitan Region Development Authority (MMRDA) to bring about improvement in the traffic and transport situation in the Mumbai metropolitan region with the assistance of the World Bank.

== Background Information ==
The parties involved in the project include:

- Government of Maharashtra
- Mumbai Railway Vikas Corporation (MRVC)
- Indian Railways (IR)
- Mumbai Metropolitan Region Development Authority (MMRDA)
- Brihanmumbai Municipal Corporation (BMC)
- Brihanmumbai Electric Supply and Transport (BEST)
- World Bank

== Phase I ==
Phase I began in 2002 and was completed in 2011. The total estimated cost of the MUTP Phase I was ₹4,526 crore (US$530 million). Most of the money was spent on railway projects, while less than a fourth was spent on road projects.

The following projects were proposed to be implemented under MUTP:

Road transport

- Widening and improvement of the Jogeshwari - Vikhroli Link Road
- Santa Cruz – Chembur Link Road (including an ROB at Kurla)
- ROB at Jogeshwari (South)
- ROB at Jogeshwari (North)
- ROB at Vikhroli
- Purchase of 644 eco friendly buses
- Pedestrian Grade Separation Schemes
- Area Traffic Control System in the Island City
- Station Area Traffic Improvement Schemes (SATIS) at 6 stations
- Other traffic management and safety schemes including footpaths
- Environment - Air quality monitoring
- Different studies and technical assistance

Rail transport

- 5th line on Western Railway between Mahim and Borivali
- 5th and 6th lines between Kurla and Thane
- Borivli-Bhayandar additional pair of lines (including Virar car shed and Virar - Dahanu road track centre work)
- Optimisation on Western Railway
- Optimisation on Central Railway
- Optimisation on Harbour line
- DC/AC conversion
- Procurement of new EMUs (trains)
- EMU maintenance facilities
- Stabling lines
- Track machines
- Technical assistance and studies - setting up of MRVC
- PPF reimbursement

The road projects included in MUTP were the Santa Cruz – Chembur Link Road (SCLR) and the Jogeshwari - Vikhroli Link Road (JVLR).

Railway Minister Dinesh Trivedi announced in 2012 that Phase I was completed.

== Phase II ==
The projects proposed under MUTP–II were:

Project	Sanctioned cost (₹crore)	Revised cost (₹crore)
CST-Kurla, 5th and 6th track	659	923.78
Mumbai Central-Borivali, 6th track	522	1049.91
Thane–Diva, 5th and 6th track	133	287.62
Extension of Harbor Line to Goregaon	103	147.60
1500 V DC to 25000 V AC power conversion	293	739.91
EMU train procurement	2930	3041.13
Maintenance facilities for EMU trains	205	323.67
Stabling lines for EMUs	141	178.91
Technical assistance	62	62
Resettlement and rehabilitation of PAPs	124	124
Station improvement and trespassing control	128	128
Total	5300	7006.53

== Phase III ==
Phase III of the Mumbai Urban Transport Project was approved on 8 December 2011. It will cost ₹52,000 crore (US$6.1 billion). The feasibility study for the project cost ₹100 million (US$1.2 million). The project includes a fast corridor from Chhatrapati Shivaji Terminus to Panvel with a connection to the proposed new Navi Mumbai International Airport, extending the Harbour Line to Borivali, and multiple additional tracks being laid on existing routes. The project is scheduled for completion in 2031.

=== Phase 3A ===
The Union Cabinet approved Phase 3A of the MUTP on 7 March 2019. It will cost ₹33,690 crore (US$3.9 billion) shared equally by the Union and State Governments, and is scheduled to be completed within 5 years. Projects approved under Phase 3A include:

- Procurement of 191 air-conditioned rakes
- Extension of the Harbour Line from Goregaon up to Borivali
- Segregation of suburban and long-distance traffic at Kalyan Yard
- Implementing a Communications Based Train Control System
- Revamping 19 railway stations
- Additional capacity of existing lines
  - 5th and 6th lines between Borivali and Virar
  - 4th line between Kalyan and Asangaon
  - 3rd and 4th lines between Kalyan and Badlapur.

=== Phase 3B ===
It is under Consideration by MRVC in the view of "Third Mumbai".

1) Panvel - Vasai new suburban corridor

2) Asangaon - Kasara 4th line

3) Badlapur - Karjat 3rd & 4th lines
