= Amrut Nagar =

Amrut Nagar अमृत नगर
- Neighbourhood
- Location in Mumbai, India
- Coordinates: 19.102077°N 72.912835°E
- Country: India
- State: Maharashtra
- District: Mumbai Suburban
- City: Mumbai
- Suburb: Ghatkopar

Government
  - Type: Municipal Corporation
  - Body: Brihanmumbai Municipal Corporation (MCGM)
- Time zone: UTC+5:30 (IST)
- Pincode: 400 086
- Area code: 022
- Civic agency: BMC

Amrut Nagar is a neighbourhood in Ghatkopar, a suburb of Mumbai in India. Amrut Nagar borders Ghatkopar (West), and is adjacent to Parksite, Vikhroli. It has the pincode 400086.

Amrut Nagar is located in the foothills of the Sahyadri range. Historically an open area with low building density, the region has since undergone urban development.

== Housing and industry ==
Dev Shetty was the first colony formed in Amrut Nagar, and in 1965, Shashi Niwas was the first building formed in that colony. During that period the area was undeveloped and was a rocky and barren area. Then, in the late 70's and early 80's slowly & gradually the area developed. Then Amrut Nagar had 4 housing colonies, employees of Mazagon Dock Limited had formed a co-operative and established 3 buildings (Shraddha, Shankul, Mazagon Dock Officers CHS, all owned by residents) in a nice cul-de-sac. The employees of Ciba-Geigy had established their own colony and right opposite to them was the colony of Vasant Villa. There was only the ONGC (Oil and Natural Gas Corporation, an Indian Government undertaking) quarters, which were not owned, but rather provided to the employees of ONGC by the Government.

The Nikita Natasha building complex was then built across from the buildings owned by the employees of Mazagon Docks, then Aarti Aashish was built across the street from the ONGC quarters. Chhotalal Villa, Bhagirathi Villa and associated buildings were built down the street from ONGC and then Sagar Park apartment complex and Shrenik Nagar Co-operative Housing Society were built opposite to Amrut Nagar circle.The Shrenik Nagar Co-operative Housing Society has a Shwetamber Jain temple.The Sheth Enclave Cooperative Housing Society Limited in Amrut Nagar has the most expensive apartments in the area ranging from 2 to 2.5 Crore Indian Rupees(approx. 229,097 US Dollars). Nikita Natasha is the largest building complex in Amrut Nagar. The Ghatkopar Industrial Area is located on Amrut Nagar Road.

== Schools ==
There were a few good schools nearby, North Bombay Welfare Society High School (NBWS), located at rifle Range, about a kilometer away and at walking distance, Fatima High School, located at Vidyavihar. Students needed to use school buses to travel to these 2 schools. There were a few municipal schools and Little Flower English High School and Meera's Academy also located in the area. For any international schooling people can opt for schools located in Powai Hiranandani.

== Transportation ==
Initially the only bus service to Amrut Nagar from Ghatkopar station was from Route #387, the final stop of which was at Vikhroli Parksite, located at about 1 kilometer from Amrut Nagar. As Amrut Nagar grew, the first bus service to Amrut Nagar was Bus Route #400. BEST (Brihan Mumbai Electric supply and transportation) set up their quarters down the street from Sagar park. The bus service was improved significantly since then, with #416 replacing #400 and #410 to Andheri (Mahakali Caves).Other two bus routes are #380 which goes to Trombay and #603 which goes to Vikhroli Station, Kanjurmarg and Bhandup. With the existing metro line which helps commuters to travel in the western suburbs easily, Amrut Nagar is now even getting ready with the new Metro Line for which the work is in progress on the LBS road.

The local bus depot is about a 15-minute walk in Bomkhana, Vikhroli.

There are also auto rickshaws available for public from amrut nagar to ghatkopar station.

== Roads ==
The Amrut Nagar Road connects LBS Marg with Amrut Nagar. It begins at the signal near R City Mall, and ends at the Amrut Nagar Circle. The Circle has 3 other roads to its left, right and straight ahead. The road to the left, leads towards the Vikhroli - Powai road owned by Hiranandani, and was named Celine D'Silva Marg on 4 May 2013, in a ceremony attended by Maharashtra Chief Minister Prithviraj Chavan. The road to the left is a dead end and going straight from the circle leads to the neighbourhood of Jagdusha Nagar and eventually rejoins LBS Marg at the junction near Nityanand Nagar.

== Shopping and town life ==
Amrut Nagar was a small, sleepy community in the 1980s. Today, it's a bustling community with several shops, grocery stores, beauty parlors, gymnasiums, restaurants etc.

Like the most of Mumbai, Amrut Nagar also has street vendors selling sweets in 2 locations (near Bhagirathi Villa and near ONGC Quarters). Street vendors also have stalls for fresh seasonal fruits, roasted corn, different types of ices, Chinese food, local delicacies, juice etc.

R City Mall is in close proximity to Amrut Nagar. The mall is considered to be one of the popular malls in Mumbai.
