= Western Suburbs (Mumbai) =

- Precinct of Greater Mumbai
- Gokuldham in Goregaon (East)

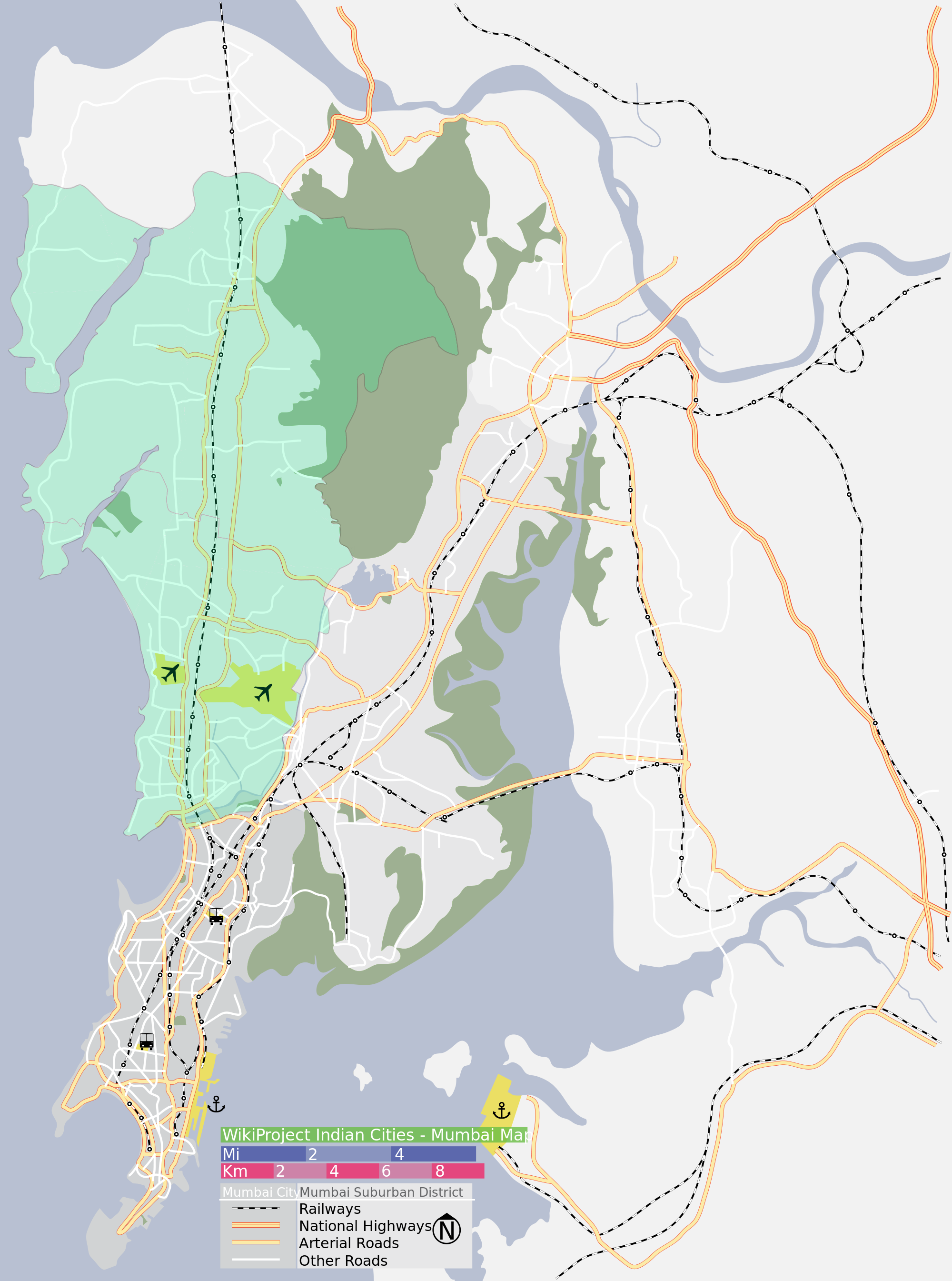
- Western Suburbs precinct is shown in green

- Mumbai Western Suburbs Mumbai Western Suburbs (Maharashtra) Mumbai Western Suburbs (Mumbai)
- Coordinates (Vile Parle): 19.10°N 72.83°E
- Country: India
- State: Maharashtra
- District: Mumbai Suburban
- Metro: Mumbai
- Wards: HE, HW, KE, KW, PS, PN, RS, RC, RN

Area
  - Total: 242.7 km^{2} (93.7 sq mi)

Population (2011)
  - Total: 6,220,000
  - Density: 25,600/km^{2} (66,400/sq mi)
- Time zone: UTC+5:30 (IST)

Western Suburbs: Population Growth
Year	Pop.	±%
1971	1,705,490	—
1981	2,858,170	+67.6%
1991	3,947,990	+38.1%
2001	5,095,680	+29.1%
Source: MMRDA; Data is based on Government of India Census.

The Western Suburbs are the western precinct of the city of Mumbai, India. The Western Suburbs consist of Andheri, Bandra, Marol, Oshiwara, Lokhandwala, Borivali, Dahisar, Goregaon, Versova, Jogeshwari, Juhu, Kandivali, Khar, Malad, Saki Naka, Santacruz, and Vile Parle. Geographically, the Western Suburbs lie at the western part of Salsette Island, and are a continuous urban sprawl spanning the areas from Bandra to Bhayander, which is separated by the Vasai Creek from the Vasai-Virar city and the Mithi River from Mumbai city district (Churchgate to Mahim).

The Western Suburbs are some of the oldest suburbs of the city. In particular, Bandra has existed as a separate town almost as long as Mumbai. The area started its history as a series of fishing villages. River Mithi flows through this area and also serves as a sewage line. In the 1980s, a well-intentioned attempt to set up a new downtown away from Nariman Point resulted in the establishment of the Bandra Kurla Complex. Most of the larger financial banks and companies moved to this place.

Apart from the usual suburban sprawl, this area has some nice beaches, especially near Malad. Jogeshwari has hot springs, which are reputed to have medicinal properties. Borivali is the entry point for the Sanjay Gandhi National Park, which is why the wildlife reserve is more popularly known as the Borivali National Park.

Many software and BPO companies have their offices in and around SEEPZ in Andheri. The western suburbs also have the Juhu Beach. These suburbs can get extremely crowded in the evenings, with very severe traffic jams.

== Division ==
The city of Mumbai lies on Salsette Island. Administratively, it has two official divisions: Mumbai City district and Mumbai Suburban district. Mumbai City district consists of the island city that lies to the south of Salsette Island. This region is called South Mumbai. The western part of Mumbai Suburban district (to the west of Sanjay Gandhi National Park) is called the Western Suburbs and the eastern part of the district is called the Eastern Suburbs.

The northernmost portion of the island, which is outside the Mumbai city limits, lies in Thane District.

South Mumbai, the Western Suburbs and the Eastern Suburbs, are not officially defined divisions of Mumbai, and different people may include different areas in each division. This article uses the most popular divisions.

== Transport ==
=== Air ===
Chhatrapati Shivaji International Airport is located in Andheri. Most 5-star hotels are located nearby. The Juhu Aerodrome, which is used by small private aircraft and also as a heliport, is located in Juhu.

=== Rail ===
Each of the suburbs has a railway station on the Western and the Harbour line of the city's suburban railway system. Bandra, Andheri, Borivali, and Bhayander are important railway stations. A branch of the Harbour line terminates at Goregaon, with further extension up to Borivali-Bhayander in the planning stage. Bandra Terminus is one of the six terminals for long-distance trains in Mumbai. Line 1 of the Mumbai Metro also spans the entire suburb of Andheri.

=== Road ===
The Western Express Highway (WEH) connects Bhayander-Mira Road-Dahisar-Borivali belt, the northernmost suburb of the Western Suburbs, to Vile Parle-Bandra belt and then Worli and South Mumbai via the Bandra–Worli Sea Link. WEH runs parallel to the Western Line, which is on its western side.

SV Road (Swami Vivekananda Road) is another major road in the Western Suburbs, it begins in Bandra in the south and ends at the Dahisar Flyover junction with the Western Express Highway in the north.

However, connectivity from the Eastern Suburbs is poor. The Andheri-Ghatkopar Link Road, Jogeshwari – Vikhroli Link Road (JVLR), the Andheri-Kurla Road and the Santa Cruz – Chembur Link Road (SCLR) are the major road links between the Eastern and Western Suburbs.

Bus services are provided by Brihanmumbai Electric Supply and Transport (BEST). The "200" & "300" series buses serves the Western Suburbs.

== See also ==
- Central Line (Mumbai Suburban Railway)
- Mira-Bhayandar
- Eastern Suburbs (Mumbai)
- South Mumbai

== Notes ==
- "Population and Employment profile of Mumbai Metropolitan Region" (PDF). Mumbai Metropolitan Region Development Authority (MMRDA). Archived from the original (PDF) on 13 June 2010.
