= Western Express Highway =

Motorway in Mumbai

Western Express Highway Ali Yavar Jung Marg पश्चिम द्रुतगती महामार्ग
- Western Express Highway marked in Red on Mumbai area map
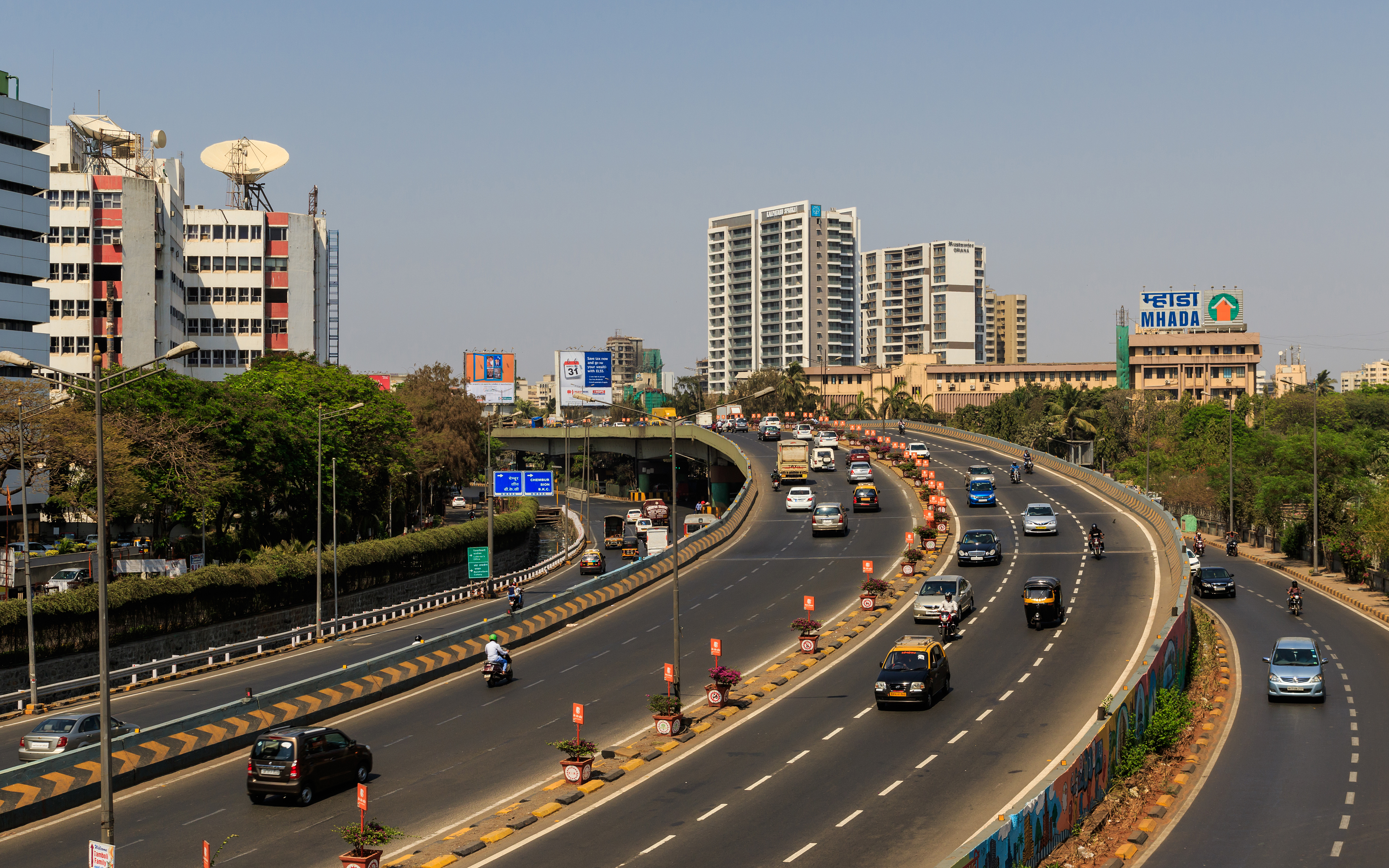
- Western Express Highway at Bandra

Route information
- Maintained by MMRDA, MSRDC
- Length: 25.33 km (15.74 mi)

Major junctions
- North end: NH48 in Mira Road
- Veer Savarkar Road and General AK Vaidya Marg in Goregaon; JVLR in Jogeshwari; SCLR in Santacruz; Andheri-Kurla Road in Andheri; Sahar Road in Andheri; SEAR in Vile Parle; SV Road in Bandra
- South end: Bandra–Worli Sea Link

Location
- Country: India
- States: Maharashtra
- Districts: Mumbai Suburban
- Major cities: Mumbai

Highway system
- Roads in India; Expressways; National; State; Asian

The Western Express Highway, abbreviated to WEH (officially Ali Yavar Jung Marg, after the former Governor of Maharashtra), is a major north–south 8-10 lane arterial road in Mumbai, India, stretching from the suburb of Mira Road to Bandra. The 25.33 km (15.74 mi) highway begins near the Mahim Creek and extends to the Kashimira, in the northern limit of the city, till it connects to the National Highway 48 at Ghodbunder village. The road connects the city of Mumbai to its suburbs, including the Chhatrapati Shivaji Maharaj International Airport.

== Background ==
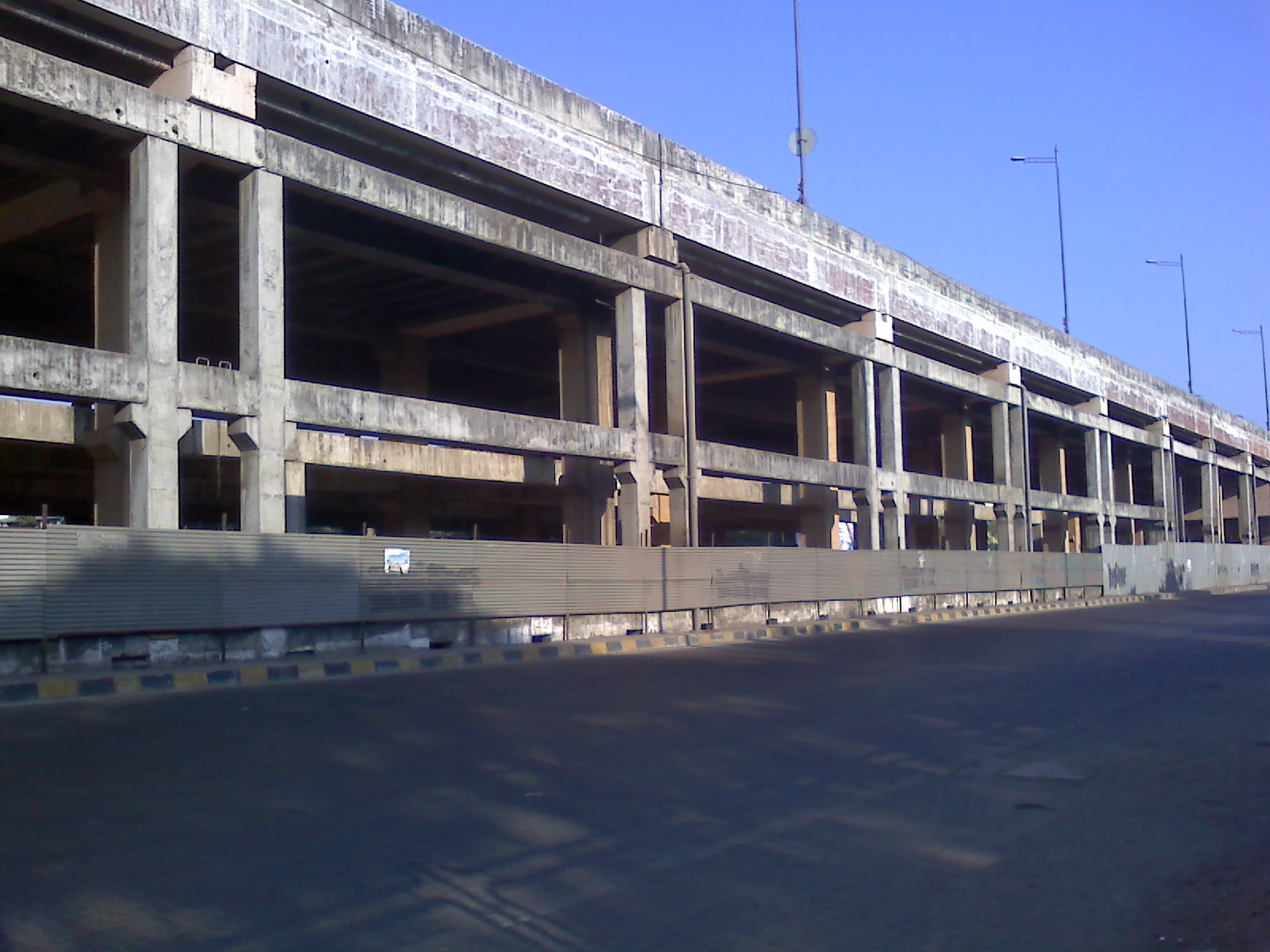
Andheri Flyover

This highway has been instrumental in reducing congestion on the SV Road in the western part of the city. There are several flyovers built along sections of the Western Express Highway. The Andheri Flyover (opened in 2002) was one of the flyovers built over the Western Express Highway to avoid traffic lights for vehicles moving towards Vile Parle, Bandra, and so on. Recently, another project has been undertaken by the MSRDC to construct a flyover bridge from Vile Parle onwards to avoid regular traffic jams that occur on the Highway. Other flyovers on the highway are the National Park, Dindoshi, Thakur Complex, Times of India, Pathanwadi, Goregaon, JVLR, Centaur, Vakola, and the newly opened Kherwadi flyovers. Motorists can now travel with no traffic signals from Dahisar till Bandra. New reflectors are installed on the Express Highway for better visibility of the road during the night. Signs showing directions have also been set up at major junctions of the highway. Over the past decade, there have been major improvements, including installation of better signage, improvements to landscaping, and the introduction of marked lanes, painted kerbsides, and pedestrian bridges.

The airport flyover, also known as Sahar Elevated Access Road, connects to the WEH using tunnels and bridges. The airport flyover was finished in 2014, and motorists on the WEH are able to access the new terminal with ease. The other alternative to the SEAR is to turn east on to local streets which are relatively narrow, have poor lighting and have lower speed limits. The statue of Chhatrapati Shivaji Maharaja is placed near the entrance of the SEAR; previously, this statue was located at the international terminal of the airport.

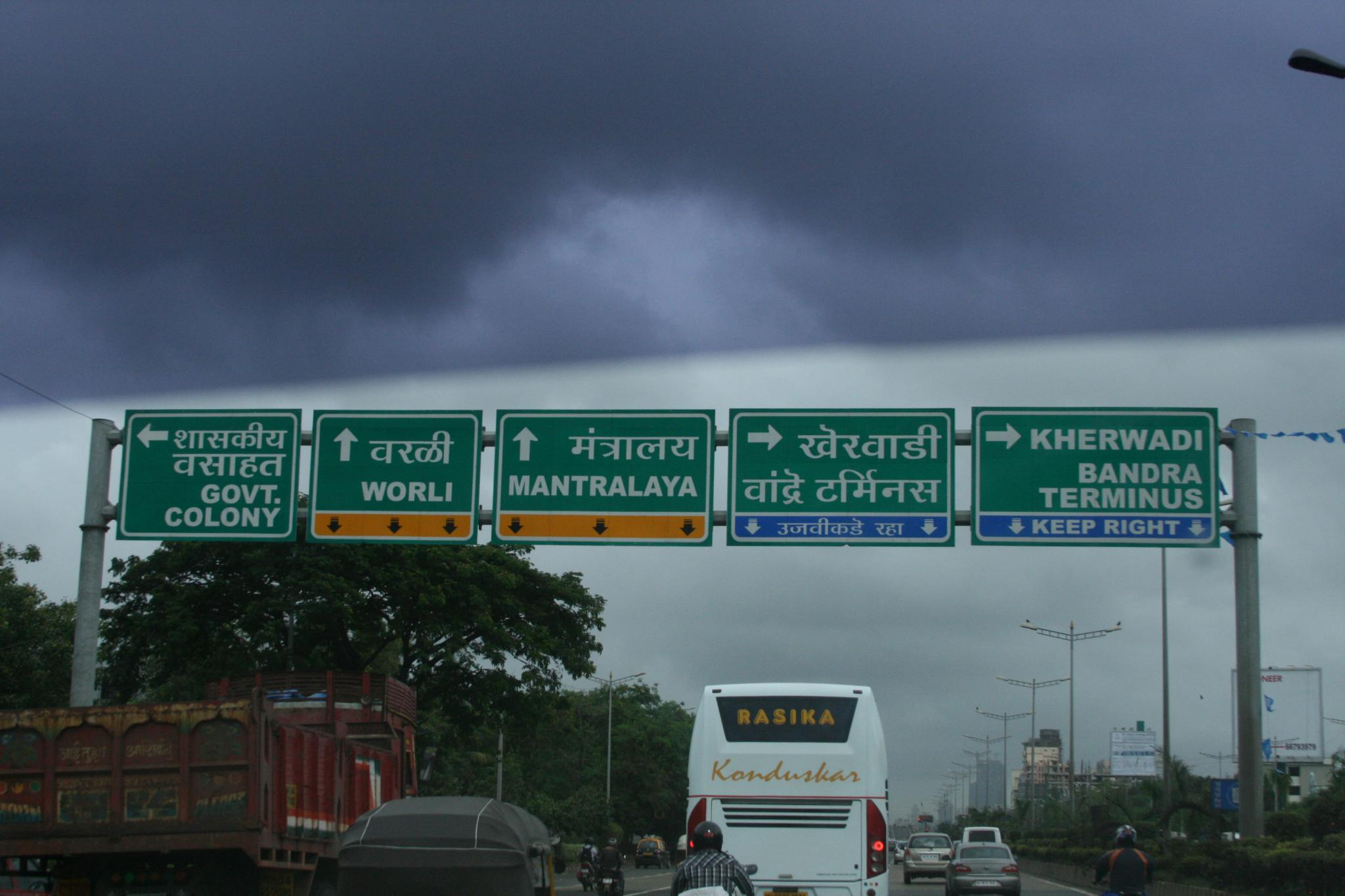
Signage on Western Express Highway

Link roads connecting WEH and EEH, such as the Jogeshwari – Vikhroli Link Road (JVLR) and Santa Cruz – Chembur Link Road (SCLR), are the major arterial roads of the Mumbai suburban road network. Both the WEH and the EEH run along north-to-south direction and are parallel in certain sections.

== Parallel Rail links ==
The highway largely parallels the Western line of the Mumbai Suburban Railway.

As part of the Mumbai Metro master plan, the Red Line which is operational from April 2022 and Line 9 (Mumbai Metro) its extension which is being constructed on the Western Express Highway from Bhayander to Dahisar East to Mumbai T2 Airport. It will have six interchanges with the Yellow, Aqua, Green, Gold and Red line extensions of the Mumbai Metro.

== See also ==
- Eastern Express Highway
- SEAR
