= Jogeshwari–Vikhroli Link Road =

Road in Mumbai, India

Jogeshwari–Vikhroli Link Road (JVLR)
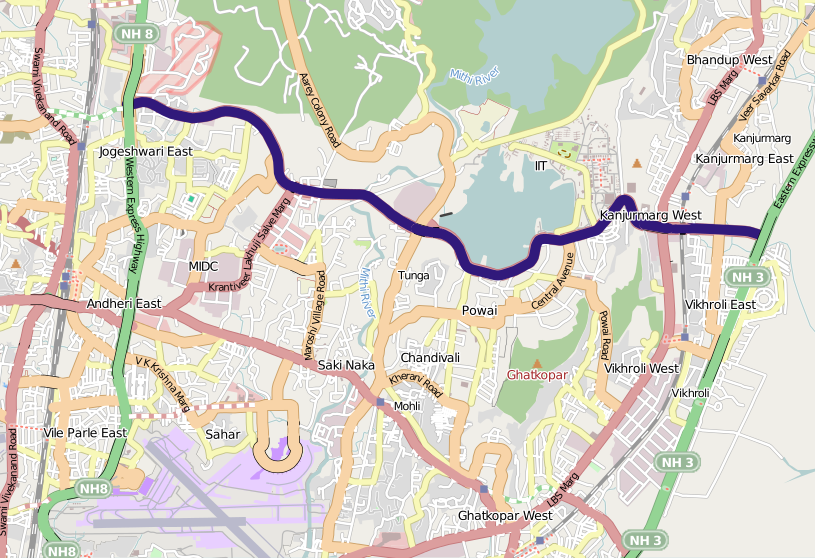
- The JVLR (in purple) linking the Western and Eastern Express Highways (in green).

Route information
- Maintained by Brihanmumbai Municipal Corporation
- Length: 10.6 km (6.6 mi)
- Existed: 1994–present

Major junctions
- West end: Western Express Highway, Jogeshwari
- MIDC Central Road in SEEPZ, Saki Vihar Road in Powai; LBS Marg in Gandhi Nagar, Vikhroli
- East end: Eastern Express Highway, Vikhroli

Location
- Country: India
- States: Maharashtra
- Districts: Mumbai Suburban
- Major cities: Mumbai

Highway system
- Roads in India; Expressways; National; State; Asian

The Jogeshwari–Vikhroli Link Road (JVLR), is a 10.6-kilometre-long (6.6 mi), 6-lane road with a central median in Mumbai, which connects the Western Express Highway and the Eastern Express Highway providing speedier access from Jogeshwari in the Western Suburbs to Vikhroli in the Eastern Suburbs. It was opened to traffic in 1994 and widened from two to six lanes in 2012 at a cost of ₹221.45 crore (equivalent to ₹417 crore or US$43 million in 2023). The under-construction Line 6 of the Mumbai Metro is being constructed on this link road.

L&T flyover (Magnetic flyover) on this road has a gravity hill effect, where vehicles seem to defy gravity with the optical illusion of rolling up the slope.

== Route description ==
The corridor of land adjacent to JVLR on either side is being put to extensive and varied use. As the link road is developing into a major network connecting EEH and WEH, the land use pattern along the corridor has undergone a rapid change since it was opened to traffic in 1994. Open and barren wasteland space available in the western and middle sections of JVLR, and the marshy land area in the eastern section of JVLR, have been converted to residential, commercial, and industrial land use patterns, albeit gradually. The entire 10.6 km long JVLR, starting from WEH and ending at EEH, is usually divided into three sections in various study reports, possibly for easy reference and understanding. The sections identified include:

=== Western section ===
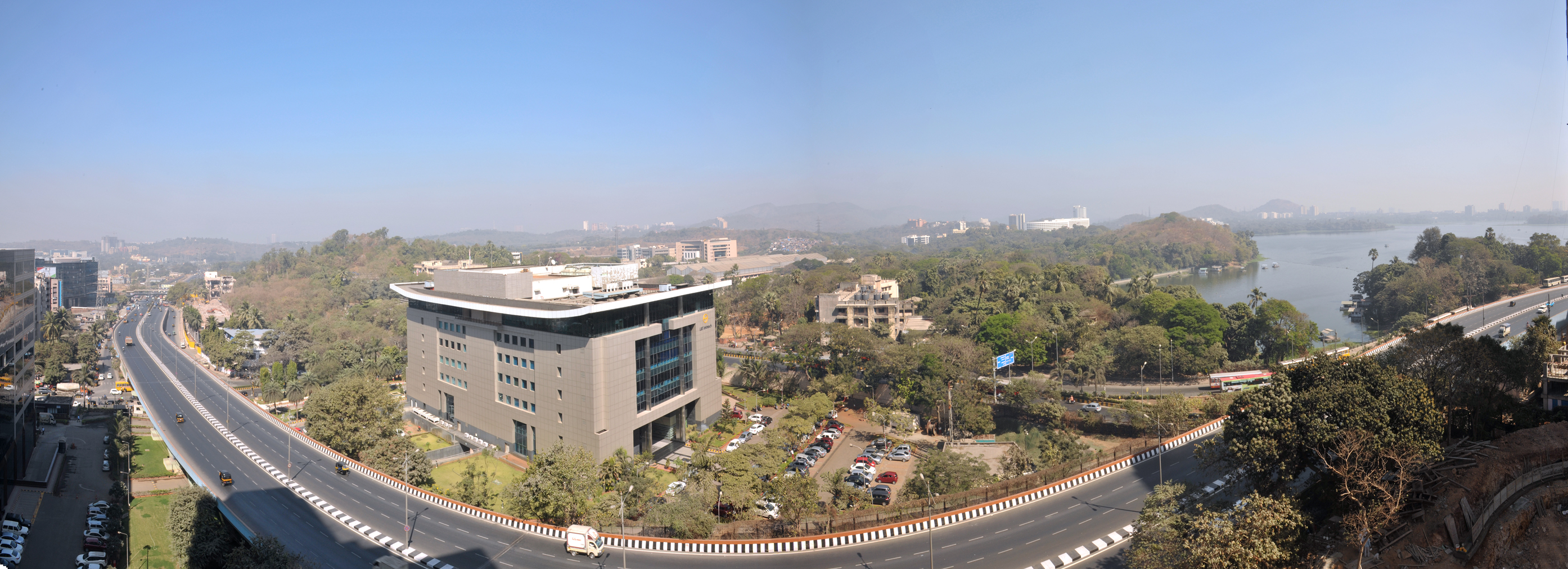
The JVLR & Powai Lake as seen from the top of Emerald Isle, Powai.

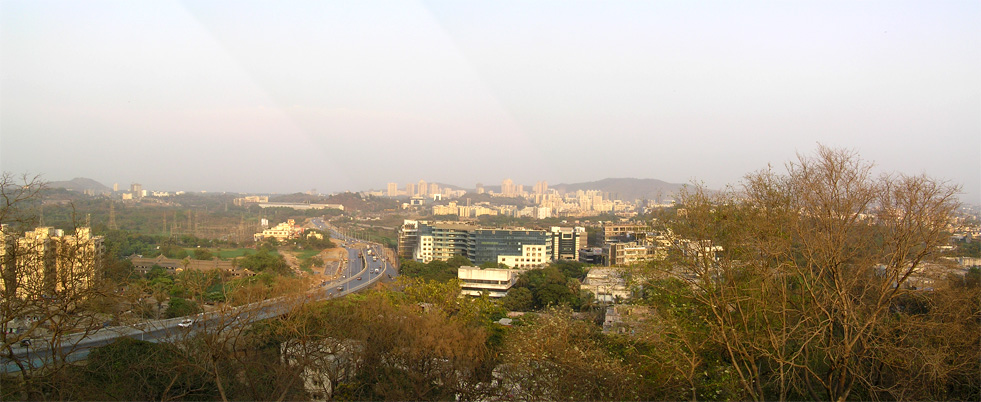
The JVLR as seen from the top of the Mahakali Caves in Andheri (East). The Powai and SEEPZ skylines are also visible.

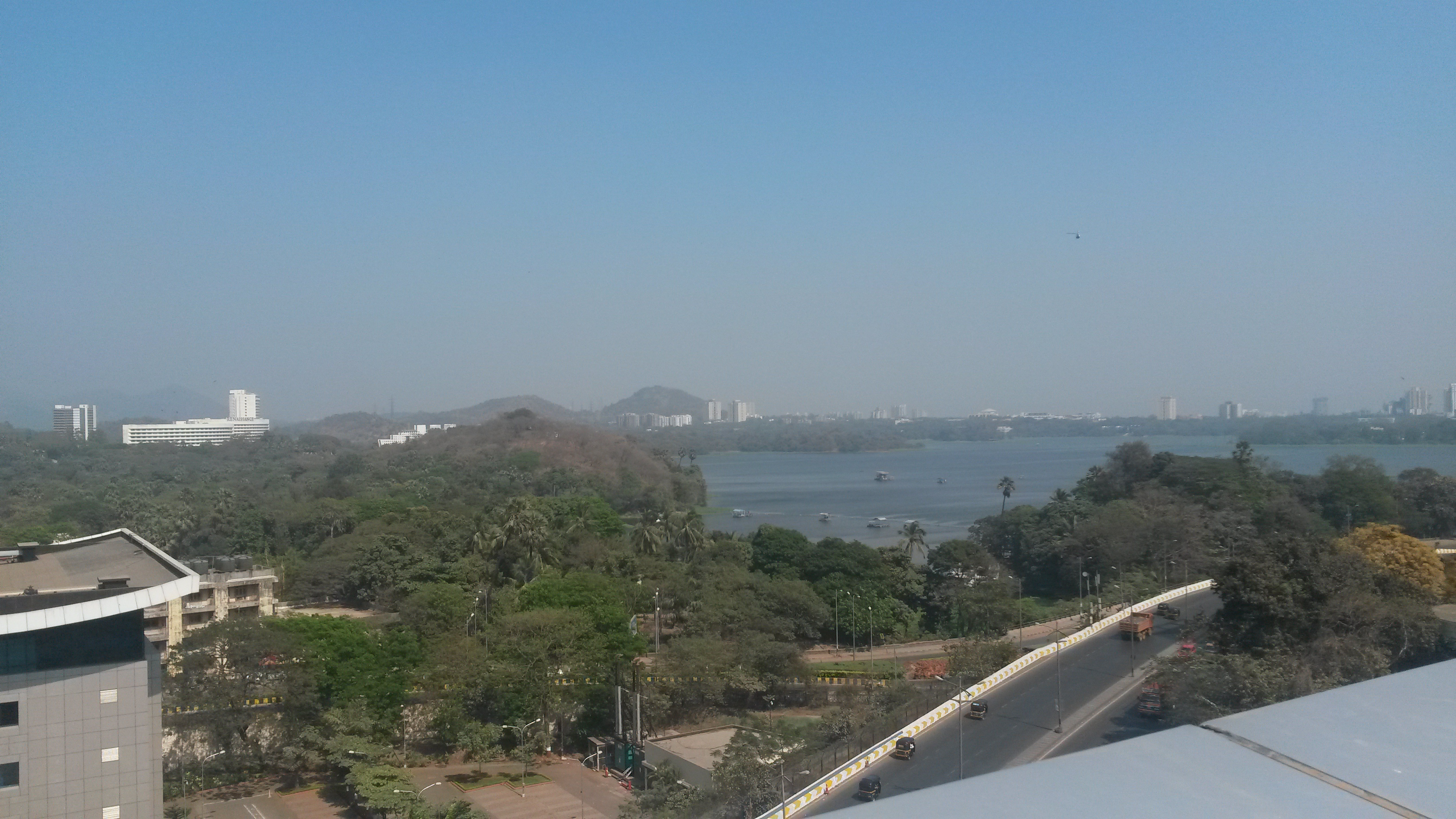
The JVLR, as seen from the top of Emerald Isle, Powai. The Powai Lake is also visible.

The segment of the JVLR which starts from the WEH junction and ends at the Saki Vihar road junction (near the L&T Factory) is referred to as Section 1 of JVLR. This section, being located on the western side is also referred to as the western section of the JVLR. The length of this section is 4.9 km. The original carriageway of the western section of JVLR was a 2-lane road consisting of 7 m wide asphalted carriageway with 2.5 m wide shoulders. This was later widened to a 6-lane divided carriageway configuration with a central median. A concrete pavement was also built for the six-lane widened carriageway, and a grade separator was built at SEEPZ road junction. The western section of JVLR passes through a slightly rolling terrain, encountering a few steep slopes the (max slope being 6.5%).

The western section of the road starts from east of the Jay coach Factory near WEH junction. From WEH, the road passes through a series of adjacent residential areas namely, Majeswadi, Pratap Nagar, Anand Nagar, Greenfields Society, Durga Nagar, and Sariput Nagar. Towards the western end of this section, a commercial recreation park called Fantasy Land was located, which has been closed and replaced by Oberoi Splendor Grande housing complex on the northern side of JVLR. Towards east of this, the JVLR aligns along Kamal Amrohi Studios, State Government-owned Nursery, the privately owned Matoshri Park, SEEPZ Industrial area, BSES Office, L&T Realty, and Larsen & Toubro (L&T) factory. Between BSES and L&T factory, JVLR crosses over the Aarey Farm area, Mithi River, and BMC Water Pipelines. Towards the end of this section, JVLR aligns through Milind Nagar and Tungawa hutments, and meets Saki-Vihar Road opposite L&T Gate No 5.

The land use pattern along the western section of the JVLR is predominantly residential, especially the stretch along the western end of the section. the residential areas viz., Majaswadi, Pratapnagar, Anand Nagar, Green Field Society, Durga Nagar, and Sariput Nagar are located along the western end of Section I of JVLR. The middle segment of this section passes through an open hilly area and the Aarey Farm area. Milind Nagar slums and Tungawa hutments, on either side, mark the eastern segment of the section. Besides residential land use, other major land uses observed along this section of JVLR are viz, industrial, commercial, and recreational. Major Industrial area viz. Santacruz Electronics and Export Promotion Zone (SEEPZ) is located along the road at Km 3+070. The L&T factory located at the eastern end of Section 1, is one major industry located along the road. Towards the east of the SEEPZ area, lies an extension (Phase II of SEEPZ) of the industrial promotion zone.

=== Middle section ===
The segment of the JVLR which starts from Saki Vihar Road junction and ends at LBS Marg junction (in Gandhi Nagar) is referred to as Section 2 of JVLR. As it is located in the middle of the entire JVLR, it is also referred as the middle section of the JVLR. The length of the middle section is 4.3 km. Section 2 was re-constructed with rigid pavement for a width of 2-4 lanes width (i.e. 7–14 m) in 1996–97. The pavement was widened in subsequent years with rigid pavement and flexible pavement in others. Section 2 was later widened by the BMC to an unequal width of 4-6 lane (with/without central median) with rigid pavement, barring a length of about one kilometre opposite the Indian Institute of Technology Bombay (lITB) campus. The entire Section 2 was widened to 6-lane with a central median in the 2000s under the MUTP. Out of six lanes, four central lanes have been constructed with flexible bituminous concrete and outermost lanes on either side have been asphalted. In the middle section, the terrain is slightly rolling, but the road alignment passes over almost level ground from L&T factory to lITB campus. Beyond lITB campus, the alignment runs down over a steep hill further to meet LBS Marg.

The middle section is aligned along the south bank of the Powai Lake, and the section is also known as Adi Shankaracharya Marg. The initial portion of the alignment starts with staggered junction on Saki Vihar road near the L&T premises and passes between north of L&T compound and south of Powai gardens before joining the north and south ramps of the JVLR. The initial portion of the alignment from Saki Vihar acts as slip roads to the L&T flyover, serving the traffic dispersal from the Saki Vihar Road. The alignment after the end of the flyover traverses east skirting Powai Lake and the IITB campus on its north and residential areas like MHADA and Hiranandani Gardens, as well as the Panch Kutir market area and other commercial areas opposite to IIT on its south. Immediately after lITB campus, JVLR runs close to the Holy Trinity Church, a Gurudwara and the Kendriya Vidyalaya (located within Indian Navy residential complex). After crossing lIT campus, the section further runs down over a steep hill to meet LBS Marg at Gandhi Nagar junction.

The land use pattern along the middle section of JVLR is predominantly Institutional, residential and commercial. Other major land use pattern observed is industrial land use along the western and eastern end of this stretch of JVLR. Powai Lake is located along the northern edge of JVLR. The significance and sprawl of the lake can be gauged from the fact that JVLR traverses along the southern bank of Powai Lake for a length of about one kilometre. Major institutions viz., the Indian Institute of Technology Bombay, the Maritime Training Institute, the Shipping Corporation of India, the Indian Register of Shipping, and private sector consulting firm SGS India Limited are located along this section of the JVLR. Hiranandani Gardens, a major residential township, is also located on the southern edge of JVLR, opposite Powai Lake. Besides Hiranandani Gardens, the Income Tax Officers Residential colony, the Coast Guard Officers Residential complex, the Indian Navy Civilian Residential colony and several private residential apartments lie along JVLR. Near the eastern end of this section and towards the southern edge of the JVLR, considerable sprawl of slums is also located behind the marble polishing and retail selling units. These slums are located in an unplanned and haphazard manner along the hilly stretches and hill tops. Solid waste generated from these slum residences is regularly dumped along the down slope of the hills causing immense blemish to an otherwise aesthetically pleasant area. The land value along this stretch of JVLR is constantly increasing and is considered to be one among highly valued locations in the metropolis of Mumbai.

=== Eastern section ===
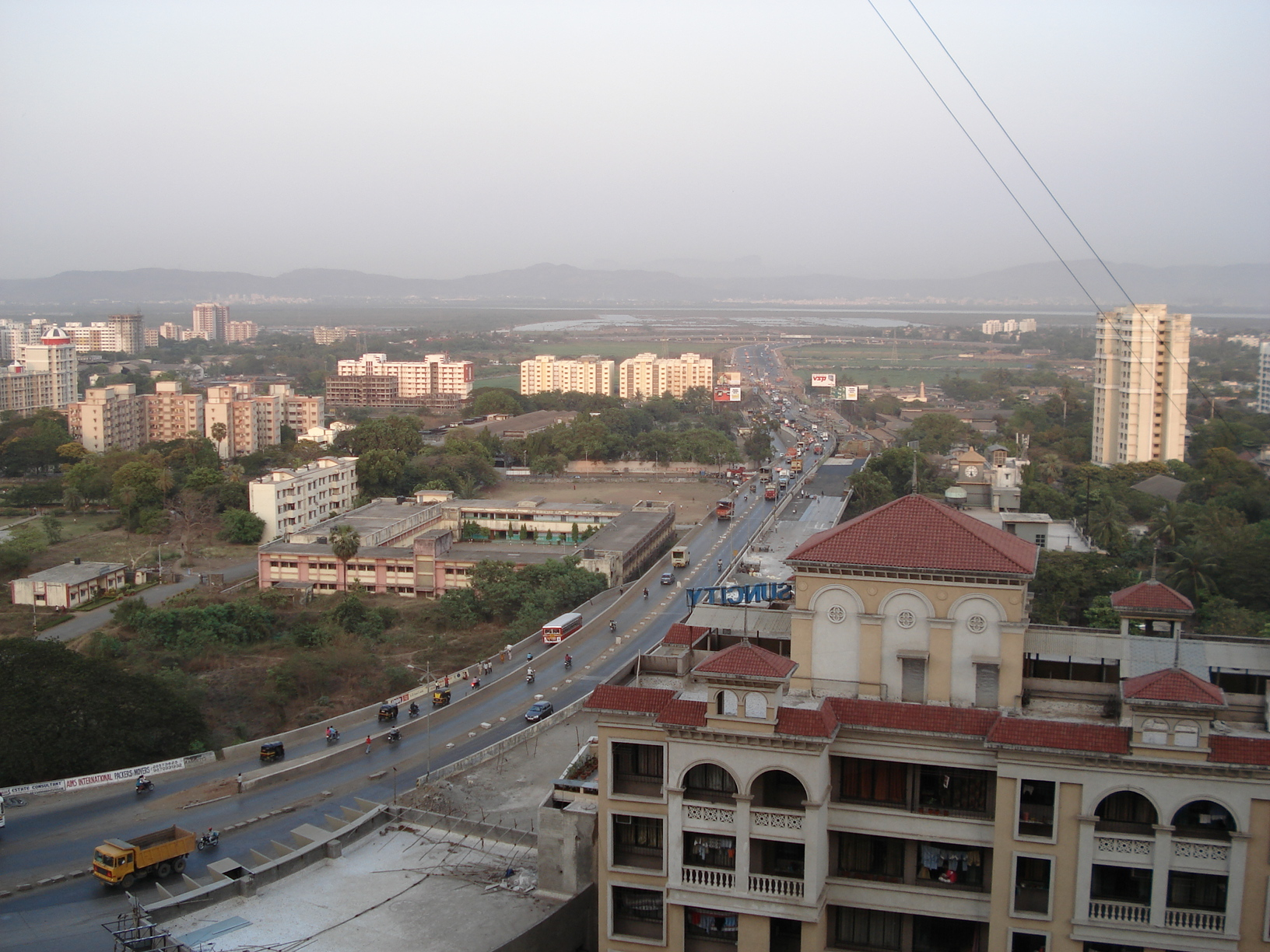
The JVLR as seen from the Suncity housing complex in Gandhi Nagar.

The segment of JVLR, which starts from LBS Marg junction and ends at EEH junction, has been referred as Section 3 of the JVLR. This section being located on the eastern side is also referred as eastern section of the JVLR. The length of eastern section is 1.1 km, making it the shortest among the three sections. This section was originally a 2-lane carriageway constructed with bituminous concrete. It was later widened to 2x3-lane divided carriageway with a central median. A flexible pavement was built for this section of carriageway. The eastern section passes through almost flat terrain except for the elevated embankment of the ROB over the central railway tracks.

The eastern section of JVLR starts from LBS Marg junction. Immediately after this major 4-way intersection, JVLR crosses over Central Line at about 100-metre distance. There is an existing 2-lane ROB on the JVLR at this location. The ROB is located in between Kanjurmarg and Vikhroli railway stations, which are located on the north and south of ROB respectively. Immediately after the ROB, on the eastern side of it and on either side of its embankment a sprawling slum area is located. The Tagore Nagar slums, located on the southern side of JVLR and ROB, is large in its spread and is well established. The area located on the northern side of ROB embankment and east of Kanjurmarg station, was identified as Relocation and Rehabilitation site for the Project affected persons (PAP) of various railway projects, that were implemented under MUTP. The land area on either side of JVLR and between ROB and EEH is essentially marshy with wild grass outgrowth to large extent. Kannamwar Nallah and many other man-made drainage channels carry considerable amount of sewage and criss-cross the marshy land area. The Tagore nagar slums and rehabilitation site are essentially marshy land reclaimed sites.

Along the eastern section of the JVLR, the land area is almost vacant except for the slums near the Central Railway tracks. The marshy and highly degraded wasteland engulfs the road from either side for most part of its length. A narrow industrial land use corridor is located between LBS Marg and the Central Line and running parallel to them is also observed. Major industrial facilities belonging to Hindustan Lever Limited, Sprite Industries and Cadilla Pharmaceuticals are located within this corridor. A part of the marshy and wasteland site opposite Kanjurmarg railway station was identified and chosen for resettling some of the Project affected families (PAFs) affected due to the railway projects that were implemented under the MUTP. With the implementation of various R&R and CEMP measures for this resettlement site, the land use pattern along northern edge of the JVLR stretch was altered.

=== Junctions ===
There are several minor junctions on the western section of the JVLR.

There are 5 major at-grade and grade-separated junctions or junction sets on the middle section, including the end junctions i.e. Saki Vihar Road junction and LBS Marg junction, the details of which are given below: The Saki Vihar Road junction, also known as the L&T junction, is the first junction on Section 2 and is a staggered one connecting Section 1 with Section 2 via the Saki Vihar road. The JVLR from the Section 1 side (or Jogeshwari side) and from Vikhroli side join the Saki Vihar Road in a staggered manner as the L&T land intercepts the JVLR for 100 m length of initial portion of Section 2. At this location, the L&T flyover across Saki Vihar road connects Section 1 with Section 2 through L&T land. Also, the initial portion of the alignment from Saki Vihar road junction acts as slip roads to the flyover, serving the traffic dispersal from the Saki Vihar road. The at-grade improvements to this intersection were required for easy movement of Turing traffic from/to Saki Vihar road and the JVLR, and for through movement of Saki Vihar road traffic. The at-grade improvements such as auxiliary lanes for free left turning, storage lanes for right turn traffic, channelised islands for guiding the traffic etc. were built for better functioning of ground traffic movement. Also, improvements like widening of carriageway to suit the intersection requirements, median and footpath of the existing Saki Vihar road for 150 m length on either side near the intersection was also carried out under the intersection improvements.

The Chandivali junction facilitates traffic exchange from AGLR and Saki Vihar road to the JVLR, and helps share the traffic load at Saki Naka junction.

Hiranandani junction and DP Road junction: The traffic on Hiranadani Road is mainly intra-city, when then intersects with a mixture of through and intra-city traffic on the JVLR. This road significantly contributes traffic inflow into junction and causes junction delays. Service roads were constructed connecting these two junctions, to ease off this condition and to facilitate through traffic on JVLR a hindrance free movement.

The IIT Main Gate junction and the IIT Market junction are both 3-armed junctions; the minor arm is very small road leading to residential areas. Both IIT Main Gate junction and IIT Market junction are provided with traffic signals and the main intention of these signals was for safe crossing of the pedestrians. Since, the distance between IIT Main Gate, IIT Market Gate and Gandhi Nagar junctions is less and due to high traffic volume on Adi Shankaracharya Marg, traffic jams are common especially during peak hours. Grade separated pedestrian facilities (like footbridges) have been constructed to reduce the necessity of pedestrian traffic signals at these locations and lead to faster traffic flow on the JVLR. The LBS Marg junction, also known as the Gandhi Nagar junction, is the last junction on Section 2 and is a 4-legged one. LBS Marg from Mulund side and Vikhroli side join the JVLR. This junction is the crossing of two important arterial roads of Mumbai carrying long distance through traffic and also local traffic. A flyover across LBS Marg at this location, connects Section 2 with Section 3 of the JVLR. The at-grade improvements to this intersection were required for easy movement of Turing traffic from/to LBS Marg and the JVLR, and for through movement of LBS Marg traffic. The at-grade improvements such as auxiliary lanes for free left turning, storage lanes for right turn traffic, channelised islands for guiding the traffic etc. were built for better functioning of ground traffic movement. Also, improvements like widening of carriageway to suit the intersection requirements, median and footpath of the existing LBS Marg for 150 m length on either side near the intersection was also carried out under the intersection improvements. The JVLR flyover slip roads on both sides are concretized.

The only junction on the eastern section of JVLR is with Seth Govindram Jolly Marg in Tagore Nagar, Vikhroli (East).

== History ==
Wilbur Smith & Associates, commissioned in 1962 to study transportation in Bombay, proposed the construction of several link roads to improve east–west road connectivity in the city. Among the projects proposed was a road from Godhbunder Road to the Western Express Highway interchange and beyond to Powai Road junction.

The JVLR, connecting the Western Express Highway at Jogeshwari and the Eastern Express Highway at Vikhroli, was opened to traffic in 1994. At the time, it provided the only direct east–west link between these Highways for a considerable distance towards north of Greater Mumbai. Prior to 1994, the link road was available for traffic only in segments. Access was possible from Andheri (East) through Marol and up to Kamal Amrohi studio on the western side. On the eastern side, access was possible from LBS Marg (Gandhi Nagar junction) and up to the Indian Institute of Technology (lIT) campus. In the mid-1980s, the section between IIT campus and Saki Vihar road was connected south of Powai Lake. The final 2-lane wide link connecting Kamal Amrohi studio and Saki Vihar Road was constructed in 1994. The JVLR had a varying cross section; the road was barely a 2-lane single carriageway for some of its length, with deficient geometry. It also carried significant goods traffic, and by 2002, was grossly inadequate to cater to traffic demand.

In 1994, a comprehensive transport plan was prepared by MMRDA to arrest and improve the deteriorating transport condition in the Mumbai Metropolitan Region. The study recommended that the existing 2-lane wide JVLR be widened to a 6-lane carriageway, as well as other improvements. The widening and improvement of the JVLR was later taken up under the Mumbai Urban Transport Project (MUTP). The MUTP identified a number of subprojects to strengthen the suburban rail and road transport in Greater Mumbai and the Mumbai Metropolitan Region (MMR) as a whole. As a part of the MUTP Road Transport Component programme, the existing 2-lane JVLR from the Western Express Highway (WEH) to the Eastern Express Highway (EEH), would be widened to a 6-lane road with a central median. The JVLR, along with the Santa Cruz – Chembur Link Road (SCLR), was one of the two east–west road corridor projects implemented under the first phase of the MUTP, and were intended to ease commutation problems and act as links between Mumbai's Eastern and Western Suburbs.

The World Bank agreed to provide financial assistance. The JVLR and SCLR projects were initially entrusted to the Public Works Department, and later to the Maharashtra State Road Development Corporation (MSRDC). The Mumbai Metropolitan Region Development Authority (MMRDA) was appointed as the nodal agency. The detailed engineering study for the project was carried out by Wilbur Smith Associates (WSA) during 1998–99. Detailed traffic analysis and forecast for the road was carried out by WSA in 1998 as part of the detailed engineering and design of the JVLR. A detailed project report was prepared by WSA in 1998.

The MMRDA appointed AIC Montgomery-Watson Consultants (India) Pvt Ltd to undertake preparation of the Environmental Assessment (EA) for the MUTP, in accordance with World Bank Operational Policy (then called Operational Directive 401) on Environmental Assessment. This EA process resulted in the preparation of Sectoral-Level Environmenital Assessment (SLEA), Programmatic Level Environmental Assessment (PLEA), and Micro-Level Environmental Assessment (MLEA). The SLEA was a strategic assessment, while the PLEAs were prepared for small generic sub-projects like flyovers, Road Over Bridges (ROBs) and Road Under Bridges (RUBs). MlEAs were prepared for larger sub-projects like road widening and extensions. These studies were undertaken between 1996 and 1998. The MMRDA also carried out various other preparatory studies on the JVLR project which included baseline socio-economic survey (BSES) of the project corridor in 1996; rehabilitation action plan (RAP) and community environment management plan (CEMP) in 1998; and rehabilitation implementation plan (RIP) in 2002. However, in view of the considerable passage of time, MMRDA and the project implementing agency (MSRDC) reviewed and updated all the preparatory study reports. This EA and environmental management plan report was thus an update of the MLEA report prepared by AIC in March 1998 and the CES Report prepared in January 2002. As the MLEA and associated EMP of the project were prepared in 1998, the MMRDA appointed CES to prepare the updated MLEA report. CES prepared the updated MLEA report taking into account the changes in baseline environmental conditions since 1998 and also the changes and minor alterations in technical proposals of the project. CES conducted a baseline survey in November 2001 and submitted the draft updated EA/EMP report to the MMRDA in January 2002 for review.

The MMRDA invited proposals from 6 shortlisted Consultancy firms vide its letter dated 3 March 2003, to provide the Consultancy Services for Section 2 of the JVLR with the objective of improving the road to uniform cross section of dual three lane, conforming to design standards being adopted for sections 1 and 3. All interested consultancy firms had accordingly submitted their proposals to the Chief, T & C Division, MMRDA. After the scrutiny and evaluation of all the proposals (technical and financial) the project is awarded to Consulting Engineering Services (I) Pvt. Ltd (CES) based on the technical merit and financial quotation. The letter of intent to commence the work was issued to the consultant vide MMRDA letter dated 3 August stating therein that the work has to commence within 10 days from the date of issue of letter. The formal contract between the MMRDA and CES for the consultancy services for the project was signed on 10 October 2003. The entire project to widen and improve the JVLR was implemented in two phases, and completed in February 2012 at a cost of ₹221.45 crore (equivalent to ₹417 crore or US$43 million in 2023).

== Widening and improvement ==
=== Land acquisition and rehabilitation ===
The overall responsibility for rehabilitation was entrusted to the MMRDA, who coordinated with all other agencies in the implementation process and oversaw the delivery of entitlements to the PAPs. The NGO, Slum Rehabilitation Society (SRS), was appointed to assist MMRDA in R&R implementation. The BSES for Phase I was updated in September 2005. The relocation process began in October 2004, and was scheduled to complete by December 2005. The entire resettlement process including registration of Co-operative Housing Societies, transfer of titles to PAPs and land to CHS, delivery of entitlements, assistance to economic rehabilitation was completed in a period of two years. The key activities included completion of land acquisition including transfer of land, organizing and preparing the PAH for shifting, forming and registering of co-operative housing societies and women's groups, actual shifting of affected residential and commercial units and completing post resettlement activities such as transfer of maintenance fund to society's account and initiation of economic rehabilitation activities through the Community Revolving Fund (CRF).

The total number of affected structures due to Phase I was 341 of which 241 were residential, 68 commercial, 5 residential-cum-commercial and 17 community and religious structures. Tenements and shops were constructed at Majas Resettlement site to resettle the project affected households losing structures. The Majas resettlement colony is within 2 km of the current location of the PAHs. All those who lost the houses for Phase I of the project were entitled to 20.91 sq. m free of cost. The affected shopkeepers were provided with more or less the same area as an alternative shop to enable them to continue their business in the new location up to a maximum of 70 sq. m. as per the R& R policy, but subject to payment for additional cost of the area above 20.91 sq. m. All the households and shopkeepers were accommodated in the tenements and shops constructed on the land at the Majas site, which is about 2 km from the project affected area. Some PAHs from Section III were provided an option of resettlement at a nearby site in Kanjurmarg. A parcel of 1.2 hectares of land was acquired from Majas village, situated within a 2 km radius of the affected structures of PAH. 1156 units (983 Residential, 140 shops and 33 Amenities) were constructed at the Majas site. All the residential and commercial PAHs were to be resettled at Majas Resettlement colony. The proposed resettlement site had a provision of allotment of society offices, balwadies, welfare centers and amenities. In addition to this, the community urban infrastructure facilities like water supply, storm water drains, septic tanks, and recreational garden and tree plantations were also provided. School and other educational facilities were provided on adjacent land.

=== Construction ===
Section I of the project consisted of the 4.9-kilometre-long (3.0 mi) stretch from the Western Express Highway to Saki-Vihar Road junction. Section II was the 4.4 km section from Saki–Vihar Road junction to LBS Marg junction, and Section III contained the 1.3 km stretch from LBS Marg junction to the Eastern Express Highway. For the purpose of execution, the work was divided into two phases - Phase I comprising Sections I and III and Phase II comprising Section II. The L&T Flyover and LBS Marg Flyover (which are part of the JVLR) were constructed up by the MSRDC as separate packages that were not financed through MUTP. The widening of the Kanjurmarg ROB over the Central Line in Section 3 was implemented as part of LBS Marg Flyover project.

After completion of construction work on the project, the JVLR was handed over to the BMC for further maintenance and operations. The entire project to widen and improve the JVLR was completed in February 2012 at a cost of ₹221.45 crore (equivalent to ₹417 crore or US$43 million in 2023).

=== Phase I ===
The contract for Phase I was put to tender for ₹738.1 million (US$7.7 million), and was awarded to a joint venture of NCC Ltd. and Maytas-Mahavir for ₹662.7 million (US$6.9 million). STUP Consultants Ltd. were appointed as Project Management Consultants for this phase. The notice to proceed with work (or work order) on Phase I was issued on 17 July 2003, and originally scheduled to complete in 20 months.

=== Phase II ===
The contract for Phase II was put to tender for ₹584.4 million (US$6.1 million), and was awarded to Unity Infraprojects Ltd. for ₹531.3 million (US$5.5 million). Consulting Engineering Services (I) Pvt. Ltd. were appointed as Project Management Consultants for this phase. The work order for Phase II was issued on 10 February 2005, and construction was originally scheduled to complete in 14 months.

== Mumbai Metro Pink Line ==
As part of the Mumbai Metro master plan, Line 6 (Pink Line) is being constructed on the road from Swami Samarth Nagar in Lokhandwala Complex, Andheri, to Kanjurmarg, between the west and east of Mumbai. It will also have seven interchanges, of which two will be with the Western and Central lines of the Mumbai Suburban Railway, and five with the Yellow, Red, Aqua, Green and Magenta Lines of Mumbai Metro. The Pink Line of Mumbai Metro will have the following stations along the Jogeshwari - Vikhroli Link Road- JVLR Junction (Interchange with the existing Red Line), Shyam Nagar, Mahakali Caves, SEEPZ Village, SakiVihar Road, Rambaug (Powai), Powai Lake, IIT Powai, Kanjurmarg West (Interchange with the under-construction Green Line) and Vikhroli EEH (Interchange with the proposed Magenta Line). The Pink Line is slated for completion in late 2023 or early 2024. However the carshed for the same has not been notified yet.

== Other ==
=== Drainage ===
The western section of JVLR drains through the Oshiwara river (via the WEH drainage system or via Majas Nallah) and Mithi river systems (directly into the river, via drainage channel at pipeline bridge or via the Saki Vihar road drainage system). Each system has its own network of tributaries and channels (nullahs) across JVLR. The Oshiwara river flows east into the sea and Mithi river flows south into Mahim creek. The middle section of the JVLR drains to Powai Lake (directly into the lake or via the Saki Vihar road drainage system) and Kannamwar Nagar Nallah (via the LBS Marg drainage system). The eastern section of the JVLR drains into the Kannamwar Nagar Nallah (directly to the nullah or via the LBS Marg drainage system).

Prior to the improvement of the JVLR under MUTP, along section 1 of the JVLR, the existing 2-lane carriageway had been provided with open roadside drains along the stretches that pass through habitations. Roadside drains were installed on one side or either side of the road between Pratap Nagar. (Km 0+000) to Poonam Nagar road junction (Km 2+000). Between Km 2+000 to 4+900, i.e. the end of section 1, no roadside drains were present. Along Section 2, roadside drains were provided on either side near IIT campus and one side near the stretches opposite Hiranandani Gardens. The downward slope side of the hill section does not have roadside drains. Along section 3, roadside drains were not provided along the existing 2-lane carriageway. Throughout the JVLR, no localised flooding has been reported except during incessant rains lasting for more than a week at a stretch. There are no low-lying areas along JVLR that are not connected to drainage system. Problems of water-logging and flooding are not reported in the area along the JVLR, possibly because of the rolling terrain and existence of good natural drainage systems.

Storm water drains were built on either side of JVLR as part of improvement made under MUTP. The new roadside drains were connected to the existing storm drainage system/drains in the area at appropriate locations. The design of storm water drainage system was based on the guidelines given by IRC SP–42. The important parameters in the design of storm drainage system are the design rainfall intensity and estimation of runoff. Concrete rectangular drains were installed along the road for the road surface drainage system.

=== Geology ===
Soil in the area is alluvial type mixed with sand and falls under the semi-impervious to impervious category. Soil erodibility is moderate. Soil analysis indicated that at all locations along the JVLR, it is sandy loam. Clay content is high above 50%. The soil falls under poor to fair category, with regard to using it in highway construction. The geology of the region is typical of the western coast of India, i.e. clayey soil underlain by basalt rock formations.

=== Ecology ===
The trees of avenue plantation along the western section of the JVLR include Acacia auriculiformis, Ailanthus excelsa, Albizia lebbeck, Bombax ceiba, Cassia siamea, Ficus benghalensis, Ficus religiosa, F. Glomerata, Pongamia pinnata, Terminalia catappa and the Thespesia populnea. The dominant avenue plantation along the eastern section of the JVLR showed similar composition as that of the western section. Along the eastern section, mangrove swamps are present along the southern edge of the road near the EEH junction. They have been significantly modified by human activity. The mangrove vegetation the region is a mixture of Avicennia marina, Acanthus ilicifolius, Excoecaria agallocha, Sesuvium portulacastrum and Aeluropus lagopoides, the majority of which is occupied by Avicennia marina, one of the widely occurring species of mangroves in and around Mumbai.

The widening of the JVLR required the felling of about 519 trees comprising 35 species during Phase I of the project. All the trees were indigenous species and did not fall under endangered variety. Compensatory plantation along either side of improved and widened JVLR was not possible for want of space. The detailed project report had proposed compensatory plantation near Aarey colony area, where ownership of land rests with the State government. Approximately 0.6 ha of land area was available for compensatory plantation in that area, which was far less than required for planting at least 519 trees. Hence besides Aarey colony area, other government-owned vacant areas were identified for afforestation purpose. No trees along the eastern section of the JVLR were affected by the project.

=== Gravity hill optical illusion ===
Magnetic L&T flyover or L&T flyover has an optical illusion of a gravity hill where vehicle seems to defy the gravity and roll from down slope to up the slope.

== See also ==
- Vikhroli-Koparkhairane Link Road (VKLR)
- Santa Cruz-Chembur Link Road (SCLR)
- Powai Lake
