= Syed Firoz Ashraf =

Indian educator and activist

Syed Feroze Ashraf (23 July 1943 – 8 June 2019) was an Indian teacher, trade unionist, journalist, writer, and activist known for his significant contributions to journalism, social work, and education.

== Early life and education ==
Born in Hazaribagh, Bihar (now in Jharkhand), Ashraf dedicated his life to fostering education among underprivileged children and bridging communal divides.

Ashraf was forced to migrate to the Muslim-majority Jogeshwari, Mumbai from Malad, Mumbai after the Bombay riots due to growing Islamophobia in Hindu-majority areas.

Ashraf completed his BSc from Ranchi University and pursued a Diploma in Journalism from the Bharatiya Vidya Bhawan in Mumbai. He embarked on his journalistic career in 1966, making regular contributions to various dailies, periodicals, and magazines.

== Accolades and recognition ==
Ashraf earned literary accolades including the Maharashtra State Urdu Sahitya Academy Award for outstanding contribution to journalism. Apart from his journalistic endeavors, Ashraf wrote scripts for television serials, showcasing his versatility in the realm of media.

"Uncle: A School in himself", a documentary short film, was created by Observer Research Foundation on Ashraf.

== Career ==
One of Ashraf's most enduring legacies was his commitment to education and social work. In 1997, he initiated free tuition classes for children from economically disadvantaged backgrounds. His classes, known as "Uncle's Classes," became an institution in Jogeshwari, Mumbai. Ashraf's mission extended beyond academics. He and his wife, Arifa, not only provided educational support but also addressed the holistic needs of their students. They offered meals, moral support, outings, and even medical assistance. His efforts were particularly focused on empowering young girls, encouraging them to pursue education beyond societal expectations.

Ashraf's mission expanded to encompass multiple areas in Jogeshwari, including Jogeshwari West, Jogeshwari East, and Juhugali (Andheri). Despite financial challenges, he received support from philanthropists, including Razzak Allana, chairman of Allana Foundation, and the Vikas Adhyayan Kendra. His dedication bore fruit, with the first batch of students passing the SSC exams in 1998. Many of his students, irrespective of their religious background, continued to pursue higher education and contribute positively to society.
