= Eastern Express Highway =

Motorway in Mumbai and Thane

- Eastern Express Highway shown in Red
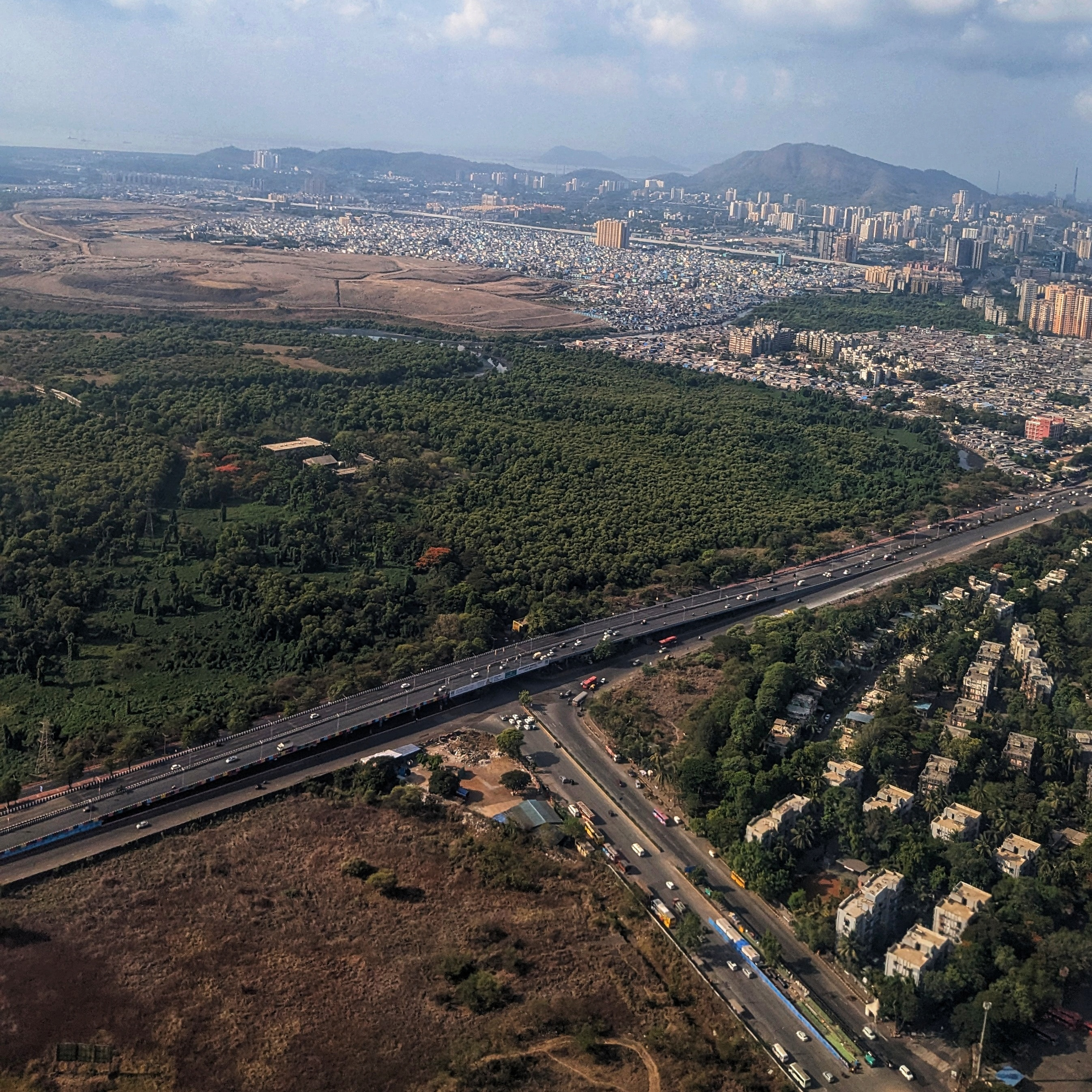
- Junction at Ghatkopar

Route information
- Maintained by MMRDA, MSRDC
- Length: 23.55 km (14.63 mi)

Major junctions
- North end: Thane
- Ghodbunder Road/ NH-48, LBS Marg (Teen Haath Naka) in Thane, Bhandup-Airoli Bridge Road in Bhandup; JVLR in Vikhroli; SCLR and GMLR (Ghatkopar - Mankhurd Link Road) in Chembur
- South end: Chhatrapati Shivaji Maharaj Terminus

Location
- Country: India
- States: Maharashtra
- Major cities: Thane, Mumbai

Highway system
- Roads in India; Expressways; National; State; Asian

Eastern Express Highway, abbreviated to EEH, is a 23.55 km (14.63 mi) long highway connecting the cities of Mumbai and Thane. It is one of the busiest roads in the Mumbai Metropolitan Area and is a part of the National Highway 48. It is a north–south artery of Mumbai connecting the city proper to the eastern suburbs and to the metropolitan area of Thane. For most of its course, it is 6 lanes wide (3 lanes in each direction) with over a dozen flyovers/grade separators.

== Route ==
The highway begins at the Chhatrapati Shivaji Maharaj Terminus and stretches up to Thane. At Chembur, it cuts off from the Sion Panvel Highway at the RCF Junction (Priyadarshini), to the outer limits of the city. It has heavy traffic during rush hours – southbound traffic in the morning rush hour; while northbound traffic is heavy during the evenings. It is used by an estimated 50,000 passenger cars daily. Towards the south, beyond Sion, it continues as Dr Ambedkar Road. Linking Sion in central Mumbai to Thane and beyond, the Eastern Express Highway is one of the several key roads widened and improved under the Mumbai Urban Infrastructure Project, by firms contracted by the Mumbai Metropolitan Region Development Authority (MMRDA).

Link roads connecting WEH (Western Express Highway) and EEH, such as the Jogeshwari–Vikhroli Link Road (JVLR) and Santa Cruz–Chembur Link Road (SCLR) are the major arterial roads of the Mumbai suburban road network. Both the WEH and the EEH run along the north to south direction and are parallel in certain sections.

== See also ==
- Lal Bahadur Shastri Marg
- Sion Panvel Highway
- Mumbai–Pune Expressway
- National Highway 48 (India)
- Western Express Highway
- Eastern Freeway (Mumbai)
