= Carona Shoes =

Indian shoe company

- Formerly: Carona Sahu Shoe Company
- Industry: Shoes
- Founded: 1953
- Headquarters: Mumbai, India

Carona Shoes, originally known as the Carona Sahu Shoe Company, was incorporated in 1953 and managed by the Sahu family until 1984. In 1984, the company headquarters in D N Road, Mumbai (near Fort) was engulfed by fire. In the same year, the company was acquired by the Khataus after which it got the present name.

== History ==
The company previously manufactured canvas and rubber footwear. It had its manufacturing facilities in Mumbai (Jogeshwari), Aurangabad and Ahmedabad. In 1989, the company entered into a technical agreement with Puma AG Rudolf Dassler Sport, Germany, to manufacture sports and special application shoes. In June 1989, a proposal to establish a facility in Aurangabad to produce athletic shoes was made public. A break in the Khatau family led to a management reorganization in 1995. In addition to the manpower shortage, the business also struggled to compete with lower-end goods like canvas and rubber boots. The company was incurring losses. Hence, in 1995, it disposed of its Jogeshwari plant where operations had been partially suspended since March 1994. Around 800 of its 1200 workers were retrenched through a Voluntary Retirement Scheme. The company renewed its agreement for five years with Puma in 1995. During the year 1999, the company was registered as a sick company under SICA 1985 and BIFR appointed Bank of India as its operating agency to expedite the preparation of the Draft of Rehabilitation Scheme (with inputs from India Infoline).

In its prime, Carona was a heritage brand of India and the second largest footwear company in India. Carona thrived during the license control regime in India. The brand thrived alongside, and fought head on with the market leader Bata. The shops and the products between the two brands were extremely similar. When Bata launched one style, Carona quickly followed suit. Both Bata and Carona were instrumental in popularizing canvas shoes in India, which were popular among younger children at that time.

== Decline ==
In the 1990s, new brands began to enter the market with new designs. Foreign brands like Nike, Reebok and Adidas began to market their products aggressively which further worsened the position of Carona. Unlike Carona, Bata had the backing of its foreign parent which helped it work through the restructuring exercise. Bata was able to sustain itself by launching new models at affordable prices, while Carona was not able to meet the market with new launches. Both Bata and Carona had their own showrooms which became expensive to maintain. Carona went in to the BIFR fold in 1998.
