= Santacruz–Chembur Link Road =

Major artery in Mumbai

Santacruz–Chembur Link Road (SCLR)
- Santacruz–Chembur Link Road marked in Red on Mumbai area map
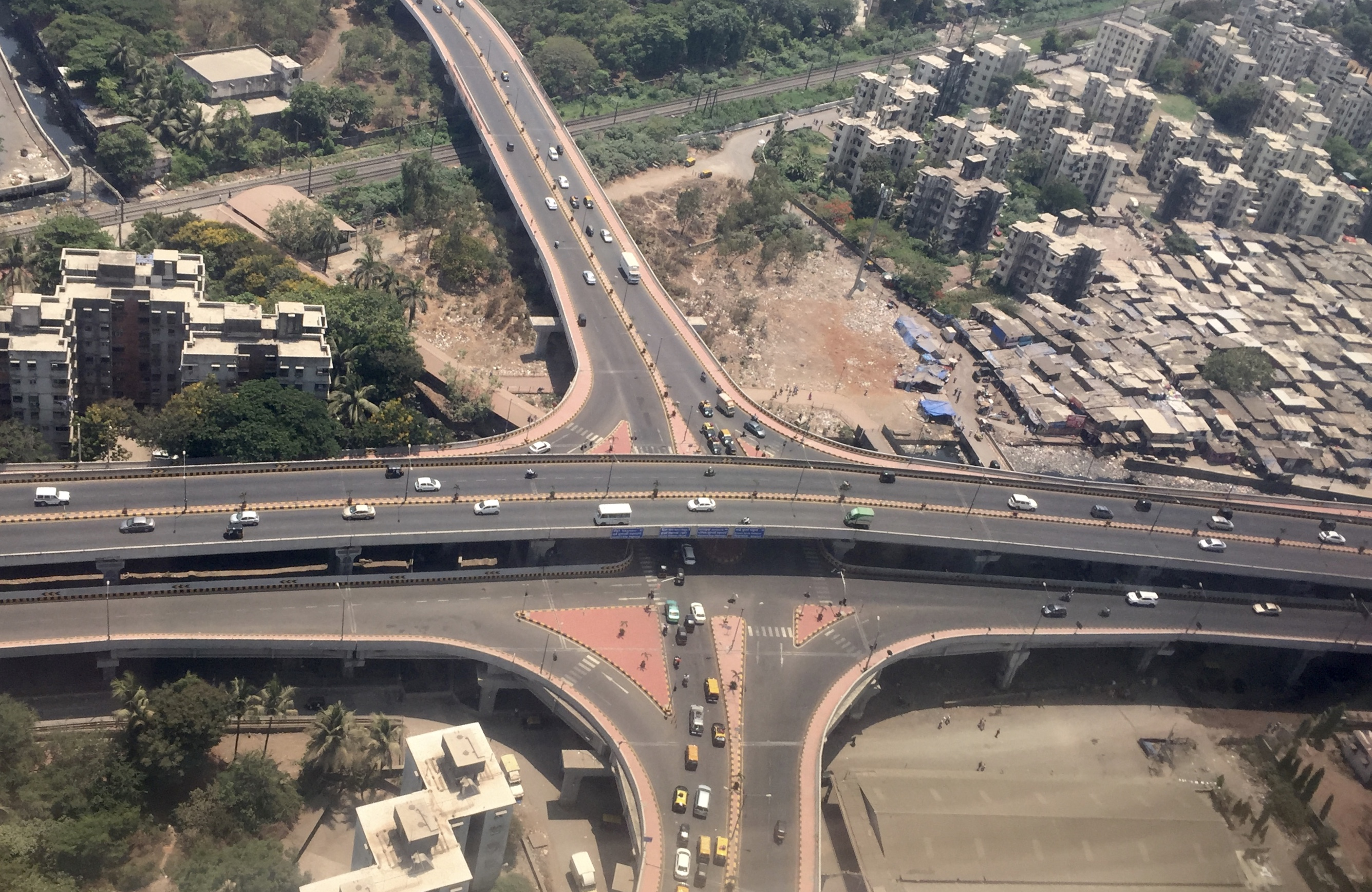
- Aerial view of Santacruz–Chembur Link Road

Route information
- Maintained by Brihanmumbai Municipal Corporation
- Length: 6.45 km (4.01 mi)
- Existed: 18 April 2014; 10 February 2023 (extension flyover)–present

Major junctions
- West end: Western Express Highway, Santacruz
- CST Road in Santacruz (East); LBS Road in Kurla (West)
- East end: Eastern Express Highway, Tilak Nagar, Chembur

Location
- Country: India
- States: Maharashtra
- Districts: Mumbai Suburban
- Major cities: Mumbai

Highway system
- Roads in India; Expressways; National; State; Asian

The Santacruz–Chembur Link Road, shortened to SCLR, is a 6.45-kilometre-long (4.01 mi) arterial road in Mumbai, connecting the Western Express Highway (WEH) in Santacruz with the Eastern Express Highway (EEH) in Chembur. It contains the city's first and India's second double-decker flyover. The six-lane road was constructed as part of the World Bank-funded Mumbai Urban Transport Project (MUTP) at a cost of ₹454 crore (US$47 million). The World Bank withdrew funding midway through the project due to repeated delays, and the second phase was financed by the Mumbai Metropolitan Region Development Authority (MMRDA) with its own funds.

The SCLR was severely delayed, taking more than 11 years for the work to be completed. Groundwork for the road, originally slated to start in 2003, did not get underway until 2007. The project missed 12 deadlines since the original deadline of November 2004. The SCLR was termed an "engineering marvel" by the National Geographic Society, and was described by the World Bank as the "world's most delayed road project".

A portion of the SCLR, the 560 m Kurla–Kalina flyover over LBS Marg, was opened to the public on 10 August 2012. The SCLR was opened to the public on 18 April 2014.

== History ==
=== Background ===
Wilbur Smith and Associates were commissioned in mid-1962 to study and make recommendations on transportation issues in Greater Mumbai. Their report, filed with the Ministry of Road Transport and Highways on 19 December 1963, proposed the construction of several link roads to improve east–west connectivity in the city. Among the projects proposed was a 4-lane road linking Santacruz in the west with Chembur in the east.

The Mumbai Urban Transport Project (MUTP) was initiated in 2002 to study and propose solutions to Mumbai's transportation issues. The SCLR, along with the widening and improvement of the Jogeshwari–Vikhroli Link Road (JVLR), was one of two east–west road corridor projects implemented under the first phase of the MUTP, and were intended to ease commutation problems and act as links between Mumbai's Eastern and Western Suburbs.

Prior to the SCLR's opening, commuters traveling from the Western Suburbs towards the Eastern Suburbs or Navi Mumbai had to take the JVLR, the Andheri-Kurla Road or a detour from Sion to reach Chembur. During peak hours, this would take 90 minutes to 2 hours. After the SCLR opened, travel time between Santacruz and Chembur reduced to 17 minutes. The SCLR is an important arterial road connecting the Western and Eastern Express Highways. The SCLR is expected to significantly decongest the EEH and the WEH, and ease traffic congestion at the Amar Mahal Junction, Vakola, Kalanagar Junction, Sion and Kurla. It will also decrease traffic congestion on roads in Santacruz, Kalanagar, Dharavi, Sion and Chembur. The Times of India reported that commuters can save ₹ 50–60 on auto rickshaw and taxi fares (at April 2014 rates) when traveling between the Eastern and Western Suburbs via the SCLR.

=== Land acquisition and rehabilitation ===
Government land measuring 10,705.51 square metres belonging to the MHADA, the BMC, the Railways, and the Kurla Dairy, was transferred for use in the project. However, additional acquisition of private land was necessary to implement the project, and approximately 1091.90 square metres of private land was acquired for the same.

The total land required for Phase II of the project for up to 45.7 m width of ROW was 1,34,358 sq m. Out of which the 88,200 sq. m of the land for the existing 30 m width of ROW was acquired by the Public Works Department (PWD) and handed over to the BMC. Between 30 and 45.7 m width of ROW, 46,158 sq. m land was required, of which, about 5,596 sq.m of land was in the possession of the BMC (2,047 sq m.) and the government (3,549 sq m). Land acquisition for the SCLR project was carried out by the BMC. As a result of Phase II of the project, a total 434 structures were affected out of which 235 were residential, 193 commercial and 6 residential-cum-commercial. In addition to this there were 5 other structures affected which consisted of one balwadi, one newspaper library, one post office, a structure on private land, and one Bank.

A total of 3167 structures would be impacted—2575 residential, 540 commercial, 33 residential-cum-commercial, and 19 community/religious structures. As of 30 April 2006, a total of 2591 structures had been resettled—2418 residential, 145 commercial, 26 residential-cum-commercial, and 2 religious/community structures. People impacted by the project were resettled at a resettlement site in Mankhurd, which is about 7 km from the location of affected structures at SCLR phase-II. The Mankhurd resettlement site had a total of 3,256 residential tenements and 720 commercial tenements.

=== Construction ===
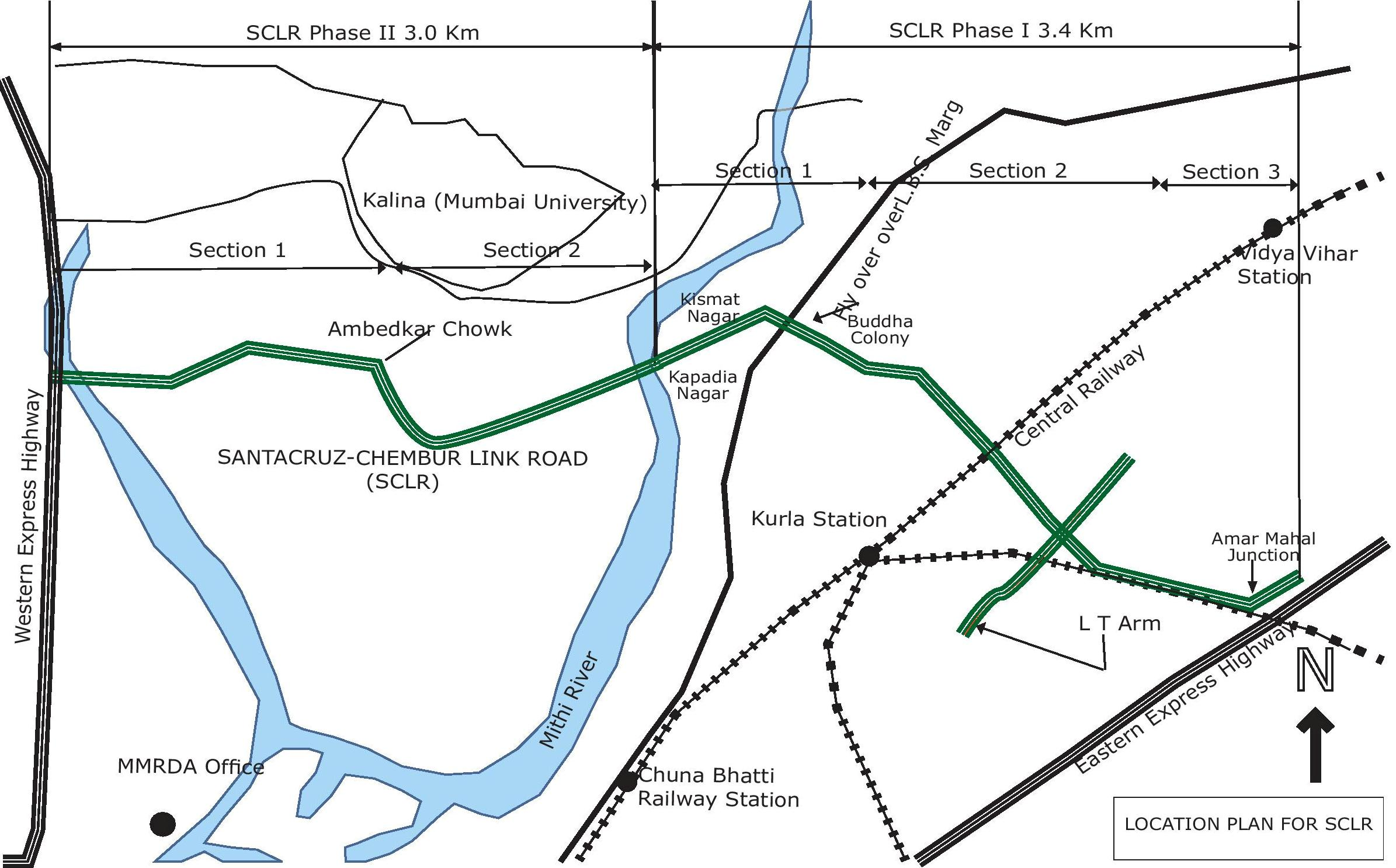
SCLR location map.

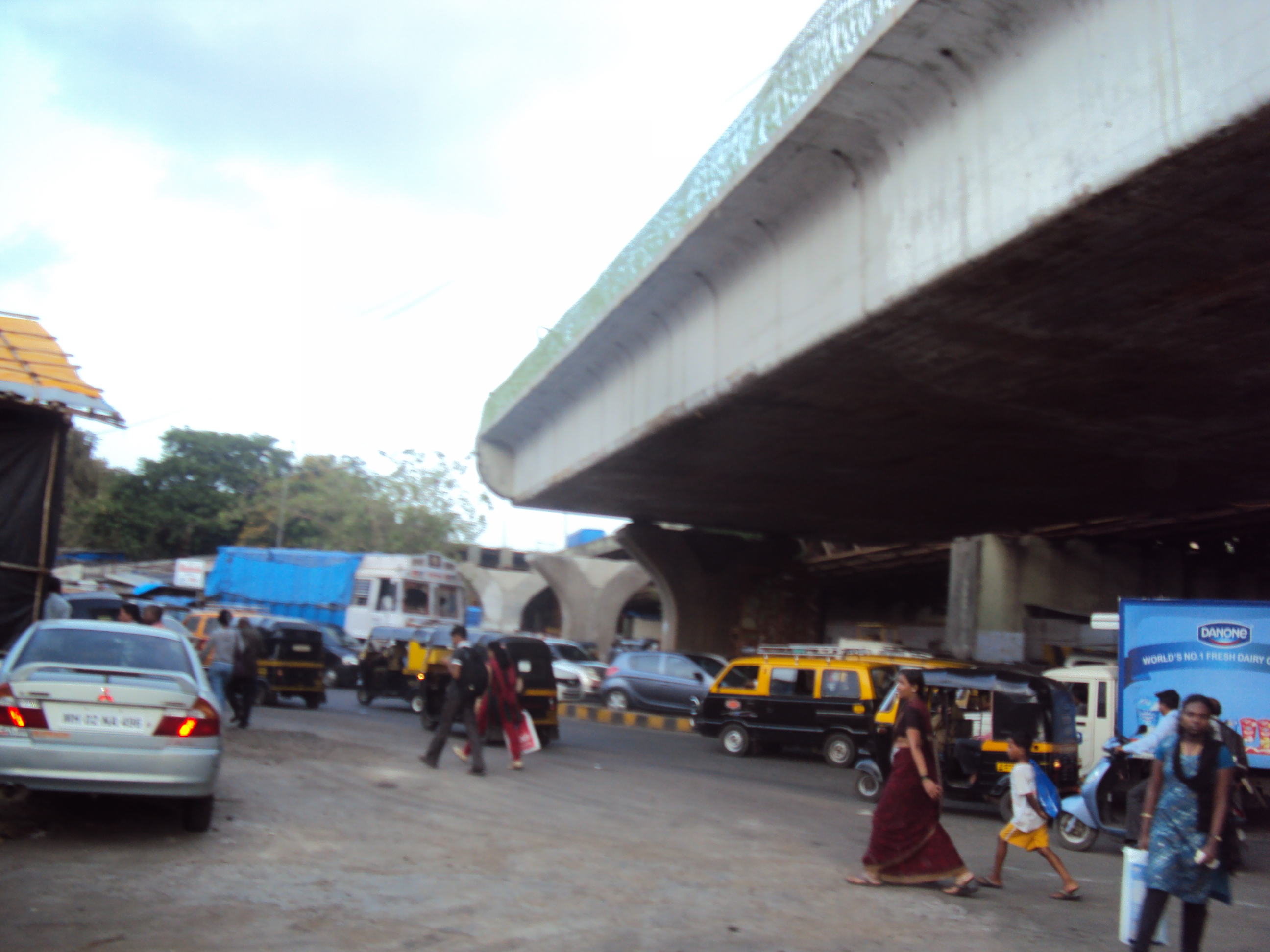
The SCLR under construction in Amar Mahal.

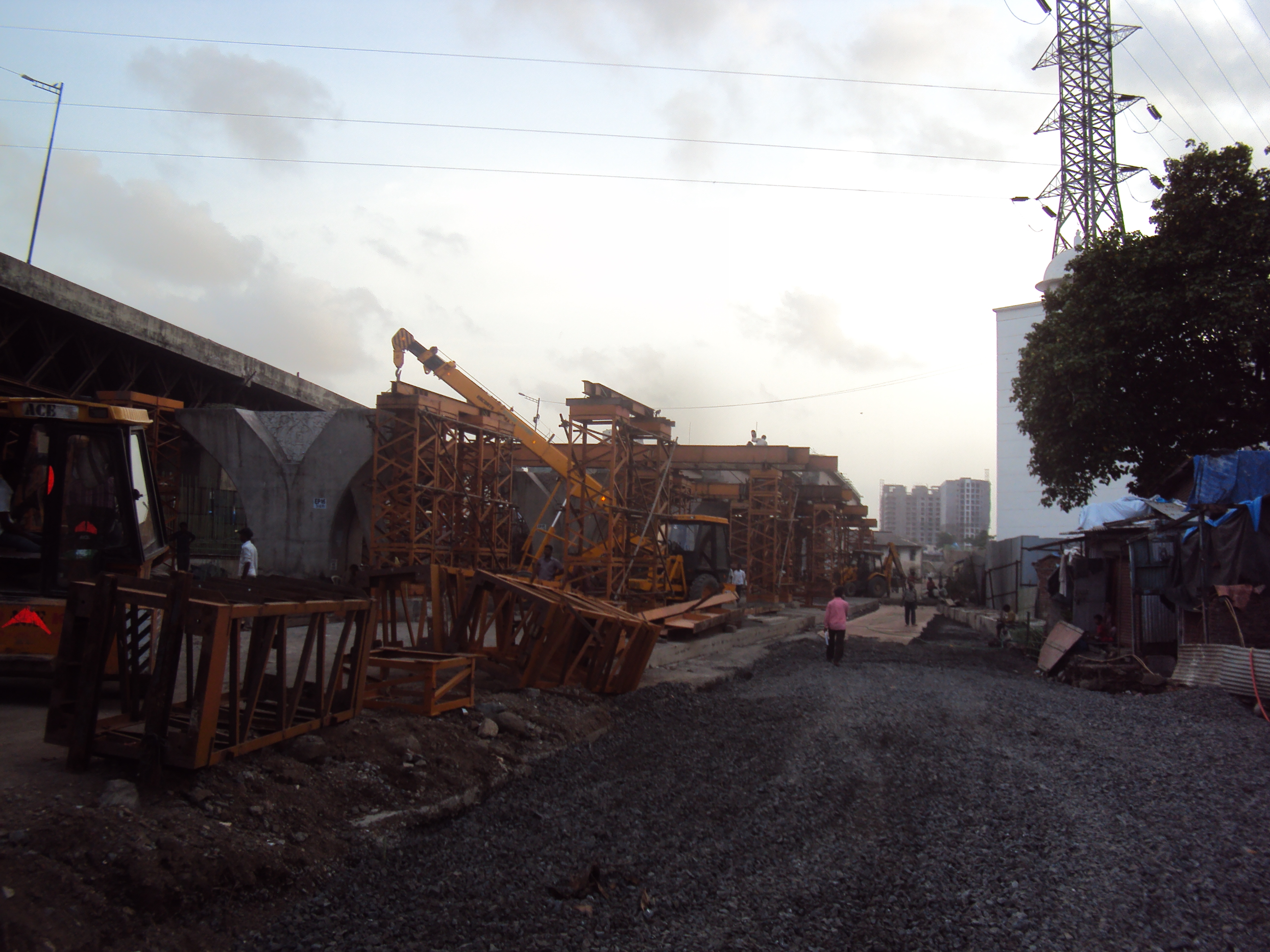
The SCLR under construction in Amar Mahal.

The SCLR was commissioned in 2003 under the World Bank-funded MUTP, and was originally scheduled to be completed by November 2004. The SCLR and JVLR projects were initially entrusted to the Public Works Department (PWD). Responsibility for the project was later transferred to the Maharashtra State Road Development Corporation (MSRDC), and the Mumbai Metropolitan Region Development Authority (MMRDA) was appointed as the nodal agency. The SCLR project was implemented in two phases. The first phase was executed by the MSRDC and the second phase was executed by the Brihanmumbai Municipal Corporation (BMC). Phase I comprises the 3.45-kilometre-long (2.14 mi) section from the east end of the 6-lane Mithi River Bridge up to the Amar Mahal Junction of the Eastern Express Highway. Phase II consists of the 3 km section from the WEH to the Mithi River. Phase I was funded by the World Bank, while Phase II was financed by the MMRDA with its own funds.

Section 1 and 2 were contracted to Patel Engineering Ltd and Gammon India Ltd. respectively. The Louis Berger Group Inc. served as Project Management Consultants for both sections. The contract for civil work for Section 1, signed on 29 September 2003, had a value of ₹ 33.81 crore (US$7.514 million).

Construction of the SCLR was contracted to Patel Engineering Ltd and Gammon India Ltd. for ₹ 35 crore and ₹ 79.9 crore respectively. Gammon was awarded nearly 75% of the total civil work on the project. The Louis Berger Group Inc. served as Project Management Consultants. The notices to proceed with work (or work orders) for section 1 and 2 were issued on 29 September 2003 and 10 May 2004. However, the project was severely delayed. The MMRDA later hiked the values of both contracts by 15% to keep up with cost escalation caused by delays. Patel Engineering briefly halted construction on the project for several months in 2011, asking for another hike in contract value. The MMRDA agreed to hike both contract values by 30-35%, and Patel Engineering resumed work in January 2012. As of April 2011, Gammon had already spent ₹ 113.1 crore, and Louis Berger had reportedly spent nearly five times the original amount.

=== Other work ===
In September 2013, the MMRDA invited agencies to prepare a Detailed Project Report (DPR) for three proposed bridges. The first flyover is planned from Bandra-Kurla Link Road to CST Junction in Kurla, and the second will be from Mumbai University junction in Kalina to CST Road. The third DPR concerns the remodelling of the existing CST Bridge. After remodelling, the 40-metre-long (130 ft) and 30 m wide bridge would be 100 m long and will 45 m wide.

=== Delay ===
Although, the groundwork for the link road was originally planned to commence in September 2003, it began only in 2007. The SCLR was severely delayed, taking more than 11 years for the work to be completed. The project missed 12 deadlines since the original deadline of November 2004. Following this, 11 other deadlines have been fixed and missed for the project: September 2006, December 2008, December 2009, June 2010, June and December 2011, December 2012, March 2013, October 2013, December 2013 and 31 March 2014. The cost of constructing the SCLR was originally estimated as ₹ 114.96 crore in 2003. This was revised to ₹ 254.76 crore in August 2011. According to the reply from the MMRDA to a Right to Information (RTI) request filed by RTI activist Anil Galgali, the latest estimated project cost is ₹454 crore (US$47 million), an escalation of 391.30%.

Thousands of displaced residents had to be relocated, leading to delays. The World Bank initially provided loans to the project, but later withdrew. Roberto Zagha, India head of the World Bank, called it the "world's most delayed road project". An MMRDA official defended the delay in the project stating, "It was huge project ... We had to resettle more than 3,500 project-affected people. There were also issues will relocation of a religious structure, and a politician's interference, too, did not help. It is easy to lay the blame, but the work was challenging. We also had to face several court cases. We have learnt many lessons from this project."

A major delay occurred in getting clearance from Central Railway (CR) to construct a 50.9-metre bridge over the Central Line. Despite receiving the request in 2007, CR took 5 years and asked for 4 changes in design before finally approving construction in July 2012. The approval came with the rider that MMRDA could only start construction in October 2012, after the monsoon. A railway official defended CR stating, "MMRDA blamed us for the delay. But the design of the road overbridge across the tracks was such that it would not have got the commissioner of railway safety's approval. The consultants should have thought about this long ago. We had also given blanket approval to launch girders more than a year ago. But the girder-launching work was carried out six months ago as they did not arrive from Punjab at the site, where, too, no preparations were made." The MMRDA also faced challenges launching the 14 girders, each weighing 140 tonne, as they could only carry out work for 3 hours at night to avoid affecting rail traffic. All girders were launched in 21 days. According to Jitendra Gupta of the Citizens' Transport Committee, "There is no accountability and coordination among the government agencies involved. We had met the railway chief engineer in charge of the project around four years ago and were told that he had 200 proposals like the SCLR to examine because of his wide jurisdiction. He said he couldn't make an exception for the SCLR and speed up clearances."

=== Opening ===
A portion of the SCLR, the 560 m Kurla-Kalina flyover over LBS Marg, was opened to the public on 10 August 2012.

According to the reply from the MMRDA on 24 March 2014 to an RTI request filed by RTI activist Anil Galgali, construction work on the SCLR was complete on the sections from the Mithi river to Ghazinagar, Kurla (W), and from Ghazinagar, Kurla (W) to Rahul Nagar, Tilak Nagar. However, the section from Rahul Nagar to Eastern Express Highway via Amar Mahal flyover was incomplete. MMRDA Executive Engineer M.A. Wani noted that part of the delay was caused by a change in the specification for a girder from concrete to steel. The decision was approved by executive committee of MMRDA in its meeting held on 11 January 2012.

The MMRDA issued a press note on 13 April stating that the SCLR was complete. Bitumen work was pending at the Chembur end, apart from which streetlights had also not been installed on the entire length of road. The approach road to the landing at Nehru Nagar had also not been completed, and road medians were still being placed at the Chembur end. The Opposition alleged that the project saw delays due to the government's "inefficiency" and was being opened ahead of elections as a "pre-poll stunt". Mumbai Bharatiya Janata Party President Ashish Shelar wrote a letter to the Election Commission on 14 April, calling the SCLR opening a "publicity stunt" and opposing the inauguration stating that the Congress party would "reap undue credit for it". RTI activist G.R. Vora and Action for Good Governance and Networking in India activist Shyama Kulkarni both questioned why the opening took place so close to the election.

The media reported that some motorists used the SCLR on 15 April, even though it had not been officially opened. DNA reported that the traffic on the road was mostly bikers and private cars.

The SCLR was inaugurated by MMRDA officials at 8:15 am IST on 18 April 2014. Unlike most projects in India, the SCLR was opened without fanfare, and no politicians were present at the opening, as the code of conduct for the 2014 general elections was in force at the time. Traffic was sparse on opening day, which officials believe was because it was a public holiday due to Good Friday. Inadequate signage meant some motorists had to ask for directions. MMRDA officials installed additional signboards by 21 April, but they failed to improve the situation because they were too small.

According to then DCP (traffic) Pratap Dighovkar, about 22,000 vehicles used the SCLR on opening day. Traffic remained skeletal on the second day as well. More than 50,000 vehicles used the road on the third day. Increased traffic caused jams on the third day, mainly due to a Congress election rally at BKC. On 28 April, a Monday, the first working day since the road opened, an estimated 55,000-60,000 vehicles travelled on the SCLR. Heavy congestion was reported on certain stretches of the road, particularly on Hans Bhugra and Mohammad Raza Road junctions in Santacruz (E). Mumbai Traffic Police officers stated that Mohammad Raza Road needs to be widened as it is a main feeder to SCLR.

Joint commissioner of traffic B.K. Upadhyay noted that the MMRDA had failed to complete widening of feeder routes before completion of the project. The Citizen Transport Forum carried out an audit of the SCLR on the third day after opening, and identified seven major bottlenecks along the road. Upadhyay told the Mumbai Mirror on 29 April that these issues could be fixed by widening the roads and installing traffic lights. However, he noted that an eighth problem, at Mohammed Raza Chowk, where traffic from BKC Road and the SCLR merge, accounted for 90% of the jams. He felt that the situation could be improved by installing traffic signals at the junction, but even that would not resolve the entire problem.

BEST began operating buses on the SCLR for the first time from 2 May 2014.

== Route description ==
The SCLR is 6.45 km long and 45.7 metres wide. The SCLR has three flyovers: CST Road flyover (the main flyover spanning a total length of 3.45 km), the 560-metre Kurla-Kalina flyover above LBS Marg, and the double-decker flyover (combined length of 1.8 km) crossing over the Central and Harbour Line tracks at Tilak Nagar. The SCLR also has two arms—one for Lokmaniya Tilak Terminus and the other one for Kurla Dairy. The 1,096-metre-long (3,596 ft) Amar Mahal junction flyover connects the SCLR with the EEH. The flyover is 17 metres wide. The S-shaped steel girder is 92 metres long and 8.5 metres in width, and its actual cost is ₹ 59.51-76.41 crore. Access to the road is available from CST Road, Amar Mahal Junction, Nehru Nagar and Lokmanya Tilak Terminus.

There are a total of six-seven signals on the entire road, which were installed based on the suggestions of the Mumbai Traffic Police.

| Stretch | Length (km) | Details of existing road | Details of road constructed for SCLR |
Phase I (3.45 km section from Mithi River to EEH)
| Mithi River–LBS Marg | 0.650 | 4-lane concrete road | 10-lane concrete road + Flyover + Slip roads |
| LBS Marg–Old Agra Road | 0.250 | 4-lane (intermediate) concrete | Flyover + slip roads (4 Lane + 6 Lane) |
| Old Agra Road–Buddha Colony | 0.205 | 2-lane concrete road | 10 lane concrete + replacement of existing steel bridge |
| Buddha Colony–LTT | 1.095 | Virgin land | 6 lane concrete road + 6 lane RoB + Viaduct |
| LTT–Tansa Pipeline | 0.300 | 2-lane road | Viaduct |
| Tansa Pipeline–Rahul Nagar | 0.650 | Virgin land | Viaduct + 6 lane concrete road |
| Rahul Nagar–Amar Mahal Junction | 0.300 | One side carriageway | 10-lane split carriageway |
LTT Arm
| S.G. Barve Marg Junction–Kurla Dairy | 0.380 | 4 lane road | 4lane + footpath + median |
| Kurla Dairy–LTT junction | 0.420 | Virgin land | 4 lane ROB + approaches |
Phase II (3 km section from the WEH to the Mithi River)

== See also ==
- Jogeshwari–Vikhroli Link Road
