= Bhandara–Gadchiroli Expressway =

Expressway

Bhandara-Gadchiroli Expressway
- Bhandara-Gadchiroli Access Controlled Super Communication Expressway
- Expressway highlighted in red

Route information
- Maintained by MSRDC
- Length: 156 km (97 mi)
- Existed: Dec 2024 (expected)–present

Major junctions
- North end: Garada Budruk Village, Bhandara district
- South end: Madya Tukum Village, Gadchiroli district

Location
- Country: India
- States: Maharashtra
- Major cities: Bhandara,Lakhandur,Bramhapuri,Armori and Gadchiroli

Highway system
- Roads in India; Expressways; National; State; Asian

The Bhandara-Gadchiroli Expressway, officially named the Bhandara-Gadchiroli Access Controlled Super Communication Expressway, is a planned four-lane greenfield project that connects the cities of Vidarbha which are Bhandara,Lakhandur ,Bramhapuri, Armori and Gadchiroli to Mumbai-Nagpur Expressway via Nagpur-Bhandara-Gondia Expressway. Proposed as a four-lane expressway, this segment will reduce the road distance between Bhandara and Gadchiroli and bring down travel time between Gadchiroli and Bhandara further to Nagpur and Mumbai.

== Route alignment ==
The Bhandara-Gadchiroli Expressway will travel directly through Nagpur, Bhandara, Chandrapur, and Gadchiroli districts.

=== Cities and towns ===
Below are the lists of cities/towns the Bhandara-Gadchiroli Expressway will connect:

- South of Bhandara
- West of Lakhandur
- East of Bramhapuri
- South west of Armori
- North and east of Gadchiroli

== Construction ==
MSRDC had invited bids for BG-01’s construction in February 2024 with a Rs. 1854.16 crore estimate and 2.5 year construction deadline. Bids were opened in early May to reveal 4 bidders.:

Sr. No.	Package	Length in km	Contractor
1.	BG-01 (27.705 km): 0.000 to 24.705	24.705	Patel Infrastructure Ltd.

== See also ==
- Expressways in India
- Maharashtra State Road Development Corporation
- Mumbai–Nagpur Expressway
