= Lal Bahadur Shastri Marg =

Major arterial road of Mumbai connecting to the neighbouring city of Thane

- Lal Bahadur Shastri Marg marked in Red on Mumbai area map
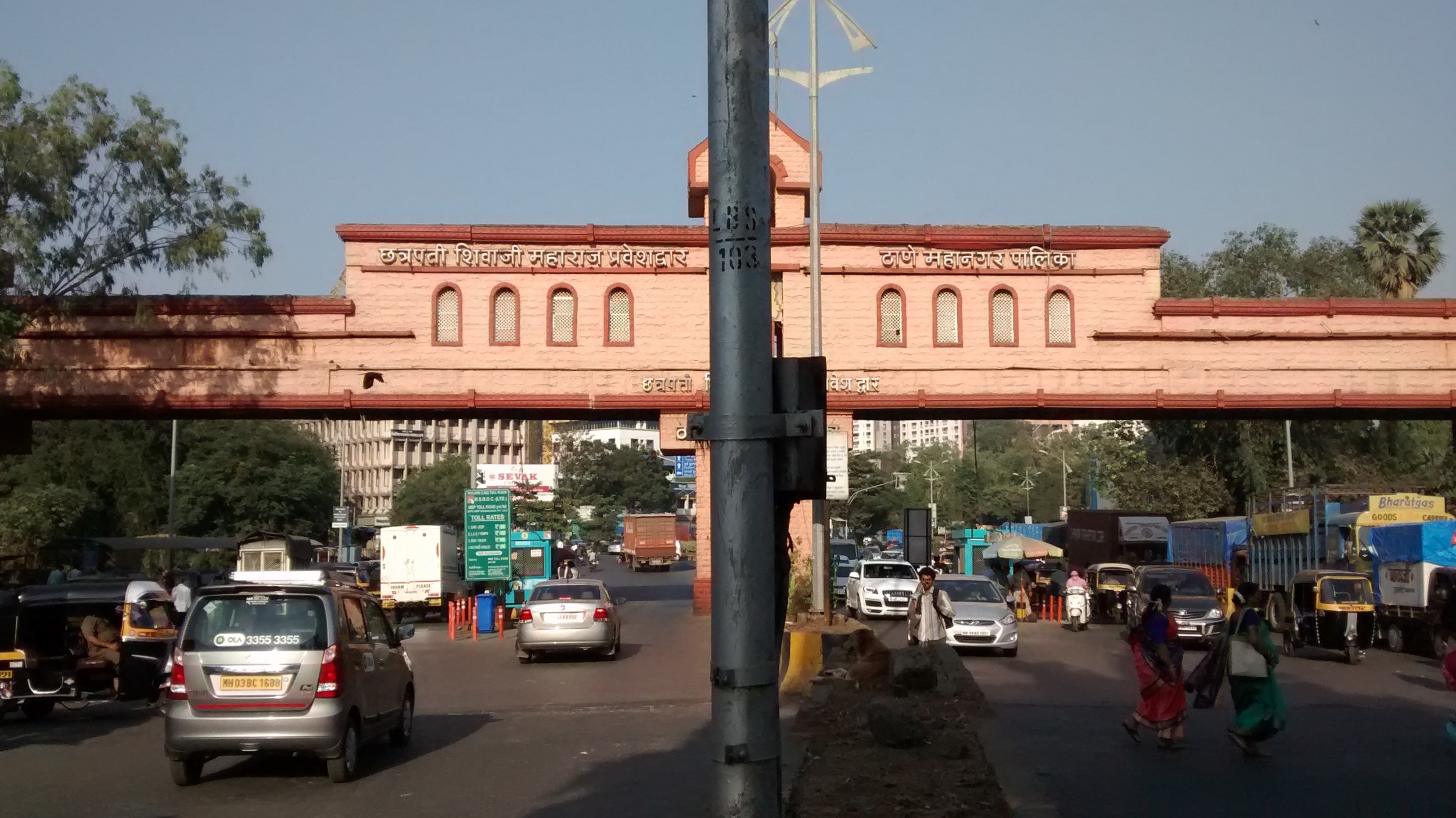
- Entrance to Thane along LBS Marg

Route information
- Maintained by Brihanmumbai Municipal Corporation, Thane Municipal Corporation
- Length: 21 km (13 mi)

Major junctions
- North end: Thane
- Marathon Chowk (Teen Haath Naka) in Thane, JVLR in Gandhi Nagar, Vikhroli; Andheri-Ghatkopar Link Road in Ghatkopar; SCLR in Kurla; BKC Road in Kurla
- South end: Sion, Mumbai

Location
- Country: India
- States: Maharashtra
- Districts: Thane, Mumbai Suburban, Mumbai City
- Major cities: Thane, Mumbai

Highway system
- Roads in India; Expressways; National; State; Asian

Lal Bahadur Shastri Marg, commonly known by its abbreviation LBS Marg, is a 21 km long, major arterial road in Suburban Mumbai connecting to the neighbouring city of Thane. It passes through the heavily populated areas of the Eastern Suburbs in Mumbai and is heavily congested. Approximately, 3 lakh vehicles, use this road daily. The road is named after Lal Bahadur Shastri, the second Prime Minister of India.

== Route description ==
LBS Marg begins at Sion and passes through all the eastern suburbs, from Kurla to Mulund. It was previously known as the Old Agra Road since it connected the city to Agra. It intersects the Eastern Express Highway (EEH) at Marathon Chowk. When travelling between Mumbai and Thane, commuters have to pay a toll. The toll gate (called the naaka in Marathi) is called Teen Hath Naaka. Both LBS Marg and the EEH pass through Thane and the Eastern Suburbs, but they pass to the west and east of the Central Line respectively. LBS Marg has only 4 lanes. However, only 2 lanes are in use now due to ongoing metro work. It passes through residential and commercial areas, making it more congested and encroached upon. On the other hand, EEH is wide, well-maintained, and smooth. It goes through an uninhabited area, where development is prohibited.

Major intersections on LBS Marg include those with the Santacruz-Chembur Link Road (SCLR) at Kurla Depot, the Andheri – Ghatkopar Link Road at Ghatkopar, and the Jogeshwari – Vikhroli Link Road (JVLR) which offer connectivity to the Western Suburbs. The road also intersects the BKC Road at Kurla, providing connectivity to the Bandra Kurla Complex, and onward to Bandra.

The upcoming Goregaon-Mulund link road (GMLR) will intersect LBS marg in Mulund. The intersection will feature a 1.89-km cable-stayed flyover and a roundabout junction.

LBS Marg is connected to Kalina from Kurla via a 6m bridge over the Mithi River. The Mumbai Metro Line 4, which will pass through LBS, is under construction.

== Planning ==
The Brihanmumbai Municipal Corporation (BMC) has had plans to widen LBS Marg since 1970. The BMC decided to revitalize and finance the project in 2012. The work would require the demolition of 2,000 buildings, 80 per cent of which were commercial properties. The BMC estimated the cost of acquiring properties for demolition to be ₹300 crore (US$35 million). The plan was to widen LBS Marg to 6 lanes (a width of 120 feet) from 4 lanes (60–80 feet in width).

In November 2025, the BMC announced plans for a flyover linking Kurla and Ghatkopar along the road. The 4240 metre long flyover will comprise four lanes, with a total width of 16.5 metres. The project is estimated to be completed in nearly four years at a cost of Rs 1,635 crore. It will begin from Kalpana Talkies in Kurla, run along the LBS Marg and land near the Pankhe Shah Dargah in Ghatkopar. The flyover will have three additional upward and downward access ramps.

== Current status ==
The LBS Road is known for heavy encroachment and almost nil enforcement of traffic and civic rules or town planning guidelines. It is common to see vehicles encroaching footpaths, wrong-side driving by all types of vehicles including heavy goods vehicles and jaywalking in the absence of pedestrian crossings. The ongoing Metro construction work on the central median has resulted in the road width reducing to just 12 feet in certain pockets, with no footpaths for pedestrian movement. As a result, the vehicular speeds on the road have fallen to an average of 3 km/h (1.8 mph) during peak hours. In addition, the road has the highest number of flood-prone spots in the Eastern suburbs, with yearly flooding a common phenomenon.

== Real Estate ==
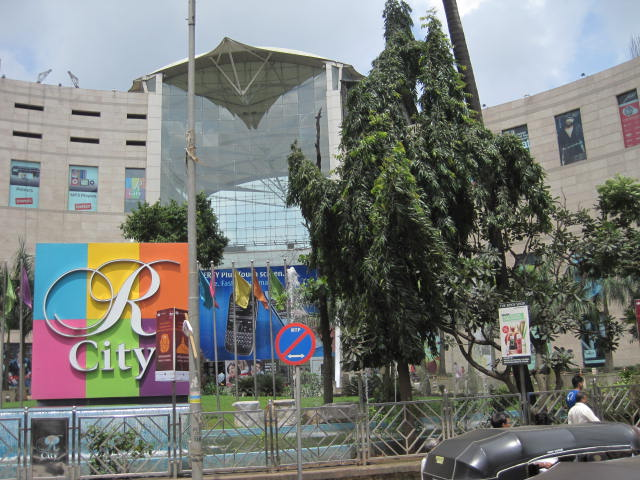
R City Mall on LBS Marg in Ghatkopar.

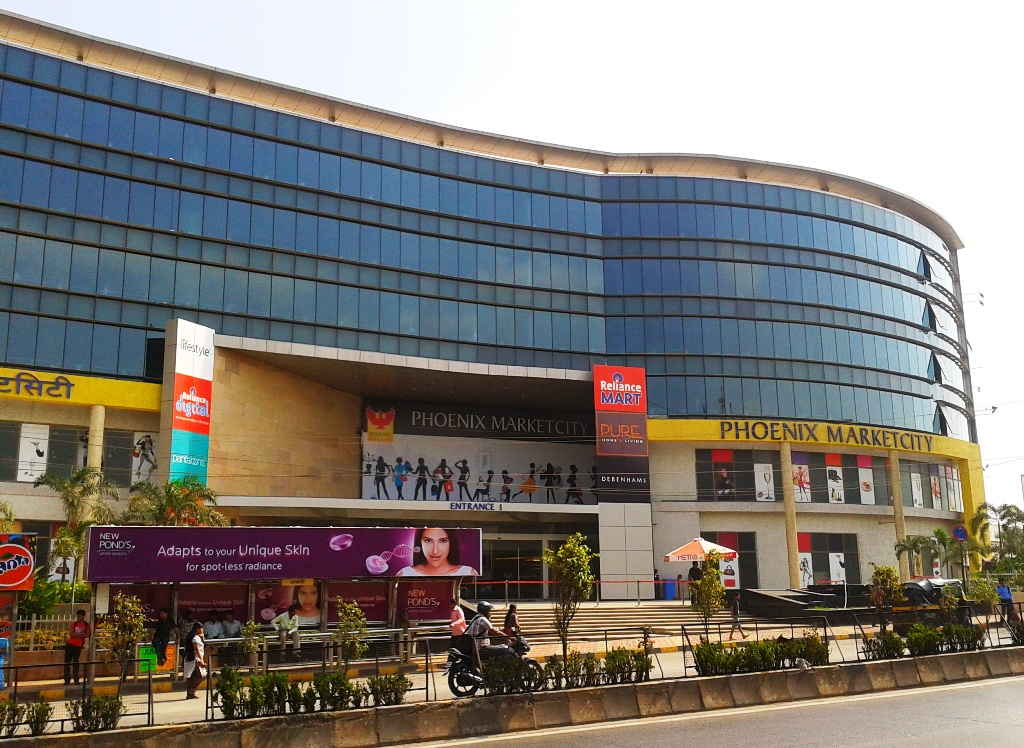
Phoenix MarketCity on LBS Marg in Kurla (West)

Conversion from primarily an industrial region to a mixed-use area began in the 2000s.

LBS Marg has several malls, apartment complexes and corporate offices along it. Some of Mumbai's most prominent malls – R-Mall (Mulund), Neptune Magnet Mall (Bhandup), R City Mall (Ghatkopar) and Phoenix Marketcity (Kurla) – are located on LBS Marg. Godrej and Boyce IT Park, located in Vikhroli, houses the offices of several IT firms. Corporates like Accenture, Capgemini, TCS, Wipro, WNS Spectramind, ICICI Prudential, HCC, Colgate-Palmolive and Cipla have offices on LBS Marg. Runwal Forests in Kanjurgmarg, Godrej Park Site and Raj Legacy in Vikhroli, Kalpataru Aura and The Address in Ghatkopar, and HDIL's Dreams and Whispering Towers in Bhandup are some notable residential complexes on LBS Marg.

Some manufacturing facilities continue to exist on or near LBS Road, notably Johnson & Johnson (Mulund), Ceat Tyres, Asian Paints and ShangriLa Biscuits (Bhandup), Jai Hind Oil Mills (Kanjurmarg), Everest Spices and Godrej Industries (Vikhroli).
