= Maharashtra State Road Development Corporation =

Public limited company fully owned by Government of Maharashtra

Maharashtra State Road Development Corporation (MSRDC)
- Native name: महाराष्ट्र राज्य रस्ते विकास महामंडळ मर्यादित
- Type: State-owned
- Industry: Expressway development; Infrastructure; Real estate development; Transport
- Predecessor: None
- Founded: July 9, 1996; 30 years ago in Mumbai, India
- Founder: Government of Maharashtra
- Headquarters: Opp. Dena Bank, Adjacent to Priyadarshini Park, Nepean Sea Road, Mumbai, Maharashtra, India, Mumbai, Maharashtra, India
- Number of locations: 7 offices
- Area served: Maharashtra
- Key people: Eknath Shinde (Chairman); Meghna Sakore Bordikar (Co-Chairwoman); Anilkumar Gaikwad (Vice Chairman & Managing Director); Rajesh Patil (Joint Managing Director (I))
- Website: msrdc.in

The Maharashtra State Road Development Corporation Limited, commonly abbreviated as MSRDC, is an Indian public limited company fully owned by the Government of Maharashtra. MSRDC was established on 9 July 1996 and incorporated as a public limited company under the Companies Act 1956 on 2 August 1996. It is responsible for developing, building and maintaining roads in Maharashtra.

MSRDC completed its 25th anniversary on 9 July 2021.

== Responsibilities and departments ==
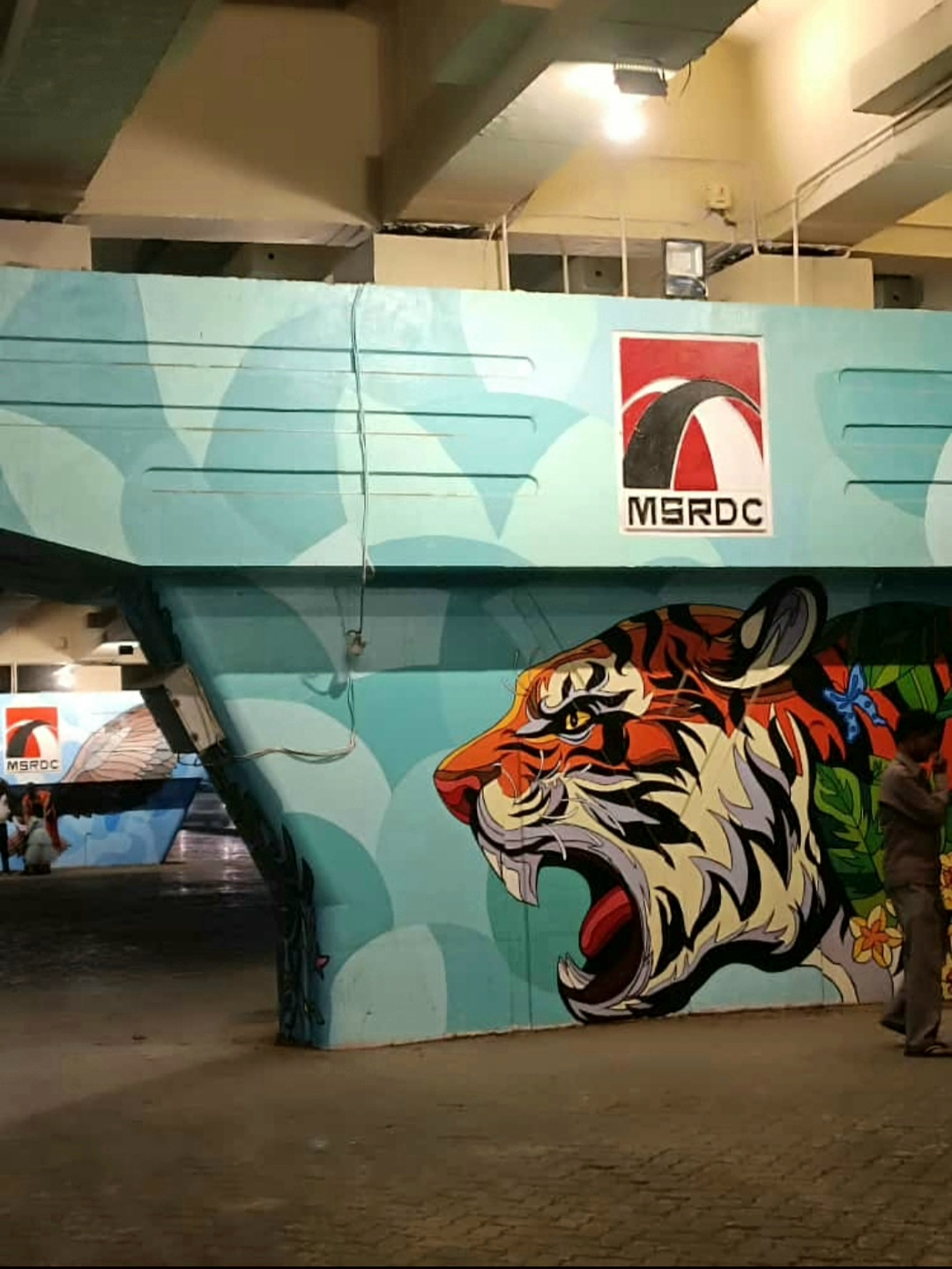
MSRDC logo on roaring tiger painting below the Seven Hills flyover in Aurangabad.

The roles and responsibilities of the MSRDC are listed as:

"MSRDC is charged with the responsibility of planning, designing, constructing and managing select road projects, flyovers, bridges, light rail transit, sea links and water transport etc. in Maharashtra and integrated road development projects in select cities of the state. It also provides roadside amenities and any other infrastructure tasks specifically assigned to it."

The MSRDC has following departments:

- Administration
- Engineering
- Toll Monitoring
- Land & Surveys
- Accounts & Finance
- Commercial
- Special Planning Authority

== Projects ==
=== Completed projects ===
- Mumbai-Pune Expressway
- Bandra-Worli Sea Link
- Airoli Bridge
- Four Laning of NH-4 stretch between Satara and Kolhapur
- 41 flyovers & allied structures in Mumbai Metropolitan Region
- Skywalks in Mumbai
- Ghodbunder Road
- Bhiwandi-Kalyan Shilphata Road
- Santa Cruz–Chembur Link Road(SCLR)
- Jogeshwari–Vikhroli Link Road(JVLR)
- IRDP-Integrated City Road Development projects
- Mumbai - Nagpur Samruddhi Expressway
- Mumbai - Pune Missing Link
- MTNL–LBS Elevated Corridor
- Thane Creek Bridge-3 (Vashi Bridge)

=== Current projects (Partially Operational) ===
- Vakola-Kurla elevated corridor

=== Under-construction Projects ===
- Integrated Road Development Projects (IRDPs) for Solapur, Latur, Pune, Aurangabad and Nagpur
- Pune Ring Road (under-construction)
- Jalna - Nanded Expressway (under-construction)
- Thane - Borivali Tunnel (under-construction)
- Versova - Bandra Sea Link (under-construction)
- Chirle-Palaspe Elevated Corridor (under-construction)
- Sewri-Worli Elevated Corridor (under-construction)

=== Future planning ===
- Pune-Nashik Industrial Expressway
- Konkan Greenfield Expressway
- Bhandara–Gadchiroli Expressway
- Nagpur–Goa Shaktipeeth Expressway
- Nagpur-Bhandara-Gondia Expressway
- Nagpur-Chandrapur Expressway
- Virar-Alibaug Multi-Modal Corridor (MMC)
- Versova–Virar Sea Link
- Versova–Dahisar Coastal Road
- Kalyan Latur Expressway
- Alternative or Second Mumbai Pune Expressway
