= Jogeshwari =

Suburb of Mumbai, India

- Locality
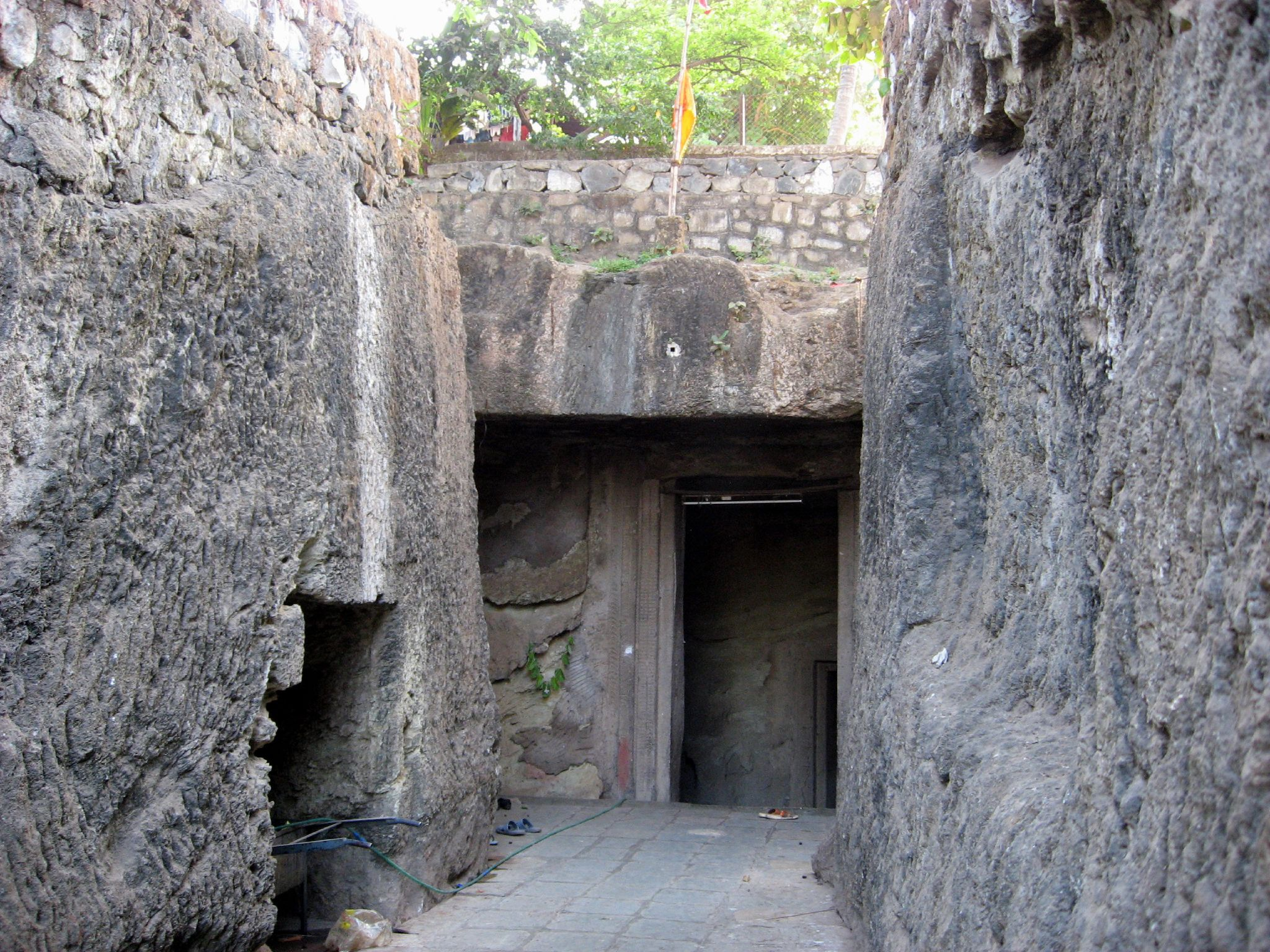
- Jogeshwari Caves entrance

- Location within Mumbai
- Coordinates: 19.12°N 72.85°E
- Country: India
- State: Maharashtra
- District: Mumbai Suburban
- City: Mumbai

Government
  - Type: Municipal Corporation
  - Body: Brihanmumbai Municipal Corporation (MCGM)

Languages
  - Official: Marathi
- Time zone: UTC+5:30 (IST)
- PIN: 400047 (West), 400060 (East), 400102 (West)
- Vehicle registration: MH-02

Jogeshwari (Pronunciation: [d͡ʒoɡeːʃʋəɾiː]) is a suburb located in the western part of Mumbai, Maharashtra, India. It is notable for Jogeshwari Caves - one of the oldest and biggest Hindu cave temples, built in approximately 5th century - particularly one containing a shrine of the Hinduism deities Jogeshwari, Shiva and Hanuman. It belongs to the K/E Ward of Mumbai.

Jogeshwari railway station and Jogeshwari East metro station serve Jogeshwari. Majas Bus Depot is also situated in Jogeshwari.

The Jogeshwari–Vikhroli Link Road connects Jogeshwari, a western suburb of Mumbai, with Vikhroli, an eastern suburb. This road typically experiences traffic jams during peak hours but has improved access and connectivity between the city's suburbs. For healthcare a public governed HBT trauma hospital is located near the Western express highway.

== Education ==
- Ismail Yusuf College of Arts, Science and Commerce, Jogeshwari (East), Mumbai.
- Mumbai Public School, Poonam Nagar
- Bal Vikas Vidya Mandir
- People's Welfare English High School
