= Vikhroli =

Vikhroli (विक्रोळी)
- suburb
- Location within Mumbai
- Coordinates: 19.11°N 72.94°E
- Country: India
- State: Maharashtra
- District: Mumbai Suburban
- City (Ward): Mumbai (S)

Government
  - Type: Municipal Corporation
  - Body: Brihanmumbai Municipal Corporation (MCGM)
  - M.L.A: Sunil Raut; Shiv Sena (UBT) (since 2014)
  - M.P.: Sanjay Dina Patil; Shiv Sena (UBT) (since 2019)

Languages
  - Official: Marathi
- Time zone: UTC+5:30 (IST)

Vikhroli (Marathi pronunciation: [ʋikʰɾoɭiː]) is a suburb of Mumbai located on the northeastern side of the city. A railway station on the Central Railway line here is named after the suburb.

Manufacturing plants of Godrej are situated at Vikhroli. It is also home to one of the largest mangrove forests in Maharashtra, India.

The name "Vikharvali" is mentioned in the 15th-17th century Marathi-language text Mahikavatichi Bakhar; the name derives from the word "vikhar" (poison).

== See also ==
- Vikhroli railway station
