= Mandapeshwar Caves =

Caves in Mumbai, India

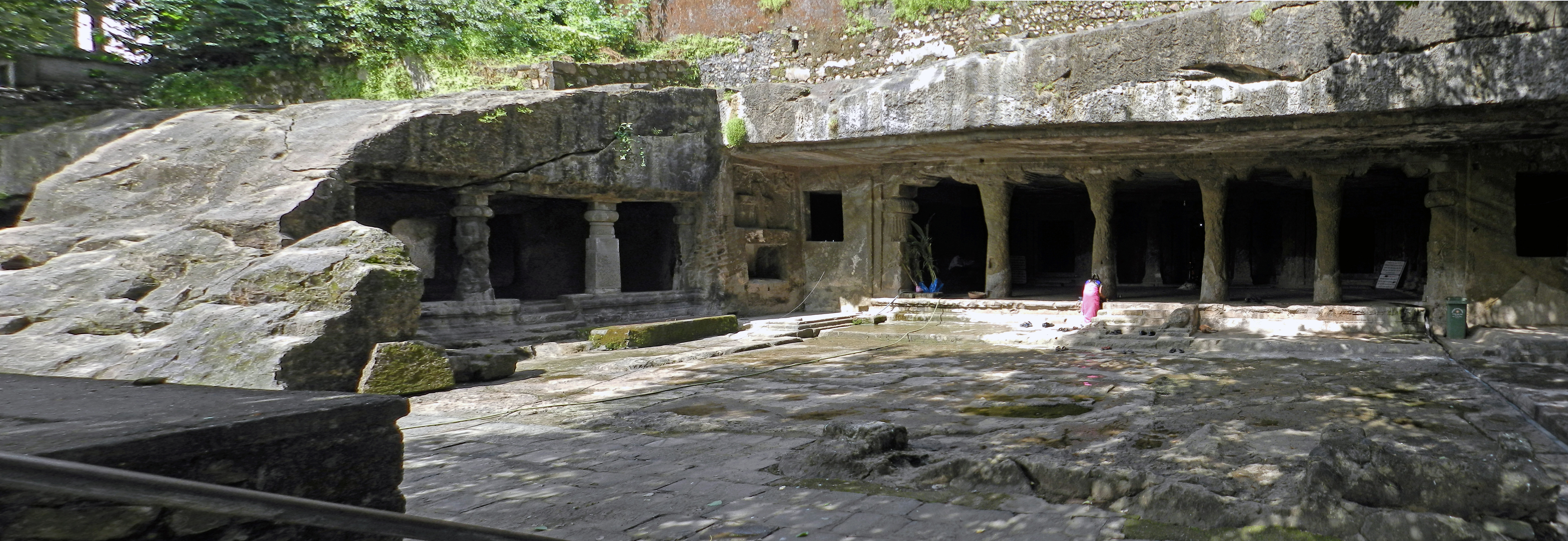
- The Mandapeshwar Cave

- Location within India
- Location: Borivali, Mumbai, Maharashtra, India
- Coordinates: 19.2451°N 72.8537°E
- Difficulty: easy

The Mandapeshwar Caves (Marathi: मंडपेश्वर गुहा) is an 8th-century rock-cut shrine dedicated to Hindu deity Shiva located near Mount Poinsur in Borivali, a suburb of Mumbai in Maharashtra, India. The caves were originally Buddhist viharas.

These 6th-century caves are located in a corner of Borivali, an otherwise northern suburb of Mumbai.

== Location ==
The caves are situated in Mount Poinsur, Borivali, a suburb of Mumbai. Originally, the caves were on the banks of the Dahisar River, but later the course of the river changed. The name of the neighbourhood was derived from this temple. It is believed that the name of Mount Poinsur, on which the Saint Francis D'Assisi High School is situated, is a corruption of the name "Mandapeshwar". The Mandapeshwar caves are smaller and lesser known as compared to the Kanheri Caves in the Sanjay Gandhi National Park in Borivali East. The ruins of an old Portuguese-built church stand on top of the caves. The Immaculate Conception Church is located to its south end. There is an open ground in front of the caves which is used as a playground and parking area by people from the slum in front of it. The Swami Vivekanand Road runs in front of this cave.

== Gallery ==
Mandapeshwar Caves

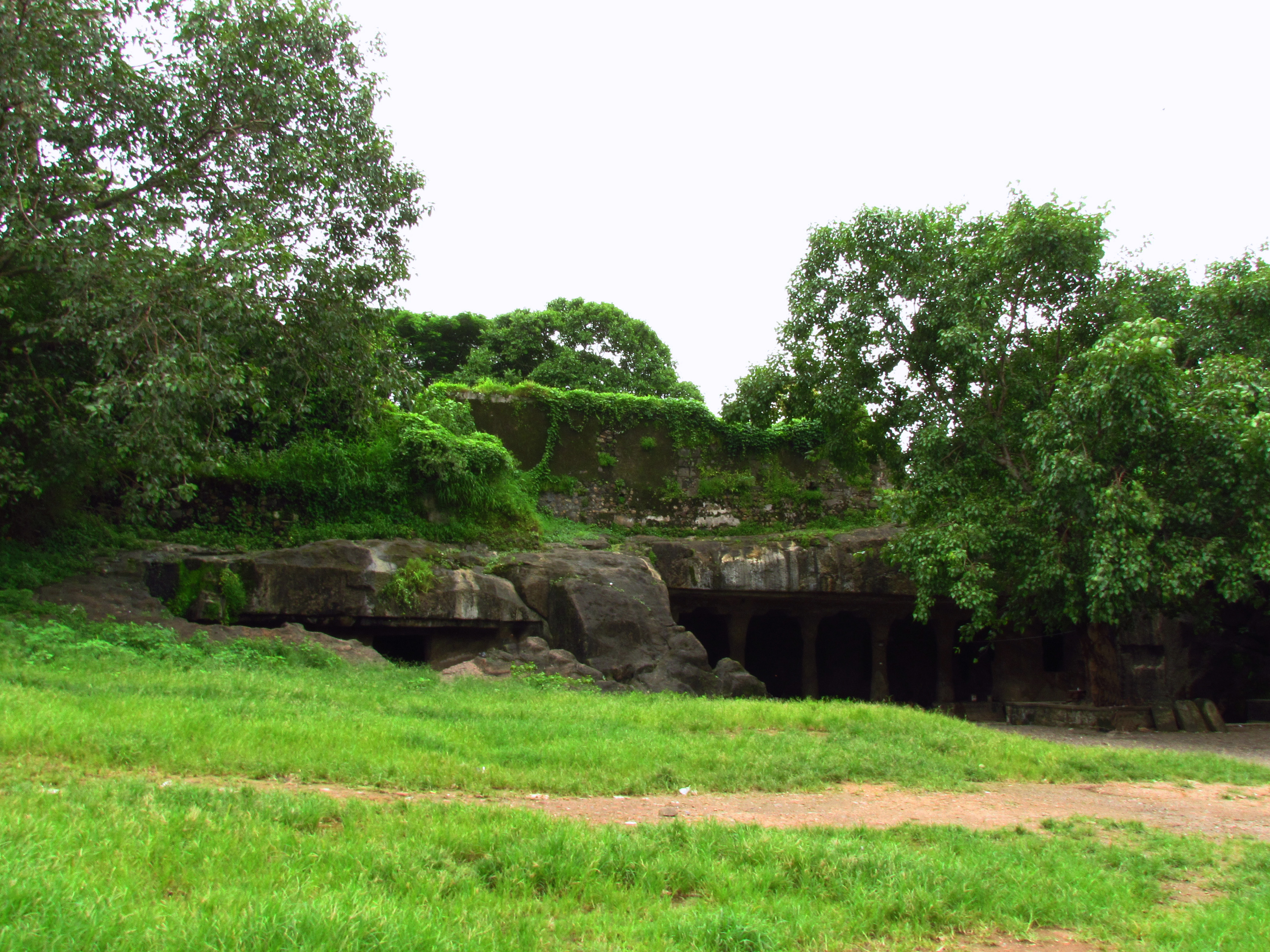
Outside view

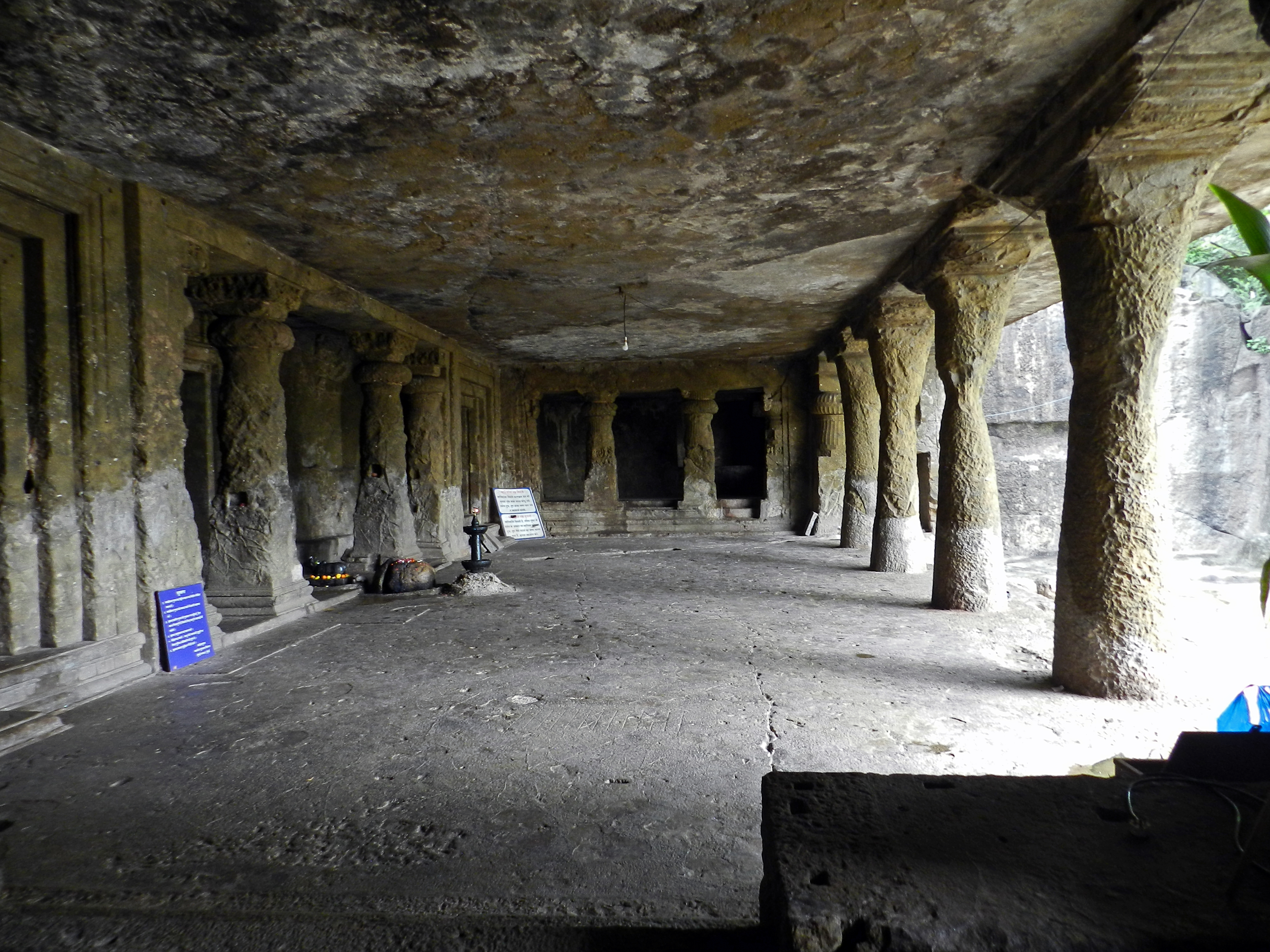
Portico

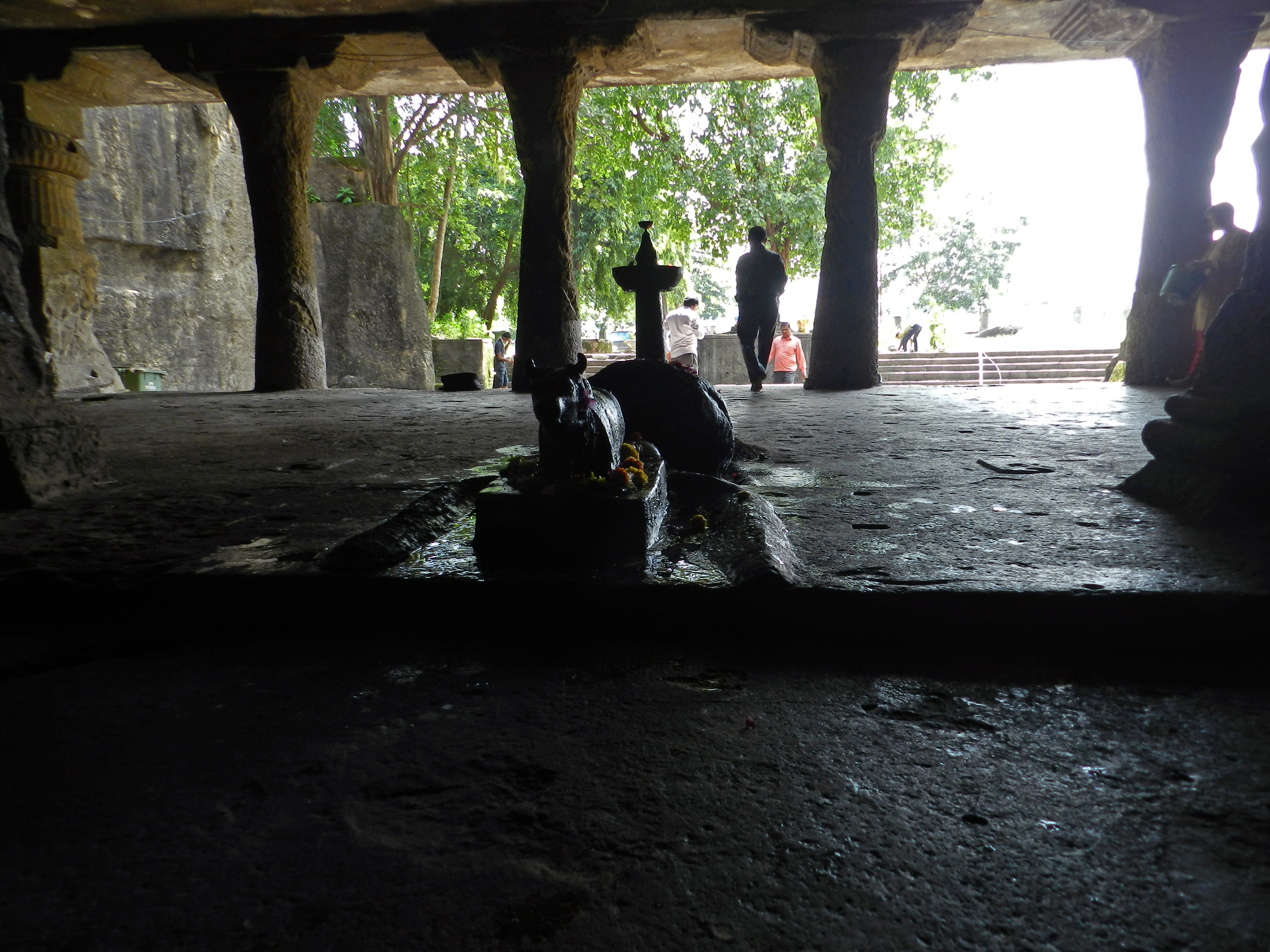
View from the inside

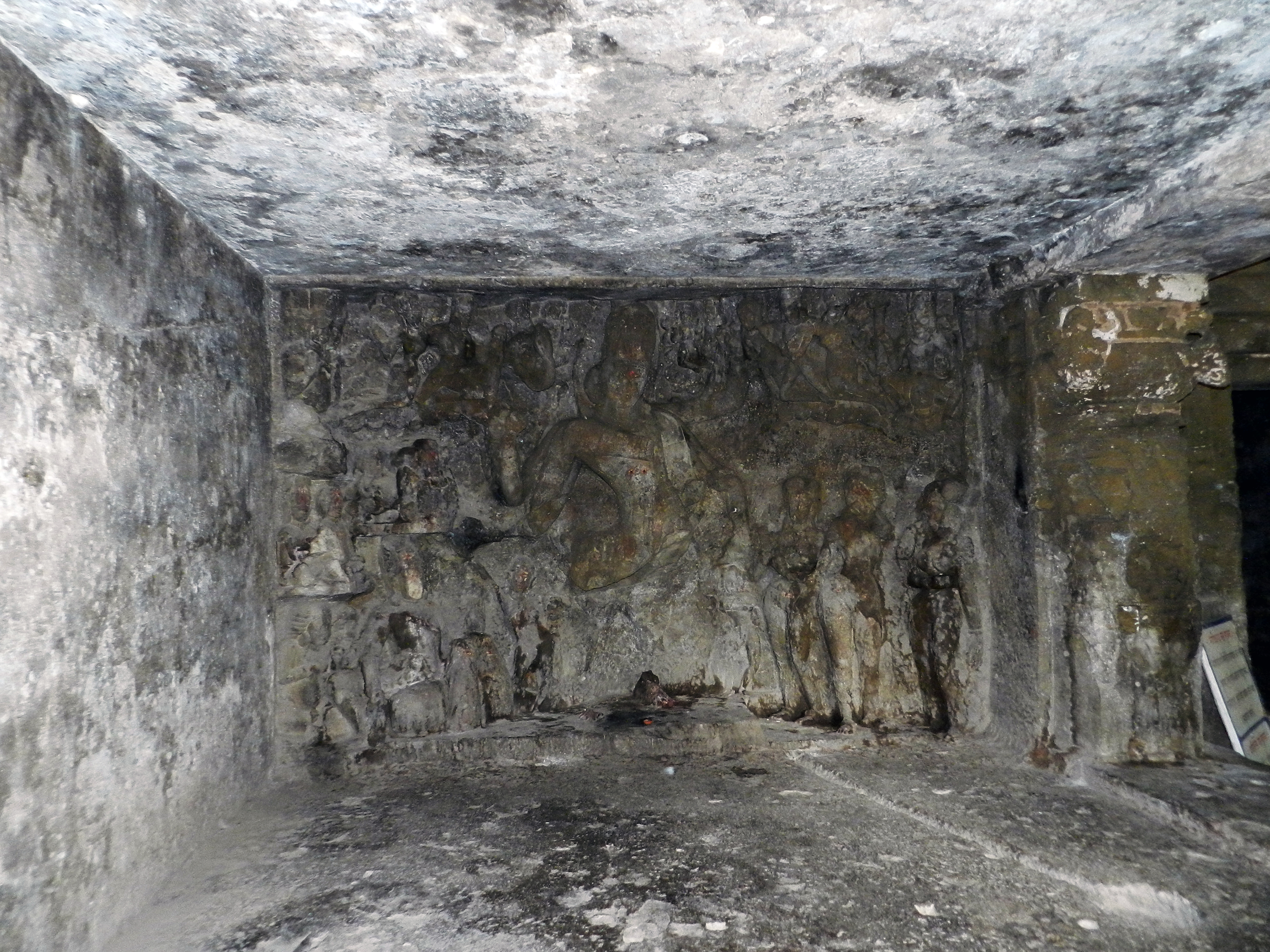
Inside the caves

== Etymology ==
The name of the cave Mandapeshwar means Ishwar (lord) of the Mandap (hall).

== History ==
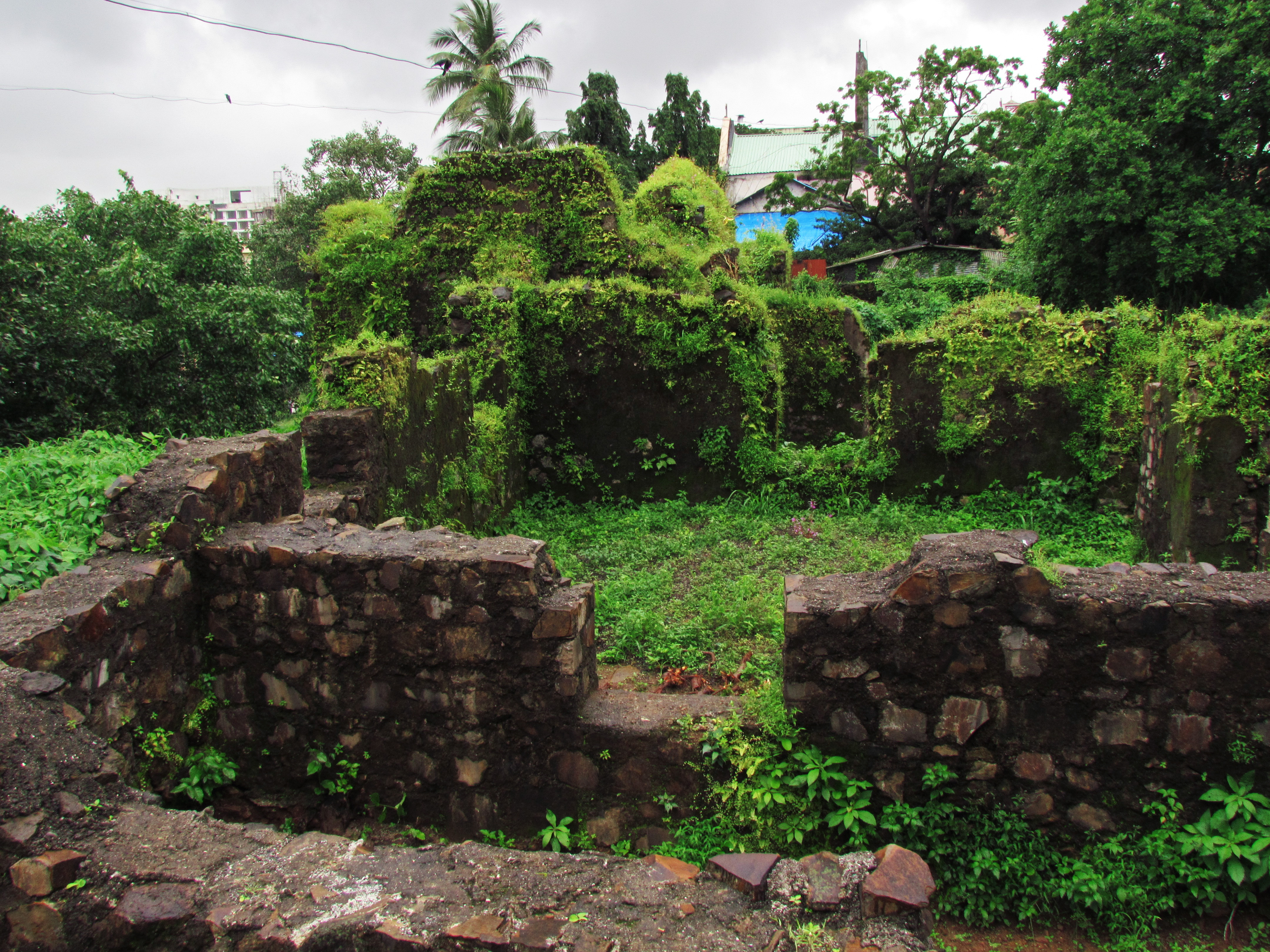
The ruins over the caves

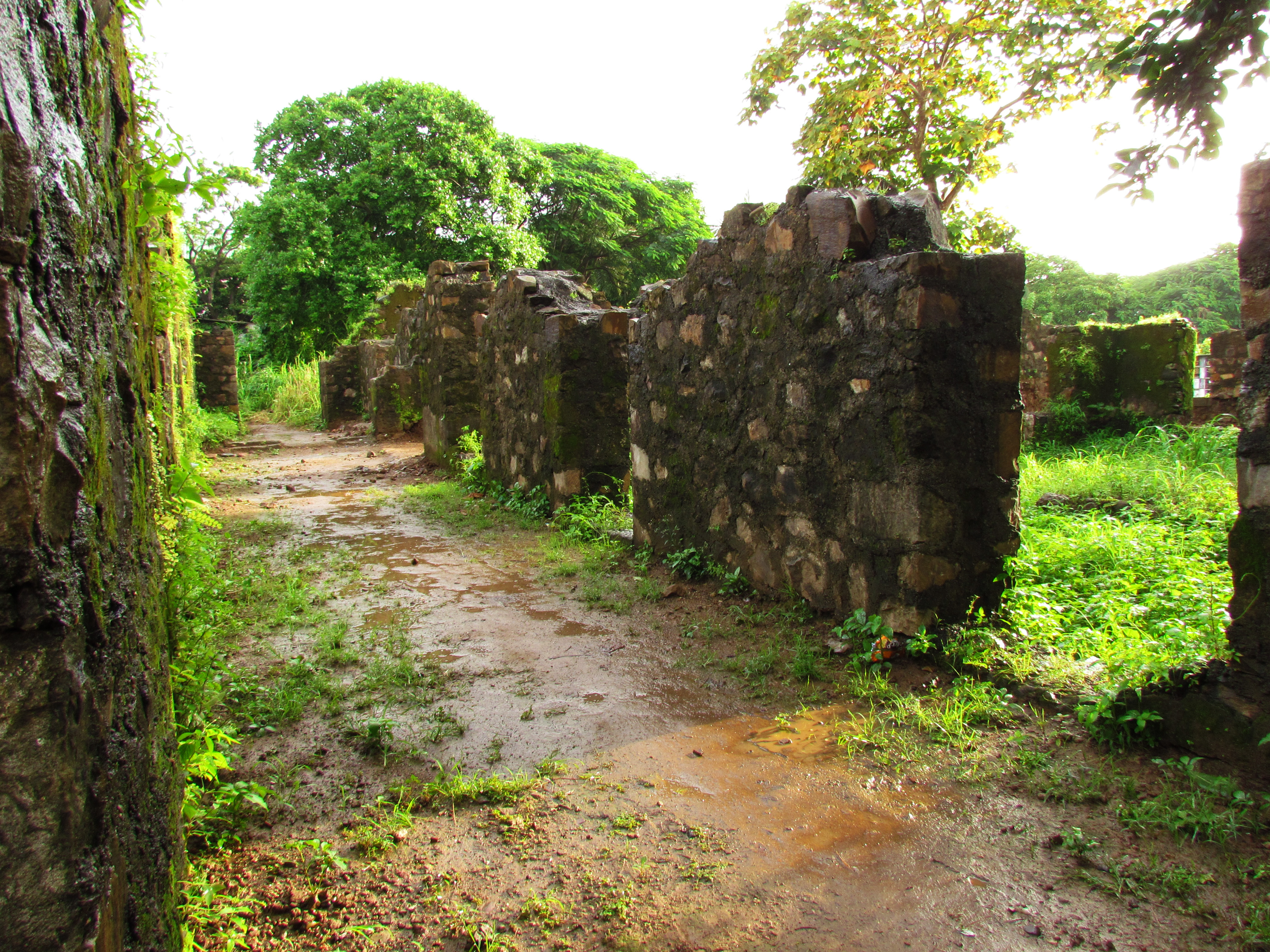
A passageway within the ruins

The caves are believed to have been built approximately 1,500 to 1,600 years ago, nearly around the same time as the Jogeshwari caves (which were built between 520-550 CE).

The caves were originally cut by Buddhist monks. Most of the early rock-cut temples and rock-art in India were created by Buddhist monks. The monks were the missionaries of the revolutionary message of the Buddha, and the best places to spread the new message where the nodes of trade routes. Maharashtra and many of its hills in the Western Ghats fit their purpose. The monks would dig out prayer halls or chaitya-grihas in the caves, while building votive stupas and dwelling places for themselves. Here, they would meditate and influence the passing traders and anyone else who happened by. The hills around Mumbai were at the juncture of the sea trade routes. During the occupation of the Kanheri caves, the Buddhist monks found another location where they created a hall of paintings. The cave was created by the Buddhist monks, and then they hired travelling Persians to paint.

The sculptures in these caves are estimated to have been carved out at the same period as of those seen in the Jogeshwari Caves. It contained the largest Mandapa and a prominent Garbagriha.

This cave has seen through time, World war (when the soldiers used it), General people used to stay, Initial Portuguese used it as a place of prayer. These caves were witness to a series of invasions in the surrounding areas by different rulers and each time the caves were used for a different reason, sometimes even for things like housing by the armies or sometimes by refugees. During this period the monolithic paintings were defaced. After the invasion of the marathas in this area in the year 1739, for years the area was deserted.

Somewhere in time the caves were again discovered, it was under the protection of Indian Archaeology Society.

Most of what can be seen on the walls now are destroyed remains. The church (IC Church) and its graveyard are situated above the cave precincts. There are ruins of an old structure above the caves. These ruins belonged to a much older church built in 1544. This ruins is also under protection of Indian Archaeology Society.

There are four rock-cut shrines in Mumbai: Elephanta Caves, Jogeshwari Caves, Mahakali Caves, Mandapeshwar Caves. All four caves have the same sculptures. The sculptures at Mandapeshwar were created beginning in the late Gupta Empire, or some time after. Elephanta Island was designated a UNESCO World Heritage Site in 1987 to preserve the artwork.

Mandpeshwer caves have sculptures of Nataraja, Sadashiva and a sculpture of Ardhanarishvara. It also has Ganesha, Brahma and Vishnu statuettes. These works depicted the mythical tales of the Hindu gods and goddesses. Even today an elaborate sculpture representing the marriage of Shiva with Parvati may be viewed from the large square window at the south end of these caves. The caves are declared as an archaeological heritage site and therefore are protected under law.
