= Saint Francis D'Assisi High School =

St. Francis D'Assisi High School (SFHS)
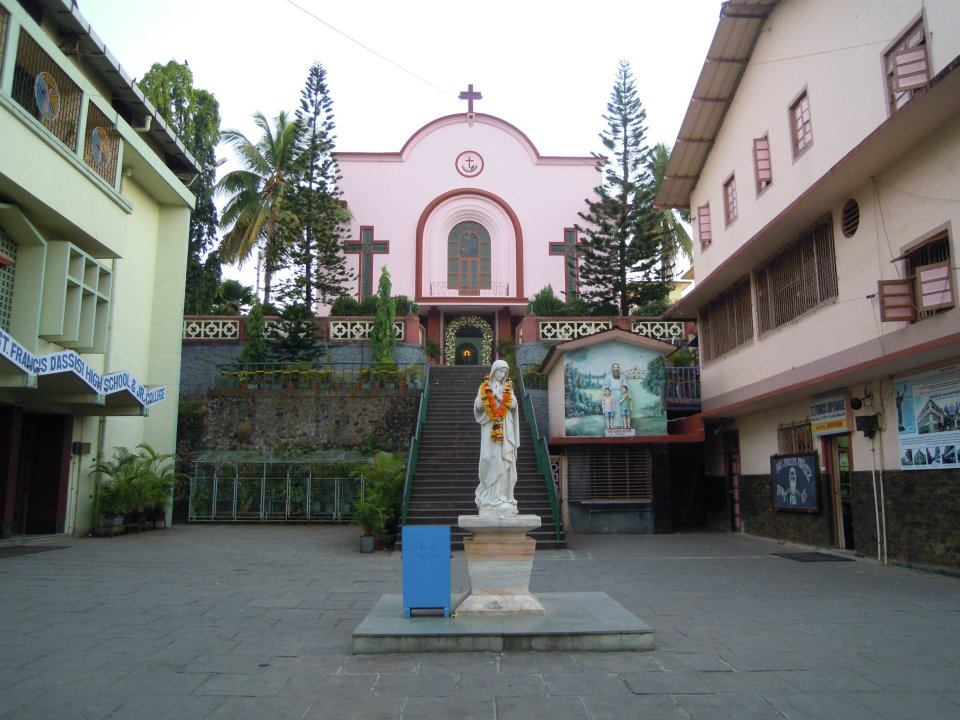
- The iconic St. Francis Chapel

Location
- Mount Poinsur, SVP Road; Borivali West; Mumbai, Maharashtra; India
- Coordinates: 19.244136°N 72.853126°E

Information
- School type: Government Aided, Private secondary
- Motto: "Love And Service"
- Religious affiliation: Christian
- Denomination: Roman Catholic
- Patron saint: St. Francis of Assisi
- Established: 1908
- Founder: Paulus Moritz
- Status: Open
- School board: Maharashtra State Board of Secondary and Higher Secondary Education; ICSE
- School district: Mumbai Suburban
- Oversight: Franciscan Missionary Brothers
- School code: 1503
- Principal: Rev. Bro. Backyanathan
- Head of school: Principal
- Teaching staff: 70+
- Grades: 1-10
- Gender: Co-ed
- Average class size: 80
- Language: English
- Hours in school day: 6
- Campus: Hill top
- Campus size: 30 acres
- Campus type: Urban
- Colours: Blue and white
- Sports: Football, cricket, basketball, field hockey
- Nickname: Assisian

Saint Francis D'Assisi High School is a school for boys located in IC Colony, Borivali West, Mumbai, India.

== Overview ==
The school is managed by the Franciscan Missionary Brothers, a Catholic religious society founded by Paulus Moritz, a German missionary. The school is recognized by the State Government of Maharashtra. It was established in 1908 and it is one of the largest high schools in Maharashtra, India.

In 2023, the Principal is Brother Backyanathan.

In 2023, the high school has 8,000 students from Standards 1 to 10. The school is affiliated with the Council of Indian School Certificate Examinations (CISCE) and the Maharashtra Board of Secondary and Higher Secondary Education. The school follows the SSC curriculum.

The school holds minority status and preference is given to children belonging to the Catholic minority community of the area.

The school is located on Mt. Poinsur, with a chapel located on the summit of the hill. It has two open air grounds on campus used for school assemblies, wedding ceremonies, cultural programs and movie shoots, as well as a 5-acre playground adjoining the adjacent Our Lady of Immaculate Conception Church, Mt. Poinsur.

As well as the high school and junior college, there is also a boarding school on campus. The school also runs an orphanage/residential institution for homeless children.

The institute also runs an engineering college under the University of Mumbai and a management wing affiliated to Yashwantrao Chavan Open University.

== History ==
The history of St. Francis D'Assisi School and Orphanage dates back to 1908. Sebastian Pereira, Archbishop of Daman, who had his see at Colaba, Bombay and knew the Franciscan Missionary Brothers, visited Paulus-Moritz, Superior General of the CMSF to start an apostolic activity for the welfare of poor children of the Diocese of Bombay. He selected the location at Mt. Poinsur (known then as Mandpeshwar). Mortiz took up residence in the balcony of the run-down church of the Immaculate Conception on 4 October 1908.

St. Francis Junior College was established in 1975. The college offers classes in Science and Business and these are taught in the English language.

In 1985 when the school had completed 75 years Giani Zail Singh, the then President of India, attended the celebrations. Saint Francis D'Assisi had its centenary celebrations in 2008 attended by former President of India, A.P.J. Abdul Kalam.

In 2008 the college became co-educational. The college now follows the ICSE curriculum.

== See also ==
- List of schools in Mumbai
