= Antonius Maria Bodewig =

German Catholic Priest

Antonius Maria Bodewig (2 November 1839 – 8 January 1915) was a German Catholic Priest. He is the founder of the Missionary Sisters of the Queen of the Apostles. He is known for promoting inculturation of the Catholic liturgy.

== Life ==
Bodewig was born on 2 November 1839 in Cologne, Germany, to Constantine and Elisabeth Bodewig. He entered the Society of Jesus in Münster on 21 August 1856, and took his vows in 1858. After noviciate, Bodewig studied philosophy at Aachen from 1861 to 1863, and had a language course from 1864 at the University of Bonn. From 1869 to 1872, he taught at Stella Matutina College in Feldkirch, Austria.

Bodewig was ordained a priest on 3 May 1871 at Maria Laach by Bishop Matthias Eberhard. He completed his theological studies in 1872 at Maria Laach, and he began his apostolate with the Bombay-Pune Mission in India. He reportedly spoke up to 17 languages.

== Career ==
Bodewig was influenced by Bishop Leo Meurin. In 1879, he registered to learn Sanskrit, Marathi, English language, Indian philosophy, and mythology. His studies was cut short when he was sent to serve at Igatpuri.

=== Robert de Nobili ===
Nobili, an Italian Jesuit, had arrived in Madurai, South India in November 1606. He soon realised that the lack of success in the missions was due to the great differences in culture between European and Indian people. De Nobili understood that Western cultural standards of dress and behaviour are distinct from the core teachings of the gospel. For instance, eating beef, drinking alcohol, infrequent bathing and entering holy places with shoes on were considered barbarous and filthy by the indigenous people. De Nobili installed himself as a Hindu Sannyasi in a simple house of his own where he began to study Tamil and later Telugu and Sanskrit. His converts continued to wear Indian clothing and retain the traditional sandalwood ashes on their forehead – anything not connected with any religious tenet may be regarded as forms of Indian culture.

De Nobili met with strong opposition although his method was approved by Pope Gregory XV in 1623, with certain provisions.

=== The Igatpuri Experiment ===
On his arrival at Igatpuri, Fr Bodewig began an ashram way of life as recommended by Bishop Meurin, becoming a strict vegetarian, which he found difficult. However, there were no high caste Hindus in Igatpuri and Bodewig's radical way of life divided local Christians. From Igatpuri, he moved to Nasik but met with little success.

Recalled to Bombay, Fr Bodewig taught at St Xavier's College in March 1875 and was asked to edit the newly formed periodical of the Bombay Debating Club, a pet project of the bishop. When this subsequently failed, Bodewig, jobless, was moved to Deolali, near Igatpuri, as a military chaplain. The mercurial Bishop Meurin then recalled Bodewig and asked him to prepare lectures for the Bombay Debating Club which he himself gave, giving no credit to Bodewig. By September 1875 relations between the two had reached breaking point and Bodewig returned to Europe in 1876.

=== The Break with the Jesuits ===
Between 1876 and 1888 Bodewig was transferred from one country to another. Frustrated by his experiences in India, he determined to initiate a concrete plan for the conversion of India via the ideas of De Nobili. The Jesuits, however, wanted him to teach in their schools and an impasse was reached. Bodewig was sent to North America and told to forget all ideas about India. Finally, in frustration, Bodewig left the Society of Jesus and moved to the Archdiocese of Cologne as a diocesan priest.

Working as an assistant priest, Fr Bodewig began to formulate ideas about a new missionary society for the conversion of India. He published Indien und Seine Heiden Missionen ("India and its Pagan Missions") in which he laid down his ideas for evangelising India. A gifted speaker, he began to lecture and publish widely, and soon gained a dedicated group of followers. At the time of his break with the Society of Jesus, Fr Bodewig had a spiritual experience while saying Mass. It seemed to him that the sky was covered by thick black clouds obscuring everything from sight. He took this to mean that his path would henceforth be difficult and full of personal pain. This was to be the price for his vision of an Indian mission, and so Fr Bodewig accepted it.

The year 1888 was also the date of a papal encyclical exhorting the Brazilian bishops to oppose slavery in South America. The 37th German Catholic Congress passed several resolutions urging the German government to reject slavery in its African colonies. Archbishop Philipp Krementz took up the matter with zeal in the Archdiocese of Cologne. He looked for missionaries to send to Africa to fight against the slave trade and his eye fell on Fr Bodewig's group. When he instructed them to focus on Africa, Fr Bodewig refused. As India was a British colony and Germany had colonies in Africa, there was some logic to Krementz' view. Fr Bodewig was increasingly regarded as eccentric and a loose canon.

=== Early Success ===
On 1 September 1892 Fr Bodewig was released from pastoral ministry and founded a small community of enthusiastic young men in Cologne. The Archbishop raised no objection and soon the group expanded to include a community of young women who provided for themselves by nursing the sick of the town, with a view to eventual mission work in India. A second similar house of sisters was set up in 1893 in Munich. In 1894 Fr Bodewig went to Rome to obtain Vatican approval of his new society and publicly lectured about India and his ideas for a mission. Greatly encouraged by a letter of commendation from Cardinal Ledóchowski of Propaganda Fide and the approval of other prominent churchmen he returned to Cologne.

Bodewig was a guest speaker at the German Catholic Congress at Cologne on 30 September 1894. In his speech he presented his Missionary Society of the Immaculate Conception for the Conversion of Pagan India. After his speech the proposal was accepted unanimously: "The 41st General Assembly will bring to the knowledge of German Catholics the Missionary Society for India". However, Rome had given no definite approval and news of Bodewig's independent actions reached Archbishop Philipp Krementz of Cologne who felt that his authority had been undermined. He may also have been offended that the second edition of Fr Bodewig's book appeared without his imprimatur.

=== Setbacks and dark clouds ===
Bodewig was to pay dearly for having offended Krementz. He was branded insubordinate and rebellious and ordered to give up his work for the Indian mission, which he refused to do. Accordingly, Card. Krementz suspended Bodewig a divinis, forbidding him to exercise his priestly ministries until the matter could be settled.

Archbishop Krementz followed this by informing the Holy See of his actions, thus closing all doors in Rome to Fr Bodewig. There ensued a whispering campaign against Fr Bodewig alleging, among other things, that he had obtained money fraudulently. His bank account was frozen, denying him access. Disgruntled ex-members of the society were encouraged to make allegations that are not now possible to verify.

=== The Wilderness Years ===
Fr Bodewig could no longer remain in Cologne and moved his members to Munich, planning eventually to settle in Belgium. In December 1895, fourteen sisters and eight brothers left for the mission in Dacca and Lahore, arriving penniless to hear that their group was not recognised and they must return home or join other congregations. Archbishop Krementz, working through the Holy See, ensured that ecclesiastical authorities were prejudiced against Fr Bodewig in advance. The Belgian Archbishop of Mechelen ordered that the sacraments be denied to Fr Bodewig and his group.

Bodewig's group now had no funds and no supporters in the hierarchy. They were to remain six more years in the wilderness. In 1896 Pope Leo XIII dissolved the society. At this point Paulus Moritz, Fr Bodewig's right-hand man, reluctantly left and joined the Indian Mission as a Franciscan.

Unable to function as an approved society, the group moved to Belgium and lived in common as private persons. Cardinal Krementz died in 1899 but it would be some years before the tide of opinion would change. A visit and petition to Rome in 1901 was unsuccessful, the group changed its name to 'Philanthropic Association of the White Star'. By 1910 there were 18 brothers and 85 sisters living in five houses.

=== The Tide Turns; Death of Fr Bodewig ===
Renewed attempts to gain official recognition met with limited success. Slowly, with the aid of Count Sacconi and Sister Xaveria Blas acting as mediators, the official attitude against Fr Bodewig began to soften. Many bishops were tacitly sympathetic but dared not give active support.

Finally in December 1913, Cardinal Mercier of Mechelen accepted Fr Bodewig into his archdiocese and lifted all suspensions from him and his group. Full of joy, Fr Bodewig renewed plans for an audience with the Pope and the chance to re-establish a Missionary Society. Pope Pius X was reputed to be very favourable but again things were stalled by the outbreak of World War 1 and the death of the Pope on 20 August 1914. The Belgian authorities seized the group's house and land and ordered the deportation of the group. Fr Bodewig, now in poor health, went to the Netherlands.

The group was scattered for a while, but some of the sisters reached Vienna, where the future mother house would be established. The next Pope, Benedict XV, agreed to meet Fr Bodewig in January 1915. The journey was too much for the increasingly frail Fr Bodewig and he died in Rome on the eve of the scheduled audience.

=== The Aftermath ===
The members of Fr Bodewig's society were scattered in different parts of Europe until the end of the War. Some lived in convents, some with private families; many tended sick and wounded soldiers.

In the early years of the Missionary Sisters of the Queen of Apostles, the founder's name was hardly known, on account of his troubles with church authorities. It was to be the work of his followers, Paul Sonntag in association with Cardinal Theodor Innizer of Vienna and Mother Xaveria Blas, to establish the order and fulfil the dream of Fr Bodewig.

== Vision of Fr Bodewig ==
In Fr Bodewig's day, Roman Catholic missionaries were priests and the gospel was introduced in the context of western ways of worship and culture. Portuguese influence was strong in India due to an early papal decree that all mission territories would be under Portuguese control.

Fr Bodewig, influenced by Bishop Meurin and Robert de Nobili, understood that India has a deeply spiritual heritage and a very different cultural and religious expression. He felt that missionary priests should be supported by religious brothers as well as nuns who could relate directly to Indian women, especially as the higher caste ones lived in seclusion and apart from men. There was to be a particular focus on women who had very few rights at the time – incidence of widow burning and child brides were commonplace for instance. Fr Bodewig believed in what came to be known as inculturation – focusing on the gospel in the light of St Paul's advice to 'be all things to all men'. Christ was a Jew and early Christians were Jews, and the connection with European culture was a later adaptation. Fr Bodewig said: "An Indian culture and an Indian world are the gifts we want to give to the Church and to the Lord, the King of Love, to dedicate and lay at his feet, the gifts of the Orient".

Despite his radical views on evangelization, Fr Bodewig's faith was traditional; he had a devotion to the Virgin Mary and to the Sacred Heart of Jesus. His chief influence was perhaps St Ignatius of Loyola, the founder of the Jesuits, the order Fr Bodewig belonged to for over thirty years: all things for the greater glory of God.

Fr Bodewig's vow in 1908 to build a worthy temple in Benares in honour of the Virgin Mary was not realised until 1992, the Archdiocese of Cologne being instrumental in achieving this.

If Fr Bodewig's vision was not realised quite in the way he would have wished, he is nevertheless regarded as the spiritual founder of two religious organisations: The Congregation of the Missionary Brothers of St Francis of Assisi (founded by co-worker Paul Moritz) and the Missionary Sisters of Queen of Apostles.

"As to myself, I have long ago given up all other endeavours and concerns and devoted myself wholly with all that I am and have and can to the apostolic end of working for the evangelisation of India, in particular, Benares."

== Character of Fr Bodewig ==
In life, Fr Bodewig was said to be capable of stirring very different feelings in people. Extremely intelligent and a born communicator, Antonius Bodewig was single-minded, passionate and energetic in everything he did. There was undoubtedly a streak of stubbornness which prevented him from handling authority well, though towards the end of his life, Sr Xaveria Blas, an associate, was able to smooth his relations with authority, and also, perhaps, to encourage his religious superiors to appreciate his value. Bodewig attracted devoted followers even at the time when he was out of favour with Church authorities and his appealing and inspirational personality is still felt today. His portrait hangs in all the convents of the Sisters of the Queen of Apostles.

As a motivator he was able to use his gifts of speaking to powerful effect, a possible reason why the Jesuits wanted him to remain teaching in their schools. Fr Paul Sonntag, in his memoirs, tells that as a young man considering a vocation he attended a fascinating lecture about India which caused him to decide then and there to become a missionary. From other information, it is almost certain that the speaker was Fr Bodewig, who, in his haste to continue his lecture tour, left before the younger man could speak to him. Fr Sonntag would later edit the journal Licht und Liebe ('Light and Life') which promulgated Fr Bodewig's ideals and he was eventually able to fulfil Fr Bodewig's dream of founding a missionary order dedicated to being "Indians to Indians".
