= Thane–Borivali Twin Tunnel =

Infrastructure project in Maharashtra, India

The Thane–Borivali Twin Tunnel is an under-construction road tunnel project in the Mumbai Metropolitan Region in Maharashtra, India. It is intended to connect Thane and Borivali through a road link running beneath Sanjay Gandhi National Park.

The project has received significant coverage in Indian news media because of its scale, the proposed objective of easing traffic congestion, reducing travel time, its route beneath protected forest land, related environmental concerns, and subsequent construction activity.

== Route and design ==
The project consists of a twin-tube road tunnel linking Ghodbunder Road in Thane with the Western Express Highway in Borivali.The project length is expected to be about 11.84 km, with a substantial section of the alignment passing underground beneath Sanjay Gandhi National Park. The tunnels will be constructed using 2 Tunnel boring machines. It is considered the first instance of tunnels being dug under an environmentally protected area anywhere in India

The road will have two tunnels of diameter 12.2 meters each and the tunnels will be of a length of 10.25 kms. Each tunnel will have 2 lanes and 1 emergency lane. There will be a cross-connection lane every 300 meters.

== History ==
The tunnel project received public attention during 2023 and 2024 as legal, environmental and administrative developments were reported in the press.

The contract was awarded to Megha Engineering and Infrastructure Limited. In May 2023, the Bombay High Court dismissed petitions filed by Larsen & Toubro challenging the rejection of its bids relating to packages of the project.

In October 2023 and February 2024, Indian news reports stated that the project received wildlife-related approvals from the Maharashtra State Board for Wildlife and the National Board for Wildlife.

In July 2024, Prime Minister Narendra Modi laid the foundation stone for the project during a visit to Mumbai.

== Environmental concerns ==
The project has attracted scrutiny because its alignment passes beneath Sanjay Gandhi National Park.

In June 2023, Hindustan Times reported that an ecological survey identified 18 highly protected species along the alignment and that some experts had criticised the survey's conclusions on impact assessment.

A 2024 report by IndiaSpend said environmentalists had raised concerns regarding biodiversity, aquifers, geology and the overall ecological effect of the tunnel works beneath the park.

== Construction progress ==
By early 2025, news reports indicated that rehabilitation housing had been allotted for families affected by the project on the Borivali side.

In February 2026, The Indian Express reported that more than 500 structures had been cleared in Borivali for work related to the launch shaft for a tunnel boring machine.

In December 2025 and April 2026, The Indian Express reported milestones relating to the deployment of a tunnel boring machine named Nayak for excavation work on the project with a second tunnel boring machine Arjuna being assembled.

In April 2026, reports suggested that the MMRDA will start evicting the last of the residents on the Borivali side of the tunnel, at the suburb known as Magathane. This is significant as it was considered to be the final obstacle for the smooth construction of the project. The eviction was considered necessary after outreach from MMRDA officials for the rehabilitations of various such residents, also known as Project Affected Persons, was spurned or not responded to.

== See also ==
- Mumbai Metropolitan Region
- Sanjay Gandhi National Park
- Road tunnel
