= Paulus Moritz =

Paulus Moritz (29 June 1869 – 19 November 1942) was a German Roman Catholic cleric and founder of a minor branch of the Franciscan order. Moritz was born in Königsberg, Prussia, to Jewish parents and was named Heymann Hermann Moritz. He received his Jewish and primary education in Königsberg.

He joined the Missionary Society of the Immaculate Conception founded by Bodewig as one of its first members. However, this Missionary Society never took off the ground. A group of its members sent to the Belgian Capuchin-run Lahore Mission in 1895 was stranded there. Its leader was one Nicholas Ludwig Hohn, a close friend of Moritz, hailing from Bonn. The Belgian Capuchin Bishop of Lahore constituted the stranded group of German youth in his diocese into a Congregation of Franciscan Tertiary Brothers whose services he hoped to enlist for the diocese.

Moritz broke with Bodewig by 1899 and associated himself with the new Diocesan Congregation of Lahore. Around this time, he had also knotted a firm relationship with the French Fransalian bishop Pelvat of Nagpur, headquarters of the Province of Central India & Berars.

In November 1890, Moritz arrived in India with a few associates. He went to Nagpur from where he, in January 1901, proceeded to Lahore where Bishop Pelkmans admitted him into the Franciscan order and appointed him the Procurator of the new congregation. He then returned to the Nagpur group of his Brothers.

However, his relationship with Pelkmans had been a stormy one and he finally broke off with him and constituted his group into a separate congregation under the Fransalian bishop Jean Marie Crochet of Nagpur as the Congregation of the Missionary Brothers of St. Francis of Assisi, or C.M.S.F. This was on 21 February 1901. Moritz was chosen as the Superior-General of the new congregation and Hohn as the Asst. Superior-General. The community chose to retain its Franciscan character, i.e., remain within the Franciscan order as an autocephalous constituent→ congregation.

In 1902, the Nimar Mission in the North Khandesh region in the province of Central India & Berrars with Khandwa as its headquarters was assigned to the new congregation.

Between this period and the outbreak of World War I, the young congregation made rapid and impressive strides in its expansion and development. They had expanded to place like Agra and Crishnagar (Krishnanagar in the Bengal Presidency); had been given the Padroado parish of Mount Poinsur on the island of Salsette next to Bombay, by the Portuguese Padroado Bishop of Damaõ, and had expanded to Maslianico in north Italy.

At the outbreak of World War I, the British India government interned the German brothers of the congregation, including Moritz. Towards the close of the war, while most of the brothers were deported, Moritz and three of his companions were permitted to stay back. The future of the congregation hanged on the thread of uncertainty.

By 1921, the first of the deportees began to return to India and the congregation began to reclaim its lost ground.

In the first-ever General Chapter of the congregation, held in 1930 under the auspices of the Pontifical Congregation for the Propagation of the Faith (Propaganda Fide), Moritz was elected Superior-General. In the 2nd General Chapter of the congregation, he was re-elected.

At the outbreak of World War II, the British briefly detained him, but owing to his ill health and advanced age, he was set free.

On 19 November 1941 he resigned office, and exactly one year later, on 19 November 1942, he died at Mount Poinsur. His mortal remains are laid to rest in the Monastorial Cemetery at Mount Poinsur.

The Generalate of Paulus Moritz's Congregation is located in the vicinity of Our Lady of Immaculate Conception Church, Mt. Poinsur, Mount Poinsur, at the Monastery of St. Francis of Assisi, Mount Poinsur, Bombay 400 103, at a short distance north-west from the Borivali Railway station.

Today, the C.M.S.F. friars operate not only the Our Lady of the Immaculate Conception parish and their friary, but also the St. Francis of Assisi Technical Institute nearby, which provides vocational training in the technical arts to students.

== See also ==
- Saint Francis D'Assisi High School
- St Francis of Assisi

== Sources ==
- 1982 Directory of the Archdiocese of Bombay, by Frs. Leslie J. Ratus & Errol Rosario, Seminary of Pope St. Pius X, Bombay. No copyright mentioned.
- School Diary. 2003 edition, St. Francis of Assisi School, Mount Poinsur. No copyright mentioned.
