= I.C. Colony =

- Location within Mumbai
- Coordinates: 19.247039°N 72.849830°E
- Country: India
- State: Maharashtra
- District: Mumbai Suburban
- City: Mumbai

Government
  - Type: Municipal Corporation
  - Body: Brihanmumbai Municipal Corporation (MCGM)

Languages
  - Official: Marathi
- Time zone: UTC+5:30 (IST)
- PIN: 400103
- Area code: 022
- Civic agency: BMC

I.C. Colony (Immaculate Conception Colony) is a locality about 25 ha (62 acres) in area in the suburb of Borivali in north-west Mumbai.

IC Colony has the highest concentration of Christians, particularly of Roman Catholics in Mumbai. The name is derived from the Church of the Immaculate Conception, or IC Church, which is at the South Eastern entrance of the colony. The Holy Cross Colony and extension (also called IC extension), on Holy Cross Street, which extends beyond IC Colony towards Dahisar (Mumbai's last zone before Thane district) is also part of the extended Catholic locale. Many old mansions can be found here though most are now broken down to make way for newer apartment buildings. The Postal Index Number for the colony is 400103.

The colony has accessibility to the Link Road, SV Road, Gorai-Manori-Uttan beaches, the Western Express Highway, Western Railway Line, and the new Mumbai Metro Line 2A.

== History ==
=== I.C. Church (Immaculate Conception Church) ===
One of the oldest churches in Mumbai, it was built in 1547 AD by the Franciscans. The Franciscan Fr, Antonio Do Porto earlier owned the village of Mount Poinsur. Soon the Franciscan bought the neighbouring villages of Pare(Goregaon) and Arrangal around 1556 A.D.- 1559A. D. Adjoining the Church they also built a Royal College and Monastery in 1549, the ruins of which are still standing close to the present Church building. The Mandapeshwar Caves had been used by the Franciscans as a crypt of the Church and later Served for the Parishioners.

Around 1630 there was about 1500 parishioners in the villages of Mount Poinsur, Dhainsa (Dahisar), Simpor, Canary (Kanheri) and Cassor. It was around this time that the name of the church was changed to 'Our Lady of Immaculate Conception' from 'Our Lady of Piety'. During the Maratha invasion of 1739, Mount Poinsur was captured and the Franciscans dispersed. The Church, Friary and College were pillaged and left in ruins. The following 150 years saw the already damaged structure disintegrate into further ruins. In 1888, through the efforts of the people of Bandra and under the guidance of the Dean of Thane, Fr. Joao Bras Fernandes rebuilt the old parish Church and has been functioning till date.

It is the second most populated parish in Mumbai. There is a Marathi speaking Protestant congregation called the Methodist Marathi Church Borivali - in IC Colony.Saint Francis D'Assisi High School, located next to the church and Mary Immaculate Girls' High School are also located in I.C. Colony. Vibgyor High School is now in I.C. Colony. It has Mumbai's biggest pet park.

The postal code for this region is 400103 and is near to Mandapeshwar Caves.
