= Gorai Creek =

Creek in Mumbai, India

Coordinates: 19°13′59″N 72°49′27″E

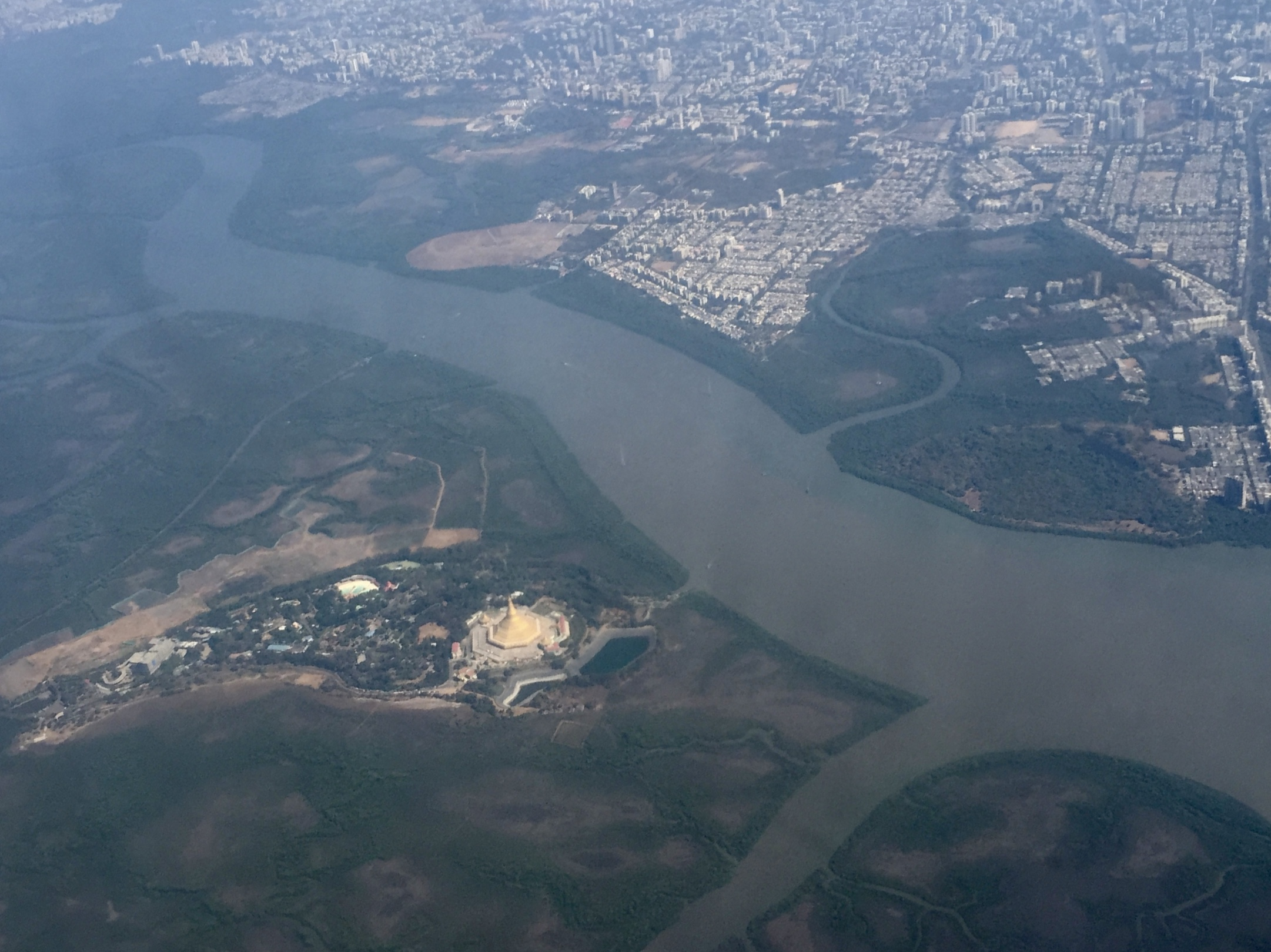
Aerial view of the Gorai Creek

The Gorai Creek is a creek off the coast of suburban Mumbai, in India. It lies between Borivali (west) and Gorai village. A ferry ride across the creek to Essel World, Gorai Beach and the Global Vipassana Pagoda takes around 10 to 15 minutes.

In 2018, Greater Flamingos were seen at the Gorai Creek for the first time.
