= Tungareshwar Wildlife Sanctuary =

Protected area in Maharashtra, India

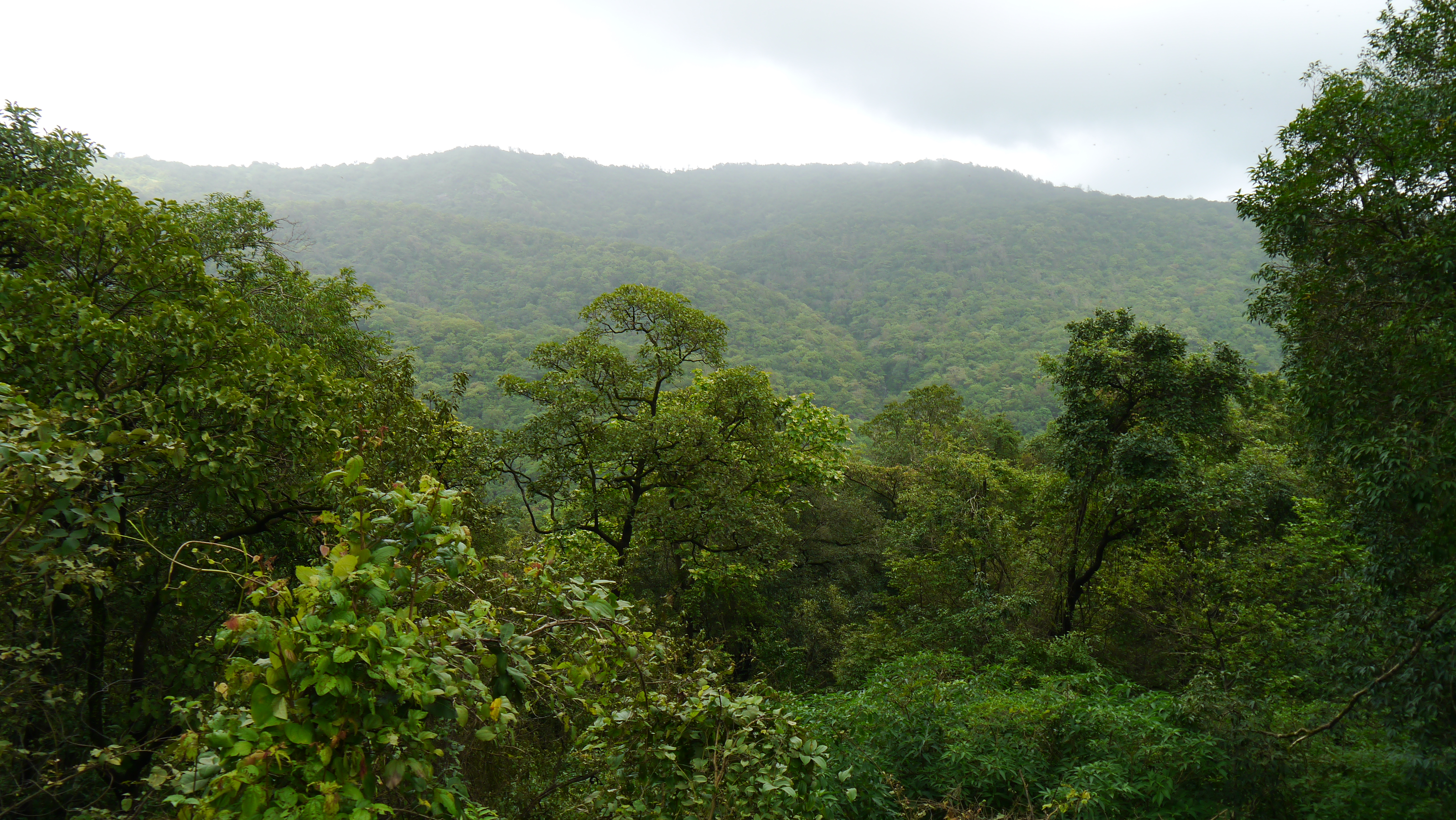
- Tungareshwar Wildlife Sanctuary

- Location within Maharashtra Location within India
- Interactive map of Tungareshwar Wildlife Sanctuary
- Location: Palghar district, Maharashtra, India
- Coordinates: 19°24′11″N 72°57′29″E
- Area: 85.7 km^{2} (33.1 sq mi)
- Established: 24 October 2003
- Governing body: Maharashtra State Forest Department

Tungareshwar Wildlife Sanctuary, also known as Tungareshwar National Park, is located on a plateau east of Vasai and Virar in Palghar district, north of Mumbai, in the Indian state of Maharashtra.

The sanctuary is over 85 km^{2} and forms a corridor between Sanjay Gandhi National Park and Tansa Wildlife Sanctuary. It has an altitude of about 2177 feet from the base.

Tungareshwar was declared a wildlife sanctuary in 2003. It rises to about 665 meters above sea level, making it a very popular destination for trekkers. In 2003 it was brought under the administrative control of the Sanjay Gandhi National Park Division, Borivali, Mumbai. Many bird walks and nature excursions by wildlife professionals from around Mumbai and Vasai Taluka are conducted here. Biodiversity is rich here: about 600 species of plants, over 250 species of birds, 150 species of butterflies and 36 species of herpetofauna have been recorded.

There is a temple at about 3 km from the Tungareshwar WLS base, due to which many devotees travel uphill to the temple by auto rickshaw or by foot. This pilgrimage site within the wildlife sanctuary has brought unrest amongst the wildlife, due to increased footfall of devotees. After this trail point, a huge entrance sign board can be viewed for The Balyogi Shri Sadanand Maharaj Ashram; which is misleading and ideally should be taken down, since the illegal structure of the ashram had been demolished in 2019 after orders from the Supreme Court. There are currently no signages indicating the distance to the top of the WLS. While the ashram structure is in ruins, there is still yet another functional temple in there approximately 11 kilometres from the base entry. This trail further pretty much has no human sighting, yet can be considered safe during the day time, although you would hear the loud screeches of the gray langurs who would also be astonished to see human presence once in a while. The terrain is a mix of rocky surface and flatland intermittently. Trekkers must make sure you carry along medical kit, and really good amount of water with you. Highly recommended to wear full sleeves clothes to avoid any bites, wounds, tans. Carrying a cap and sunglasses is a must to protect you from the harsh heat, as this route has less shade. There are two ways you can reach the summit of the Tungareshwar WLS, one being from Vasai Road West which starts from the main gate itself, the other one can be trekked from the region of Parol / Vajreshwari. The distance from the base of the plateau to the top is approximately 11 km., while that from Parol is said to be 8 km.

From Mumbai, Tungareshwar WLS can be reached by road or railways. It is en route the NH 48 towards Gujarat. Via train, one can board the Western line (Mumbai Suburban Railway) and alight at Vasai Road Railway Station which is towards the North of Mumbai suburbs. From Vasai Road railway station (east) exit, sharing/private autos are available till the Tungareshwar WLS base main gate. Auto rides are also available to and from the temple.

The Supreme Court (SC) 1 December 2022, exempted Maharashtra's Tungareshwar Wildlife Sanctuary (TWS) from its 3 June order mandating the creation of a one-kilometre eco-sensitive zone (ESZ) around all Protected Areas in India.
