= Missionary Sisters of the Queen of the Apostles =

Roman Catholic congregation

The Congregation of the Missionary Sisters of the Queen of the Apostles (SRA; German: Missionsschswestern Königin der Apostel) is a Roman Catholic religious congregation established on 1 July 1923 in Vienna, Austria.

It originated in the Missionary Society of the Immaculate Conception founded in 1893 by German Jesuit priest, Fr. Antonius Maria Bodewig (1893–1915) with the aim of training and sending out missionaries for India. The society was suppressed by the Holy See in 1905 but the community continued under the leadership of Theodor Innitzer (1875–1955), future Archbishop of Vienna and cardinal.

In 1923 the congregation was restored under the name of the Missionary Society of the Queen of the Apostles, comprising a men's branch (discontinued in 1953) and a women's branch, which continued as the women's congregation. This obtained the pontifical decretum laudis on 7 April 1949 and the definitive approval of the Holy See on 29 February 1964.

There are currently 950 sisters working in seven countries worldwide in more than 147 communities. The congregation celebrated their centenary year in 2023. The current superior general of the congregation is Sr Zeena Dsouza..
