= Devipada =

- Locality
- Location in Mumbai, Maharashtra, India#Location in Maharashtra, India Devipada (Maharashtra)
- Coordinates: 19°13′30″N 72°51′51″E
- Country: India
- State: Maharashtra
- District: Mumbai

Languages
  - Official: Marathi
- Time zone: UTC+5:30 (IST)
- Vehicle registration: MH-
- Coastline: 0 kilometres (0 mi)
- Climate: Tropical monsoon (Köppen)
- Avg. summer temperature: 37 °C (99 °F)
- Avg. winter temperature: 18 °C (64 °F)

Devipada is a densely populated area in East Borivali, Mumbai, Maharashtra, India. Devipada includes Devipada SRA CHS (known as Titananic bld), Sadguru Nagar, Vitthal Nagar, Millennium Tower, Gulmohar and Sahyadri. It is centered around the Devipada metro station.

Most residents are Marathi, with a number of Gujaratis and North Indians. Shree Gajanan Maharaj Mandir Bhakt Mandal is very famous & popular not only in Devipada but also in borivali. This area is politically very important for the politicians. about 40% of earlier devipada is undergone for construction of buildings till 20-04-2011, still work is in progress.

== Buses ==
Following buses stop at the Devipada bus stop:

- Ordinary buses: 225 287 298
- Limited buses: 40ltd 348ltd 398ltd 400ltd 523ltd 524ltd 700ltd 701ltd 703ltd 704ltd 708ltd 709ltd
