= Borivali =

Suburb of Mumbai, Maharashtra, India

Borivali Borivli
- Suburb
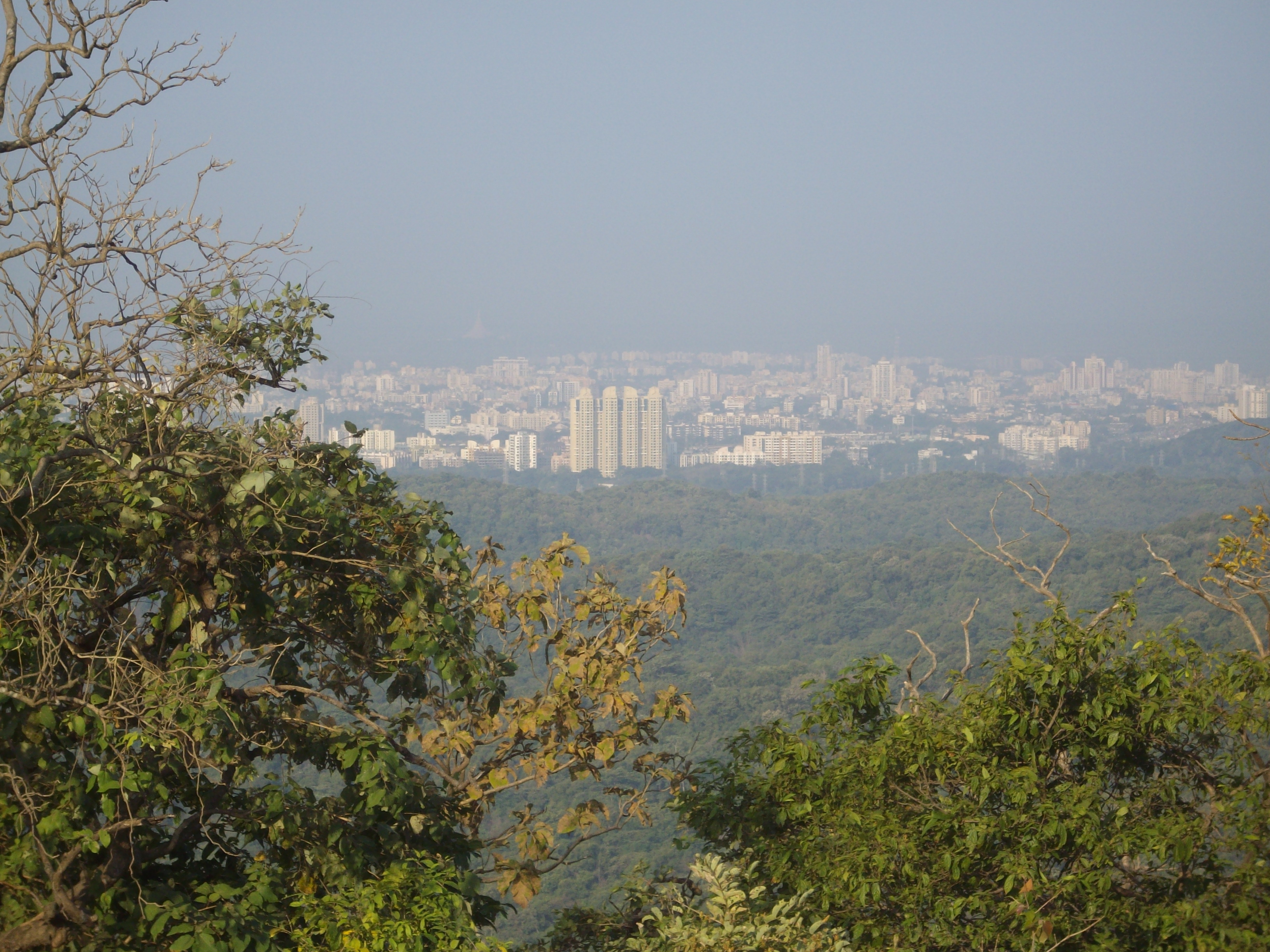
- Borivali skyline from Sanjay Gandhi National Park

- Location of Borivali in Mumbai Borivali (Maharashtra) Borivali (Mumbai)
- Coordinates: 19.23°N 72.86°E
- Country: India
- State: Maharashtra
- District: Mumbai Suburban
- City: Mumbai

Government
  - Type: Municipal Corporation
  - Body: Brihanmumbai Municipal Corporation (MCGM)

Population (2011)
  - Total: 1 Million

Languages
  - Official: Marathi
- Time zone: UTC+5:30 (IST)
- PIN: Borivali (East) - 400066; Borivali (West) - 400091, 400092; Mandapeshwar (Borivali) - 400103
- Area code: 022
- Vehicle registration: MH 47
- Lok Sabha constituency: Mumbai North
- Vidhan Sabha constituency: Borivali (Note: Covers western part of the suburb); Magathane (Note: Covers eastern part of the suburb)

Borivali (Pronunciation: [boːɾiʋəliː]) is a suburb located in northwestern Mumbai, India. Traditionally, tribals and East Indians lived in Borivali.

Attractions include the Sanjay Gandhi National Park, Fish Park, Kanheri Caves, Mandapeshwar Caves, Water Kingdom, the Rushivan and Hanuman Tekdi, with views of the suburbs.

Borivali railway station is an originating and terminating Railway Station for Mumbai local trains towards Churchgate in the South & Virar in the North. Also some express trains halt at this rail station which provides ease for people travelling long distances.

== Demographics ==
Borivali has a large population of Marathi people, followed by Gujarati people.

== History ==
Reliefs at Borivali, 1897.

Reliefs at Borivali, 1897.

The names Borivaḻī (बोरिवळी) and Boriyli-gram occur as the name of a place in the 15th-17th-century Marathi-language text Mahikavatichi Bakhar; these names derive from the term for the Indian jujube tree (bor in Marathi).

The present-day Borivali has developed from what was once a conglomerate region of smaller settlements, namely Eksar, Poisar, Vazira, Shimpoli, Mandpeshwar, Dattapada, Kanheri, Tulsi, Magathane, and Gorai, which were situated on and around Mount Poinsur, between the Dahisar River and Poisar River.

The pre-historic era's "Mandpeshwar" (“An 8th-century remain of a beautiful Edifice structure, the Mandapeshwar Caves is a rock cut architecture and a Hindu shrine of Lord Shiva located near Borivali IC Colony, at walking distance from Dahisar Railway Station”) and "Kanheri caves" stand testament to the rich history of this place. Borivali was spelt "Berewlee" by the then ruled India under the British Raj. It is also spelt and pronounced as "Borivli".

Borivali is densely populated but continues to retain some green cover due to the presence of the Sanjay Gandhi National Park, previously known as the "Borivali National Park", in the east and the mangroves in the western end of Borivali.

== Landmarks ==
One of the many gardens that Borivali boasts of is the Veer Savarkar Udyan on Lokmanya Tilak Road and Rivali Park. It has four entrances from T.P.S. Road, Factory Lane, and Babhai and has a jogging track, a boating area, a children's play garden, and skating. Gorai Udyan is at Gorai Sector-1. I.C.Colony is also home to the Tukaram Ombale Garden/Fish Park, which can be accessed from the Link Road and the I.C. Colony last bus stop.

In 2009, Jhansi Ki Rani Laxmibai Joggers' Park was inaugurated on Link Road, adjacent to the Eskay Resort. The plot measures around 4 acres, has a jogging track surrounding a body of water, where boating facilities have been started, and features slabs with information on various freedom fighters scripted on them, besides seating areas for senior citizens. This Jogger's Park has a small fee for entry. Another Joggers' Park is located in Chikuwadi.

Espee Square is an upcoming business center on Dattapada Road, connected to the Western Express Highway at Borivali East.

Oberoi Sky City is an upcoming township with Skyscrapers, a mall and a 5-star hotel.

The Orion is an upcoming Business Park on Sardar Vallabhbhai Patel Rd at Borivali West.

== Attractions ==
- Gorai Beach is on the western end of Borivali. One can reach here by crossing Gorai Creek by ferry. Rickshaw is available on the other side of the ferry. On holidays the beach is full of visitors and locals. Plenty of accommodation options are also available at Gorai beach.
- EsselWorld: One of Mumbai's largest amusement parks. Post COVID-19 pandemic, this facility stands closed.
- Water Kingdom: Asia's largest water park.
- Sanjay Gandhi National Park is one of the national parks within the metro limits of a major city, and one of the most visited national parks in the world.
- Our Lady of Immaculate Conception Church – Mount Poinsur, Mandapeshwar, I. C. Colony. – Roman Catholic church
- Mandapeshwar Caves
- Global Vipassana Pagoda
- Mandapeshwar Caves
- Kanheri Caves
- Gorai Mangrove Park

== Education ==
- Ryan International School
- VIBGYOR Group of Schools
- Saint Francis D'Assisi High School
- Mary Immaculate Girls' High School
- JBCN International School
- Don Bosco High School and Junior College
- St. Anne's Girls High School
- Matushri Kashiben Vrajlal Valia International Vidyalaya
- Nalanda Law College

== Transportation ==
Road Ways: Autorickshaws, taxis, BEST buses and trains are the public modes of transport available in and to Borivali. Borivali (east) is well connected with Western Express Highway while Borivali (west) is linked to the New Link Road. Connectivity has increased with two metro lines set to pass through Borivali: Mumbai Metro Line 2 and Mumbai Metro Line 7.

=== Railway station ===
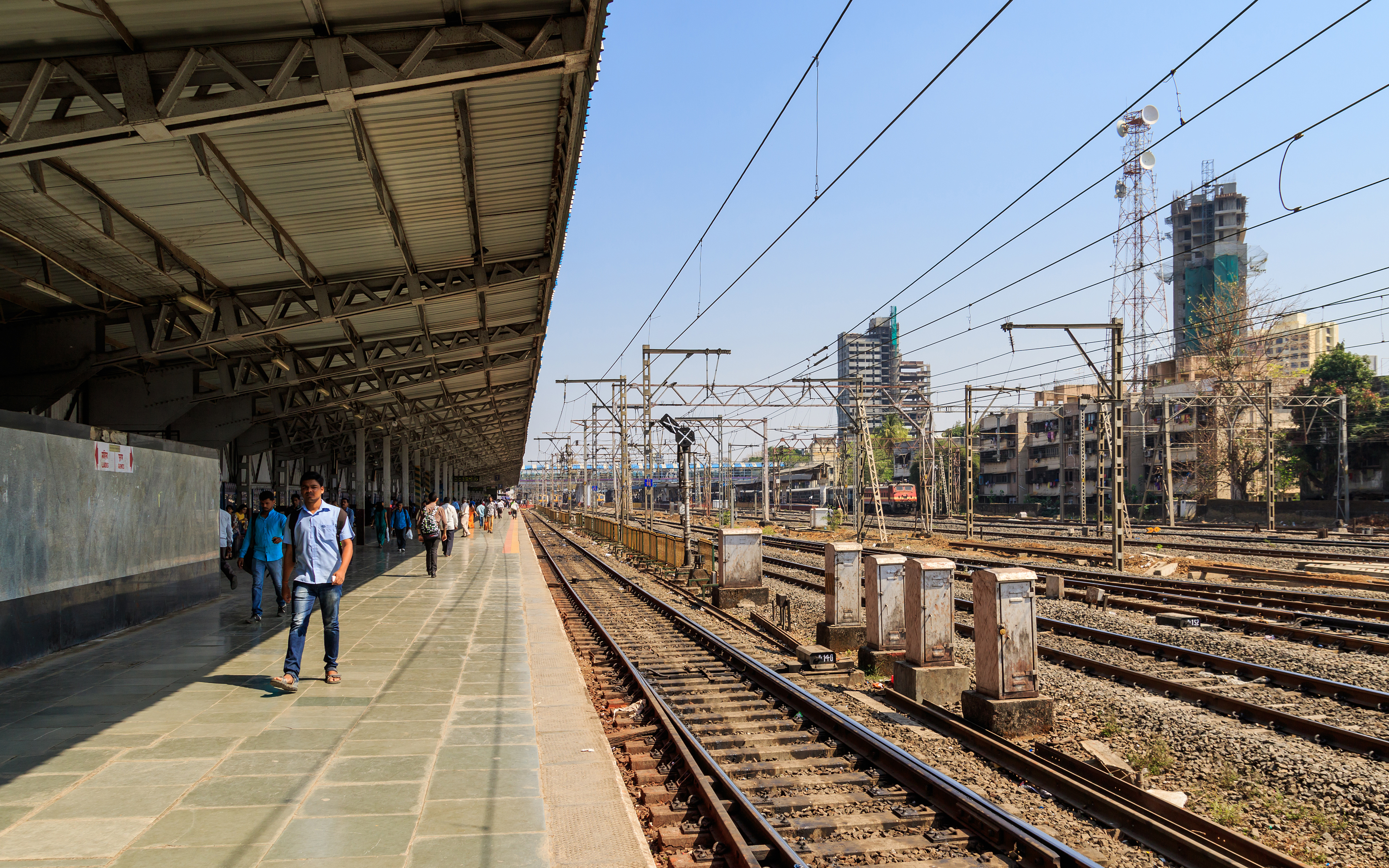
Borivali railway station

Borivali railway station is a railway station on the Western line of the Mumbai Suburban Railway network. It is one of the major platforms of the Mumbai metropolitan city and the biggest railway station in the Western railway. The platform has access to all stations from Churchgate to Virar. The platform has good connectivity for Express trains which goes to different states around the country. It has 10 platforms which were renumbered in 2019, this sudden change created much confusion for everyday travelers. With every platform being busy for almost 18–20 hours a day. It is believed to be one of the blind-friendly railway stations on the western railway. Information obtained under the Right to Information (RTI) Act reveals that it is the most crowded station in Mumbai with around 2.87 lakh passengers traveling from there daily.

== Notable people ==
- Asha Bhosle, singer
- Rohit Sharma, cricketer
- Haribhai Parthibhai Chaudhary, politician, National Leader of the Bharatiya Janata Party
- Jaywant Dalvi, Marathi author
- Drashti Dhami, TV actress
- Bhavya Gandhi, TV actor
- Avdhoot Gupte, Marathi classical singer
- Bose Krishnamachari, Malayali painter
- Dhondutai Kulkarni, Hindustani classical singer
- Ram Naik, UP Governor, former minister
- Ratnakar Pai, Hindustani classical singer
- Rohan Shah, actor
- Vinod Tawde, Member of Legislative Assembly, Minister
- Disha Vakani, TV actress

== See also ==
- Dattapada
- Devipada
- Kandivali
- Dahisar
