= MKVV International Vidyalaya =

Location
- Sheth MK School Complex, Factory Lane, Borivali West, Mumbai, India, 400092

Information
- School type: Private, co-educational
- Motto: Knowledge is Light
- Established: 1999
- School board: CBSE
- Grades: Nursery to XII standard

MKVV International Vidyalaya, mkvviv, or Matushri Kashiben Vrajlal Valia International Vidyalaya, formerly known as BES International Vidyalaya, is a private, CBSE affiliated school in Borivali, Mumbai, India.

== History ==
M.K.V.V. International Vidyalaya is an offspring of the Borivli Education Society which is a registered body.

The school was established on 21 June 1999, under the guidance and vision of Shri. Vinubhai Valia, who has been the President of Borivali Education Society for the last 25 years.

The foundation of the school was laid by the Director, Shri. Shantilal M. Shah.

== Academics ==
The school is affiliated to Central Board of Secondary Education up to Std.XII. It is a co-educational school from Nursery to Class XII.

As per the CBSE norms, the students are introduced to a third language in their sixth grade. The school offers a choice between Sanskrit and French. As the students proceed to their ninth grade and are relieved of one language (as per CBSE norms), they may choose from Hindi, Sanskrit and French.

The school offers medical, non-medical and commerce to its senior secondary section.

== Co-curricular activities ==
Apart from imparting knowledge and wisdom to all its torch bearers, the school also emphasizes co-curricular activities and sports. These are usually inter-house competitions wherein the school is divided into four houses:

- Red House - motto: Pride gears us up for action
- Blue House - motto: Strength gives confidence
- Yellow House - motto: Energetic attitude leads to success
- Green House - motto: Cheerful attitude leads to motivation

== Infrastructure ==
The school has classrooms, a computer lab, separate labs for physics, chemistry and biology, a hall that holds competitions, yoga and dance classes, a massive playground, a sports room, and a first aid room.

Cultural activities and summer camps take place here.
