= Sanjay Gandhi National Park =

National park in Mumbai, India

- Borivali National Park
- IUCN category II (national park)

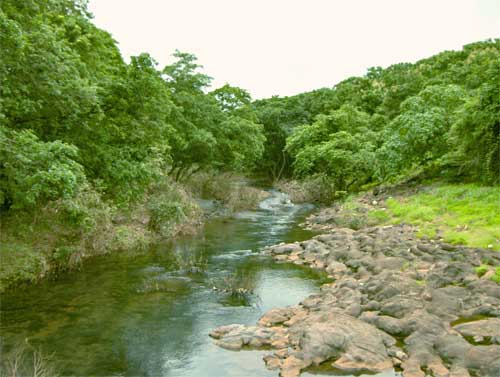
- River in the national park

- Location within Maharashtra Location within India
- Interactive map of Sanjay Gandhi National Park
- Location: Mumbai, Maharastra, India
- Coordinates: 19°15′N 72°55′E
- Area: 87 km^{2} (34 sq mi)
- Established: 1996
- Named for: Sanjay Gandhi
- Visitors: 2 million per year
- Governing body: Ministry of Environment, Forest and Climate Change

Sanjay Gandhi National Park is a 103.84 km^{2} (40.09 sq mi) national park in Mumbai, Maharashtra, with its headquarters situated in Borivali. The national park attracts more than 2 million visitors every year.

== History ==
The protected landscape now known as Sanjay Gandhi National Park has a history dating back to the period 10 BCE. According to the official history of the park, the forested tract lay on an ancient route between the historic ports of Sopara and Kalyan, and the Kanheri Caves within the park served as an important Buddhist centre of learning and pilgrimage.

In the pre-independence period, the area was known as Krishnagiri National Park. The park was expanded in 1969 by acquiring adjoining reserve forest lands. The official park history states that the area was later administered as Borivali National Park, and in 1981 it was re-dedicated as Sanjay Gandhi National Park. The park was subsequently coupled with additional forests from the Thane division to form the present protected area resulting into an expansion in its total area from 87 km^{2} (34 sq mi) to 103.84 km^{2} (40.09 sq mi).

The creation and consolidation of the park were closely tied to the protection of the catchments of Vihar Lake and Tulsi Lake, both of which were developed in the nineteenth century as part of Mumbai's water-supply system.

The Kanheri Caves, located centrally in the park, and said to be 2400 years old, were important Buddhist learning centres and pilgrimage sites, sculpted by Buddhist monks between the 9th and the 1st centuries BCE.. They were chiselled out of a massive basaltic rock outcropping..

== Geography and hydrology ==
Sanjay Gandhi National Park covers about 103 km^{2} (40 sq mi), including 44.44 km^{2} (17.16 sq mi) in Mumbai Suburban district and about 59.24 km^{2} (22.87 sq mi) in Thane district. It occupies most of the northern suburbs of Mumbai. To the west lie the suburbs of Goregaon, Malad, Kandivali, Borivali, and Dahisar. To the east lie the suburbs of Bhandup and Mulund. To the south lies the Aarey Forest and the university campus of IIT Bombay.The northern reaches of this forest lie in Thane city. The park and the areas around it, except Thane city, are all part of Mumbai. Sanjay Gandhi National Park is one of the few protected areas in India that falls within the municipal limits of a major metropolis. It has been described as a notable example of a large urban national park, where biodiversity conservation, public access, informal settlement, and metropolitan expansion intersect in a highly compressed landscape.

Sanjay Gandhi National Park encompasses the catchments of Vihar and Tulsi lakes, which are important for Mumbai's water supply, and its eco-sensitive surroundings serve as a key ecological buffer for the metropolitan region.

=== Eco-Sensitive Zone ===
The Ministry of Environment, Forest and Climate Change, in December 2016, notified an Eco-sensitive Zone (ESZ) around the park under the Environment Protection Act, 1986. The notified zone covers 59.456 square kilometres and extends for varying distances of between 100 metres and four kilometres from the boundary of the national park. The notification was intended to create an ecological buffer around the protected area and regulate activities that could adversely affect the park.

The notification prohibits activities including commercial mining, stone quarrying and crushing units and certain polluting industries, while other activities, including construction, hotels and resorts, tree felling and infrastructure development, are subject to regulation. It also required the Maharashtra government to prepare a Zonal Master Plan for the ESZ incorporating environmental and ecological considerations.

In March 2026, the Maharashtra government approved a Zonal Master Plan for the SGNP eco-sensitive zone. The plan provides a regulatory framework for land use and development within the zone, including restrictions on highly polluting industries, protection of water bodies and provisions governing development and eco-tourism

== Flora and fauna ==
Sanjay Gandhi National Park is one of the most important biodiversity refuges in the Mumbai region. It is home to over 1,000 plant species, 251 bird species, 5,000 insect species, 150 butterfly species, 40 mammal species, 38 reptile species and nine amphibian species.Official park material describes the area as dominated by southern mixed deciduous forest, with an estimated 1,300 species of flowering plants. A major floristic survey published by the Botanical Survey of India documented the park's plant diversity in detail.

The park supports a wide range of mammals, reptiles, birds, bats, and invertebrates. Official fauna summaries mention species such as four-horned antelope, Indian mouse deer, Asian palm civet, Indian crested porcupine, bonnet macaque, rhesus macaque, and hanuman langur, as well as 17 bat species.

The park is especially well known for its leopard population, which persists within and around one of the world's most densely populated metropolitan regions. A 2022 peer-reviewed study comparing SGNP with the adjoining Tungareshwar Wildlife Sanctuary described the park as a major urban leopard landscape and reported that leopard density in SGNP was among the highest recorded for the species.

In the state of Maharashtra, the mass flowering of karvi has been observed to occur in Mumbai in the same year as in the hill station of Khandala, and one year earlier in Bhimashankar, and Malshej Ghat, beyond Kalyan.

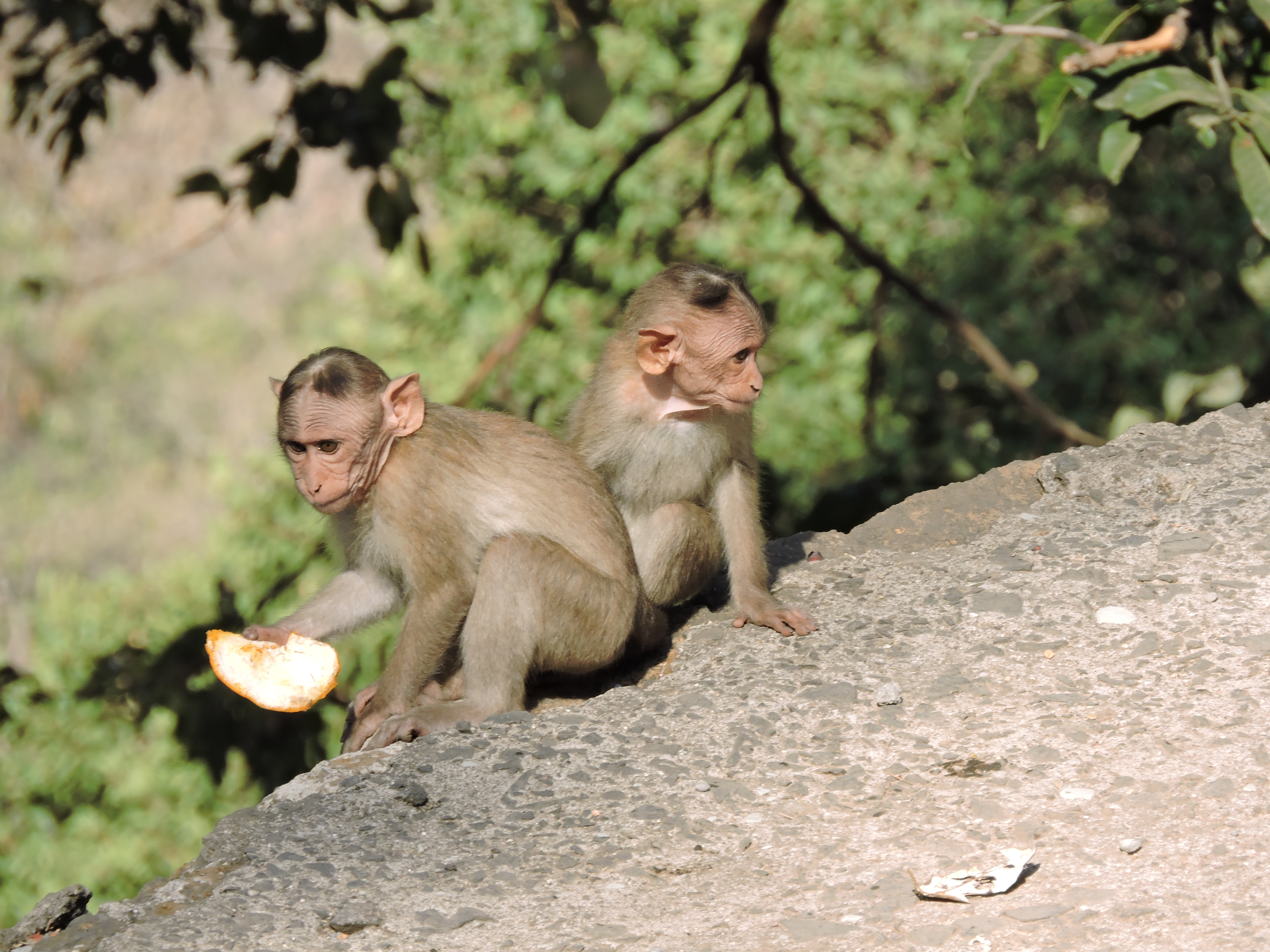
Bonnet macaques in Sanjay Gandhi National Park

Reptiles living here include crocodiles in the Tulsi Lake, pythons, cobras, checkered keelback, common krait, monitor lizards, Russell's vipers, bamboo pit viper and Indian cat snakes. In 2003, pugmarks and droppings of a Bengal tiger were found in the park. Although the tiger was never widely sighted, it did bring some excitement to city folks, as records of tiger, being found here are quite old and forgotten now, with the last tiger being shot down 80 years earlier in the region. Conservation was also proposed for the interlinked habitat corridors and nearby forest areas in the state, along with upgrading their status as a tiger habitat.

Some of the birds in the park are jungle owlets, golden orioles, racket-tailed drongos, minivets, magpies, robins, hornbills, bulbuls, sunbirds, peacock, and woodpeckers. Migratory and local birds such as the paradise flycatcher and various species of kingfishers, mynas, drongos, swifts, gulls, egrets, and herons have also been spotted.

== Human–wildlife interaction ==
Because the park is enclosed by dense urban development, SGNP has often been central to public discussion about human–wildlife interaction in Mumbai. Academic work and later reporting have increasingly framed the park as a case of coexistence as much as conflict, particularly in relation to leopards surviving in an urban edge habitat shaped by informal settlements, waste, feral and free-ranging animals, and intense human use.

Studies in SGNP have highlighted that human–leopard interactions in and around the park are shaped by factors including prey availability, surrounding land-use patterns, and management and awareness measures intended to reduce conflict.

On 16 July 2012, a seven-year-old girl was killed in Mulund, right outside her home, by a leopard. A year later, a 40-year-old woman was attacked and killed by a leopard in Bhiwandi, Thane City, in 2013. Five days later, a 14-year-old shepherd survived a leopard attack in the same region. In 2014, a two-year-old child went missing from Ghoong village in Wada. August 2015 saw four leopard attacks in Thane city. In one incident, a leopard and her cub dragged a one-year-old Rottweiler off.

== Visitor access and facilities ==
Sanjay Gandhi National Park is one of the most heavily visited protected areas in India. It serves both as a conservation area and as a major site for urban environmental education and recreation.. The park's official visitor information promotes activities such as cycling, boating, interpretation facilities, a butterfly garden, access to the Kanheri Caves, and a network of guided nature treks and trails.Official park guidance states that, apart from Gandhi Tekdi and Kanheri Caves, visitor activities are generally not operated on Mondays.

=== Nature trails ===
The park maintains a network of nature trails intended for guided trekking, birdwatching, and ecological interpretation. Official trail descriptions identify routes such as the Shilonda Trail, Malad Trail Line, Kanheri/Upper Trail, Bamboo Hut/Gaimukh Trail, Highest Point Trail and Kashimira Trek.

According to the park's trail descriptions, these routes pass through a range of habitats and viewpoints, including evergreen patches, dry deciduous stretches, waterholes, rocky ridges, and vantage points overlooking Tulsi, Vihar, and Powai lakes.

=== Safari ===
The park contains captive lion and tiger safari facilities that function as visitor attractions. Lion safari operations at SGNP date back to 1975 and became a major revenue source for the park.The tiger safari was designed in the mid-1990s and opened to visitors in 1998. After several years of restricted operation, the safari was redesigned and reopened in 2024 with a 20-hectare enclosure intended to more closely resemble the animals' natural habitat.

In 2025, the state government announced plans for a leopard safari within the park, with officials stating that rescued or rehabilitated leopards and cubs could eventually form part of that visitor facility.

=== Van Rani mini train ===
The Van Rani mini train is one of the park's best-known attractions. The service first began in the 1970s on a narrow-gauge route and was suspended in 2021 after track damage caused by Cyclone Tauktae. The train resumed operation in 2026 after restoration and conversion to a battery-powered syst\em.

== Conservation challenges, encroachments and controversies ==
SGNP has long been affected by competing pressures arising from urban growth, infrastructure development, public access, and conservation policy. Academic studies have described the park as a contested urban space in which preservation of green cover, housing pressure, and unequal access to land and nature have repeatedly come into conflict.

=== Infrastructure development ===
In the 2020s, new transport and road proposals renewed concerns about ecological fragmentation and tree loss in and around the park. In 2023, Hindustan Times reported that the State Board of Wildlife had approved the felling of 122 trees in the core area and eco-sensitive zone of the park for the proposed Borivali–Thane twin tunnel project, drawing criticism from environmentalists over ecological damage and the use of explosives for shafts and access holes.

Separate controversy arose over the Thane–Borivali Twin Tunnel, whose twin tunnels are designed to pass beneath forested terrain associated with SGNP. In 2024, it was reported that 1,567 trees would be affected by the project alignment, including 513 proposed for cutting and 581 for transplantation. In 2025, it was reported that the Union government had granted final approval for diversion of 19.43 hectares of reserved forest land for the project.

The park has also figured in disputes over smaller infrastructure works on its periphery. In 2024, there were objections to a proposal to divert a portion of SGNP forest land for reconstruction and widening of the Shri Krishna Nagar bridge in Borivali East, with environmentalists arguing that continuing piecemeal diversion of forest land was harming the park's ecology.

=== Conflict with Adivasi settlers and Encroachment ===
The park & the notified ESZ has been subjected to encroachment with news articles stating that several shanties and slums have been illegally constructed within the ESZ.According to the Forest Department, there are 2000 families of individuals considering themselves as original inhabitants known as Adivasi residing in 43 hamlets along the edge of the park. However, there are 24,951 families of persons who have encroached on the park area. All of these families are eligible for relocation as per the Urban Development Department. The Forest Department has not made much headway in removing these encroachments despite there being court orders for their removal since the 1990s. The Bombay High Court had even mooted the formation of high powered committee to look into the issue of removal of illegal settlements and rehabilitation of eligible inhabitants of the park. In 2026, protests by the Adivasi residents of the Park have resulted in stalling of the Forest Departments attempts to conduct a demolition drive. The Forest Department has also claimed that all original Adivasi settlers were relocated in 1977 & the present settlers are those that were relocated but returned to reestablish settlements.
