= Mount Poinsur =

Mount Poinsur is located in the suburb of Borivali west, Mumbai. It is the site of St. Francis of Assisi Church, Mt. Poinsur. Our Lady of Immaculate Conception Church, Borivali and the St. Francis School run by the Missionary Brothers of Paulus Moritz are located there.

In the caves near Mount Poinsur, there was an 8th-century Mandapeshwar rock-cut shrine of Shiva. Above the cave were also ruins of a Portuguese church. Many East Indians were living in that area.
