= Our Lady of Immaculate Conception Church, Borivali =

IC Church Borivali
- Our Lady of Immaculate Conception Church, Borivali West
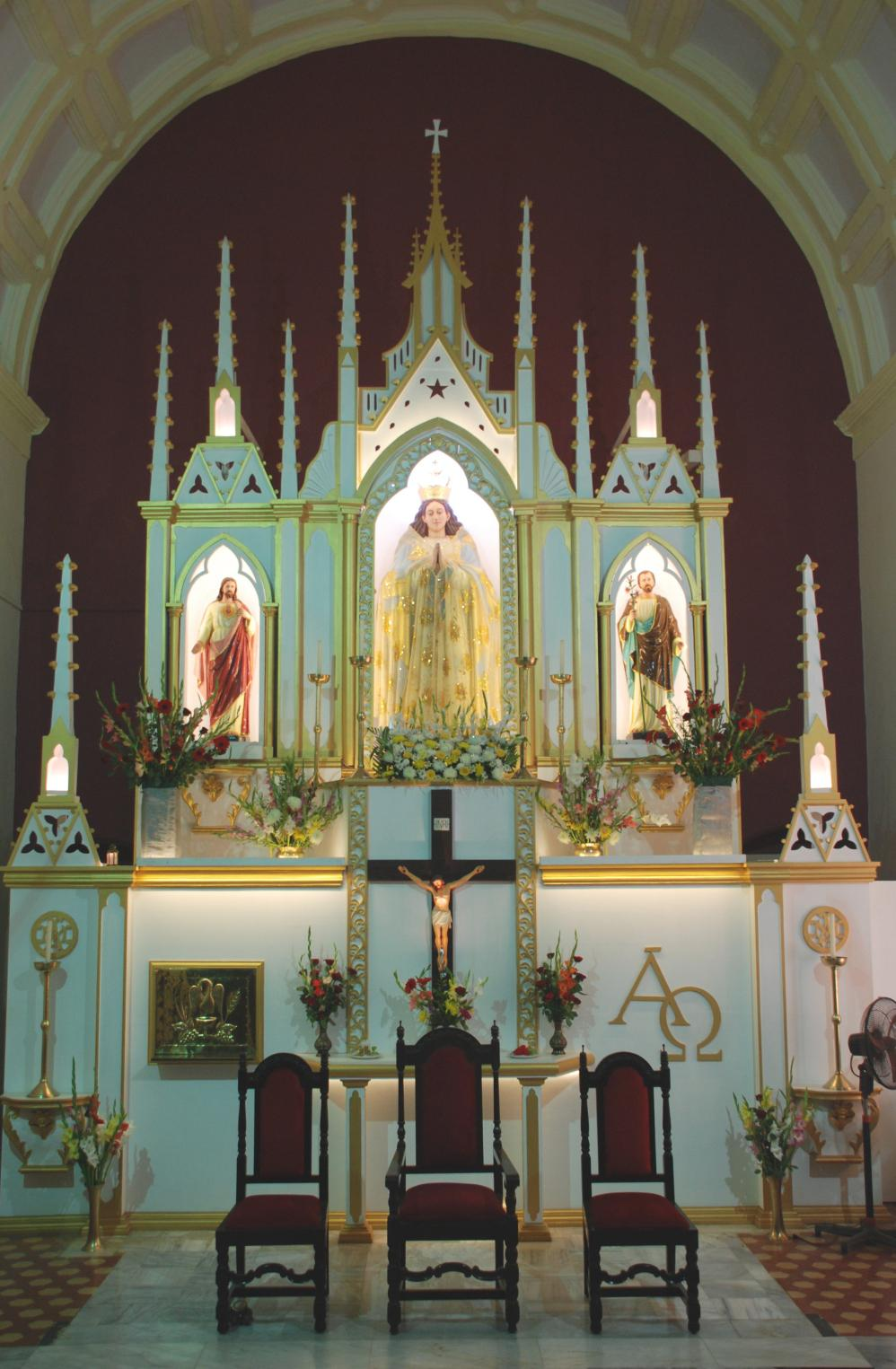
- Altar of the Church
- IC Church Borivali
- 19°14′40″N 72°51′11″E
- Location: Borivali, Mumbai
- Country: India
- Denomination: Roman Catholic
- Website: icchurchborivali.org

History
- Former name: Nossa Senhora da Piedade
- Status: Parish Church
- Founded: 1547; 479 years ago
- Dedication: Immaculate Conception

Architecture
- Functional status: Active

Administration
- Archdiocese: Archdiocese of Bombay

Clergy
- Archbishop: Oswald Gracias
- Bishop(s): Dominic Savio Fernandes; John Rodrigues; Barthol Barretto
- Priest(s): Fr Gerald Fernandes (PP), Fr Joseph David, Fr Victor Louis and Fr Sean Sequeira

Our Lady of the Immaculate Conception Church, Borivali (West) has been a Roman Catholic Parish from 1547 to 1739 and again from 1912 onwards. It is situated in I.C. Colony or Immaculate Conception Colony, which is a large colony in the suburbs of Borivali, in the North Western face of Mumbai, Maharashtra, India.

Reportedly, Fr. Antonio Do Porto and his companion Fr. Antonio Do Casol built the church in 1544, and started worship services in 1547. The recent clergy included Fr Gerald Fernandes (PP), Fr Joseph David, Fr Victor Noronha and Fr Sean Sequeira.

== History ==
The Church was built in Portuguese style of architecture in the fifteenth century and had rich carved wood panelling. Adjoining the present Church building are the Mandapeshwar caves which date back to circa 750-850 AD. The church was razed during the Maratha invasion, where Portuguese were defeated in 1739. It was in ruins for the next 150 years.

Originally with 400 parishioners, it improved by October 1548, with the baptisms by Fr Antonio do Porto and his companion Joao de Goa and a number of people founded the ‘devout hermitage’ at Mount Poinsur. In October 1549, the Church had the description Nossa Senhora da Piedade, i.e. Our Lady of Piety, considered as the original name of the Church.

Around 1630, the number increased to around 1,500 parishioners and worship started again in 1818 after it was in ruins for 70. Restoration was done in 1888 and it was rebuilt in Indian architectural style and got a vicar in 1912. People of Bandra, under the guidance of the Dean of Thane, Fr Joao Braz Fernandes helpted rebuilt the old parish Church. From 1739 to 1912, there was no resident Vicar of Mt Poinsur. Another renovation took place in 1960.

Adjoining the Church, they also built a Royal College and Monastery in 1549. The Mandapeshwar caves had been used by the Franciscans as a crypt of the Church and later served as a chapel for the parishioners.

The Mandapeshwar caves were taken over by the Government of India in 1969 and designated as Protected Archaeological Monuments under the Archaeological Survey of India (ASI).

In the 1980s and 1990s, the parish started expanding.Over the last two decades till the current year, 2007, the parish has grown into one of Mumbai’s largest with a vibrant in liturgical and community activities.

On the feast day at Mount Poinsur, 8 December, people from all over Mumbai come in large numbers and it is now a centre for pilgrimage.
