= KidZania Mumbai =

Indoor theme park

- Interactive map of KidZania Mumbai
- Location: 3rd Floor, North Wing, R City Mall, Lal Bahadur Shastri Marg, Amrut Nagar, Ghatkopar West, Mumbai, Maharashtra 400086, India
- Coordinates: 19.099806°N 72.914411°E
- Status: Operating
- Opened: August 29, 2013
- Owner: KidZania
- Operated by: ImagiNation Edutainment India
- General manager: Aditya Menon
- Theme: Educational entertainment
- Slogan: "Get ready for a better world."
- Operating season: year-round
- Attendance: 7.2 million visitors
- Area: 6,967 square metres (74,990 sq ft)
- Website: Official website

KidZania Mumbai is a global indoor theme park, located in R-City Mall, Ghatkopar, Mumbai, India. It is a family entertainment centre for children in the age group of 4 to 16 to enhance their social and cognitive skills. Opened in August 2013, KidZania Mumbai is India's first, and the world's 14th KidZania theme park.

== Overview ==
The Kidzania Mumbai kids park is a real lifestyle theme based games zone for kids aged 4 to 16 years. The park is designed as a miniature city with realistic buildings and structures. The theme park engages kids through roleplaying roles and accomplishing tasks related to those roles. The fun and benefit is paid in task accomplishments.

Children can roleplay as a fireman, a radio jockey or a doctor, perform duties and get credits. Unique to KidZania Mumbai, children can also experience local establishments like the Bollywood Acting Academy, The Pottery Studio and the Dabbawalla service (boxed lunch delivery). KidZania gives children the opportunity to play adult roles by allowing them to roleplay, emulate, re-enact and participate in adult activities and experiences.

== History ==
KidZania was created and developed by Mexican entrepreneur, Xavier López Ancona. The first KidZania opened in September 1999, in Santa Fe Shopping Mall in Mexico City, and was named La Ciudad de los Niños ("The City of the Children"). Today, there are 24 KidZania Theme Parks operational around the world with 10 more to be launched by the end of 2020. KidZania has received more than 35 million guests around the world since its opening, making it one of the fastest growing global edutainment brands in the world.

KidZania has been brought to the domestic market by ImagiNation Edutainment India, which is promoted by Bollywood star Shahrukh Khan, with 26 percent stake, and KidZ Inc of Singapore, which holds the remaining 74 percent. KidZ Inc. is co-owned by the Comcraft, Xander & Maxfield Management Ltd. Groups.

== Age eligibility ==
Children between 4 and 16 years of age can participate in the role-playing activities at KidZania. However, some activities may have a height and age restriction.

Toddlers (aged between 2 and 4 years) have a separate section with play-areas earmarked for them, called Urbano's House, and can participate in some of the role-playing activities.

Babies (below the age of 2 years) can relax and enjoy in the play-areas at Urbano's House.

Adults and parents can observe their children role-playing in various activities, or spend time in the Pepperfry Parents Lounge. There are some establishments, like the Star TV Studio or the Theatre, where they can witness the activities inside the establishments from the seating area. However, adults are not allowed within the KidZania premises, unless they are accompanying children.

== Awards ==
KidZania Mumbai has won many awards from various organisations for value, uniqueness and future potential, including:

- Best Destination for Kids by 4th World Children Expo
- The Best New Concept by Kids by 4th World Children Expo
- The Most Admired Retail Concept Launch of the Year by India Retail Forum 2014
- Emerging Brand Award by Global Marketing Excellence 2014
- Rotary Club of Mumbai Green City Appreciation Award 2014
- Indian Development Foundation CSR Award for year 2013-14

== Industry partners ==
- Air India
- Amity University
- Bajaj Electricals
- Big Bazaar
- Birla Sun Life Insurance
- Cadbury Dairy Milk
- Central
- Club Mahindra
- Coca-Cola
- DHL
- Ezone
- Frooti
- Furtados School of Music
- Godrej Security Solutions
- Hardy's
- HealthSpring
- Hyundai
- Kansai Nerolac Paints
- Kellogg's Chocos
- Kokuyo Camlin
- Mad Over Donuts
- Nutella
- Parachute Advanced
- Parle Products
- Pepperfry
- Radio City
- Sbarro
- Shiamak Davar International
- STAR TV
- The Times of India
- Toonz Animation
- Yes Bank
- Zespri
