= Runwal Realty =

Indian real estate company

- Type: Public
- Industry: Real estate
- Founded: 1978
- Founder: Subhash Runwal
- Headquarters: Mumbai, Maharashtra, India
- Key people: Sandeep Runwal (MD)
- Website: runwalrealty.com

Runwal Developers Limited, d/b/a under the brand name of Runwal Realty, is an Indian real estate development company, headquartered in Mumbai. The company develops residential, commercial, and retail properties, primarily in the Mumbai Metropolitan Region and Pune.

In 2016, Runwal Realty transitioned into an independent entity from the Runwal Group, which was established by Subhash Runwal in 1978. Runwal Realty is led by its MD Sandeep Runwal, who is also the Chairman of National Real Estate Development Council (NAREDCO).

== History ==
The company was established in 1978 by Subhash Runwal. It initially developed affordable apartments, before shifting focus to luxury apartments, mixed-use development, retail and commercial properties.

In April 2003, it opened its first shopping mall, R-Mall in Mulund, Mumbai.

In 2007, the developer established a 50:50 joint venture with Singapore's sovereign wealth fund GIC for the development of R City Mall in Ghatkopar, Mumbai, with a total investment of ₹250 crore (US$26 million). The mall was built on a 28 acre plot acquired from Wyeth Lederle in 2004.

In 2016, Runwal Group was succeeded by two independent entities—Runwal Realty and Runwal Enterprises. Runwal Realty is the brand name of Runwal Developers Limited and led by Sandeep Runwal, while Runwal Enterprises is led by Subodh Runwal.

In 2019, the company formed a 50:50 joint venture with Warburg Pincus in a mixed-use platform to develop and invest in shopping malls.

In May 2023, it bought out GIC's 50% stake in R City Mall for ₹1,000 crore (US$100 million). In November 2023, Runwal Developers bought out Warburg Pincus' 50% stake in their joint venture platform for retail, commercial, and mixed use development for ₹600 crore (US$62 million).

In 2024, the company acquired a 4-acre plot in Worli, Mumbai, from Kansai Nerolac for ₹800 crore (US$83 million), and another 4-acre land parcel in Kanjurmarg, Mumbai, from NITCO for ₹232 crore (US$24 million).

In 2025, the company rebranded as Runwal Realty. Later that year, it filed its draft red herring prospectus (DRHP) with the Securities and Exchange Board of India for its initial public offering to raise ₹2,000 crore (US$210 million).

== See also ==
- List of tallest buildings in Mumbai
- R City Mall
- R-Mall
