= Burgs (fast-food chain) =

Indian fast food chain

- Company type: Private
- Industry: Restaurants
- Genre: Fast food
- Founded: Bandra, Mumbai, India March 22, 2012; 14 years ago
- Founder: Sanjay Kilachand
- Headquarters: Mumbai, Maharashtra, India
- Number of locations: 5 (2013)
- Area served: Mumbai and Pune
- Key people: Subroto Mukherjee (COO)
- Products: Gourmet burgers, french fries, onion rings, salads, ice cream shakes
- Owner: Sanjay Kilachand
- Website: www.burgs.in

Burgs is an Indian fast food chain that mainly serves gourmet burgers including chicken, lamb, fish, prawn, beef and pork, as well as veggie burgers. It also serves ice cream shakes, iced tea, Orangina, B'lue and soft drinks. It is owned by Mumbai-based Sanjay Kilachand. The first Burgs outlet opened on Waterfield Road, Bandra, Mumbai on 22 March 2012. The decor in Burgs's outlets features plastic chairs, tables, bright lighting and colours.

The restaurant's signature burgers are The Burg and The Big Burg. The Big Burg is made of two buffalo tenderloin patties, with béarnaise sauce and caramelized shoe string onions. The Burg is exactly the same, but is made with a single patty. The Times of India described The Big Burg as the company's "equivalent of the Big Mac". Burgs sells some burgers which are compatible with a Jain diet.

Following the opening of the first outlet in Bandra, Burgs opened two more outlets, one each in Mumbai and Pune. Burgs opened its fourth outlet in Carter Road, Bandra on 21 February 2013. A 1200 sq ft outlet, the fourth in Mumbai and fifth overall was opened in R City Mall, Ghatkopar in July 2013. This was Burgs first outlet in a Mumbai mall. The company plans to have 200 stores in India by 2023.

== Advertising ==
Burgs' slogan is "Gourmet Goodness". Following the opening of their fifth outlet in July 2013, Gozoop, a cross-functional digital agency, was assigned the company's social media business. Gozoop's task is to amplify Burgs' social presence and brand awareness. Gozoop had previously organized a five-day-long campaign for the opening of the fifth outlet.

== Locations ==
As of July 2013, Burgs has a total of 5 outlets in India, four in Mumbai and one in Pune.

Mumbai

- Carter Road, Bandra (W)
- Azad Nagar, Veera Desai Road, Andheri (W) (closed)
- JB Nagar, Andheri Kurla Road, Andheri (E)
- R City Mall, Ghatkopar (W)
- Kamla Mills, Lower Parel

Pune

- Amanora Town Centre, Hadapsar

== See also ==
- List of hamburger restaurants
