= Nintendo marketing =

Overview of the various marketing strategies by Nintendo

The video game developer and publisher Nintendo has engaged in a variety of marketing campaigns, ranging from early efforts to appeal to teenagers with "Play It Loud!" to the more open-ended "Who Are You?" campaign. Nintendo also sometimes markets its various consoles and games with lavish promotions.

== Facilities ==
Originally, all marketing operations for Nintendo of America were based out of the company's Redmond, Washington headquarters. It opted not to expand that headquarters, although it owned 550,000 square feet of property for potential expansion. In May 2007, the company announced plans to move its sales, marketing, and advertising divisions to either San Francisco or New York City. The company established its new office in Redwood City, California.

== Personnel ==
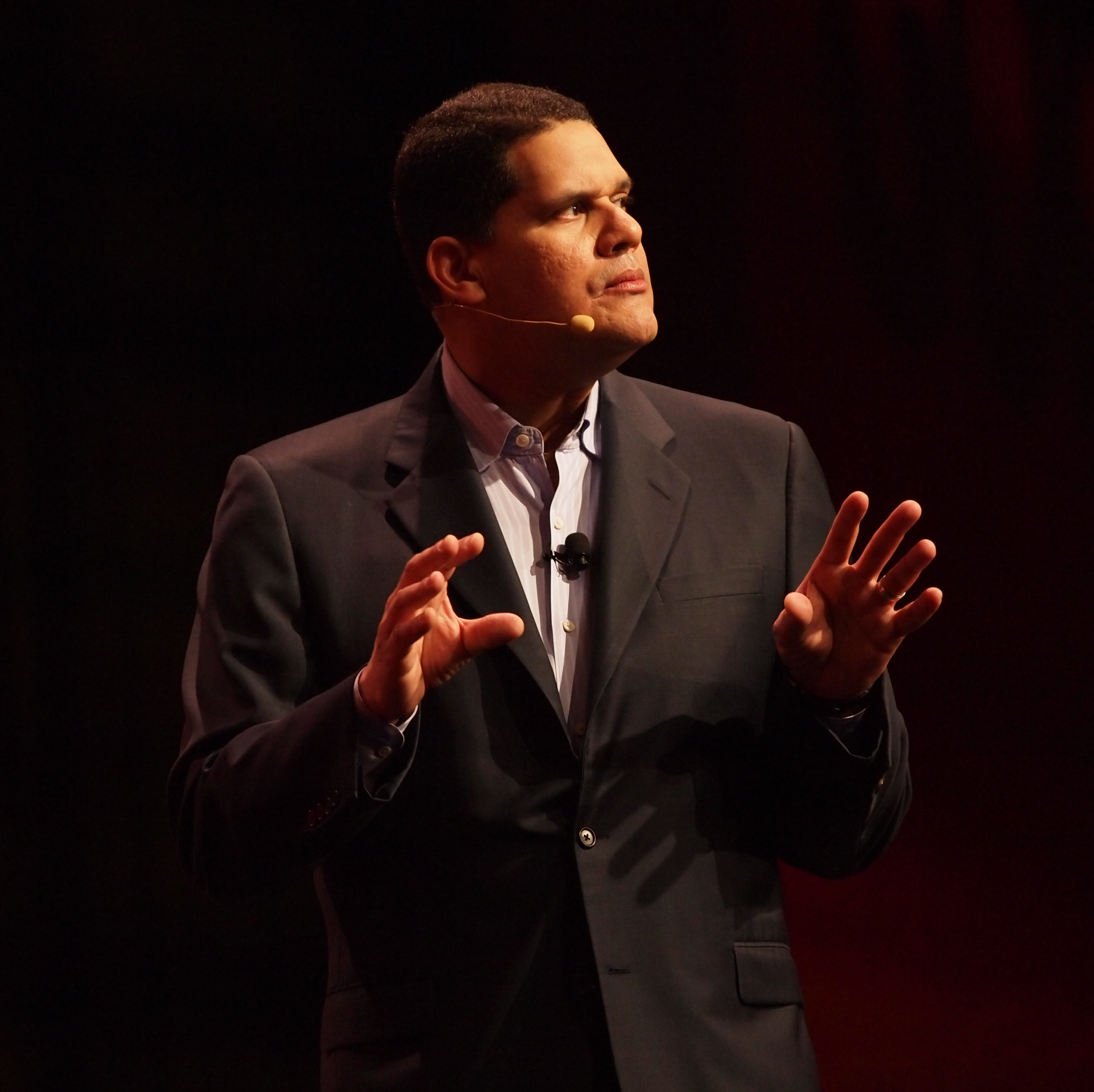
Reggie Fils-Aime

Reginald "Reggie" Fils-Aimé joined Nintendo in December 2003 as the Executive Vice President of Sales and Marketing. He was responsible for all sales and marketing activities for Nintendo in the United States, Canada, and Latin America. Fils-Aimé shot to fame in May 2004 with the opening line of Nintendo's E3 press conference: "My name is Reggie. I'm about kickin' ass, I'm about takin' names, and we're about makin' games." His theatrical antics, flying in the face of Nintendo's long-standing "kiddie" image, gained a cult following soon after, with many gamers calling him the "Regginator". Following the conference, many images of him spread across the Web. Fils-Aimé is considered to be responsible for revamping Nintendo's public relations in North America, leading many fans and members of the press to dub his arrival the "Reggielution" (after "Revolution", the code name for the Wii). He speaks highly of the "blue oceans" strategy, which attempts to bring in people who are not traditionally gamers. His expertise is with youth marketing, although he made an effort to reach out to the elderly using games like Brain Age: Train Your Brain in Minutes a Day! and Nintendogs. In October 2007, Fils-Aimé was promoted to president and chief operating officer of NoA. On February 21, 2019, Fils-Aimé publicly announced that he is now retiring and handing over his presidency of Nintendo of America to Doug Bowser.

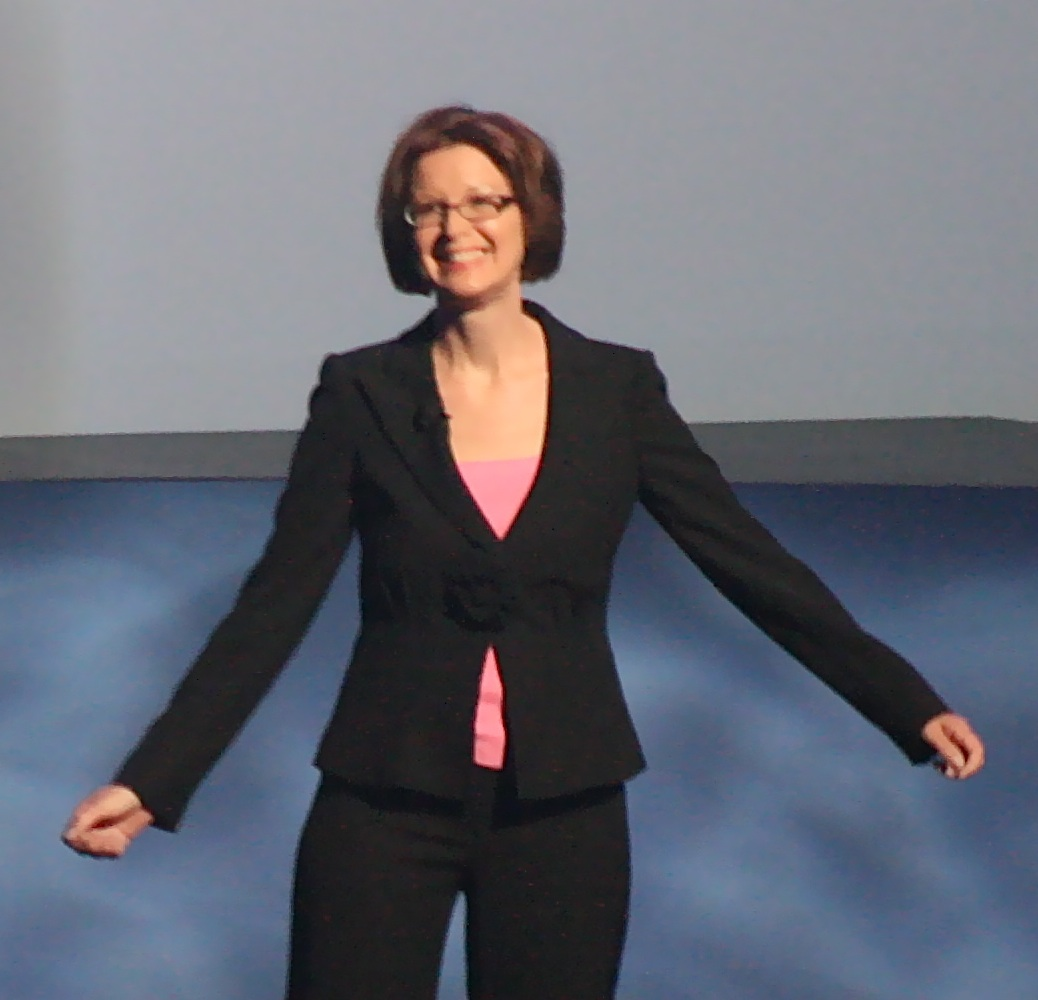
Cammie Dunaway

Cammie Dunaway took up the role following the promotion of Fils-Aimé. Dunaway was named one of the 100 top marketers by Advertising Age. She appeared onstage for Nintendo's E3 2008 press conference, demonstrating Shaun White Snowboarding and Wii Sports Resort. She also made numerous more appearances that day. Dunaway also appeared at Nintendo's E3 2009 press conference. Dunaway left Nintendo of America in October 2010. She joined KidZania as the global chief marketing officer.

Dunaway was succeeded by Scott Moffitt in May 2011. Moffitt previously worked at Henkel and PepsiCo, and was tasked with providing new life to the Nintendo 3DS and Wii. In August 2015, Scott Moffitt was succeeded by Doug Bowser as the Senior Vice President of Sales and Marketing. Bowser had previously been the VP of Sales, coming to Nintendo in 2014 from Electronic Arts.

Nintendo engages non-employees (known as Brand Ambassadors) to do marketing too, an example being NintendoCade Gaming (channel name). In late May 2020, Nintendo dropped several Brand Ambassadors, including Wood Hawker, without giving specific reason.

== Brand campaigns ==
=== The Best Play Here ===
"The Best Play Here" campaign was aimed at children and adults. It was relatively mild and not as emphatic as the "Play It Loud!" campaign that would follow. Leo Burnett U.S.A. produced the campaign.

=== Play It Loud! ===
A poster for the "Play It Loud!" campaign

Facing intense competition from Sega, Nintendo decided to alter the trajectory of its marketing and pitch a new image to the public. The Play It Loud! campaign marked a departure from traditional marketing practice by Nintendo. Instead of focusing on one particular console or game, it promoted a particular corporate image. The campaign was aimed at Nintendo's core market: teenage boys. Dan Coyner, marketing manager at Nintendo of America, noted that previous campaigns felt "like an adult talking to a child," while Play It Loud! appealed more directly to a younger audience. John Montgomery of Burnett said the ads were intended "to capture what kids are in their music, their clothes, their attitudes."

The advertisements extensively used youth slang of the day, advising viewers to "hock a loogie at life" and "give the world a wedgie." They also utilized "provocative imagery," such as a tattoo reading Play It Loud! Advertisements used music extensively, marrying hard rock music with video games. One early advertisement featured the Butthole Surfers, an alternative rock band.

Many were concerned that the campaign would seem too fake, as if adults were trying to pander to children and pretend to be "hip."

The campaign ran from July 1994 to September 1996. It had a $10 million budget and was produced by Burnett.

Nintendo Power released the Play It Loud Original Soundtrack: Volume 1 on April 1, 1996, as a gift to subscribers. It contained 41 tracks of different music from past Nintendo games.

=== Who Are You? ===
"Who Are You?" was a campaign back in 2003 intended on promoting Nintendo's console and handheld systems, the Game Boy Advance and the GameCube. The campaign was developed in conjunction with the Chicago advertising company, Leo Burnett. The promotion would take the form of advertisements in places such as cinemas, print, billboards in major cities, transit, mall banners, and in-store merchandising. There was also an official website containing interactive advertisements of the campaign that has since been taken down.

=== Too Much Fun ===
Nintendo of Canada adopted an ironic approach to marketing itself in 2004. The "Too Much Fun" campaign jokingly presented "N" (short for Nintendo) as an illicit drug. The campaign stated that "Four out of five doctors agree that using 'N' leads directly to Too Much Fun." Its Ministry of Fun Suppression was said to offer possible remedies. As a remedy, the company suggested self-help groups including Nintendo and other fan sites.

== Product campaigns ==
=== Nintendo Entertainment System ===
Nintendo promoted its Nintendo Entertainment System using the slogan, "Now you're playing with power!" It would go on to modify and adapt the slogan for other consoles. It is also important to remark that this slogan was used for several campaigns.

When promoting the miniature, classic NES (titled the Nintendo Entertainment System: NES Classic Edition in the US, Nintendo Classic Mini: Nintendo Entertainment System in Europe and Australia), the original NES slogan was brought back in its YouTube trailer.

=== Super Nintendo Entertainment System ===
In the United States, Nintendo promoted its Super Nintendo Entertainment System using a modification of the slogan for the console's predecessor, "Now you're playing with power; SUPER POWER!" or "Now you're playing with power. Super power." This slogan is also used in a few commercials from the Netherlands and Australia.

In the UK, its commercials promoting the system used this slogan: “Will you ever reach the end?” (stylized on-screen as WILL YOU EVER REACH THE END?).

For the promotion of the SNES Classic Edition, Nintendo used the slogan "Now you're playing with super power."

=== Game Boy ===
The company promoted its Game Boy line using a modification of the slogan used for the Nintendo Entertainment System, "Now you're playing with power; PORTABLE POWER!"

=== Virtual Boy ===
Nintendo extensively advertised the Virtual Boy, and claimed to have spent US$25 million on early promotional activities. Advertising promoted the system as a paradigm shift from past consoles; some pieces used cavemen to indicate a historical evolution, while others utilized psychedelic imagery. Nintendo portrayed the system as a type of virtual reality, as its name indicates; it was to be more than just another gaming console.

Confronted with the challenge of showing 3-dimensional gameplay on 2-dimensional advertisements, the company partnered with Blockbuster and NBC in a coordinated effort. American viewers were encouraged via television advertisements on NBC to rent the console for US$10 at a local Blockbuster. This made it affordable for a large number of gamers to try the system, and produced 750,000 rentals. Despite its popularity, the rental system proved harmful to the Virtual Boy's long-term success, allowing gamers to see just how un-immersive the console was. Nintendo promoted the console using the slogan "A 3-D game for a 3-D World.". In some commercials, Nintendo used its regular slogan "Play it Loud".

Taken as a whole, the marketing campaign was commonly thought of as a failure.

=== Nintendo 64 ===
Nintendo promoted its first 3-dimensional console, the Nintendo 64, using several slogans. One was "Change the System" while the other was "Get N or Get Out" in the United States. In Japan, it used the slogan “ ゲームが変わる、64が変える。 “ (translated as “The game changes, 64 changes.”) for commercials promoting Super Mario 64. In the UK, it used the slogan “Get into it.” in its commercials, while in Germany, a few of its commercials instead used the slogan “The New Dimension of Fun” (translated into German as “Die neue Dimension des Spaßes”).

=== Game Boy Color ===
Nintendo promoted the Game Boy Color using the slogan "Escape to a World of Color" and "Get into It!" with Flying CGI Lips.

=== Game Boy Advance ===
The Game Boy Advance was marketed using the slogan "Life Advanced".

=== GameCube ===
Nintendo used several advertising strategies and techniques for the GameCube. Around the time of release, the GameCube was advertised with the slogan "Born to Play." The earliest commercials displayed a rotating cube animation, which would morph into the GameCube logo as a woman whispers, "GameCube". This was usually displayed at the end of GameCube game commercials. It was also used in the opening of a GameCube demo disc.

=== Nintendo DS ===
In 2005, Nintendo adopted a somewhat controversial tagline to promote its Nintendo DS handheld console. The slogan, "Touching is Good," promoted the unusual touch-based features of the console. A web site created for the promotion awarded prizes to fans. In Japan, the slogan was simply known as "Touch!"

==== Nintendo DS Lite ====
With the launch of the Nintendo DS Lite, Nintendo used the slogan "The world you wish for".

==== Nintendo DSi ====
For the Nintendo DSi, the slogan "What will you and I do?" was used to emphasize the built in camera.

==== Nintendo DSi XL ====
The Nintendo DSi XL was marketed using the slogan "a LARGER experience". This slogan placed emphasis on the larger build of the DSi XL compared to the original DSi.

=== Wii ===
To promote the launch of its unconventional Wii console, Nintendo chose a unique approach to advertising. Rather than appeal to teenage males, Nintendo's traditional audience, the "Wii Would Like to Play" campaign showed people of all ages and backgrounds playing the console. The advertisements made particular note of the Wii's motion control system. The advertising campaign was produced by Leo Burnett, the firm responsible for many past Nintendo campaigns. The campaign won the Grand Effie Award in 2008 for the Most Marketing Effort.

=== Nintendo 3DS ===
Multiple slogans were used to promote the newest model of the DS family, the Nintendo 3DS. The first slogan was "Take a Look Inside" which highlighted the system's 3D gameplay. In May 2016, after Nintendo reduced the price of the Nintendo 2DS, a new slogan, "There's No Play Like It," and accompanying logo was featured.

=== Wii U ===
The Wii U's advertisements involved the "How U will play next" ("How will U play next?" in PAL regions) campaign to show the various play styles of the console.

=== Nintendo Switch ===
The Nintendo Switch's advertising campaign involved the slogan "Switch and Play" to show the versatility of playing the console anywhere. Alternatively, the slogan "Play anywhere, anytime, with anyone" has been used in various European trailers featuring the console.

Due to the lower sales of the Wii U, Nintendo made the decision to focus their advertisements towards an older audience. This decision paid off well. As of March 2025, the Nintendo Switch has sold over 152 million units, far eclipsing the Wii U's lifetime sales of 13.56 million units.

On November 11, 2019, Nintendo published the "Our Favorite Ways to Play-2019" advert, which showcased a young boy with Down syndrome, Aaron Waddingham from Vancouver, Canada, in a commercial for the first time in Nintendo's history.

=== Nintendo Switch 2 ===
The Nintendo Switch 2's advertising campaign involved the slogan "All Together, Anytime, Anywhere." to showcase the new GameChat feature.

Alternatively, the slogan "Now You're Playing Together." was included in a commercial referencing an SNES commercial featuring Paul Rudd, which alluded to the SNES slogan "Now You're Playing With Power. Super power."

=== Nintendo Power ===
Nintendo promoted its magazine, Nintendo Power, using the slogan "Get the power! NINTENDO POWER!"

== Social media ==
Much like other companies in the field, Nintendo uses social media to market their products. They use social media to market their upcoming games and products to a large audience. They also use the platforms to develop and maintain relationships with their customer base on the internet.

=== Twitter ===
Nintendo began using Twitter on April 20, 2007, long before any other social media. Their Twitter account is used to market their upcoming products and games releasing, along with marketing their already released games. Given the more interactive nature of Twitter, fans are able to react and respond to tweets easily, and allows Nintendo to see the feedback and interact with the feedback easier.

As of June 2026, the Twitter page has over 29,000 tweets and 14.6 million followers.

=== Facebook ===
Nintendo began using Facebook on January 1, 2011. They use their Facebook account to create awareness for their upcoming games and products. They also use their Facebook page to interact with fans and potential customers to answer any questions they may have.

As of December 2019, the Facebook page has 5.2 million followers.

=== YouTube ===
Nintendo uploaded their first video to YouTube on January 25, 2011. This first video depicted first reactions and thoughts of the Nintendo 3DS, which was set to debut later in 2011. Nintendo uses their YouTube channel to upload trailers and commercials for their upcoming products and games. They also use YouTube for uploading Nintendo Directs in which they announce and discuss upcoming games and products in more detail. They usually host four or five Directs a year.

As of June 2026, Nintendo has uploaded over 7,400 videos to their channel, and have over 10.1 million subscribers.

=== Instagram ===
Nintendo's first Instagram post came on June 3, 2012. Their first photo depicts Shigeru Miyamoto, Satoru Iwata, and Reggie Fils-Aimé together. Given the nature of Instagram being a photo sharing platform, Nintendo uses the platform to share photos and videos of their products, both upcoming and current. Given the younger demographics of their fan base, more of their fans appear on Instagram as opposed to the older oriented Facebook.

As of December 2019, the Instagram page has 5.9 million followers and over 1,400 posts.

=== Miiverse ===
Miiverse was Nintendo's own social media created for the Wii U and 3DS. It launched on November 18, 2012, alongside the Wii U. The service allowed players to share moments from games, their thoughts on different sections, and allowed interaction between fans of games. The service was integrated with every Wii U game, and eventually every 3DS game once the service came to the platform. Given the younger demographic of Nintendo's fan base, Miiverse also had a younger demographic, and thus was very child-friendly.

Nintendo used the platform to market their own upcoming games, and used word-of-mouth marketing with games that were already released via the communities posts on the game.

Nintendo shut down Miiverse on November 7, 2017, as the service was not integrated on the Nintendo Switch, their new console.

== Demographic shifts ==
Due to negative perceptions of the business viability of video games following the video game crash of 1983, Nintendo decided to position the NES more as a toy than a computing device. This corresponded with targeted marketing towards the demographic of young boys, a choice which set the tone for marketing across the industry for more than a decade.

At the release of the Nintendo DS in 2005, Nintendo attempted to expand the audience toward older males with the sexually suggestive "Touching is Good" advertising campaign. Advertising for the DS later pivoted towards adult women, emphasizing health and productivity while avoiding referring to products as games. Nintendo continued this emphasis on older and female audiences with the Wii console. The Wii's motion controls and casual software helped Nintendo expand its audience, even as many in Nintendo's traditional market regarded the system dismissively. Ben "Yahtzee" Croshaw identified The Legend of Zelda: Majora's Mask as exemplifying the type of complicated game beloved by core gamers that would not be replicated by newer titles emphasizing accessibility.

Nintendo designer Shigeru Miyamoto commented in 2014 that due to the pervasiveness of mobile phone games, Nintendo no longer needed to work at convincing all audiences that games are for them. He further expressed a desire to develop for more engaged audiences who want to challenge themselves. The release of the New Nintendo 3DS, with more complicated controls and launch titles, was seen as a pivot back towards a hardcore gaming audience. This repositioning was a retreat from competition in mobile gaming from smartphones, while Nintendo prepares new health-oriented game devices to once again tap the non-traditional gaming market.

After the disappointing sales of the Wii U, partly due to poor marketing and the rise of mobile phone gaming, Nintendo pushed its latest console, the Nintendo Switch, with strong advertising and promotion. The portable home console aims to appeal to both casual and core gamers, focusing on portability and multiple modes of playing. Nintendo showcased its first-ever Super Bowl ad during Super Bowl LI, with a 30-second advertisement for The Legend of Zelda: Breath of the Wild on the Nintendo Switch.
