= R-Mall =

Shopping mall in Mumbai, India

R Mall is a boutique shopping mall developed by Runwal Realty (legally incorporated as Runwal Developers Ltd). The first R Mall was opened in Mulund in 2003. The second R Mall was opened in Thane in 2010. Runwal Realty’s retail portfolio also includes R City Mall in Ghatkopar West and R Odeon in Ghatkopar East, in addition to the company's residential and commercial projects. In 2016, the erstwhile Runwal Group transitioned into two independent entities–Runwal Realty and Runwal Enterprises. Runwal Realty is led by its managing director, Sandeep Runwal, who is also the chairman of NAREDCO Maharashtra as of 2026.

== R Mall, Mulund ==
R Mall, Mulund was opened in 2003. The 250,000 sq ft (23,000 m^{2}) mall with a frontage of 700 ft (210 m) was designed by Chapman Taylor & Partners (UK). R Mall is a 4-storeyed air-conditioned mall covering an area of approximately 80,000 sq ft (7,000 m^{2}) on each floor. The site includes a 7 level car parking facility. It is the second oldest mall in Mumbai, and the oldest in Mumbai Suburban district.

== R Mall, Thane ==
R Mall, Thane was opened in March 2010 and is located along the 60 m wide Ghodbunder Road in Manpada, Thane. It has a leasable area of 359,000 sq ft (33,000 m^{2}). The property also includes dedicated vehicle parking facilities, and the Manpada metro station is situated outside its premises.
