= Mumbai landslide =

Mumbai landslide may refer to these landslides in Mumbai, Maharashtra, India:

- 2000 Mumbai landslide
- 2021 Mumbai landslide
