= Korea Job World =

Career exploration facility in Seongnam, South Korea

Coordinates: 37.3784°N 127.1062°E

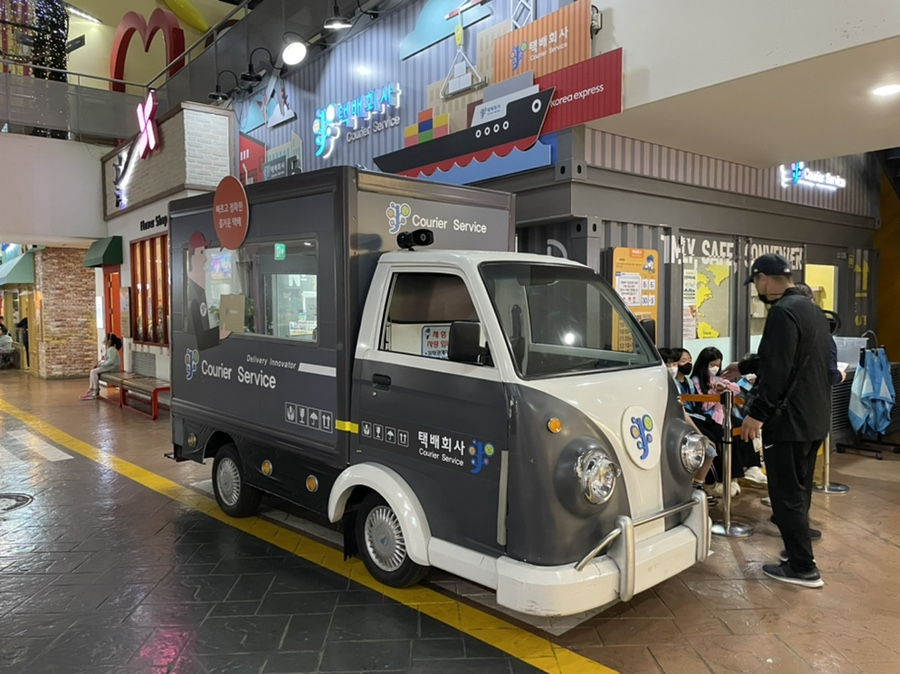
A picture of the career exploration area for children at Korea Job World

Korea Job World (Korean: 한국잡월드) is an indoor career exploration facility in Seongnam, South Korea. Opened in 2012, it provides career planning testing areas where visitors can examine their skills and interests, as well as job experience areas where they get to experience different careers.

== History ==
The South Korean ministry of labor first announced the project in 2004, which was then tentatively called "Job World". It was originally set to finish around 2010 with a cost of ₩205 billion (US$179.2 million). The project was created to allow elementary school aged children to choose their vocational path based on their personal strengths and interests. The project was initially met with some pushback, as unemployment funds were used for funding Korea Job World and there were some budgeting-related concerns. There was also some pushback that was related to a similar job experience model failing before in Japan. In November 2010, the project was further postponed to open during the end of 2011. Korea Job World eventually opened to the public in Seongnam in Gyeonggi Province, South Korea, on May 15, 2012.

In 2022, an additional experience center called "Makive" opened, which offers arts and crafts activities.

== Description ==
Korea Job World has several career experience facilities, including a career planning area, a job experience for younger children, a job experience facility for teenagers, and a job exhibition.

In the job experience facilities, children get to try out different career scenarios to find potential career matches and explore career interests, and in the job exhibitions, visitors see how jobs have evolved from the past as well as how jobs are relevant to people's daily lives. In the career planning area, after taking a test which examines the skills and interests that they have, visitors can see which jobs are the best fit for them based on the results.

Korea Job World has several stages and auditoriums, food courts and convenience stores. Korea Job World also runs a program named ONJOB, which provides online career counseling programs.

== Visits ==
On May 29, 2013, Korea Job World had its millionth visitor, and its 7 millionth visitor in 2023.

Year	Visits	Source
2017	689,683	
2018	666,698	
2019	639,686	
2020	67,026	

== See also ==
- KidZania
