= Jayantilal Parekh =

Indian politician

Jayantilal Gambhirdas Parekh
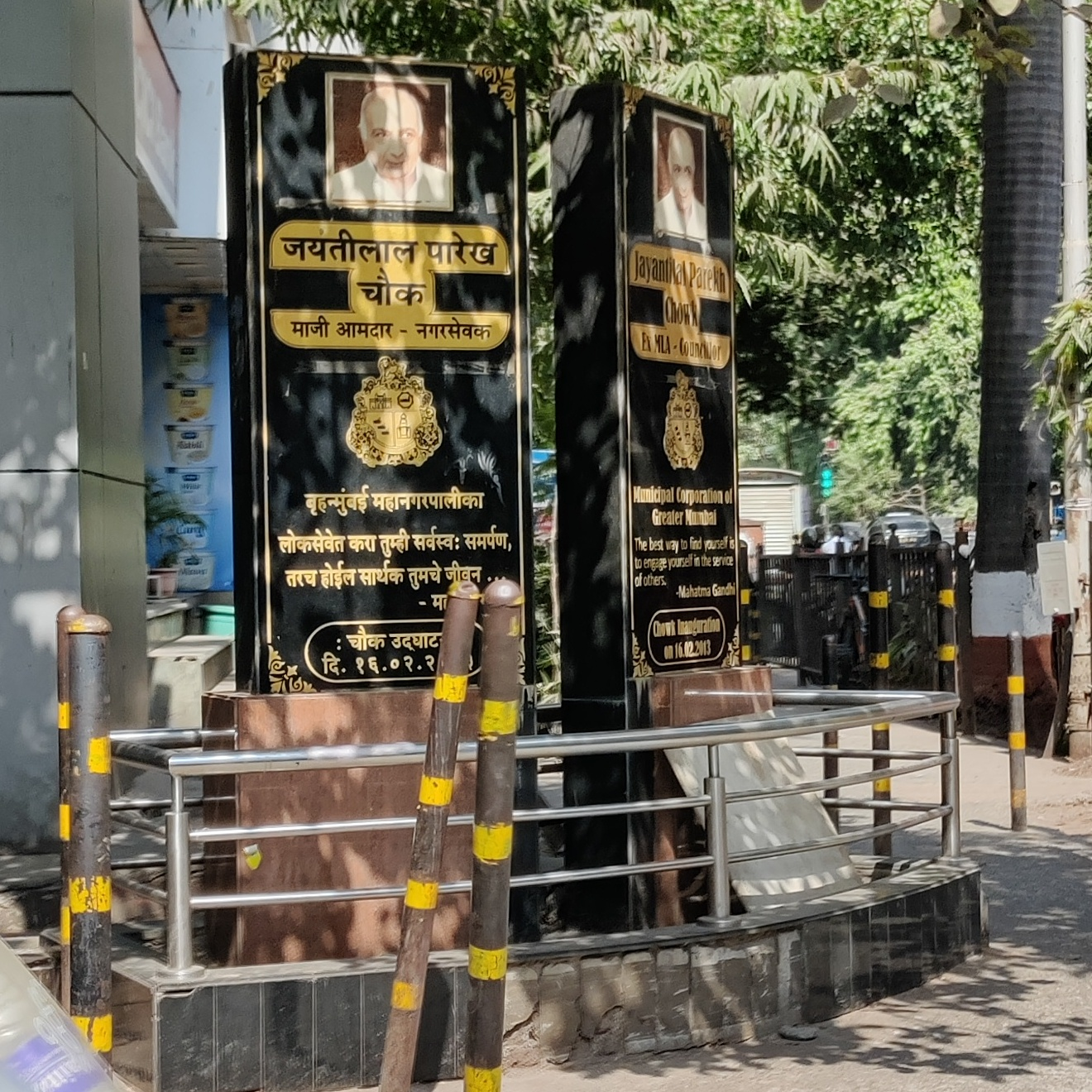
- Jayantilal Parekh Chowk in Ghatkopar, built by MCGM in 2013

Member of Legislative Assembly
- In office 1978–1980
- Constituency: Ghatkopar

Personal details
- Born: 21 May 1946 (age 79)
- Party: Janata Party
- Profession: Politician

Jayantilal Parekh was an Indian politician from Mumbai who served as a Member of Legislative Assembly (MLA) from Ghatkopar. He was from Janata Party. In 1978, he won the assembly election from Ghatkopar assembly constituency. He has also served as the municipal councillor. In 1973, he was elected as municipal councillor from Ward No. 132.
