= Subhash Runwal =

Indian Businessman and Real Estate Mogul

Subhash Runwal is an Indian real estate entrepreneur, founder and chairman of Runwal Group. He has a net worth of $5 billion. Mumbai property tycoon Subhash Runwal chairs the Runwal Group, known for building homes in the city and its suburbs. It also owns several malls and counts the Singapore government's GIC as a key investor in that business. A trained accountant, Runwal was born in a small town in Maharashtra and migrated to Mumbai at age 21. He worked as an accountant for nearly a decade before taking the plunge into real estate in 1978.

== Early life ==
Subhash Runwal was born in a Marwadi Jain family and was one of the five siblings, he left the town of Dhulia and went to study commerce in Pune city. After graduating in commerce, he decided to do his chartered accountancy and moved to Mumbai with less than $2 in his pocket at age 21.

== Runwal Group ==
Subhash Runwal founded his real estate business Runwal Group in 1978 and purchased a 22 acres plot in central suburb of Mumbai.

In 2016, Runwal Group transitioned into two independently operating entities–Runwal Realty and Runwal Enterprises. Runwal Realty is the brand name of Runwal Developers Limited and is led by Sandeep Runwal. Runwal Enterprises is led by Subodh Runwal.

Runwal Realty develops residential, commercial, retail, and mixed-use properties, primarily in the Mumbai Metropolitan Region and Pune. The company formed joint ventures with GIC and Warburg Pincus for its mixed-use and shopping mall development projects.

== Awards ==
- Samaj Ratna Award by President of India 2015

== Associations ==
Subhash serves as president of Jain International Trade Organisation, president of Bharat Jain Mahamandal and treasurer of World Jain. He is trustee of the Mahavir Foundation and Subhash Runwal Education Foundation.

== Family ==
Subhash has two sons and one daughter. His sons Sandeep Runwal and Subodh Runwal joined his real estate business and now run two separate business entities, viz. Runwal Realty and Runwal Enterprises respectively.
