= 2021 Mumbai landslide =

Series of landslides in Mumbai

- Location of Maharashtra in India
- Date: 18 July 2021
- Location: Chembur and Vikhroli of Mumbai, Maharashtra, India
- Cause: Heavy rainfall
- Deaths: 32
- Injuries: 5
- Property damage: Several houses collapsed

The 2021 Mumbai landslide was a series of landslides that occurred in Chembur and Vikhroli, the suburban neighbourhood located in Mumbai, India on 18 July 2021. At least thirty-two people were killed and several others injured after they were trapped under houses that collapsed due to landslides caused by heavy rains. Prime Minister Narendra Modi expressed his grief over the loss of lives and announced ₹2 lakh ex-gratia for family of each deceased victim while a sum of ₹50,000 would be given to the injured from the Prime Minister's National Relief Fund.

The Brihanmumbai Municipal Corporation (BMC) confirmed nearly 120 people around the landslide area in Mahul, Chembur were shifted to safer BMC Schools nearby to avoid casualties in heavy rains.

== Background ==
On 10 June 2021, at least twelve people were killed in a building collapse in Malad, a northern suburb of Mumbai, amid heavy rains and flooding. In September 2020, 39 people were killed when a three-story building collapsed in Bhiwandi, Thane district near Mumbai, during the monsoon.

Deccan Herald reports that landslides are a big killer in the city with 290 people dead and more than 300 injured in the last 29 years due to landslides incidents.

Data from the BMC show that there are 291 landslide-prone areas across Mumbai and more than 50% of them are in the S ward, which comprises Bhandup and Vikhroli area.

== Aftermath ==
The Brihanmumbai Municipal Corporation claimed that it issued warnings to people living in these landslide-prone areas to move to safer places.

Prime Minister Narendra Modi announced an ex-gratia of ₹2 lakh for the kin of each of the victims and compensation of ₹50,000 would be given to the injured. Uddhav Thackeray, the Chief Minister of Maharashtra state announced a compensation of ₹5 lakh to families of those died and that the injured would be treated for free.

== See also ==
- 2000 Mumbai landslide
