= NCP =

NCP may refer to:

== Science and medicine ==
- Novel Coronavirus Pneumonia (a temporary name for COVID-19), an outbreak that was officially identified in late 2019.
- HIV-1 nucleocapsid protein 7 (NCp7), a target of zinc finger inhibitors
- Nucleosome core particle, part of DNA packaging in the nucleosome
- NCP, a protein in involved in chloroplast biogenesis
- National Centre for Physics, a physics research laboratory and facility in Pakistan

== Computing and mathematics ==
- IBM Network Control Program, a program run on IBM programmable communications controllers
- NCP Engineering, a company that produces software for secure data communication
- NetWare Core Protocol, a network protocol used in Novell NetWare
- Network Control Protocol (ARPANET), the original protocol suite of the ARPANET
- Network Control Program (ARPANET), the software in the hosts which implemented that protocol suite
- Network Control Protocol, a protocol that runs atop the Point-to-Point Protocol
- New Cross Pacific Cable System, a submarine cable system in the North Pacific Ocean
- Nonlinear complementarity problem, a kind of a mathematics problem

== Politics ==
- National Centrist Party, a Libyan political party
- National Christian Party, a former Romanian political party
- National Citizen Party, a Bangladeshi political party
- National Coalition Party, a Finnish political party
- National Congress Party (Sudan), a Sudanese political party
- Nationalist Congress Party, an Indian political party
- Nepal Communist Party, a former Nepalese political party
- Nepali Communist Party, a Nepalese political party
- New Communist Party of Britain, a British political party

== Other uses ==
- National Car Parks, a private car park operator in United Kingdom
- North celestial pole, an imaginary point in the sky in the Northern Hemisphere
- National climate projections, climate (change) projections relevant to (and typically produced by) an individual country
- National Consumer Panel, a market research company
- National Contingency Plan, the United States federal government's blueprint for responding to oil spills and hazardous substance releases
- North Central Positronics, a fictional company in The Dark Tower series
- Northside College Preparatory High School, a high-school in Chicago
- IATA code for Naval Air Station Cubi Point
- Noncustodial parent, a parent who does not have custody of their child.
