= FPG IleRS zinc finger =

zf-FPG_IleRS
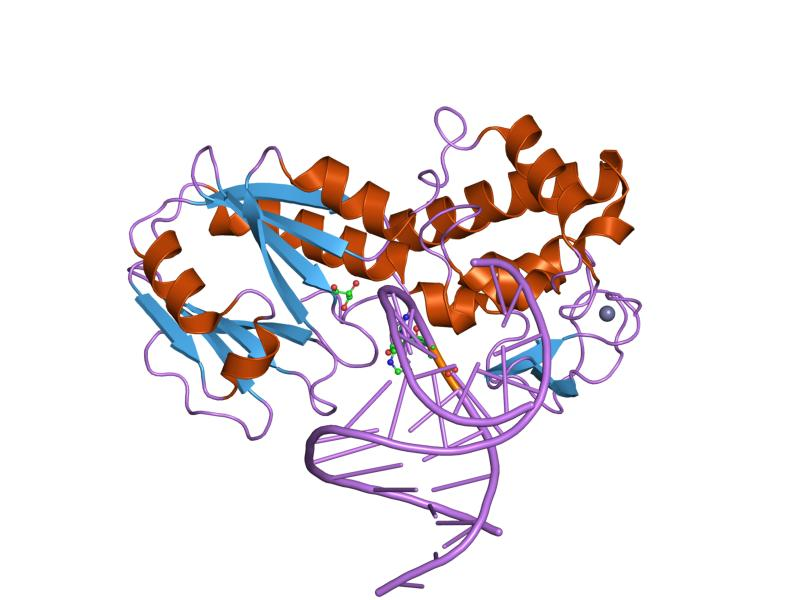
- Crystal structure complex between the lactococcus lactis fpg (mutm) and a fapy-dg containing DNA

Identifiers
- Symbol: zf-FPG_IleRS
- Pfam: PF06827
- Pfam clan: CL0167
- InterPro: IPR010663
- SCOP2: 1qu2 / SCOPe / SUPFAM
Available protein structures:
- Pfam: structures / ECOD
- PDB: RCSB PDB; PDBe; PDBj
- PDBsum: structure summary

The FPG IleRS zinc finger domain represents a zinc finger domain found at the C-terminal in both DNA glycosylase/AP lyase enzymes and in isoleucyl tRNA synthetase. In these two types of enzymes, the C-terminal domain forms a zinc finger.

DNA glycosylase/AP lyase enzymes are involved in base excision repair of DNA damaged by oxidation or by mutagenic agents. These enzymes have both DNA glycosylase activity (EC) and AP lyase activity (EC). Examples include formamidopyrimidine-DNA glycosylases (Fpg; MutM) and endonuclease VIII (Nei). Formamidopyrimidine-DNA glycosylases (Fpg, MutM) is a trifunctional DNA base excision repair enzyme that removes a wide range of oxidation-damaged bases (N-glycosylase activity; EC) and cleaves both the 3'- and 5'-phosphodiester bonds of the resulting apurinic/apyrimidinic site (AP lyase activity; EC). Fpg has a preference for oxidised purines, excising oxidized purine bases such as 7,8-dihydro-8-oxoguanine (8-oxoG). ITs AP (apurinic/apyrimidinic) lyase activity introduces nicks in the DNA strand, cleaving the DNA backbone by beta-delta elimination to generate a single-strand break at the site of the removed base with both 3'- and 5'-phosphates. Fpg is a monomer composed of 2 domains connected by a flexible hinge. The two DNA-binding motifs (a zinc finger and the helix-two-turns-helix motifs) suggest that the oxidized base is flipped out from double-stranded DNA in the binding mode and excised by a catalytic mechanism similar to that of bifunctional base excision repair enzymes. Fpg binds one ion of zinc at the C terminus, which contains four conserved and essential cysteines. Endonuclease VIII (Nei) has the same enzyme activities as Fpg above, but with a preference for oxidized pyrimidines, such as thymine glycol, 5,6-dihydrouracil and 5,6-dihydrothymine.

An Fpg-type zinc finger is also found at the C terminus of isoleucyl tRNA synthetase (EC). This enzyme catalyses the attachment of isoleucine to tRNA(Ile). As IleRS can inadvertently accommodate and process structurally similar amino acids such as valine, to avoid such errors it has two additional distinct tRNA(Ile)-dependent editing activities. One activity is designated as 'pre-transfer' editing and involves the hydrolysis of activated Val-AMP. The other activity is designated 'post-transfer' editing and involves deacylation of mischarged Val-tRNA(Ile).
