= Cammie Dunaway =

American marketer

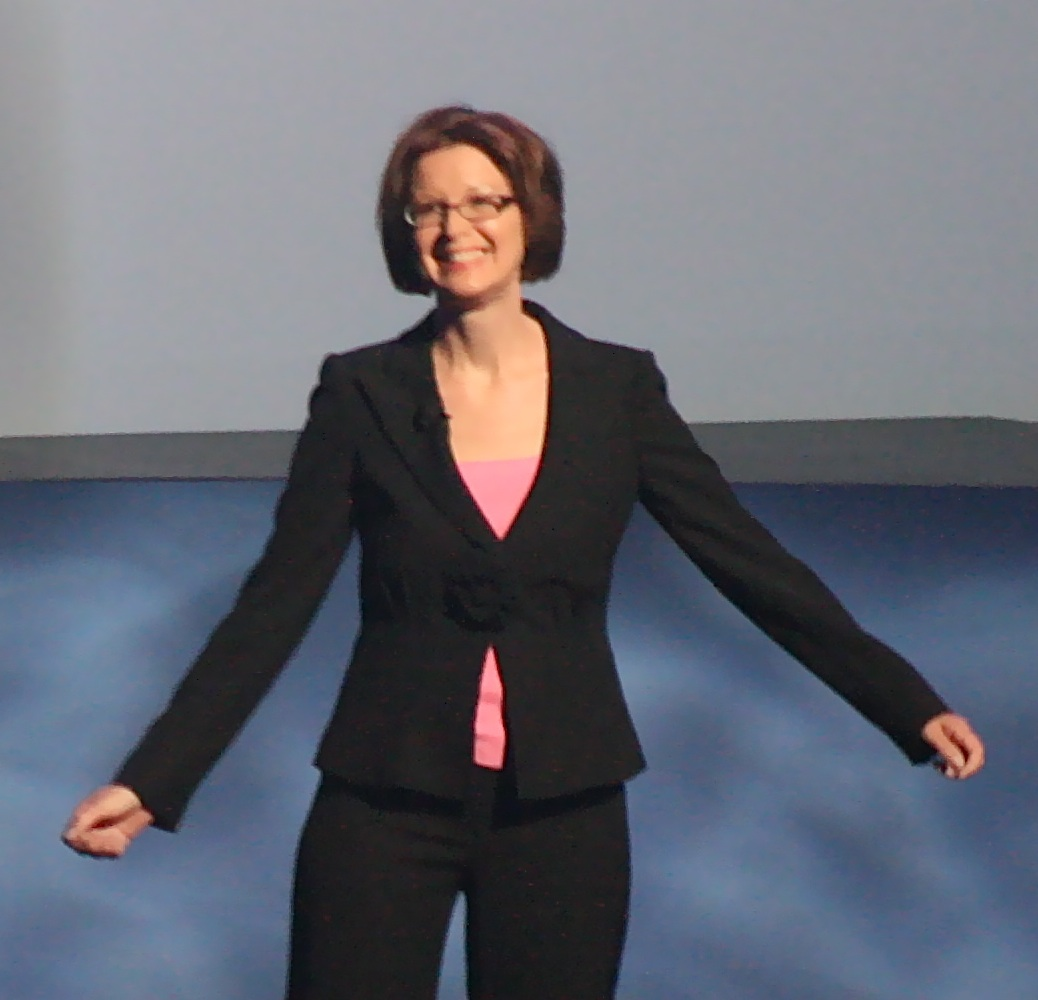
- Dunaway at E3 2008
- Born: 1963 (age 62–63)
- Education: University of Richmond
- Children: 1

Cammie Dunaway is an American marketer. She was the chief marketing officer for Yahoo! before joining Nintendo of America in 2007 as the company's executive vice president of sales & marketing, replacing Reggie Fils-Aimé in the role after he was promoted to his position as president and COO of the company. Before joining Yahoo! in 2003, she worked for Frito-Lay for 13 years.

== Personal life ==
Dunaway was born in Winston-Salem, North Carolina. Dunaway holds a Bachelor of Science in business administration from the University of Richmond and an M.B.A. from Harvard Business School.

== Career ==
Dunaway was named one of the 100 top marketers by Advertising Age. She appeared onstage for Nintendo's E3 2008 press conference, demonstrating Shaun White Snowboarding and Wii Sports Resort. She also made numerous more appearances that day. Dunaway also appeared at Nintendo's E3 press conference in 2009.

Dunaway left Nintendo of America in October 2010. She joined KidZania as the global chief marketing officer.

In 2018 she joined Duolingo as Chief Marketing Officer.
