= Xavier López Ancona =

Mexican entrepreneur

Xavier López Ancona is a Mexican entrepreneur. He is the founder, president and chief executive officer of KidZania since its inception in 1999. López was ranked in the list of the most successful entrepreneurs in Mexico according to Forbes. Prior to his current position, he was the director of venture capital for General Electric Capital. He has a bachelor's degree in Business Administration from Anahuac University, a master's degree in administration from the Pan-American Institute of Business Administration (IPADE) in Mexico, and an MBA from the Kellogg Graduate School of Management at Northwestern University.

== Personal life ==
Xavier Lopez Ancona Martinez was born in Mexico City. His father, Isidro Lopez Martinez, worked at a variety of businesses, largely in the food industry and real estate. His mother was a housewife who raised seven children. As child, he wanted to be a magician, and performed in nursing homes and orphanages. He later did a year of high school in Tulsa, Oklahoma.

López comes from a large family. He has no children, but he has 16 nephews and enjoys taking them on trips, skiing and diving.

== Education ==
López has a bachelor's degree in business administration from Anahuac University in Mexico City, a master's degree in administration from the Pan-American Institute of Business Administration (IPADE), and an MBA from the Kellogg Graduate School of Management at Northwestern University.

== Business career ==
When his father's real estate company in the San Juan Ixhuatepec area went bankrupt in 1984, López supported his father. As a result, he was given the task of selling most of the properties to avoid large losses.

López studied marketing under Philip Kotler, while working toward his master's degree. Kotler's classes, leadership and knowledge were key factors when López decided to start and launch the concept of KidZania. In 1999, Ancona founded Kidzania with the goal of making entertainment inclusive, as well as to increase its educational value. One of the most important lessons López learned during the process of taking KidZania from an entrepreneurial project to a multinational company was that businesses and cities are highly intertwined.

== Kidzania ==
Kidzania has had 10 million site visits to date as of May 2017. Due to the success of the Mexico City park, López plans to open more parks in the U.S.
