= Zinc finger inhibitor =

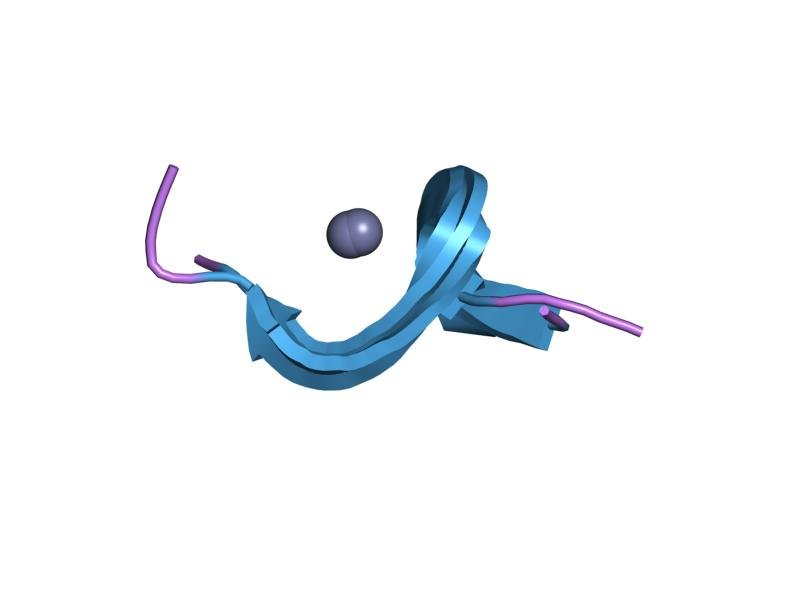
This image shows the typical structure of NCp7, which is targeted by zinc finger inhibitors when combating HIV.

Zinc finger inhibitors, or zinc ejectors, are substances or compounds that interact adversely with zinc fingers and cause them to release their zinc from its binding site, disrupting the conformation of the polypeptide chain and rendering the zinc fingers ineffective, thereby preventing them from performing their associated cellular functions. This is typically accomplished through chelation of the zinc binding site. As zinc fingers are known to be involved in m-RNA regulation, reverse transcription, protection of synthesized viral DNA, transcription inhibition, and initial integration processes, prevention of zinc finger function can have drastic effects on the function of the cell or virus.

Zinc finger inhibitors are typically used to combat HIV. HIV treatments usually rely on targeting reverse transcriptases and proteases. However, these methods are proving to be ineffective due to the development of resistant strains of the virus or due to the stoppage of the treatment. This method of using zinc finger inhibitors to target and destabilize zinc fingers represents a new method of fighting HIV. Other viruses such as SARS, polio, Ebola, measles, human coxsackie, Dengue, rabies, human hepatitis, human parainfluenza and human respiratory syncytical have similar zinc finger motifs and could potentially benefit from zinc finger inhibitor technology.

Zinc ejectors were patented in 2008 and some have entered Phase I/II trials as a HIV drug.

== Zinc Finger Inhibitor Target: Nucleocapsid Protein ==
The HIV-1 nucleocapsid protein 7 (NCp7) is the protein targeted by zinc ejectors. NCp7 is initially formed as part of the gag polypeptide and follows a gag-knuckle zinc finger conformation. In its lifetime, NCp7 facilitates the unwinding of tRNA, acts as a primer for reverse transcription, chaperones nucleic acids within the capsid of HIV-1, helps integrate the viral RNA into budding virions, and is intimately involved in the replication of HIV-1 in both the early phase and late phase. These processes play critical roles in the replication of HIV-1 thus making NCp7 a prime target for drugs seeking to contravene the replication process.

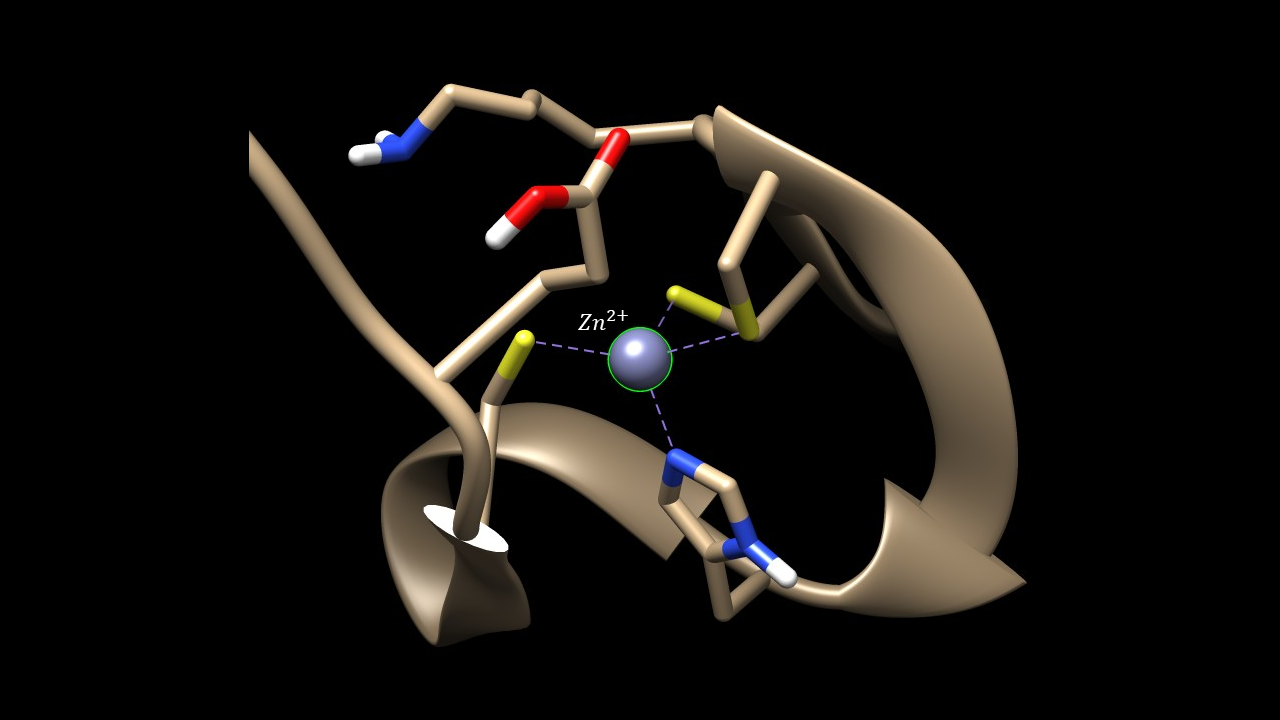
This image shows the zinc finger structure of the HIV-1 nucleocapsid protein. The cysteines of the CCHC motif are given in yellow; the histidine in blue. The dashed lines represent the coordinate bonds between the Zn ion and the respective residues.

NCp7 is a 55-amino acid protein that is highly basic and consists of two gag-knuckle motifs. These motifs contain two peptide units of Cys-X2-Cys-X4-His-X4-Cys (CCHC), where the X represents a substituted amino acid, that make up the zinc(II) ion binding sites. The binding of zinc(II) in the CCHC binding site is necessary for the domain to be functional and for the stabilization of the conformation of the structure, allowing the NCp7 to carry out the processes required for HIV replication. Since the CCHC binding site is mutation resistant and involved in the replication of HIV-1, it makes a prime candidate for the prevention of HIV through zinc ejectors. By inhibiting the function of NCp7, the viral replication is affected and a non-functional virus that is unable to infect its host is produced.

== Zinc Ejector Compounds ==
=== Azodicarbonamide ===
Azodicarbonamide (ADA) was the first zinc ejector to go into clinical trial for treatment of HIV. ADA inhibits HIV by electrophilically attacking the sulfur atoms of the zinc coordinated cysteine. This electrophilic interaction destabilizes the zinc binding site making it easier for the zinc ion to be withdrawn due to the new arrangement of bonds. The binding site then performs a disulfide exchange, forming new intermolecular disulfide bonds, and rearrangement occurs placing the zinc finger in a conformation that inhibits its function.

=== C-nitroso ===
3-nitrosobenzamide (NOBA) and 6-nitroso-1,2-benzopyrone (NOBP) were the first compounds to demonstrate an ability to inhibit infection of HIV by ejecting zinc from NCp7. In the same manner as ADA, the compounds interact with an 18-residue polypeptide on the N terminal zinc knuckle region of the HIV nucleocapsid protein which causes ejection of the zinc from the region by covalently modifying the cysteine residues. Studies suggest that NOBA and NOBP were able to inhibit HIV-1 infection by inhibiting reverse transcription without an apparent impairment of reverse transcriptase. This reiterates the role of NCp7 in reverse transcription.

=== 2,2’-di-thiobisbenzamide (DIBA) ===
DIBAs act similarly to ADA, NOBA and NOBP. They react with the cysteine residues on the zinc finger of the NCp7 and cause a covalent conformation change which ejects the zinc from the zinc finger domain. Though DIBAs initially seemed to be promising antiviral candidates, there were clinical issues with their stability. DIBAs tend to cyclize into benzisothiazolones which do not have the same potency when used to combat retroviruses as the original compound. Additionally, glutathione can reduce the disulfide bonds in DIBA thereby restricting its function in vitro.

=== Mercaptobenzamides ===
Mercaptobenzamide prodrugs transfer acyl group to 36th cysteine residue of NCp7 and the acyl group then migrates to neighboring lysine residue that triggers the ejection of Zn. The mercaptobenzamide and its corresponding prodrug yielded additivity to synergy when combined with known HIV drugs. Moreover they showed no cytotoxicity.

=== Pyridinioalkanoyl thiolesters (PATES) ===
N-[2-(5-pyridiniovaleroylthio)benzoyl]sulfacetamide bromide (referred to as compound 45) is a pyridinioalkanoyl thiolester that can function as a zinc ejector. Once activated with silver, compound 45 uses its pyridinioalkanoyl groups to covalently modify NCp7, specifically altering cysteines 36 and 49 on the carboxyl-terminal zinc finger. It ejects the zinc from the zinc binding sites in a two steps. The zinc in the carboxyl-terminal zinc finger is released first, followed by the ejection of zinc from the amino-terminal zinc finger.

=== Bis-Thiadizolbenzene-1,2-Diamine ===
Bis-Thiadizolbenzene-1,2-diamine (NV038) is one of the newer zinc ejectors. NV038 is found to effect the function of the zinc finger after the virus has entered the cell but before reverse transcription is completed. NV038, like other zinc ejector compounds, chelates zinc to remove it from its binding site. However, it is thought to act through a different mechanism than many of the other zinc ejectors due to its structural features. Its structure would not readily allow thiol-disulfide interchange or acyl transfer to cysteine. Instead, NV038 is believed to react with the zinc using its two carbonyl oxygens found in the esters.

== Safety Concerns ==
There was concern over whether these zinc ejectors were safe to use due to the uncertainty as to whether the zinc ejectors had sufficient selectivity to target only the CCHC binding sites of the zinc fingers in NCp7. Zinc finger domains are not unique to HIV but rather are ubiquitous in cell biology, and play important roles in many processes such as cellular replication, protein-protein interactions, and DNA replication. If these zinc ejectors unintentionally bind to the wrong zinc finger domains they have the potential to adversely affect other cellular functions that could be essential for proper bodily functions.

Experimentation and modeling of the selectivity of DIBA-1, ADA, and other zinc ejectors found that this safety concern was essentially unfounded. All zinc ejectors were found to effectively combat the replication of HIV at concentrations that did not exhibit cytotoxic effects denoting that they specifically targeted NCp7 and did not target other zinc fingers. It is thought that factors such as ligand binding affinity, ligand reactive proximity, and the general saddleshape necessary for the compound to fit into the binding pocket all play a role in the selectivity shown by zinc ejectors.
