= Manpada =

Village in Maharashtra

- village
- Location in Maharashtra, India Manpada (India)
- Coordinates: 20.0994845°N 72.8500709°E
- Country: India
- State: Maharashtra
- District: Palghar
- Taluka: Talasari
- Elevation: 49 m (161 ft)

Population (2011)
  - Total: 949
- Time zone: UTC+5:30 (IST)
- 2011 census code: 551563

Manpada is a village in the Palghar district of Maharashtra, India. It is located in the Talasari taluka.

== Demographics ==
According to the 2011 census of India, Manpada has 188 households. The effective literacy rate (i.e. the literacy rate of population excluding children aged 6 and below) is 60.23%.

Demographics (2011 Census)
	Total	Male	Female
Population	949	439	510
Children aged below 6 years	152	71	81
Scheduled caste	1	1	0
Scheduled tribe	944	434	510
Literates	480	274	206
Workers (all)	411	229	182
Main workers (total)	233	131	102
Main workers: Cultivators	72	44	28
Main workers: Agricultural labourers	49	23	26
Main workers: Household industry workers	4	2	2
Main workers: Other	108	62	46
Marginal workers (total)	178	98	80
Marginal workers: Cultivators	2	2	0
Marginal workers: Agricultural labourers	167	90	77
Marginal workers: Household industry workers	2	1	1
Marginal workers: Others	7	5	2
Non-workers	538	210	328
