= R City Mall =

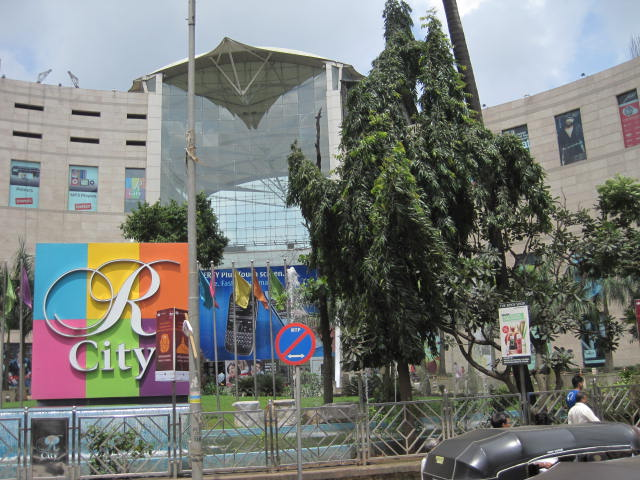
- Location: Ghatkopar, Mumbai
- Coordinates: 19.0908°N 72.9077°E
- Opened: 2009
- Developer: Runwal Realty
- Num. of stores: 350
- Floors: 12 floors (2B + G + 9)
- Website: rcity.in

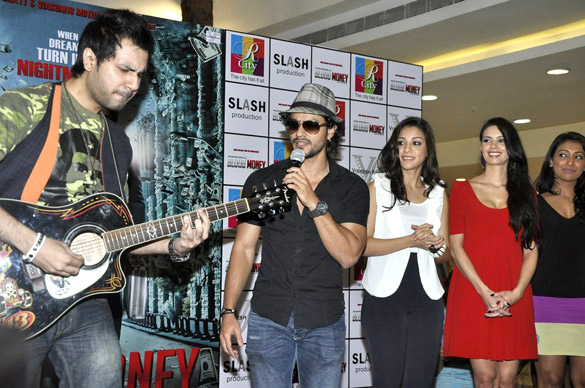
Promotions of Bollywood film Blood Money at R City Mall

R City Mall is a shopping mall located in Ghatkopar West, Mumbai. The mall spreads across 1.2 million square feet with the capacity to house over 350 stores. The mall has over 250 shopping stores, including food outlets, entertainment areas, and a multiplex (INOX). The mall was opened in two phases, now known as the southern and northern end and the total size of the first phase of the development is 7.5 lakh square feet. It is a project developed by Runwal Developers Ltd (d/b/a Runwal Realty).

== History ==
R City Mall opened in 2009 and was established as a 50:50 joint venture between Runwal Realty and Singapore's sovereign wealth fund GIC, with a total investment of ₹250 crore. The joint venture was led by Sandeep Runwal. In May 2023, Runwal Realty bought out GIC's 50% stake in R City Mall for ₹1,000 crore.

== About ==
R City Mall is part of Runwal Realty's retail portfolio, which also includes R Mall in Thane, R Mall in Mulund, and R Odeon in Ghatkopar East, in addition to the company's residential and commercial projects. Runwal Realty transitioned into an independent entity from the erstwhile Runwal Group in 2016, and is led by its managing director, Sandeep Runwal, who is also the chairman of NAREDCO Maharashtra as of 2026.

== See also ==
- List of shopping malls in India
- Ghatkopar
