= 2000 Mumbai landslide =

Landslide in Mumbai, India

Coordinates: 19°5′27″N 72°53′46″E

- Location of Maharashtra in India
- Date: 12 July 2000
- Location: Mumbai, Maharashtra, India
- Deaths: 78
- Injuries: unknown

The 2000 Mumbai landslide was a landslide that occurred in Ghatkopar, a suburban neighbourhood located in Mumbai, India on 12 July 2000. Seventy-eight people, including twenty-seven men, fifteen women, and fifteen children, were killed, while seven more were injured. Most of the victims were residents of the Mumbai slums, where building and sanitation conditions are very poor. Government officials promised that the immediate family of each deceased victim would receive Rs 25,000 from the government, while the immediate family of each injured would receive Rs 10,000. Over one hundred and fifty firefighter personnel participated in search and rescue efforts, though officials reported little hope of finding any more survivors two days after the initial landslide occurred. The landslide was caused by land erosion, following heavy rains and subsequent flooding that coincided with a high tide in the Arabian Sea. According to meteorologists, more than three hundred and fifty millimeters of rain fell on the suburbs of Mumbai in the twenty-four-hour period before the landslide. In the years since the 2000 Mumbai landslide, Mumbai has been determined by the Municipal Corporation Building to contain 327 areas that are in danger of landslides, including 49 in the city and 278 in the suburbs. Since this revelation, thousands of huts have been relocated or reinforced to protect the inhabitants from landslides.
