= KidZania =

International indoor entertainment chain

Coordinates: 19.36106°N 99.2802°W

- Formerly: La Ciudad de los Niños (1999–2006)
- Type: Family entertainment center
- Industry: Entertainment venue
- Founded: 1 September 1999; 27 years ago
- Founder: Luis Javier Laresgoiti; Xavier López Ancona
- Headquarters: Cuajimalpa, Mexico
- Number of locations: 28
- Area served: Mexico; Chile; Egypt; India; Indonesia; Japan; South Korea; Kuwait; Malaysia; Portugal; Qatar; Russia; Saudi Arabia; Singapore; Turkey; United Arab Emirates; United States; Vietnam
- Website: kidzania.com

KidZania (English: /kɪdˈzeɪniə/ kid-ZAY-nee-ə; Spanish: [kidˈsa.nja]) is a Mexican privately-held chain of indoor family entertainment centers. Its locations are themed as child-sized replicas of real cities that allow children to role play adult jobs and earn play currency.

The first KidZania opened in September 1999 as La Ciudad de los Niños (transl. The City of Children) in the Santa Fe Shopping Mall in Mexico City. According to KidZania in 2020, it operates 30 locations worldwide and receives over 9 million visitors per year.

== Overview ==
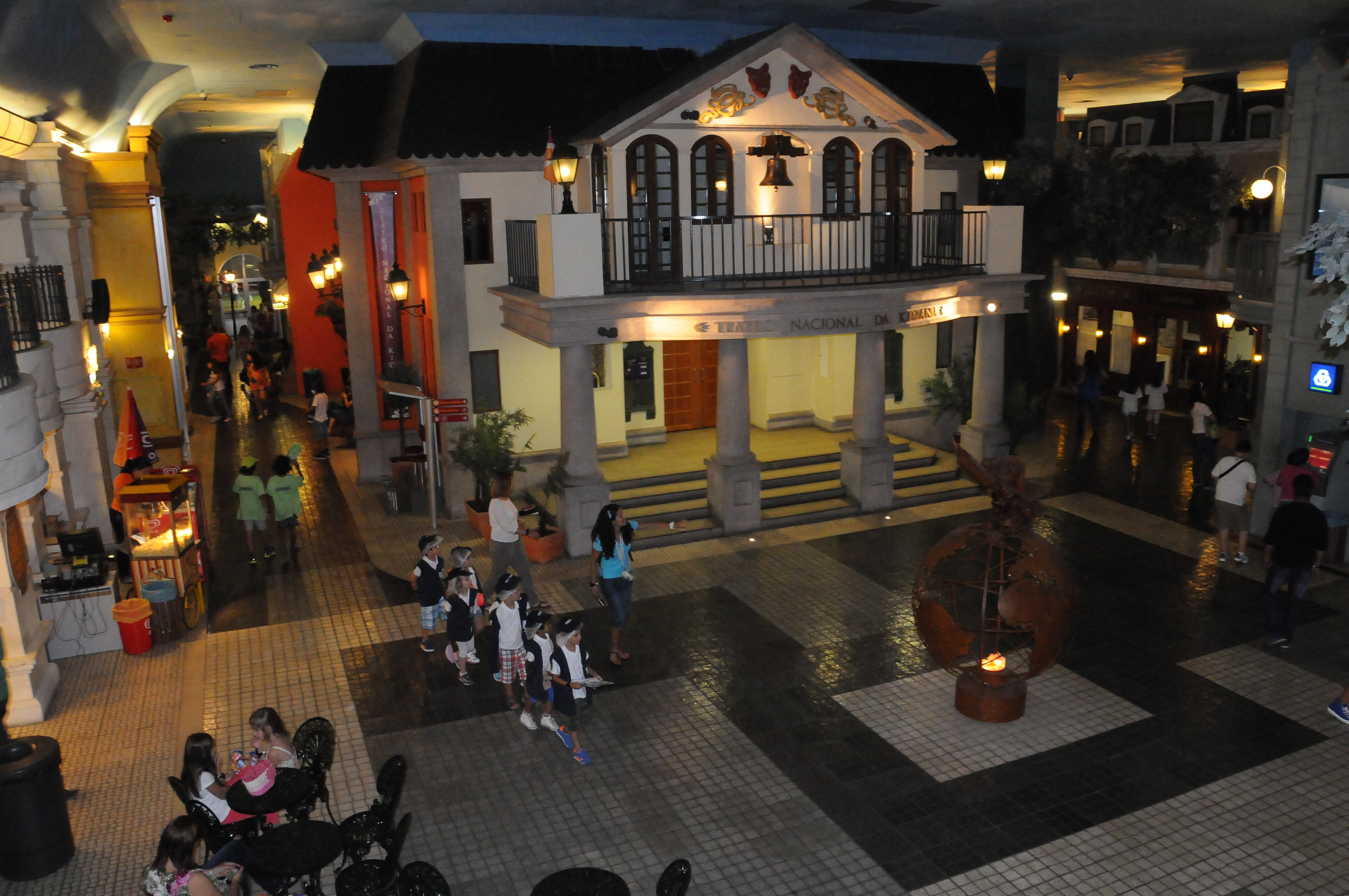
KidZania, Lisbon, 2014

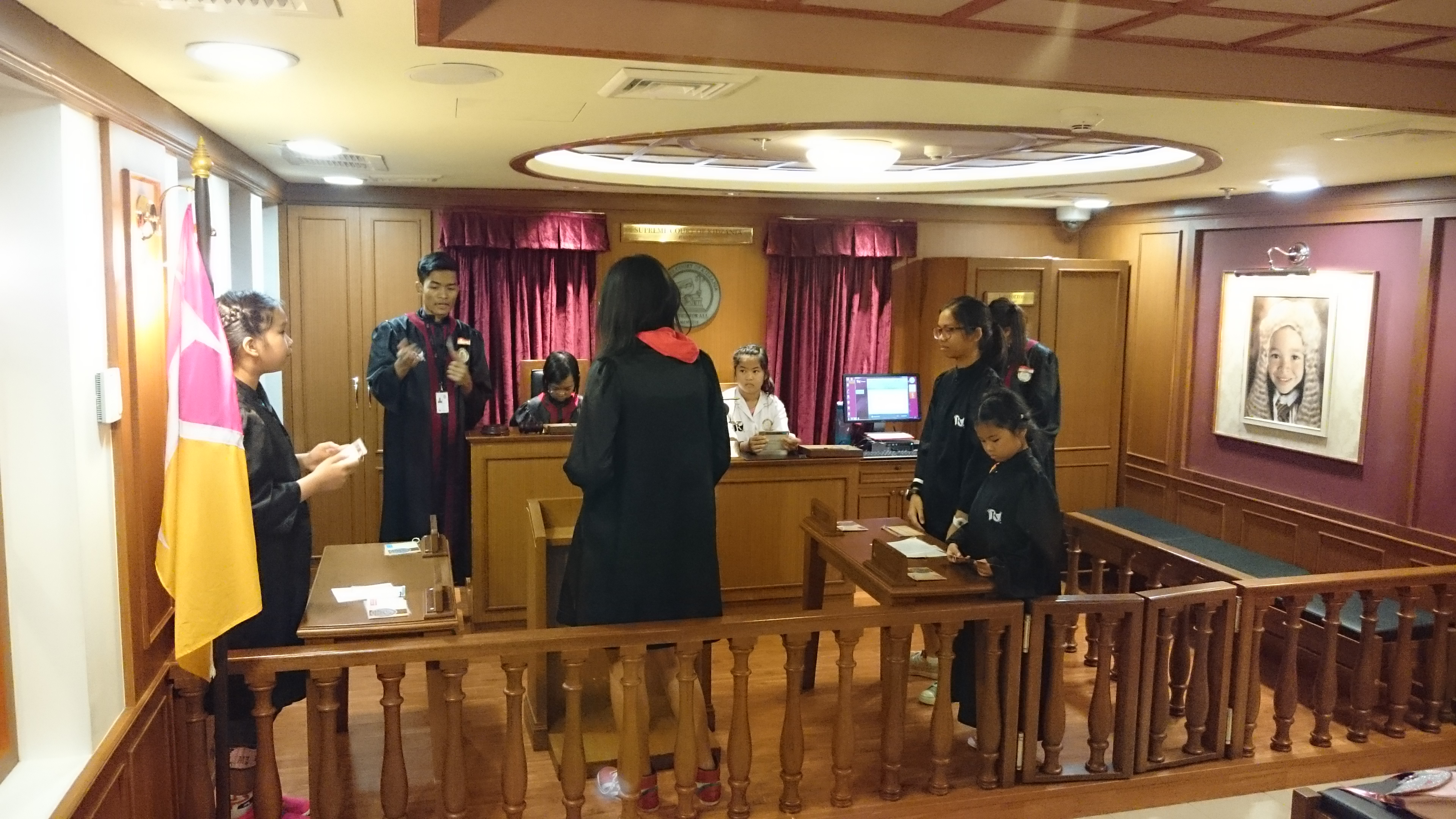
Mock Court, KidZania Bangkok, 2015

Every KidZania is themed as a child-sized replica of a real city, including buildings, shops and theaters, as well as vehicles and pedestrians moving along its streets. In this city, children aged 4 through 14, work in branded activities from bottling Coca-Cola, working in a Crest-sponsored dentist office, working at a McDonald's restaurant, painting with Corporação Industrial do Norte, washing hands with P&G's Safeguard soap, and using airline tickets from American Airlines, Flydubai, Egyptair and Saudia.

While working, the children earn kidZos, KidZania's play currency, and the money is kept in the KidZania bank for children to spend at the gift shop and on KidZania's activities. Inside every KidZania facility around the world, children wear electronic bracelets that allow parents to keep track of their kids remotely.

Bollywood actor Shah Rukh Khan owns a 26% share in KidZania India and helps promote the brand in India.

== History ==
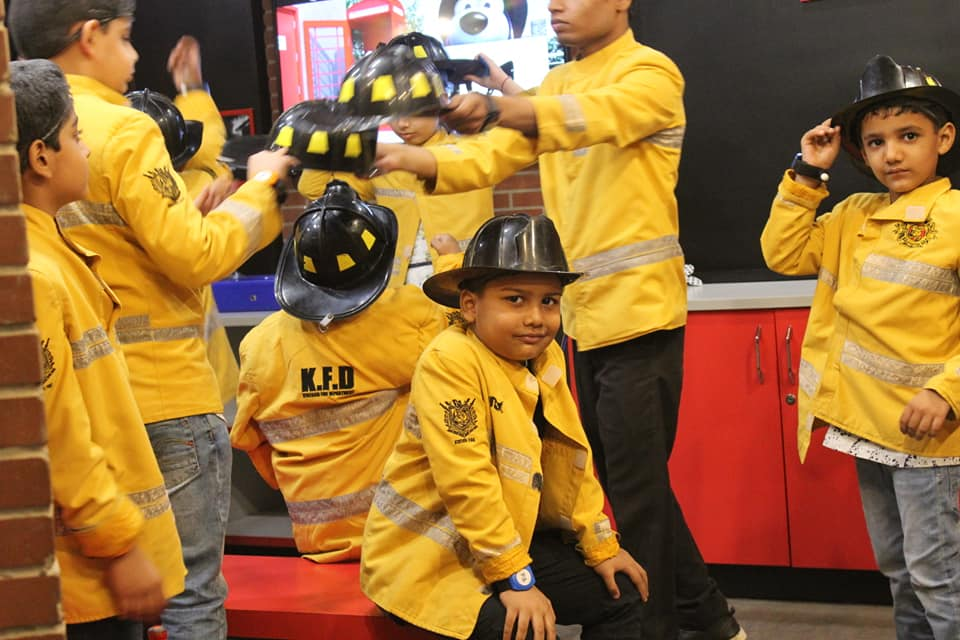
Fireman activities at KidZania, Noida

KidZania was created and developed by the Mexican entrepreneur Luis Javier Laresgoiti, alongside his business partner Xavier López Ancona, the current KidZania CEO. The first KidZania opened in September 1999 in Santa Fe Shopping Mall in Mexico City and was named La Ciudad de los Niños (transl. The City of Children). Corporate sponsors funded 55% of the initial investment. This was done as while the original plans were to be to generically name or give no name to the establishments, by then Lopez Ancona and Laresgoiti had exhausted their savings to fund construction, so they turned to having real world businesses sponsor the businesses in the city.

Shortly after the first center's successful opening, Luis Javier Laresgoiti and Xavier López Ancona became split on how to continue the business. In August 2001, it was announced that López would lead La Ciudad de los Niños and establish locations in California, Mexico, and Spain. Laresgoiti and his partner company Grupo Mágico would establish locations in Miami and South America, paying La Ciudad de los Niños 0.25% of the locations' revenue for the next 5 years. López's plans to open a Monterrey, Mexico location were postponed as he tried to establish Kids City locations at a Los Angeles mall and at the Palisades Center, both of which fell through. The Los Angeles location fell through because of difficulties involving the project itself, while the Palisades Center location was rejected by local voters because since it was to be labeled as a theme park, fears arose of issues such as traffic in the area.

Laresgoiti and Grupo Mágico, alongside the Mills Corporation, were able to begin construction on a center at Sawgrass Mills under a different brand, Wannado City, which opened in 2004. In 2003, La Ciudad de los Niños filed a lawsuit against Wannado Entertainment for infringing their intellectual property, and rejected Grupo Mágico's attempts to settle the lawsuit. Shortly after Wannado City opened, Wannado paid a settlement to La Ciudad de los Niños to end the lawsuit, and was forbidden from opening Wannado City locations in Mexico.

In 2006, La Ciudad de los Niños rebranded as KidZania to better suit itself for international expansion, and opened its second location in Monterrey. The following year, KidZania hired entertainment strategist Andrew Darrow as executive vice president. The same year would see KidZania's first international location in KidZania Tokyo. Cammie Dunaway, previously of Yahoo! and Nintendo, joined in late 2010 as the chief marketing officer.

KidZania at Westfield London, cost £20 million to build. In partnership with British Airways, it was operated by Joel Cadbury and Ollie Vigors through their Longshot Ltd company.

== Gallery ==
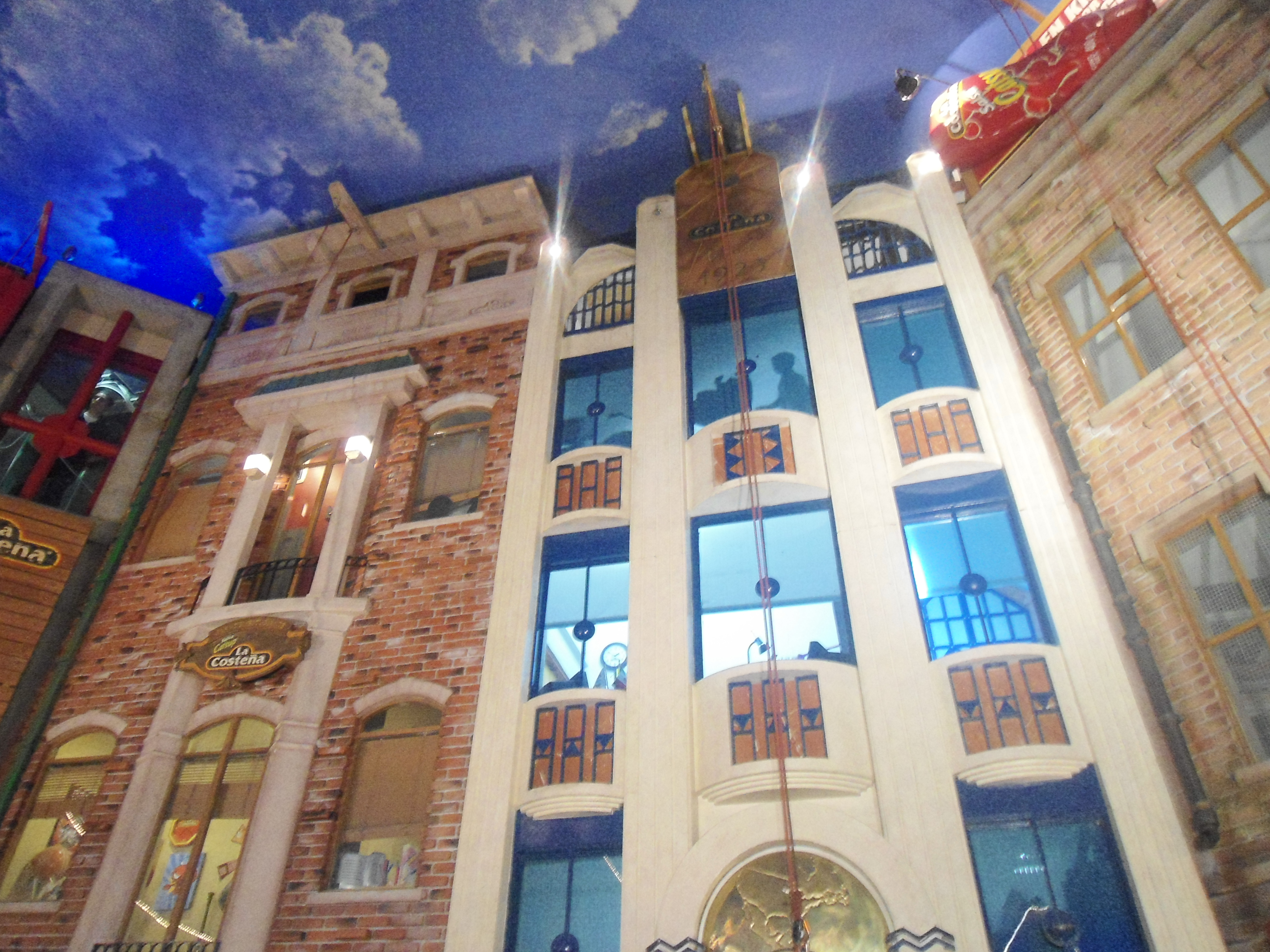
KidZania Mexico

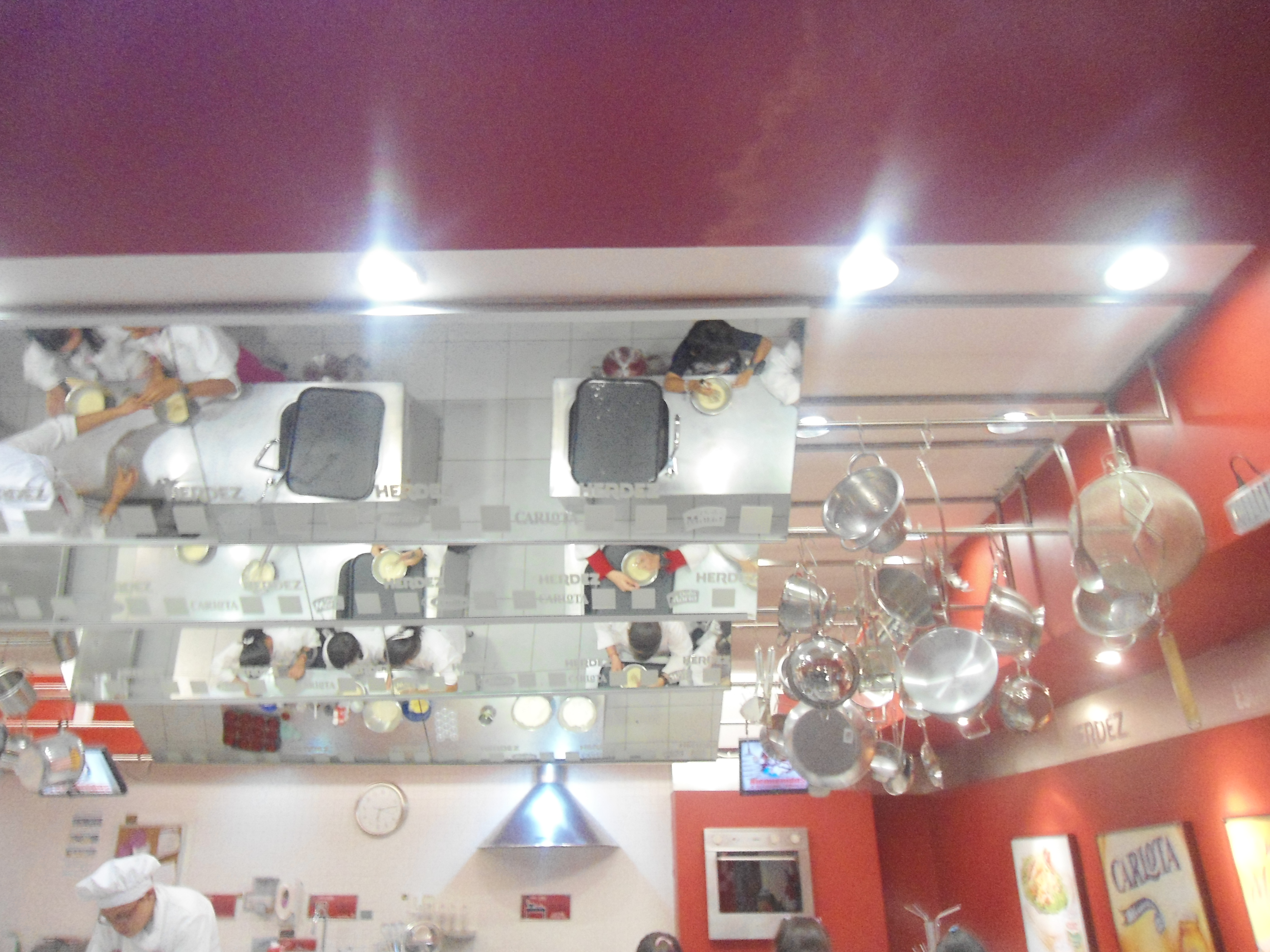
KidZania Mexico

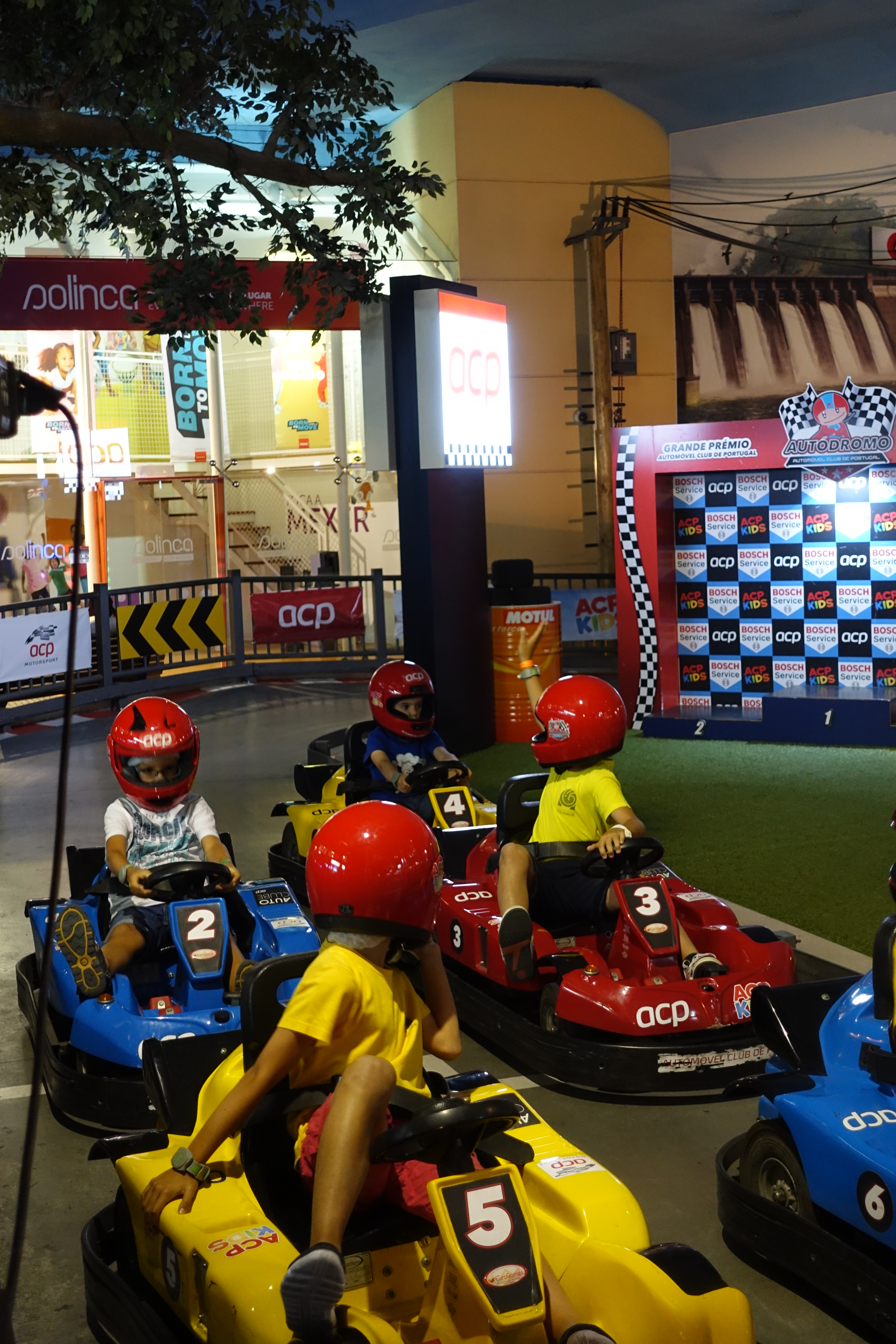
Kidzania Lisbon, August 2017

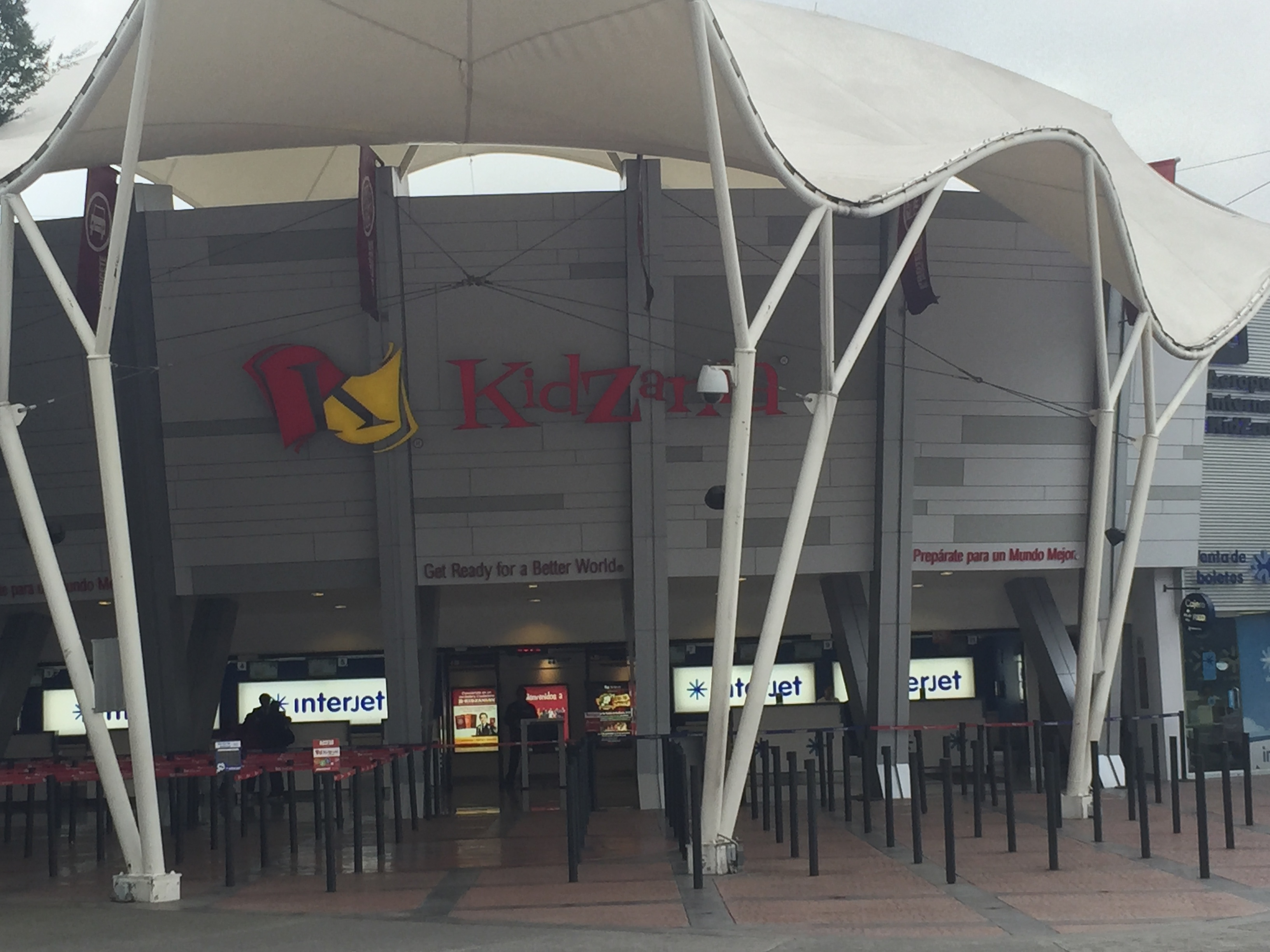
Kidzania Plaza, Cuicuilco, Mexico

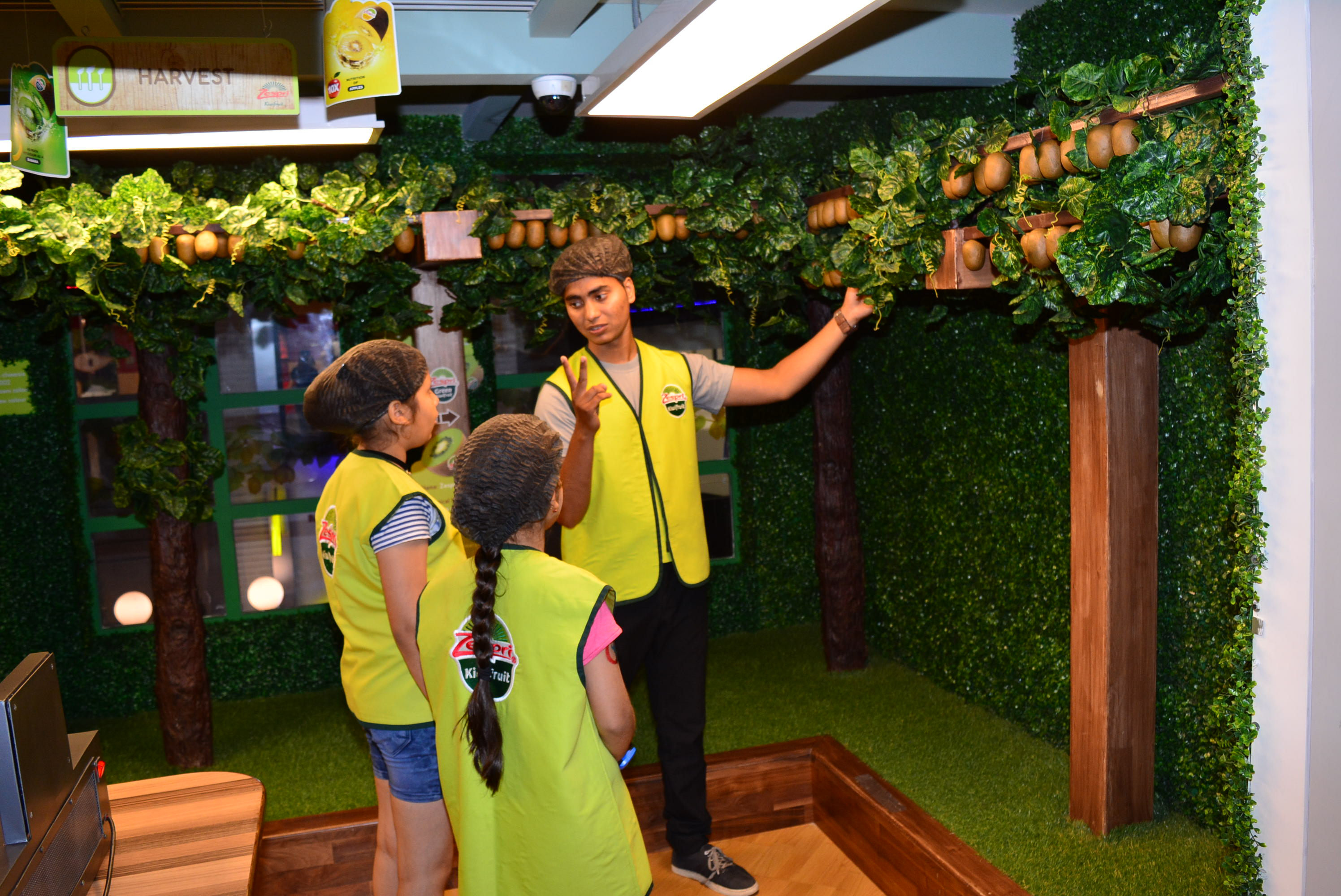
KidZania Fruit Orchard, KidZania Mumbai

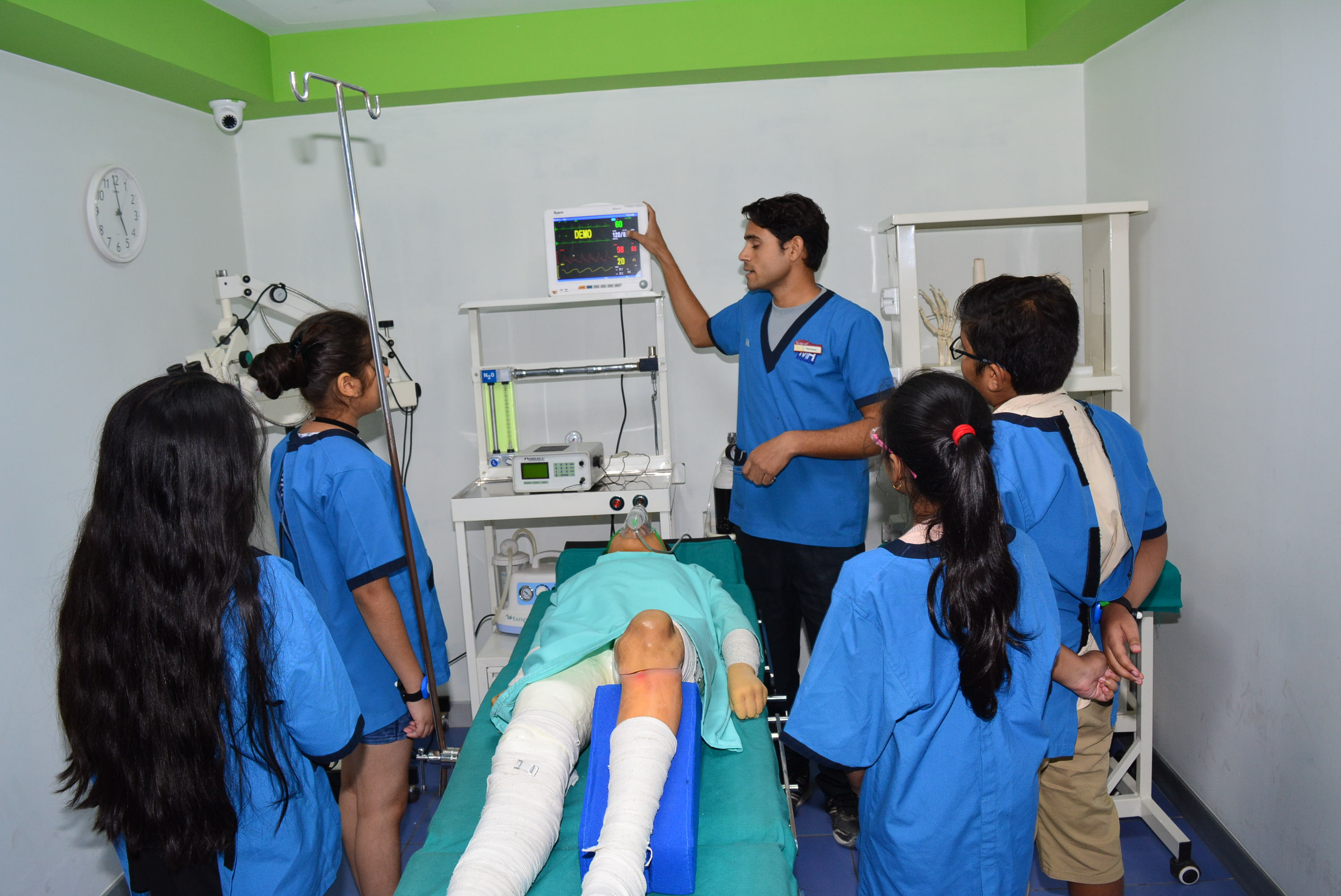
KidZania Hospital, KidZania Mumbai

== See also ==
- Wannado City
- Children's museum
- Safety Town
