= National Real Estate Development Council =

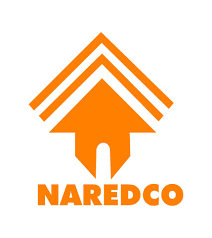
- Abbreviation: NAREDCO
- Formation: 1998
- Type: Real Estate Organization
- Headquarters: New Delhi
- Region served: India
- Key people: Rajeev Talwar (Chairman) Niranjan Hiranandani (Vice Chairman) Rajan Bandelkar (President)
- Parent organization: Ministry of Housing and Urban Affairs
- Website: naredco.in

The National Real Estate Development Council (NAREDCO) was established self-regulatory body in 1998 under the aegis of Housing And Urban Affairs Government of India.
