= Ghatkopar =

- Suburb
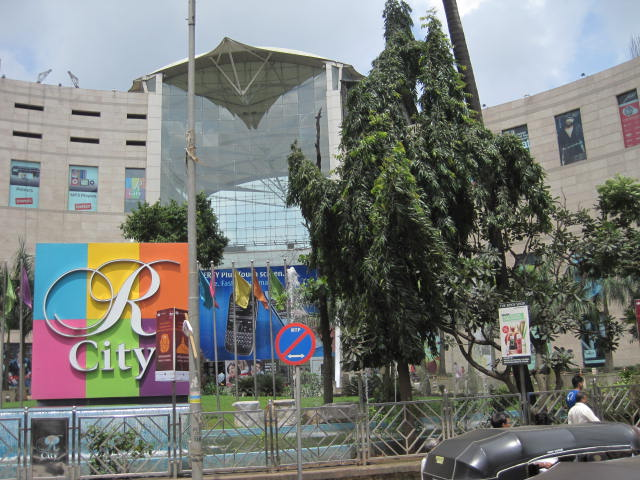
- R City Mall, Ghatkopar

- Location within Mumbai
- Coordinates: 19.08°N 72.91°E
- Country: India
- State: Maharashtra
- District: Mumbai Suburban
- City: Mumbai
- Suburbs: Eastern Suburbs
- Ward: N

Government
  - Type: Municipal Corporation
  - Body: Brihanmumbai Municipal Corporation (MCGM)
  - M.L.A: Ram Kadam; BJP (Ghatkopar West) (since 2014)
  - M.L.A: Parag Shah; BJP (Ghatkopar East) (since 2019)
  - M.P.: Sanjay Dina Patil; NCP (since 2024)

Population (2017 est.)
  - Total: 620,000

Languages
  - Official: Marathi
- Time zone: UTC+5:30 (IST)
- Area code: 022
- Vehicle registration: MH-03

Ghatkopar (Pronunciation: [ɡʱaːʈkopəɾ]) is a suburb in eastern Mumbai, close to which the city's international airport is located. The area is located on the western corner of the Western Ghats and marks the beginning of the Ghats from Mumbai side. It is served by the railway station on the Central Line of the Mumbai Suburban Railway and the metro station on Line 1 of the Mumbai Ghatkopar has a large Marathi and Gujarati population.

== History ==
Ghatkopar in the 1920s was a village ringed by creeks and salt pans. It was administered by a municipal council led by a Collector of the Suburban District. It became part of Greater Bombay in 1945.

There are many interpretations to how Ghatkopar got its name. Some say it refers to the hill range tapering off at Thane, "Ghat ke upar", which roughly means "on top of hill". Others believe the name is derived from the Marathi word for "corner" of the Western Ghats- "Kopara", therefore, Ghat-kopara.

The names given to roads in Ghatkopar offer an interesting peek into its recent history. It has roads like Nowrojee Lane for Nowrojee Sheth, Cama Lane after Lady Cama, Hingwala Lane after a family dealing with asafoetida. Khetani chowk named after Durlabhji Keshavji Khetani a renowned industrialist and philanthropist whose descendants still live in Ghatkopar.

== Mumbai Metro Project ==
The Versova-Andheri-Ghatkopar Metro corridor of the Mumbai Metro project is an 11.07 km long double line corridor on an elevated viaduct. The route uses Standard Gauge air-conditioned trains with 12 elevated stations. It has a carrying capacity of 60,000 persons per hour and the commuting time on the entire stretch is 21 minutes. The commute time between Versova and Ghatkopar was reduced by 70 minutes by this line. Metro started running successfully from July 2014.

== Notable people ==
- Parmeshwari Devi Gordhandas Garodia – Indian educationist and founder of P. G. Garodia School. In 1969, she established an English-medium school with seven students in a garage in Ghatkopar, which subsequently developed into the Garodia group of educational institutions.
- Shyam Pathak – Indian television actor best known for portraying Popatlal in Taarak Mehta Ka Ooltah Chashmah. He was born and raised in Ghatkopar.
- Navneet Kaur Rana – Indian actress and former Member of Parliament for Amravati. She grew up in Ghatkopar and Andheri.
- Dr. Usha Iyer – Indian economist, academician and author of economics textbooks. She taught economics at K. J. Somaiya College of Science and Commerce in the Ghatkopar–Vidyavihar area and later served as principal of S.I.W.S. College, Wadala. Her publications include textbooks in business economics, microeconomics and macroeconomics, as well as Health Services to Women: An Economic Perspective (2012). In 2021, she received the ASIA–GCC Dynamic Principal Award for Excellence & Leadership in Education.
- Karamshi Jethabhai Somaiya (1902–1999) – Indian industrialist, philanthropist and educationist. Founder of Somaiya Vidyavihar, established in 1959 on land purchased in Ghatkopar. His educational initiatives contributed to the development of the Ghatkopar–Vidyavihar area as a centre for higher education. He was posthumously awarded the Padma Bhushan in 2000.
- Yashraj Mehra – Indian rapper, songwriter and composer who has lived in Ghatkopar.
- Kishore Nandlaskar – Indian film and theatre actor who spent part of his childhood in Ghatkopar.
- Ram Kadam (born 1972) – Indian politician belonging to the Bharatiya Janata Party (BJP). He has represented the Ghatkopar West Assembly constituency in the Maharashtra Legislative Assembly since 2009. Initially elected as a member of the Maharashtra Navnirman Sena (MNS), he joined the BJP in 2014 and was subsequently re-elected in 2014, 2019 and 2024.
- Atul Dodiya (born 1959) – Indian contemporary painter and artist, born and raised in Ghatkopar. He has continued to live and maintain his art studio in the suburb while exhibiting internationally.
- Dr. Datta Samant (1932–1997) – Indian physician, politician and trade union leader who led the 1982–83 Great Bombay Textile Strike. He practised medicine in Ghatkopar and maintained his trade union office in Pant Nagar, which became an important meeting place for industrial workers and union representatives.
- Dr. Bhaskar Prataprai Shah – Indian interventional cardiologist and founder of Ashirwad Heart Hospital in Ghatkopar East. He was also a founding member and former director of the Asian Heart Institute in Mumbai.
- Prakash Mehta – Indian politician belonging to the Bharatiya Janata Party (BJP). He represented Ghatkopar in the Maharashtra Legislative Assembly for six terms and served as Maharashtra's Minister of Housing.
- Parag Shah – Indian politician and businessman belonging to the BJP. He has represented Ghatkopar East in the Maharashtra Legislative Assembly since 2019 and was re-elected in 2024.

== Education ==
- St. Paul's College, Mumbai
- SIES Dr. APJ Abdul Kalam Memorial High School
- P. G. Garodia School
- Ramniranjan Jhunjhunwala College
- K. J. Somaiya College of Engineering
- K.V.K Ghatkopar Sarvajanik School
- Dominic Savio Vidyalaya
- Shivaji Shikshan Sanstha
- The Sarvodaya Anantya School
- Shri Indradeo Singh International School
- Hindi High School
- Sai Nath Nagar B.M.C School
- PVG Vidya Bhawan School
- Dhanji Devashi Mahanagara Palika High School Marathi School
- Sheth Dhanji Devshi Rashtriya Shala (Gujarati Medium)
- Sheth Virchand Dhanji Secondary English Medium School
- Garodia International Centre for Learning
- The Universal School, Ghatkopar
- Ramji Assar Vidyalaya
- Ramji Vidyalaya Group Of Schools & Laxmichand Golwala College Of Commerce & Economics
- Pune Vidyarthi Griha's College of Science and Technology
- Gurukul College of Commerce
- Vidya Niketan Degree College of Commerce, Ghatkopar (E)
- Vidya Niketan College Of Science and Commerce, Ghatkopar (W)
- SMT. P.N. DOSHI Women’s College

== Food culture ==
Ghatkopar is known for its vegetarian street-food culture, particularly the food stalls of Khau Galli on Vallabh Baug Lane in Ghatkopar East. The area is associated with Gujarati snacks, dosas, sandwiches, chaat and desserts, including fusion preparations combining traditional Indian street food with cheese, pasta and other ingredients.

Eateries featured in published food guides include:

- Achija – A vegetarian restaurant known for pav bhaji and masala pav.
- Sai Swad Dosa – A street-food stall offering varieties of dosa, including the Jini dosa.
- Jayshree Sandwich – A long-established sandwich stall known for vegetable and cheese sandwiches.
- WTC Pasta – A street-food outlet serving pasta and other fusion dishes.
- Pooja Malai Gola – A dessert stall serving malai gola and shaved-ice preparations.

== Religious sites ==
Ghatkopar is home to several Jain temples (derasars) and Hindu places of worship.

=== Jain temples ===
The Jain community maintains several temples and religious institutions in Ghatkopar. The Shri Jiravalla Parshvanath Jain Derasar, situated on Derasar Lane in Ghatkopar East, is documented as a Grade III heritage site by the Mumbai Heritage Project. The temple is associated with the Cutchi Jain community and hosts religious observances, including Chaturmas and Ayambil Oli.

Other Jain places of worship include Shri Munisuvrat Swami Jain Derasar on Navroji Lane in Ghatkopar West, Nageshwar Parshvanath Jain Temple on Garden Lane, and Godiji Parshvanath Jain Temple in Pant Nagar, Ghatkopar East.

=== Shri Ram Mandir and Bhajan Samaj ===
The Bhajan Samaj Temple Complex, also known as Shri Ram Mandir, is located on 90 Feet Road in Garodia Nagar, Ghatkopar East. The Bhajan Samaj originated as a devotional singing group in the mid-1960s under the leadership of R. V. Sridhar. A site donated by the Garodia family was subsequently developed into a temple complex.

The complex contains shrines dedicated to Rama, Ganesha, Shiva, Hanuman, Guruvayurappan, Rajarajeshwari and other Hindu deities. The organisation also conducts religious and cultural programmes, including Ram Navami observances and Vedic chanting.

=== BAPS Swaminarayan Mandir ===
The Bochasanwasi Akshar Purushottam Swaminarayan Sanstha (BAPS) maintains the BAPS Shri Swaminarayan Mandir at Sarita Park, 80 Feet Road, Garodia Nagar, Ghatkopar. The temple is associated with the Swaminarayan tradition of Hinduism.

== See also ==
- 2000 Mumbai landslide
- Ghatkopar metro station
- Ghatkopar railway station
