= Somaiya =

Somaiya may refer to:

- Somaiya Vidyavihar
- K. J. Somaiya College of Engineering
- K. J. Somaiya Institute of Engineering and Information Technology
- Karamshi Jethabhai Somaiya
