= SIES Graduate School of Technology =

Engineering college in Mumbai, India

SIES Graduate School of Technology(Autonomous), NAAC A+, NBA Accredited (EXTC, CE & IT)
- Motto: RISE WITH EDUCATION
- Type: Engineering and Technological Institute
- Established: 2002
- Accreditation: NAAC Grade:A+
- Affiliations: University of Mumbai
- President: Dr.V. Shankar
- Principal: Dr. K.Lakshmisudha
- Academic staff: 150
- Undergraduates: 2340
- Postgraduates: 72
- Location: Nerul, Navi Mumbai, Maharashtra, India; 19.042827°N 73.023288°E
- Campus: Urban, Spread over 6.5 acres in Navi Mumbai.
- Website: http://www.siesgst.edu.in

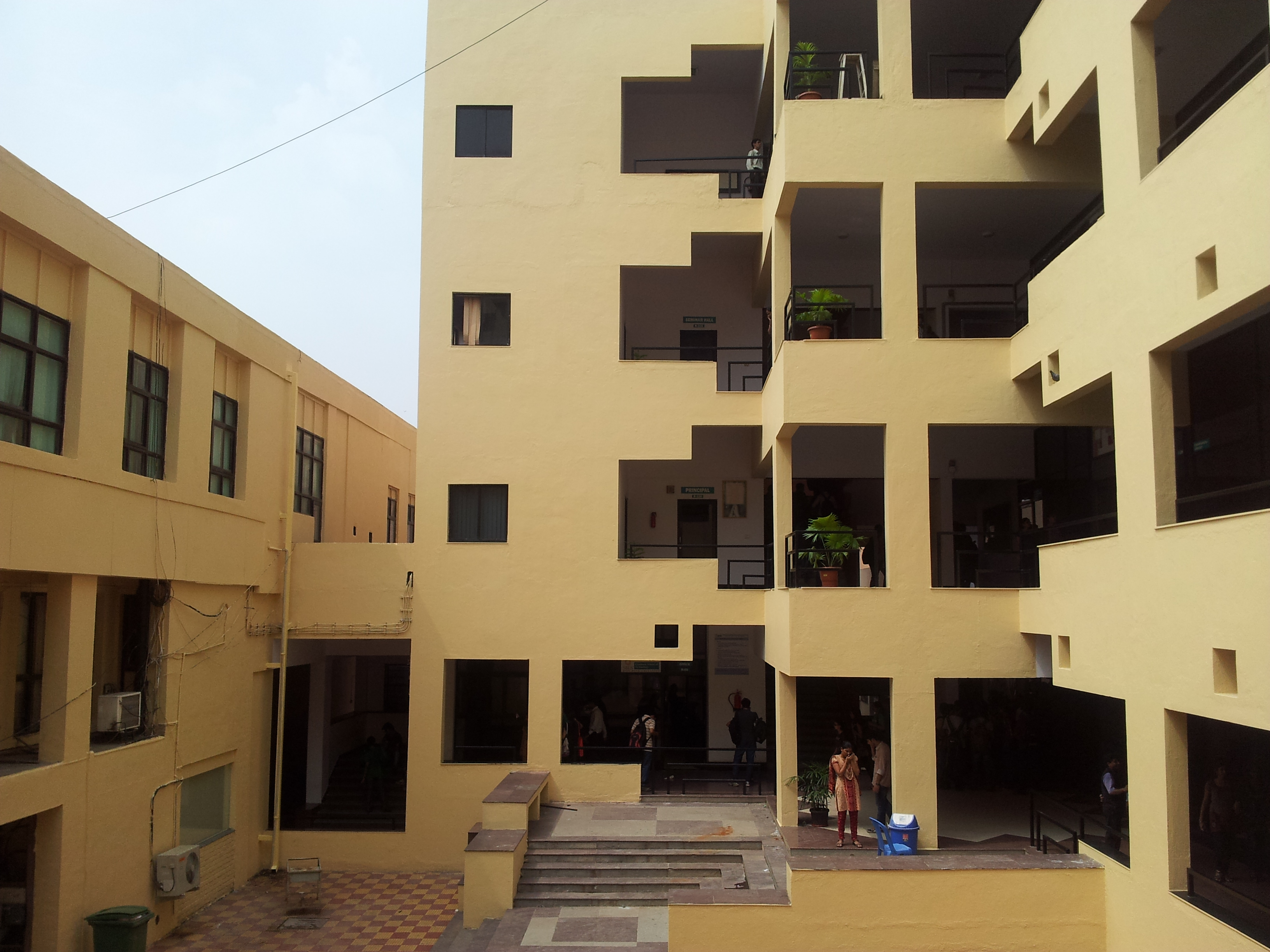
SIES GST Main Bldg & Quadrangle

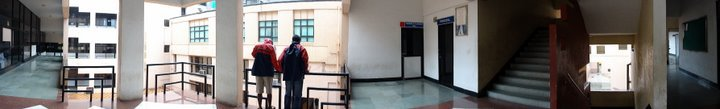
1st Floor

SIES Graduate School of Technology (SIES GST) is an engineering college, an integral part of SIES, and was started in the year 2002. It is one of the Institutes in Navi Mumbai imparting Engineering Technical Education. The institute is approved by the AICTE New Delhi, DTE Mumbai and affiliated to the University of Mumbai. SIES GST is one of the premier engineering institutes in Mumbai area under the ambit of University of Mumbai.

== Campus ==
SIES GST is located in the campus called Sri Chandrasekarendra Saraswati Vidyapuram. The college shares its campus with institutions of the SIES group. Campus is spread across 6.5 acres of land in Navi Mumbai and is located at one of the premier suburbs of Nerul. A Language Laboratory with audio-visual equipment aids in modern structured teaching. SIES Graduate School of Technology, an integral part of this well-established Community, started in the year 2002 is located in the list of an educational hub in Navi Mumbai imparting quality based technical education, offering four year B. Tech courses in Electronics and Telecommunication Engineering, Computer Engineering, Information Technology, Electronics & Computer Science, Artificial Intelligence & Machine Learning, Artificial Intelligence & Data Science, Computer Science And Engineering (Internet Of Things And Cyber Security Including Block Chain Technology), Two Post Graduation Courses M. Tech in Artificial Intelligence & Data Science, Information Security and Three Working Professional Courses B. Tech in Artificial Intelligence and Data Science, Computer Engineering and Information Technology. SIES GST is equipped with 52 laboratories, Workshops, Computer Center, Language Lab and dedicated Project Labs. The institute has two auditoriums. With a combined capacity of over 200 students, these auditoriums are used for the various activities conducted by the students ranging from workshops to seminars as well as the college placement activities. The college also has a Seminar Hall used for project presentations, Management discussions and faculty meetings. The facility of Gymnasium with fitness equipment and the services of professional trainers is available for the students.

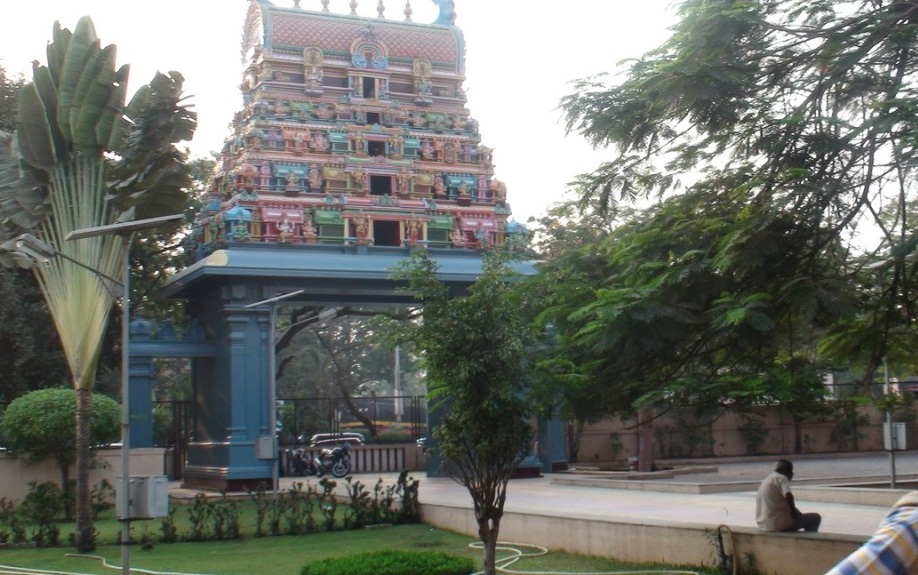
SIES campus

=== Official address ===
SIES Graduate School of Technology,

Sri Chandrasekarendra Saraswati Vidyapuram,

Sector-V, Nerul,

Navi Mumbai - 400706.

=== Public transport ===
The campus is located in Nerul East, off the Sion Panvel Expressway. The institute is accessible by Harbour line (CST-Panvel & Andheri-Panvel) & trans-harbour line (Thane-Nerul-Panvel) local trains, State Transport buses, BEST and NMMT buses.

== Campus life ==
Students come out with their creative talents and both students and staff let their hair down through the various extracurricular activities planned round the year. The idea is to provide students opportunities to showcase their talents in many diversified fields of activities such as, music and dance, debates and discussions, creative arts and many more. Days of national and cultural importance are celebrated in the GST showcasing the concept behind celebration of these days. Apart from sharing their ideas and displaying their innovative skills the students learn through the seminars and lectures by the experts in their respective field. Organized during the month of February - March, every year, Tatva-Moksha-Lakshya', is the most sought after activity for and by the students of the SIES Graduate School of Technology. 'Tatva-Moksha-Lakshya', as the name suggests is a mix of technical, cultural and sports events and spans over a period of three days. Among the Technical events, students' body for IEEE, CSI and IETE organize seminars and training programs in the form of 'Cognition', during the odd semester and 'Tatva', along with the cultural festival, in the even semester. 'Moksha' and 'Lakshya' are the intercollegiate cultural and sports events. The annual three pronged festival provides respite to the students from their hectic academic schedule where they immerse themselves completely in the fun and enjoy each and every moment. Apart from pure fun, the festival inculcates the spirit of teamwork along with various interpersonal skills, needed in their profession.

== Associations ==
There are associations like the following:

- CODECHEF-SIESGST (SIESGSTARENA) (Student Chapter by students of all the departments under CodeChef)

CodeChef is a platform to help programmers make it big in the world of algorithms, computer programming and programming contests. CodeChef Campus Chapters aim at promoting competitive programming in various colleges and schools around the world and help students become better problem solvers which goes a long way in learning as well as in their career development.

- CSI-SIESGST(Formed by the computer and IT students)

The CSI SIES-GST Student Chapter was inaugurated in 2009. Dr. Namrata Patel (Comps. Dept.) is the Convenor of the same. It is the largest student body in SIES amongst all. It has conducted workshops on areas like Basic computing, Ethical hacking and Information Security.

- NSS-SIESGST(Formed by the student association for service of the nation )

At the GST social commitments are taken very seriously and students are made aware of their social responsibility. The institute has a formally established NSS unit and the NSS volunteers selflessly work for the underprivileged; teaching and conducting awareness programs in schools and organizing blood donation camp, health/hygiene awareness seminars, caring for the aged and more. Environmental issues are taken up through initiatives such as tree plantations, waste disposal management, and others. Organize a 7 days residential camp at a rural places of Maharashtra and help villages with variety of Shram Dan done by the NSS volunteers.

- IETE-SIESGST (Association by the computer and IT students )

IETE (Institute of Electronics & Telecommunications Engineers) is the most recent student body formed in SIES-GST. It plays an active role in organizing extra-curricular events in the college.Prof. Mrinal Khadse (IT. Dept.) is the Convenor of the same.

- IEEE-SIESGST (Students of extc and robotics interested students' association )

IEEE is the oldest student body of SIES-GST with students from all the branches being members of it. It is an active body in organising all extra-curricular activities in the college.Prof. Biju Balakrishnan (EXTC. Dept.) is the Convenor of the same.

- IPI-SIESGST (Student Chapter by students of Printing & Packaging Technology under Indian Plastics Institute, Mumbai )

IPI (Indian Plastics Institute) students chapter helps students gain advanced knowledge and current information about technology & applications of Plastics, to learn about contemporary Industrial practices and potential future developments in Plastics through IPI Educational Activities.

== Festivals ==
=== Tatva Moksh Lakshya ===
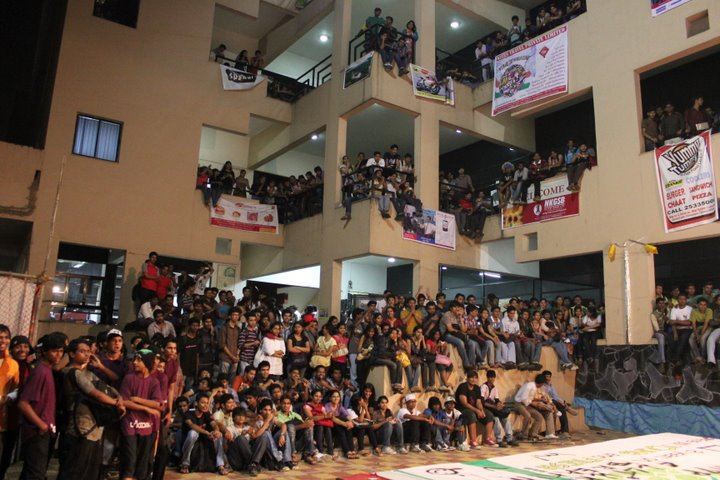
Crowd during Street Dancing of Tatva Moksh'10

The Annual Inter-College Technical and Cultural Festival of SIES GST is Tatva Moksh. The college festival's roots were laid back in 2004 when it was known by the name Sigma, Tatva Moksh has come of age. Today it is clubbed with the sports fest called Lakshya to be known as Tatva Moksh Lakshya or TML. Tatva for TechFest & Moksh for Cultural Fest, while Lakshya is the Sports fest. It is organized by the Student Council in the first half of every year. It is a culmination of Technical, Cultural and Sports events all in one. With participation from all over Mumbai & Navi Mumbai, it is one of the most awaited events of the year.

The Look of Tatva Moksh 2012

=== Distortion ===
Part of the Moksh Festival, Distortion is the Rock show held annually to mark the end of Moksh. Distortion 2011 was headlined by three bands- Zygnema, Coshish and Black. Distortion 2013 was headed by 'Narkasur', 'Krazy Electrons', 'Blakc' and 'Agnee'. It also organises an amateur rock band competition called AM-Rock. Distortion 2012 saw PARADIGM SHIFT & ARQUEBUS performing for the energetic crowds at SIES GST. TATVA-MOKSH 2014 Website:

=== Cognition ===
It is the Annual National Technical festival of SIES GST. The festival is a fusion of knowledge, experimentation and analysis. Every year Cognition raises its standards. It was a result of immense hard work and meticulous planning. The festival spread over three days, has events including Technical Paper Presentations, Reverse Engineering, Web Designing, Tech race, Tech Quiz, Tech Charades, Mock Crime Scene Investigation and Code Wars. It is an eagerly anticipated event in the institute.

=== Impressions ===
The Printing and Packaging Technology department organizes its own annual festival Impressions on the occasion of World Printers's Day.

=== Sports: Lakshya ===
Lakshya is the sports festival. Football, Cricket, Badminton & other events are organized under its banner.

The 2014 edition of Lakshya saw a Dream run-marathon in Nerul.

== Placements ==
SIES GST has one of the best established placement cells with national and multinational companies visiting the campus with consistent placement offers. Over the past several years, a strong placement network has been developed with industries in the manufacturing, engineering, financial services, information technology, publication and other sectors. This has been achieved through constant interaction with the industry by way of seminars, research projects, and on-and off-campus initiatives. As part of its placement efforts, placement teams visit potential employers and consultants and apprise them of the level of knowledge and practical application skills acquired by the graduates in their respective areas of specialization. The profiles of the students seeking placement assistance are made available to the prospective employers. Placement meets and personality development workshops are organized as part of the placement program. All the students are provided guidance in career planning as they progress to higher levels of the program. A number of national and multinational companies have recruited the students through campus recruitment.

- placements

== See also ==
- University of Mumbai
- SIES
- SIES College of Arts, Science, and Commerce
- SIES Nerul
- SIES College of Commerce and Economics
- SIES High School
- SIES College of Management Studies
