= V. N. Rajasekharan Pillai =

Indian chemist (born 1949)

Prof. V.N. Rajasekharan Pillai
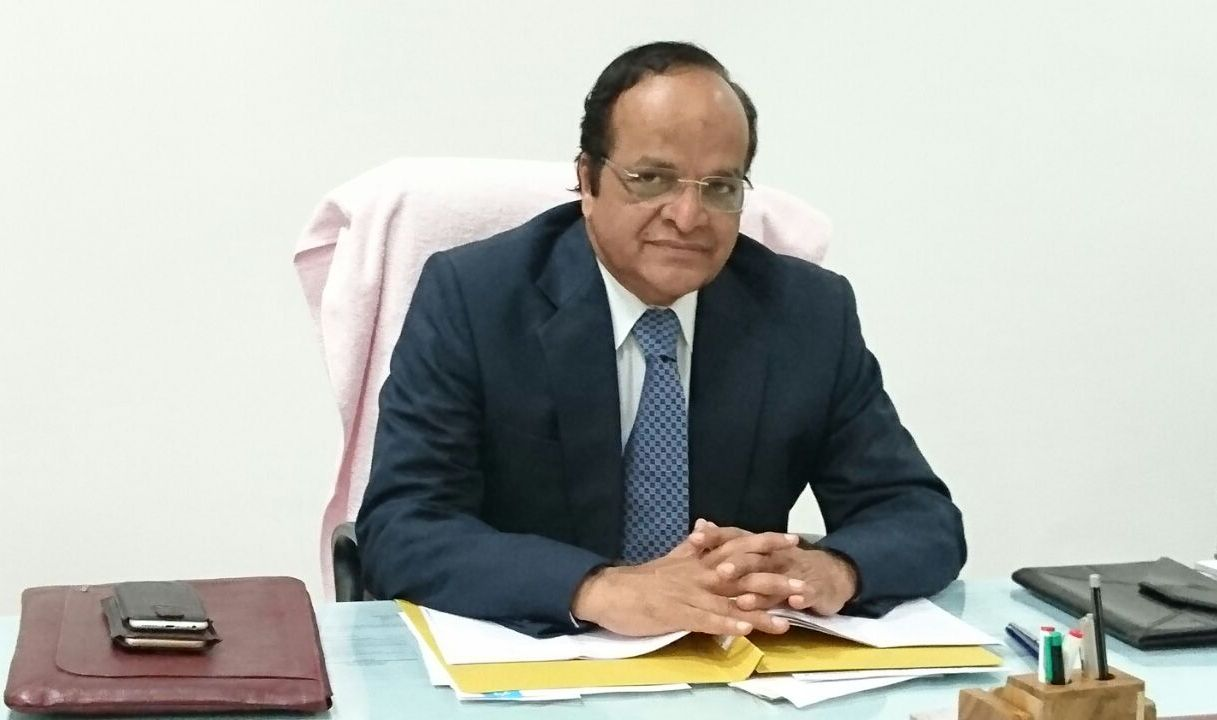

Vice-Chancellor of Somaiya Vidyavihar University and Provost, Somaiya Vidyavihar
- In office 20 October 2006 – 20 October 2011
- Preceded by: H.P. Dikshit

Chairman University Grants Commission
- In office 2005–2006
- Preceded by: Arun Nigvekar
- Succeeded by: S.K. Thorat

Vice Chairman University Grants Commission
- In office 2003–2005

Director of the National Assessment and Accreditation Council
- In office 19 April 2001 – 18 April 2003
- Preceded by: Hari Gautam
- Succeeded by: V.S. Prasad

Vice Chancellor of the Mahatma Gandhi University

Vice Chancellor of the Cochin University

Personal details
- Born: 20 October 1949 (age 76) Cengannur, Kerala State, India
- Spouse: Geetha Pillai
- Profession: Chemist
- Website: V N Rajasekharan Pillai

V. N. Rajasekharan Pillai (born 20 October 1949) is the vice-chancellor of Somaiya Vidyavihar University and provost of Somaiya Vidyavihar, Pillai concurrently serving as the chancellor of the ICFAI University, Tripura. He was president of Mewar University, Chiittorgarh, Rajasthan, India (2016–2018).

== Career ==
Pillai is the Founder President of Human Development Foundation India, a Civil Society Organisation in the National Capital Region, New Delhi.

He served as the executive vice-president of the Kerala State Council for Science, Technology and Environment, Govt of Kerala (2011–2014). Simultaneously, he held the positions of principal secretary, Science & Technology Dept. of the Govt. of Kerala, chairman of the Kerala Coastal Zone Management Authority, and the Kerala Biotechnology Commission.

Prior to that, he was the vice-chancellor of the Indira Gandhi National Open University (IGNOU), New Delhi (2006–2011). He served as vice-chairman and chairman of the University Grants Commission, Govt of India, New Delhi, during the period 2002–2006.

He was executive director of the National Assessment and Accreditation Council (NAAC), Govt of India, during the period 2000–2002.

Prior to that, Pillai was the vice-chancellor of the Mahatma Gandhi University, Kottayam, Govt of Kerala and held additional charge of the Cochin University of Science and Technology (1996–2000).

In 2000, he was on a visiting research professor assignment in the University of Lausanne, Switzerland.

From 1983 to 1996, Pillai worked in various academic and research executive positions in the Mahatma Gandhi University, Kottayam such as the founder professor and director of the School of Chemical Sciences, dean of Faculty of Science, founder director of the School of Professional Distance Education, director, College Development Council and controller of examinations of the university.

From 1977 to 1983, Pillai worked as a postdoctoral research fellow, on deputation from Calicut University, Kerala, in the Universities of Tubigen and Mainz, Germany.

From 1971 to 1983, he worked in the Universities of Kerala and Calicut University as UGC/CSIR Junior and senior research fellow, assistant professor and associate professor in the area of chemical sciences.

=== Fellowships ===
- Elected Fellow of the Indian Academy of Sciences.
- Distinguished Fellow of the Kerala Academy of Sciences
- Honorary Fellow of the Institution of Electronics and Telecommunication Engineers (IETE), New Delhi
- Fellow of the Royal Society of Chemistry
- Honorary Senior Fellow of the Jawaharlal Nehru Centre for Advanced Scientific Research, Banaglaore

== Role in higher education ==
A teacher and researcher in the field of Chemical Sciences, Pillai has held post-doctoral and visiting research professor positions in the University of Tübingen (Mainz, Germany and Lausanne, Switzerland).

He created a research group in the area of biopolymers and peptides, has published extensively in this area, and has supervised over 50 doctoral students. He holds an international patent for the gram-scale preparation of biologically important peptides.

== Academic and administrative positions ==
Pillai has served as chairman and vice-chairman of the University Grants Commission (UGC), director of the (NAAC), Bangalore, Vice-Chancellor of the Mahatma Gandhi University, Kottayam, Kerala, vice-chancellor of the Cochin University of Science and Technology, founder-director of the School of Chemical Sciences; dean of Faculty of Science; controller of examinations; director of College Development Council; founder-director of the School of Professional Distance Education and chief, Employment and Information Guidance Bureau of the Mahatma Gandhi University.

== See also ==
- Somaiya Vidyavihar
- K.J. Somaiya College of Engineering
