= South Indian Education Society High School =

S.I.E.S. High School

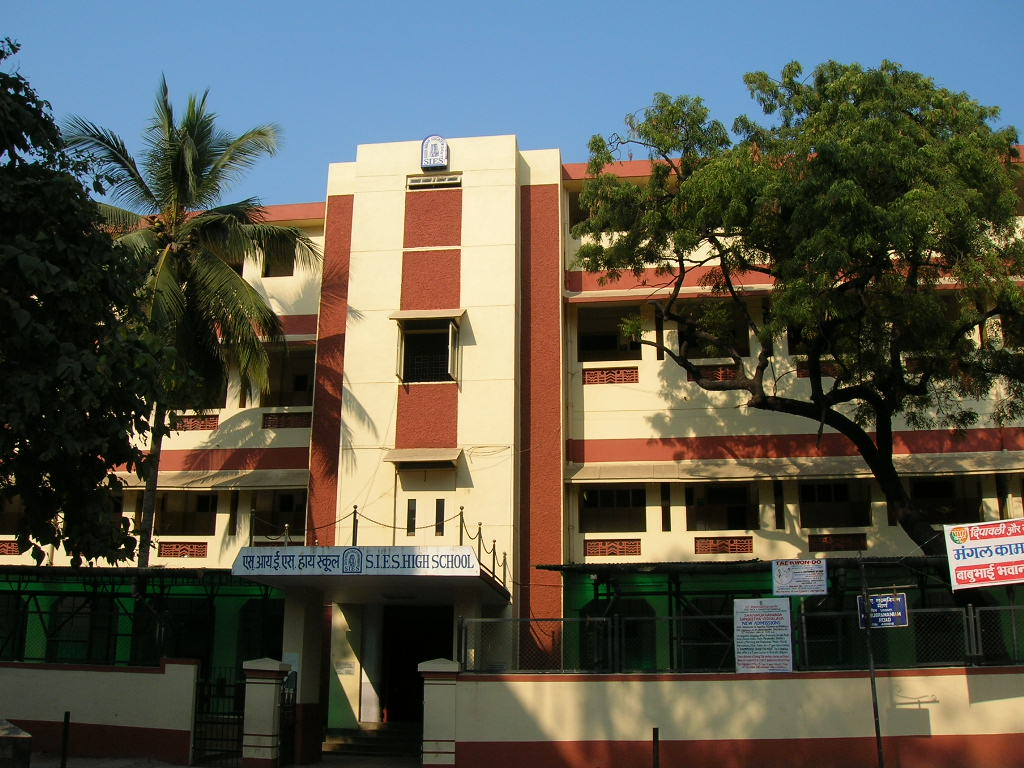
- SIES High School building

Location
- SIES Chowk, K.A Subramaniam Road; Matunga; Mumbai, Maharashtra; India
- 19.03265°N 72.856042°E

Information
- School type: Co-education Affiliated school
- Motto: Learn And Be Wise
- Opened: 1932
- Founder: South Indian Education Society
- Status: Open
- Sister school: SIES College of Arts, Science, and Commerce; SIES College of Commerce and Economics
- School board: Maharashtra State Board
- School district: Mumbai City district
- Session: Day
- Chairman: Mr. R. Rajagopal
- Principal: Mrs. kalyani
- Enrollment: 4400
- Classes offered: Nursery to class X
- Language: English

S.I.E.S. High School, Matunga (Mumbai) is one of Mumbai's oldest and premier educational institutions. It is a co-educational English medium school, affiliated to Maharashtra Secondary School Certificate (SSC) Board, reputed for its high academic service, discipline and efficient management. The school is recognized by the Municipal Corporation of Greater Mumbai for primary education and Government of Maharashtra (and follows the SSC syllabus). The institution caters to the educational needs of all students irrespective of caste, creed or religion right from the Pre-Primary level to the Secondary level.

== History ==
In a meeting of the South Indian Association on 27 December 1931, it was resolved to form a body called the South Indian Education Society to work for the cause of the education of children in Mumbai and its suburbs. The society was registered on 21 April 1932, and a Primary School was started with six students in a rented garage on 6 June 1932. The first principal of the school was P.V. Parameshwar Iyer. By the end of the first year the strength grew to 97 and the school moved to a larger premise. In the following years a plot of ground at the foot of the steps of King's Circle Station was acquired, and gradually the nucleus of the present large building of the High School was set up there and enlarged, and completed in March 1954, by which time it had 4200 students, and was one of the largest schools in the city.

It is a co-educational English medium school, reputed for its high academic service, discipline and efficient management. The school is recognized by the Municipal Corporation and Government of Maharashtra (and follows the SSC syllabus). The institution caters to the educational needs of all students irrespective of caste, creed or religion right from the Pre-Primary level to the Secondary level. The Pre-Primary section presently houses 500 students, has adopted the Shishu Pahel methodology, a child motivational programme to impart quality education. The Primary sections, which has a strength of 1339 students is governed by the rules and regulations of the BMC (Private Primary Schools). It strictly follows the Grant-in-Code Book which lays down the statutory requirements.

The school is affordable by the poorest students with minimal yearly fees, and free education for girls up to the fifth standard (grade). The school is located close to the King's Circle railway station and is thus accessible by walk to people living in Matunga, Wadala, Sion, Dadar and C.G.S. colony (Antop Hill).

== Extra-curricular activities ==
The Pre-Primary Section of the school, which follows the Shishu Pahel Methodology plans various programmes like festivals, competitions, field trips, thematic exhibitions and other activities to expose the tiny tots to our great unique Indian Culture. The School is proud to have reigning Champs at Zonal level and State levels who have won prizes every year in sports activities. School also celebrates days of national importance, with due reverence to kindle the fire of patriotism and to kindle the harmony and peace with great zeal and fervour.

The Cultural Department organises a week-long cultural festival "Prerna" which is a conglomeration of all cultural events that are usually spread throughout the year. The following competitions are planned for this occasion; Carnatic Music, Mehendi, Light Music, Rangoli, Group Dance, Monologues, Group Singing, Fancy Dance, Ad-mad, Dramatisation and Mimicry. The Science club organises various educative programmes with the objective of infusing scientific fervour and a spirit of inquiry in the minds of children, while Art circles gives an opportunity for our students to find expression to their talents in painting, drawing, music and dance. For those with a flair for drawing, the art teachers organise special classes and coach students to participate in the Elementary and Intermediate Grade Examination conducted by the Maharashtra Govt. Competitions like 'best out of waste', 'rakhi making', 'greeting cards', 'salad decoration', 'flower arrangement' and 'rangoli' are also organised.

== Mission and vision ==
SIES High School believes "education" to be helpful in the democratic reconstruction of the Indian society, and hence aims in training the students to be both, a good professional and a sober, rational and discriminating citizen. The management and the staff are determined to make every effort to deepen and broaden the concept of education by enlarging its scope, to include, along with formal instruction, many co-curricular activities and thus help to develop an integrated human personality of the students.

== Platinum Jubilee ==
On 24 February 2008, the year of the Platinum Jubilee of the school, the batch of students that joined the school in its Silver Jubilee year—1958—and passed out in 1969, held their "golden reunion"—the first reunion of its kind by any batch of the school.

The Platinum Jubilee celebrations were held at SIES Nerul on 15 August 2008. Dr. A. P. J. Abdul Kalam, then President of India, present as a guest, inaugurated SIES Education Assistance Trust (SEAT), set up to provide financial assistance to deserving needy students and also honored 75 alumni of SIES who had distinguished themselves. The list includes Dr. Krishnaswami Kasturirangan, former Chairman ISRO; P. S. Narayanaswamy D.G.P. Maharashtra (Retd.), Sridhar Ranganathan (Yahoo! and Shankar Mahadevan Academy), Ms. A. Ananthalakshmi, Shobha Iyer (Basketball—India) singers Hariharan, Shankar Mahadevan, Aruna Sairam, Bombay Sisters, Ganesh-Kumaresh, Shreya Ghoshal, Naresh Iyer.

== Notable alumni ==
- Harish Iyer

== See also ==
- List of schools in Mumbai
