= South Indian Education Society =

Educational Society in Mumbai

South Indian Society
- Motto: Rise With Education
- Type: Private
- Established: 1932
- Affiliations: University of Mumbai
- Students: 18000
- Location: Nerul, Navi Mumbai, Maharashtra, India; 19.042827°N 73.023288°E
- Campus: Urban
- Website: http://www.siesedu.net

South Indian Education Society (SIES), founded in 1932, is one of Mumbai's oldest and most esteemed educational institutions. SIES encompasses a high school, a diverse group of arts, science, and commerce colleges, as well as various academic and professional institutions of higher learning, serving over 18,000 students.

== History ==
SIES was established in Mumbai by M. V. Venkateshwaran, with six students, being one of the oldest educational societies in Mumbai. A new SIES Complex at Nerul in Navi Mumbai was inaugurated in 1996.

In 2010, the income tax department raided the premises of the South Indian Education Society and the residences of some of its office-bearers.

== Academic institutions ==
Academic institutes run by SIES include:

- SIES High School, Matunga
- SIES College of Arts, Science, and Commerce, Sion (West)
- SIES Institute of Comprehensive Education, Sion (West)
- The SIES Institute of Medical and Laboratory Technology, Sion (West)
- SIES College of Commerce and Economics, Sion (East)
- SIES College of Management Studies, Nerul
- SIES (NERUL) College of Arts, Science and Commerce (Autonomous)
- SIES Indian Institute of Environment Management, Nerul
- SIES Graduate School of Technology (GST)
- The SIES School of Packaging (Packaging Technology Centre), Nerul, Navi Mumbai
- SIES Centre for Excellence in Management Research & Development, Nerul

== Social institutions ==
Social institutions run by SIES include:

- SIES Senior's Home, Nerul
- Sri Chandrasekarendra Saraswati Granthalaya, Nerul, Navi Mumbai
- Sri Chandrasekarendra Saraswati Veda Vidya Pitha, Navi Mumbai

== See also ==
- University of Mumbai
- SIES Nerul
