= SIES College of Arts, Science & Commerce =

College in Sion, Mumbai, India

- Motto: Rise With Education
- Type: Co-education
- Established: 20 June 1960
- Affiliations: University of Mumbai; Maharashtra State Board of Secondary and Higher Secondary Education
- Principal: Dr. Uma Shankar
- Academic staff: 68
- Administrative staff: 153
- Students: 4000+
- Location: Mumbai, Maharashtra, India; 19.0412525°N 72.8612799°E
- Nickname: Old SIES
- Website: siesascs.edu.in

SIES College of Arts, Science, and Commerce is a Mumbai-based college located in Sion. Established by the South Indian Education Society, the college schools students from class 11 and 12 right up to advanced degrees and has research facilities and is affiliated to the University of Mumbai. SIES has been ranked as the 7th best institute in India & 3rd in Mumbai for its Mass Communication Courses by The India Today.In the recent times college is being building recognized by various bodies as it Won the 2014-15 IMC NATIONAL QUALITY AWARD (Education Category) and Higher Education Forum Awarded "Innovation Award" in Graduate Humanities category on 14 March 2015. Its being reaccredited with 'A' by National Assessment and Accreditation Council with a CGPA score of 3.51 in third cycle of 2015.

== History ==
SIES College of Arts, Science and Commerce is a college in Sion, Mumbai, India, owned and managed by the South Indian Education Society (SIES). Inaugurated on 20 June 1960 by Shri Y. B. Chavan, the first Chief Minister of Maharashtra, with a Satyanarayan Puja, followed by felicitation of Teaching Staff, Non-Teaching Staff, and Students present during the year 1960–61, and completed its golden jubilee on 20 June 2009. The commerce stream at the degree level was started in 1980–81. Affiliated to the University of Mumbai, the college has an impressive strength of over 4,000 students, drawn from all sections of this cosmopolitan city. It received an "A" grade from NAAC in 2015 with a score of 3.51/4.00. College celebrated its golden jubilee on 20 June 2009. The college was awarded autonomous status by the University Grants Commission on 1 June 2018, and on 30 June 2018 by the University of Mumbai

== Grades and recognition ==
- IMC Bajaj National Quality Award (Education category) 2015
- An Award for "Innovation Initiatives" by Higher Education Forum In Graduate Humanities Category.
- Best College Award 2010–11, by University of Mumbai.
- College received an "A" grade from NAAC in 2015 with a CGPA of 3.51/4.00.,.
- Trophy-Best College Magazine
- Best College (Clean And Green Environment)
- BEQET president Award

[

== Extra-curricular activities ==
=== College festival ===
"Visions", an inter-collegiate cultural festival of SIES.

== Zero Carbon Footprint ==
The college in collaboration with Stree Mukti Sanghatana has started a Green initiative to Reduce-Reuse-Recycle with Responsibility. The college has taken up an Organic Manure production program wherein the food waste from canteen and horticulture waste from the college surrounding has now been converted to Organic manure. The program has been initiated from 15 August 2014, and by now the college has converted approximately 2 ½ tons of biodegradable waste, and has reaped around 200 kg of wet organic manure. The dry weight accounting up to 120 kg organic manure amounting to Rs. 2500/-.Through this initiative the college has saved this huge quantity of waste from going to the dumping ground, hence it has saved Natural resources. The same project has been replicated at Kawthewadi, the adopted village at Karjat, Maharashtra. The college has also initiated e-waste collection and recycling in collaboration with Stree Mukti Sanghatana. This e-waste is one of the most toxic and hazardous waste, also responsible for fires at dumping grounds, releasing toxic gases. With the help of NSS program, the students of the college have till date collected approximately 100 kg of e-waste. Through this initiative, the college has reached masses and saved toxic and hazardous waste reaching dumping grounds. By saving this e-waste going to dumping ground, it has also reduced water and air pollution, as the e-waste leaches in water and generates toxic waste. These are some of the innovative and eco-friendly initiatives that the college has started, and look forward for plenty more in the effort to reduce the carbon footprint of the college.

== Library ==
The Library has seen advances and is being utilised by students pretty well with a wide variety of collection. In order to know the status of book availability, the library is built with an OPAC system using open source software Koha to see visit the online library http://libcatsiesw-koha.informaticsglobal.com/cgi-bin/koha/opac-user.pl

=== Publications ===
SIES has an official college magazine titled "Dakshinayanam" which was also awarded the Best College Magazine by MU. It also has a BMM department's bi-monthly newsletter named "Skyline". The origin of departmental newsletters was started by the Zoology department under the guidance of Mr. Madhavan Gopalan

== Institutes ==
The college has "SIES Institute for Comprehensive Education" in its campus. Other sister institutes under the SIES management are;

- SIES College of Commerce and Economics
- SIES Graduate School of Technology
- SIES College of Management Studies
- SIES Nerul

== Notable alumni ==
- Aruna Sairam
- Ganesh and Kumaresh
- Hariharan
- Naresh Iyer
- Shankar Mahadevan
- Shreya Ghoshal
- Erica Fernandes
- Varsha Gaikwad
- Sudha Menon
- Aditya Narayan
- Major Ramaswamy Parameshwaran - PVC
- Raj Subramaniam - CEO, FedEx
