= Somaiya Vidyavihar =

Indian educational trust

- Formation: 1942; 84 years ago
- Founder: Karamshi Jethabhai Somaiya
- Type: Educational trust
- Headquarters: Mumbai, Maharashtra, India
- Location: Mumbai, India
- Region served: India
- Fields: Education
- President: Samir Somaiya
- Website: Official website

Somaiya Vidyavihar is an Indian educational trust that operates a network of schools, colleges, and institutions across Maharashtra, Karnataka, Gujarat, and Madhya Pradesh. It was founded by industrialist, educationist, and philanthropist Karamshi Jethabhai Somaiya, a Padma Bhushan recipient, in 1942.

== History ==
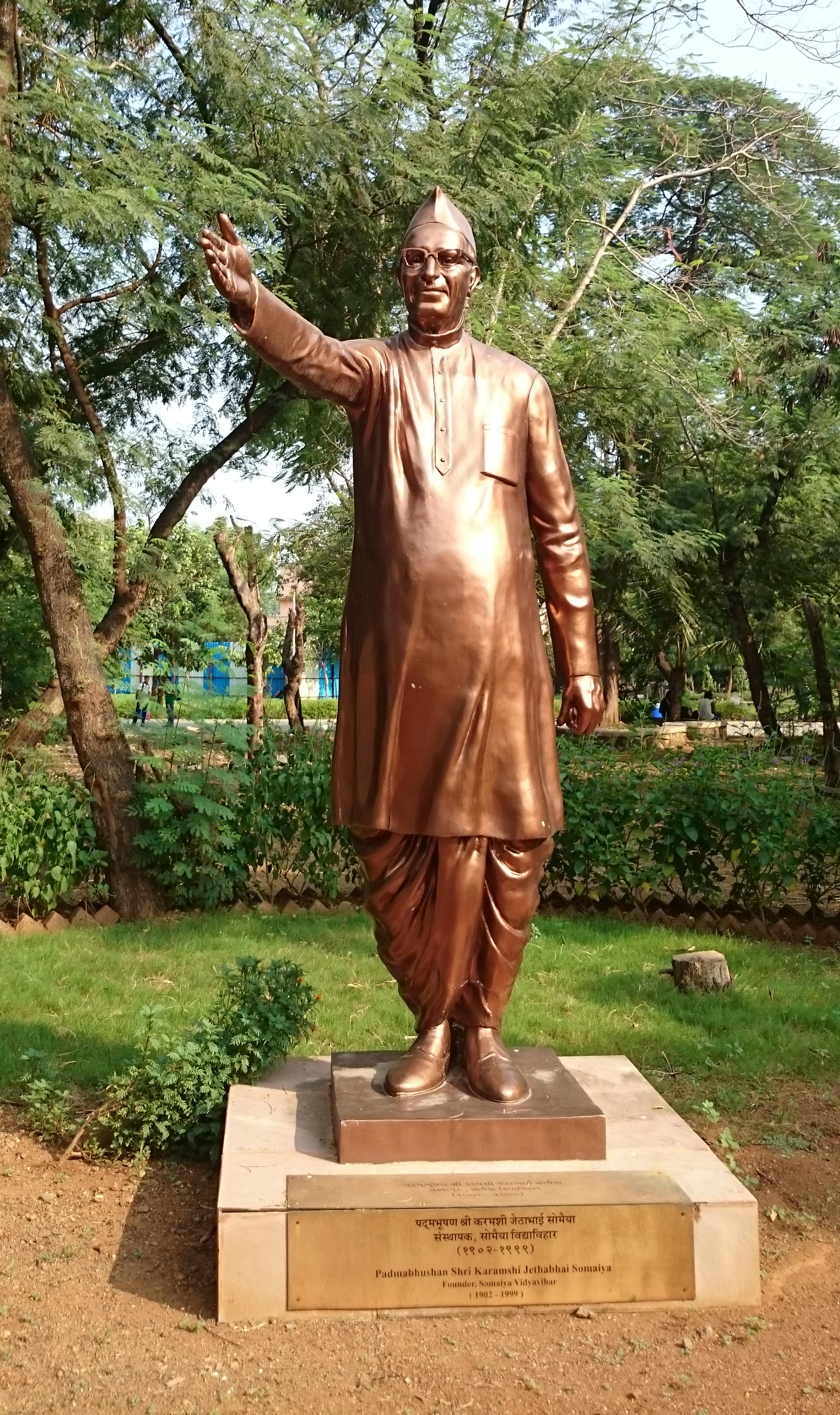
The statue of founder Karamshi Jethabhai Somaiya at the Somaiya Vidyavihar campus

Somaiya Vidyavihar was established by Karamshi Jethabhai Somaiya in 1942, starting with a primary school in Kopargaon, Maharashtra. It was formally registered as an education trust on 7 September 1959. After founding sugar factories in Sakharwadi and Laxmiwadi, Maharashtra, Karamshi Somaiya established the Somaiya Vidyamandir Schools in those locations and the K. J. Somaiya College of Arts and Sciences in 1959 in Mumbai.

The foundation stone for the Arts and Science College building at Vidyavihar was laid by the Chief Minister of Maharashtra, Yashwantrao Chavan, on 18 March 1960, and Amrutlal Yagnik, a noted scholar, assumed the role of the first principal of KJ Somaiya College of Arts & Science.

The K. J. Somaiya Yoga Academy was established and inaugurated by Swami Tadrupanand in April 1993, followed by the K. J. Somaiya Centre of Buddhist Studies, inaugurated by the 14th Dalai Lama in December 1993. In 1995, Somaiya Vidyavihar along with the Somaiya Trust established the K. J. Somaiya Medical College and its affiliated K. J. Somaiya Medical College & Research Centre in Sion, Mumbai, expanding its educational portfolio to 22 institutes in 1995. As of 2024, Somaiya Vidyavihar comprises 35 academic institutions.

In 2019, Somaiya Vidyavihar put forward a proposal to the Government of Maharashtra for the establishment of a university. Following the government's approval, Somaiya Vidyavihar University was founded, marking the first self-financed private university in Mumbai. The university is governed jointly by Somaiya Vidyavihar, the K. J. Somaiya Trust, and The Somaiya Trust.

In January 2024, the student satellite team at K. J. Somaiya Institute of Technology launched their amateur radio satellite, 'BeliefSat-0', from the Satish Dhawan Space Centre in Sriharikota. This launch was a collaboration with the Indian Space Research Organisation (ISRO) as part of their PSLV-C58 mission.

== Campus ==
Their institutions offer programs in a wide range of disciplines, including arts, sciences, management, engineering, medicine, humanities, philosophy, and social sciences. The institution's main campus is located in Mumbai, spread across two locations, a 65-acre complex in Vidyavihar and a 35-acre adjoining complex in Sion. In addition to its main campus, Somaiya Vidyavihar also offers autonomous postgraduate courses, vocational training programs, and high schools.

== Institutions ==
Institutions under Somaiya Vidyavihar Education Trust cater to various disciplines of education, with the following colleges under its fold.

Institution	Course	Year founded	Accreditation	Affiliation	Location
K J Somaiya College of Arts and Commerce	Degree	1959	NAAC	University of Mumbai, Autonomous	Vidyavihar, Mumbai
K J Somaiya Polytechnic	Engineering	1963	MSBTE	Autonomous	Vidyavihar, Mumbai
SMT Sakarbai K Somaiya Junior College of Education	Education	1963	AICTE	Autonomous	Vidyavihar, Mumbai
S K Somaiya Vinay Mandir Junior College	Higher Education	1965	MSBTE		Vidyavihar, Mumbai
K J Somaiya College of Science and Commerce	Degree	1972	NAAC	University of Mumbai	Vidyavihar, Mumbai
K J Somaiya Junior College of Arts and Commerce	Higher Education	1976	MSBTE		Vidyavihar, Mumbai
K J Somaiya Junior College of Science and Commerce	Higher Education	1976	NAAC	University of Mumbai, Autonomous	Vidyavihar, Mumbai
K J Somaiya Private Industrial Training Institute	Vocational	1988		NCVT, Maharashtra Knowledge Corporation Limited (MKCL)	Vidyavihar, Mumbai
K J Somaiya Medical College and Research Centre	Medical	1991	MCI	Maharashtra University of Health Sciences	Ayurvihar, Sion, Mumbai
S K Somaiya College of Arts, Science and Commerce	Degree	1995	NAAC	University of Mumbai	Vidyavihar, Mumbai
K J Somaiya Institute of Technology	Engineering	2001	NBA, NAAC, AICTE, DTE	University of Mumbai	Ayurvihar, Sion, Mumbai
K J Somaiya College of Physiotherapy	Physiotherapy	2002		Maharashtra University of Health Sciences	Ayurvihar, Sion, Mumbai
K J Somaiya College of Nursing	Nursing	2011	Maharashtra Nursing Council; Indian Nursing Council	Maharashtra University of Health Sciences	Ayurvihar, Sion, Mumbai
Somaiya School of Humanities and Social Science	Degree	2012	University Grants Commission	Somaiya Vidyavihar University	Vidyavihar, Mumbai
Somaiya Kala Vidya	Arts	2014			Adipur, Kutch, Gujarat

== Schools ==
In rural India, Somaiya Vidyavihar operates six schools across locations including Dahanu, Sakarwadi, Laxmiwadi, Kopargaon (Maharashtra), Kutch (Gujarat), Sameerwadi, Bagalkot (Karnataka), and Bhopal (Madhya Pradesh).

In 2019, Class 10 students of Somaiya Vidya Mandir Laxmiwadi and Somaiya Vidya Mandir Sakarwadi achieved a 90% pass rate in the Maharashtra State Secondary Certificate (SSC) examinations, with two female students topping their schools in rural Ahmednagar. In 2020, a student of Class 10th of Somaiya School achieved a top score in the Central Board of Secondary Education (CBSE) Class 10 examination for the Mumbai and Pune regions.

In June 2024, it opened Somaiya Vidya Mandir School in Rehti, Madhya Pradesh, to provide education to children from the Budhni, Rehti, Nasrullaganj and Obedullaganj regions.

School	Year founded	Accreditation/Affiliation	Location
Primary School	1942		Kopargaon, Ahmednagar district, Maharashtra
Somaiya Vidya Mandir, Sakarwadi	1959	Maharashtra State Board	Sakarwadi, Kopargaon, Ahmednagar district, Maharashtra
Somaiya Vidya Mandir - Laxmiwadi	1959	Maharashtra State Board	Laxmiwadi, Rahata, Ahmednagar district, Maharashtra
K.J.Somaiya Secondary School, Nareshwadi	1974	Maharashtra State Board	Nareshwadi, Palghar district, Maharashtra
Somaiya Shishu Niketan Primary School	1974	KSEEB	Sameerwadi, Mudhol, Bagalkot district, Karnataka
Sou. Leelaben M Kotak Primary School	1983	MSBTE	Nareshwadi, Palghar district, Maharashtra
Somaiya Vinaymandir High School	1984	KSEEB	Sameerwadi, Mudhol, Bagalkot district, Karnataka
K J Somaiya English Medium School	2004	CBSE	Sameerwadi, Mudhol, Bagalkot district, Karnataka
The Somaiya School	2012	CBSE	Vidyavihar, Mumbai
Shri Sharda English Medium School	2012	CBSE	Kopargaon, Maharashtra
Somaiya Vidya Mandir	2024		Bori Village, Rehti, Madhya Pradesh

== Leadership ==
At Somaiya Vidyavihar, the presidency is currently held by Samir Somaiya, who assumed the position in 2011.

Its first president was Natwarlal H. Bhagwati, a retired Supreme Court of India judge and former vice-chancellor of both the University of Bombay and Banaras Hindu University. Previously, the organisation was presided over by Justice P. N. Bhagwati, a former Chief Justice of India. Additionally, Karamshi Jethabhai Somaiya and S.K. Somaiya have both served as Vice Presidents and Presidents of Somaiya Vidyavihar in the past.

== Initiatives and activities ==
=== RiiDL ===
The Research Innovation Incubation Design Laboratory Foundation (RiiDL) was established in 2010 by Somaiya Vidyavihar as an initiative to promote entrepreneurship and innovation. RiiDL functions as a business incubator supported by the Government of India's Department of Science and Technology (DST), Department of Biotechnology (DBT), Biotechnology Industry Research Assistance Council (BIRAC), and the Maharashtra State Innovation Society (MSINS). It provides educational programs, infrastructure access, and connects startups with a network of mentors, investors, and advisors. Startup India selected RiiDL as one of the centers to celebrate National Startup Day in 2023.

=== Maker Mela ===
Since 2015, Somaiya Vidyavihar has hosted the annual Maker Mela, a platform for showcasing grassroots innovations in India across various fields including arts, crafts, engineering, science, and agriculture. The event features maker booths, speaker sessions, and cultural programs, attracting a diverse audience annually and organised by RiiDL.

=== Darwin ===
Darwin is an annual conference event organized by Somaiya Vidyavihar through Bioriidl, a part of the Riidl, to promote open science and bio-entrepreneurship. The event features talks, workshops, hackathons, and research symposiums.

== Recognition ==
Karamshi Jethabhai Somaiya, the founder, was posthumously awarded the Padma Bhushan, India's third-highest civilian award, in 2000 for his contributions to social work.

== Other ==
- Vidyavihar railway station and the Mumbai suburb of Vidyavihar derive their names from Somaiya Vidyavihar.

== Gallery ==
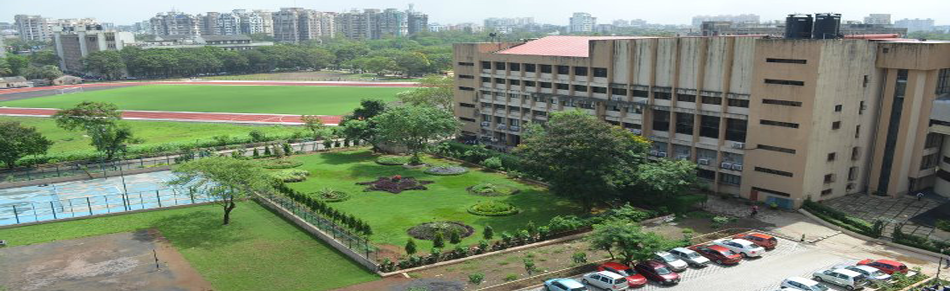
K. J. Somaiya Medical College & Research Centre

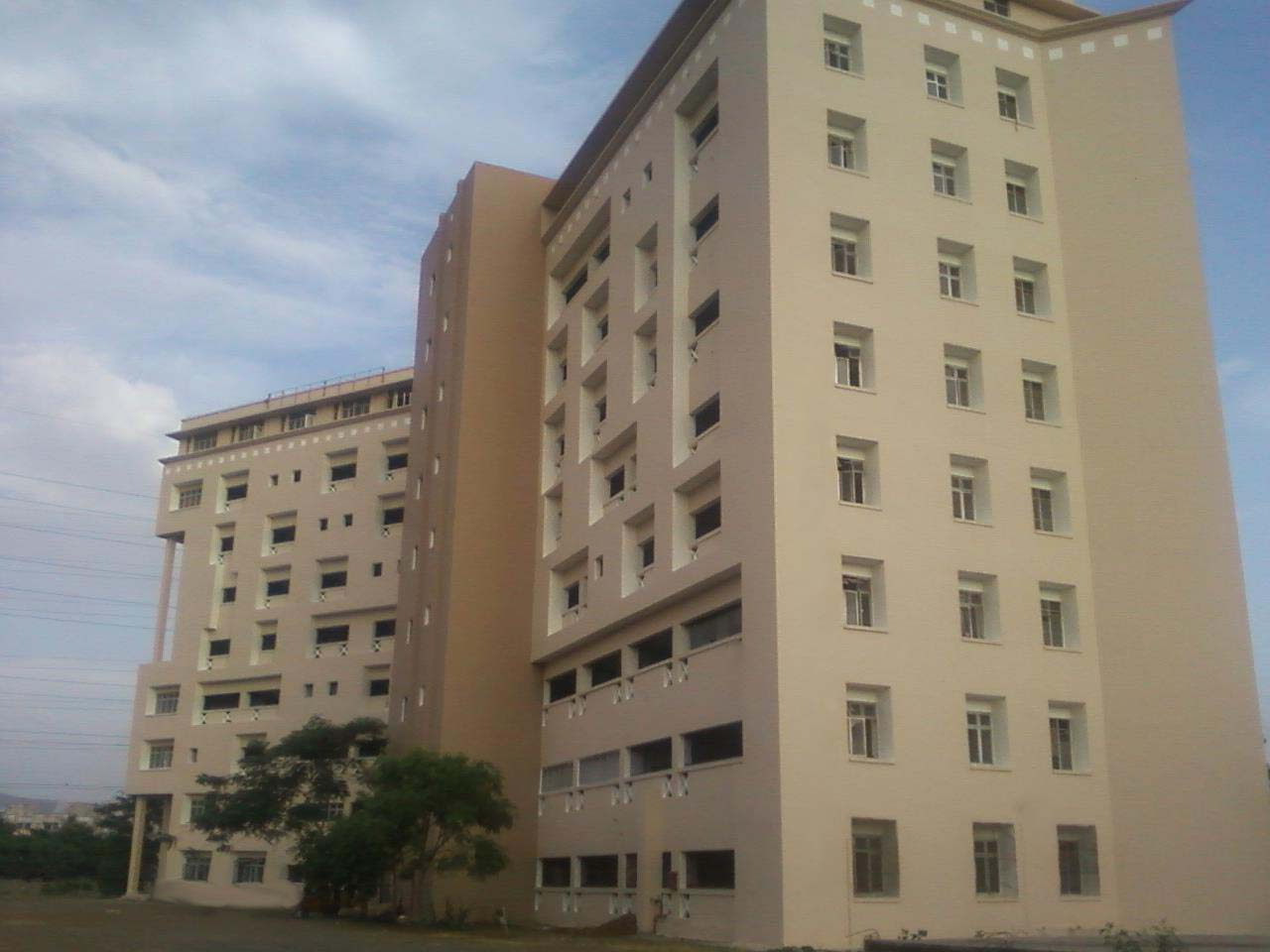
K. J. Somaiya Institute of Technology

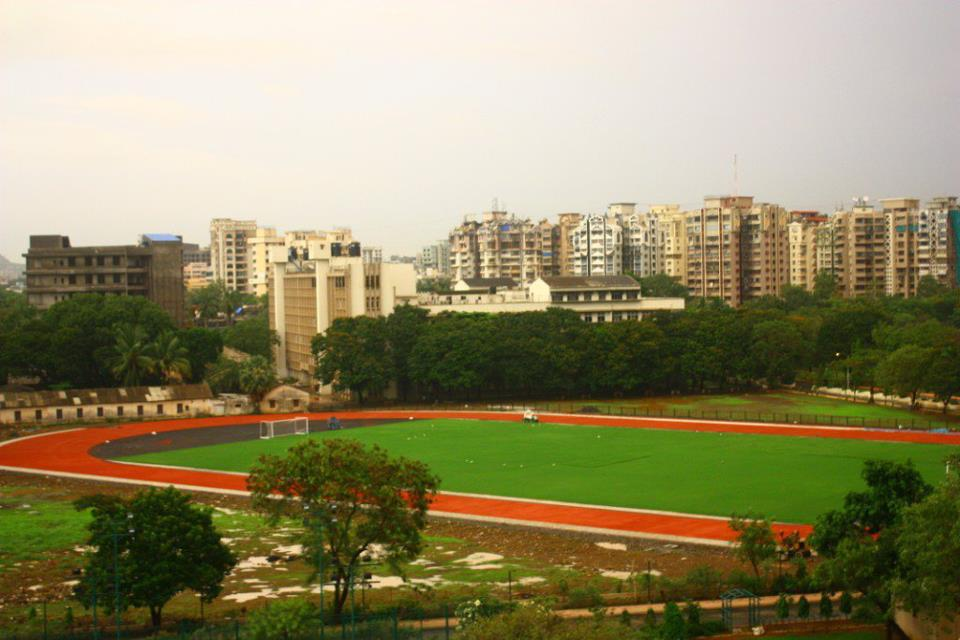
Running track at K J Somaiya Institute of Management

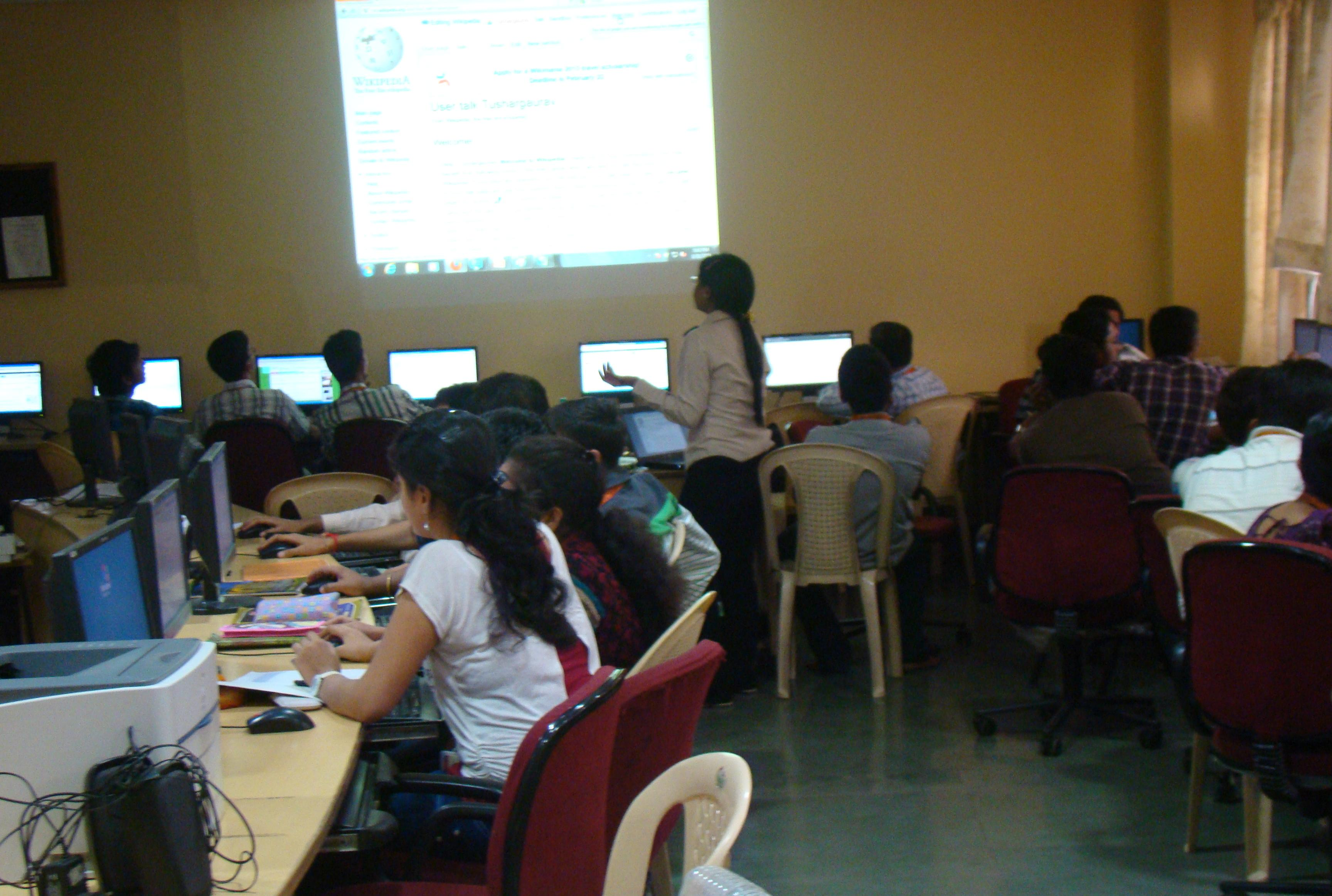
Wikipedia Editing Workshop at K. J. Somaiya Institute of Technology in 2013

At Somaiya Vidyavihar
