= K. J. Somaiya Institute of Management =

K J Somaiya Institute of Management
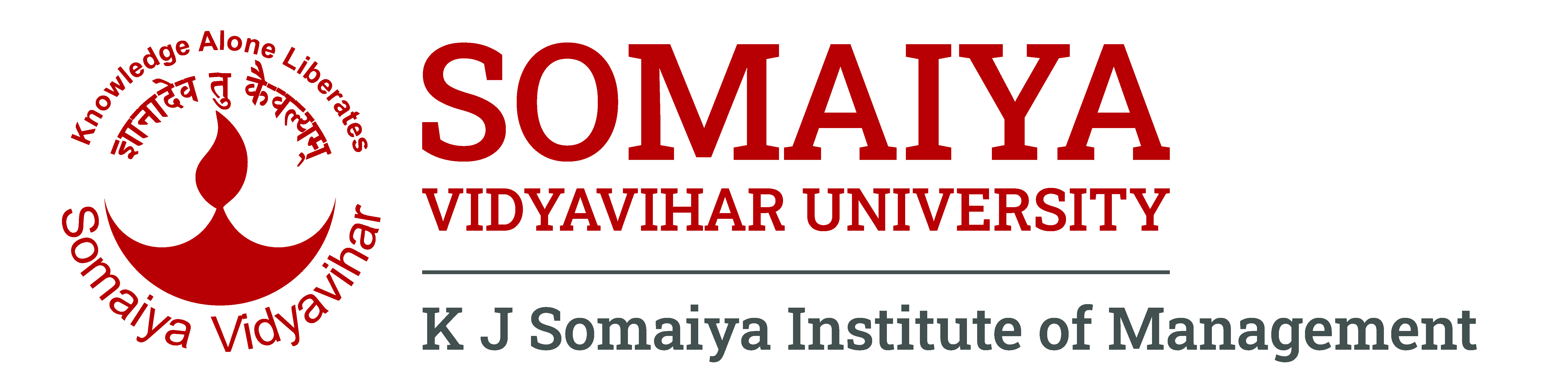
- Other name: KJSIM
- Type: Private business school
- Founder: Karamshi Jethabhai Somaiya
- Parent institution: Somaiya Vidyavihar University
- Director: Raman Ramachandran, Ph.D.
- Location: Mumbai, India; 19.0728°N 72.8978°E
- Campus: Urban
- Website: kjsim.somaiya.edu/en

The K J Somaiya Institute of Management (KJSIM) formerly known as K J Somaiya Institute of Management Studies & Research (SIMSR) is a private business school and a constituent school of Somaiya Vidyavihar University located in Vidyavihar, Mumbai.

It offers a range of MBA study programmes including ones which specialise in particular areas such as healthcare management, executive program and sports management. It also facilitates online study programmes for those in employment as well as the possibility of taking a PhD in management.
