= Business Perspectives and Research =

- Discipline: Management
- Language: English
- Edited by: Preeti S Rawat

Publication details
- History: 2015
- Publisher: SAGE Publications India Pvt. Ltd.
- Frequency: Bi-annual

Standard abbreviations
- ISO 4: Bus. Perspect. Res.

Indexing
- ISSN: 2278-5337 (print); 2394-9937 (web)
- OCLC no.: 827924397

Links
- Journal homepage; Online access; Online archive

Business Perspectives and Research (BPR) is an academic business and management journal that is published twice a year by Sage Publishing in association with the K. J. Somaiya Institute of Management Studies and Research in Mumbai. It is edited by Preeti S Rawat.

== Abstracting and indexing ==
Business Perspectives and Research is abstracted and indexed in:

- Australian Business Deans Council (ABDC)
- Chartered Association of Business Schools (CABS)
- DeepDyve
- Dutch-KB
- EBSCO
- Indian Citation Index (ICI)
- J-Gate
- OCLC
- Ohio
- Portico
- ProQuest Central
- ProQuest Central Basic
- ProQuest One Business
- ProQuest: ABI/INFORM Collection
- ProQuest: ABI/INFORM Global
- Proquest: Business Premium Collection
- SCOPUS
- UGC-CARE (GROUP II)
