= Sion Hillock Fort =

Hill fort in Mumbai, India

Sion Fort
- Sion, Mumbai, India
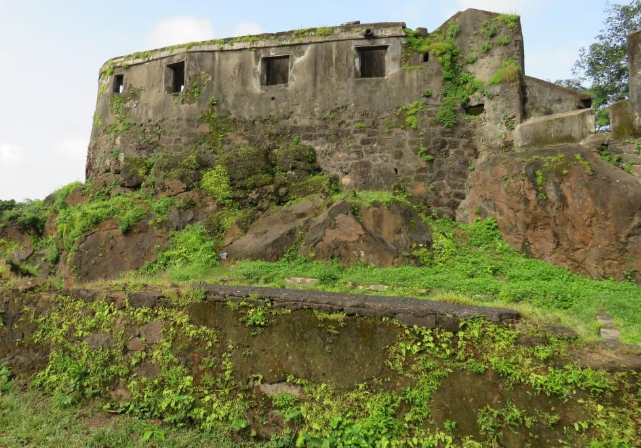
- View of Sion Fort from the base of the hillock

Site information
- Type: Hill Fort
- Owner: East India Company (1677–1947); Government of India (1947–Present)
- Open to the public: Yes
- Condition: Dilapidated

Location
- Coordinates: 19°02′48″N 72°52′03″E

Site history
- Built: 1669–1677
- Built by: Gerald Aungier
- Materials: Basalt and Lime mortar

Monument of National Importance
- Official name: Whole hill fort of Sion together with all ancient Portuguese remains of buildings situated to the north, east and south-east sides of the hill at its toe
- Reference no.: N-MH-M6

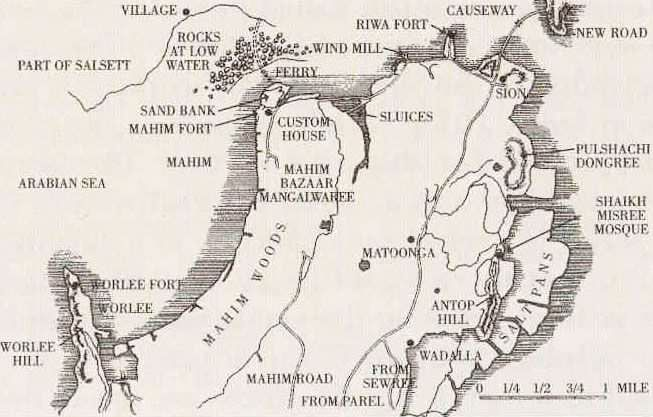
Old map of the region (post 1805).

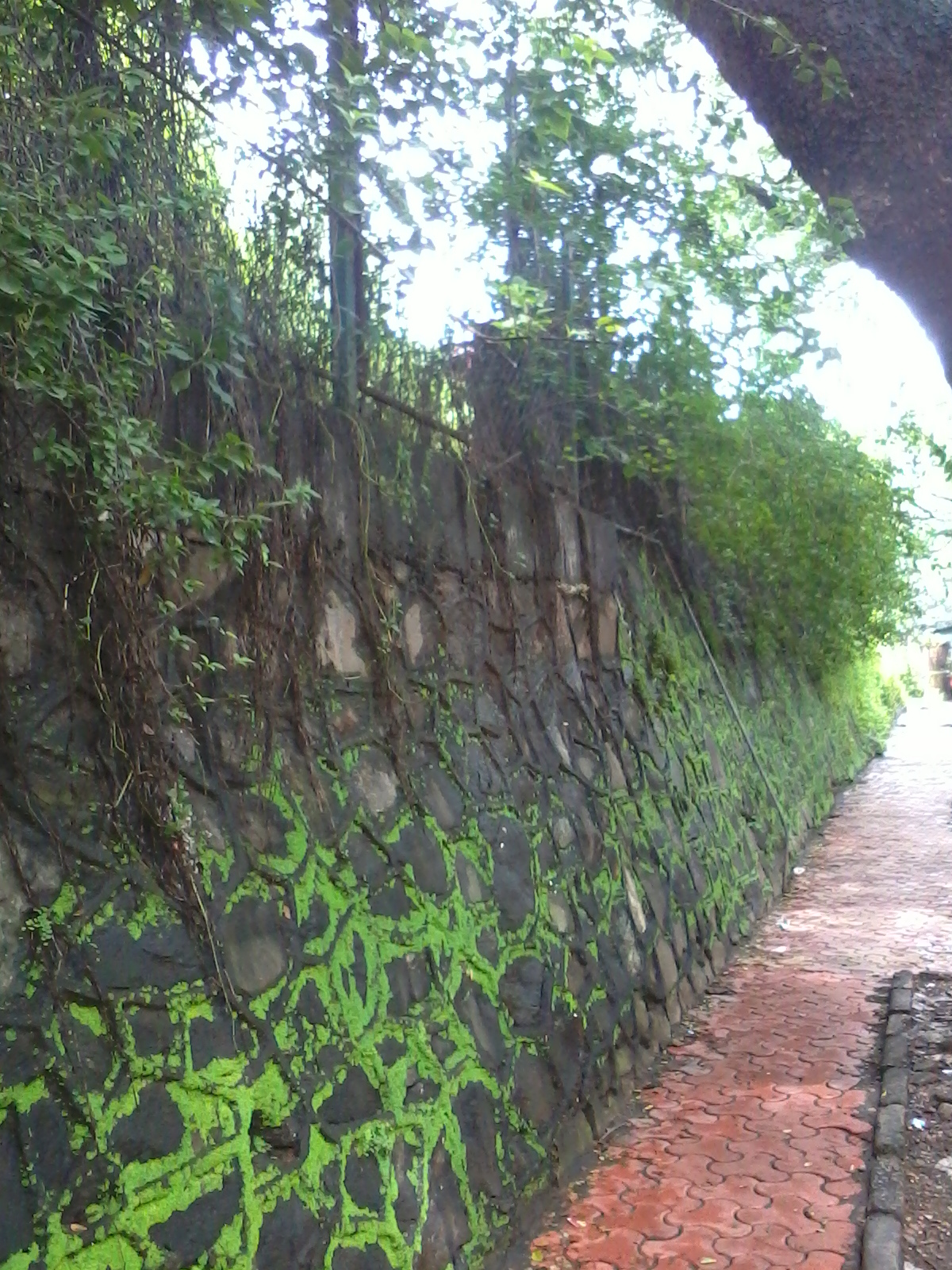
The outer wall of the fort

The Sion Hillock Fort is a fort in Mumbai (Bombay), India. It was built under the regime of the English East India Company, between 1669 and 1677, atop a conical hillock when Gerard Aungier was the Governor of Bombay. It was notified in 1925 as a Grade I Heritage structure. When it was built, the fort marked the boundary between British-held Parel island and the Portuguese held Salsette Island that lay to the north across the creek.

The hillock is situated 500 metres from the Sion railway station. At the base of the hill is the Mumbai Circle office of the Archaeological Survey of India, and a garden – the Pandit Jawaharlal Nehru Udyan. Nearby forts include the Riwa Fort and Sewri Fort.

The fort is dilapidated and a collection of broken stone steps, scattered walls and ruins, overrun by trees and ground cover. The fort wall has a small room on top. A series of pathways lead to it. The fort offers a panoramic view, overlooking the salt pans in the Thane Creek. However vandalism and apathy have taken their toll on the structure. Restoration of the fort had begun in 2009 but was stopped mid-way due to paucity of funds.

== Gallery ==
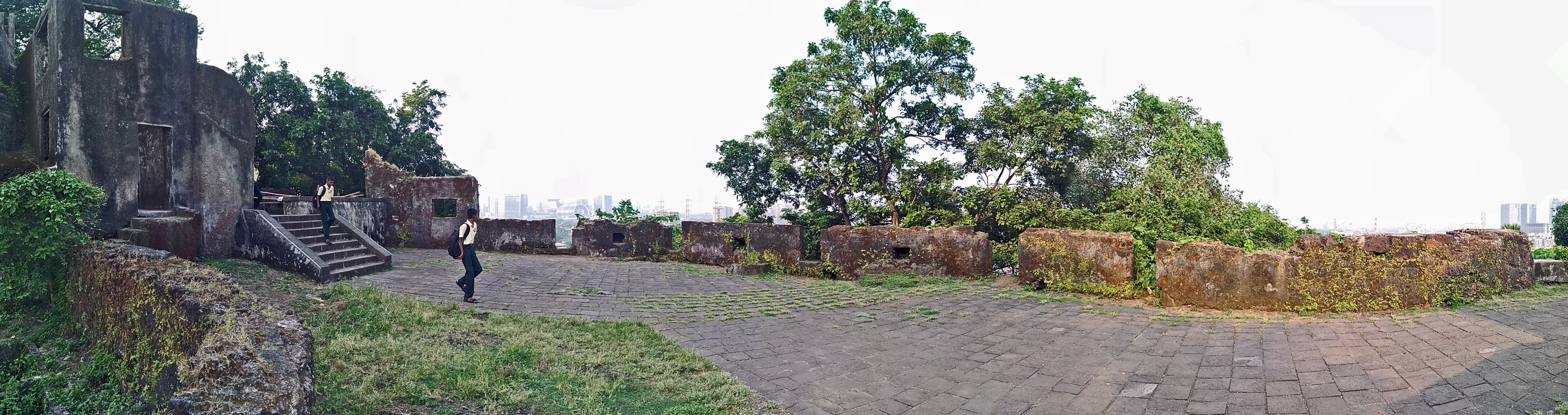
The fort together with all ancient Portuguese remains of buildings situated to the north, east and south-east sides of the hill

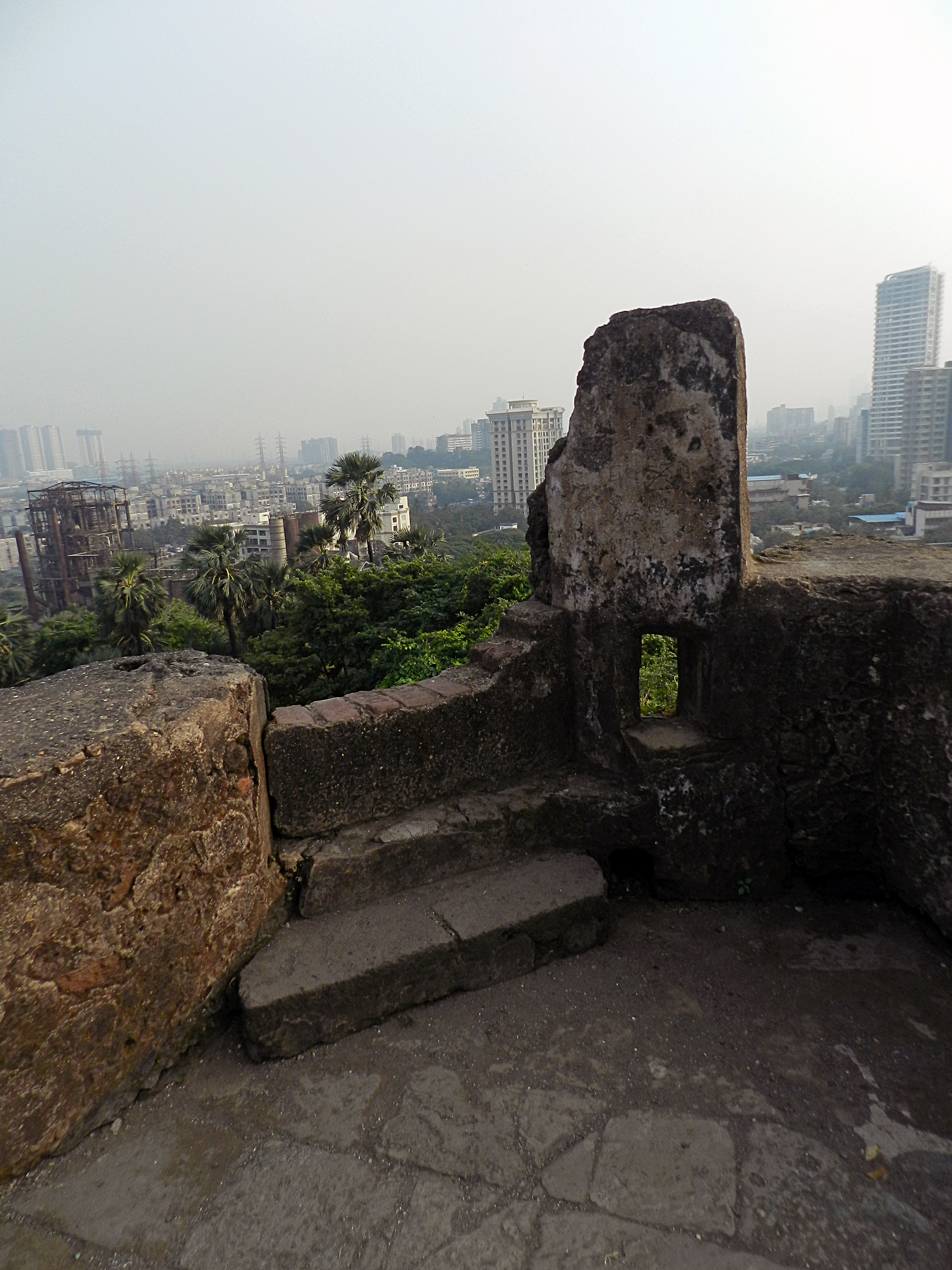
Fort walls

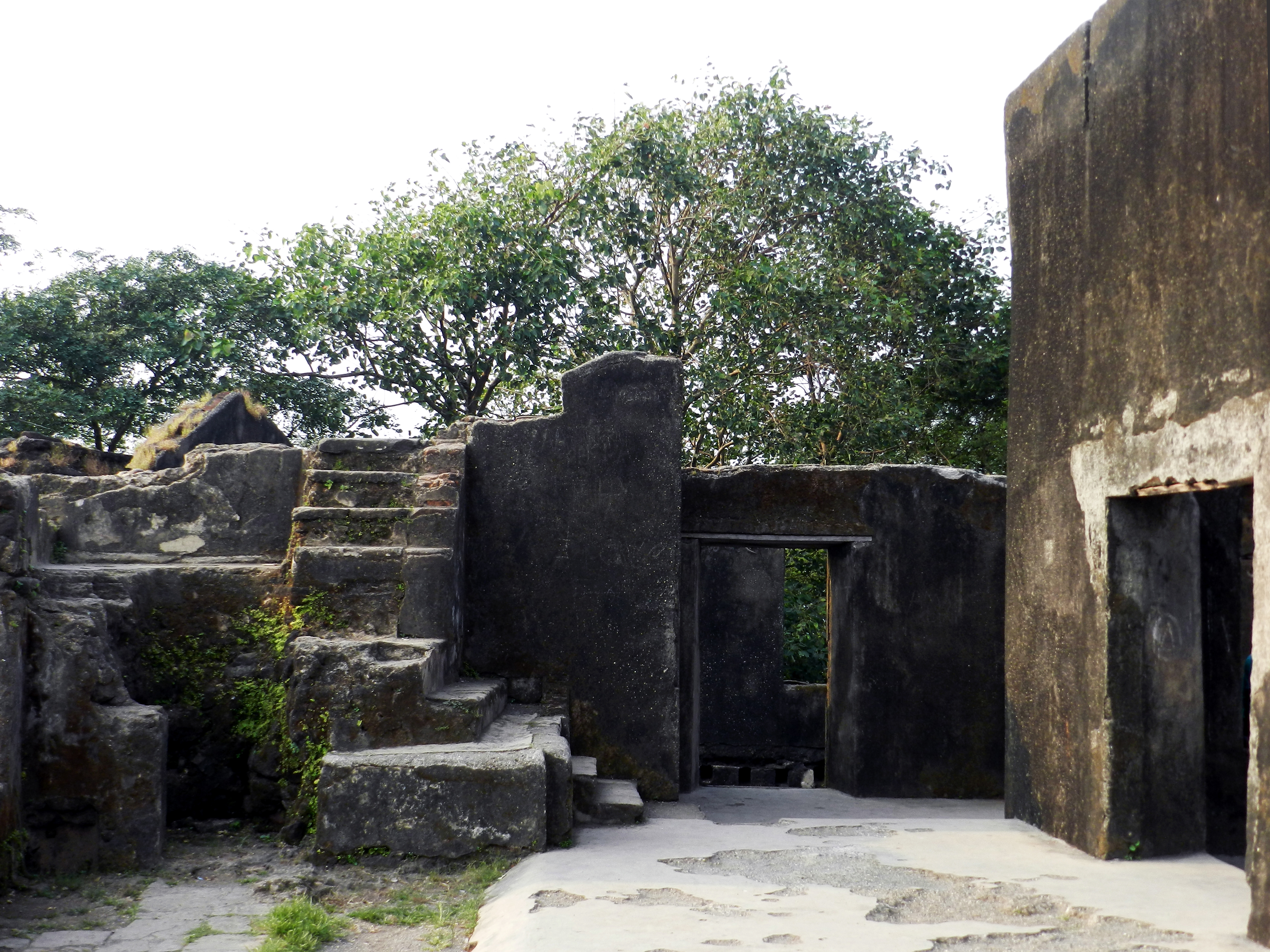
Fort walls

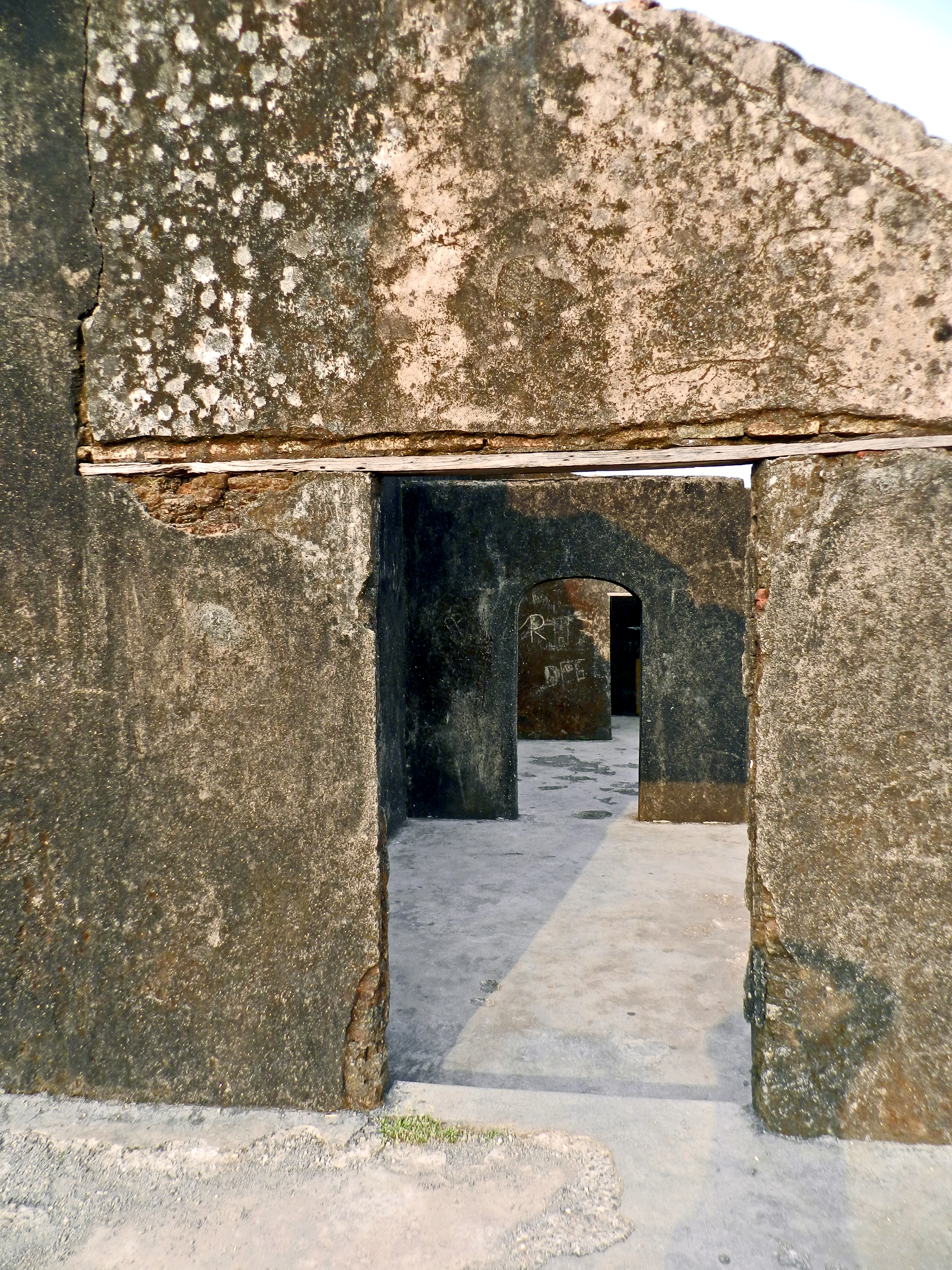
Fort walls

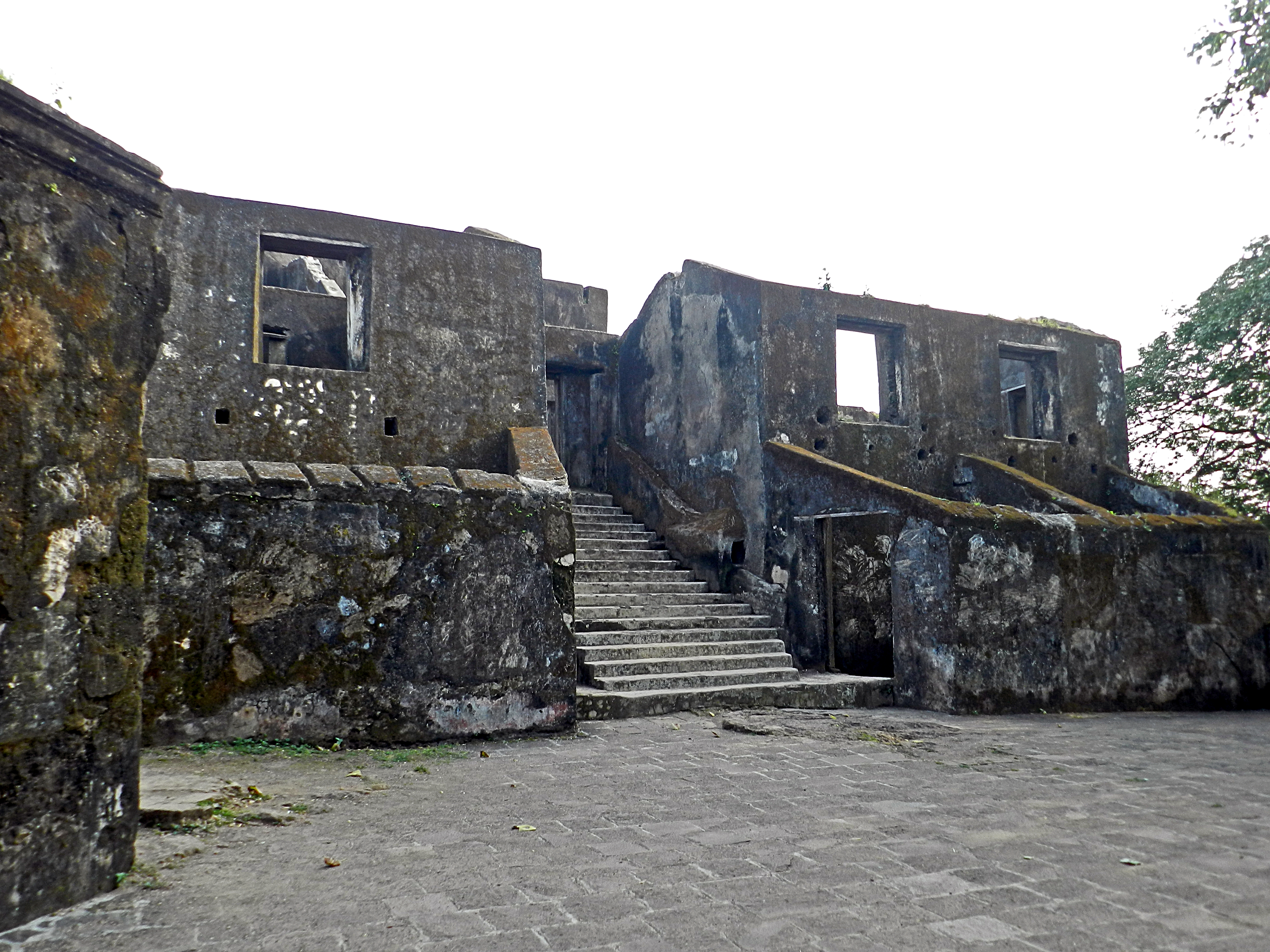
fort of Sion ancient Portuguese remains at Sion Fort

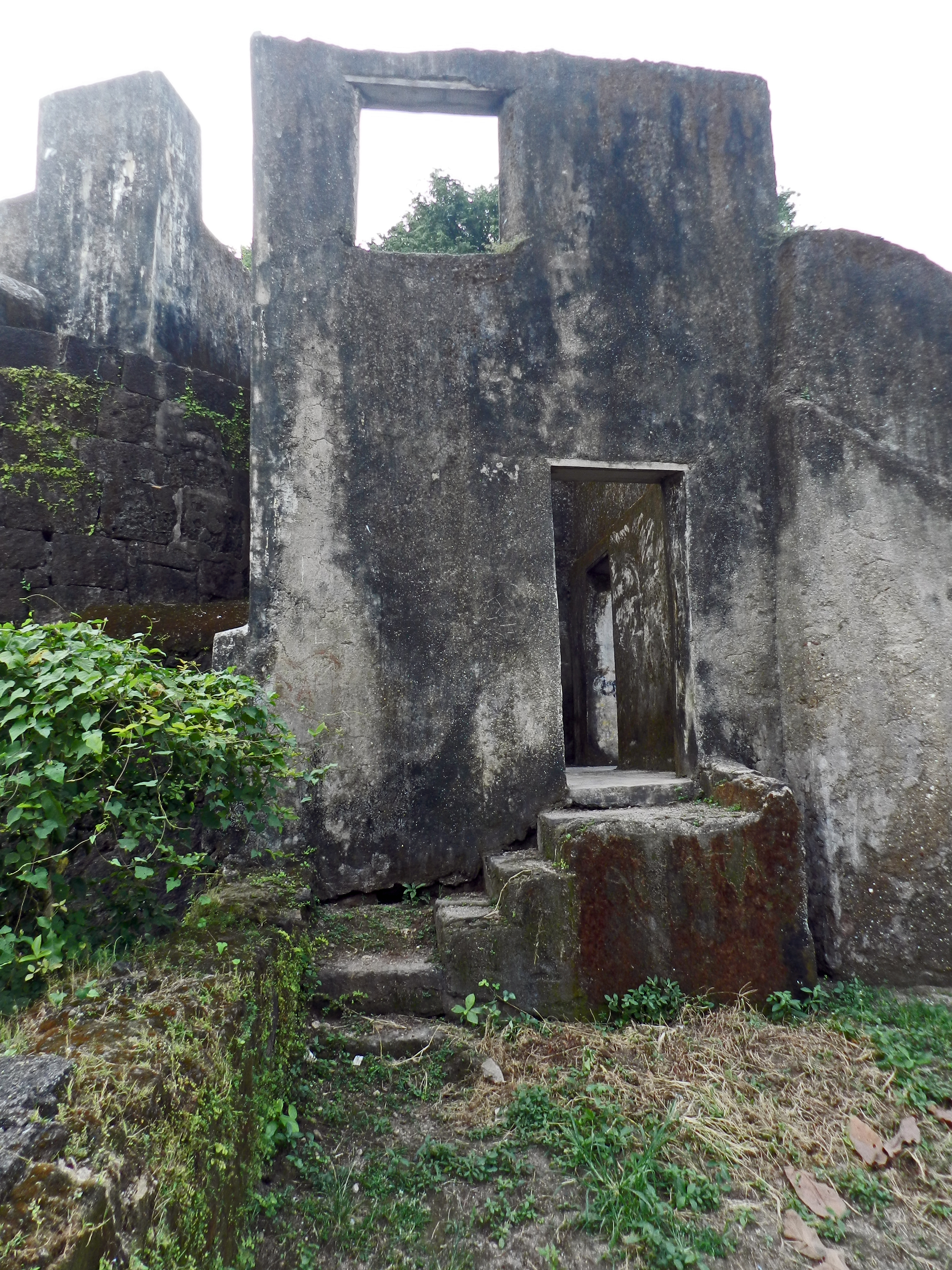
The fort

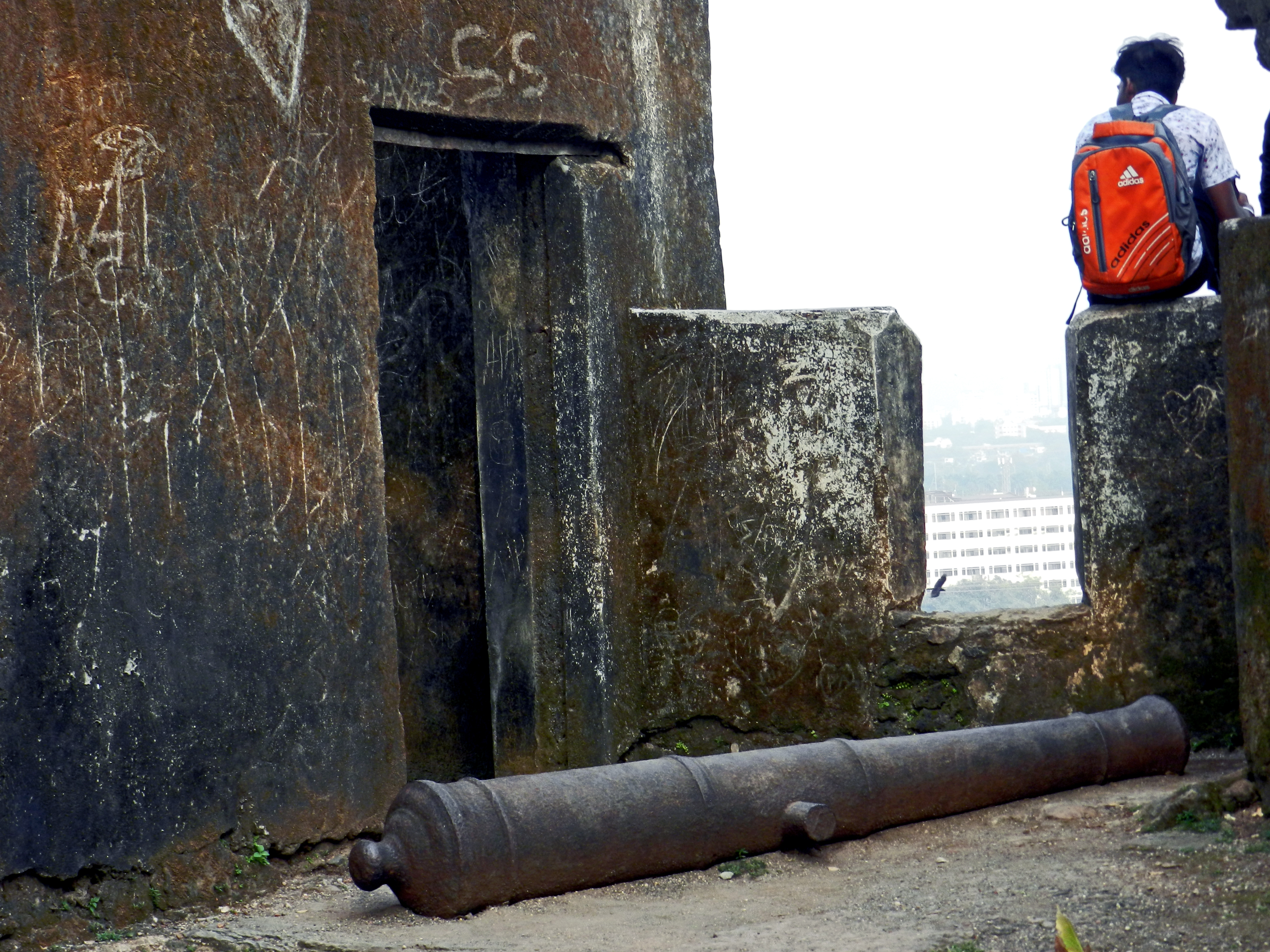
A Canon at the Fort

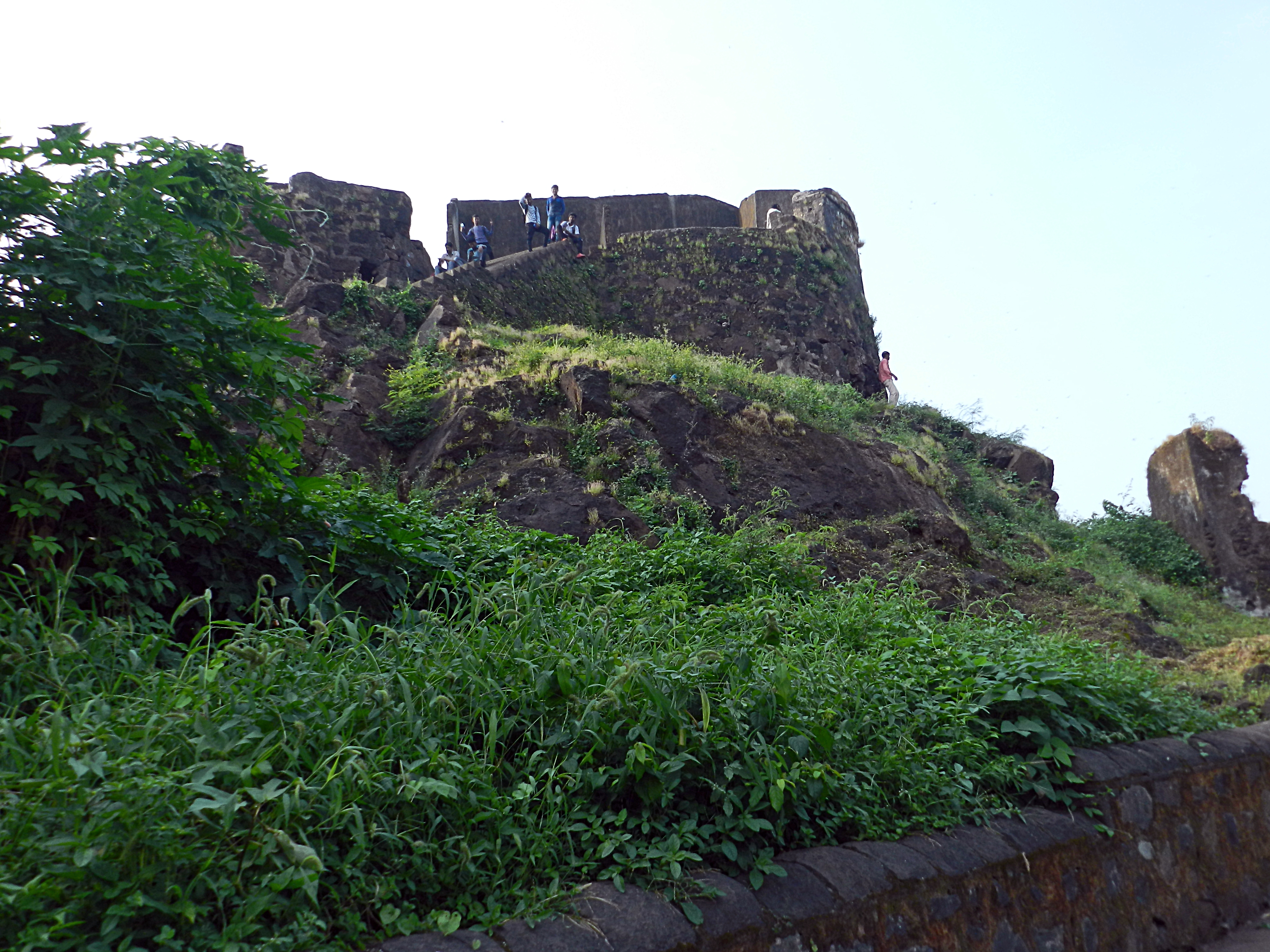
The fort on the hill

== See also ==
- History of Bombay under British rule
- List of forts in Maharashtra
