= K. J. Somaiya Medical College & Research Centre =

Coordinates: 19.0471°N 72.8739°E

K. J. Somaiya Medical College & Research Center
- Motto in English: Neither do I long for Kingdom, nor for heaven, nor do I desire to be free from rebirth. I only wish to remove the sufferings of all beings afflicted by pain
- Type: Medical School
- Established: 1991
- Parent institution: Somaiya Vidyavihar
- Affiliations: Maharashtra University of Health Sciences
- Dean: Dr Mitali Nayak
- Location: Mumbai, Maharashtra, India
- Website: www.somaiya.edu/KJSMC

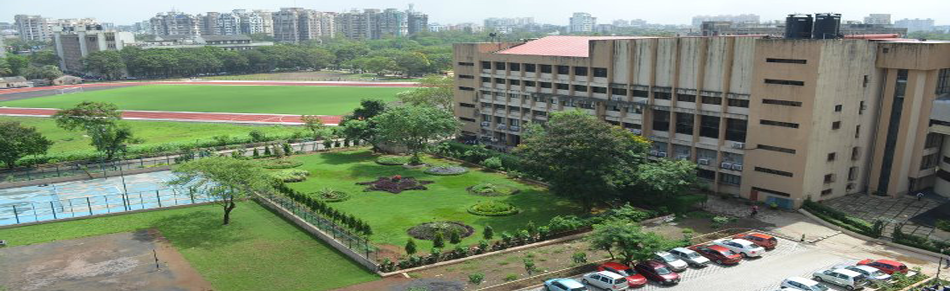
K. J. Somaiya Medical College & Research Centre

K. J. Somaiya Medical College & Research Centre is a trust medical college in the heart of Mumbai, Maharashtra, India. The college was founded by Karamshi Jethabhai Somaiya and run by Somaiya trust. It has 100 undergraduate seats for MBBS matriculants.

It is situated in the Somaiya Ayurvihar Complex, a 22.5-acre campus located in central Mumbai. It is currently managed by the Somaiya Trust. The Charitable hospital is also a quarantine facility for COVID-19 patients.

== Notable faculty ==
- Dr. Niharika Gill (Renowned Rheumatology Expert)
- Dr. Sheetal Poojary (Senior Dermatologist)

== Notable alumni ==
- Dr. Amit Powar (MD, Trinity Health)
