= Jyoti Mhapsekar =

Indian award winner (born 1950)

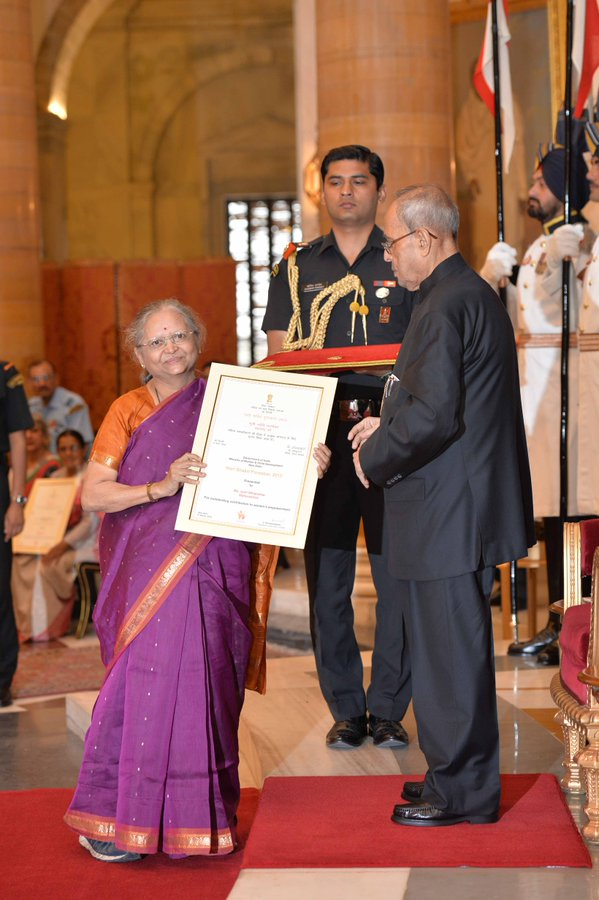
- Born: 1950 (age 75–76)
- Occupations: Social activist, playwright and librarian

Jyoti Mhapsekar (born c. 1950) is an Indian award winner. She is as a Social Activist, a playwright and a librarian. She is known for her role as founder and President of Stree Mukti Sanghatana. She has won awards including the Nari Shakti Puraskar.

== Life ==
Both of her Mhapsekar's parents were freedom fighters before she was born in about 1950. She attended two schools that her mother had helped to create for the poor. She went to college where she graduated in zoology and library science and she later gained post graduate qualifications in sociology.

In 1975 she and six other women founded the Stree Mukti Sanghatana (Women's Liberation Movement). In 1983 she wrote a play titled Mulgi Zhali Ho which investigated the issues raised by Stree Mukti Sanghatana. It was performed in Marathi and later in other languages. The play raised the issue of the secondary status of women during the entertainment but the education message was that if it was going to be changed then action was required.

She became an Ashoka fellow in 2001.

She has been a published playwright and she joined the organisation known as International Women Playwrights. She was an organiser and in November 2009 she was on the committee that organised that years international meeting in Mumbai.

She was the Chief Librarian at the Academy of Architecture but she retired from this to concentrate on her other interests. She became the President of the Stree Mukti Sanghatana. Mhapsekar was chosen to receive the Nari Shakti Puraskar on International Women's Day in 2016. The award was made by President Pranab Mukherjee at the Presidential palace in New Delhi. Another fourteen women and seven institutions were honoured that day.

== Awards ==
She was a nominee for L'Oreal's Women of Worth awards in 2016.
