= K. J. Somaiya School of Engineering =

College in Mumbai

- KJSSE
- Motto: ज्ञानादेव तु कैवल्यम्
- Type: Private, engineering college
- Established: 1983; 43 years ago
- Parent institution: Somaiya Vidyavihar
- Affiliations: Somaiya Vidyavihar University
- Director: Dr Suresh Ukarande
- Students: 2,554
- Location: Mumbai, Maharashtra, India; 19.0735°N 72.8995°E
- Website: www.somaiya.edu/kjsce

Established in 1983, the K. J. Somaiya College of Engineering (KJSCE) was affiliated to the University of Mumbai. The college received autonomous status in 2014 and since 2019 the college is a constituent school to Somaiya Vidyavihar University. In 2025, it was renamed as K J Somaiya School of Engineering (KJSSE).

It offers 4-year bachelor's degree engineering courses, 2-year postgraduate programmes and runs PhD research centres in various disciplines. KJSSE is situated in Somaiya Vidyavihar University campus, which is spread across approximately 65 acres land. Earlier it was also one of the only 7 autonomous engineering colleges in Mumbai.

== Academics ==
The institute offers nine courses for Bachelors in technology, namely :

- Undergraduate programme in Artificial Intelligence and Data Science Engineering
- Undergraduate programme in Computer Engineering (since 1999)
- Undergraduate programme in Computer Science and Business Systems (since 2024)
- Undergraduate programme in Computer and Communication Engineering
- Undergraduate programme in Electronics Engineering(VLSI Design and Technology)
- Undergraduate programme in Electronics and Computer Engineering
- Undergraduate programme in Electronics Engineering (Since 1983)
- Undergraduate programme in Electronics and Telecommunications Engineering (Since 1996)
- Undergraduate programme in Information Technology (since 1999)
- Undergraduate programme in Mechanical Engineering (since 1983)
- Undergraduate programme in Robotics and Artificial Intelligence Engineering

The postgraduate courses offered include :

- M. Tech in Artificial Intelligence & Data Science
- M. Tech in Computer Engineering
- M. Tech in Electronics Engineering(VLSI Design and Technology)
- M. Tech in Agriculture Science and Technology
- M. Tech in Electronics and Telecommunication Engineering
- M. Tech in Information Technology with specialisation in Information Security
- M. Tech in Interdisciplinary programme in Energy Engineering
- M. Tech in Mechanical Engineering with specialisation in CAD, CAM & Robotics
- M. Tech in Robotics & Automation Engineering

Ph.D. programmes:

- Computer Engineering
- Electronics Engineering
- Electronics & Telecommunication Engineering
- Information Technology
- Mechanical Engineering

Apart from this, the institute also runs various honours, minors and certificate programmes.

== Student associations ==
KJSSE has various technical, cultural, literary, Mathematics club, coding clubs, entrepreneurship club, social initiatives students' associations.

Technical Students' Chapters

- Computer Society of India (CSI)
- Association for Computing Machinery(ACM)
- CodeCell
- Emfinity Maths Club
- Electrical Engineering Students Association EESA
- e-Yantra
- Institution of Electronics and Telecommunication Engineers IETE
- Indian Society of Heating, Refrigerating and Air Conditioning Engineers (ISHRAE)
- Indian Society for Technical Education (ISTE)
- Mechanical Engineering Students Association (MESA)
- Society of Automotive Engineers SAE
- Student Association of Humanities and Science (SAHAS)

KJSSE Mega Projects

- The Marine Robotics Team, TMRT is the underwater robotics and offshore engineering team.
- Team Onyx India is the aero design club
- Redshift Racing India is the official BAJA SAE team
- Team Eta is a student team that participates annually in the Shell Eco-Marathon, one of the world's leading energy efficiency competition programmes.
- Orion Racing India the official formula student team
- Robocon is a team dedicated to the field of robotics

KJSSE Cultural Teams

- Shutterbugs KJSCE, The Official Photography Club of KJSCE.
- KJSCE Palinoia Official Classical Dance Team of KJSCE.
- Rhapsody KJSCE Official Drama team.
- Team Yugandhar Official Marathi Drama team.
- KJSCE Insignia The Official Art Team of KJSCE.
- TEAM GYRATIONS Official Dance Team of KJSCE.

== Rankings ==
The National Institutional Ranking Framework (NIRF) ranked it 197th among engineering colleges in 2021. It has not appeared in the ranking since.

== See also ==
- List of Mumbai Colleges
- Karamshi Jethabhai Somaiya
