= Sudha Menon =

Indian author, writing coach, model, actor, and motivational speaker

- Born: 9 October; Mumbai, India
- Education: SIES College of Arts, Science & Commerce
- Occupation: Writer
- Writing career
- Genre: Non-fiction
- Website: www.sudhamenon.com

Sudha Menon is an author, actor, motivational speaker and founder of writing workshop series, Get Writing and Writing With Women. She is the author of six non-fiction books: 'Recipes For Life', Feisty at Fifty, Legacy: Letters to their daughters from eminent Indian men and women, Gifted: inspirational stories of people with disabilities, and Devi, Diva or She-Devil: The Smart Career woman's survival guide and Leading Ladies: Women Who Inspire India. Her books have been translated into several Indian languages including Marathi, Hindi, Malayalam, Kannada, Bengali and Tamil.

== Early life and career ==
Sudha was born in suburban Mumbai where she completed her studies before pursuing her childhood dream of becoming a journalist. After putting in over 20 years as a journalist at The Independent (Bennet Coleman), The Hindu Business Line (Kasturi & Sons Lt) and Mint ( HT Media), she decided to follow her other dream, of authoring a book. Her first book, Leading Ladies: Women Who Inspire India, (42Bookz Galaxy) on the inspiring journeys of some of the country’s most admired and accomplished women, was launched in end 2010.

In early 2012, she launched her next book, Legacy, (Random House India) a collection of letters to their daughters from eminent Indian men and women. The book provided a rare insight into the minds of these leaders who set aside their public images to reveal to their daughters the lessons that they learnt along their own journeys and the values that they adopted to lead a responsible and fulfilled life.

Sudha's next book, Gifted: Inspiring stories of people with disabilities (Random House), was co-written with V.R.Ferose and launched in mid-2014. "Listening to their stories of struggle and their eventual triumph over the most insurmountable challenges was a transformative experience. I will never again presume that people with disabilities are incapable of doing the things that "normally-abled" people can do. There is much we can learn from the lives of those with disabilities," Having found her true calling as an author, Menon says she felt compelled to tell the world about the liberating and therapeutic value of writing down one’s thoughts.

Her book Devi, Diva or She-Devil: The Smart Career Woman’s Survival Guide is a book containing "survival tips" for career women, from some Indian women.

Feisty at Fifty presents a reflective and humorous account of the author’s experiences in her fifties, exploring themes of ageing and personal development.

Sudha is founder of 'Get Writing!, a writing workshop that helps people kick start their writing journey and 'Writing in the Park', an initiative that she started to get people to spend time in the outdoors, writing in public parks and gardens. Her Writing With Women (WWW) gets women from different backgrounds together to share their experiences and write about them.

She also runs "Telling Our Stories", a voluntary initiative where she works with senior citizens in Pune to help them write their stories and thus capture the legacy that they will leave for posterity. Sudha draws inspiration from the most ordinary people and their extraordinary courage in the face of life's knocks.

Sudha is a motivational speaker who has conducted numerous inspirational workshops and women's leadership sessions for various corporate houses, educational institutions and NGO's across the country. She was a speaker at TEDxPune 2013 edition. She has also spoken on other platforms including CII, IiECON and at BITS, Pilani Sudha lives in Pune with her husband, an IT professional and daughter, a pastry chef.

== Books ==
- Legacy: Letters from Eminent Parents to Their Daughters
- Gifted : Inspiring Stories of People with Disabilities
- Leading Ladies: Women Who Inspire India
- Devi, Diva or She-Devil: The smart career woman's survival guide
- Feisty at Fifty
- Recipes for Life

== Media reviews ==
Reviews on of Recipes For Life,

Reviews on Feisty At Fifty (It is a part-funny, part thought-provoking look at her adventures as a woman of fifty-plus years and could be a precious guide to women of that age who want to make their fifties the best decade of their life),

== See also ==
- List of Indian writers
