= Stree Mukti Sanghatana =

Stree Mukti Sanghatana (Women's Liberation Organization) is a non-governmental organisation founded in 1975 working for the empowerment of women, chiefly by creating awareness in the society about women’s issues and improving the lives of women through education, healthcare, and gender equality. It is an autonomous, registered organization that is not affiliated with any political party or political group.

It has centers in Dadar, Chembur, Parel, and Govandi in Mumbai, Vashi and Koparkhairane in Navi Mumbai and Thane. Other cities like Pune, Buldhana and Osmanabad also have centres.

== History ==
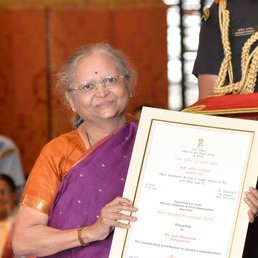
Jyoti Mhapsekar

Stree Mukti Sanghatana (SMS) was founded in 1975 by Jyoti Mhapsekar, Sharada Sathe and others.

== Mission ==
SMS lists the following missions on its website.

- To create a gender just world
- To create conducive atmosphere to achieve gender equality through large-scale campaigns
- To work for eradication of poverty and violence
- To work for creating instruments of change for women especially in field of law and law enforcement

== Activities ==
SMS works in the fields of Women's rights, education, healthcare, gender equality and environment.

The organization runs 10 daycare centers for children of working mothers.

Its adolescent sensitization program called "Jidnyasa" (Curiosity) is oriented towards school going children covering gender issues, stress management, "saying no to drugs", sexuality and environmental concerns.

It has set up seven family counselling centers that help women who are victims of domestic abuse.

For awareness, the play performed by the SMS cultural troupe "Mulgi Zhali Ho (A Girl is Born)."

It publishes a magazine called "Prerak Lalkari" (Clarion Call) in Marathi.

== Work with Rag Pickers and Solid Waste Management ==
SMS began work with rag pickers in 1998, with the launch of Parisar Vikas. Parisar Vikas, one of the NGO's key programmes, aims to recycle waste and create zero-waste cities. It aims to organize the waste pickers, educate them, and provide the women with health and counselling services. More than 5,000 women have so far benefitted from the organization’s continued pursuit of its goal that waste-picking should be given its rightful place in the economy of a city. SMS was responsible for setting up the city’s first child-care center for children of waste-picker women, started an adult literacy campaign in Chembur and aided the formation of the rag-pickers’ union in 1989-90. In 2004, the Federation of self-help groups of Waste pickers was registered. It has raised resources for educating more than 5,000 children of waste-picker women so far.

In 2003, SMS operated the first bio-gas plant for the Brihanmumbai Municipal Corporation (BMC). Since then, it has obtained contractual work with several educational institutes, residential colonies and business centers for maintaining and operating bio-gas plants and compost pits.

From 2013 - 2015 SMS successfully completed the "Decentralized waste recycling and management by the association of waste-pickers in the city of Mumbai" a project sanctioned by UNDP (SGP).

== Recognition ==
In 1999, SMS was accredited with ECOSOC (UNITED NATIONS).
