= SIES College of Management Studies =

- Logo of SIES College of Management Studies
- Motto: Rise With Education
- Type: Private
- Established: 1995
- Affiliations: University of Mumbai
- Director: Dr. Madhavi Dhole
- Location: Nerul, Navi Mumbai, Maharashtra, India; 19°2′33.24″N 73°1′23.65″E
- Campus: Urban
- Website: www.siescoms.edu.in

SIES College of Management Studies (SIESCOMS) is a South Indian Education Society (SIES) campus located in Nerul, a node of Navi Mumbai. SIESCOMS was established in 1995 with the primary objective of providing quality management education and managing company.

== History ==
SIESCOMS was promoted by SIES in 1995. It is the prime constituent of its academic complex at Nerul. Over a period of time, SIESCOMS has been catering to the needs of various segments of management education aspirants.

== Academics ==
SIESCOMS's main programmes are a two-year full-time course in Masters in Management Studies (Mumbai University) and Post Graduate Diploma in Management (PGDM- autonomous) . The Post Graduate Diploma in Management program and the other PGDM-Biotechnology and Pharmaceutical Managements comes under the SIES Business school whereas the Masters of management studies, a Mumbai university affiliated course is a part of SIESCOMS. SIESCOMS also has full-time Master in Computer Application (MCA), which is a two-year programme from year 2020, aiming at creating managers specially for IT sector. The college also offers a doctoral program in collaboration with Bengal Engineering and Science University, Shibpur (BESUS), Kolkata. Other special programs include a two-year program on Biotechnology Business Management, and a one-year program on Social Enterprise Management targeted at the NGO sector, from new centre at Sion.

== Rankings ==
Institute rankings

Business/Management – India
- Private colleges
- Outlook India (2020): 88

SIESCOMS was ranked 88 among management schools in India by Outlook India's "Top 150 Private MBA Institutions".

SIESCOMS was ranked 21 among B-Schools in India by The Times of India "Best B-School Survey 2021".
