= SIES College of Commerce and Economics =

Educational institute in Mumbai, India

- Motto: Rise With Education
- Type: Co-education
- Established: May 1989
- Affiliations: University of Mumbai; Maharashtra State Board of Secondary and Higher Secondary Education
- Principal: Nina Roy Choudhary
- Academic staff: 68
- Students: 3600+
- Location: Mumbai, Maharashtra, India
- Nickname: New SIES
- Mascot: Tambi
- Website: www.siesce.net

SIES College of Commerce & Economics is an educational institute located at Sion, Mumbai. Established by the South Indian Education Society, the college is a South Indian linguistic minority institution.

== History ==
SIES College of Commerce & Economics was established by the South Indian Education Society in May 1989.

College started with a single faculty college with over 400 students, 7 Lecturers and 1 Librarian which now has post graduate and undergraduate courses in Commerce, IT, Management, Banking & Insurance, Accounting & Finance to over 2692 students. The Junior College with 1000 students give the college a combined strength of over 3600 students. This college is affiliated to University of Mumbai.

== Courses ==
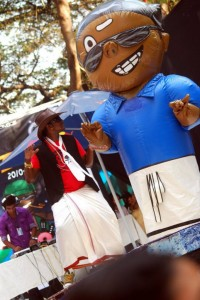
"Tambi" - Mascot of SIES College of Commerce and Economics Festival "Fantasies".

=== Junior College ===
- FYJC
- SYJC

=== Degree College ===
- B.Com
- BMS
- B.Sc.(IT)
- B.Com. (Accounting & Finance)
- B.Com. (Banking & Insurance)
- B.Com. (Financial Markets)
- B.Sc. (Information Technology)

== Grades ==
It received an A grade from the NAAC Peer in 2009. The college is also ISO 9001:2008 certified.

== Infrastructure/Facilities ==
- Gymkhana and Canteen in Ground floor.
- College Library cum Reading hall with internet facilities in First floor.
- B.Sc (IT) / Electronic / Telecommunication / Computer-Lab.
- Internet Facility Available in All Systems.

== Fests ==
SIES students organize & participate in various events each year.

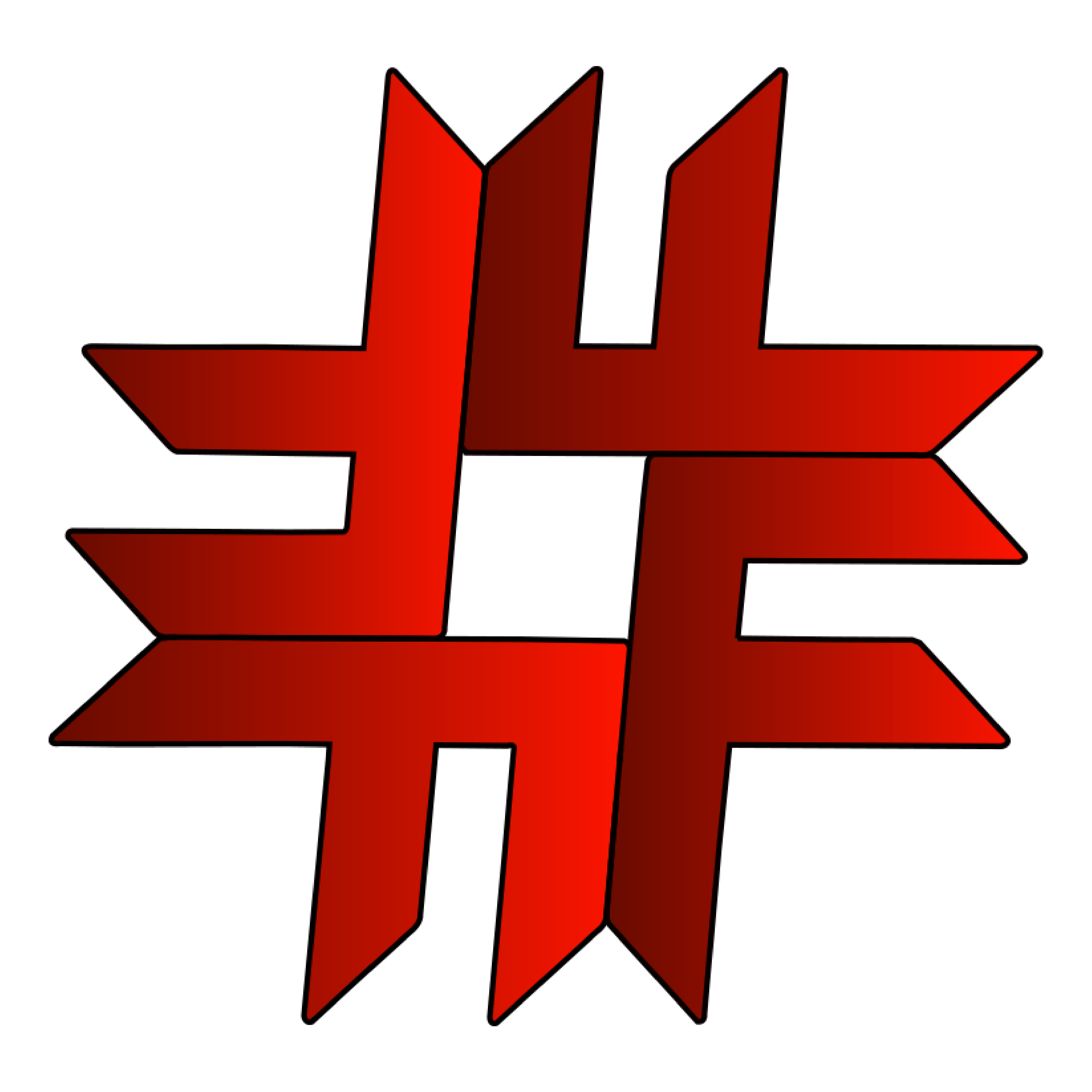
Official Logo of Fantasies Fest

- Disha

A career fest, which not only educates the students about various career options but also brings eminent personalities to guide them.

- Fantasies

Fantasies is the cultural festival of SIES College of Commerce & Economics. It is one of the inter-collegiate events organized by the students in Central Mumbai Zone. It has over 60 events and gathers a crowd of over 6000 for the three-day festival. Its standout event, Thunderstruck, showcases India's finest bands performing live at Shanmukhananda Auditorium.

- EDIT

IT Tech Fest organized by the B.Sc.(I.T.) department of the college which is held every year. The events organized by EDIT are categorized as lab, non-lab, classroom and fillers. Although it is a tech fest, there are events for students from various streams to enjoy.

- FIONTRAI

Fiontrai also an intercollegiate program of our BBI department aims at providing exposure to the students by giving them opportunities to give presentation in front of various personalities who have achieved great heights in the same field. Encouraging students to set stalls on the main event day to cultivate entrepreneurship among them.

== See also ==
- SIES College of Arts, Science, and Commerce
- SIES Nerul
