= Vidyavihar =

- Suburb
- Location within Mumbai
- Coordinates: 19.080°N 72.896°E
- Country: India
- State: Maharashtra
- District: Mumbai Suburban
- City: Mumbai

Government
  - Type: Municipal Corporation
  - Body: Brihanmumbai Municipal Corporation (MCGM)

Languages
  - Official: Marathi
- Time zone: UTC+5:30 (IST)
- Area code: 022
- Lok Sabha constituency: Ghatkopar

Vidyavihar is a small suburb of Mumbai. It has a railway station with the same name on the Mumbai suburban railway on the Central Railway line. The area consists of mainly the Somaiya Vidyavihar campus.
