= Somaiya Vidyavihar University =

University in Mumbai, Maharashtra, India

- Motto: Sanskrit: ज्ञानादेव तु कैवल्यम्
- Motto in English: Knowledge Alone Liberates
- Type: Private university
- Established: 2019
- Accreditation: NAAC
- Affiliations: UGC
- Chancellor: Samir Somaiya
- Vice-Chancellor: Ajay Kapoor
- Students: 39,000+
- Location: Mumbai, Maharashtra, India; 19.0726°N 72.8978°E
- Campus: 60 acres (24 ha); Urban
- Website: www.somaiya.edu/en/

Somaiya Vidyavihar University is a private university located in the Vidyavihar suburb of Mumbai, India. Established in 2019, it offers undergraduate and postgraduate programs in various fields, including arts and humanities, science and technology, engineering, teacher education, research, management, commerce and business studies, sports, religion and culture, and entrepreneurship.

The university is recognized by the University Grants Commission (UGC) of India and accredited with an "A" grade by the National Assessment and Accreditation Council (NAAC). It is first self-financed private university in Mumbai.

== History ==
Somaiya Vidyavihar University was established in August 2019 under The Somaiya Vidyavihar University Act, Mumbai 2019. The State Government of Maharashtra had approved a proposal from the Somaiya Trusts to establish the university in February 2019. It is a self-financed university governed by Somaiya Vidyavihar, the K. J. Somaiya Trust, and The Somaiya Trust.

== Accreditation ==
Somaiya Vidyavihar University is recognized by the UGC and the Scientific and Industrial Research Organisation (SIRO). It is a member of the Association of Indian Universities (AIU).

The university's constituent colleges hold various accreditations from national and international bodies, including an "A" grade by the National Assessment and Accreditation Council (NAAC), All India Council for Technical Education (AICTE), AACSB International, the National Board of Accreditation (NBA) for Post Graduate Diploma in Management (PGDM) & Master of Management Studies (MMS) programs, and Bureau Veritas.

== Academics ==
The university provides undergraduate, postgraduate, and doctoral programmes such as B.A., B.Sc., B.Com., B.Tech., B.Pharm., B.Des., BBA, M.A., M.Sc., M.Com., M.Tech., M.Pharm., M.Des., MBA, MCA, and Ph.D. in various disciplines like Management, Engineering, Design, Teacher Education, Performing Arts, Music, Humanities, Business Studies, Sciences, Library and Information Science, Religion & Culture and Sports.

Somaiya Vidyavihar University primarily uses entrance exam, SVUET for admission to its courses. Since March 2023, the university has adopted the University Grants Commission's Common University Entrance Test (CUET) scores for many programs. Eligibility requirements vary by program and may include scores from CUET, national entrance exams specific to the field, and minimum academic qualifications.

== Schools ==
Following are the constituent schools under Somaiya Vidyavihar University:

1. K J Somaiya Institute of Management
2. K J Somaiya School of Engineering
3. K J Somaiya Institute of Dharma Studies
4. Somaiya School of Design
5. K J Somaiya School of Education
6. Somaiya School of Basic and Applied Sciences
7. Somaiya School of Humanities and Social Science
8. Dr. Shantilal K Somaiya School of Commerce and Business Studies
9. Department of Library and Information Science
10. Somaiya Sports Academy
11. Maya Somaiya School of Music and Performing Arts
12. Somaiya Institute for Research and Consultancy

The S K Somaiya College of the university was restructured into three schools in 2025; Dr. Shantilal K Somaiya School of Commerce and Business Studies, Somaiya School of Basic and Applied Sciences and Somaiya School of Humanities and Social Science.

== Rankings ==
University rankings

General – international
- QS (World) (2023): 151-175 (International Trade)

General – India
- Outlook India (Emerging Universities) (2022): 6

Engineering – India
- India Today (2022): 19
- Private colleges
- Outlook India (2022): 94

Business/Management – India
- NIRF (2023): 45
- Business Today (2022): 730.1

As per the 2024 Education World India Higher Education Rankings (EWHIER) survey, Somaiya Vidyavihar University was placed among the top 3 universities in Maharashtra and the top 15 private multidisciplinary universities nationwide. The K J Somaiya Institute of Management secured a 12th place ranking in the 2024 Outlook-ICARE India's Best B-School rankings.

In 2023, The Times of India's Engineering Institute survey ranked K. J. Somaiya College of Engineering, a constituent college of Somaiya Vidyavihar University, as #6 among the Top 70 Private Institutes for Placements, 3rd in the West Zone, 16th among the Top 125 Private Engineering Institutes, and 18th among the Top 170 Engineering Institutes. The K. J. Somaiya Institute of Management Studies and Research was ranked 45th in the Management category of the National Institutional Ranking Framework (NIRF) 2023.

The 2023 QS World University Rankings by Subject ranked Somaiya Vidyavihar University in the 151-175 band for International trade. In 2024, ten teachers from various faculties of the university were ranked among the world's best scientists in the AD Scientific Index.

Somaiya Vidyavihar University was ranked 6th among India's top 15 Emerging State Private Universities in 2022 by Outlook India's annual ICARE rankings.

== Events and activities ==
=== Maker Mela ===
The university hosts an annual three-day event called Maker Mela, a platform for showcasing grassroots innovations in India. Organized by the Research Innovation Incubation Design Laboratory Foundation (RiiDL) at the campus of Somaiya Vidyavihar University, Maker Mela brings together makers, innovators, and creators to exhibit their projects across various fields like arts, crafts, engineering, science, and agriculture. The event features maker booths, speaker sessions, and cultural programs, connecting makers, innovators, and industry experts. Maker Mela typically includes over 100 participants and is attended by thousands of visitors each year.

== See also ==
- List of higher education institutions in Maharashtra
- List of educational institutions in Mumbai
