= K. J. Somaiya Institute of Technology =

Indian educational institution

- Type: Private (Unaided)
- Established: 2001
- Academic affiliations: University of Mumbai, AICTE
- Principal: Mr. Vivek Sunnapwar
- Students: 360 (undergraduate)
- Location: Somaiya Ayurvihar Complex, Sion, Mumbai, India
- Website: kjsit.somaiya.edu.in/en

K. J. Somaiya Institute of Technology (KJSIT) (formerly K. J. Somaiya Institute of Engineering and Information Technology) was established by the Somaiya Trust in 2001 at the Ayurvihar campus, Sion, Mumbai, India. It is an autonomous institute affiliated to the University of Mumbai.

The institute was set up to impart education in the field of information technology and allied branches of engineering and technology.

The institute is approved by All India Council for Technical Education, New Delhi, DTE Mumbai; permanently affiliated to University of Mumbai; and accredited by Tata Consultancy Services and recently (2017) approved by the NAAC grade A college list and awarded the best engineering college in 2017-18 by ISTE Maharashtra and Goa. It has a huge campus (85 acres). In December 2018, KJSIEIT was accredited by NBA for UG programs for 3 years.

A satellite 'BeliefSat-0’, developed by the student satellite team of K J Somaiya Institute of Technology was launched on 1st January 2024 from the Satish Dhawan Space Centre in Sriharikota as part of ISRO’s PSLV-C58 mission. The Beliefsat-0 holds a significant role in commemorating 100 years of HAM radio in India and aims to replace the HAMSAT, which was decommissioned in 2016.

== Departments ==
The college's engineering departments are [1]:

- Department of Artificial Intelligence and Data Science
- Department of Computer Engineering
- Department of Electronics & Telecommunications Engineering
- Department of Information Technology

== Campus ==
The institute is located at Sion, Mumbai. It is part of the 85-acre Somaiya Ayurvihar campus, which also houses the K. J. Somaiya Hospital, Medical College, Cancer Research Centre, and K. J. Somaiya College of Physiotherapy. The campus grounds host open cricket and football matches. The campus has one volleyball court, three lawn tennis courts, one rink football, two half-size football grounds, one turf football ground, and an open gym. The campus is located off the Eastern Express Highway near Sion.

The college building is an eight-story structure and houses all the departments of the college, as well as a canteen, an auditorium, and separate girls' and boys' rooms, which have a table tennis table for leisure.

== Campus activities ==
- Software Development Cell which is actively involved in Research & Development and consultancy projects with industries and academic institutes.
- Research Innovation Incubation Design Lab Somaiya Vidyavihar, at Somaiya Campus focusses on technology and startup incubation.
- Affiliation to various professional bodies for Student chapters and Faculty chapters
  - The Institute of Electrical and Electronics Engineers is the world's largest professional association dedicated to advancing technological innovation and excellence for the benefit of humanity. It inspires a global community through IEEE's highly cited publications, conferences, technology standards, and professional and educational activities.
  - The Institute of Electronics and Telecommunication Engineers is one of the oldest technical bodies in India. It started in 2009 in KJSIEIT.
  - The students chapter of the Computer Society of India was formed in 2009. Technical and non-technical activities are held throughout the year. The annual technical festival Renaissance is organised jointly by the committee, along with many events through the year.
  - The Institution of Engineering and Technology is a professional society for the engineering and technology community, with more than 150000 members in 127 countries. It began in 2013.
  - Entrepreneurship Cell, beginning in March 2009, is an association managed and driven by students to promote entrepreneurship among students. It is associated with the National Entrepreneurship Network to interact with like-minded people. The Cell organises events like E-Week, Campus Company, Techno-preneur workshop and E-Movies.
- Active Training and Placement Cell

== Extra-curricular activities ==
Student enrichment activities through various student clubs and cells, including:

  - Robocon Cell
  - Cyber Security & Research Cell
  - IOT Cell
  - Programming Club
  - Hobby Club
  - Street Play Team
  - Marathi Bhasha Vangmay Mandal, etc.
- Interactive/Smart Board learning
- Open Gymnasium

== Rankings and achievements ==
- Conferred with Autonomous Status by University Grants Commissions' (UGC) Regulation.
- Recently Accredited with A Grade by National Assessment & Accreditation Council of India with CGPA of 3.21, in first cycle.
- Winner of Lander Mission Design Contest "Touch the Jovion Moon" conducted by LPSC ISRO as a part of Pearl Jubilee Celebrations.
- "Best Engineering College Principal Award 2017" by ISTE Maharashtra & Goa Section in 14thISTE Annual State Convention held at Bharti Vidyapeeth University COE, Pune on 17 February 2017.
- KJSIEIT was awarded as best engineering college 2017-18 by ISTE Maharashtra and Goa.
- AA+ by Careers360.
- KJSIEIT received "An Active Local Chapter Award" by National Programme on Technology Enhanced Learning.
- Institute has received all over India 3rd Rank in March 2018, 9th Rank in 2017 and 12th Rank in 2015 at National level Robocon Contest, India.
- NBA accreditation for UG programmes for 3 years.

== Placements ==
To provide appropriate career opportunities to the students, the Training and Placement Cell interacts continuously with different industries and training organisations. Workshops and seminars are organised for academic and overall development of the students.

== Alumni ==
KJSIEIT Alumni Association comprises students who have completed their final year of the four-year degree course. The Alumni Association is a platform for ex-students with the desire to make contributions to their Alma Mater. The association arranges alumni meets every year in February.
