= Sion, Mumbai =

Sion Sheev
- Neighborhood
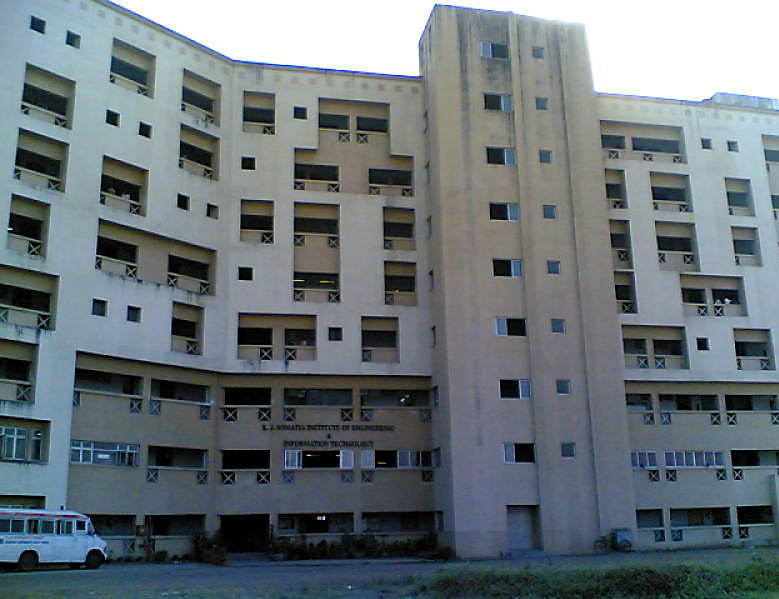
- K. J. Somaiya Institute of Engineering & Information Technology near Everard Nagar, Sion

- Location within Mumbai
- Coordinates: 19.04°N 72.86°E
- Country: India
- State: Maharashtra
- District: Mumbai City
- City: Mumbai

Government
  - Type: Municipal Corporation
  - Body: Brihanmumbai Municipal Corporation (BMC)

Languages
  - Official: Marathi
- Time zone: UTC+5:30 (IST)
- Postal code: 400022
- Area code: 022
- ISO 3166 code: IN-MH

Sion (/ˈsaːjən/; IAST: Śīv [ʃiːʋ]) is a neighbourhood of Mumbai, Maharashtra, India. In the 17th century the village formed the boundary between Mumbai and Salsette Island. One of the local historical places in Sion is a hilltop garden commonly known as Sion Fort or Sheevon Killa in the Marathi language.

== History ==
The name "Sion" is derived from the Marathi word "Sheev," which means boundary, as it marked the northern limits of Mumbai during the British colonial era. The area has evolved from a historic outpost into a densely populated urban locality, hosting diverse communities and cultural landmarks. In 1543, the Portuguese took possession of the largely uninhabited islands of Bombay, and gave it to Jesuits who built a chapel on the hill near the present railway station and named it Sião, after the biblical Mount Zion in Jerusalem.

== Education ==
Sion is also a home to many educational institutes, including:

- Ayurved College Sion
- K. J. Somaiya Institute Of Engineering & Information Technology
- SIES College of Commerce and Economics
- SIES College of Arts, Science, and Commerce
- Padmabhushan Vasantdada Patil Pratishthan's College of Engineering
- K. J. Somaiya Medical College & Research Centre.
- Lokmanya Tilak Municipal Medical College and General Hospital
- Our Lady Of Good Counsel High School

== Notable former residents ==
- Mithun Chakraborthy
- Sadhana
- Boney Kapoor
- Akshay Kumar
- Johnny Lever

== See also ==
- K. J. Somaiya Institute Of Engineering & Information Technology
