= Karamshi Jethabhai Somaiya =

Indian educationalist (1902–1999)

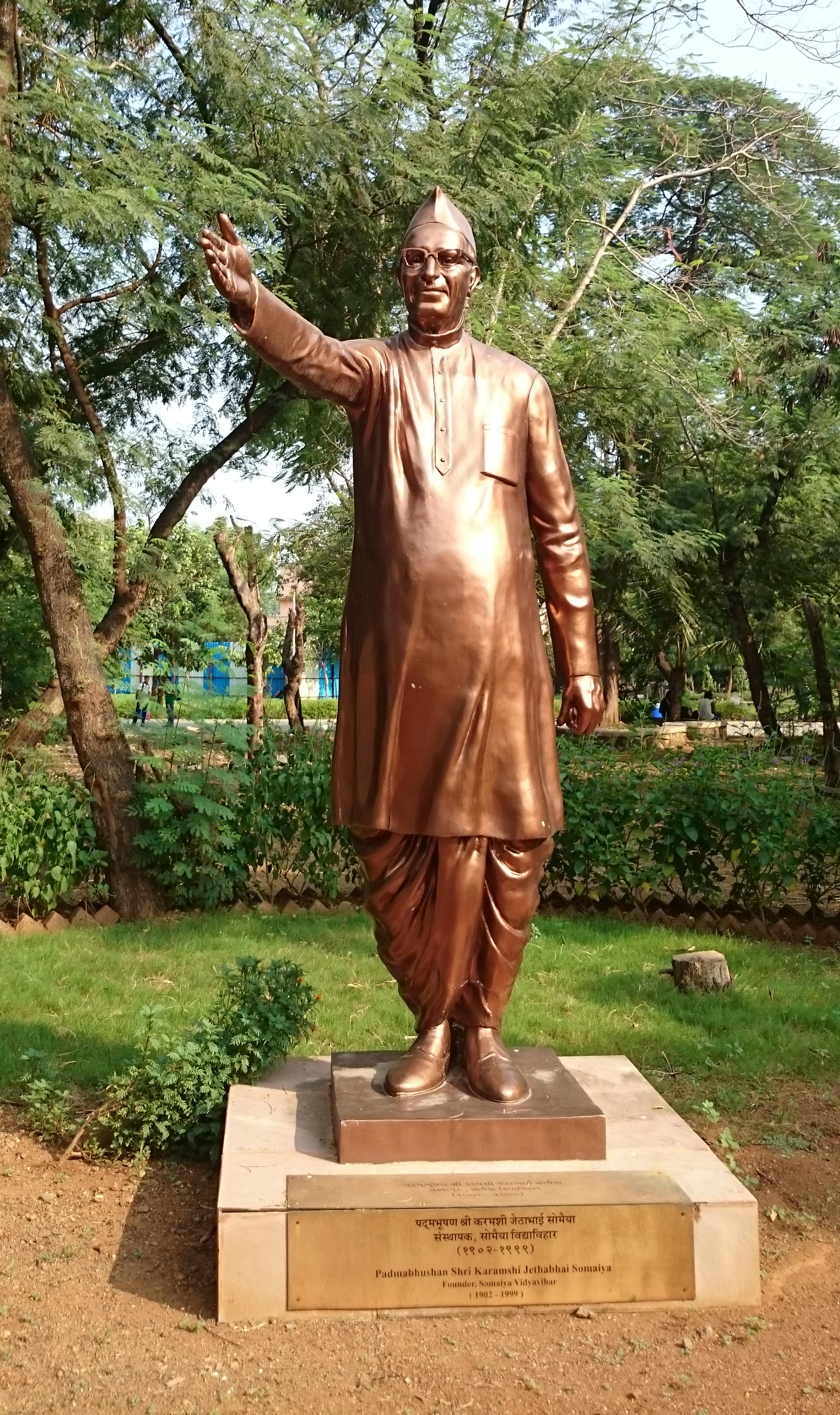
- Karamshi Somaiya's Statue at Somaiya Vidyavihar

Personal details
- Born: 16 May 1902 Remote village of Malunjar, Ahmednagar District, in Maharashtra, India.
- Died: 9 May 1999 (aged 96)
- Spouse: Sakarben Karamshi Somaiya
- Children: Shantilal Karamshi Somaiya
- Education: New High School in Mumbai (now Bharda New High School)
- Profession: Sugar industrialist
- Awards: Padma Bhushan (2000)

Karamshi Jethabhai Somaiya (16 May 1902 – 9 May 1999) was an Indian educationist who founded educational institutes in Maharashtra state in India. He was awarded the Padma Bhushan for his service to society in 2000. The Somaiya Vidyavihar educational campus in Mumbai and several colleges in this campus are named after him. He was also an industrialist and founder of Somaiya Group of industries.

== Early life and education ==
Karamshi Jethabhai Somaiya, born on 16 May 1902 in the remote village of Malunja in Shrirampur taluka of Ahmednagar district of Bombay Presidency, British India. Karamshi, after completing school at the New High School in Mumbai (now the Bharda New High School) went back to his hometown in Ahmednagar. Karamshi Somaiya engaged in looking after his father's small grocery business, would travel from village to village selling groceries and booking orders.

== Business career ==
In the 1939 Karamshi Jethabhai Somaiya launched 2 sugar factories – in Sakarwadi and in Lakshmiwadi to mark the launch of his own sugar business. He soon came to be known as the Sugar King of India. Karamshi became a partner in a leading sugar trading firm of Shobachand Ramnarayan Khatod of Shrirampur in Ahmednagar district. The Deccan canals were commissioned by the Government of India. He was the President of the Deccan Sugar Factories Association, the President of the Deccan Sugar Technologists Association.

== Works in education, medical, agriculture ==
Karamshi Jethabhai Somaiya bought a large area of land at Ghatkopar. Karamshibhai laid the foundation for Somaiya Vidyavihar in 1959. In close to four and a half decades it has grown into a large educational complex with 34 institutions catering to diverse fields of education such as Humanities, Engineering, Education, Medicine, Management and Mass Communication, with more than 23,000 students and 1,500 teaching faculty on a 65-acre campus. Karamshi Jethabhai Somaiya established the Girivanavasi Pragati Mandal in 1974 in the tribal area of Dahanu, in Thane District, 110 km from Mumbai. Mandal associated well known surgeons and physicians with the annual eye-cum-medical camps. The Mandal established a training centre and experimental farm for agriculture extension work. Karamshi founded a residential school to cater to the educational needs of children of the migrant
tribal population providing free quality instruction. He also built a 40-bed hospital with a resident doctor facility to cater to their health needs.
