= KidZania Koshien =

Family edutainment center amusement park

- Interactive map of KidZania Koshien
- Location: ららぽーと甲子園, 1-100 Kōshien Hachibancho, Nishinomiya, Hyōgo Prefecture, Japan
- Coordinates: 34°43′0.7″N 135°21′49.9″E
- Status: Operating
- Opened: March 27, 2009
- Owner: KidZania
- Operated by: KCJ Group Inc. KDDI
- General manager: Fumihiko Tajima
- Theme: Educational entertainment
- Slogan: "Get Ready for a Better World"
- Operating season: Year-round
- Attendance: 535,000 visitors
- Area: 6.999 square metres (75.34 sq ft)
- Website: Official website

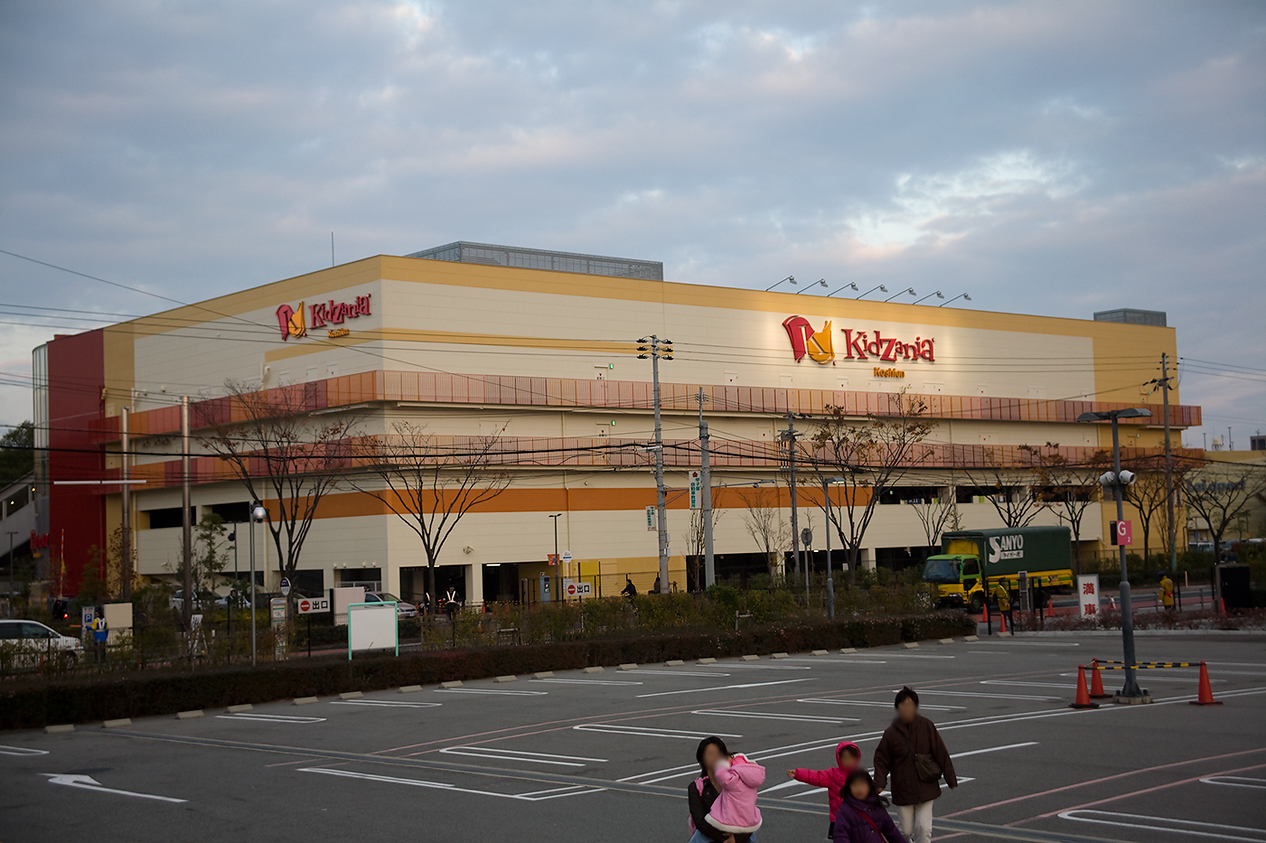
Exterior of KidZania Koshien

KidZania Koshien is a vocational experience-based theme park for children located within the LaLaport Koshien complex in Nishinomiya, Hyōgo Prefecture. It is operated by KCJ GROUP Inc. (formerly Kids City Japan).

== Overview ==
Plans for the second location in Japan were announced on October 4, 2007, with the site selected in Koshien, Nishinomiya City, Hyogo Prefecture. The facility opened on March 27, 2009.

- Operating days: Irregular holidays
- Operating hours (fully rotating shift system):

   ** Session 1: 9:00 – 15:00 (6 hours)
   ** Session 2: 16:00 – 21:00 (5 hours)

- Job experiences: Ages 3–15 (Adults may only accompany the children they brought and cannot participate in the job experiences themselves.)
- Parking fees: Parking in the "G" parking lot is free for six hours, and the special parking fee charged on days when baseball games are held at Hanshin Koshien Stadium is waived. Note: Do not insert your parking ticket into the "Special Parking Fee Zero System" validation machine.

Most of the corporate sponsors for the pavilions are the same as those at KidZania Tokyo. However, due to the nature of the businesses involved, companies based solely in the Kanto region are often replaced by companies based in the Kinki region.

The train pavilion was originally unique to KidZania Koshien, but a subway pavilion opened at KidZania Tokyo in April 2015. Similarly, the Horse Park pavilion was unique to KidZania Koshien, but a Horse Center pavilion opened at KidZania Tokyo in March 2025.

FM802, the operator of the radio station pavilion, maintains a partnership—through the Japan FM League (JFL)—with J-WAVE, which sponsors the radio station pavilion at KidZania Tokyo. Furthermore, TV Osaka—which operates the TV station facility within KidZania Koshien—shares an affiliation within the TXN network with TV Tokyo, the operator of the corresponding facility at KidZania Tokyo. (Note: While both FM802 and TV Osaka are licensed for broadcasting within Osaka Prefecture—technically placing Hyogo Prefecture outside their primary service area—their signals can be received by the majority of households in the city of Nishinomiya.) Additionally, joint campaigns between TV Osaka and KidZania Koshien were held in 2020 and 2021; these included voice-acting experience sessions featuring the series Tomica Bond Combination Earth Granner and Magica Party, both of which aired on the network. A prize campaign was also conducted, offering 1,000 randomly selected participants the chance to win premium merchandise (provided by Takara Tomy).

=== Differences ===
==== Pavilions different from the Tokyo location ====
- Sightseeing Bus - Shinki Bus (Closed August 31, 2021)
- Rice Milling Plant - Shinmei Holdings (Closed)
- Train - Hankyu Hanshin Holdings (Hanshin Electric Railway)
- Electric Power Company - Kansai Electric Power
- Department Store - Takashimaya
- Horse Park - Japan Racing Association

==== Pavilions exclusive to Koshien ====
- Farmers' Center - Yanmar
- Drugstore - Cocokara Fine
- Automobile Factory - Mitsubishi Motors
- Sushi Restaurant - SRS Holdings (formerly Sato Restaurant Systems)
- Embassy - JTB (Closed)
- Waterworks Facility - Taisei Kiko
- Painting Wall - Asahipen
- Boiler Facility - Miura Co., Ltd.
- Post-recording Studio - ECC
- Fashion Boutique - F.O. International
- Medical Research Institute - Rohto Pharmaceutical
- Barber/Beauty Salon - Kai Corporation
- Glass Factory - AGC
- PC Factory - Mouse Computer
- Kitchen Renovation Center - Takara Standard
- Packaging Lab - Dai Nippon Printing (Renovated from the former Printing Workshop pavilion in March 2023)
- Special-purpose Vehicle Design Company - Kyokuto Kaihatsu Kogyo

==== Pavilions that previously existed ====
- Hotel (1st generation) - Hankyu Hanshin Holdings (Hankyu Hanshin Hotels)
- Bottling Plant - Coca-Cola
- Home Appliance Repair - Midori Denka (currently Edion)
- Construction Site - Obayashi Corporation
- Eco-bag Shop - Toray (Closed July 15, 2016)
- Baumkuchen Shop - Juchheim (Closed October 21, 2017)
- Mayonnaise Factory - Kewpie (Closed; replaced by a PC factory)

== See also ==
- KidZania Tokyo
- KidZania

== External link ==
- KidZania Koshien
