= Tobu 50000 series =

Electric multiple unit train type

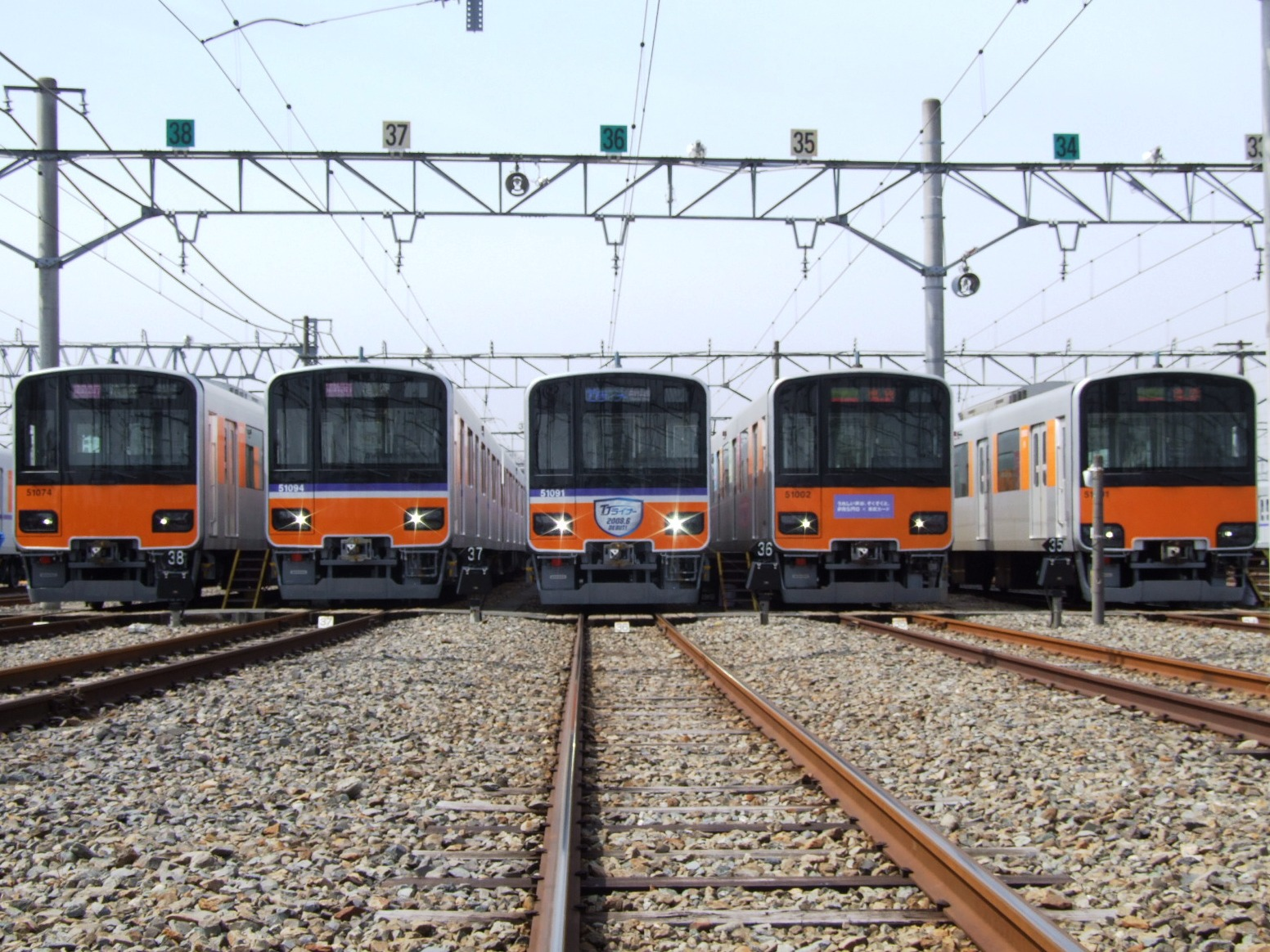
- A lineup of Tobu Tojo Line 50070/50090/50000 series trains in March 2008
- Manufacturer: Hitachi
- Built at: Kudamatsu, Yamaguchi Prefecture
- Family name: Hitachi A-train
- Constructed: 2004–2011
- Entered service: 16 March 2005
- Number built: 400 vehicles (40 sets)
- Number in service: 400 vehicles (40 sets)
- Formation: 10 cars per trainset
- Fleet numbers: 51001–09, 51051–68, 51071–77, 51091–96
- Operator: Tobu Railway
- Depots: Shinrinkoen (50000, 50070, 50090 series); Minami-Kurihashi (50000, 50050 series)
- Lines served: Tobu Tojo Line; Tobu Skytree Line; Tobu Isesaki Line; Tobu Nikko Line; Tokyo Metro Hanzomon Line; Tokyo Metro Yurakucho Line; Tokyo Metro Fukutoshin Line; Tokyu Den-en-toshi Line; Tokyu Toyoko Line; Minatomirai Line

Specifications
- Car body construction: Aluminium
- Car length: 20 m (65 ft 7 in)
- Width: 2.77 m (9 ft 1 in) (50050 series); 2.8 m (9 ft 2 in)(Other)
- Doors: 4 pairs per side
- Maximum speed: 105 km/h (65 mph) (Tobu Tojo Line); 100 km/h (62 mph) (Tobu tracks); 80 km/h (50 mph) (Tokyo Metro lines); 110 km/h (68 mph) (Tokyu lines)
- Traction system: IGBT–VVVF (Hitachi)
- Acceleration: 3.3 km/(h⋅s) (2.1 mph/s)
- Deceleration: 3.5 km/(h⋅s) (2.2 mph/s) (service); 4.5 km/(h⋅s) (2.8 mph/s) (emergency)
- Electric systems: 1,500 V DC Overhead lines
- Current collection: Pantograph
- Safety systems: Tobu ATS (50050 series), Tokyo Metro CS-ATC (50050 series and 50070 series), Tokyu CS-ATC (50050 series only), Tokyo Metro ATO (50070 series only), T-DATC (excluding 50050 series)
- Track gauge: 1,067 mm (3 ft 6 in)

The Tobu 50000 series (東武50000系, Tōbu 50000-kei) is a DC electric multiple unit (EMU) commuter train type operated by the private railway operator Tobu Railway in Japan since March 2005, manufactured by Hitachi to its "A-train" concept. The trains represent the first use of aluminium body cars on Tobu commuter trains. They are also the first Tobu trains to feature bilingual (Japanese and English) automated passenger announcements.

== Variants ==
- 50000 series: 9 x 10-car sets introduced from March 2005 on the Tobu Tojo Line and from September 2020 on the Tobu Skytree Line inter-running services
- 50050 series: 18 x 10-car sets introduced from March 2006 on Tobu Skytree Line inter-running services
- 50070 series: 7 x 10-car sets introduced from July 2007 on Tobu Tojo Line inter-running services
- 50090 series: 6 x 10-car sets with variable seat configurations introduced from June 2008 on Tobu Tojo Line TJ Liner services

== 50000 series ==
The first 50000 series set, 51001, was delivered in November 2004 and entered service on the Tobu Tojo Line on 16 March 2005, followed by second-batch set 51002 in October 2005. The second set differs in having an emergency door in the front ends, and externally resembles the 50050 series used on the Tobu Skytree Line (see below).

Two more sets, 51003 and 51004, were delivered during fiscal 2009. 51003 was delivered to Shinrinkōen Depot in January 2010, followed by 51004 in February 2010. These two sets have pairs of opening windows and interiors based on sets 51061 onward.

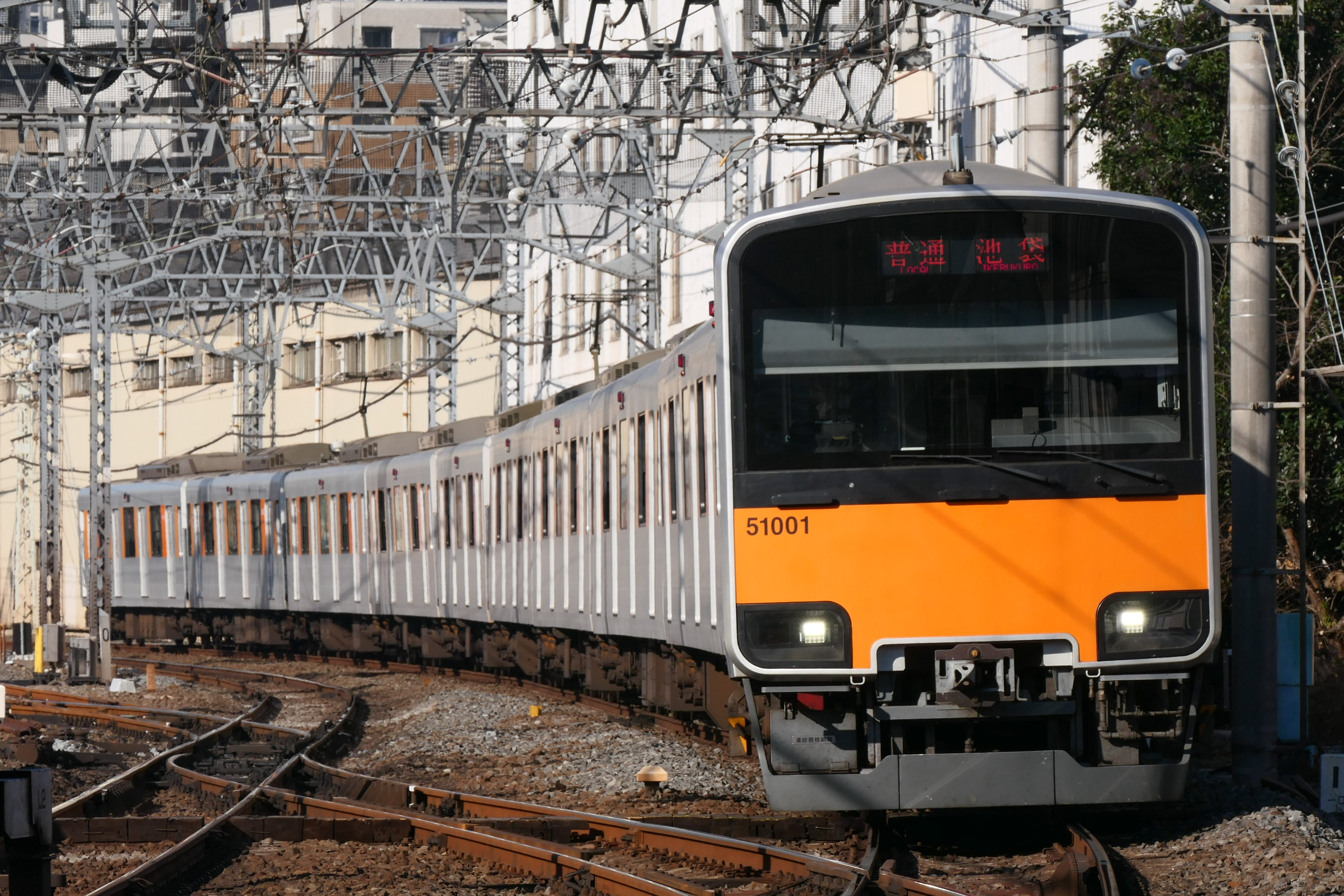
Set 51001 with no front-end doors in December 2019

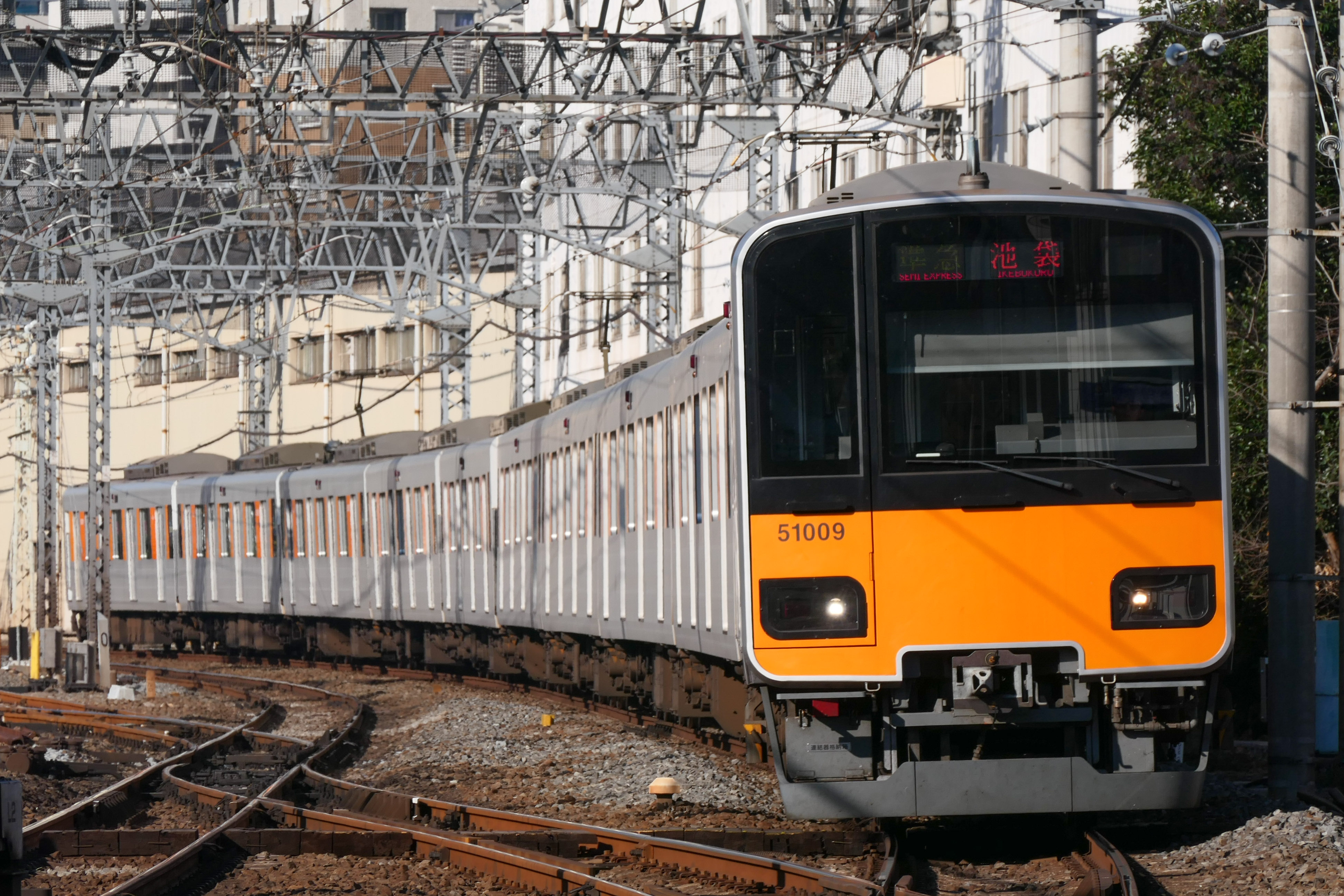
Set 51009 with modified side windows including opening sections in December 2019

Year built	Set numbers	External features	Internal features
2004	51001		
2005	51002	Emergency front end doors	
2009–2010	51003–51009	Pairs of windows instead of large single pane.	Redesigned seats with darker blue moquette. Conventional handrails next to doors.

Total number of vehicles built: 90

=== Formation ===
Car No.	10	9	8	7	6	5	4	3	2	1
Designation	Tc1	M1	M2	T1	M3	T2	T3	M1'	M2'	Tc2
Numbering	51000	52000	53000	54000	55000	56000	57000	58000	59000	50000

The 52000, 55000, and 58000 cars each have one single-arm pantograph.

=== Interior ===
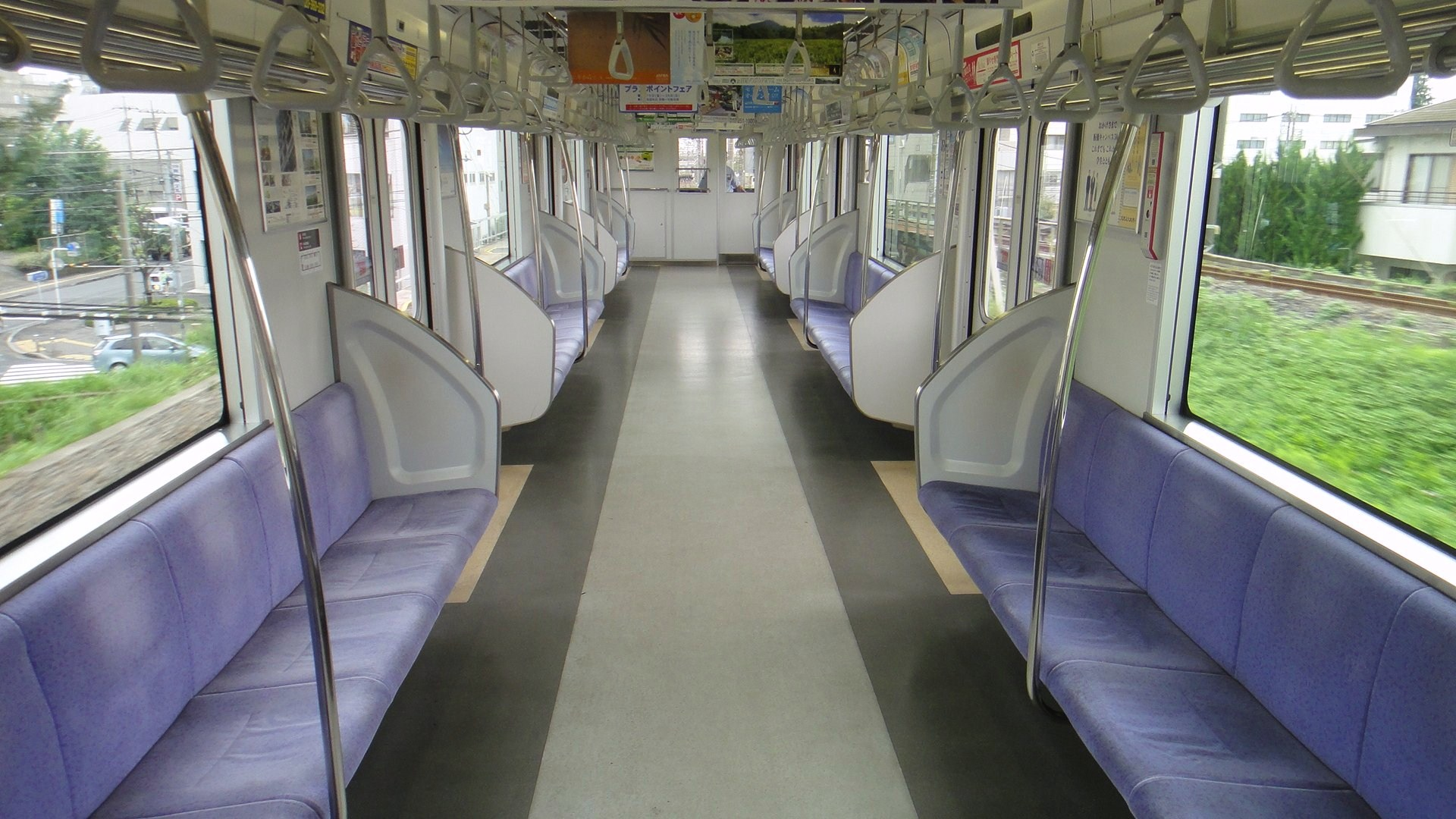
Interior view of set 51001 showing the original seat style in August 2011

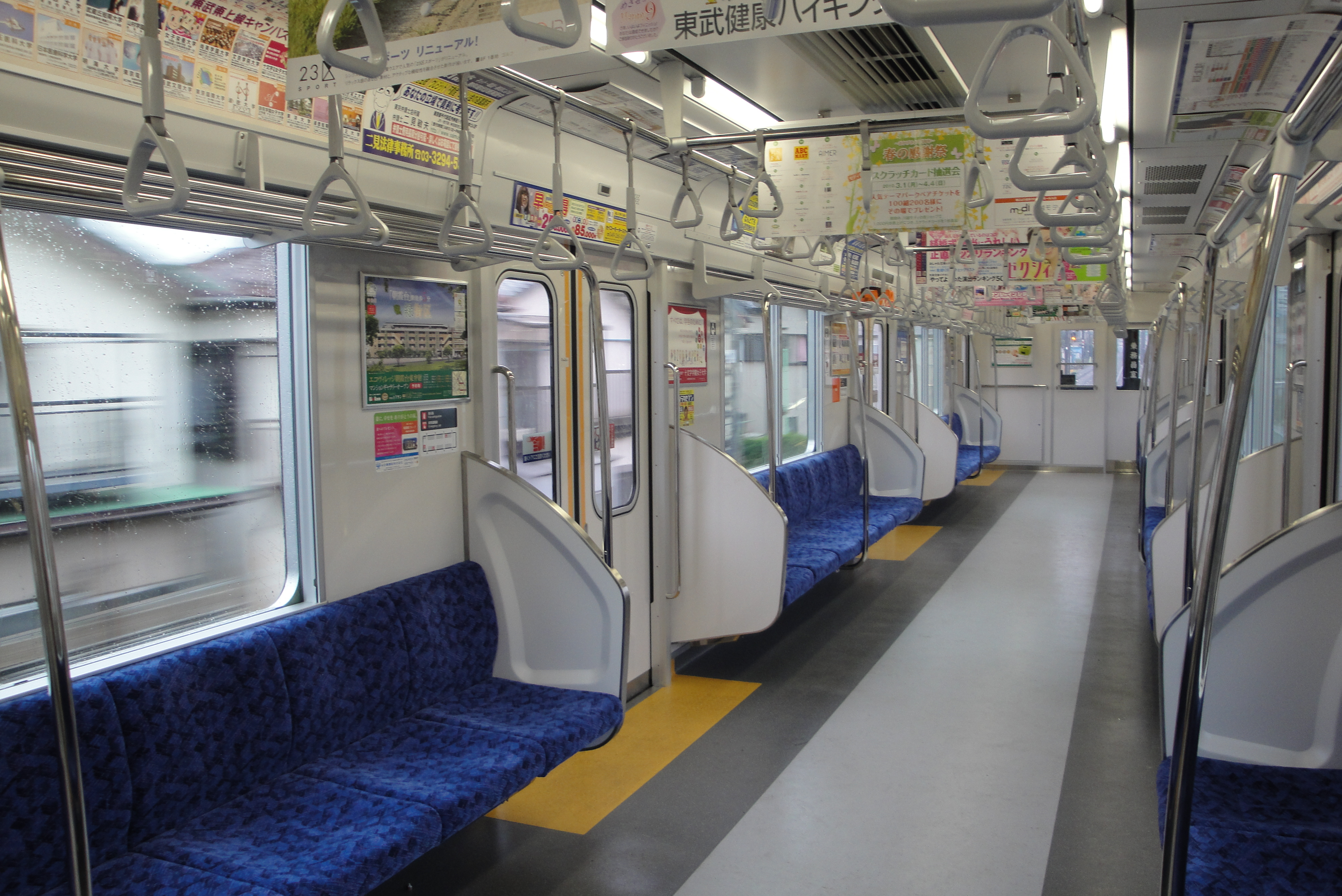
Interior view of set 51004 showing newer seat style and conventional handrails at the doorways in March 2010

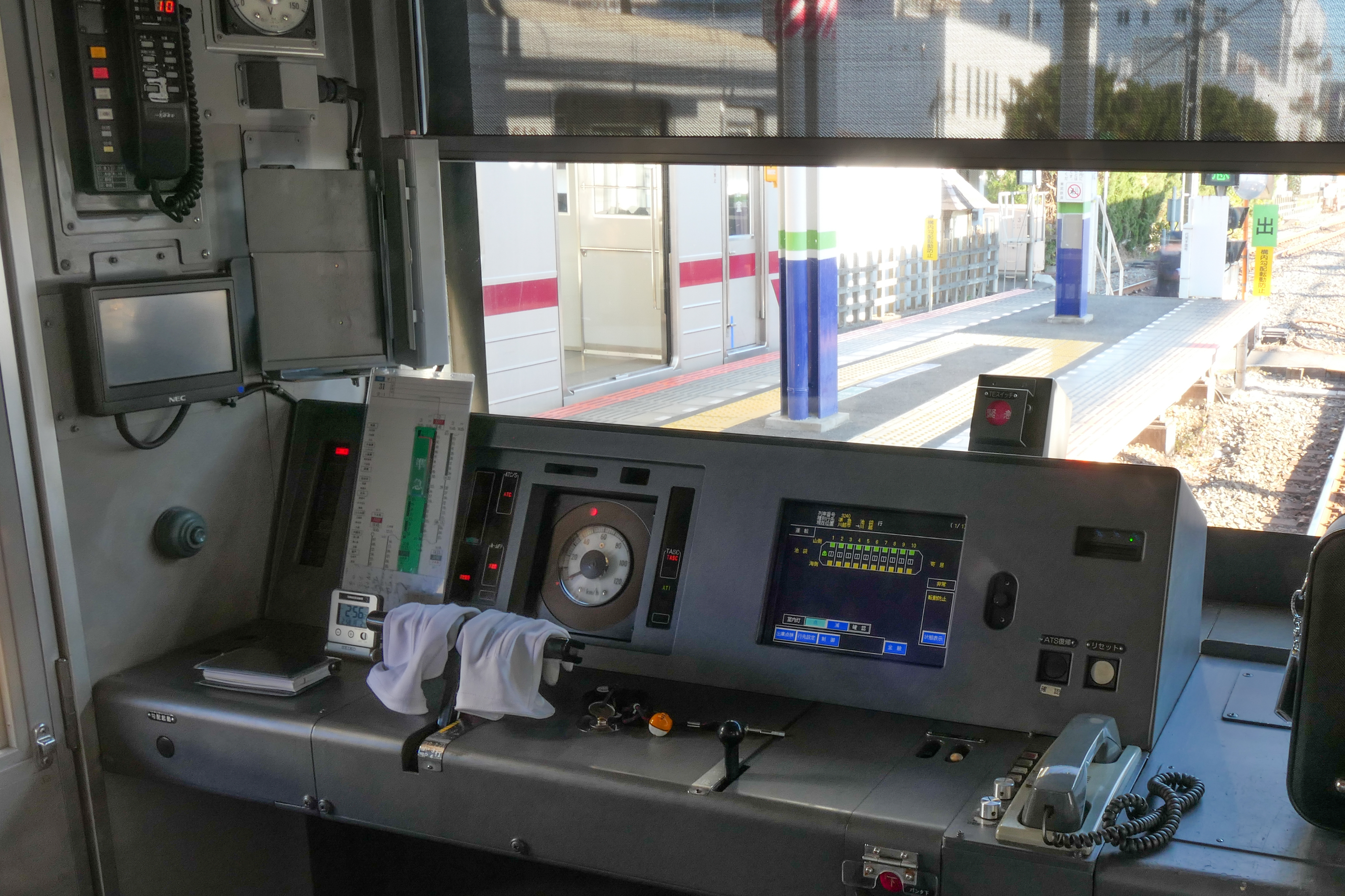
Driver's cab

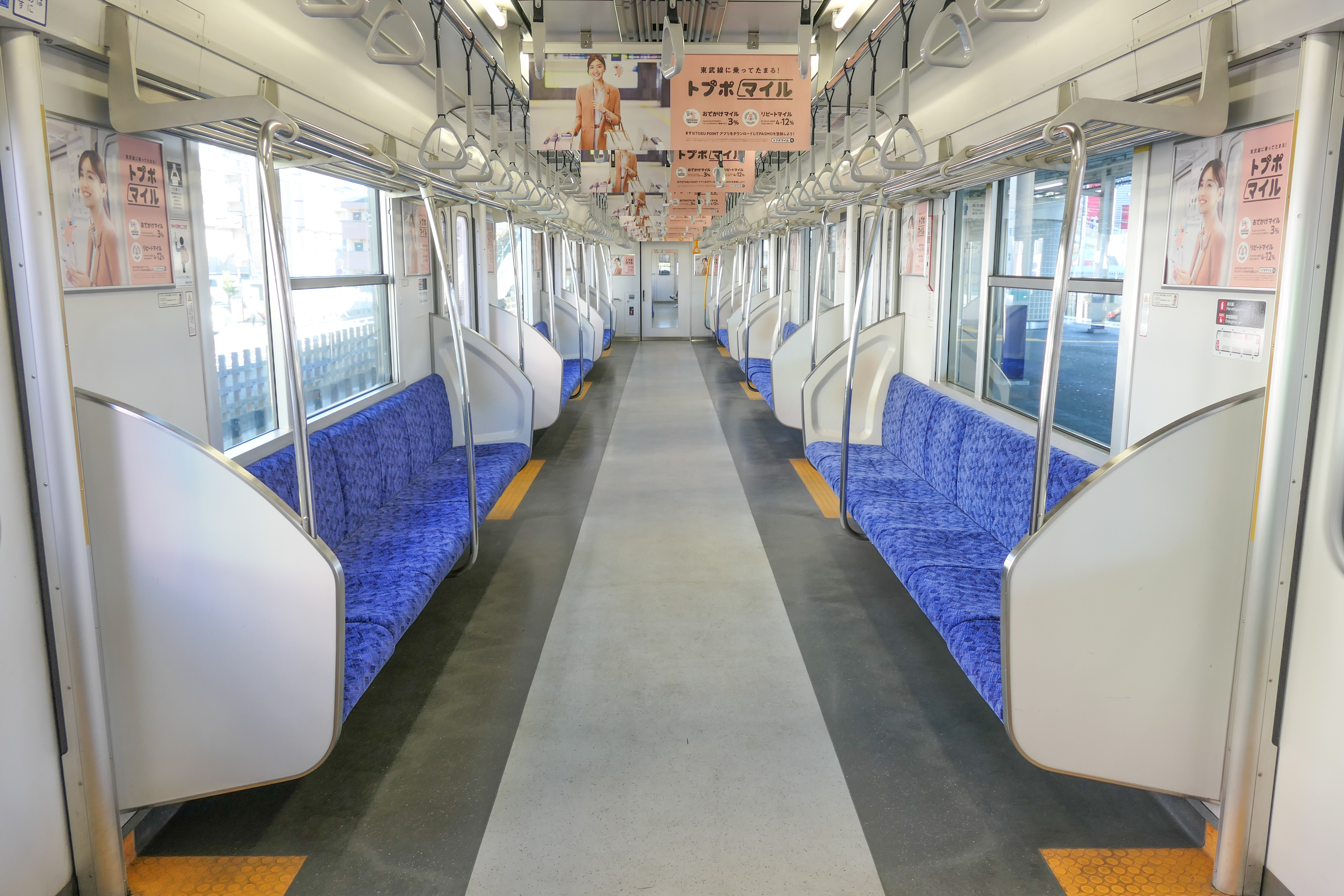
Interior view

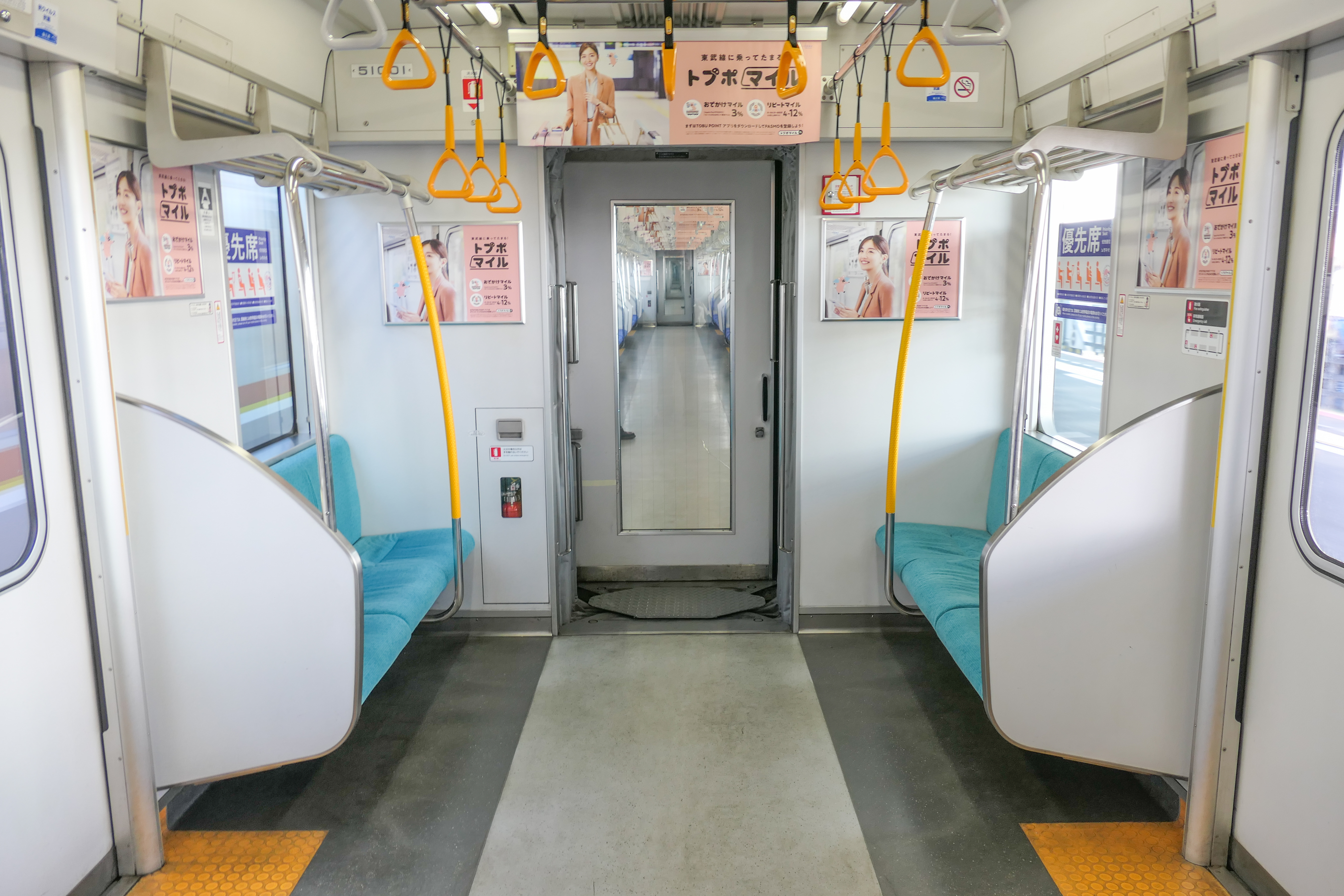
Priority seating

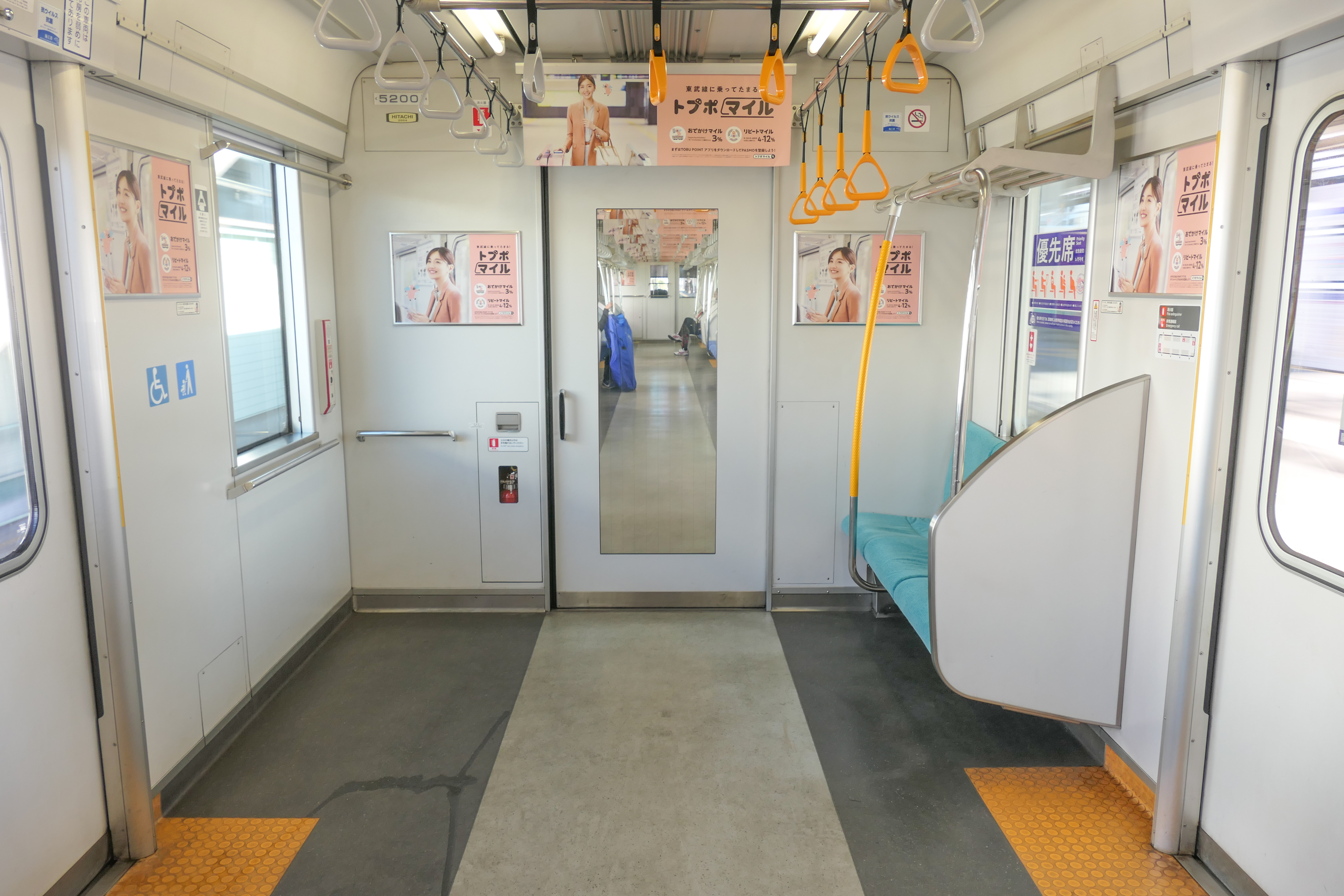
Wheelchair space

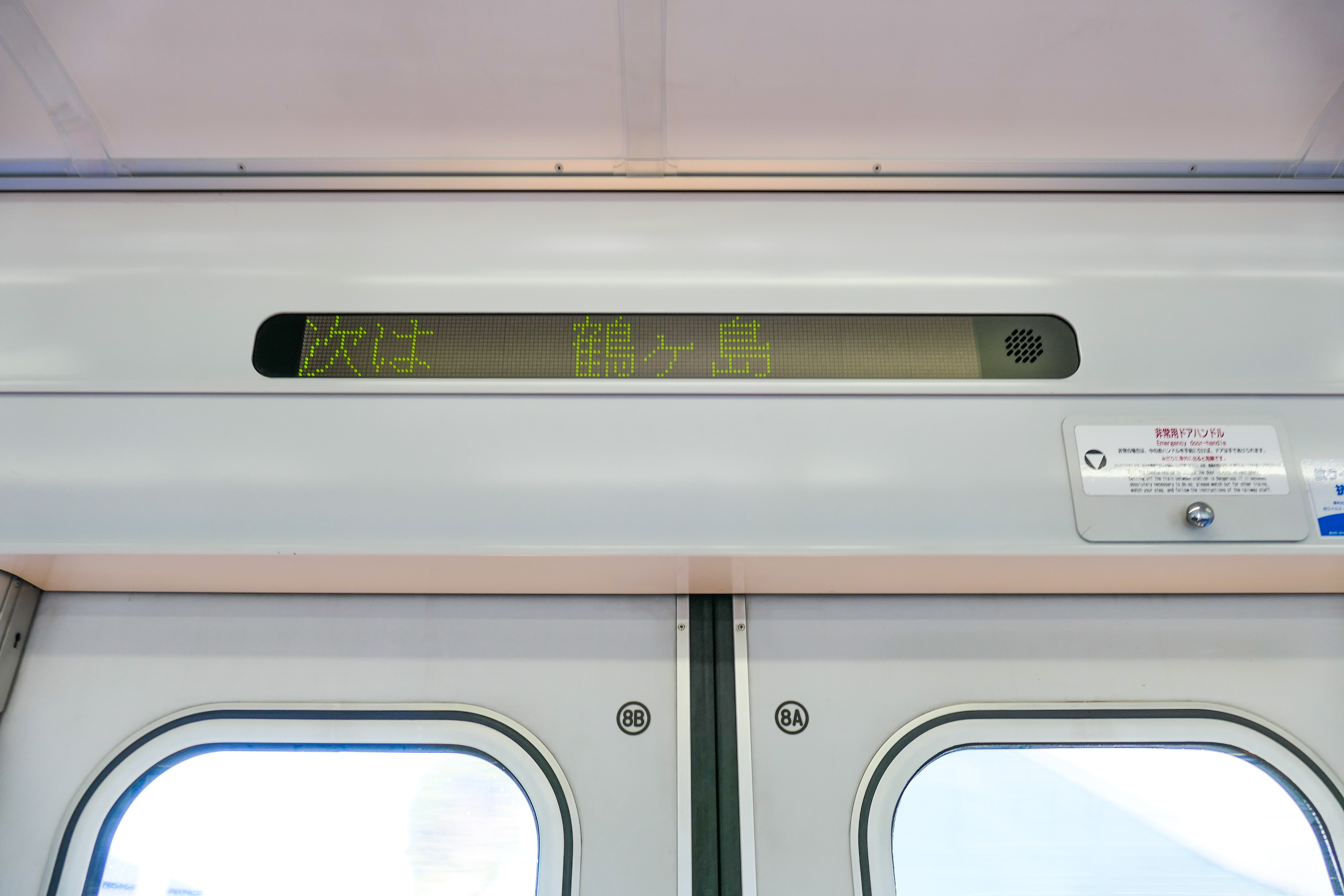
LED passenger information display

== 50050 series ==
The 10-car 50050 series sets were built for use on the Tobu Isesaki, Skytree and Nikko lines, and inter-running services through the Tokyo Metro Hanzomon Line to the Tokyu Den-en-toshi Line displacing the earlier 30000 series sets.

The first set (51051) entered service on 18 March 2006, and as of January 2007, 10 sets were in service. While broadly based on the Tojo Line 50000 series design with emergency end doors, cars are 30 mm (1.2 in) narrower (2,770 mm (9 ft 1 in) compared with 2,800 mm (9 ft 2 in)) to cope with reduced clearances on the subway lines.

Sets 51061 onward have different seat covers and pairs of opening windows (like the 50090 series) instead of the large single-pane sealed windows on earlier units.

Three more sets (51066 to 51068) were delivered during fiscal 2009.

From October 2012, set 51052 was modified with opening panes in four side windows per car, in the same style as Tojo Line set 51075 and JR East 209 series sets.

Year built	Set numbers	External features	Internal features
2006	51051–51060	Emergency end doors	
2007–2010	51061–51068	Pairs of windows instead of large single pane.	Redesigned seats with darker blue moquette. Conventional handrails next to doors.

Total number of vehicles built: 180

=== Formation ===
Designation	Tc1	M1	M2	T1	M3	T2	T3	M1'	M2'	Tc2
Numbering	51050	52050	53050	54050	55050	56050	57050	58050	59050	50050
Weight (t)	27.5	33.0	32.5	23.0	31.5	23.0		33.0	32.5	27.5
Capacity (total/seated)	137/48	152/51	151/54						152/51	137/48

The 52050, 55050, and 58050 cars each have one single-arm pantograph.

=== Interior ===
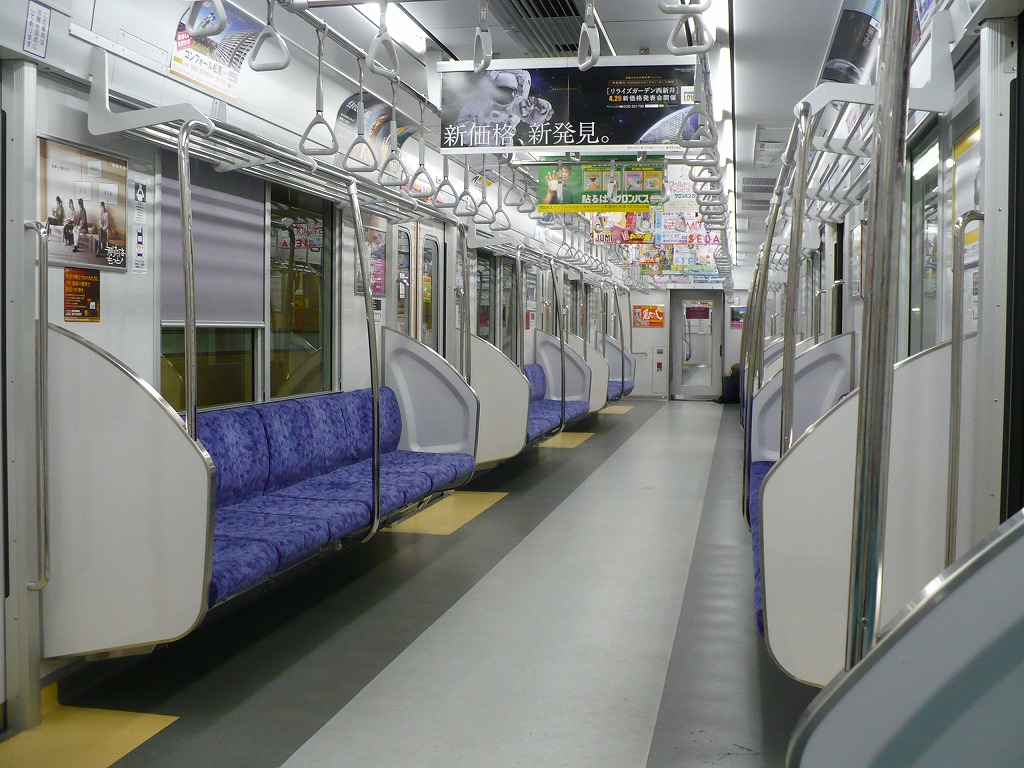
Interior of set 51061

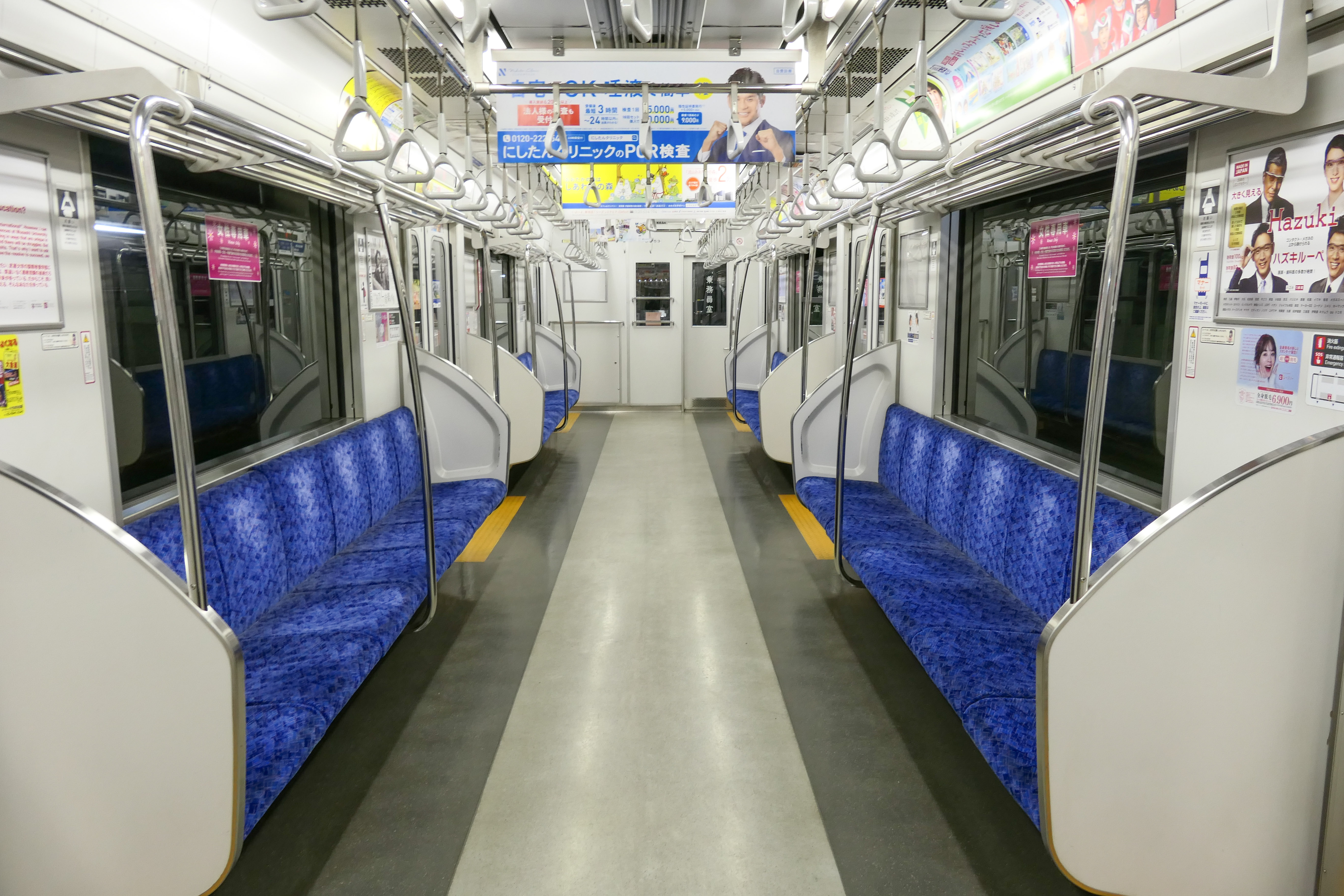
Early batch type interior

== 50070 series ==
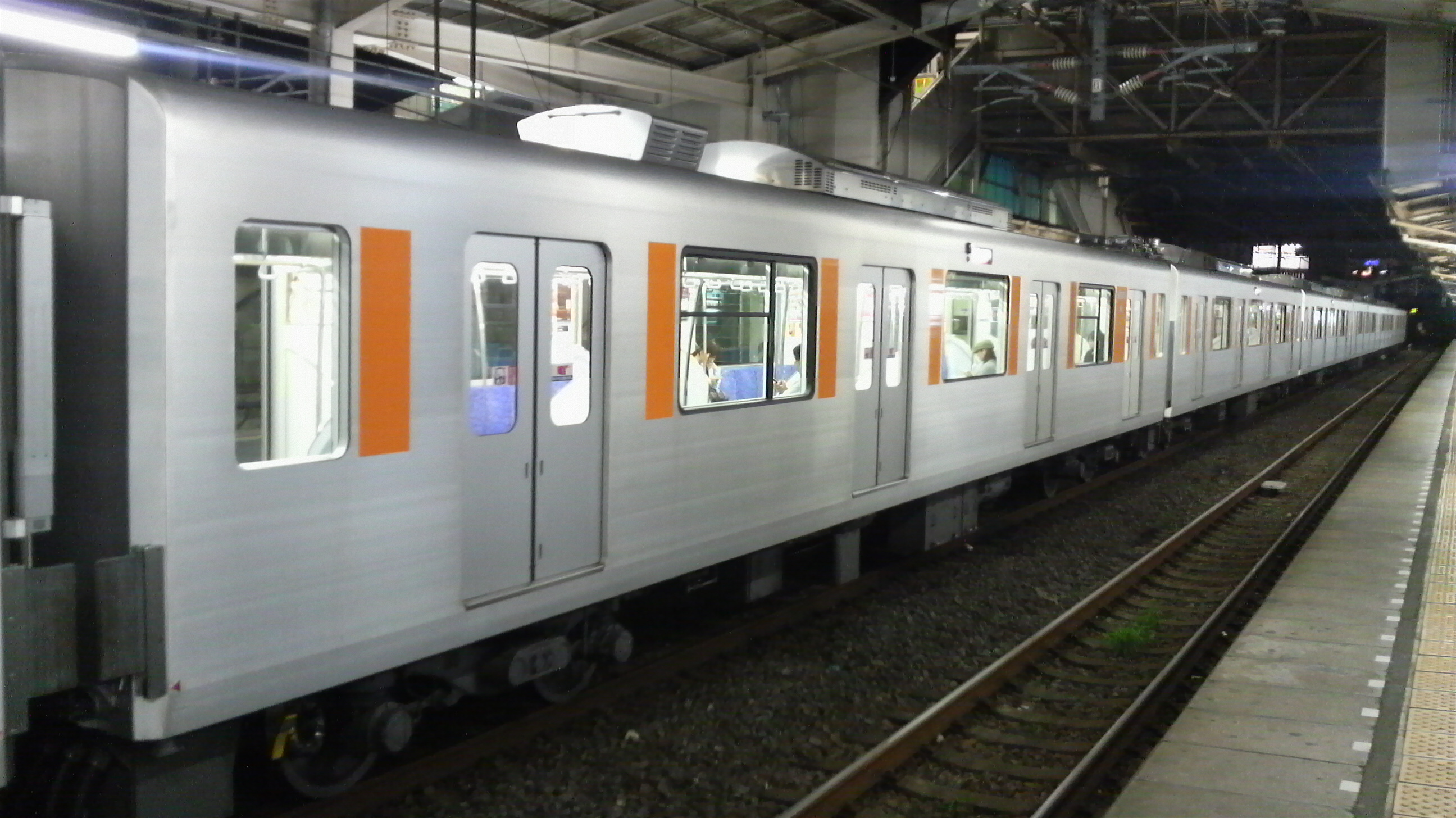
Set 51075, showing the opening side windows, October 2008

The 10-car 50070 series sets were built for use on Tobu Tojo Line and Tokyo Metro Yūrakuchō Line inter-running services, and also on Tokyo Metro Fukutoshin Line inter-running services from June 2008.

The first set (51071) was delivered in early March 2007, entering revenue-earning service in July. It differs from earlier variants in having full-colour LED destination indicators, and is also equipped with ATO for subway operation.

A total of four sets were delivered by March 2008.

A fifth set, 51075, was delivered in August 2008. This set differs in having opening windows similar in design to those added to JR East 209 series EMUs.

A further two sets, 51076 and 51077, were delivered during fiscal 2011, with 51076 delivered in November 2011, and 51077 in January 2012. These sets differ in having 17" LCD displays above every door, instead of the LED dot-matrix displays used on earlier sets, and also have pairs of opening side windows instead of the large single panes.

Year built	Set numbers	External features	Internal features
2008	51071–51074	Full-colour LED destination indicators	
2008	51075	Opening sections included in windows.	
2011	51076–51077	Pairs of windows instead of large single pane.	17" LCD displays above doors.

Total number of vehicles built: 70

=== Formation ===
Car No.	10	9	8	7	6	5	4	3	2	1
Designation	Tc1	M1	M2	T1	M3	T2	T3	M1'	M2'	Tc2
Numbering	51070	52070	53070	54070	55070	56070	57070	58070	59070	50070
Capacity (total/seated)	140/48	154/51	153/54						154/51	140/48

The 52070, 55070, and 58070 cars each have one single-arm pantograph.

=== Interior ===
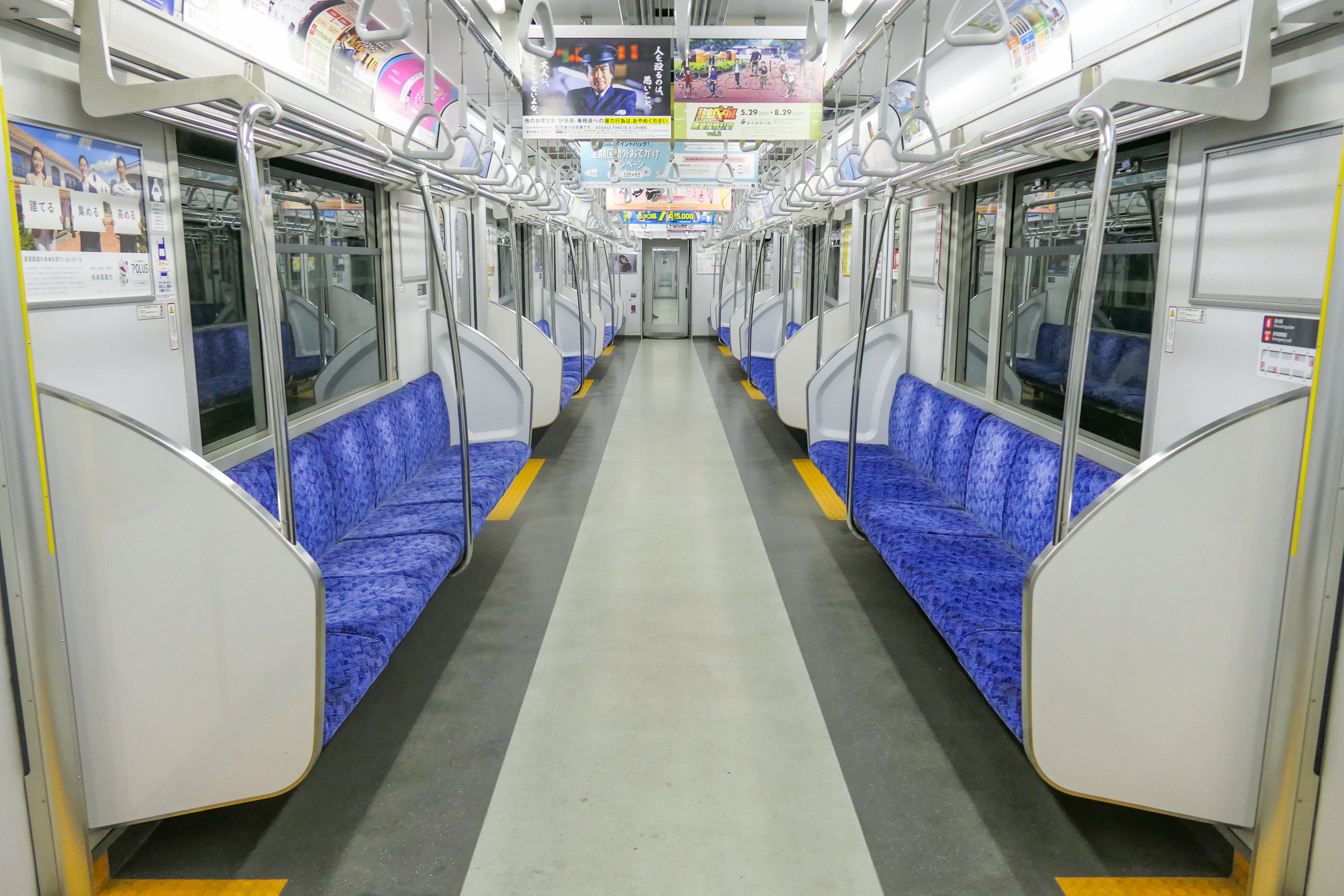
Interior view

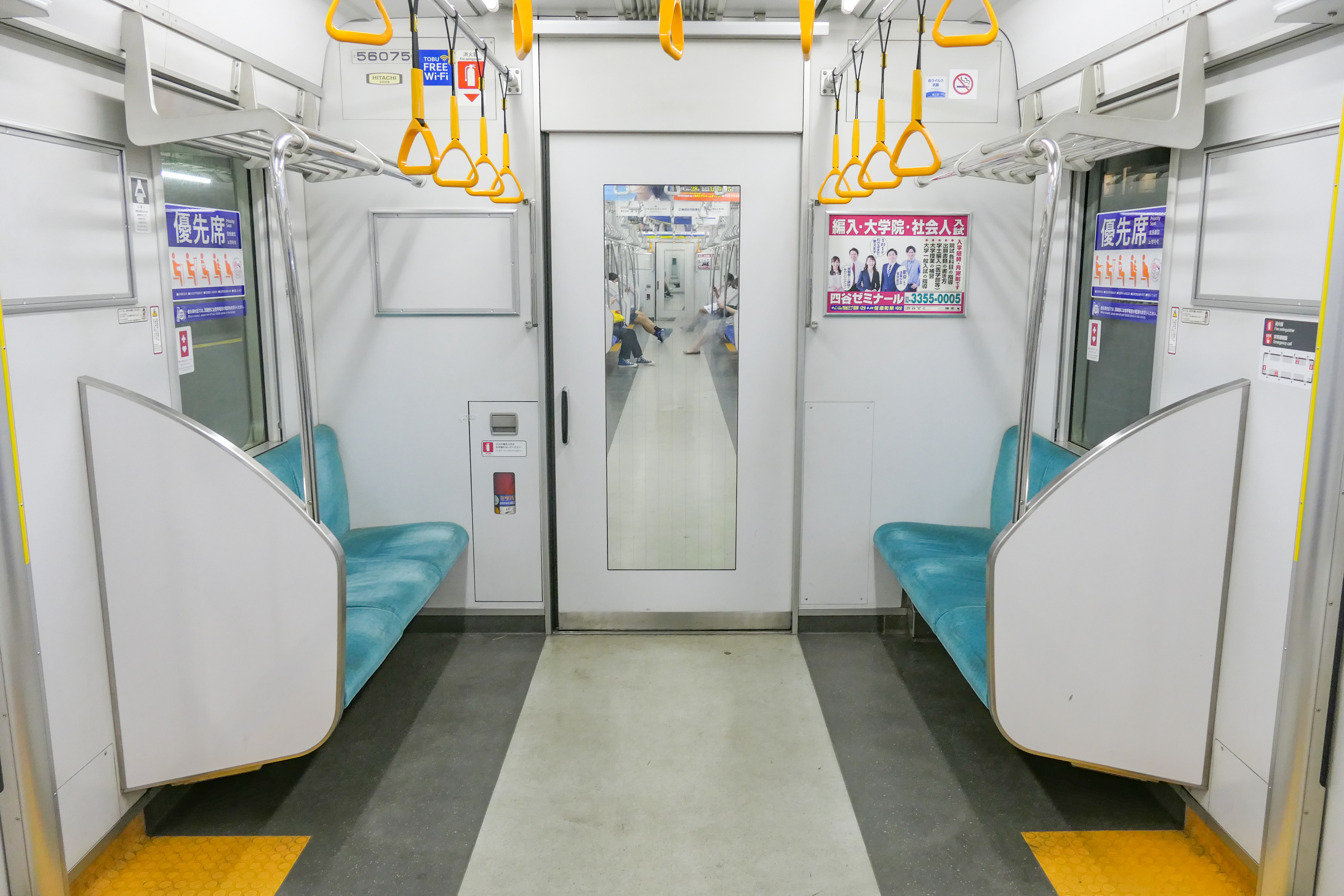
Priority seats

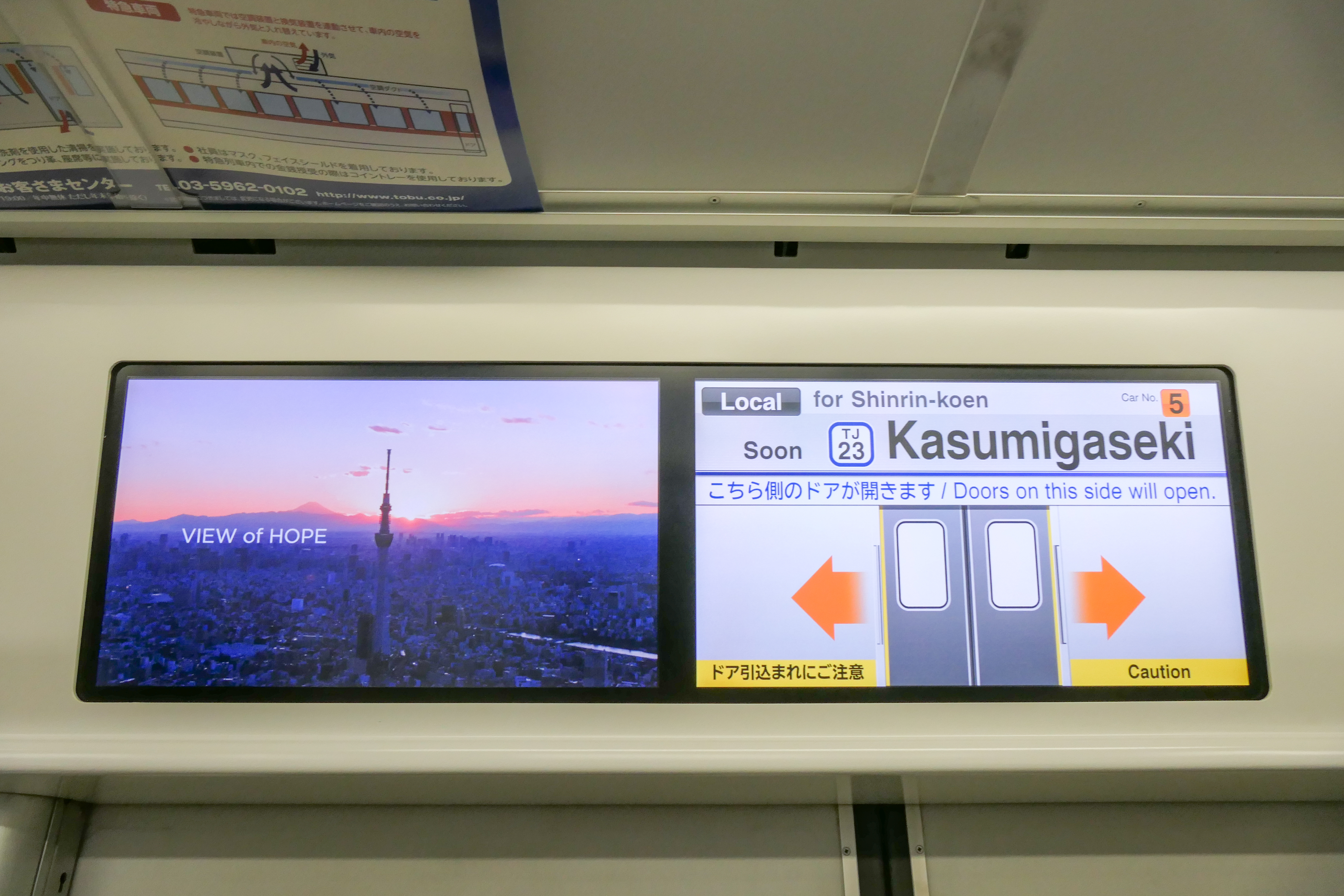
LCD passenger information display

== 50090 series ==
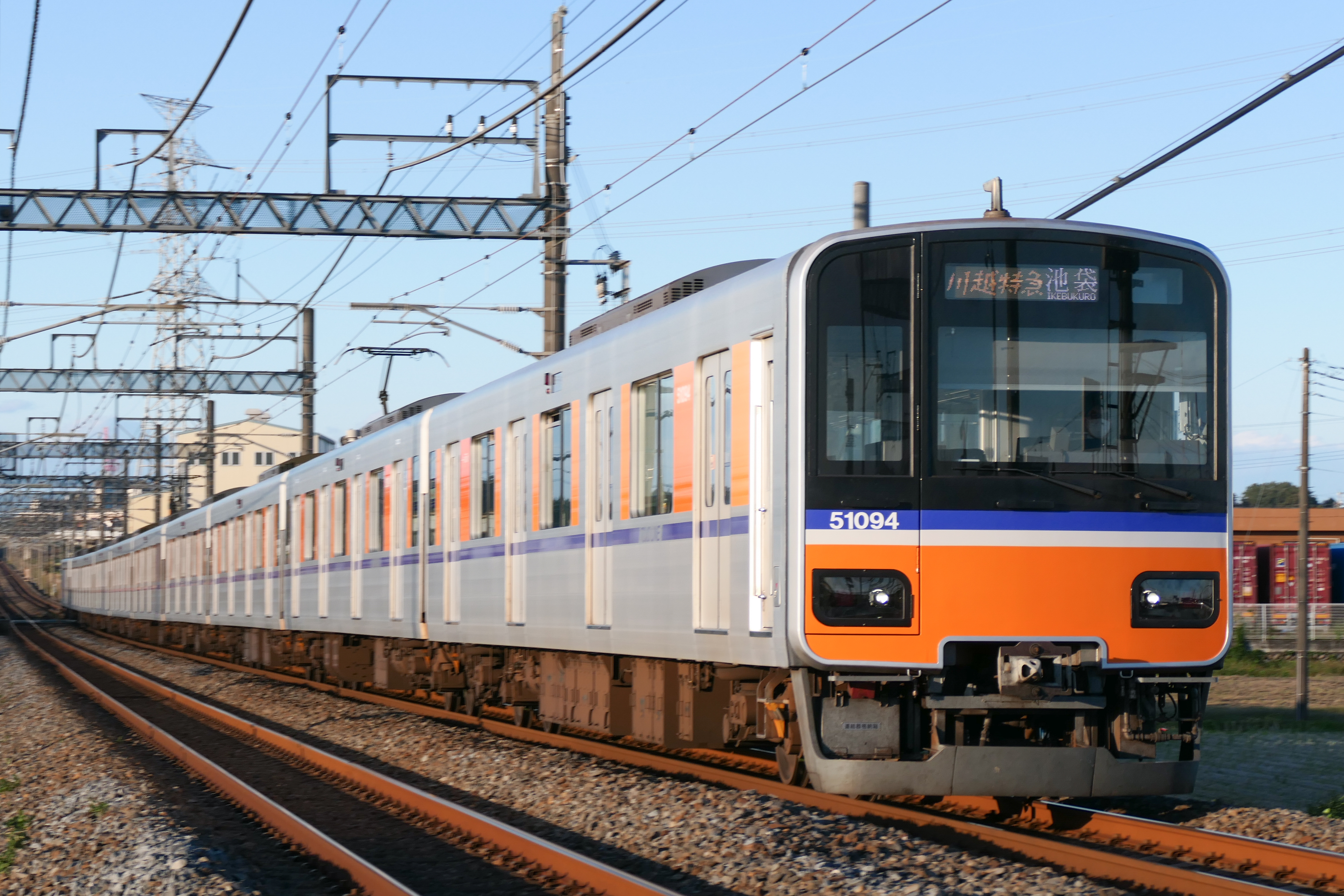
50090 series set 51094 in October 2021

Four 10-car 50090 sets were delivered in February and March 2008 for use on new Tobu Tojo Line limited-stop evening TJ Liner services starting from the start of the new timetable on 14 June 2008. Internally, these trains feature rotating seats that can be arranged longitudinally for daytime services and in forward-facing transverse pairs for "Liner" services. These trains are also used on up "Rapid Express" services in the late afternoon and night as well as the newly introduced Kawagoe Limited Express services from 16 March 2019. Externally, the sets feature a blue waistline stripe running the length of each car, with a "TOJO LINE" logo.

A public preview run of the 50090 series took place on 23 March 2008 from Ikebukuro to Shinrinkōen station, followed by a photographic event at Shinrinkōen depot.

A fifth set, 51095, was delivered from Hitachi in September 2010, followed by 51096 in November 2010, in preparation for an increase in the number of TJ Liner services from the start of the revised timetable on 5 March 2011.

Year built	Set numbers	External features	Internal features
2008	51091–51094	Pairs of windows. Full-colour LED destination indicators.	Rotating seat pairs
2010	51095–51096		Conventional handrails next to doors.

Total number of vehicles built: 60

=== Formation ===
Car No.	10	9	8	7	6	5	4	3	2	1
Designation	Tc1	M1	M2	T1	M3	T2	T3	M1'	M2'	Tc2
Numbering	51090	52090	53090	54090	55090	56090	57090	58090	59090	50090
Weight (t)	28.2	33.9	33.4	25.5	32.3	25.5		33.9	33.4	28.2
Capacity (total/seated) longitudinal config.	124/42	136/45	135/48						136/45	124/42
Capacity (total/seated) transverse config.	118/42	131/45	129/48						131/45	118/42

The 52090, 55090, and 58090 cars each have one single-arm pantograph.

=== Interior ===
The 50090 series sets have seats that can be rotated and configured in longitudinal style for regular daytime services or in forward-facing transverse style for TJ Liner services and late afternoon/evening Ikebukuro-bound Rapid Express services. When configured in transverse mode, the rows have a seat pitch of 1,000 mm (39 in).

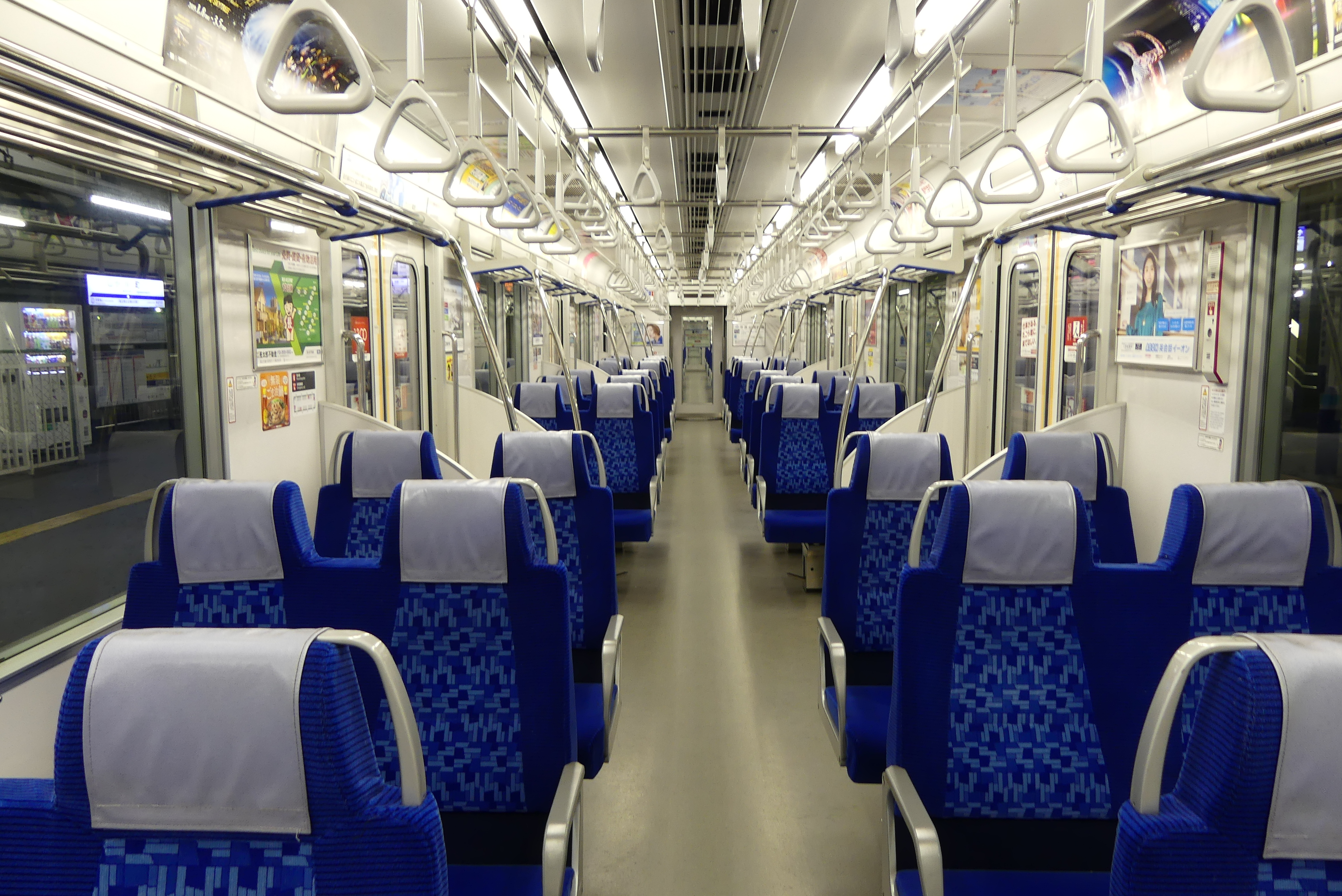
Interior view of a 50090 series in forward-facing transverse configuration

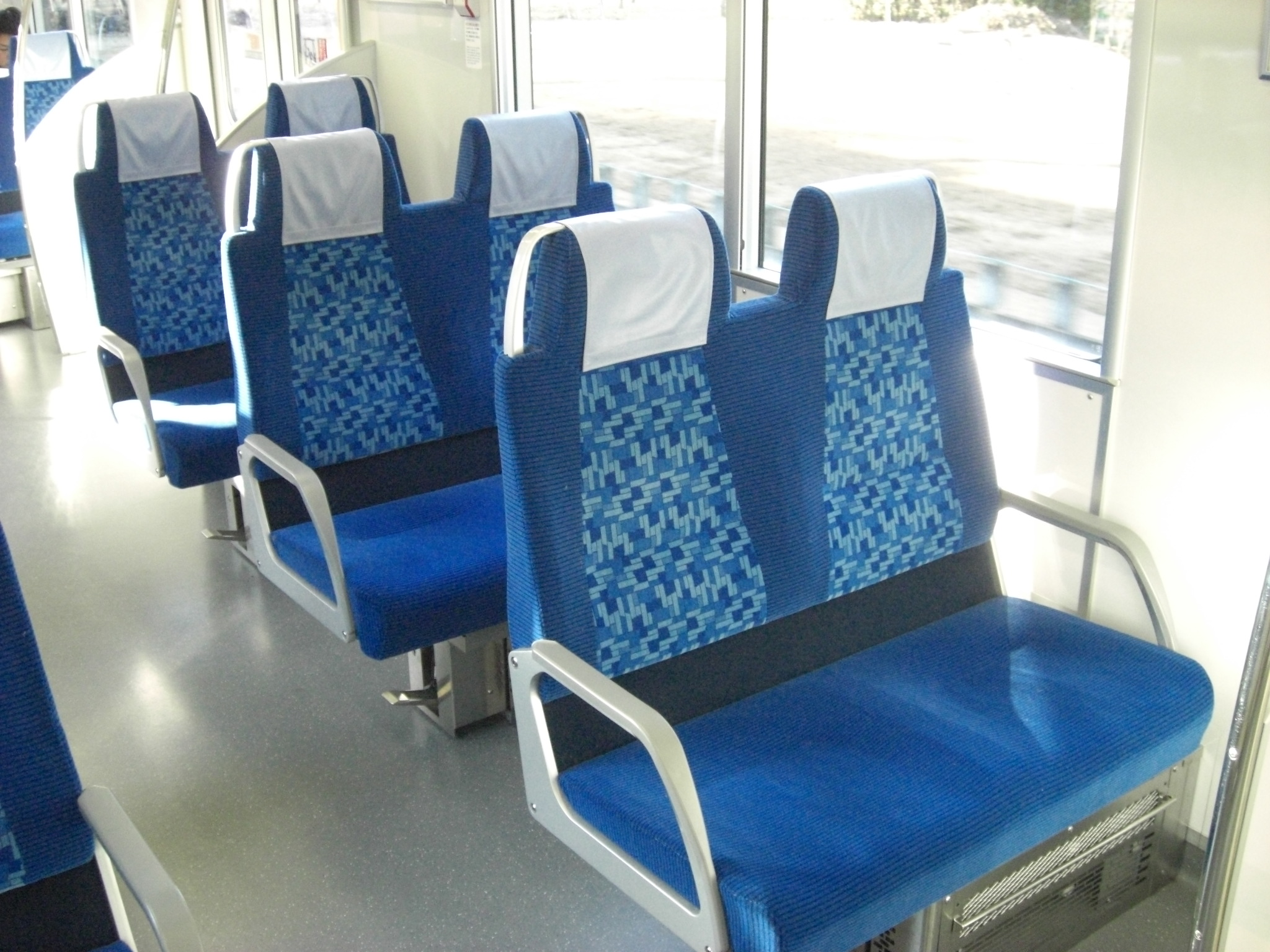
Seats of 50090 series in transverse configuration

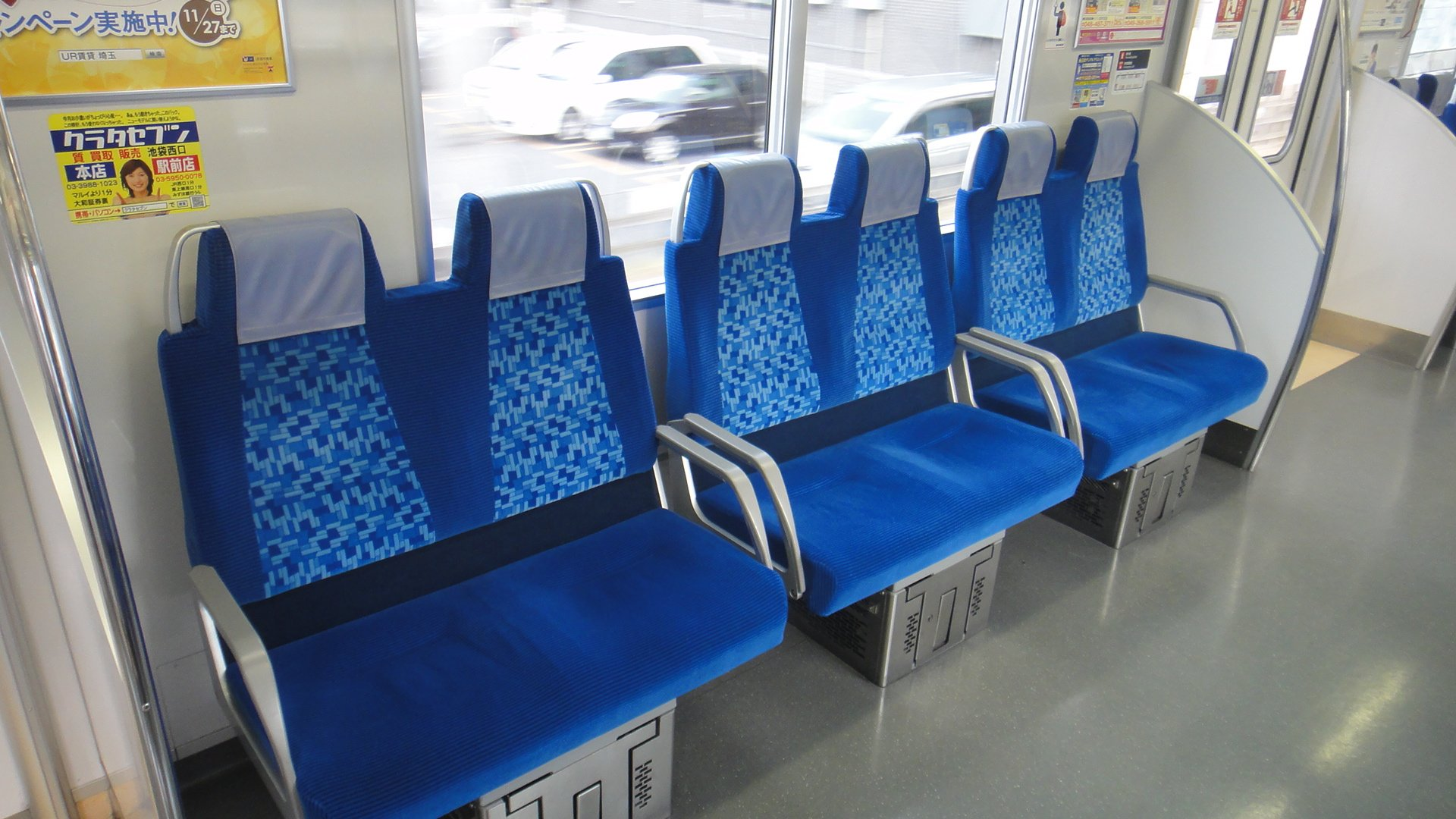
Seats of 50090 series in longitudinal configuration

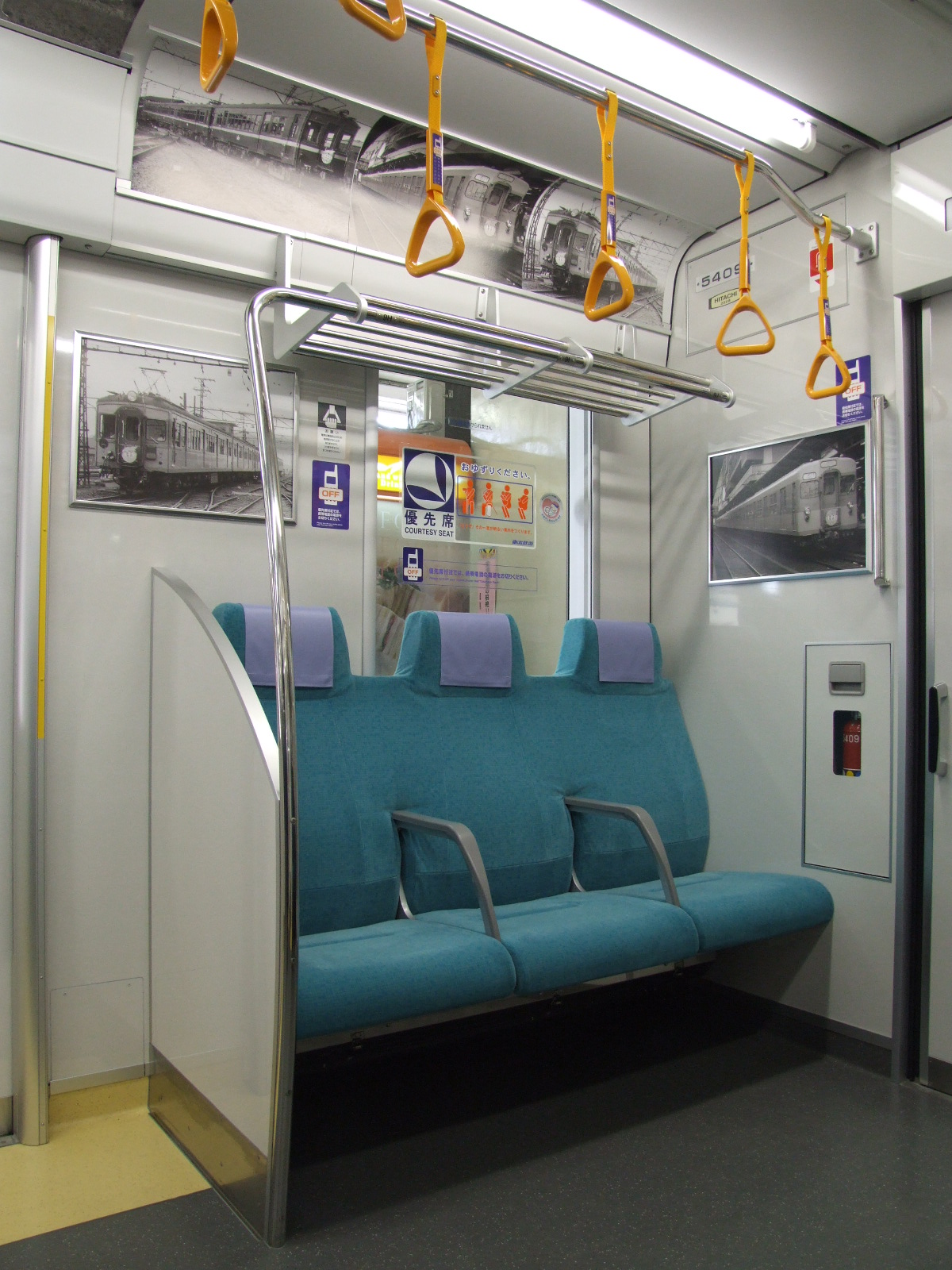
Priority seats with armrests

== Special liveries ==
=== "Flying Tojo" livery ===
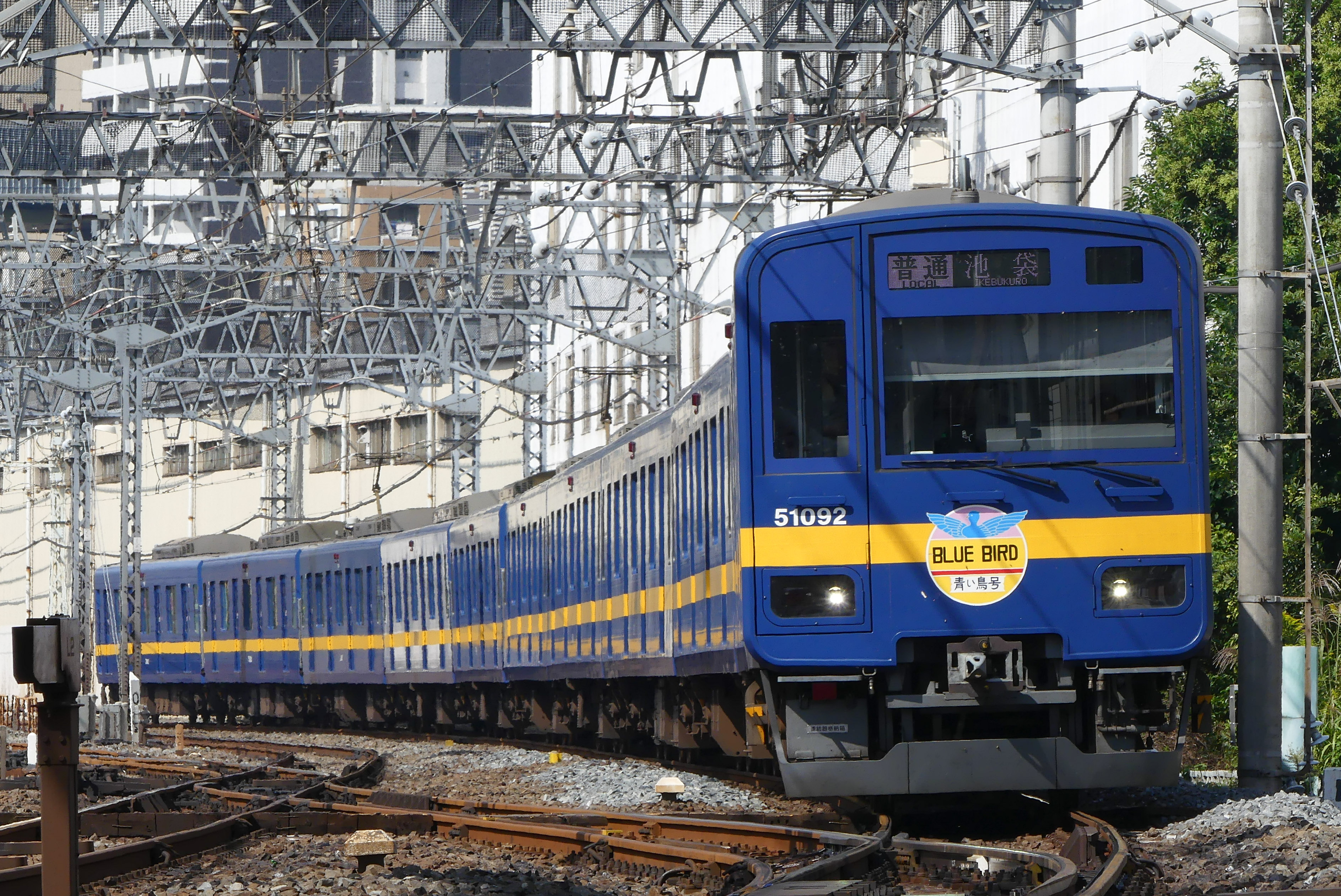
Set 51092 in commemorative "Flying Tojo" livery in October 2017

From 28 November 2015, 50090 series set 51092, based at Shinrinkoen Depot, received full-body vinyls recreating the dark blue with yellow stripe livery carried by 54 series and 53 series EMUs used on Flying Tojo limited express services on the Tobu Tojo Line during the 1950s. The livery was commemorated with a special run on 2 February 2019, removed soon afterwards, and replaced with the "Ikebukuro - Kawagoe Art Train" livery.

=== "Ikebukuro - Kawagoe Art Train" livery ===
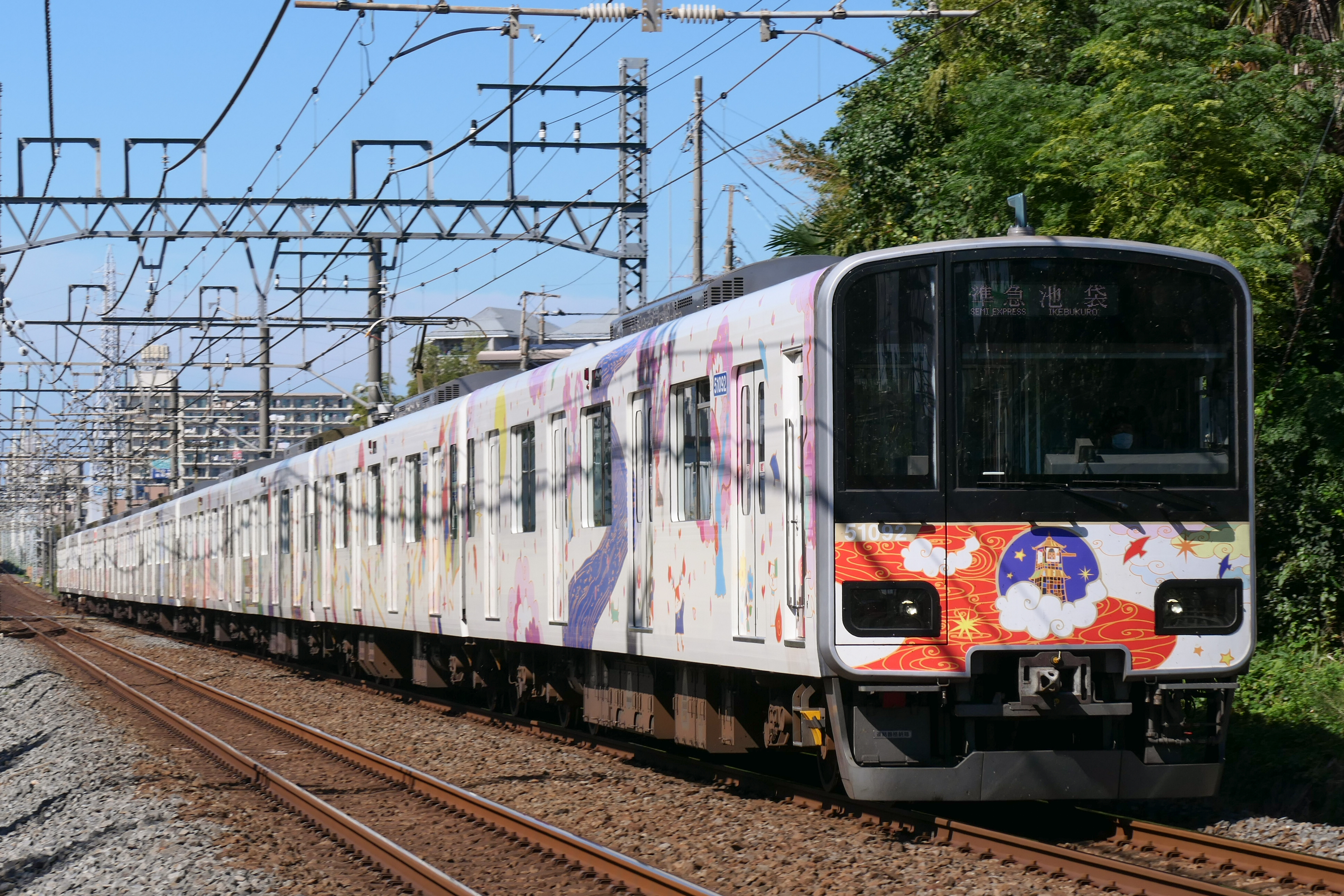
Set 51092 in "Ikebukuro - Kawagoe Art Train" livery in October 2021

Ahead of the 16 March 2019 timetable revision on the Tobu Tojo Line, 50090 series set 51092 was repainted from its previous "Flying Tojo" into a new art-based livery. The livery, designed by Koyano Yuuki, is designed to advertise the city of Kawagoe with the theme of "adding colour to Kawagoe". The set was reintroduced into service on 12 February 2019, and was used on the first down departure of the new "Kawagoe Limited Express" train category operating on the Tojo Line since the 16 March 2019 timetable revision.

=== Crayon Shin-chan 25th anniversary liveries ===
From 3 November 2016, 50050 series set 51055 received a yellow vinyl wrapping livery to mark the 25th anniversary of the cartoon character Crayon Shin-chan. This was followed by set 51056 in blue livery from 25 November, set 51057 in red livery from 28 November, set 51058 in orange livery from 12 December, and set 51059 in green livery from 19 December. These sets were originally scheduled to remain in these liveries until May 2017, but the period was extended until late August 2017.

Colour	Set No.	Character design	In service from
Yellow	51055	Shinnosuke Nohara	3 November 2016
Blue	51056	Kazuma-kun	25 November 2016
Red	51057	Nene-chan	28 November 2016
Orange	51058	Bo-chan	12 December 2016
Green	51059	Masao-kun	19 December 2016

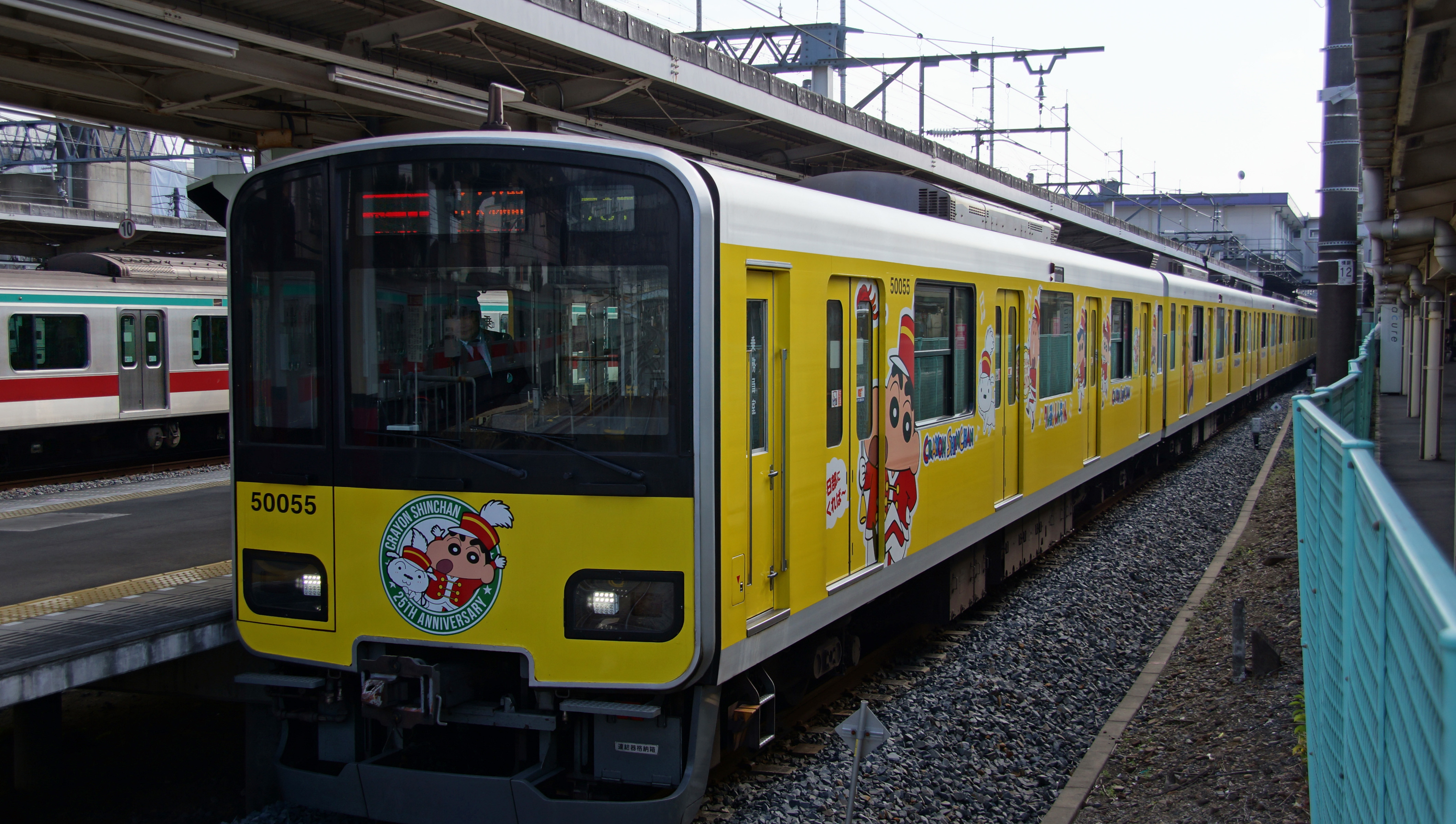
Set 51055 in yellow livery in February 2017

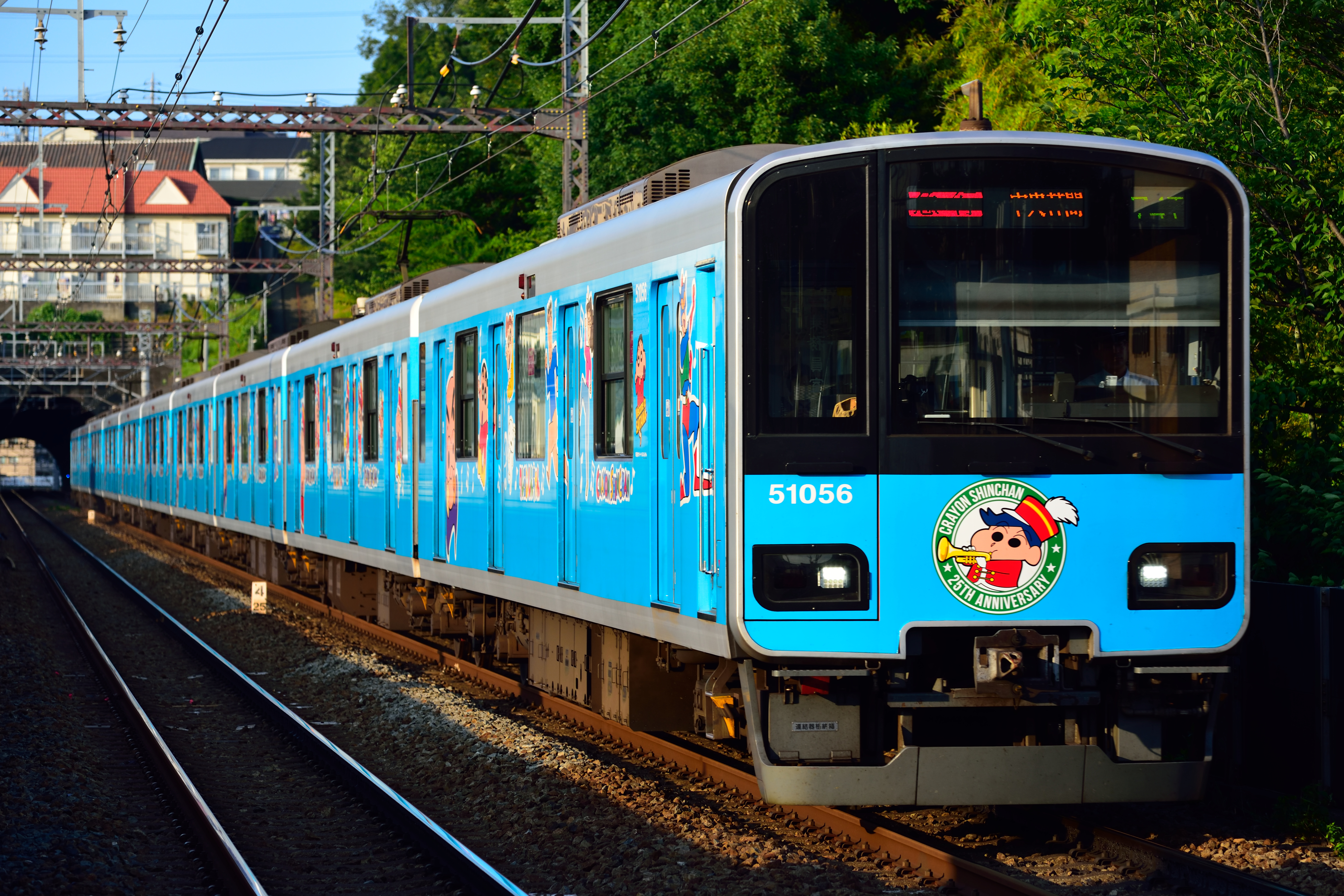
Set 51056 in blue livery in July 2017

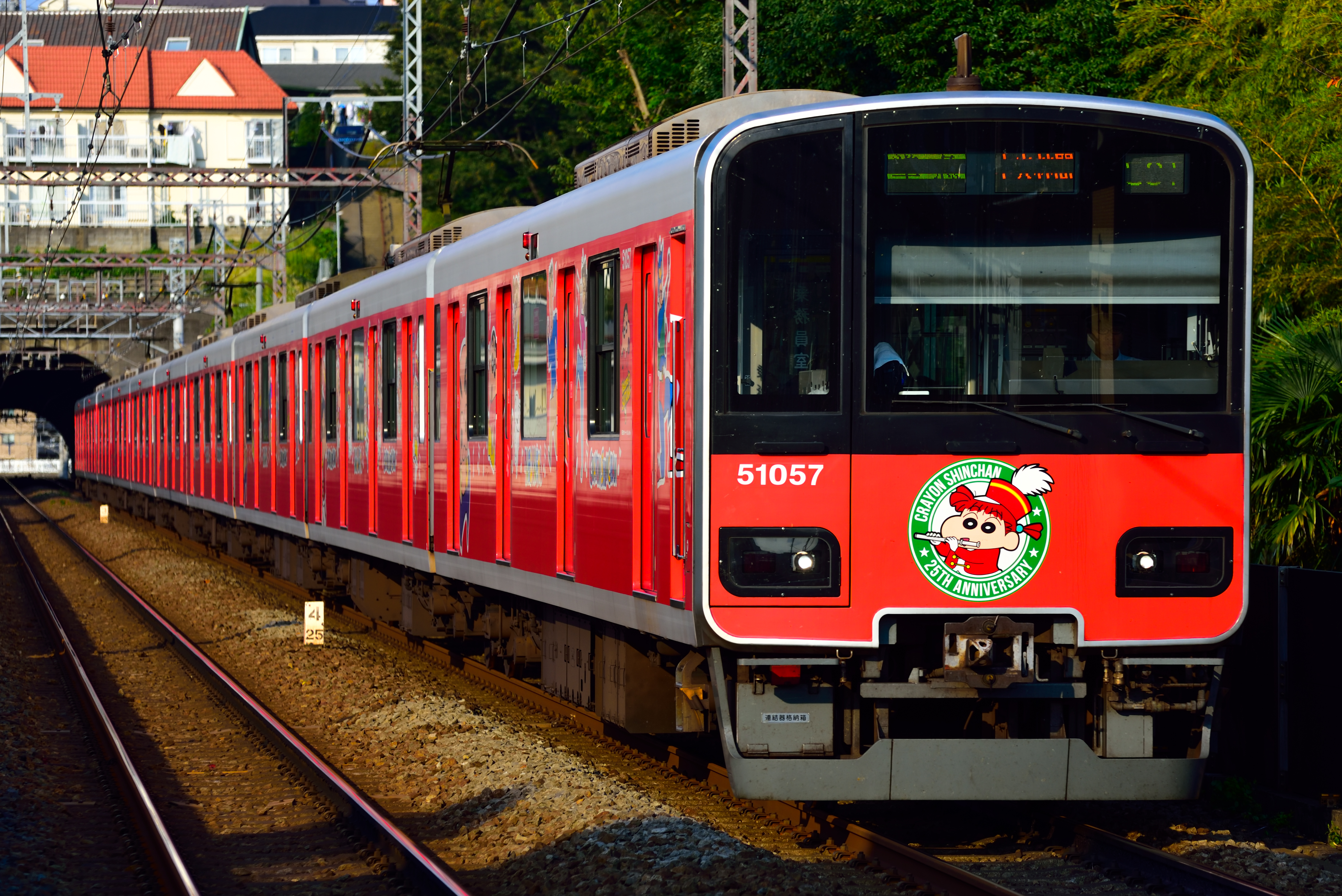
Set 51057 in red livery in September 2017

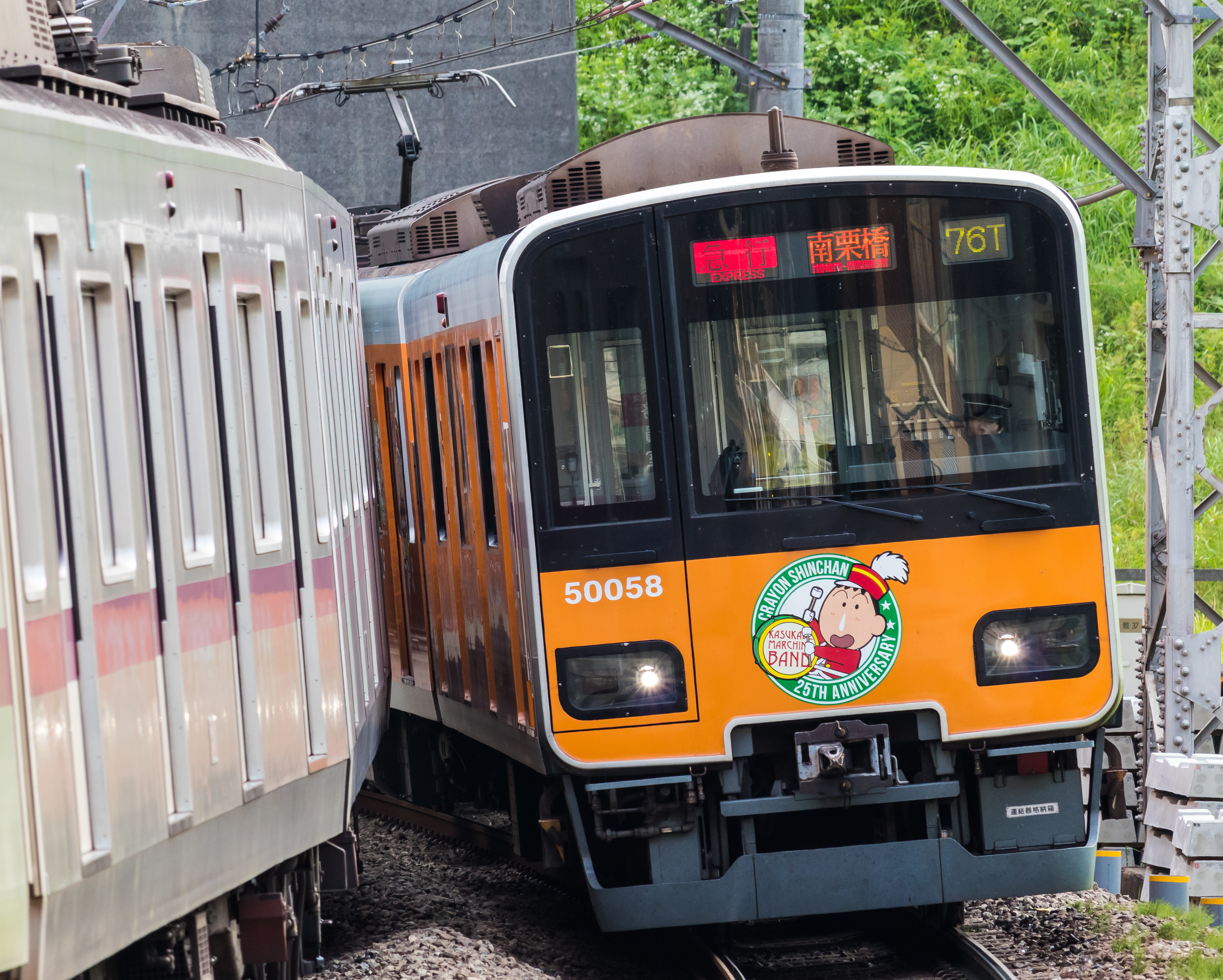
Set 51058 in orange livery in June 2017

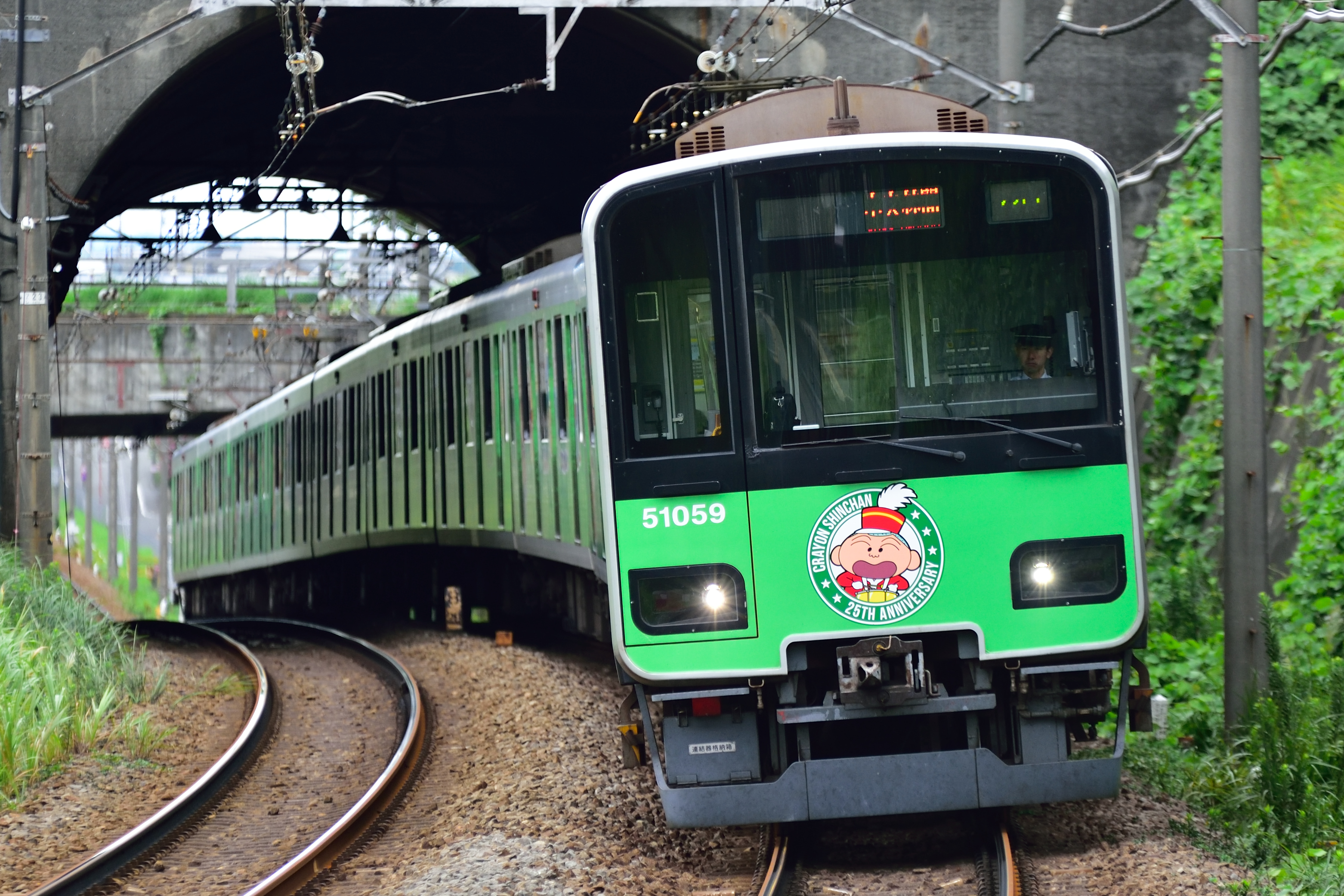
Set 51059 in green livery in August 2017

=== Quokka train ===
To celebrate the 5th anniversary of the arrival of the Quokkas at Saitama children's zoo in Higashimatsuyama a 50090 series train was decorated with livery featuring Quokka and other Australian animals, starting on October 13, 2025. Within the train there are also pictures of Quokka in the advertising space as well as quizzes

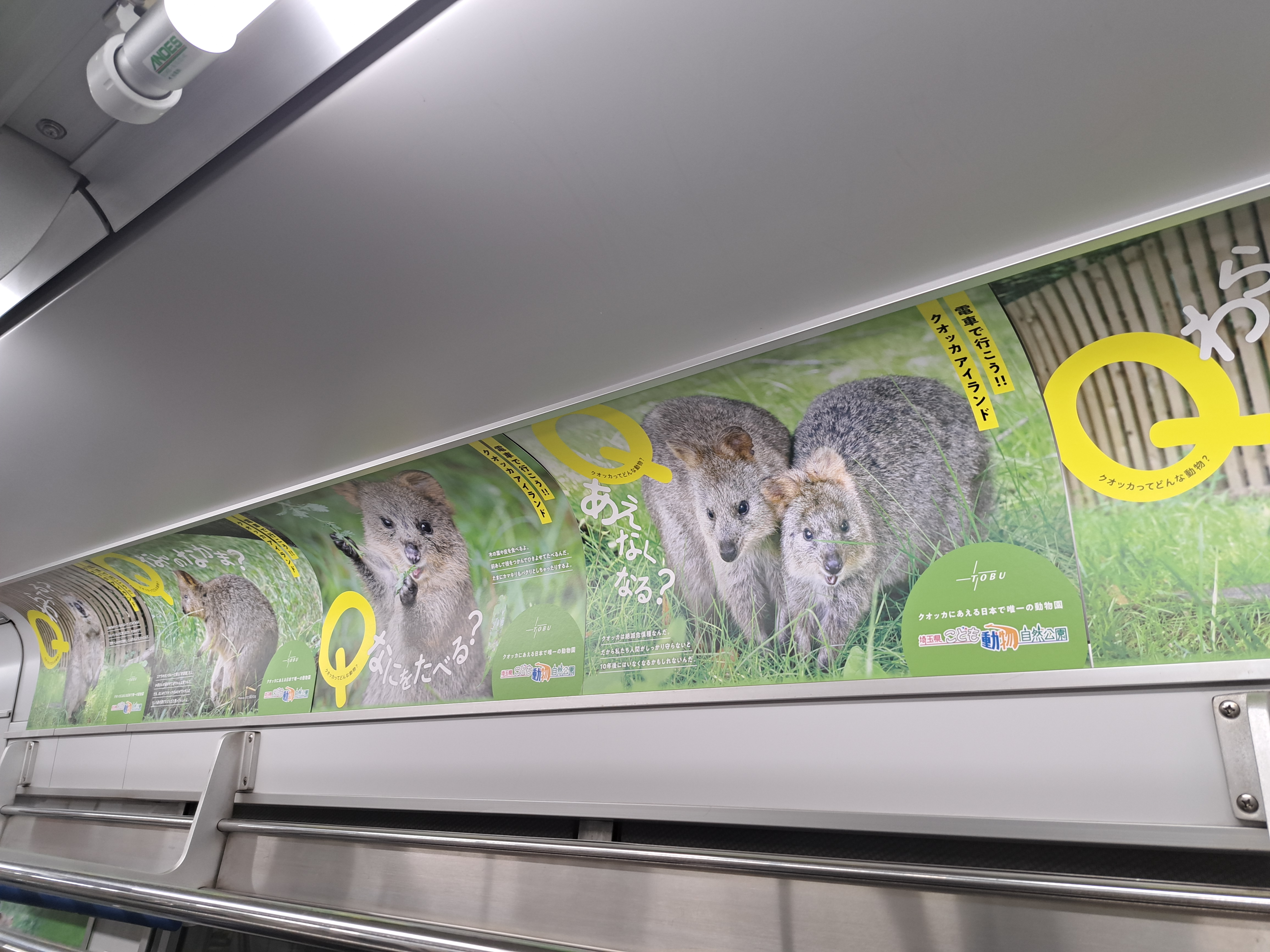
Interior of Quokka train showing advertisement space being used to promote the Quokka

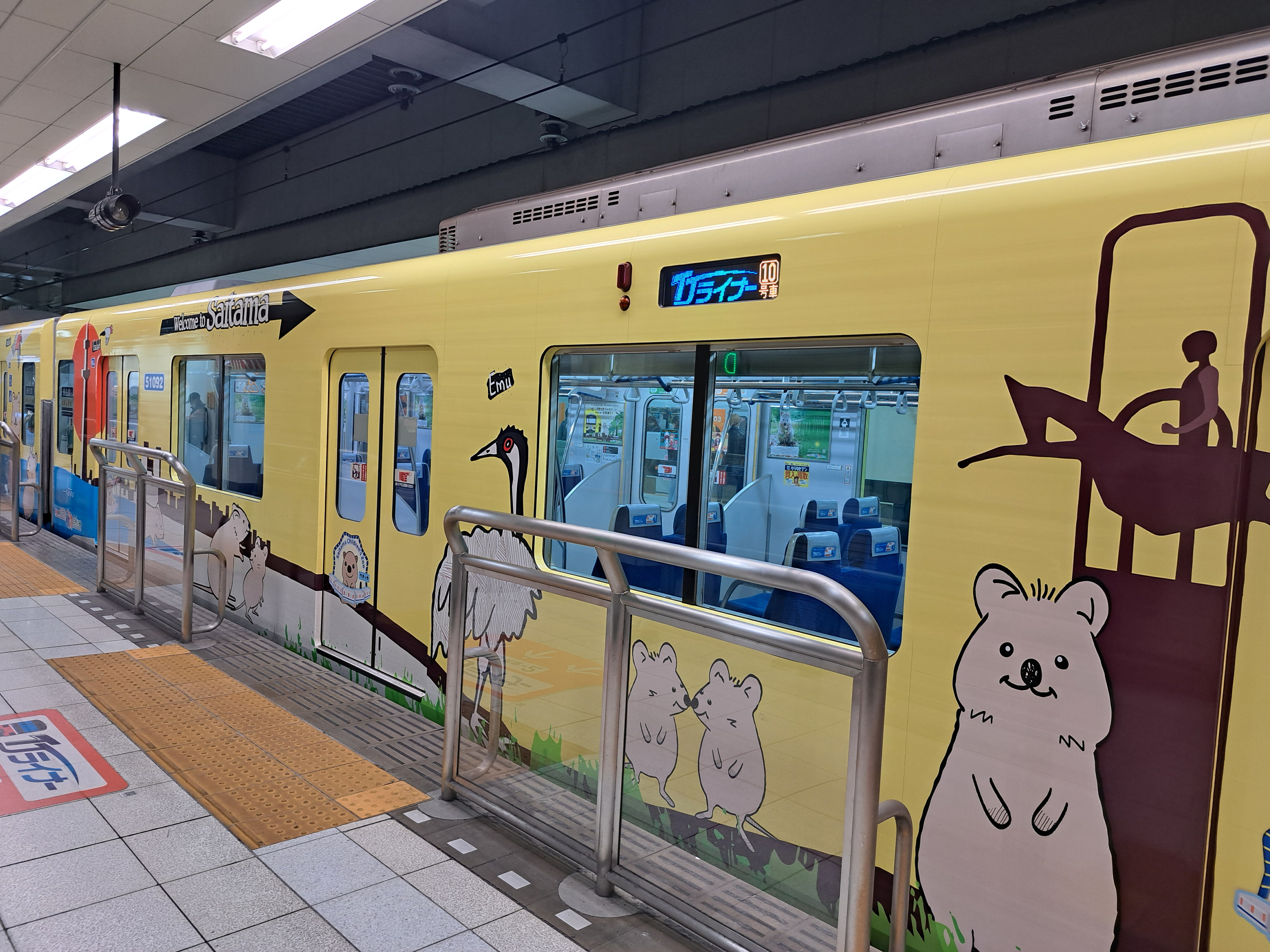
Side car of Quokka train showing Quokka and other Australian animals and themes

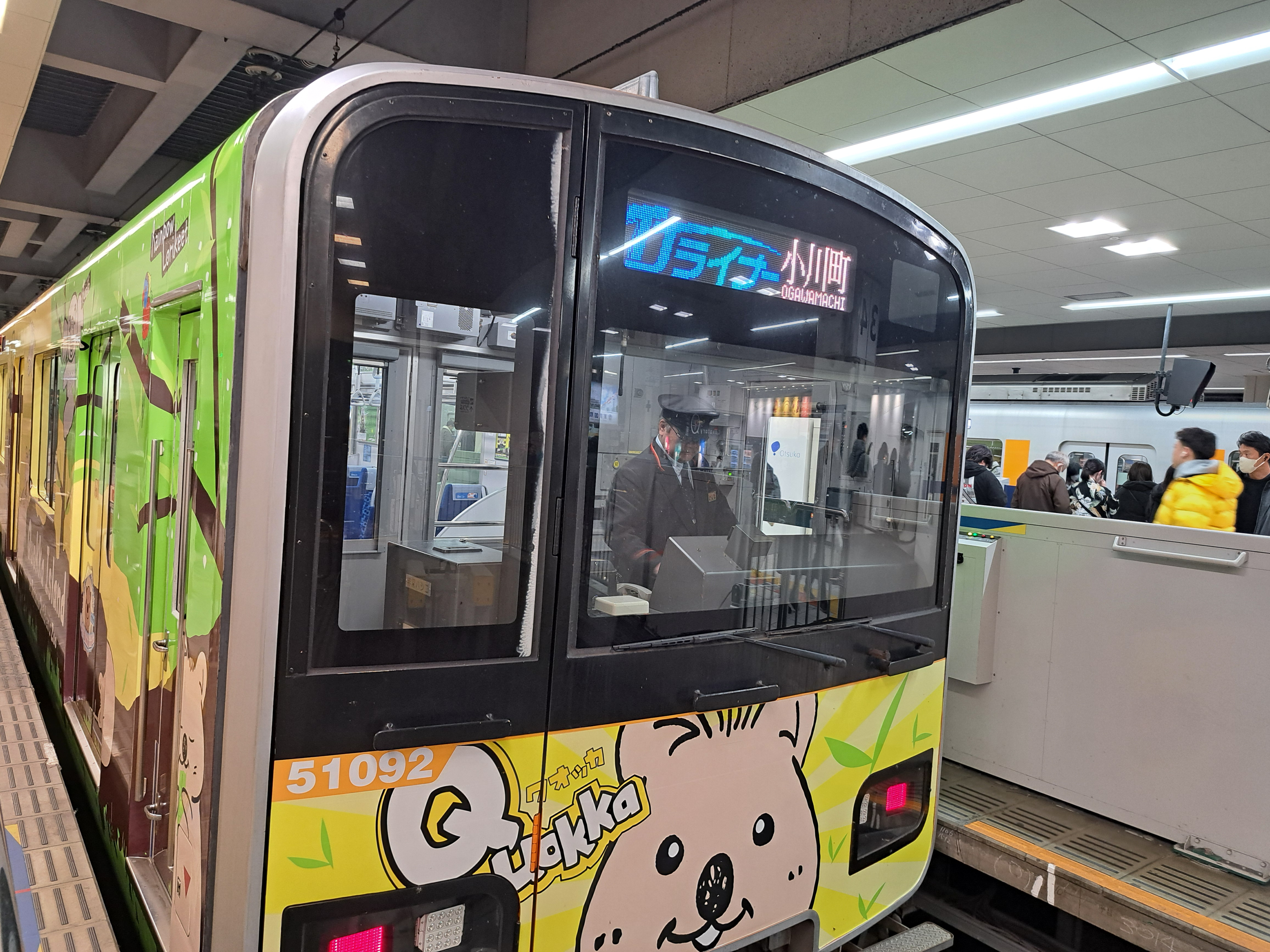
Front car showing a smiling Quokka

== See also ==
- Seibu 40000 series, a Seibu Railway commuter EMU type that also features rotating longitudinal/transverse seating
- Keio 5000 series, a Keio commuter EMU type that also features rotating longitudinal/transverse seating
- Keikyu 2100 series, a Keikyu commuter EMU type also features transverse seating
- Keikyu N1000 series, another Keikyu commuter EMU type also features rotating transverse seating (batch 20 only)
