= KidZania Tokyo =

Family edutainment center amusement park

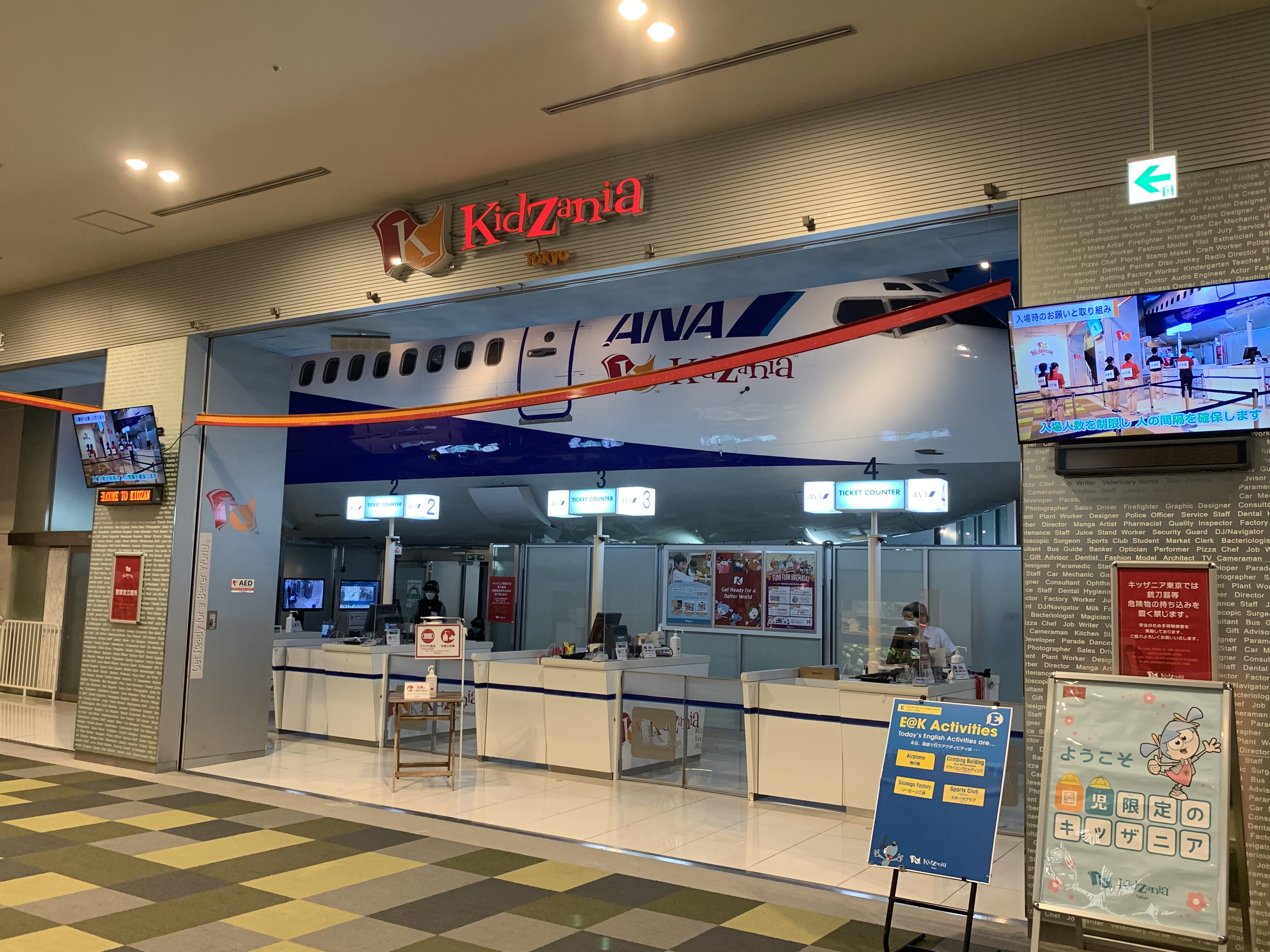
- Interactive map of KidZania Tokyo
- Location: 3F Urban Dock LaLaport Toyosu 1, North Port, 2-4-9 Toyosu, Kōtō City, Tokyo 135-8614, Japan
- Coordinates: 35°39′21″N 139°47′31″E
- Status: Operating
- Public transit: Yūrakuchō Line
- Opened: October 5, 2006
- Owner: Kidzania
- Operated by: KCJ Group Inc. and KDDI
- General manager: Reiko Kanzaki
- Theme: Educational entertainment
- Slogan: "Get ready for a better world."
- Operating season: Year-round
- Attendance: ▲765,000 visitors in 2024
- Area: 6.000 square metres (64.58 sq ft)
- Website: kidzania.jp/tokyo

KidZania Tokyo is a family edutainment center amusement park, in the LaLaport Toyosu, Tokyo, Japan opened in October 2006. A part of the Mexican Kidzania franchise, Kidzania Tokyo is the third ever Kidzania theme park ever built, preceded by Mexico City and Monterrey, and succeeded by Kidzania Jakarta.

== Overview ==
Like other Kidzania Theme parks, the Tokyo franchise offers 70 occupations for enjoyment by children; nevertheless, it was nearly identical to any other Kidzania theme parks in the franchise.

The park, as like other parks (excluding Kidzania Jakarta) in the franchise, aimed at children from the age of three to fourteen. Although it looks smaller than any other parks in the franchise, the occupations offered remained similar to its Mexican counterparts.

== Entry ==
As alike to any other parks in the franchise, the park provides a 50 kidzos check available for replacement with real money, and can be used at any establishment charged with a certain amount of money. You must work if you run out of Kidzos.

Contrary to any other Kidzania theme parks, Kidzania Tokyo allows pets to enter the park. However, it should be at control of visitors. The park issued a Terms And Conditions rule to maintain a safe and healthy playing environment in the park. Any disruptive, offensive, vulgar, libellous or any other activities disrupting the activity at Kidzania Tokyo, will result in the expulsion of the visitor from the park.
