= KidZania Jakarta =

Educational indoor theme park located in Jakarta, Indonesia

- KidZania Jakarta is a recreation center designed around a "play-and-learn" concept for children. It features a child-sized replica city complete with streets, buildings, retail facilities, and various vehicles as part of the play-and-learn experience.
- Interactive map of KidZania Jakarta
- Location: Pacific Place Mall, Jl. Jenderal Sudirman No.52-53, RT.5/RW.3, Senayan, Kebayoran Baru, South Jakarta, Jakarta 12190, Indonesia
- Coordinates: 6.225220°S 106.809950°E
- Status: Operating
- Public transit: Jakarta MRT; KRL Commuterline; TransJakarta
- Opened: November 26, 2007
- Owner: KidZania
- Operated by: PT Aryan Indonesia
- General manager: Kerry Riza
- Theme: Educational entertainment
- Slogan: "Get Ready for a Better World"
- Operating season: Year-round
- Attendance: ▲650,000 visitors in 2015
- Area: 7,488.10 square metres (80,601.2 sq ft)
- Website: Official website

KidZania Jakarta is a recreational center franchised from Mexico that offers a "play-while-learning" concept for children ranging from kindergarten to elementary school age. Featuring the concept of a child-sized city replica, the center includes streets, buildings, retail outlets, and various vehicles that circulate throughout the city. KidZania Jakarta was the first franchise in Southeast Asia and the second outside Mexico, following Japan.

== History ==
Established in November 2007, KidZania Jakarta is operated by PT Aryan Indonesia. The company (PT Aryan Indonesia) is owned by the husband-and-wife team of Roestriana Adrianti and Mohammad Riza Chalid, with an investment of US$10 million. In 2008, the couple's son, Muhammad Kerry Adrianto, became the KidZania "City Mayor" and participated in the opening of the Nippon Paint and Garuda Indonesia pavilions.

== Facilities ==
KidZania Jakarta is an indoor recreation center... It is located on the sixth floor of the Pacific Place shopping center and covers an area of 7,500 square meters. This recreational facility targets children aged 2 to 16, allowing them to role-play various professions—such as dentists (using dolls and dental equipment), doctors (with an operating room), police officers, television studio staff, and even tax office employees. Children can also learn acting and perform live. These professional activity areas are known as "pavilions," and as of 2013, KidZania Jakarta featured 71 pavilions.
