= PCOE =

PCOE, PCoE or P.C.o.E. may refer to:

- Parshvanath College of Engineering, an engineering college located in Thane (west) in Maharashtra state of India, and affiliated to the University of Mumbai.
- Patton College of Education in Athens, Ohio, affiliated with Ohio University.
- Spanish Communist Workers' Party (1921), a minor communist political party founded in 1921 in Spain.
- Spanish Communist Workers' Party (1973), a minor communist political party founded in 1973 in Spain.
- Pharmacy Centric Order Entry, used for electronically prescribing of medications>
