= Parshvanath College of Engineering =

College in India

Coordinates: 19°16′05″N 72°58′03″E

- Type: Private, undergraduate, Jain religious minority college of engineering
- Active: 1994–2012
- Accreditation: All India Council for Technical Education, Directorate of Technical Education of Maharashtra state.
- Academic affiliations: University of Mumbai
- Academic staff: 90
- Administrative staff: > 100
- Students: > 1400
- Undergraduates: > 1400
- Postgraduates: 0
- Doctoral students: 0
- Location: Kasarvadavali, Thane, Maharashtra, India
- Campus: Urban, near forest cover of Sanjay Gandhi National Park
- Website: www.pctce.com
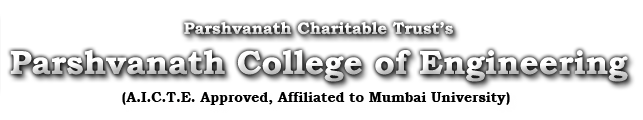

The Parshvanath College of Engineering was a private engineering college located in Kasarvadavali, Thane district of Maharashtra state in India. It was established in 1994, and was managed by the Parshvanath Charitable Trust. It was a Jain religious minority college (i.e., half of all seats are reserved for students from the Jain religious minority community). While it was functioning, it was affiliated to the University of Mumbai (a public university funded by the state government of Maharashtra), was accredited by the All India Council for Technical Education (AICTE) of the Government of India, and was recognised by the Directorate of Technical Education (DTE) of the state government of Maharashtra.

It offered undergraduate education leading to the University of Mumbai's "Bachelor of Engineering" (B.E.) degree in any 1 of the following 6 disciplines: mechanical engineering, instrumentation engineering, computer engineering, information technology, civil engineering, and electronics and telecommunication engineering. The ordinary duration of these undergraduate courses is four years.

In December 2012, following the conclusion of a case against the AICTE in the Supreme Court of India, the college was closed down, and all students were transferred by the DTE to other engineering colleges of the University of Mumbai for the remainder of their courses.

== History ==
The college was established in 1994 by the Parshvanath Charitable Trust, then managed by trustee Mr. Tekchand Shah. It offered instruction leading to the University of Mumbai's Bachelor of Engineering degree (four-year duration) in three disciplines: computer engineering, electronics and telecommunication engineering, and instrumentation engineering. The first batch of students graduated in 1998. New departments were subsequently started: mechanical engineering in 1996 (first batch graduating in 2000), information technology in 1999 (first batch graduating in 2003), and civil engineering in 2010 (first batch intended to graduate in 2014). All departments offered degrees of the University of Mumbai.

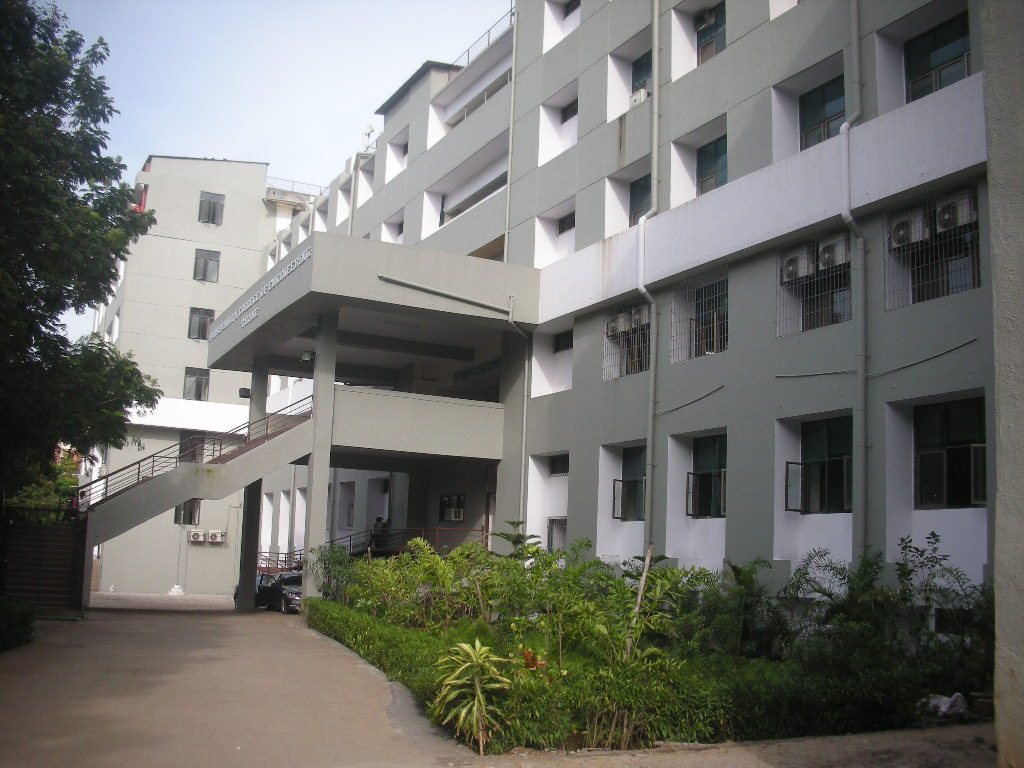
Entry view of the college.

The college shifted from its original, 4-storied campus on the west side of Ghodbunder Road to the newer, 5-storied campus on the east side, in 2008. Till 2012, the old campus was used as a polytechnic (named "M.M.J. Shah Polytechnic"), offering engineering diplomas (in the same branches as the degree college) of three-year duration to students who had completed class 10 of the Indian school education system. The administrative and financial offices of both the degree college and the diploma polytechnic continued to be the same till 2010, housed in the old campus. In 2010, a transition was made, enabling each institution to have its separate office in its own campus. The diploma polytechnic was closed down in 2012.

The college had faced some issues in the past, as described separately in the "Issues" section of this article.

== Campus and location ==
The college's original campus was a 4-storied building on the west side of Ghodbundar Road, in Kasarvadavali. The new 5- and 6-storied campus of the engineering college is on the east side of Ghodbunder Road. The campus is set up on land belonging to the Jethalal Lakhamsi Charitable Trust, which has given it on lease to the Parshvanath Charitable Trust.

From 2008 to 2012, the old campus housed a diploma polytechnic (named "M.M.J. Shah Polytechnic") that offered three-year engineering diplomas to students passing class 10.

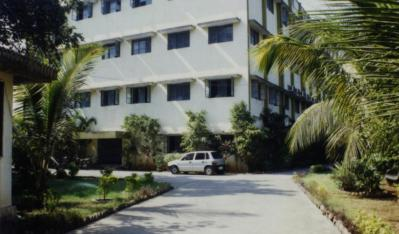
Entry view of the old campus of the degree college (housed the diploma polytechnic from 2008 to 2012).

In 2012, the adjoining "Veermata Hiraben P. Shah College of Pharmacy" (also managed by the Parshvanath Charitable Trust and affiliated to the University of Mumbai) was closed down. Its 6-storied building then became a part of the campus of the Parshvanath College of Engineering.

The campus was Wi-Fi enabled. Surveillance was carried out through CCTV cameras in the laboratories and classrooms. Initially, a centralised air-conditioning system for the whole building was planned. Even AC ducts were installed in the ceilings. But the system never became completely operational. Ultimately, ceiling fans had to be installed in all the rooms. Air-conditioning units were installed wherever they were needed (e.g. computer labs, seminar halls, etc.)

Located in Kasarvadavali Naka on Ghodbunder Road, nearby places of interest include the shopping complex having HyperCity Mall, BIG MegaMart, McDonald's fast food restaurant, etc. Nearby, there are also commercial buildings (e.g. that of G-Corp), as well as many existing and under-construction residential areas.

Various small local shops and restaurants also exist nearby.

At some distance from Kasarvadavli, the natural forest cover of Sanjay Gandhi National Park starts growing. Parts of this forest cover, along with portions of the Vasai Creek, can be seen while travelling on the Ghodbunder Road.

== Admissions ==
Admissions to the seats (not reserved for the Jain religious minority) of the first year of undergraduate engineering programs (for students completing class 12) were carried out via the Centralized Admissions Process (CAP) of the Directorate of Technical Education (DTE) of the state government of Maharashtra. Scores of undergraduate engineering entrance examinations were used: 85% of CAP seats were filled using the Maharashtra Health-Technical Common Entrance Test (MHT-CET) scores, and the remaining 15% of CAP seats were filled using the All India Engineering/Architecture Entrance Examination (AIEEE).

Till the 2011 admissions, intake for each engineering branch was 60 students. (This intake is only for admissions to the first year of the four-year B.E. degree program. It does not include the direct admissions to the second year for students who have completed three-year engineering diplomas.)

The admissions to the seats reserved for the Jain religious minority were also carried out using scores of engineering entrance examinations, but they were privately managed by the college. The DTE did not manage them.

As it was a private college, it also had some "institute-level seats" which were filled in any manner as decided by the college management.

The college also had direct admissions to the second year of the engineering programs for students who complete a three-year engineering diploma, after completing class 10.

== Departments ==
The college had the following academic departments:

=== Mechanical Engineering ===
The department of mechanical engineering was established in 1996. It offered the Bachelor of Engineering degree in mechanical engineering.

Its facilities included CNC machines, Master CAM licensed copies of Ansys 6.4, I-ideas AutoCAD-2004 in the CAD/CAM laboratory setup, etc. The CAD/CAM aided lab had 25 systems connected with True colour Resolution monitors of 21 inches, Digital Plotter, Scanner.

The department laboratories included the following:

- CAD (computer-aided design) / CAM (computer-aided manufacturing) Lab.
- Heat and Mass Transfer lab.
- Fluid Mechanics Lab.
- Refrigeration and Air Conditioning Lab.
- Mechatronics Lab.
- Hydraulic Machinery Lab.
- Workshop and Machine Shop (initially in the basement, later transferred to the ground floor).
- Internal Combustion Engine Lab.
- Strength of materials lab (shared with the department of civil engineering).
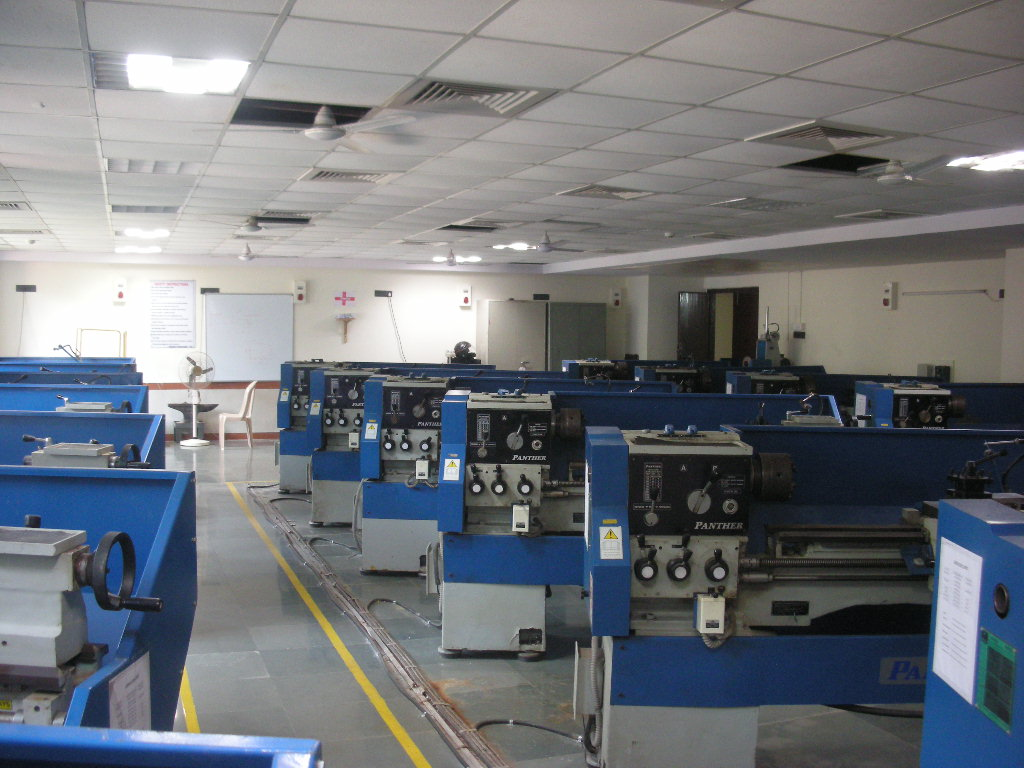
Machine-Shop.

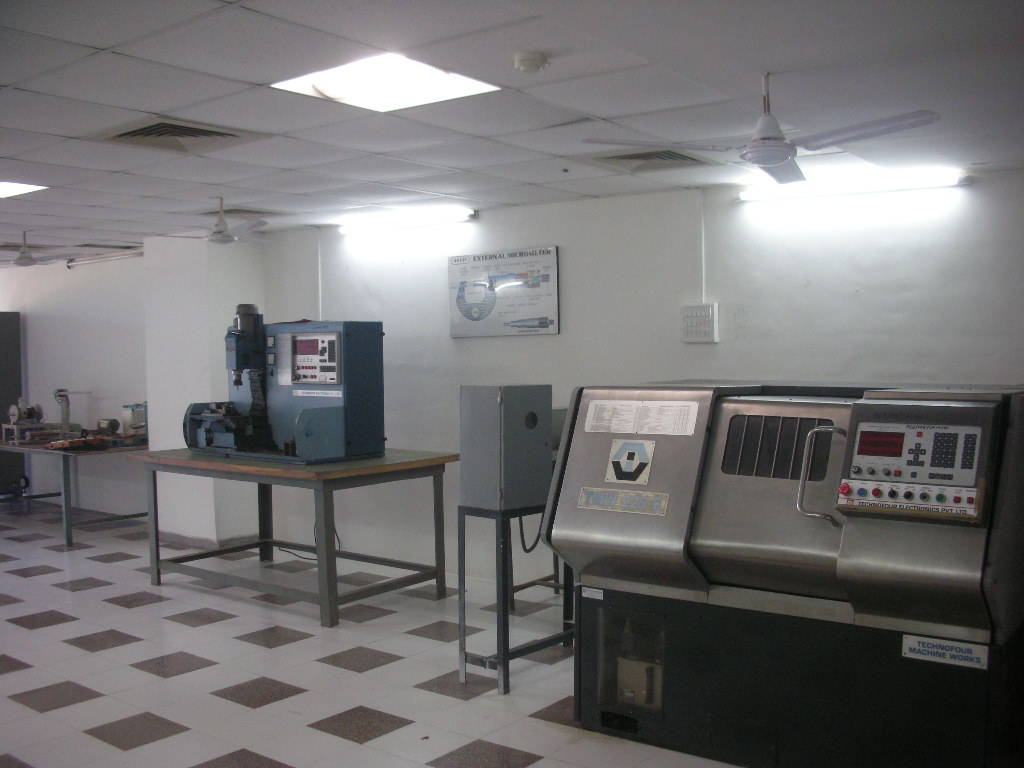
Lab for "Material Technology", "Computer Aided Manufacturing" and "Mechanical Measurements and Metrology".

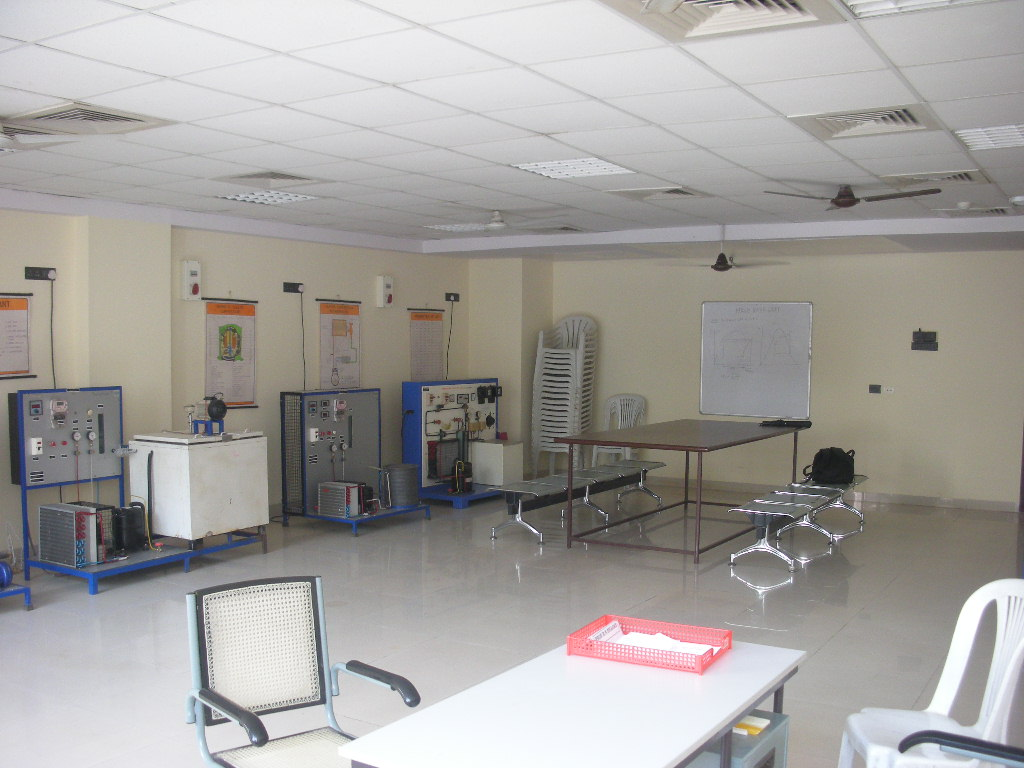
Refrigeration and Air-conditioning lab.

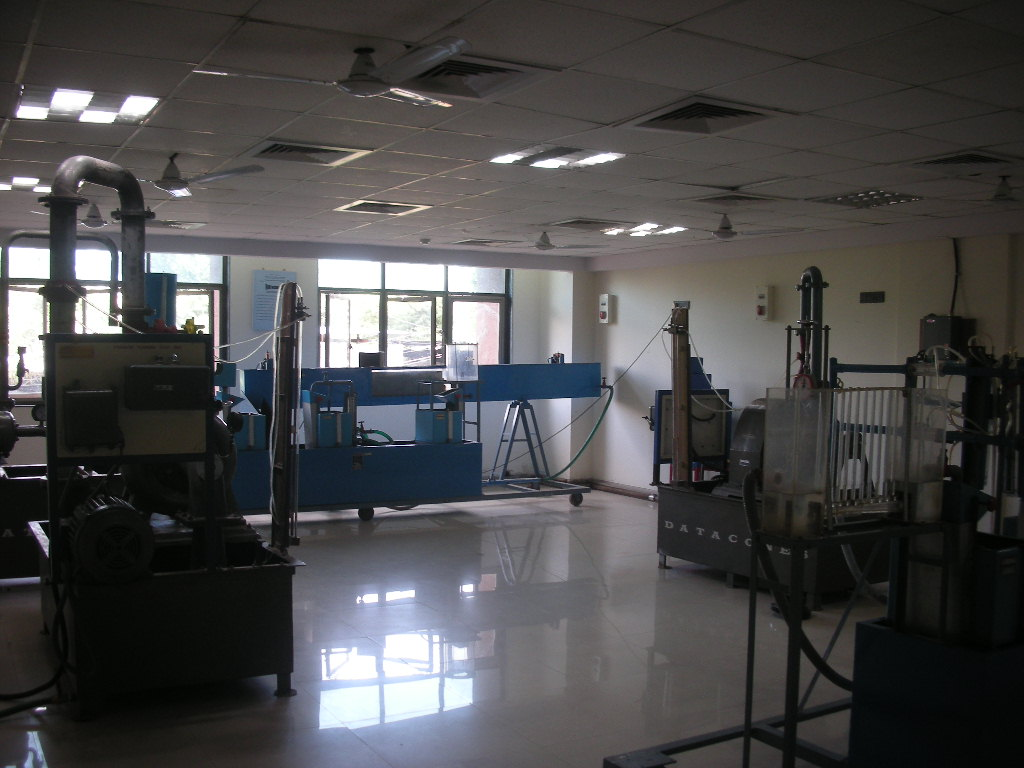
Fluid Mechanics and Hydraulic Machinery lab.

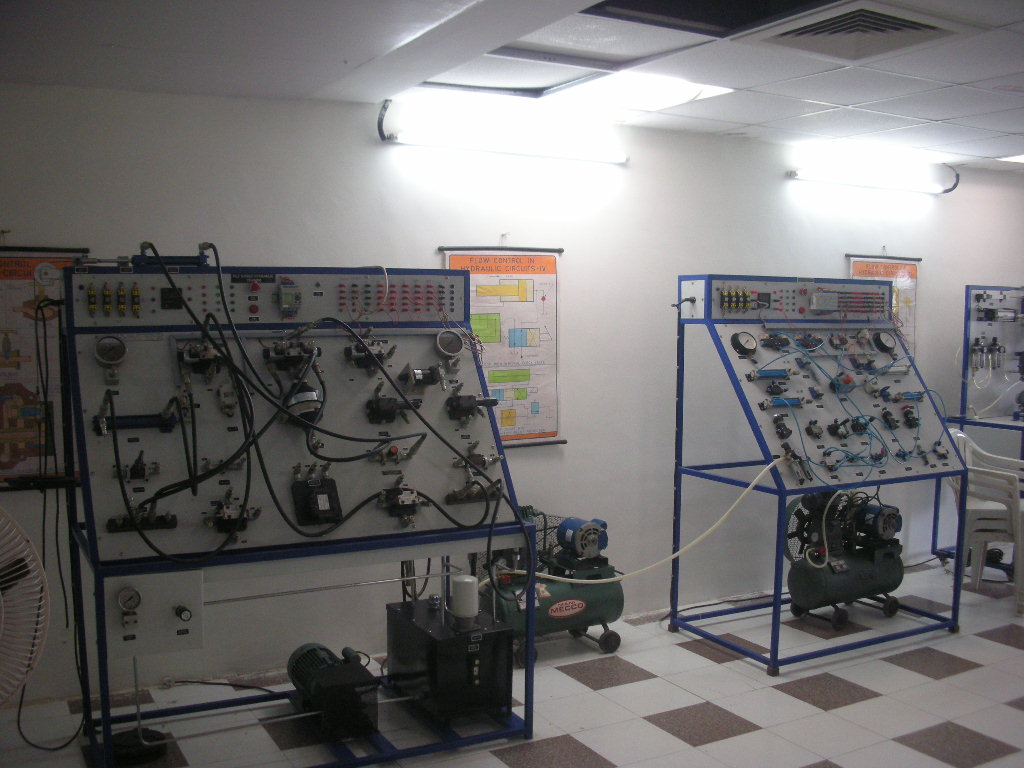
Mechatronics lab.

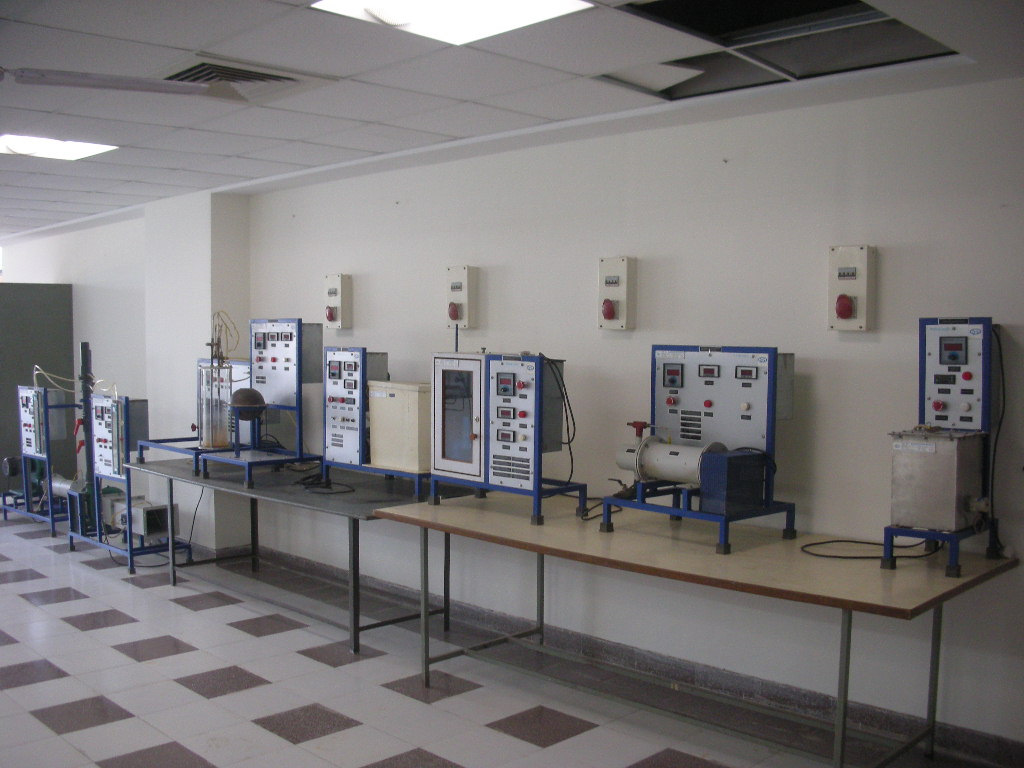
Heat and Mass Transfer lab.

=== Electronics and Telecommunications Engineering ===
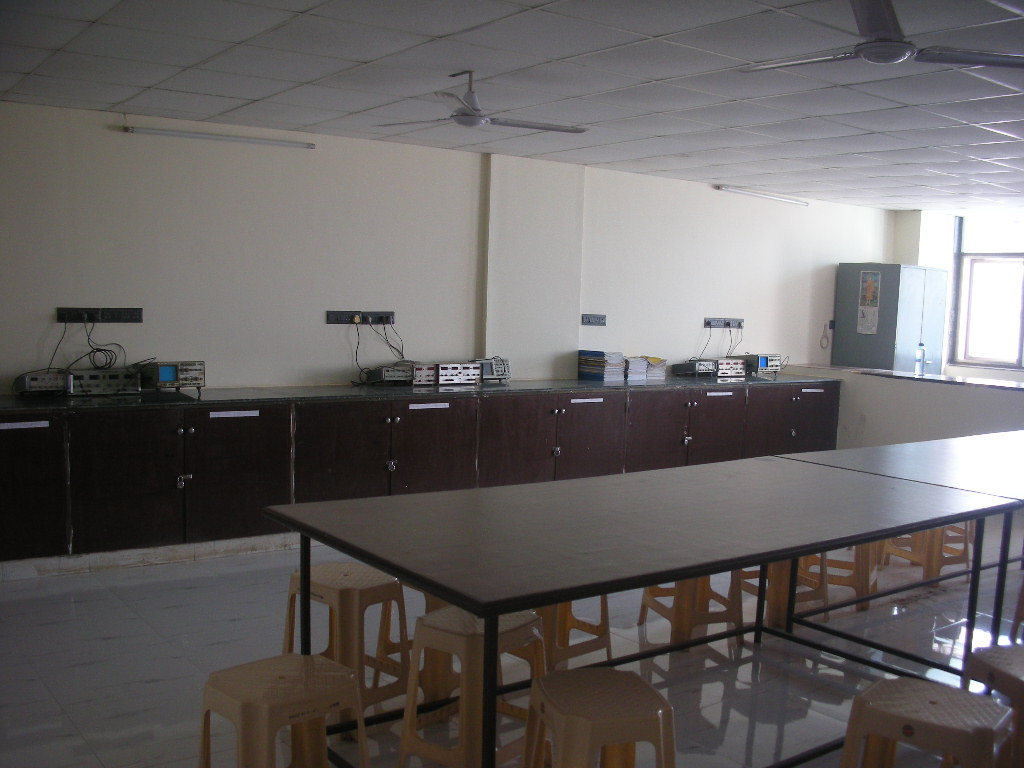
Control systems lab.

The department of electronics and telecommunication engineering was established in 1994. It offered the Bachelor of Engineering degree in electronics and telecommunication engineering. It was equipped with the following laboratories:

- Television engineering and PCB lab.
- Power electronics and drives lab.
- Electronic circuit lab.
- Digital electronics and micro-processor lab.
- Control systems lab.
- Electrical networks lab.
- Communication lab.

=== Information Technology ===
The department of Information Technology was established in 1999. It offered the Bachelor of Engineering degree in Information Technology.

It housed a number of specialist laboratories to extend the general computing provision. The labs were equipped with specialist software such as Oracle, Microsoft Visual Studio, Java, the Adobe Creative Suite and many other key products. The main corporate operating system was Microsoft Windows, but many labs had Linux installed as well. All labs provided free Internet access.

There was also a specialist networking lab that was equipped with more than 20 enterprise level network switches and routers, including wireless and VoIP devices. There was a dedicated security and software forensics laboratory. There were also many special-purpose facilities for embedded system development and robotics.

The following laboratories were managed by this department:

- Project / Research and Development Lab.
- Software Testing Lab.
- Computer Graphics and Image Processing Lab.
- Web Engineering Lab.
- Network Security Lab.
- System Software Lab.
- Database and Server Security Lab.
- Mobile Computing Lab.

=== Computer Engineering ===
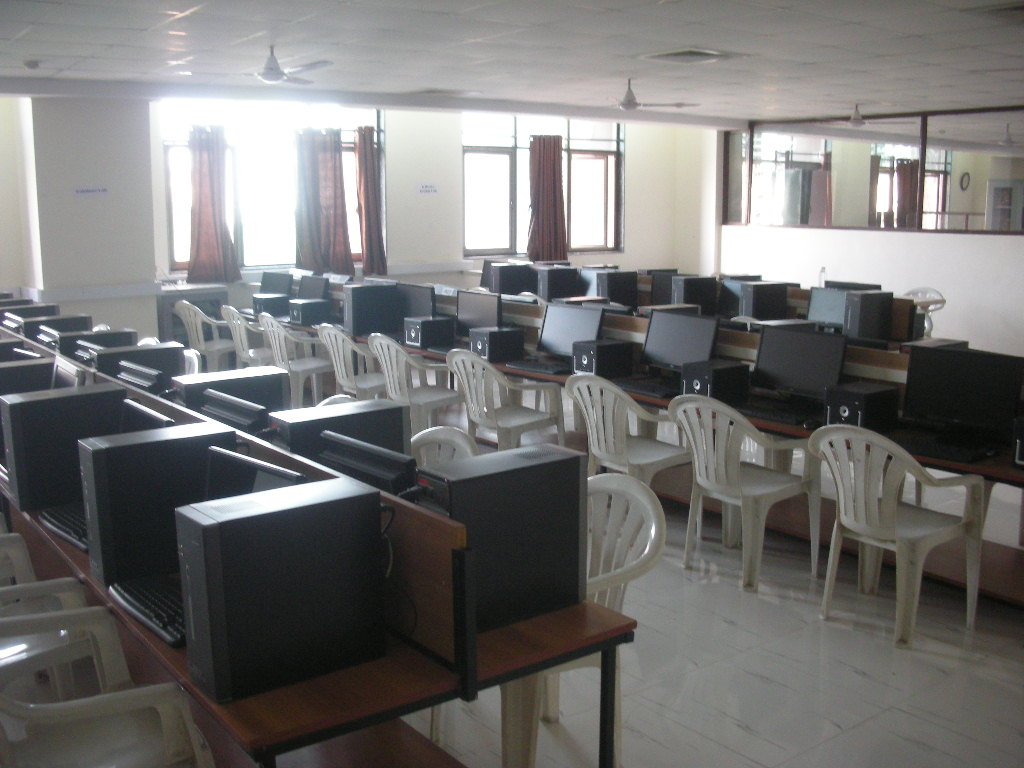
A computer lab.

The department of computer engineering was established in 1994, and it offered the Bachelor of Engineering degree in computer engineering.

The department had 400+ nodes and 12 servers all networked with Linux, Microsoft Windows and NOVELL NetWare.

=== Instrumentation Engineering ===
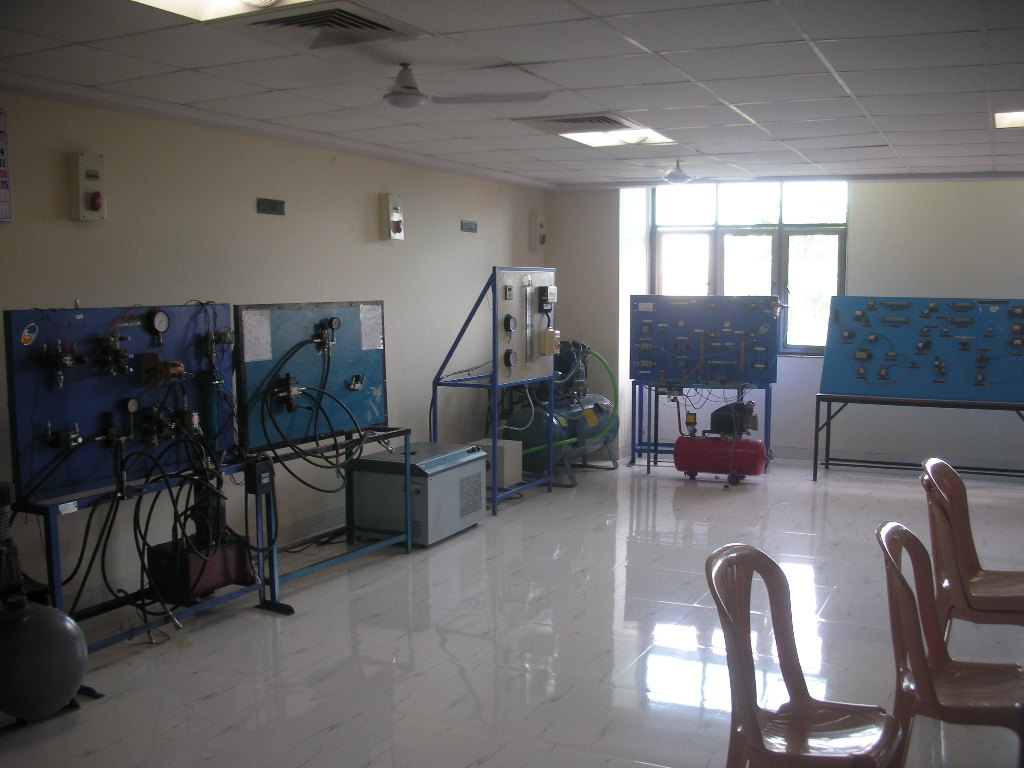
Process automation lab.

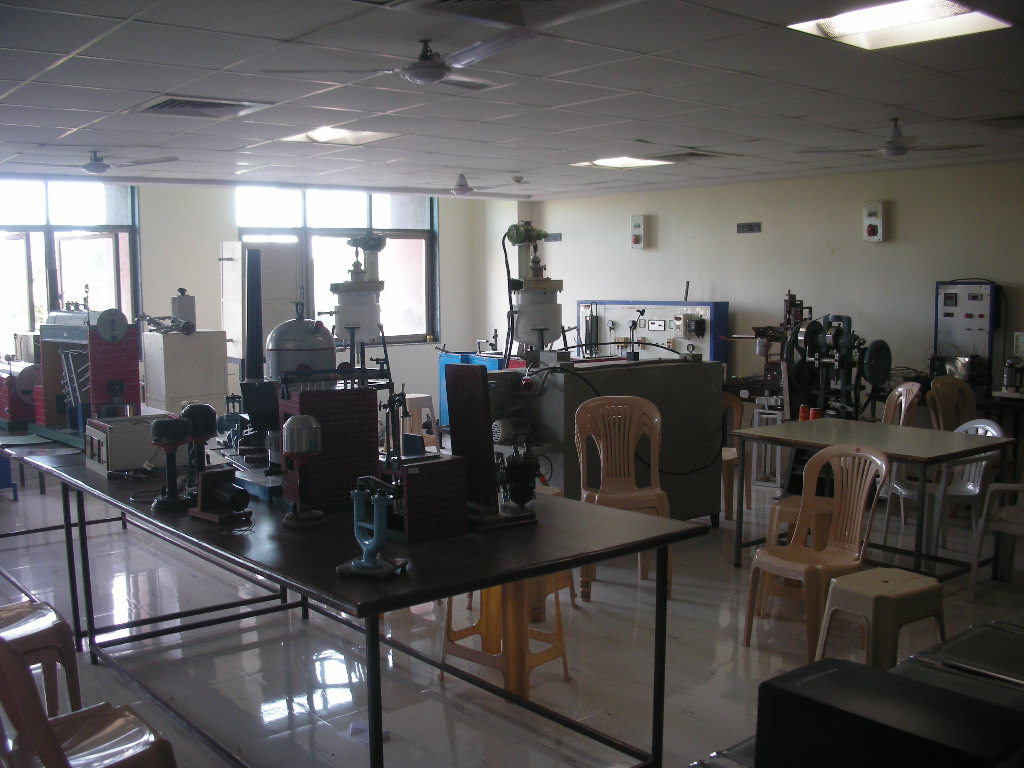
Process automation lab.

The department was established in 1994, and it offered an undergraduate course (Bachelor of Engineering in instrumentation engineering) with specialisation in process instrumentation, automation in energy & infrastructure, and power plant instrumentation.

It was equipped with laboratory facilities that included arenas like Signal Processing & Simulation, Process Automation, Biomedical instrumentation, Control, Analytical instrumentation, Digital Electronics and Embedded Systems, Electrical Technology and Instrumentation, Transducers & Measurement and Communication for academic development of students with Wi-Fi facility & separate departmental library.

The department also had a student section of the International Society of Automation (ISA).

The department had the following laboratories:

- Control and Communication Lab
- Electronics and Signal Conditioning Lab
- Analytical Instrumentation Lab
- Biomedical Instrumentation Lab
- Transducers and Measurement Lab
- Process Automation Lab
- Instrumentation Software and Simulation Lab
- Digital electronics and Embedded System Lab
- Electrical Technology and Instrumentation Lab
- Power Electronics and Drives Lab

=== Civil Engineering ===
The department of civil engineering was the most recent department of the college. It was established in 2010. It offered the Bachelor of Engineering degree in civil engineering. The first batch of its students would have graduated in 2014, had the college continued functioning.

The department had the following laboratories:

- Engineering geology lab
- Soil mechanics lab
- Transportation lab
- Environmental engineering lab
- Concrete technology lab
- Building material and construction lab
- Strength of materials lab (shared with the department of mechanical engineering)

=== Applied Sciences and Humanities ===
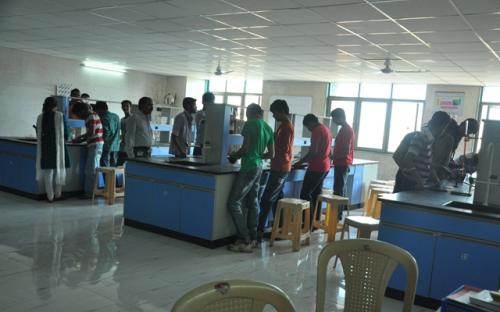
Students at the applied chemistry laboratory of the college.

The department of applied sciences and humanities did not offer any degrees of its own. It supported the curriculum of other departments by offering courses in the following disciplines:

- Applied mathematics (first four or five semesters in each branch)
- Applied physics (first two semesters)
- Applied chemistry (first two semesters)
- Communication skills (second semester)
- Presentation and communication techniques (third semester of each branch)
- Environmental studies (fifth semester of each branch except civil engineering)

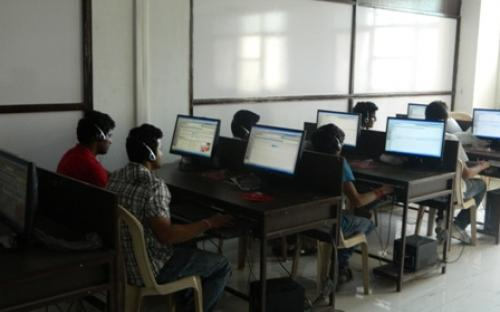
Students at the language laboratory (for the subjects of "communication skills" and "presentation & communication techniques").

In the four-year Bachelor of Engineering curriculum of the University of Mumbai, the first year (i.e., the first two semesters) is common for all engineering majors. Thus, first-year students of the Parshvanath College of Engineering were managed by the department of applied sciences and humanities, rather than the departments of the engineering branches that they had taken admission in.

The department of applied sciences and humanities had the following laboratories:

- Applied Chemistry Lab
- Applied Physics Lab
- Computer Programming Lab
- Engineering Mechanics Lab
- Language Lab (for the subjects of communication skills and presentation & communication techniques)
- Basic Electrical & Electronics Engineering Lab
- Sci Lab (for Scilab software taught in applied mathematics)

== Extra-curricular activities ==
There were various clubs and societies formed by the students. Prominent among them was "Pehel", a society of students dedicated to social work. It was started in the academic year 2009–2010 by a group of first-year students and had organised several events for a social cause, e.g. blood donation camps, student activity days for municipality schools, donations to the underprivileged and homeless, etc.

The college also maintained a student council.

Annual technology festival – Avishkar

The college had an annual technology festival named "Avishkar" (meaning "invention" in Hindi). It included various technical events like robotic races, robotic soccer matches and wars, technical quizzes, Junkyard Wars-like competition, technology exhibitions, LAN gaming events, etc.

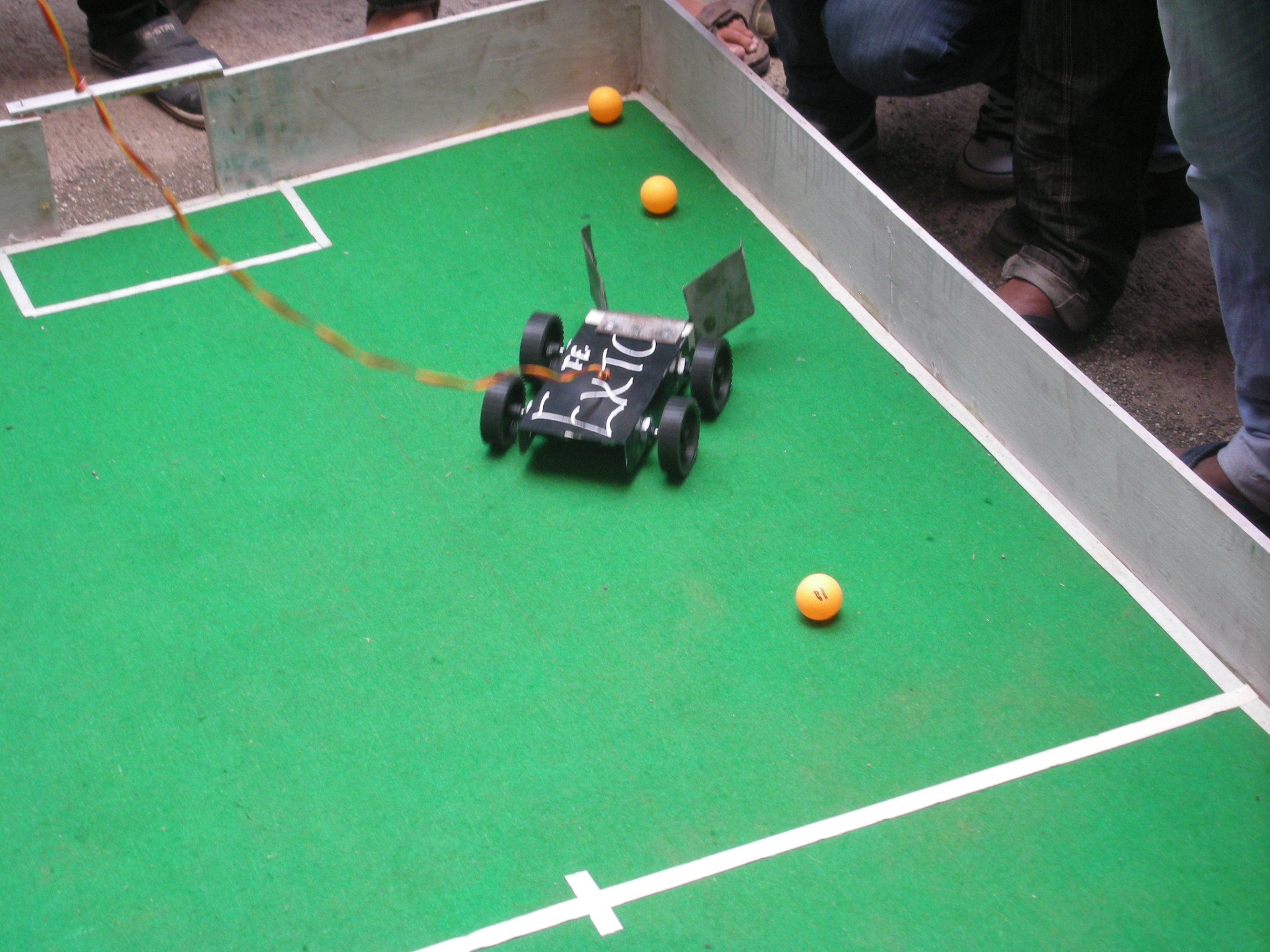
A robotics competition at Avishkar 2012.

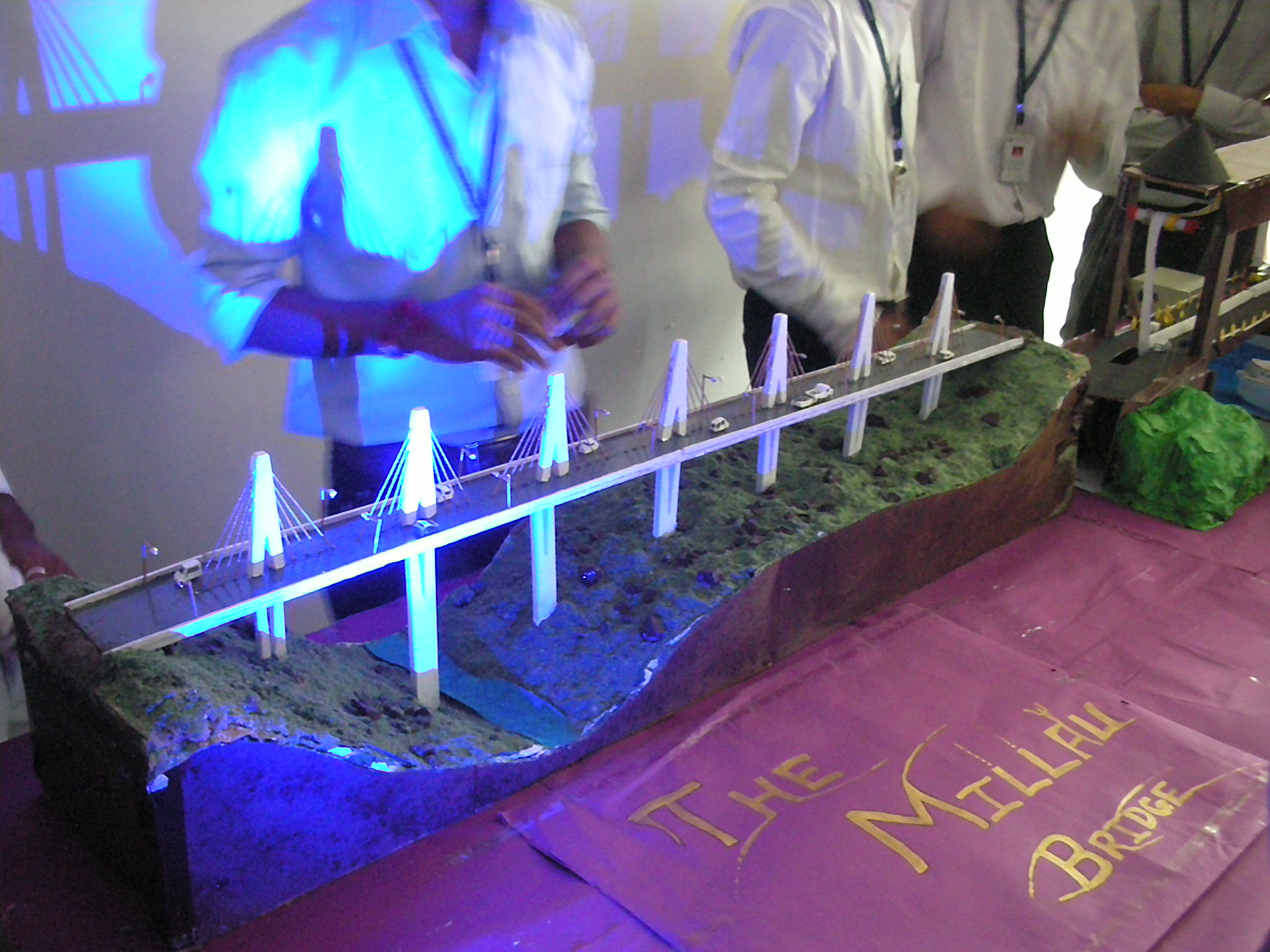
A civil engineering exhibition at Avishkar 2012.

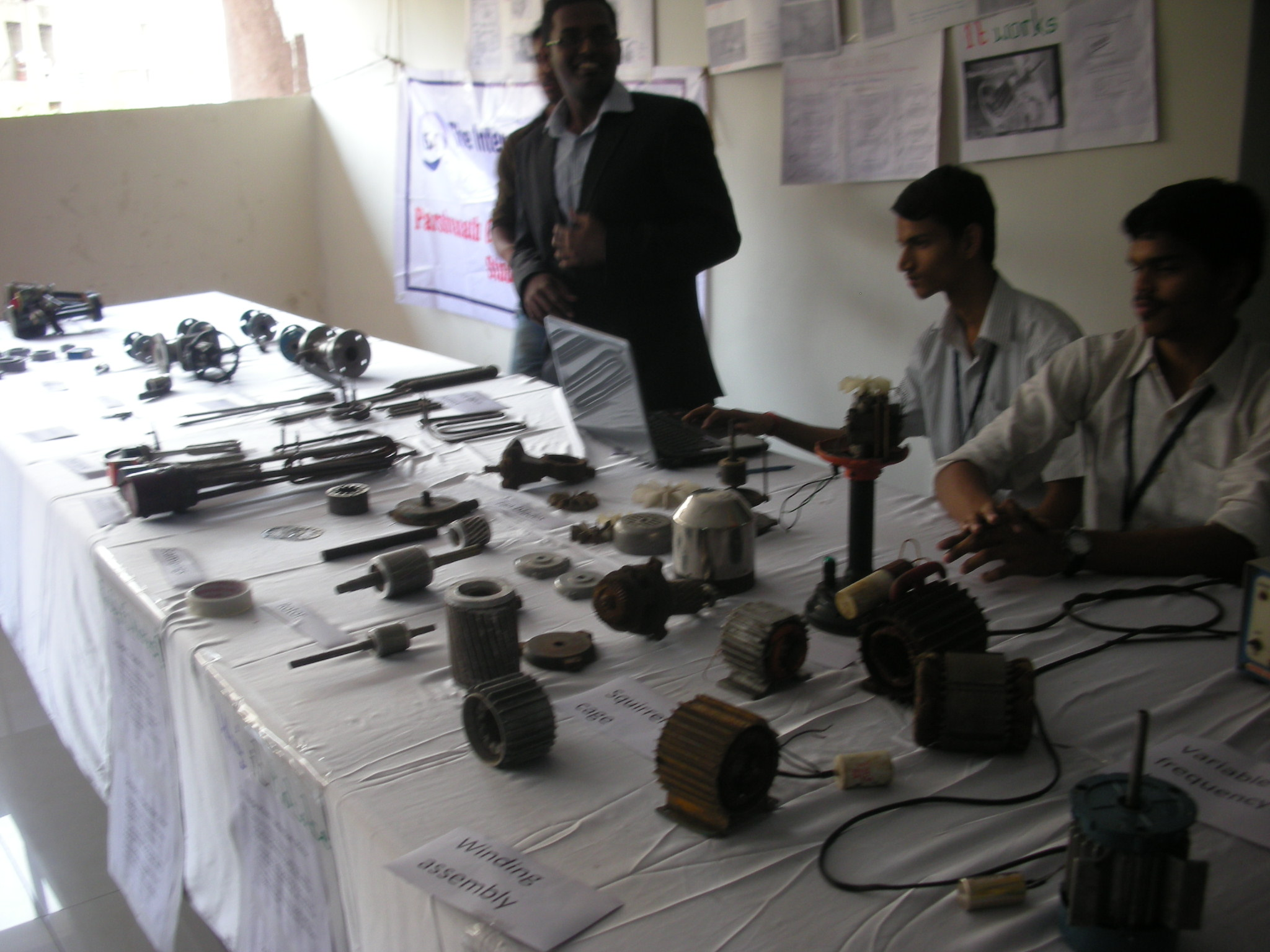
A technical exhibition at Avishkar 2012.

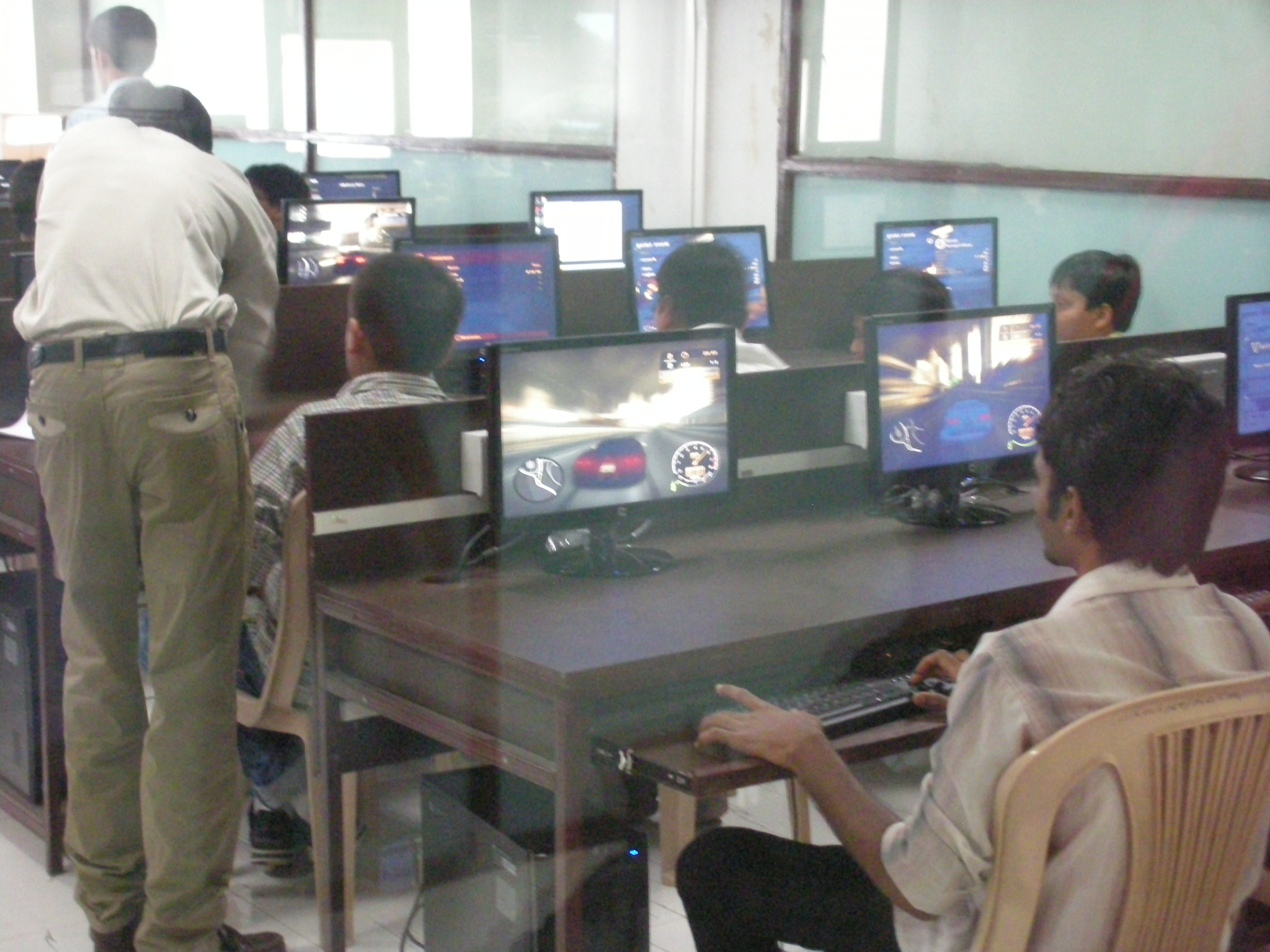
A LAN gaming event at Avishkar 2012.

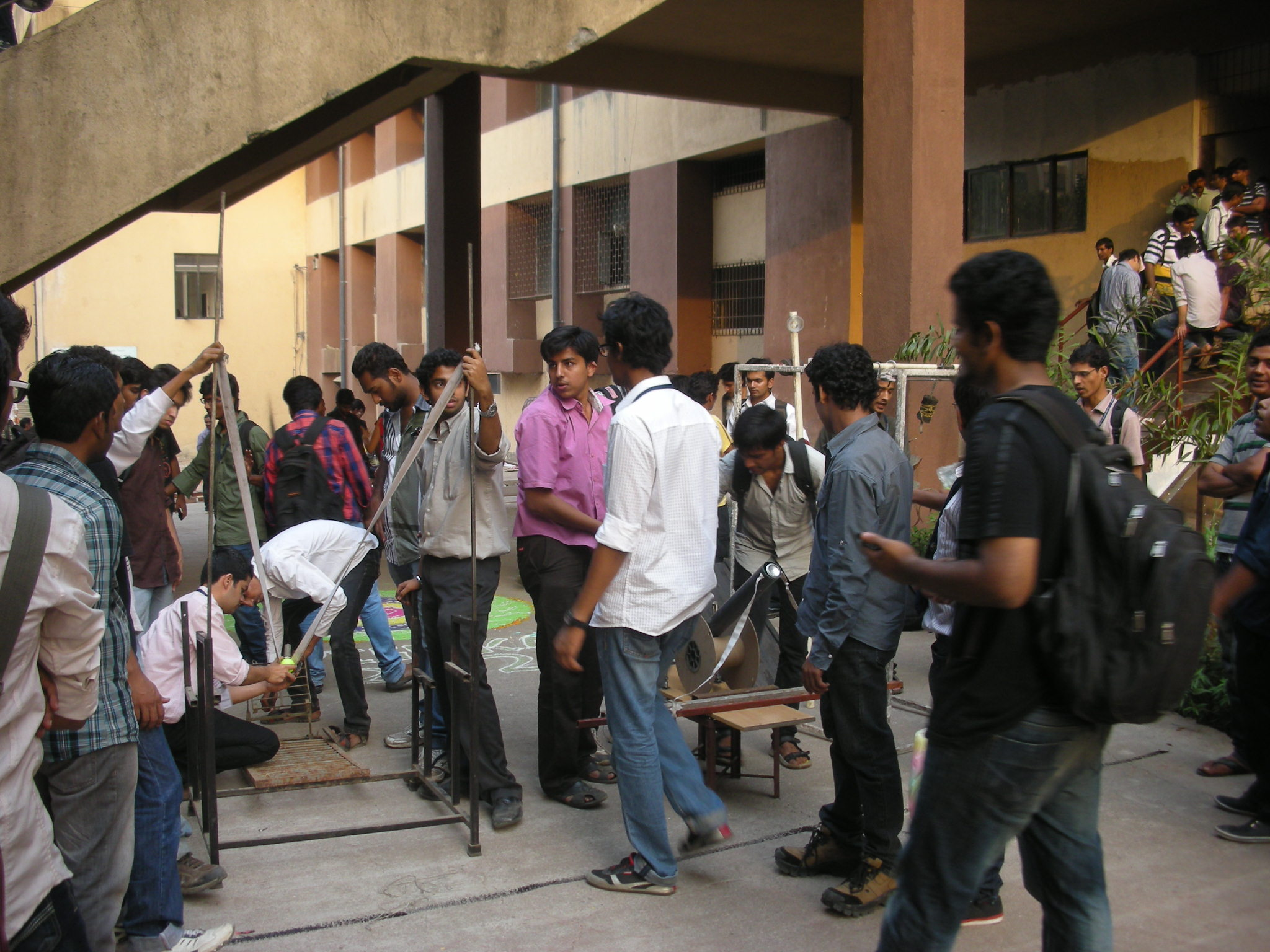
A scene from the "Junkyard Wars" competition at Avishkar 2012.

Annual cultural festival – Blitzkrieg

The college also had an annual cultural festival named "Blitzkrieg" (meaning "lightning war" in German). It included various events like debates, quizzes, rangoli-making contest, slow-biking "race", picture-gathering contest named "Picomania" (inspired from reality TV shows like The Amazing Race), singing, dancing and drama competitions, student fashion shows, etc. In 2012, there were two editions of the festival: an intra-college version hosted in February, followed by an inter-college version hosted in March.

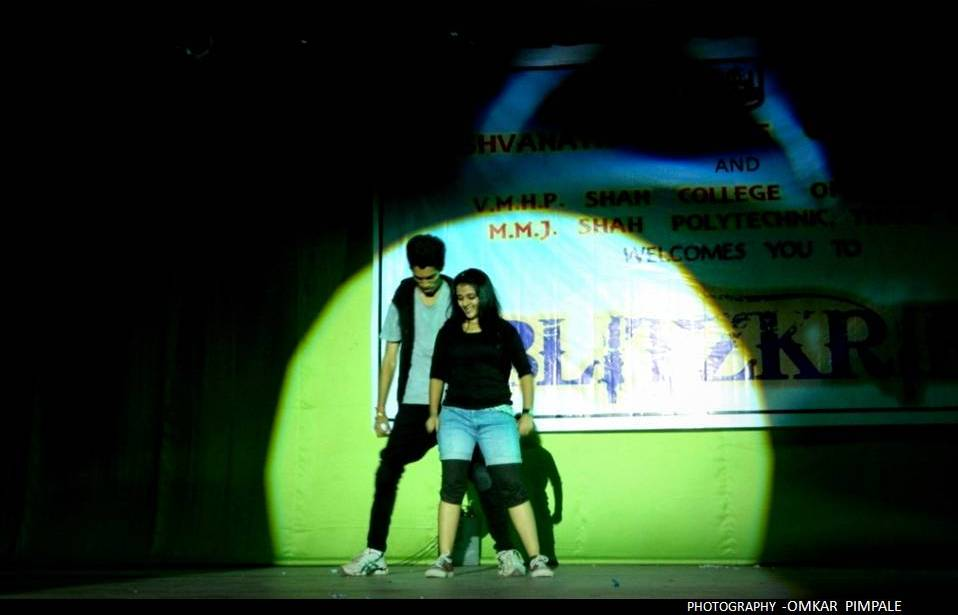
A performance at Blitzkrieg 2012 dance competition.

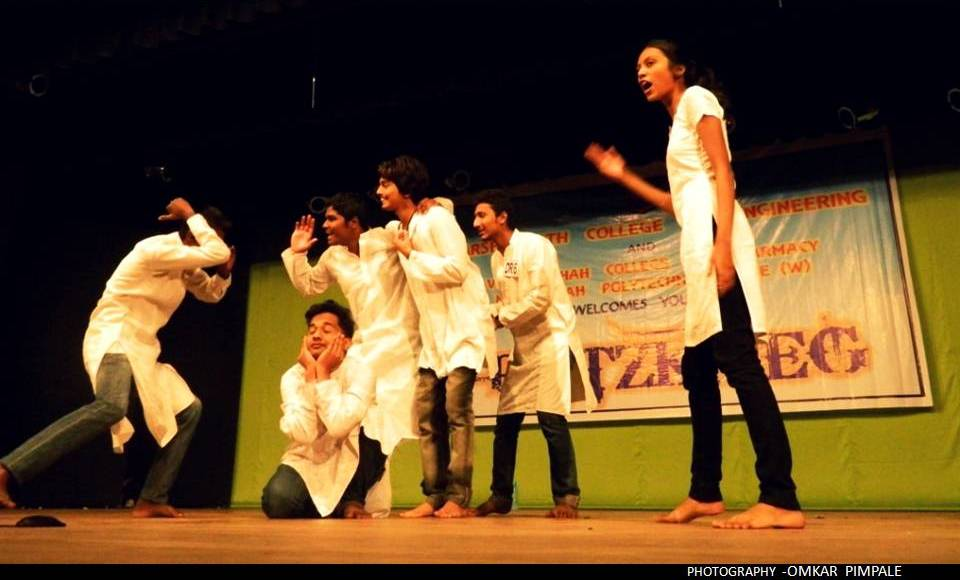
A performance at Blitzkrieg 2012 drama competition.

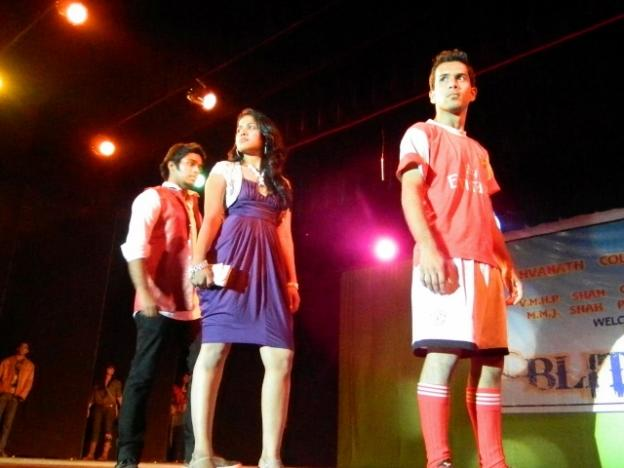
Students' fashion show at Blitzkrieg 2012.

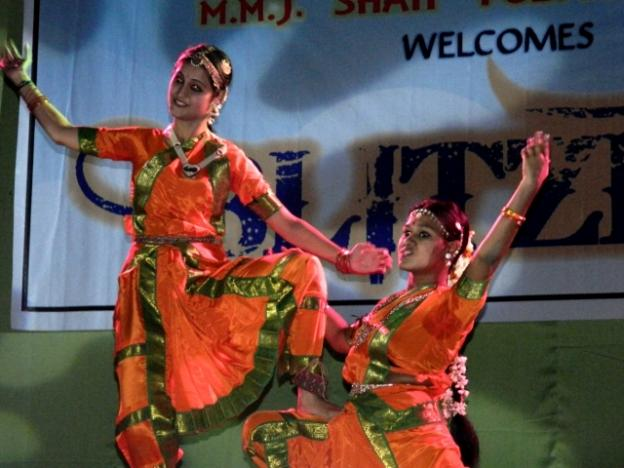
A dance performance at Blitzkrieg 2012.

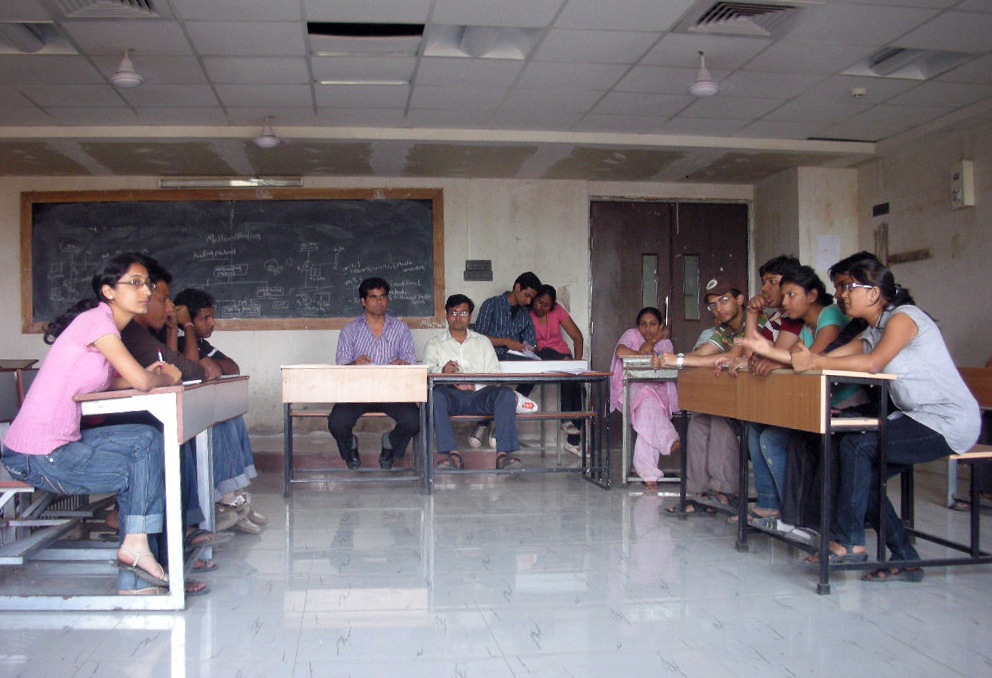
A debate competition at Blitzkrieg 2011.

College magazine – Zealous

In 2012, the work for the college magazine (named "Zealous") was initiated. It was envisioned to be a multilingual magazine, with student articles in 4 languages: English, Hindi, Marathi and Gujarati. The first issue was expected in the academic year 2012–2013. Articles had already been submitted and selected, and most of the magazine was ready for publishing. However, due to the uncertainty over the matter of the college being allowed to function, the actual publishing and printing of the magazine never happened.

== Library ==
The college library was equipped with 22843 books covering 5025 titles. It was spread over an area of about 400 square meters. The college was an associate member of INDEST AICTE Consortium, and had subscribed for 42 national and 21 international journals. The library was supported with on-line access for members.

The library had two reading rooms (one of which is air-conditioned), a reference section (for using books without taking them out of the library) and an internet surfing section for students and staff members.

Students could either take books for "reference" (returning them on the same day) or for "issue" (returning them after maximum duration of one week).

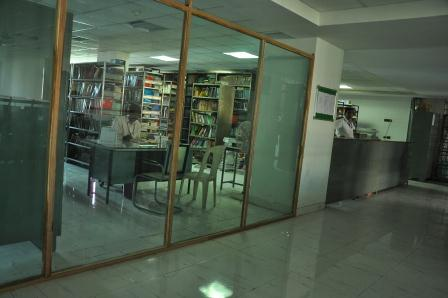
Old library arrangement.

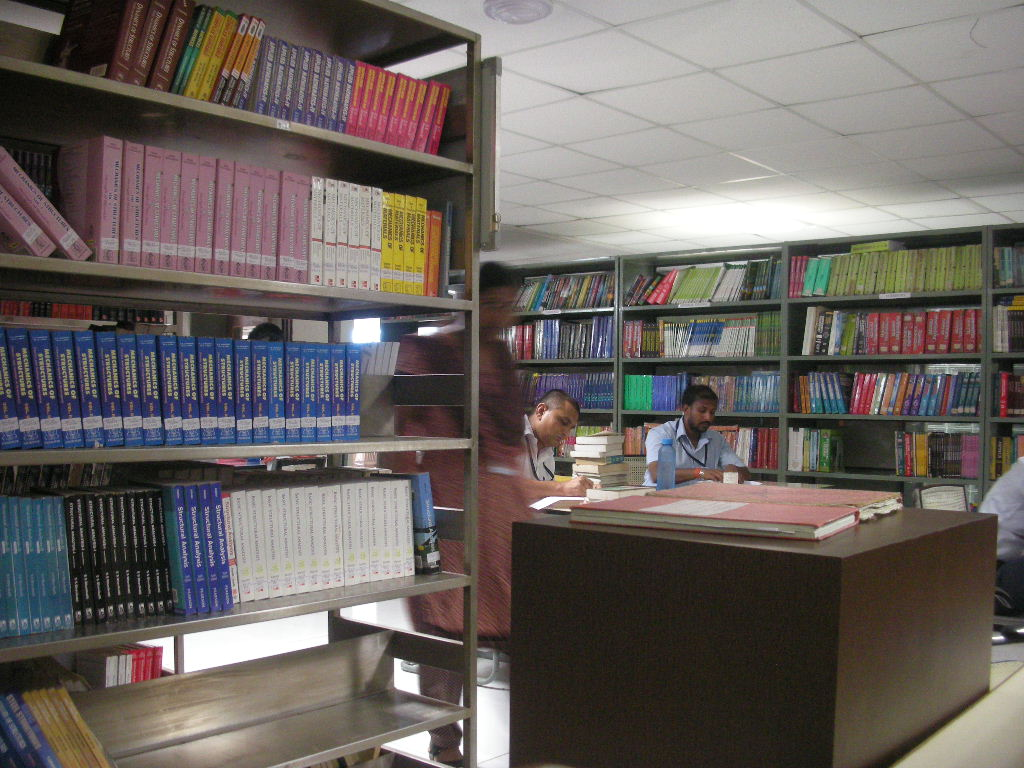
View from library counter.

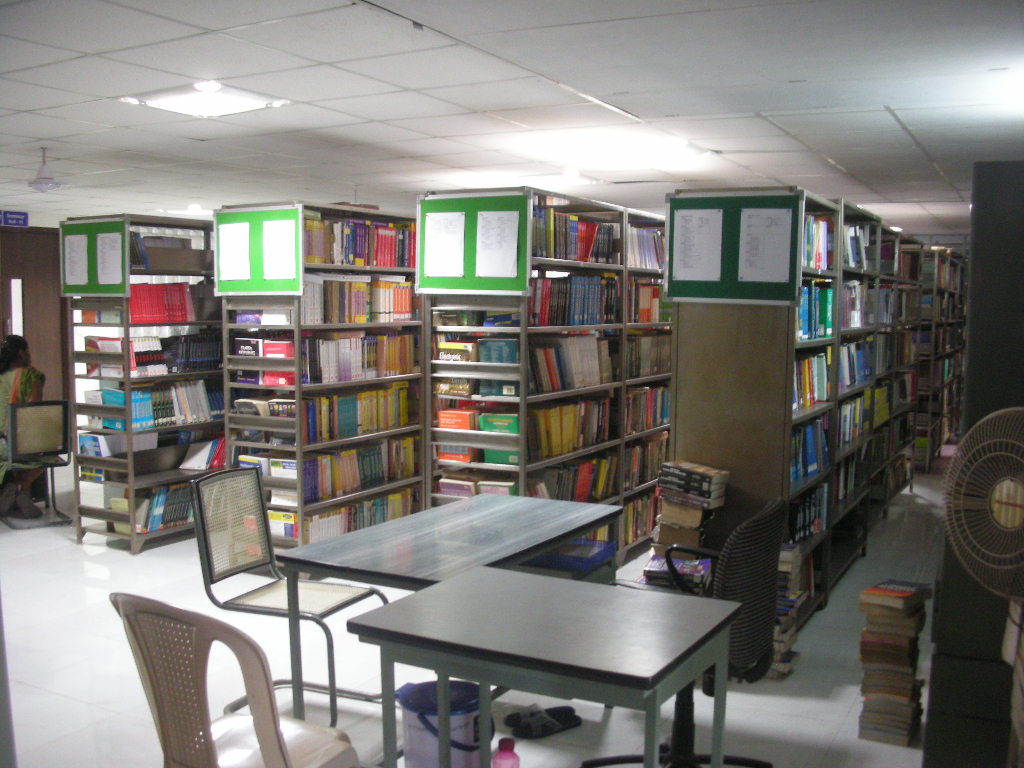
Book shelves at the library.

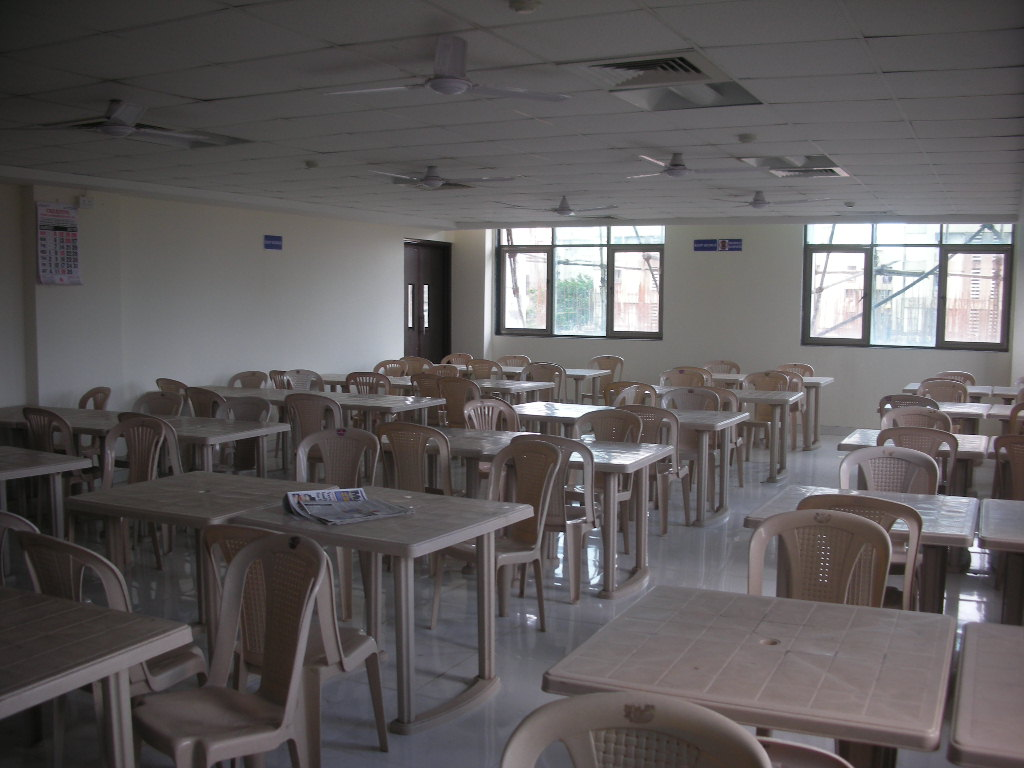
Reading room.

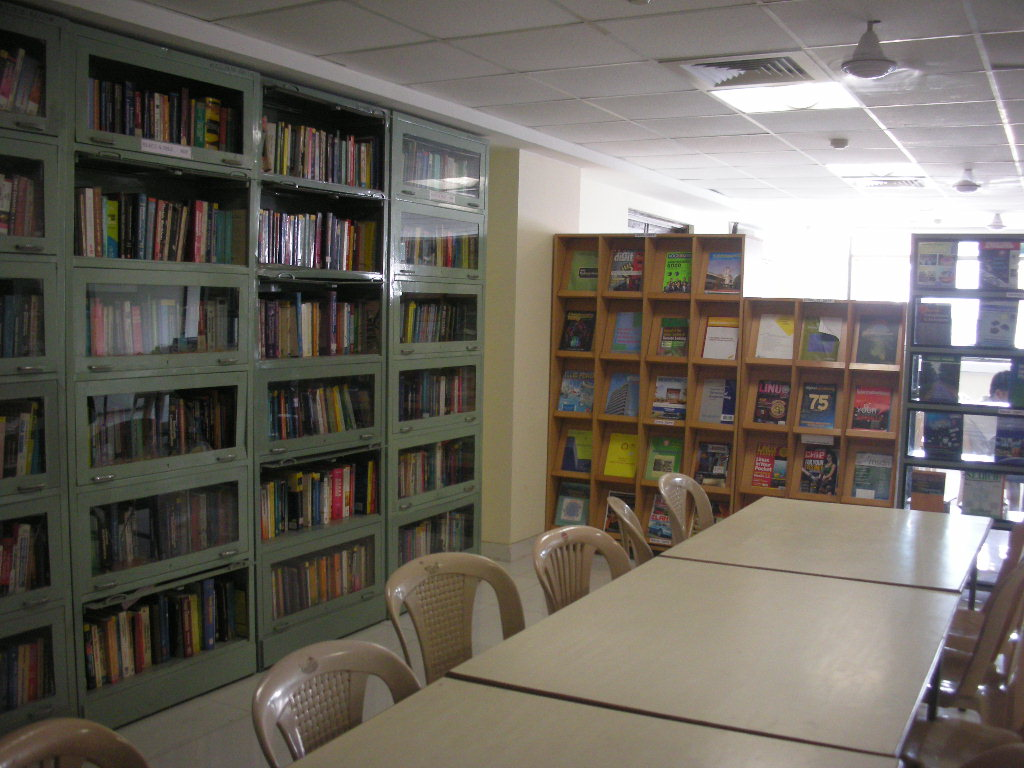
Reference section at the library.

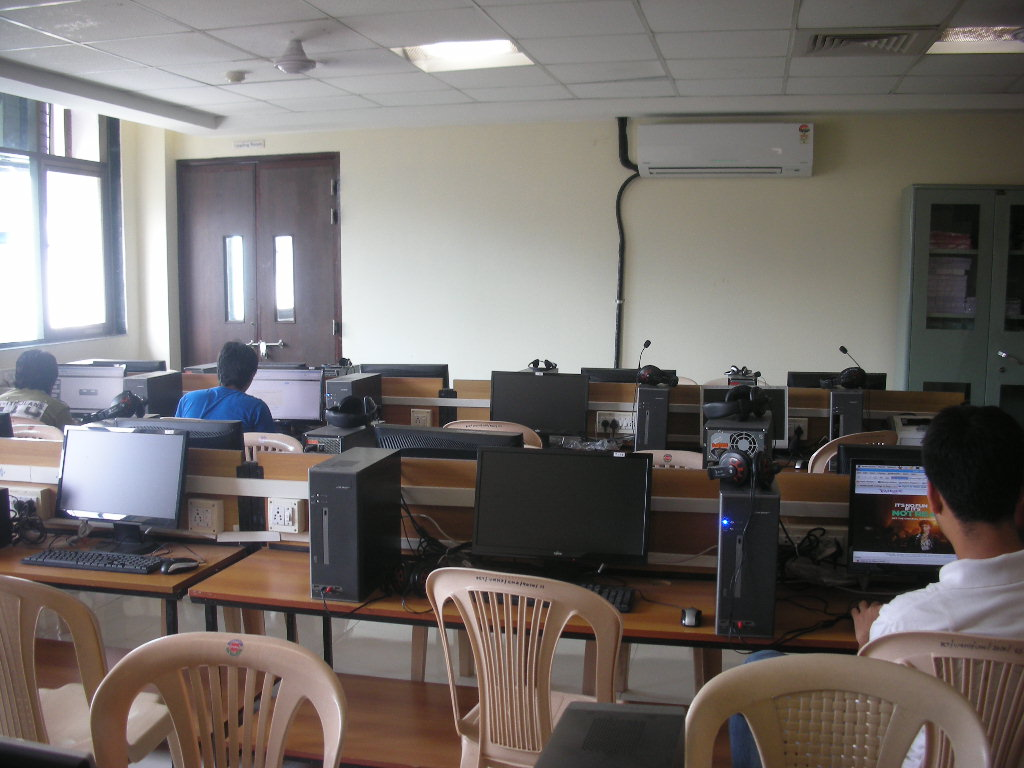
Internet access section at the library.

== Research and development cell ==
The college had a research and development cell aimed to promote and encourage the research & development activities of the teaching staff.

The R&D cell consisted of the committee of members which included the Principal, Vice-Principal, Dean of R&D cell, Head of every department, and interested faculty members of the departments.

Activities of the cell included:

- Undertaking of research projects of a group of faculty
- Undertaking of sponsored projects by industries as undergraduate projects
- Consultation offered by faculty members on problems faced by industries
- Organization of refresher courses for professionals from the industry
- Arranging lectures of experts from industry and funding agencies
- Recommending & forwarding for approval and financial aid from funding agencies for the project proposals submitted by faculty members

To improve the research and development orientation of faculty members as well as students, the decisions taken by the R&D cell included the following:

- To allow access to the laboratory after office hours so as to utilise the facilities optimally
- To allow access to library facilities after office hours on demand
- To grant funding for registering the participation in international or national engineering conferences and workshops

== Training and placement office ==
The college had a training and placement office to provide right career guidance to the students and helping them in selecting a proper career track. The office regularly conducted soft skill workshops and pre-placement training programmes. Computer labs were available for conducting pre-placement tests for around 300 students at a time.

== Issues ==
The college had faced some problems.

Academic and other issues

Technical and cultural college festivals were not regularly held every year.

The academic situation in the college was about average. Like in most engineering colleges of the University of Mumbai, most of the emphasis was on theory exams that constitute "external assessment" of the curriculum. "Internal assessment" components like practicals, as well as out-of-the-classroom experiences like industrial visits, were sometimes neglected. Many teaching staff members (including some heads of departments) possessed only bachelor's degrees in their disciplines. Only some had master's degrees, and very few had doctorates.

2010 – Strike of non-teaching staff; harassment case against vice-principal

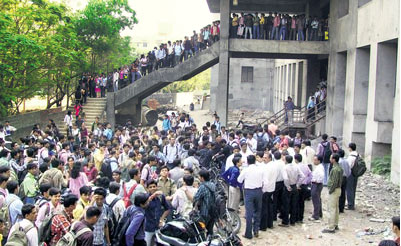
The college during the 2010 strike by the non-teaching staff.

In 2010, the non-teaching staff organised a strike against the management (headed by then trustee of Parshvanath Charitable Trust – Mr. Tekchand Shah) for non-payment of their salaries. Due to the strike, classes were not held for several days. At the same time, the political party Maharashtra Navnirman Sena's local branch also held a movement on college campus against then vice-principal and applied chemistry lecturer Mr. S. D. Shah for alleged harassment of some female students and staff members. The students also protested against certain aspects of the college that made student life difficult. For example: absence of basic facilities like ceiling fans in classrooms, canteen for the college, etc.; certain college rules like students not being allowed to wear T-shirts (and punishments like college IDs being confiscated, fines of Rs 100 or more being imposed on students not obeying these rules, or found loitering outside class during lecture/practical hours). The events led to the arrest (and later release on bail) of Mr. S. D. Shah, change of the PCT trustee from Mr. Teckchand Shah to Mr. Ashok Bhai Shah, and change of the college principal from Dr. Ram Reddy to Dr. Uttam D. Kolekar. In the transition process, the college was managed by the state government of Maharashtra. Mr. S. D. Shah has not been working in the college since his arrest.

Under the new management, the college's situation improved considerably, with all essential facilities being provided to the students and staff members. Inappropriate college rules (e.g. T-shirts not being allowed) were revoked.

2010 admission hiccup

During the 2010 admissions, the college was initially not allowed to participate in the Centralized Admission Process (CAP) (of undergraduate engineering admissions in Maharashtra) managed by the Directorate of Technical Education (DTE) of Maharashtra state. However, after a special meeting of college management and staff representatives with the state's Higher and Technical Education minister Mr. Rajesh Tope, the college was subsequently allowed to participate in DTE's 2010 CAP from Round 2.

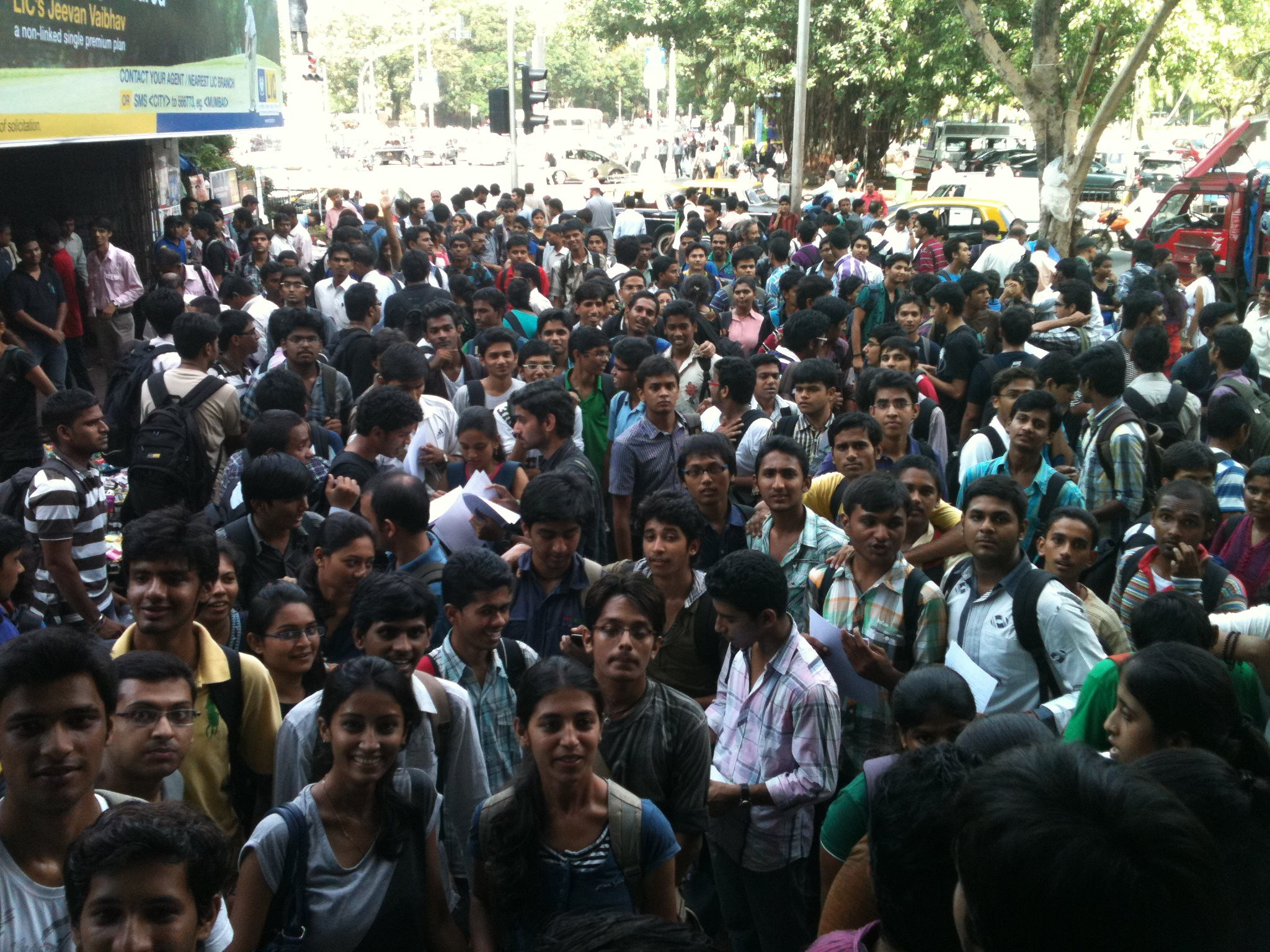
PCoE students and staff at AICTE's Mumbai Regional Office on 24 August 2012.

2012 – Non-extension of AICTE approval, cases in courts, closing down of college

The All India Council for Technical Education (AICTE) attempted to de-recognize the college in the 2010–2011 academic year, after which the college management went to court seeking a stay on the order for a year. The college got the stay, and later also managed to get it extended for the academic year 2011–2012. However, when it tried to do the same for the 2012–2013 academic year, the Bombay High Court refused and upheld the AICTE's order in a ruling on 22 August 2012. The AICTE had not granted the Extension of Approval to continue the undergraduate courses in the college, (thus halting its first-year admissions in the DTE-managed CAP rounds of 2012) and had directed the college to shut down immediately, transferring the current students to other engineering colleges of the University of Mumbai. An "expert committee" of the AICTE visited the college for inspection on 6 August 2012, and after inspection it gave a "zero deficiency" report regarding the college infrastructure, facilities, etc. But even then, AICTE did not change its decision of derecognising the college. The Yuva Sena (youth wing of the Shiv Sena political party) protested the AICTE decision at the Mumbai regional office of the AICTE. A contentious issue in the matter of the college not being allowed to function was the college not possessing the required Occupancy Certificate from the Thane Municipal Corporation. But on 27 August 2012, the college obtained the Occupancy Certificate, and then challenged the High Court ruling by appealing in the Supreme Court of India. The hearing was expected on 29 August 2012, but it was postponed to 4 September 2012 due to late availability of the High Court order copy. Classes, examinations and other works continued at the college till December 2012, when the Supreme Court issued its verdict in favour of AICTE. Thus, PCoE had to be closed down and all current students were transferred (by the Directorate of Technical Education of the state Government of Maharashtra) to other engineering colleges of the University of Mumbai. But the Supreme Court also imposed a fine of Rs 50,000 on AICTE for the delay of two years (2008–2009 and 2009–2010) in its initiative to investigate the case of the college (under the previous trustee Mr. Tekchand Shah) shifting campuses without following proper procedures.

== Opening of new engineering college on the same campus ==
The Parshvanath Charitable Trust (PCT) wanted to start, from the academic year 2014–205, a new engineering college named A. P. Shah Institute of Technology, affiliated to the University of Mumbai, on the same campus (on east side of Ghodbunder Road) where the Parshvanath College of Engineering once operated. To grant approval, the AICTE had sought, among other documents, a certificate in a particular format from the sub-divisional magistrate or collector or tehsildar. The format was the certification that "the land and the building are fit to be used for running a technical institution". But the tehsildar's office claimed that the land stood in the name of M/s Key Tech. It also stated that it was not the competent authority to issue a certificate as prescribed by the AICTE as per the rules. Since PCT failed to submit the required certificate, its application was rejected by the AICTE. PCT then moved the Bombay High Court. The court ruled in PCT's favour, saying that since the trust was not at fault for not producing the certificate, the AICTE should process its application without it. The trust was then asked to submit an affidavit stating the conditions in the certificate.

But the Bombay High Court did not express any opinion on whether PCT has complied with all other conditions of setting up an institute. It has also clarified that "in the event of the AICTE finding that the petitioners have not complied with any of the requirements in the said certificate (in the affidavit), the approval, if granted, may be cancelled".

Eventually, PCT got all the required clearances, and opened the new college from the 2014–2015 academic year, admitting students to the first year.

== Gallery ==
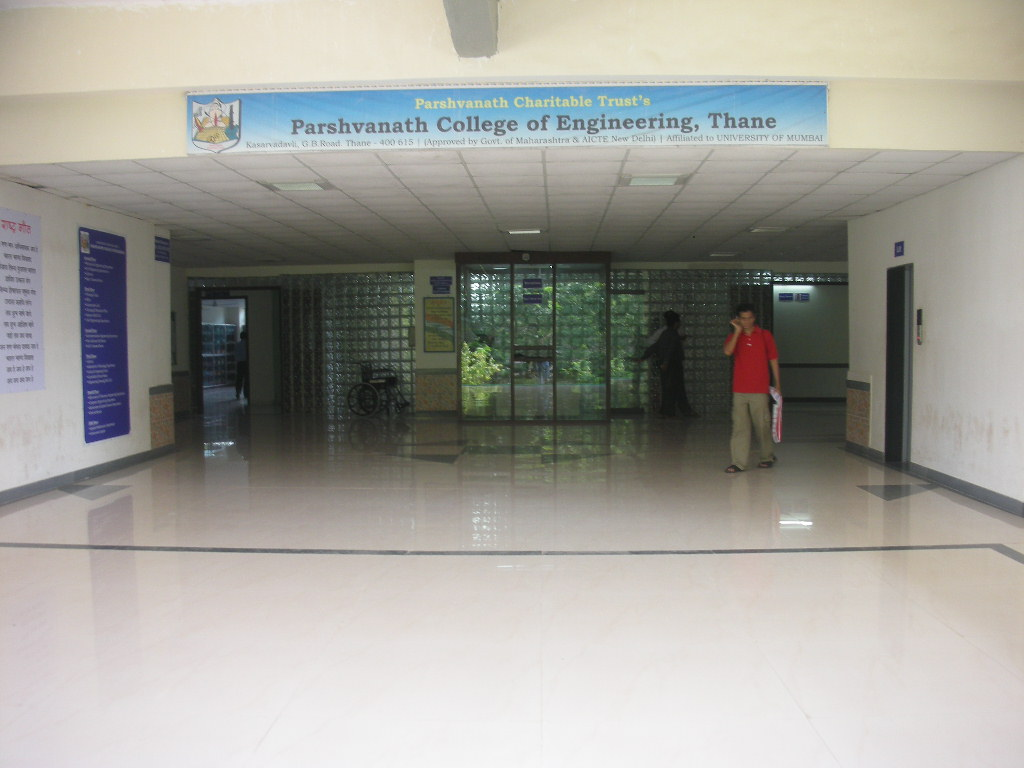
View from first floor entry.

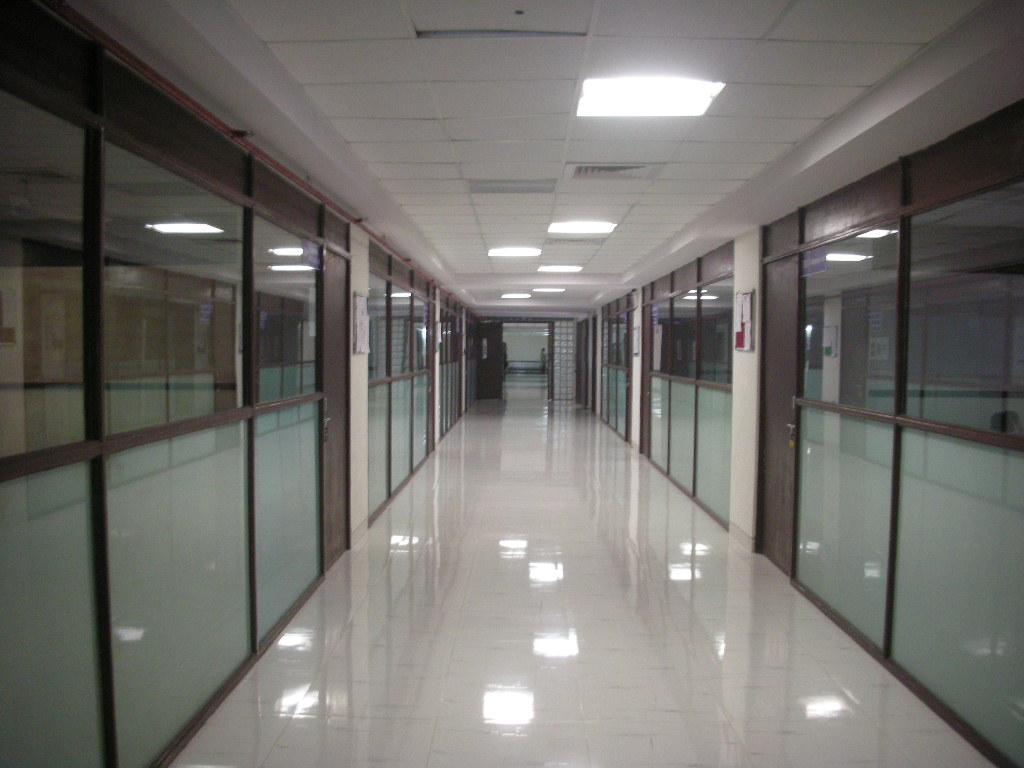
Central computing facility corridor.

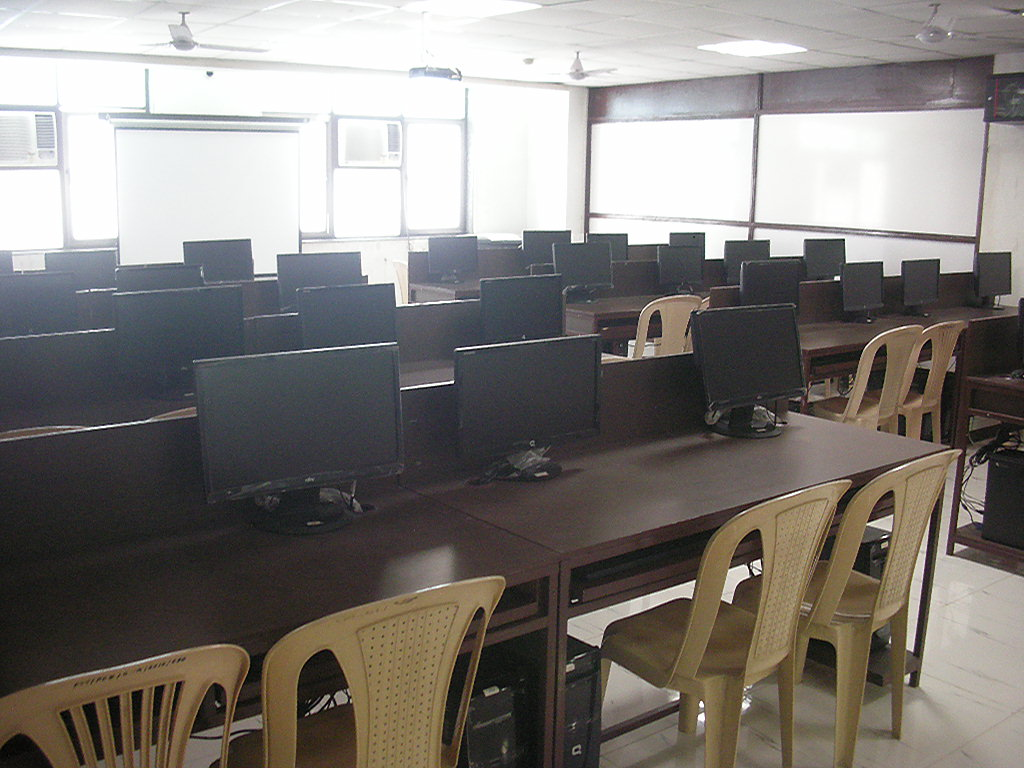
A computer lab.

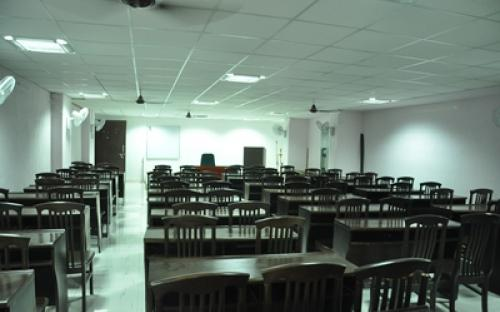
A seminar hall.

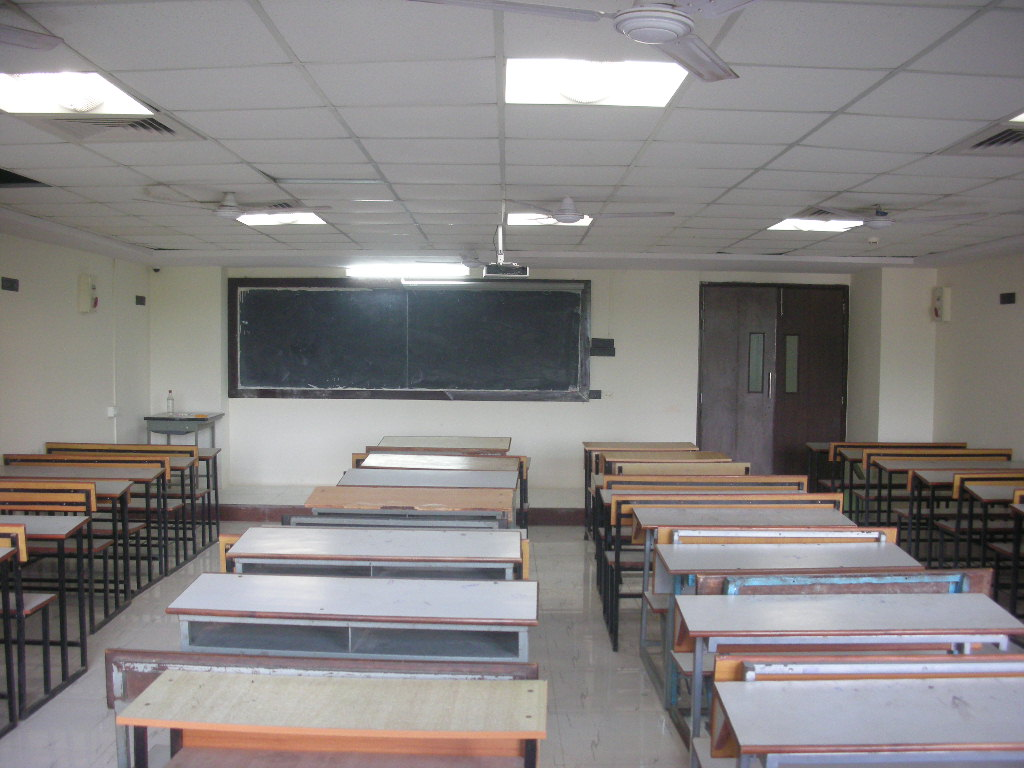
A classroom.

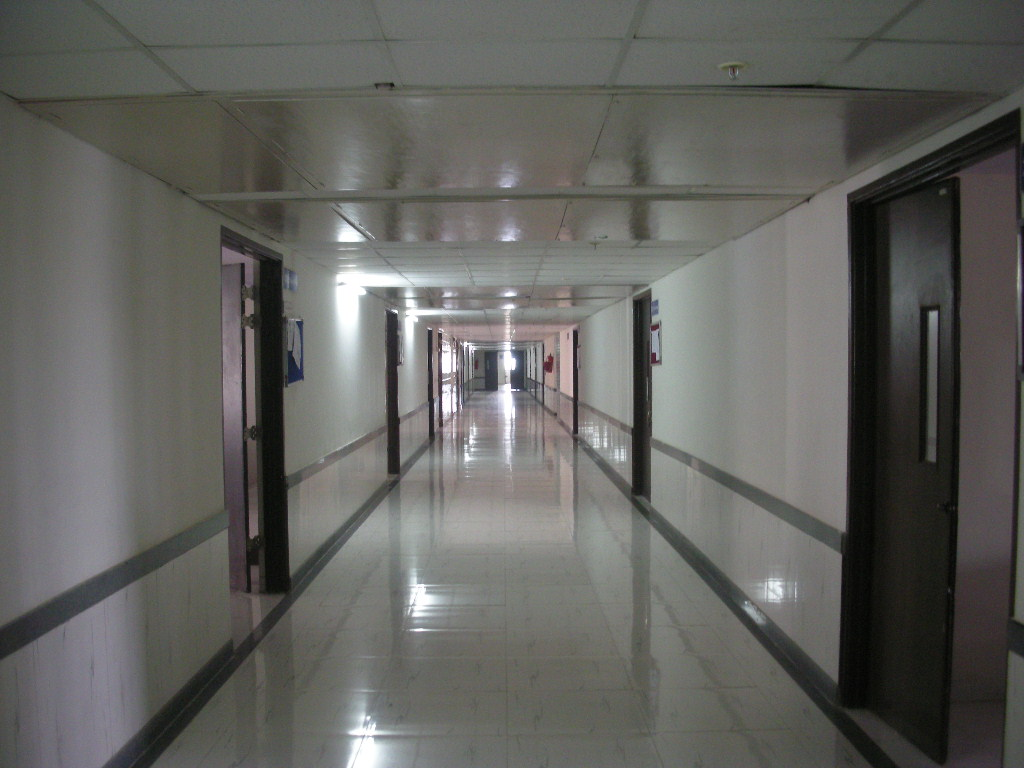
Corridor on the second floor.

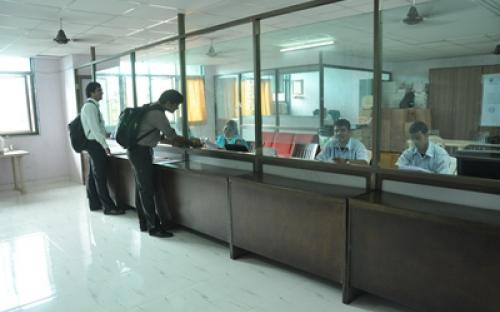
Administrative office.

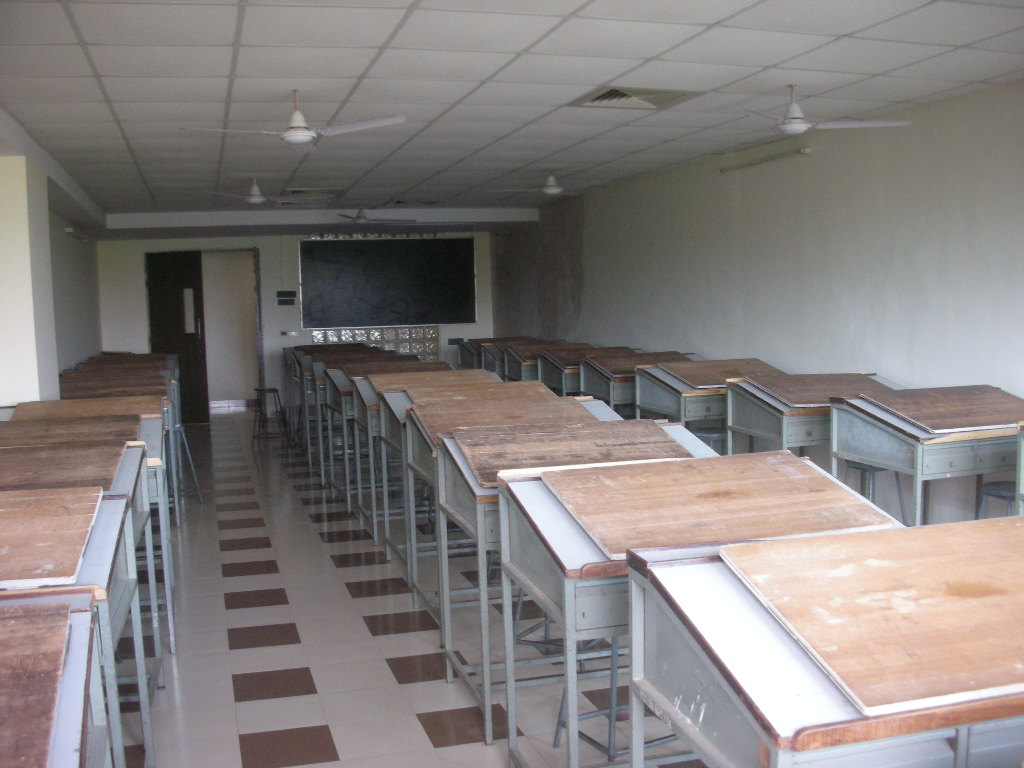
A drawing hall.

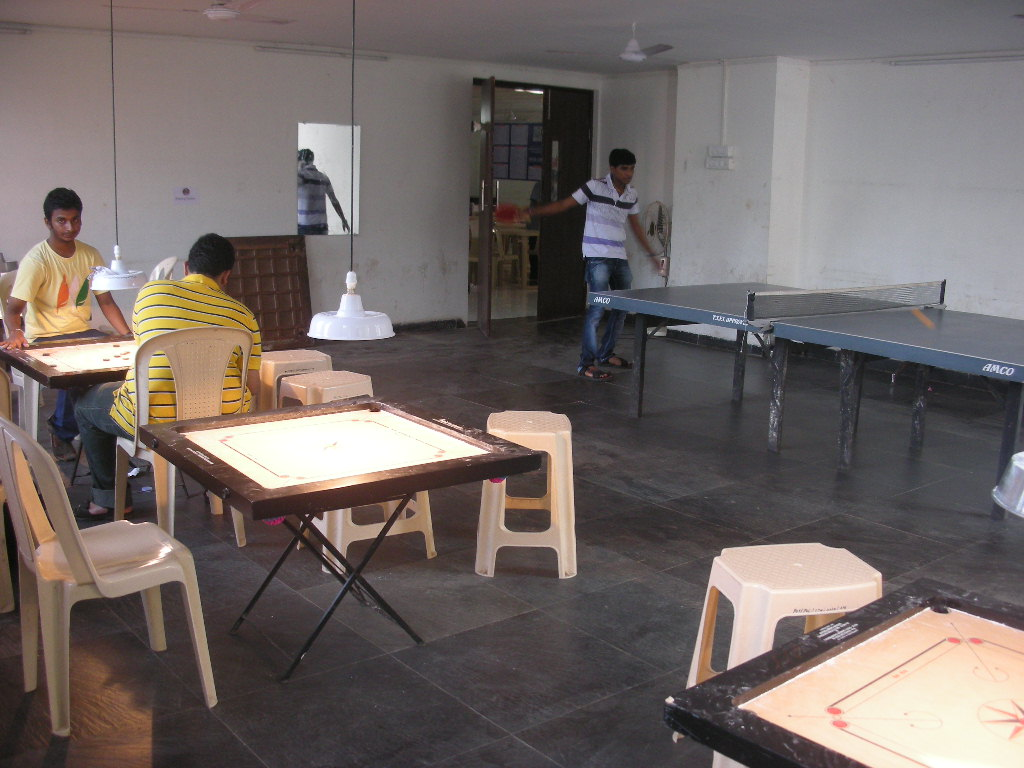
Boys' common room.

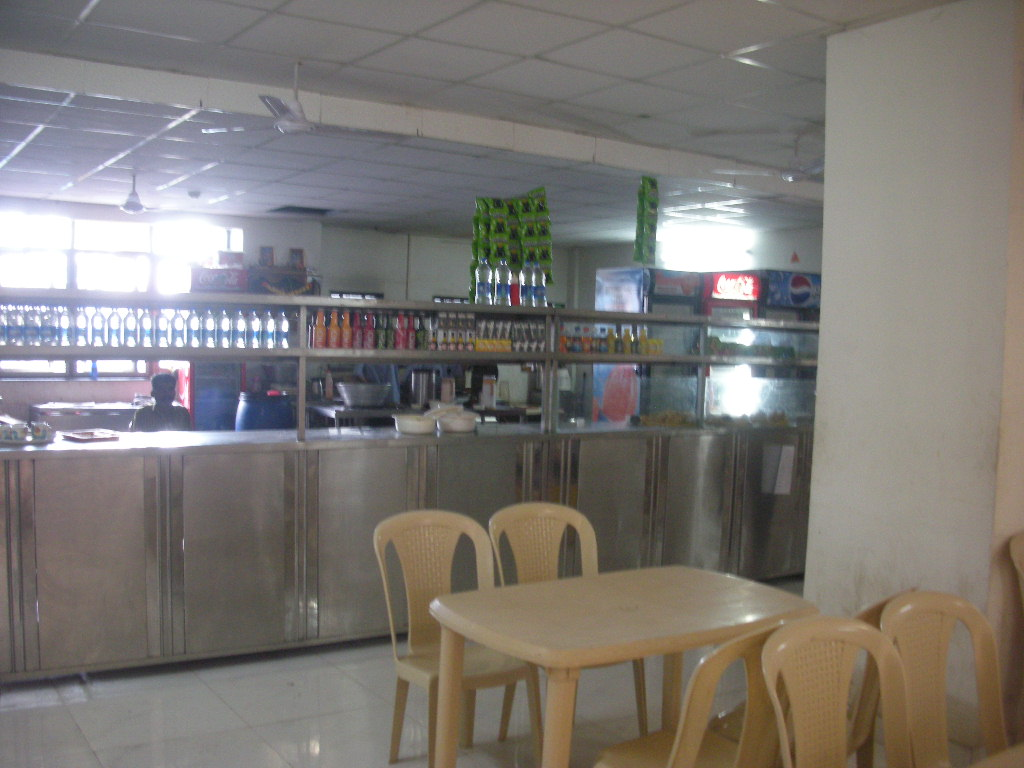
Canteen.

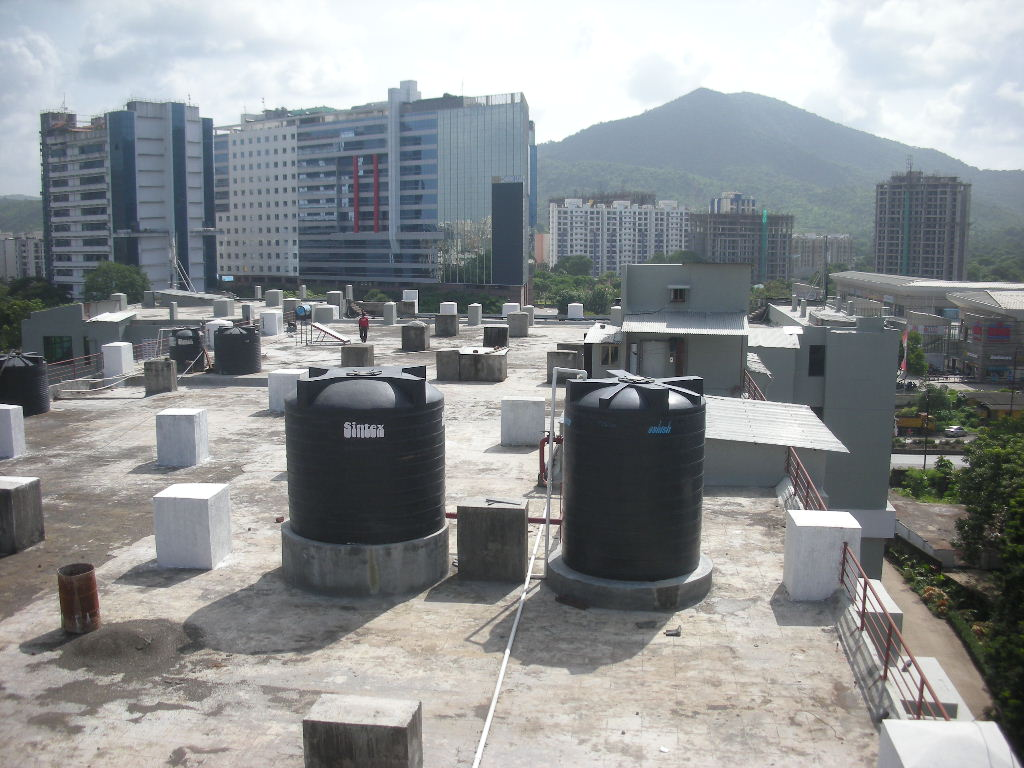
A view from the college terrace.

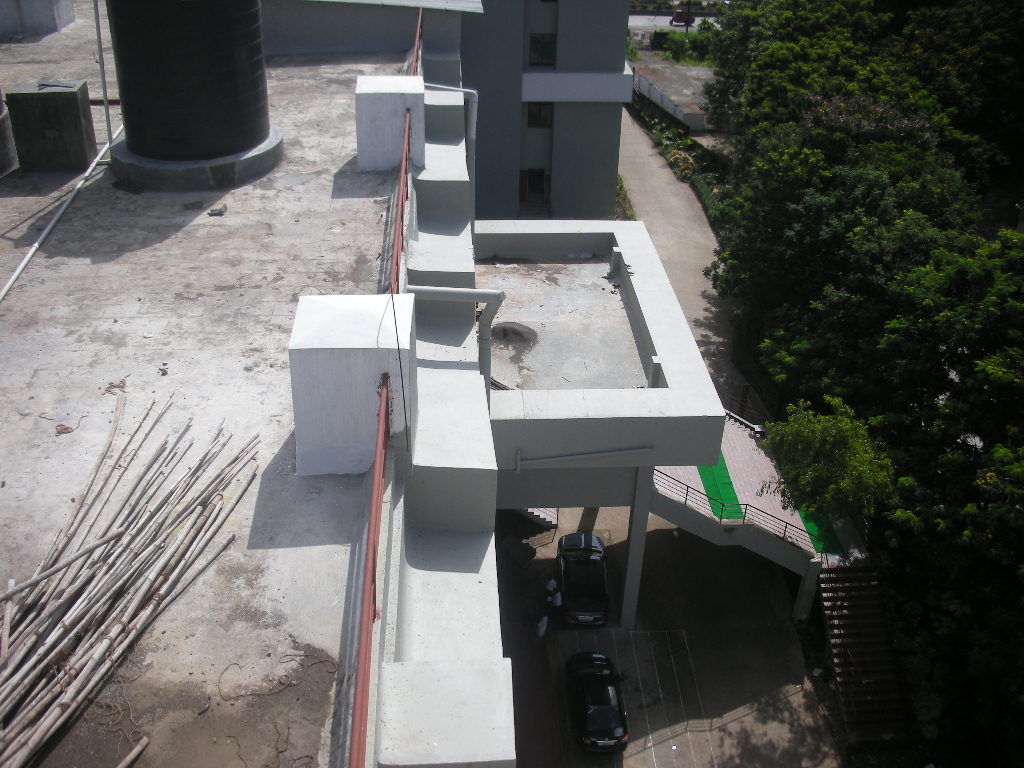
Another view from the college terrace.

== See also ==
- A. P. Shah Institute of Technology
