= A. P. Shah Institute of Technology =

Private engineering college in Kasarvadavali, Thane

Coordinates: 19°16′05.29″N 72°58′02.89″E

- Type: Private Undergraduate Engineering College
- Established: 2014
- Affiliations: University of Mumbai
- Chairman: Chirag A. Shah
- Principal: Dr. Uttam Kolekar
- Head: Prof. Atul Kulkarni
- Academic staff: 90
- Administrative staff: 150
- Students: 300 (per year)
- Undergraduates: 2000
- Location: Kasarvadavali, Ghodbunder Road, Thane, Maharashtra, India
- Campus: Urban
- Nickname: APSITians
- Accreditation and recognition: All India Council for Technical Education; Directorate of Technical Education, Maharashtra; National Board of Accreditation
- Website: apsit.edu.in/

A. P. Shah Institute of Technology (APSIT) is a private engineering college located in Kasarvadavali, Thane. It was established in 2014 and is managed by the Parshvanath Charitable Trust.

It is a Jain religious minority College (i.e., 51% of all seats are reserved for students from the Jain religious minority community) and is affiliated to the University of Mumbai (a public university, funded by the state government of Maharashtra). The college is approved by the Indian Government's All India Council for Technical Education (AICTE) and is recognized by the Directorate of Technical Education (DTE) of the state Government of Maharashtra.

== Academics ==
A. P. Shah Institute of Technology provides Bachelor of Engineering (B.E.) degree in Civil engineering, Computer engineering, Computer Science and Engineering (Artificial Intelligence and Machine Learning), Computer Science and Engineering (Data Science), Information Technology, and Mechanical engineering. College also has various minor degrees which are aligned with the major degree, they include Cyber Security, Internet of Things (IoT), 3D Printing,Industrial Automation Infrastructure Engineering & Smart Cities, Green Technology and Sustainability Engineering, etc. All of these courses last for 4 years.

== Student activities ==
College offers a vibrant student life focused on technical innovation, cultural expression, and social responsibility.

Key Student Activities & Clubs:

- Ojus is the annual cultural/sports festival featuring music, dance, fashion and gaming. It is also a platform where students showcase Innovative projects.
- Technical Clubs & Associations: Various departments maintain student bodies like the AI & ML Student Association (AIML SA), Data Science Student Association (DSA), Cybersecurity/Blockchain Club and Maths and Applied Sciences Club (MASC) that organize hackathons and coding competitions.
- Antarang Club: Club focused on Mental health & awareness among the students.
- Professional Bodies: Active chapters of AWS, IEEE, CSI, Google Developer Group (GDG), ISHRE, and IGBC provide industry interaction.
- National Service Scheme Unit: Focuses on community service, rural development, and environmental awareness.

== Gallery ==
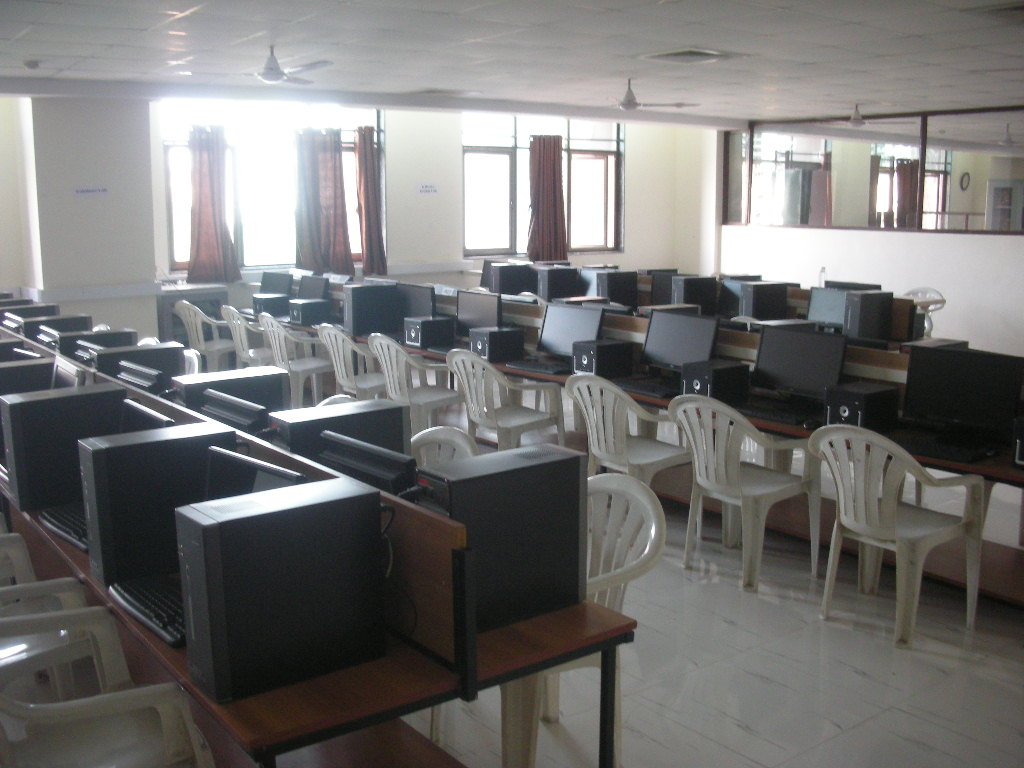
A computer lab.

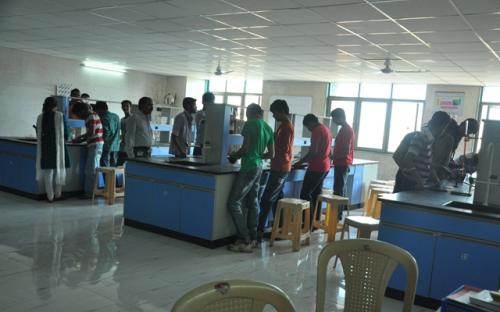
Students at the applied chemistry laboratory of the college

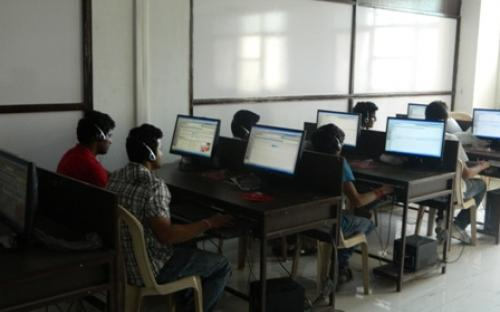
Students at the language laboratory (for the subjects of "communication skills" and "presentation & communication techniques")

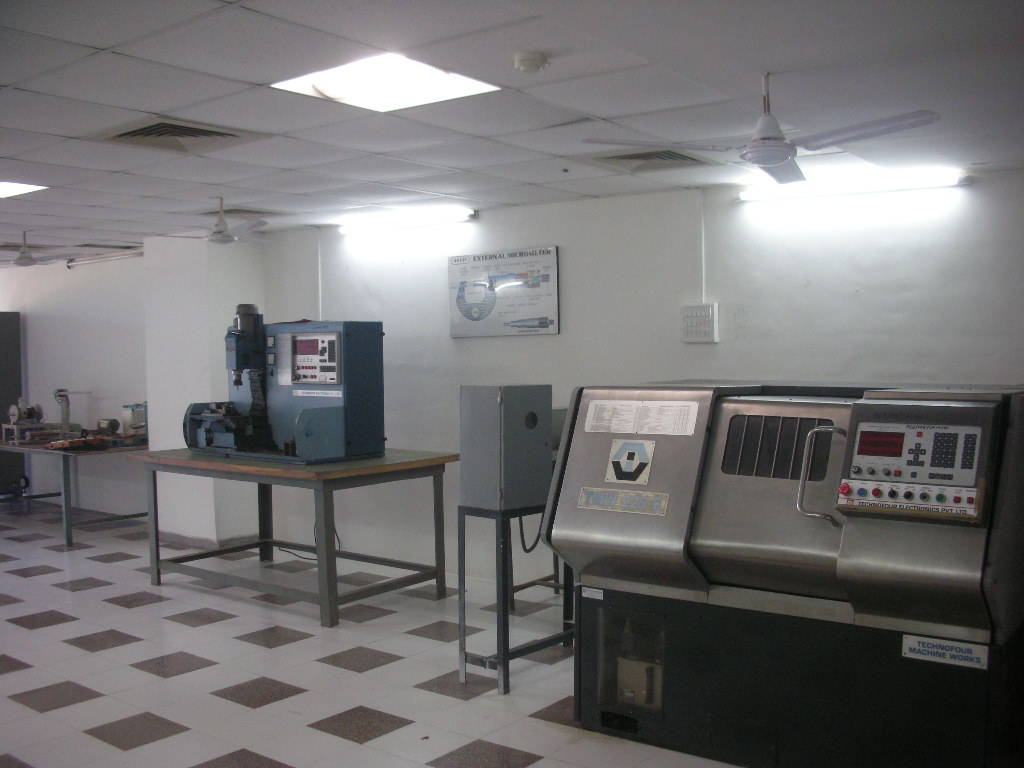
Lab for "Material Technology", "Computer-Aided Manufacturing" and "Mechanical Measurements and Metrology".

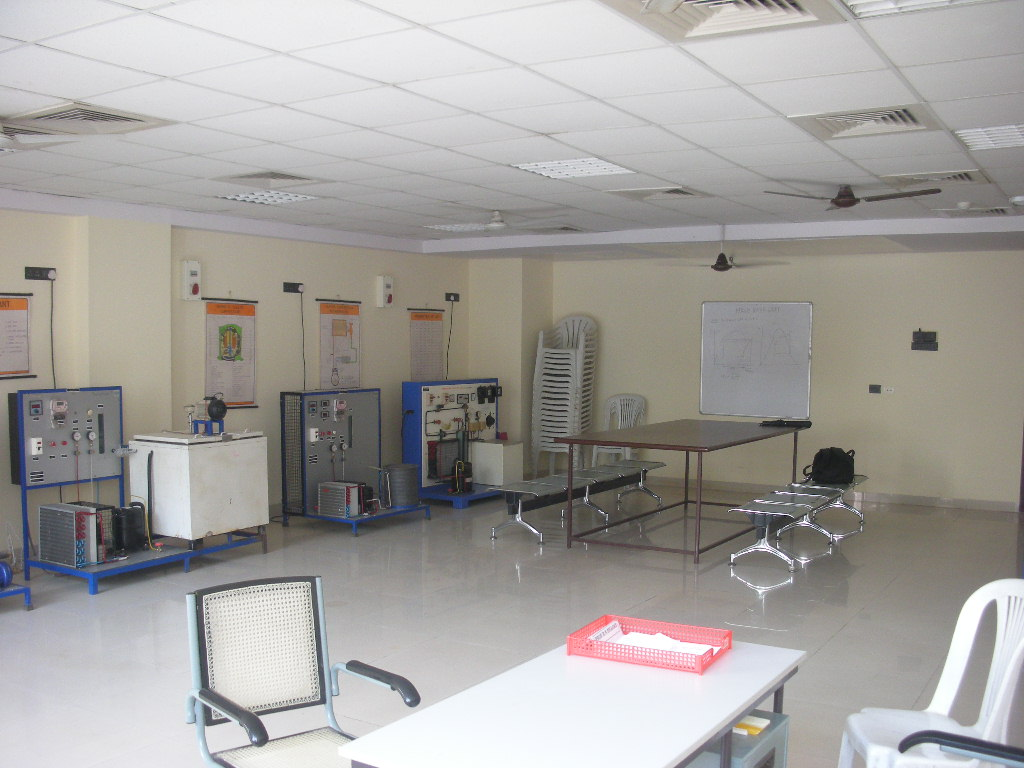
Refrigeration and Air-conditioning lab.

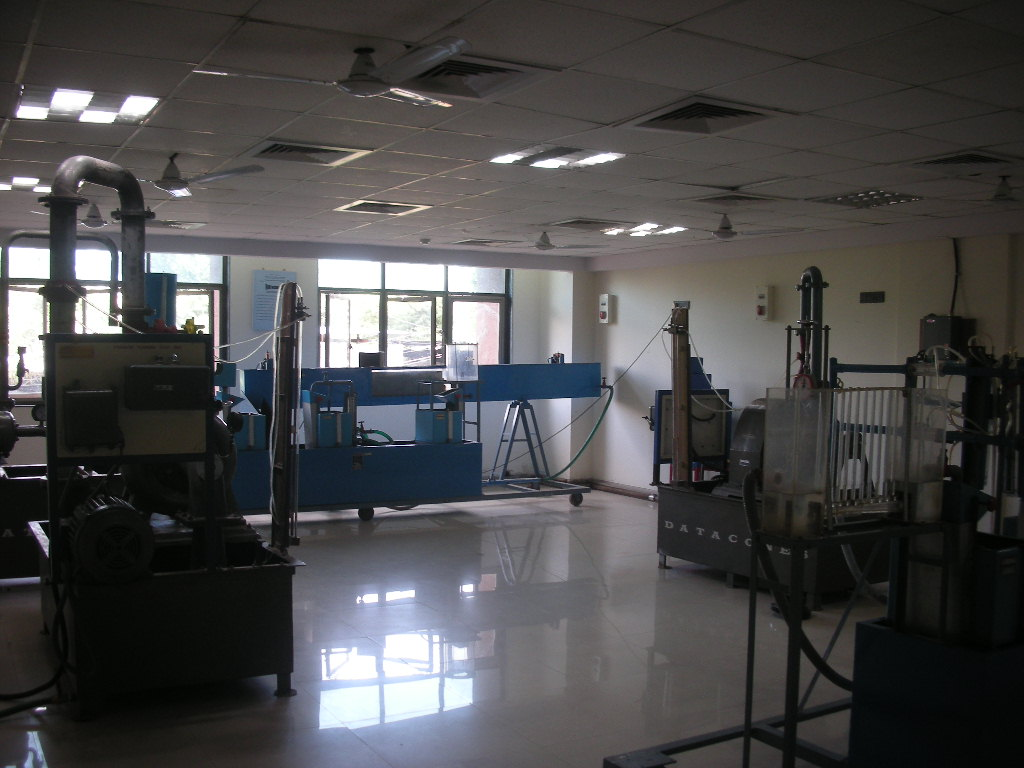
Fluid Mechanics and Hydraulic Machinery lab.

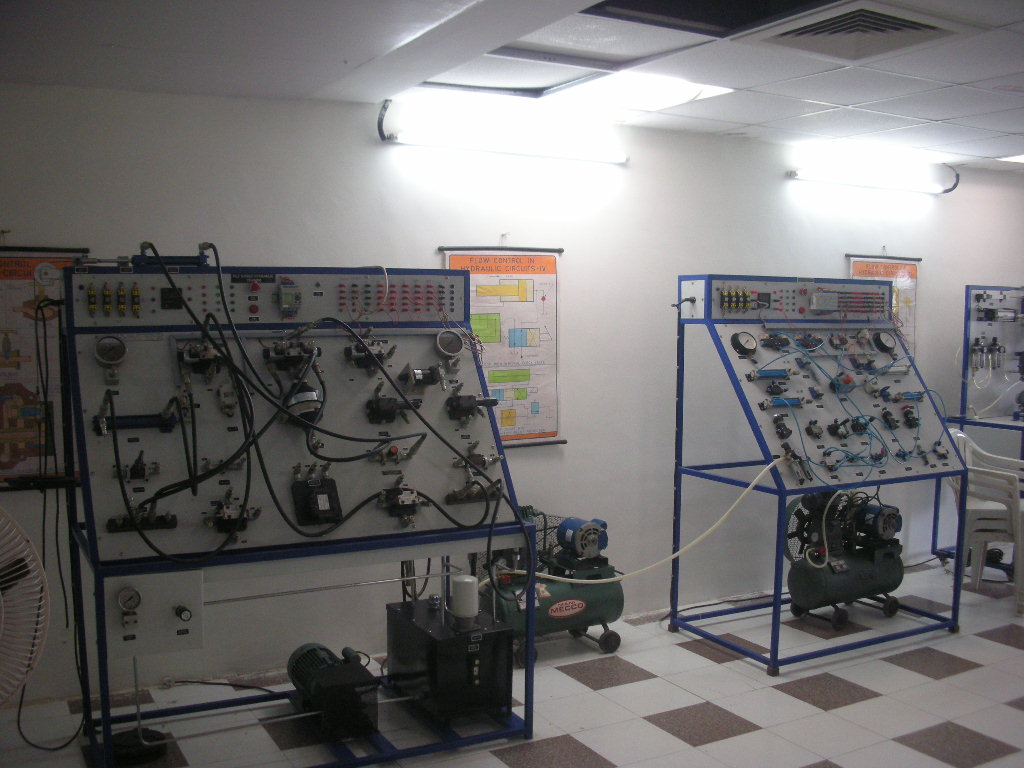
Mechatronics lab.

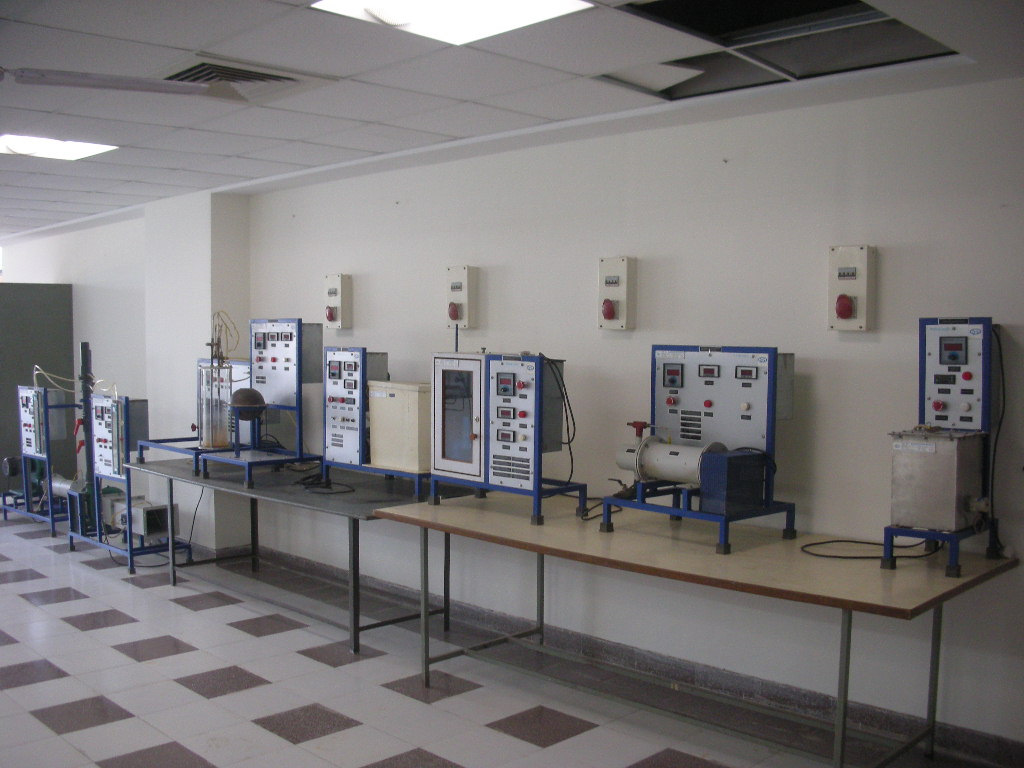
Heat and Mass Transfer lab.

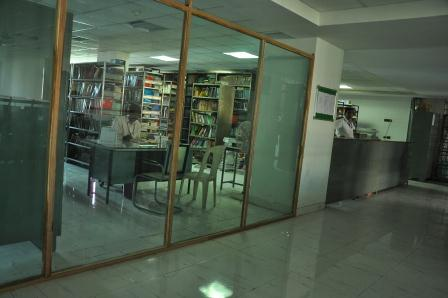
Old library arrangement.

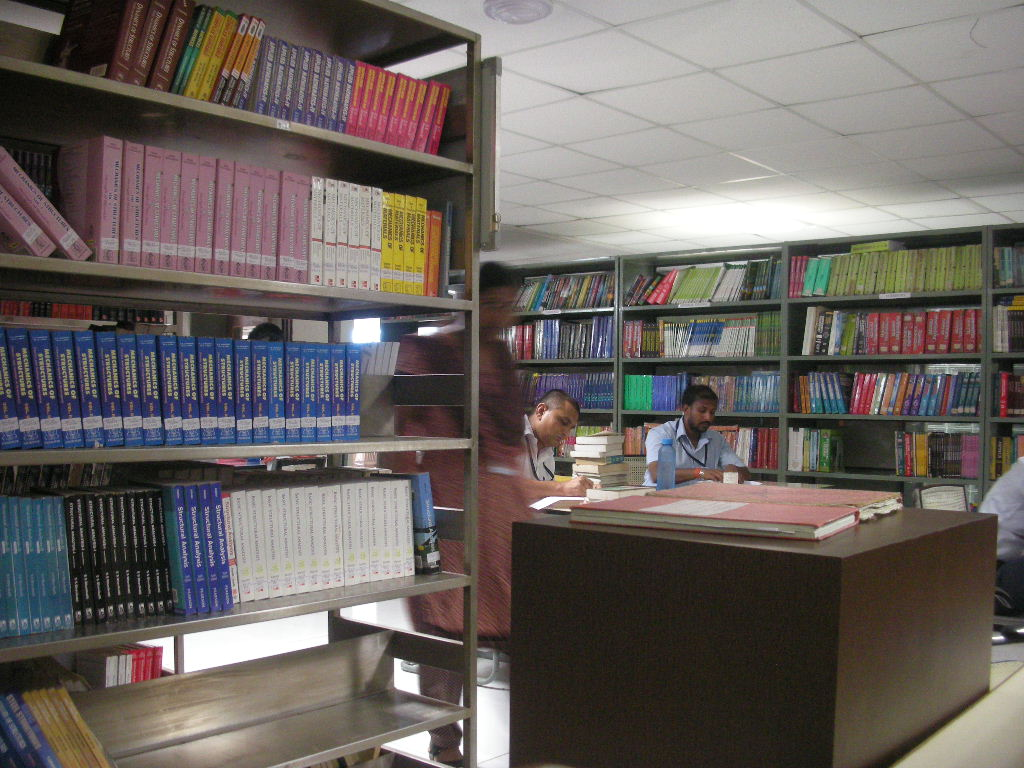
View from the library counter.

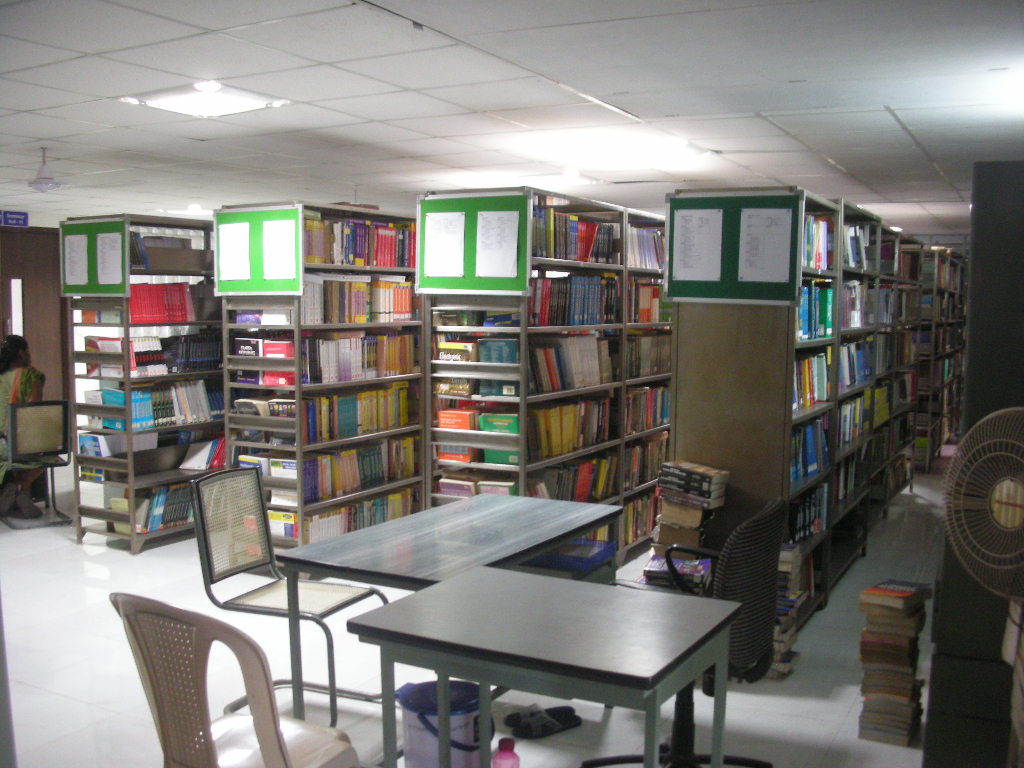
Book shelves at the library.

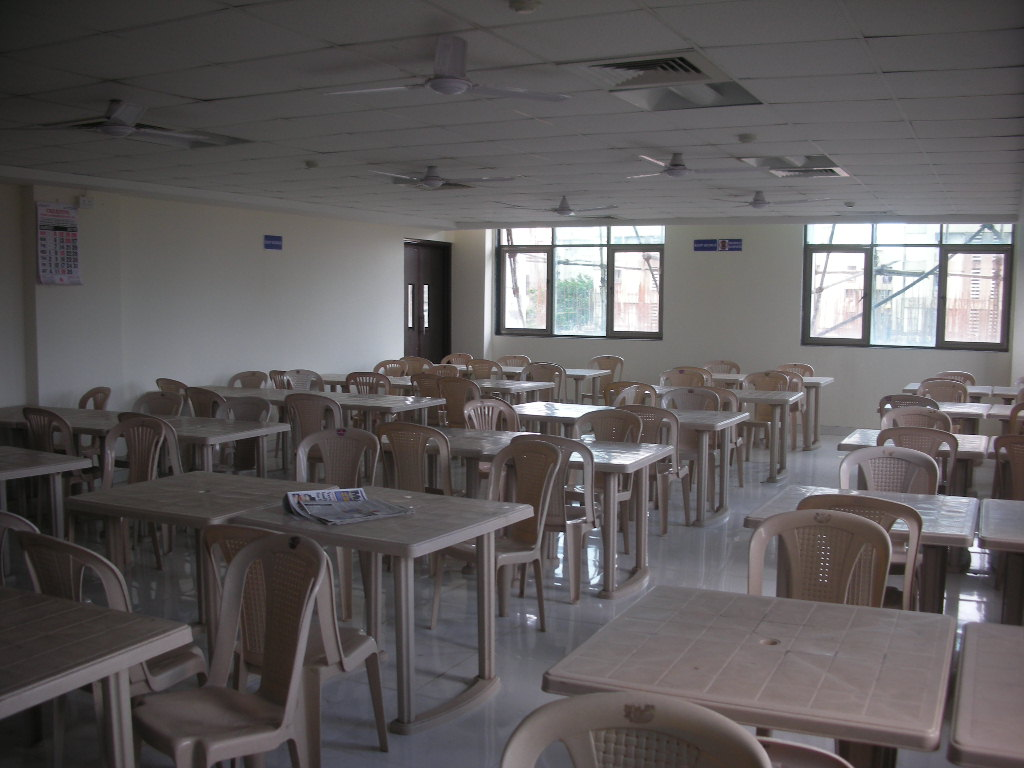
Reading room.

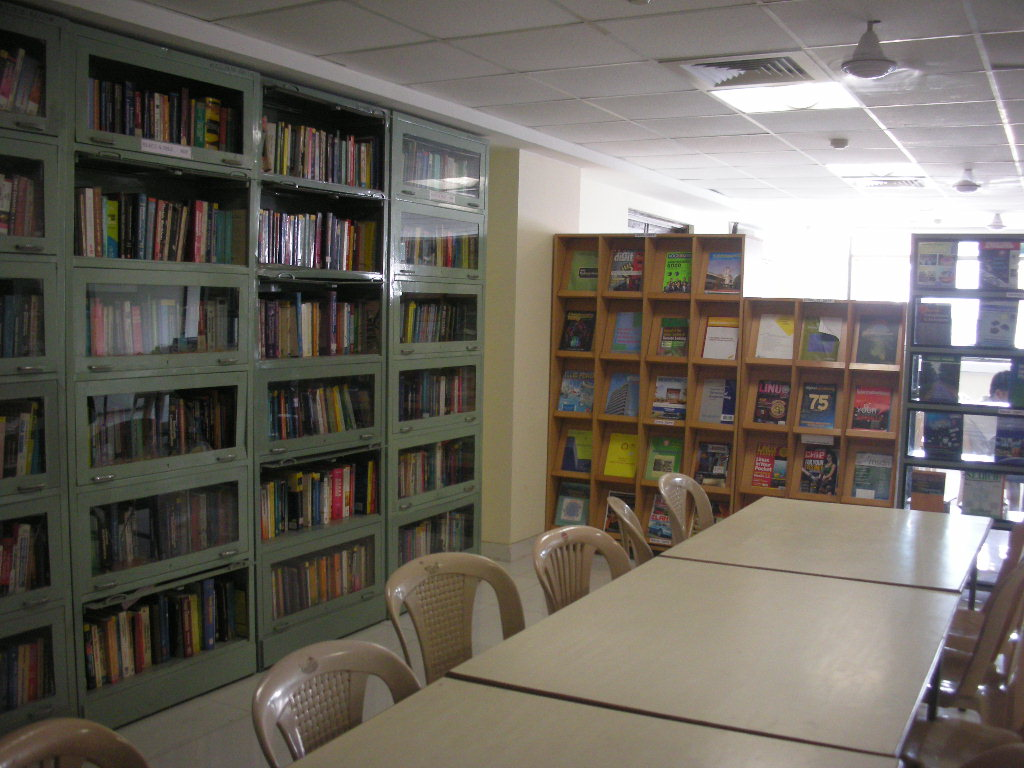
Reference section at the library.

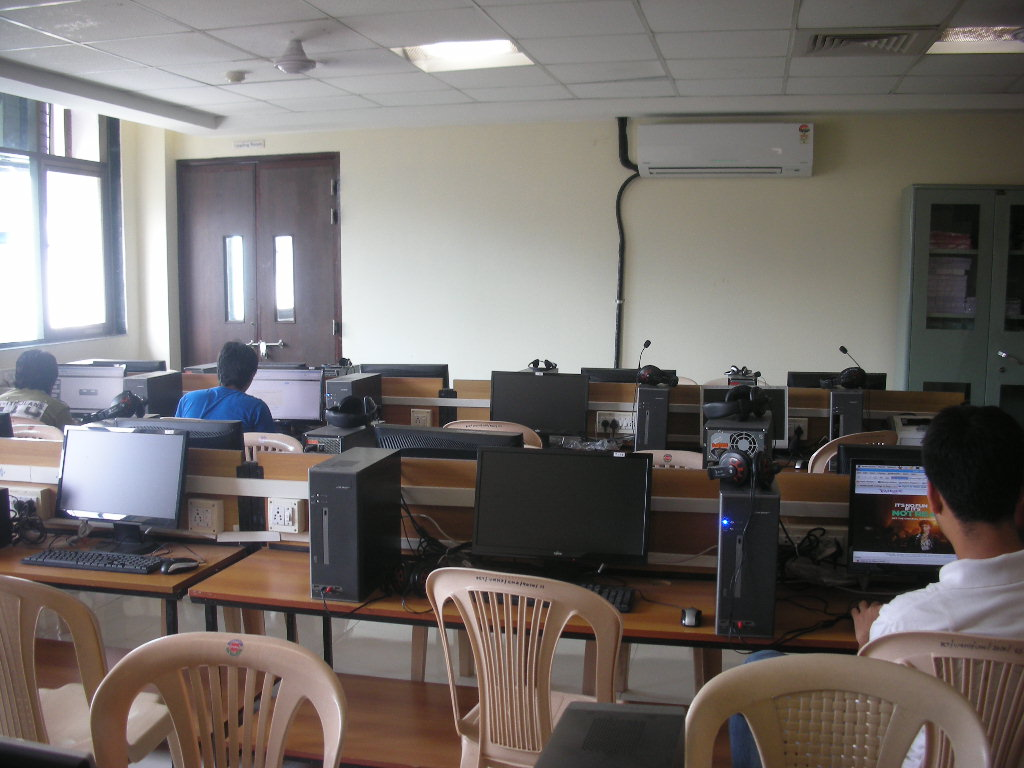
Internet access section at the library.
