= Lokmanya Nagar =

- Locality
- Location in Maharashtra, India
- Coordinates: 19.253°N 72.978°E
- Country: India
- State: Maharashtra
- District: Thane

Languages
  - Official: Marathi
- Time zone: UTC+5:30 (IST)
- Vehicle registration: MH-04-XX-XXXX

Lokmanya Nagar is a locality in Thane city of Maharashtra state in India. It nearly 6 kilometers from Thane railway station and is sheltered by Sanjay Gandhi National Park. It is also near to Upvan Lake,

== Brihanmumbai Electricity Supply & Transport (BEST) ==
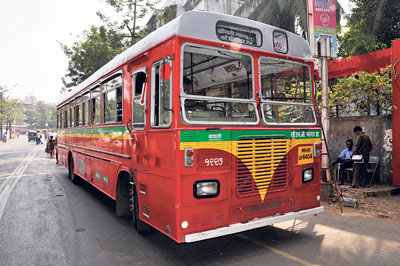
BEST Bus

List of some important BEST bus route numbers plying to and from and passing through Mulund:

Route No	Starting	Destination	Route Description
453Ltd	Lokmanya Nagar Thane	Wadala Depot	via Kamgar hospital, LBS Marg, E.Express Highway
497Ltd	Ghatkopar Depot	Lokmanya Nagar	via Mulund West-Mulund Depot, Mulund Station, Mulund (WEST)checknaka

== Thane Municipal Transport (TMT) ==
TMT's New AC Bus

TMT New Low Floor JNNURM Buses

=== TMT ===
There are a number of Thane Municipal Transport buses for traveling to and from Thane district. The two major TMT bus stops are at the Kelkar - Vaze College (Mulund East) and Mulund Railway Station (West).

Route No	Starting	Destination	Route Description
102	Mulund Railway Station (W)	Lokamanya Nagar	via Mulund Kamgar Hospital, LBS Check Naka, Passport Office, J.B. Sawant Co.
115	Mulund Railway Station (W)	Laxmi Park (More Wadi)	via Dumping Road, LBS Check Naka, Passport Office, Wagale Circle, Indira Nagar, Lokmanya Nagar, Yashodhan Nagar, Kores Co
23	Lokamanya Nagar	Vrundavan Society	via Yashodhan Nagar, Kamgar Hospital, Ambika Nagar, Road No.16, Passport Office (MIDC), Teen Hath Naka, Hariniwas Circle, Thane Station (W), Jambhali Naka, Castle Mill
35	Lokamanya Nagar	Kharegaon	via Yashodhan Nagar, Kores Co., Vartak Nagar, Cadbury Jn., Nitin Co., Almeida Rd., Hariniwas, Thane Station (W), Jambhali Naka, RTO, Kalwa Naka, Kharegaon Naka
36	Lokamanya Nagar	Kharegaon	via Yashodhan Nagar, Indira Nagar, Kamgar Hospital, Nitin Co., Almeida Rd., Hariniwas, Thane Station (W), Jambhali Naka, RTO, Kalwa Naka, Kharegaon Naka
58	Lokamanya Nagar	Mira Road Station (E)	via Yashodhan Nagar, Kamgar Hospital, Passport Office, LBS Check Naka, Teen Hath Naka, Hariniwas, Thane Railway Station (W), Jambhli Naka, Castle Mill, Majiwada Naka, Kapurbawdi, Manpada, Patlipada, Waghbil Naka, Kasarvadavli, Owala, Gaimukh, Kajupada, Fountain Hotel, Kashimira, Silver Park
82	Lokamanya Nagar	Patlipada	via Yashodhan Nagar, Kamgar Hospital, Passport Office, LBS Check Naka, Teen Hath Naka, Hariniwas, Thane Railway Station (W), Jambhli Naka, Castle Mill, Majiwada Naka, Kapurbawdi, Manpada, Patlipada
90	Lokamanya Nagar	Kolshet	via Yashodhan Nagar, Kamgar Hospital, Passport Office, LBS Check Naka, Teen Hath Naka, Malhar Cinema, Thane Railway Station (W), Jambhli Naka, Castle Mill, Majiwada Naka, Kapurbawdi, Balkum, Bayer Co, Air Force Station

== Other ==
Autorickshaws and taxis are also very common in Lokmanya Nagar.

== See also ==
- Arun Krida Mandal (Lokmanya Nagarcha Maharaja)
- Patlipada
- Hiranandani Estate
- Kolshet
- Kaasar Vadavali
- Waghbil
- Brahmand
- Brindaban Society
- Wagle Estate
- Talao Pali
- Thanecha Ashtavinayak
- Panchpakhadi
- Ghodbunder Fort
- Upvan Lake
