= The Rutu Estate =

Residential property in Thane, India

The Rutu Estate is a Residential Complex located at Patlipada, Ghodbunder Road, Maharashtra state in India. It is a located under Thane city. Official Residence of Thane Municipal Commissioner located right opposite to the rutu estate complex & Hiranandani Estate is Situated close by, Shree Maa School is just 2 mins away from the complex.

== Introduction ==
The Rutu Estate is a 3rd Residential Complex on the Ghodbunder Road, after Rutu Park and Rutu Enclave built by the Rutu Developers. Rutu Estate, however, is on a much larger scale as compared to the Other Rutu Residential Complex. The Rutu Estate has a Towers section which is being missing in the other Rutu Complexes.

Residential towers from 7 storeys to 18 storeys form the spectacular skyline in the area. The complex offers a wide choice of one, two, two & half, three bedroom luxury apartments.

== Residential Complex ==
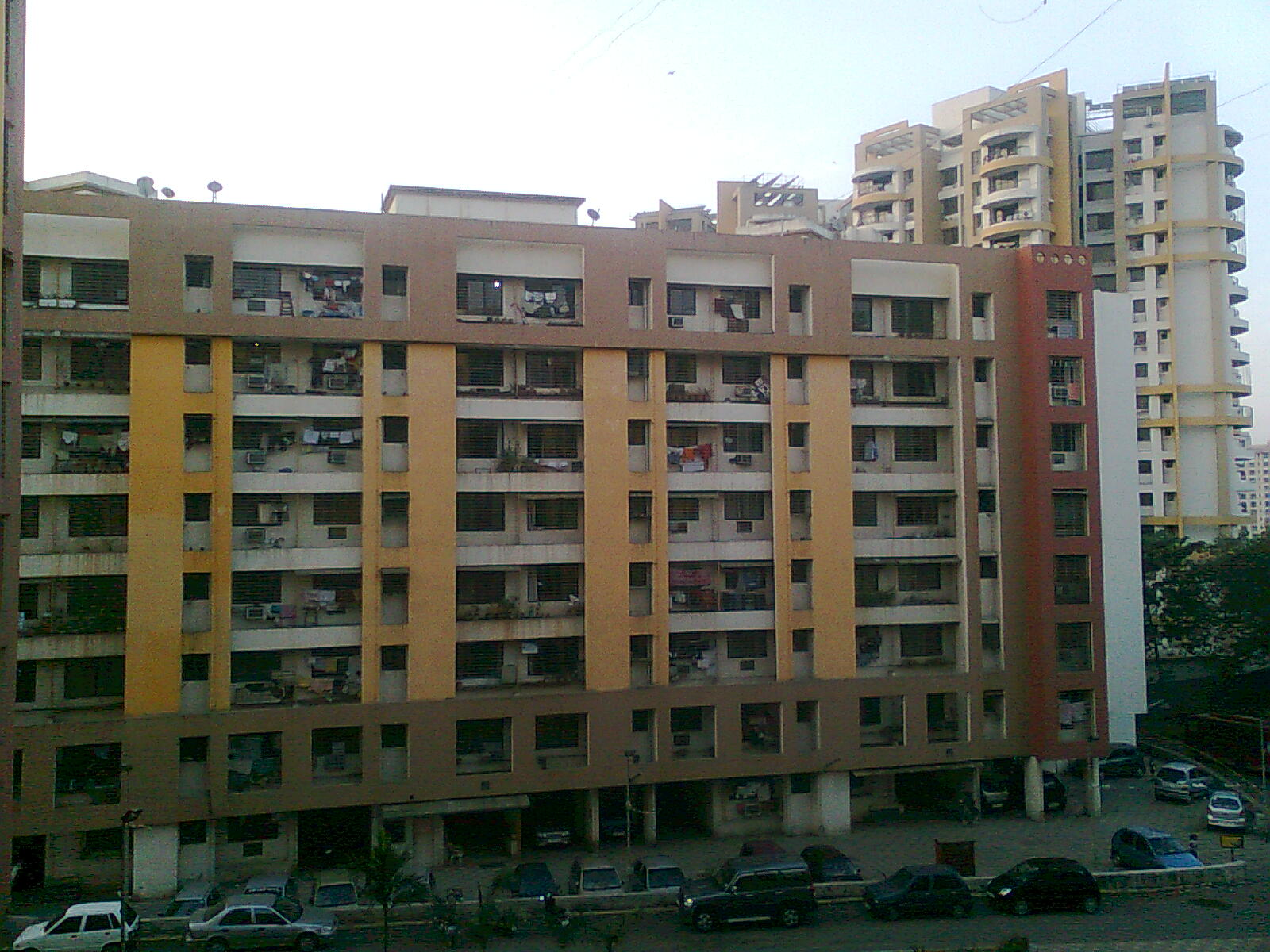
The Rutu Estate

Residential Buildings have been named as the Alphabets

Building Name	Floors	Flat BHK	No. of Wings
A	7	2BHK	A1 - A2
B	7	2BHK & 2 1/2BHK	B1 - B2 - B3 - B4
C	7	2BHK & 1BHK	C1 - C2 - C3 - C4
D	7	1BHK	D1 - D2 - D3 - D4 - D5 - D6 - D7 - D8 - D9 - D10 - D11 - D12
E	16 except E4 which is 14	2BHK & 2 1/2 BHK	E1 - E2 - E3 - E4

== Shopping Centre ==
Dhanlaxmi Complex is the Commercial Section of The Rutu Estate and Rutu Towers, i.e. the only Shopping Center, many General store, fast food center, ATM, Medical Shop, Internet Cafe, Barber Shop, Fitness Gym and a Hospital is located inside this Commercial Complex.

Domino's Pizza is located in Dhanlaxmi Complex along with YES Bank ATM.

== List of Amenities ==
- Club House (with gymnasium, table tennis, etc.)
- Swimming Pool
- Lush greenery with Gardens and Play Grounds

== Accessibility ==
The Complex is just 30 minutes (6 km) away from Thane Railway station. Mulund Railway station is also quite close which is 35 - 40 mins (9 km) away. Through Ghodbunder Road with quick access to Borivali /Mira Road, the Western Suburb.

== Other attractions ==
The other Important place which is not located inside the Complex are

Education Center

- Close proximity to Sri Ma Vidyalaya (SSC/CBSE Board) school
- Hiranandani Foundation School (Kindergarten to 12th standard with ICSE syllabus), Millennium Pre-School & The Reading Tree- Pre Primary School is located inside Hiranandani Estate.

Banks & ATMs

- State Bank of India
- Axis Bank (UTI Bank) & ATM
- Indian Bank & ATM
- Kotak Mahindra Bank
- Andhra Bank & ATM
- HDFC Bank ATM
- ICICI Bank

Most Prominent commercial stores

- Godrej Nature's Basket - Grocery Store, Spencer's Supermarket, Spinach - Grocery Store, etc. Situated close by in neighbouring Hiranandani Estate
- Vijay Sales & Mi (Kapurbavadi) - 10 mins away
- More Store (Lawkim) - 5 mins away
- Reebok Store - 5 mins away

Cinema Halls & Eatry

- R- Mall (Lawkim) - 5 mins away
- CineMax: Wonder Mall (Kapurbavadi) - 10 mins away
- Baskin-Robbins, Naturals Ice Cream, Cafe Coffee Day, Spice Up Pure Veg. Restaurant, etc. Situated close by in neighbouring Hiranandani Estate
- Pizza Hut Located inside Wonder Mall
- McDonalds

Water Park & Amusement Park

- Suraj Water park (Waghbil) - 5 mins away
- Tiku jini wadi (Kokanipada) - 10 mins away

Worship Place

- Shree Ganesh Temple near Hiranandani Gate.
- Ekvira mata Temple (Gaondevi) [Village Goddess] opposite TMC Commissioner Bungalow
- Shiv Mandir in Patlipada Village
- Church is located at Lawkim and Majiwada (i.e. 5 & 10 mins away resp)
- Masjid at Kasarwadavli and Kapurbawadi

== See also ==
- Brahmand
- Hiranandani Estate
- Kaasar Vadavali
- Pachpakhadi
- Patlipada
- Thane
- Thane Municipal Transport (TMT)
- Transportation in Thane
- Waghbil
