= List of tallest buildings in Thane =

Thane, part of the broader Mumbai Metropolitan Region, has experienced rapid growth in the number of skyscrapers and high-rise buildings and is the fastest growing city in terms of vertical growth outside of Mumbai in the wider metropolitan area . Thane primarily serves as a residential suburb on the edge of Mumbai due to robust infrastructure growth, relative affordability and proximity to Mumbai. As of November 2025, Thane has 32 topped out and completed skyscrapers taller than 150 metres (492 ft). (A skyscraper is defined as a continuously habitable high-rise building that has over 40 floors and is taller than approximately 150 metres (492 ft) according to international standards.)

The Address By GS Raymond Reality twin tower complex are currently the tallest towers in Thane at a height of 193m each.

== Skyline images ==
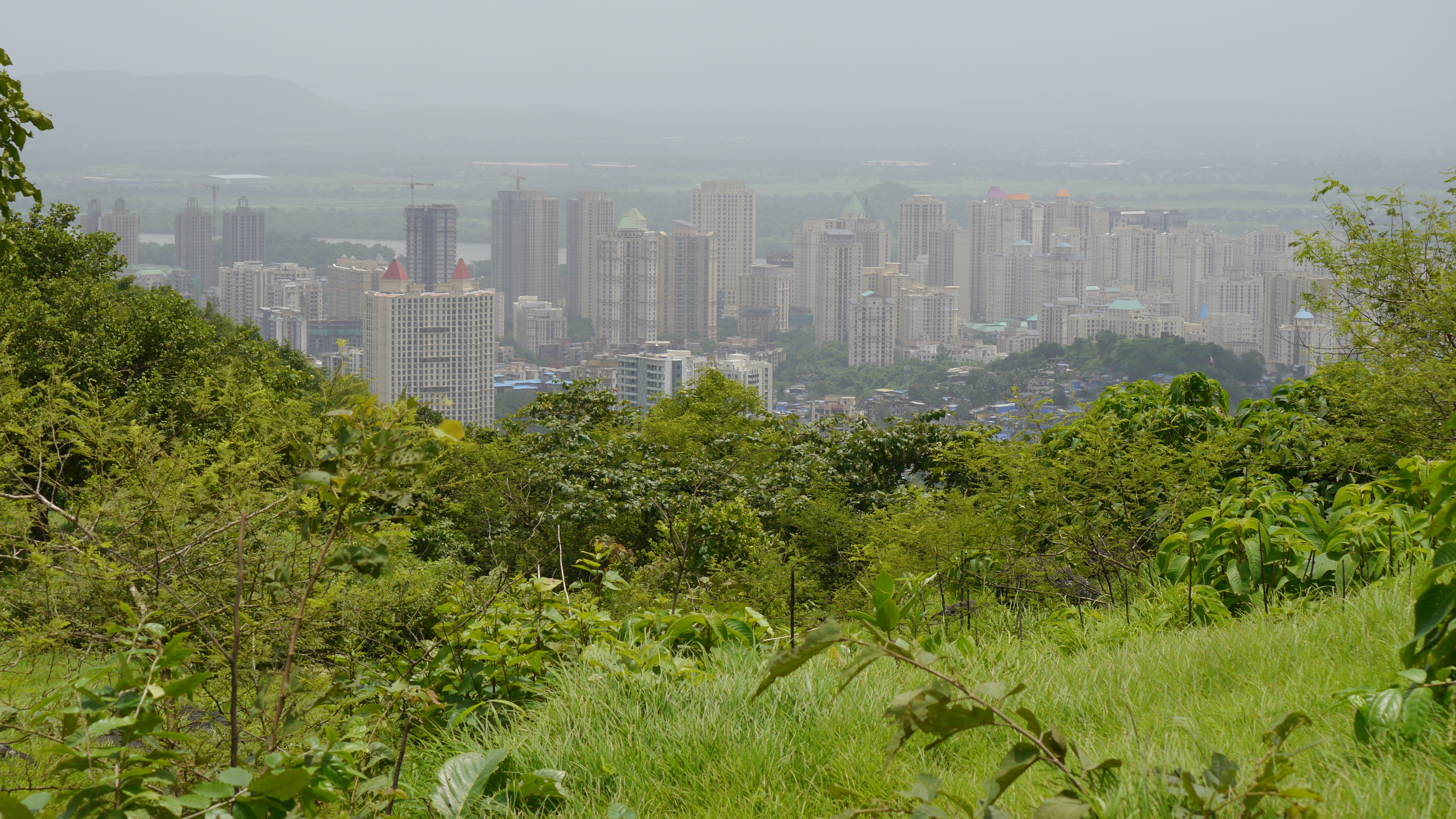
Skyline of Thane as seen from Yeoor Hills

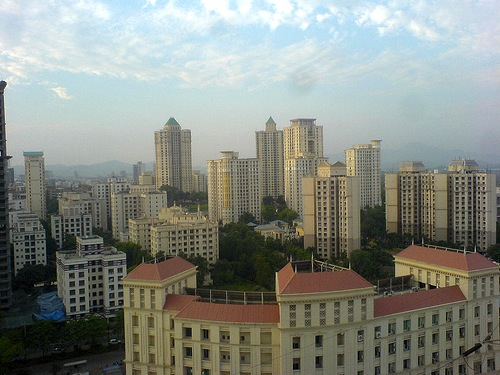
Hiranandani Township in Thane

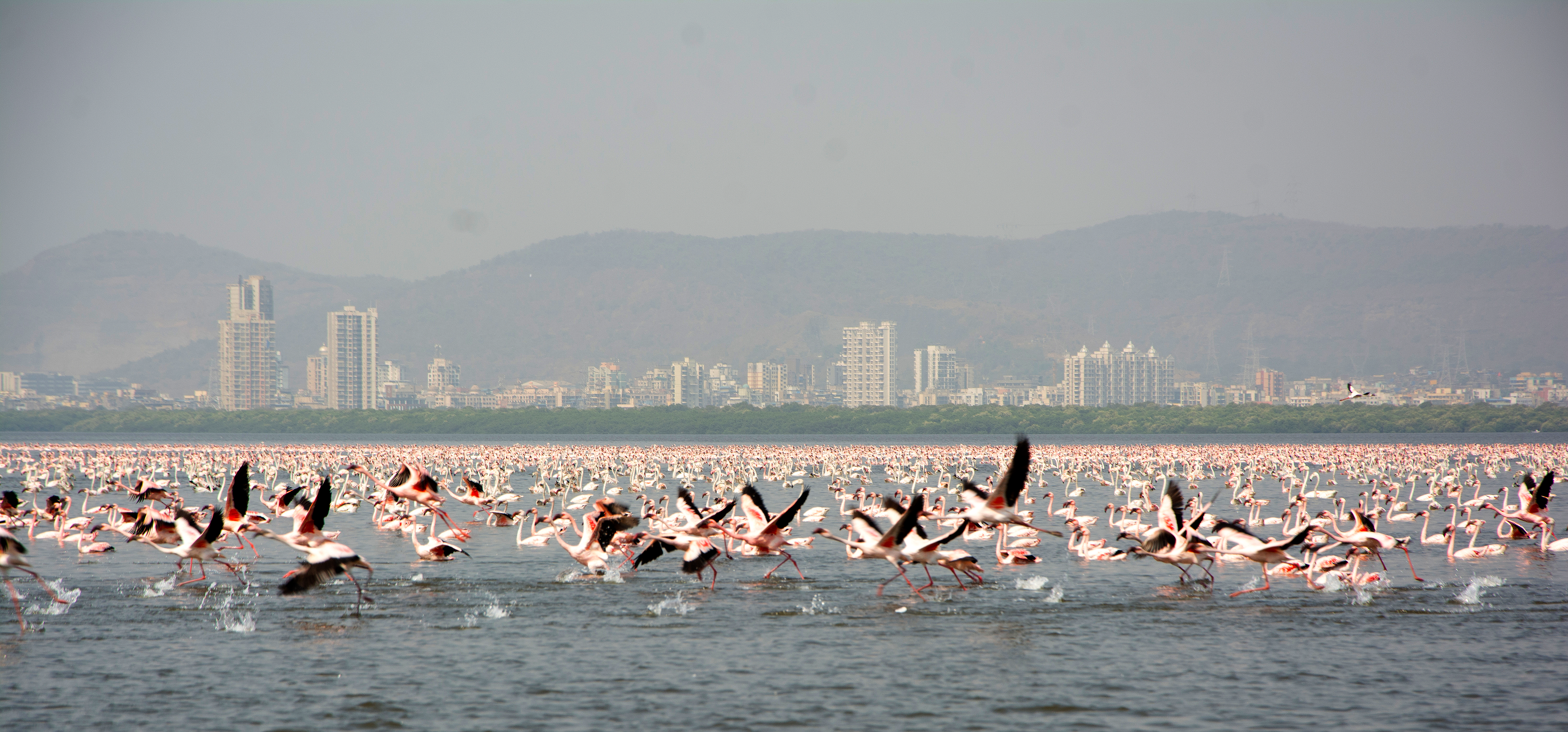
Thane city at a distance

== Tallest buildings ==
This list ranks the tallest completed and topped out buildings in the Thane that stand at least 150 m (492 ft) as of November 2025. This includes spires and architectural details but does not include antenna masts.

Key:

Was the tallest building in Thane upon completion.
Topped out but not yet completed.

Rank	Name	Location	Image	Height	Floors	Year	Purpose	Notes
1	The Address by GS Raymond Realty T1	Pokhran 19.213942°N 72.968706°E	-	193 metres (633 ft)	60	2025-2026	Residential	Topped out and structurally completed, handover expected in 2025 or early 2026.
2	The Address by GS Raymond Realty T2	Pokhran 19.213478°N 72.968515°E	-	193 metres (633 ft)	60	2025-2026	Residential	Topped out and structurally completed, handover expected in 2025 or early 2026. T2 was also built with the same specifications as T1
3	Hiranandani Falcon	Thane 19.258220°N 72.983778°E	-	160 (525)	50	2028	Residential	Tower has been Structurally Topped Out
4	Rustomjee Urbania Azziano A	Majiwada, Thane 19.207681°N 72.988526°E	-	156 metres (512 ft)	47	2022	Residential	Height Confirmed in RERA. All towers share the same specifications as the cited RERA
5	Rustomjee Urbania Azziano B	Majiwada, Thane 19.208035°N 72.988445°E	-	156 metres (512 ft)	47	2022	Residential	Height Confirmed in RERA. All towers share the same specifications as the cited RERA
6	Rustomjee Urbania Azziano C	Majiwada, Thane 19.208288°N 72.988296°E	-	156 metres (512 ft)	47	2022	Residential	Height Confirmed in RERA. All towers share the same specifications as the cited RERA
7	Rustomjee Urbania Azziano D	Majiwada, Thane 19.208679°N 72.988266°E	-	156 metres (512 ft)	47	2022	Residential	Height Confirmed in RERA. All towers share the same specifications as the cited RERA
8	Rustomjee Urbania Azziano E	Majiwada, Thane 19.209122°N 72.988324°E	-	156 metres (512 ft)	47	2022	Residential	Height Confirmed in RERA. All towers share the same specifications as the cited RERA
9	Rustomjee Urbania Azziano F	Majiwada, Thane 19.209488°N 72.988038°E	-	156 metres (512 ft)	47	2022	Residential	Height Confirmed in RERA. All towers share the same specifications as the cited RERA
10	Rustomjee Urbania Azziano G	Majiwada, Thane 19.209588°N 72.987752°E	-	156 metres (512 ft)	47	2022	Residential	Height Confirmed in RERA. All towers share the same specifications as the cited RERA
11	Rustomjee Urbania Azziano H	Majiwada, Thane 19.209574°N 72.987424°E	-	156 metres (512 ft)	47	2022	Residential	Height Confirmed in RERA. All towers share the same specifications as the cited RERA
12	Rustomjee Urbania Azziano I	Majiwada, Thane 19.209016°N 72.987468°E	-	156 metres (512 ft)	47	2022	Residential	Height Confirmed in RERA. All towers share the same specifications as the cited RERA
13	Rustomjee Urbania Azziano J	Majiwada, Thane 19.208507°N 72.987606°E	-	156 metres (512 ft)	47	2022	Residential	Height Confirmed in RERA. All towers share the same specifications as the cited RERA
14	Rustomjee Urbania Azziano K	Majiwada, Thane 19.208070°N 72.987795°E	-	156 metres (512 ft)	47	2022	Residential	Height Confirmed in RERA. All towers share the same specifications as the cited RERA
15	Rustomjee Urbania Azziano L	Majiwada, Thane 19.207620°N 72.988002°E	-	156 metres (512 ft)	47	2022	Residential	Height Confirmed in RERA. All towers share the same specifications as the cited RERA
16	Dynamix Parkwoods D6	Thane 19.260144°N 72.968273°E	-	156 (512)	48	2026	Residential	Topped out and structurally completed, expected to be ready for possession in 2026.
17	Raymond Ten X Habitat Wing A	Pokhran Road 19.215054°N 72.966243°E	-	155 metres (509 ft)	42	2023	Residential	
18	Raymond Ten X Habitat Wing B	Pokhran Road 19.214960°N 72.966681°E	-	155 metres (509 ft)	42	2023	Residential	
19	Raymond Ten X Habitat Wing C	Pokhran Road 19.214845°N 72.967057°E	-	155 metres (509 ft)	42	2023	Residential	
20	Raymond Ten X Habitat Wing D	Pokhran Road 19.214656°N 72.967445°E	-	155 metres (509 ft)	42	2023	Residential	
21	Raymond Ten X Habitat Wing E	Pokhran Road 19.214547°N 72.967791°E	-	155 metres (509 ft)	42	2023	Residential	
22	Raymond Ten X Habitat Wing F	Pokhran Road 19.213708°N 72.965927°E	-	155 metres (509 ft)	42	2023	Residential	
23	Raymond Ten X Habitat Wing G	Pokhran Road 19.213690°N 72.966371°E	-	155 metres (509 ft)	42	2023	Residential	
24	Raymond Ten X Habitat Wing H	Pokhran Road 19.213674°N 72.966739°E	-	155 metres (509 ft)	42	2023	Residential	
25	Raymond Ten X Habitat Wing I	Pokhran Road 19.213605°N 72.967123°E	-	155 metres (509 ft)	42	2023	Residential	
26	Raymond Ten X Habitat Wing J	Pokhran Road 19.213502°N 72.967557°E	-	155 metres (509 ft)	42	2023	Residential	
27	Raymond Ten X Era T1	Thane 19.211244°N 72.969583°E	-	153 metres (502 ft)	40	2025	Residential	All 3 towers built at 153m
28	Raymond Ten X Era T2	Thane 19.210785°N 72.969580°E	-	153 metres (502 ft)	40	2025	Residential	All 3 towers built at 153m
29	Raymond Ten X Era T3	Thane 19.210620°N 72.970164°E	-	153 metres (502 ft)	40	2025	Residential	All 3 towers built at 153m
30	Mahavir Spring Daffodils	Thane 19.221832°N 72.961200°E	-	153 (502)	45	2026	Residential	Structurally topped out. completion expected in 2026. Height of the building is 146m but overhead structure of 7m not counted in total height. Confirmed from RERA
31	Rosa Manhattan	Thane 19.258239°N 72.977802°E	-	150 metres (492 ft)	40	2025-2026	Residential	Topped out and structurally completed, handover expected in 2025. (height on documents is 146.9m but only counted till the last habitable floor. Lift Room Structure on top is not accounted for making it 150m+. Document number 6
32	Kalpataru Immensa H	Kolshet 19.230337°N 72.989465°E	-	150 metres (492 ft)	43	2021	Residential	Height confirmed at 150.02m in RERA
33	Kalpataru Immensa G	Kolshet 19.230338°N 72.990104°E	-	150 metres (492 ft)	43	2021	Residential	Height confirmed at 150.02m in RERA
34	Godrej Exquisite T1	Thane 19.252174°N 72.973456°E	-	150 (492)	40	2026	Residential	Tower is 141m tall but overhead structure of 9 to 10m not counted. Hence 150m. Tower has been Topped Out
35	Godrej Exquisite T2	Thane 19.252182°N 72.973470°E	-	150 (492)	40	2026	Residential	Tower is 141m tall but overhead structure of 9 to 10m not counted. Hence 150m. Tower has been Topped Out
36	Godrej Exquisite T3	Thane 19.252160°N 72.973442°E	-	150 (492)	40	2026	Residential	Tower is 141m tall but overhead structure of 9 to 10m not counted. Hence 150m. Tower has been Topped Out

== Tallest under construction or proposed ==
=== Under construction ===
This list ranks the tallest under-construction and launched buildings in Thane that stand at least 150 m (492 ft) as of November 2025. This includes spires and architectural details but does not include antenna masts.

Sr. no.	Name	Locale	Image	Height	Floors	Completion year	Building type	Notes
1	STG Star Living	Thane 19.188407°N 72.965054°E	-	235 (771)	72	2029	Residential	Tower is actively U/C and not on hold. However project will miss original deadline of 2027
2	Oberoi Forestville T1	Thane 19.237510°N 72.988539°E	-	208.40 (684)	66	2027	Residential	
3	Oberoi Forestville T2	Thane 19.237530°N 72.988539°E	-	208.40 (684)	66	2027	Residential	
4	Oberoi Forestville T3	Thane 19.237490°N 72.988539°E	-	208.40 (684)	66	2027	Residential	
5	Oberoi Forestville T4	Thane 19.237510°N 72.988559°E	-	208.40 (684)	66	2027	Residential	
6	Oberoi Forestville T5	Thane 19.237510°N 72.988519°E	-	208.40 (684)	66	2027	Residential	
7	Oberoi Garden City T1	Thane 19.218676°N 72.966231°E	-	208 (682)	67	2027	Residential	
8	Oberoi Garden City T2	Thane 19.218696°N 72.966231°E	-	208 (682)	67	2027	Residential	
9	Oberoi Garden City T3	Thane 19.218656°N 72.966231°E	-	208 (682)	67	2027	Residential	
10	Oberoi Garden City T4	Thane 19.218676°N 72.966251°E	-	208 (682)	67	2027	Residential	
11	Oberoi Garden City T5	Thane 19.218676°N 72.966211°E	-	208 (682)	67	2027	Residential	
12	L&T Evara Heights T1	Thane 19.212003°N 72.969474°E	-	201 (659)	57	2030	Residential	Terrace not taken fully into account hence it is 201m
13	L&T Evara Heights T2	Thane 19.212023°N 72.969474°E	-	201 (659)	57	2030	Residential	Terrace not taken fully into account hence it is 201m
14	L&T Evara Heights T3	Thane 19.211983°N 72.969474°E	-	201 (659)	57	2030	Residential	Terrace not taken fully into account hence it is 201m
15	L&T Evara Heights T4	Thane 19.212003°N 72.969494°E	-	201 (659)	57	2030	Residential	Terrace not taken fully into account hence it is 201m
16	L&T Evara Heights T5	Thane 19.212003°N 72.969454°E	-	201 (659)	57	2030	Residential	Terrace not taken fully into account hence it is 201m
17	Hiranandani Westgate Somerset	Thane 19.260946°N 72.975221°E	-	197 (646)	59	2031	Residential	
18	Aanya Crystal Antaara T1	Thane 19.234176°N 72.974348°E	-	196 (643)	48	2028	Residential	
19	Aanya Crystal Antaara T2	Thane 19.234196°N 72.974348°E	-	196 (643)	48	2028	Residential	
20	Wembley 24	Thane 19.216271°N 72.981850°E	-	195 (640)	60	2028	Residential	
21	Yuvan Stellar	Thane 19.198221°N 72.965065°E	-	195 (640)	59	2027	Residential	Approvals filed for 51 floors but developer is building 8 more floors
22	Runwal Lands End T1	Thane 19.239426°N 72.993222°E	-	191 (627)	57	2031	Residential	Overhead structures height not counted hence 191m
23	Runwal Lands End T2	Thane 19.239446°N 72.993222°E	-	191 (627)	57	2031	Residential	Overhead structures height not counted hence 191m
24	Runwal Lands End T3	Thane 19.239406°N 72.993222°E	-	191 (627)	57	2031	Residential	Overhead structures height not counted hence 191m
25	Ashar Pulse T1	Thane 19.214557°N 72.978286°E	-	190.5 (625)	55	2028	Residential	Partial approvals filed till 42 floors but tower is 55 floors. Height calculated by adding 13 more floors with floor to ceiling height of 3.05m as seen from RERA
26	Ashar Pulse T2	Thane 19.214577°N 72.978286°E	-	190.5 (625)	55	2028	Residential	Partial approvals filed till 42 floors but tower is 55 floors. Height calculated by adding 13 more floors with floor to ceiling height of 3.05m as seen from RERA
27	Thane Municipal Corporation Building	Thane 19.211504°N 72.968786°E	-	190 (623)	32	2027	Commercial	Architect states tower is 190m
28	Rustomjee La Vie T1	Thane 19.211807°N 72.991164°E	-	184 (604)	57	2028	Residential	
29	Rustomjee La Vie T2	Thane 19.211827°N 72.991164°E	-	184 (604)	57	2028	Residential	
30	Rustomjee La Vie T3	Thane 19.211787°N 72.991164°E	-	184 (604)	57	2028	Residential	
31	Rustomjee Verdant Vistas T1	Thane 19.210882°N 72.993278°E	-	183 (600)	46	2030	Residential	
32	Rustomjee Verdant Vistas T2	Thane 19.210902°N 72.993278°E	-	183 (600)	46	2030	Residential	
33	Hiranandani Belicia	Thane 19.199429°N 72.965930°E	-	178 (584)	48	2028	Residential	Partial approvals filed till 35 floors but tower is 48 floors. Height calculated by adding floor to ceiling height for missing 13 floors
34	Purva Panorama T4	Thane 19.246095°N 72.977082°E	-	176.15 (578)	54	2031	Residential	
35	Purva Panorama T5	Thane 19.246072°N 72.977060°E	-	176.15 (578)	54	2031	Residential	
36	Hiranandani Westgate Belvedere A	Thane 19.260908°N 72.975310°E	-	175 (574)	51	2031	Residential	
37	Hiranandani Westgate Belvedere B	Thane 19.260898°N 72.975420°E	-	175 (574)	51	2031	Residential	
38	Purva Panorama T1	Thane 19.246087°N 72.977071°E	-	174.90 (574)	53	2031	Residential	
39	Runwal 25 Hours Life T1	Thane 19.234013°N 72.978443°E	-	173 (568)	55	2027	Residential	
40	Runwal 25 Hours Life T2	Thane 19.234033°N 72.978443°E	-	173 (568)	55	2027	Residential	
41	Runwal 25 Hours Life T3	Thane 19.233993°N 72.978443°E	-	173 (568)	55	2027	Residential	
42	Runwal 25 Hours Life T4	Thane 19.234013°N 72.978463°E	-	173 (568)	55	2027	Residential	
43	Runwal 25 Hours Life T5	Thane 19.233537°N 72.979216°E	-	173 (568)	55	2027	Residential	
44	Purva Panorama T2	Thane 19.246093°N 72.977078°E	-	172.95 (567)	52	2031	Residential	
45	Iris at Kashish Park	Thane 19.184874°N 72.957920°E	-	172 (564)	52	2028	Residential	
46	Kalpataru Estella T1	Thane 19.228988°N 72.993558°E	-	170 (558)	47	2030	Residential	
47	Kalpataru Estella T2	Thane 19.229008°N 72.993558°E	-	170 (558)	47	2030	Residential	
48	Purva Panorama T3	Thane 19.246068°N 72.977057°E	-	169.75 (557)	51	2031	Residential	
49	Shapoorji Pallonji Northern Lights T5	Thane 19.217333°N 72.973723°E	-	163.42 (536)	51	2028	Residential	
50	Raymond Invictus	Thane 19.210644°N 72.966906°E	-	163 (535)	36	2028	Residential	
51	Shapoorji Pallonji Northern Lights T4	Thane 19.217333°N 72.973723°E	-	161.5 (530)	51	2028	Residential	
52	Sheth Victoria T1	Thane 19.210237°N 72.973561°E	-	160.10 (525)	50	2026	Residential	
53	Sheth Victoria T2	Thane 19.210248°N 72.973573°E	-	160.10 (525)	50	2026	Residential	
54	Rustomjee La Familia T1	Thane 19.211974°N 72.989611°E	-	159.7 (524)	47	2027	Residential	
55	Rustomjee La Familia T2	Thane 19.211985°N 72.989620°E	-	159.7 (524)	47	2027	Residential	
56	Rustomjee La Familia T3	Thane 19.211960°N 72.989600°E	-	159.7 (524)	47	2027	Residential	
57	Kalpataru Primeira T1	Thane 19.227918°N 72.992423°E	-	159.7 (524)	48	2029	Residential	
58	Kalpataru Primeira T2	Thane 19.227925°N 72.992435°E	-	159.7 (524)	48	2029	Residential	
59	Shapoorji Pallonji Northern Lights T1	Thane 19.217333°N 72.973723°E	-	159.65 (524)	50	2028	Residential	
60	Shapoorji Pallonji Northern Lights T2	Thane 19.217333°N 72.973723°E	-	159.65 (524)	50	2028	Residential	
61	Shapoorji Pallonji Northern Lights T3	Thane 19.217333°N 72.973723°E	-	159.65 (524)	50	2028	Residential	
62	Runwal Zenith	Thane 19.223464°N 72.988517°E	-	158 (518)	50	2028	Residential	Partial approvals filed till 45 floors but tower is 50 floors as stated by developer. Height calculated by adding floor to ceiling height for missing five floors
63	Hiranandani Florencia A	Thane 19.261077°N 72.975004°E	-	157 (515)	50	2031	Residential	
64	Hiranandani Florencia B	Thane 19.261089°N 72.975018°E	-	157 (515)	50	2031	Residential	
65	Hiranandani Amalfi	Thane 19.261065°N 72.974992°E	-	157 (515)	50	2031	Residential	
66	Dynamix Parkwoods D5	Thane 19.260009°N 72.967592°E	-	156 (512)	48	2028	Residential	
67	Kalpataru Eternia T1	Thane 19.230251°N 72.991501°E	-	155 (509)	47	2029	Residential	
68	Kalpataru Eternia T2	Thane 19.230260°N 72.991493°E	-	155 (509)	47	2029	Residential	
69	Kalpataru Eternia T3	Thane 19.230242°N 72.991512°E	-	155 (509)	47	2029	Residential	
70	Om Divine Shloka	Thane 19.208250°N 72.959639°E	-	152 (499)	50	2029	Residential	
71	Jagdale Infrastructure	Thane 19.211549°N 72.975218°E	-	151.3 (496)	44	2028	Commercial	
72	Neelkanth Woods T1	Thane 19.243836°N 72.969720°E	-	150 (492)	45	2029	Residential	
73	Neelkanth Woods T2	Thane 19.243848°N 72.969735°E	-	150 (492)	45	2029	Residential	
74	Neelkanth Woods T3	Thane 19.243822°N 72.969704°E	-	150 (492)	45	2029	Residential	
75	Narang Privado T1	Thane 19.207104°N 72.959120°E	-	150 (492)	41	2028	Residential	
76	Narang Privado T2	Thane 19.207115°N 72.959125°E	-	150 (492)	41	2028	Residential	
77	Narang Privado T3	Thane 19.207095°N 72.959110°E	-	150 (492)	41	2028	Residential	
78	Narang Privado T4	Thane 19.207125°N 72.959135°E	-	150 (492)	41	2028	Residential	
79	Narang Privado T5	Thane 19.207083°N 72.959128°E	-	150 (492)	41	2028	Residential	

== See also ==
- List of tallest buildings in Mumbai
- List of tallest buildings in India
- Mumbai Metropolitan Region
