= Kavesar =

Kavesar is a locality in Thane city of Maharashtra state in India. Kavesar is located about 500 metres from the highway, the Ghodbunder Road and is nearly 7 kilometres from Thane railway station.

== History ==
Kavesar is mentioned as Kameshvar in the 15th-17th century Marathi-language text Mahikavatichi Bakhar; the name indicates the existence of a temple there.

== Features ==
It is developing rapidly with all amenities in the vicinity. Many residential complexes including Parkwoods, Regency Towers, Swastik Residency, Vijay Garden, Vijay Vilas, Vijay Vatika, Siddhi, Unnathi Woods, Soham Tropical Lagoon, Sadguru, Rosa Bella, Orion, and Cosmos are situated here. TMC will be building an 18-acre recreation park in this area. The proposed LRT by TMC will have a separate station for this area and will make the connectivity much better.

== Educational Institutes ==
- Saraswati School (English Medium - State Board)
- New Horizon Scholars School (English Medium - CBSE Board)
- Arya Cambridge School (English Medium - IGSCE Board)
- Rainbow International Pre-School
- Kidzee Pre-School
- TreeHouse Pre-School
- Muchhala Polytechnic College
