= Shubham Raje Junior College =

School in Thane, India

Coordinates: 19°14′54.95″N 72°58′45.87″E

logo

Shubhamraje Junior College is an Indian high school in Thane, Maharashtra, established in the year 2008.

It is situated in Thane, on Ghodbunder road, near Rutu Estate, Patlipada, opposite Sri Ma Vidyalaya. This college was founded by Dr. Parmeshwar Shivram Gatkal, who also served as the principal of the college from 2008 to 2025.
