= Tilak Nagar =

Tilak Nagar may refer to the following places in India named after Indian independence activist Bal Gangadhar Tilak (popularly known as Lokmanya Tilak):

- Tilak Nagar (Delhi)
  - Tilak Nagar metro station
  - Tilak Nagar Assembly constituency
- Tilak Nagar (Mumbai)
  - Tilak Nagar railway station
- Tilaknagar, Hyderabad

== See also ==
- Lokmanya Tilak (disambiguation)
- Lokmanya Nagar, Nagpur, Maharashtra, India
  - Lokmanya Nagar metro station
- Lokmanya Nagar railway station
