= Shubham Sharma =

Shubham Sharma may refer to:

- Shubham Sharma (Madhya Pradesh cricketer) (born 1993)
- Shubham Sharma (Rajasthan cricketer) (born 1997)

== See also ==
- Shubham, a given name
