= State Highway 42 (Maharashtra) =

Road in Maharashtra, India

State Highway 42
- ghodbunder road thane
- Thane ghodbunder road marked in Red on Thane area map
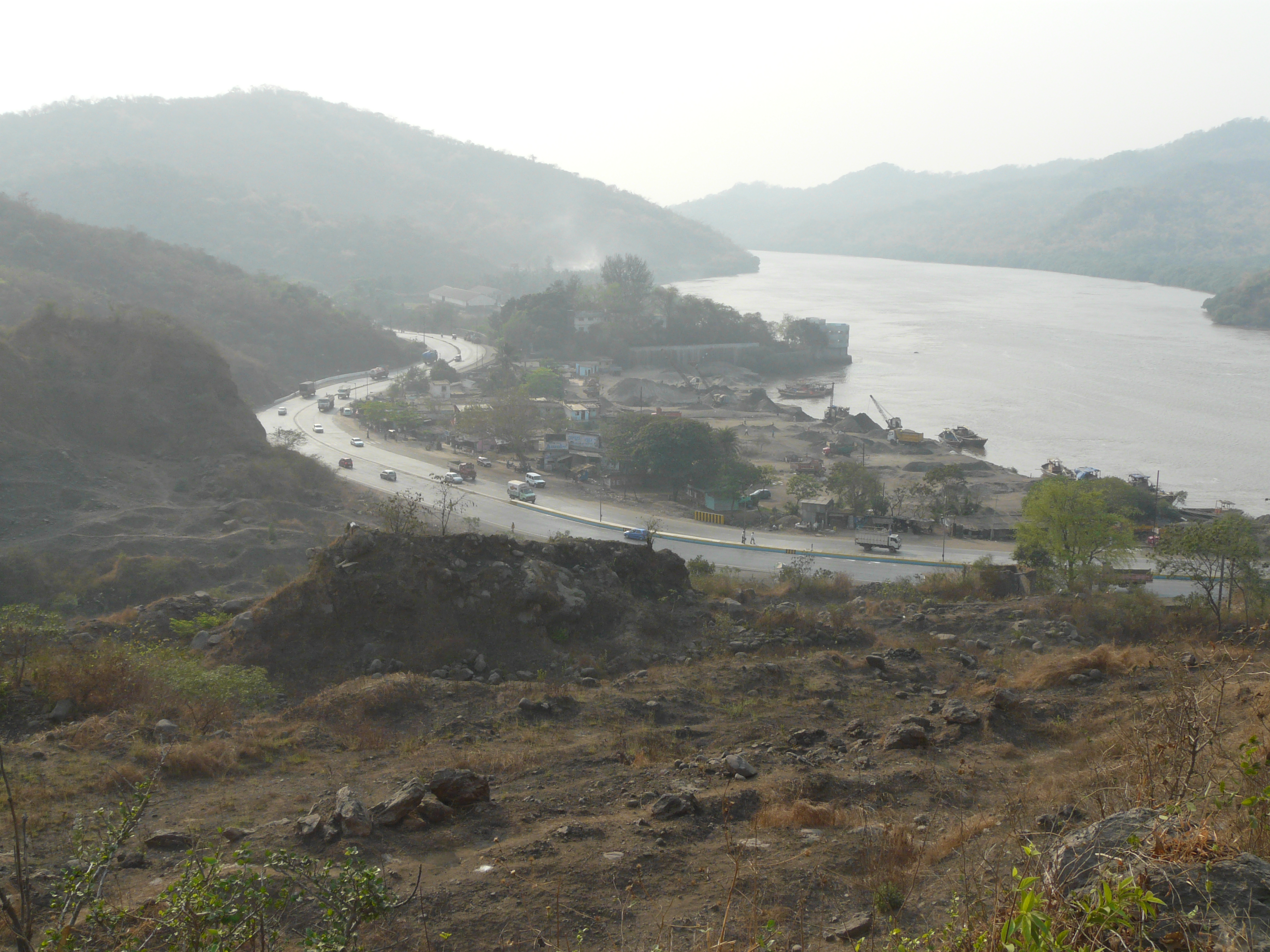
- Aerial view of Ghodbunder Road near Gaimukh

Route information
- Maintained by MSRDC

Major junctions
- From: Kapurbawdi, Thane
- National Highway 3 National Highway 8
- To: Ghodbunder, Thane

Location
- Country: India
- State: Maharashtra
- Districts: Thane

Highway system
- Roads in India; Expressways; National; State; Asian; State Highways in Maharashtra

Maharashtra State Highway 42, commonly referred to as Ghodbunder Road or G.B. Road, runs entirely through the district of Thane. It is one of the major roads leading out of Thane city and connects to the Eastern Express Highway coming from south at Kapurbawdi, which joins National Highway 3 at this junction from North-East. It also connects to the Western Express Highway coming from south at Ghodbunder village, which later joins National Highway 8 at this junction traveling Northwards towards Gujarat.

== General information ==
Maharashtra State Highway 42 is 14 km long and links the two main arterial roads of Mumbai, the Eastern Express Highway and the Western Express Highway. It connects to Eastern Express Highway at Kapurbawdi village and Western Express Highway at Ghodbunder village. The Kapurbawdi bridge has been constructed to ease the traffic congestion. The road falls within the municipal limits of two different municipal corporations. The stretch from Majiwada to Gaimukh village falls within the limits of Thane Municipal Corporation & from Gaimukh Village until the Mumbai-Ahmedabad Highway the road falls within the Mira-Bhayandar Municipal Corporation limits. This highway was tolled by the MSRDC through a concessionaire agreement awarded to Thane Ghodbunder Toll Road Limited which was a subsidiary of IRB Infrastructure. The highway is not subject to any toll as on date with the highway being handed back to the Maharashtra State Road Development Corporation effective 23.02.2021 This road skirts the northern boundary of Salsette Island providing scenic views of the Yeoor hills and the Thane creek.

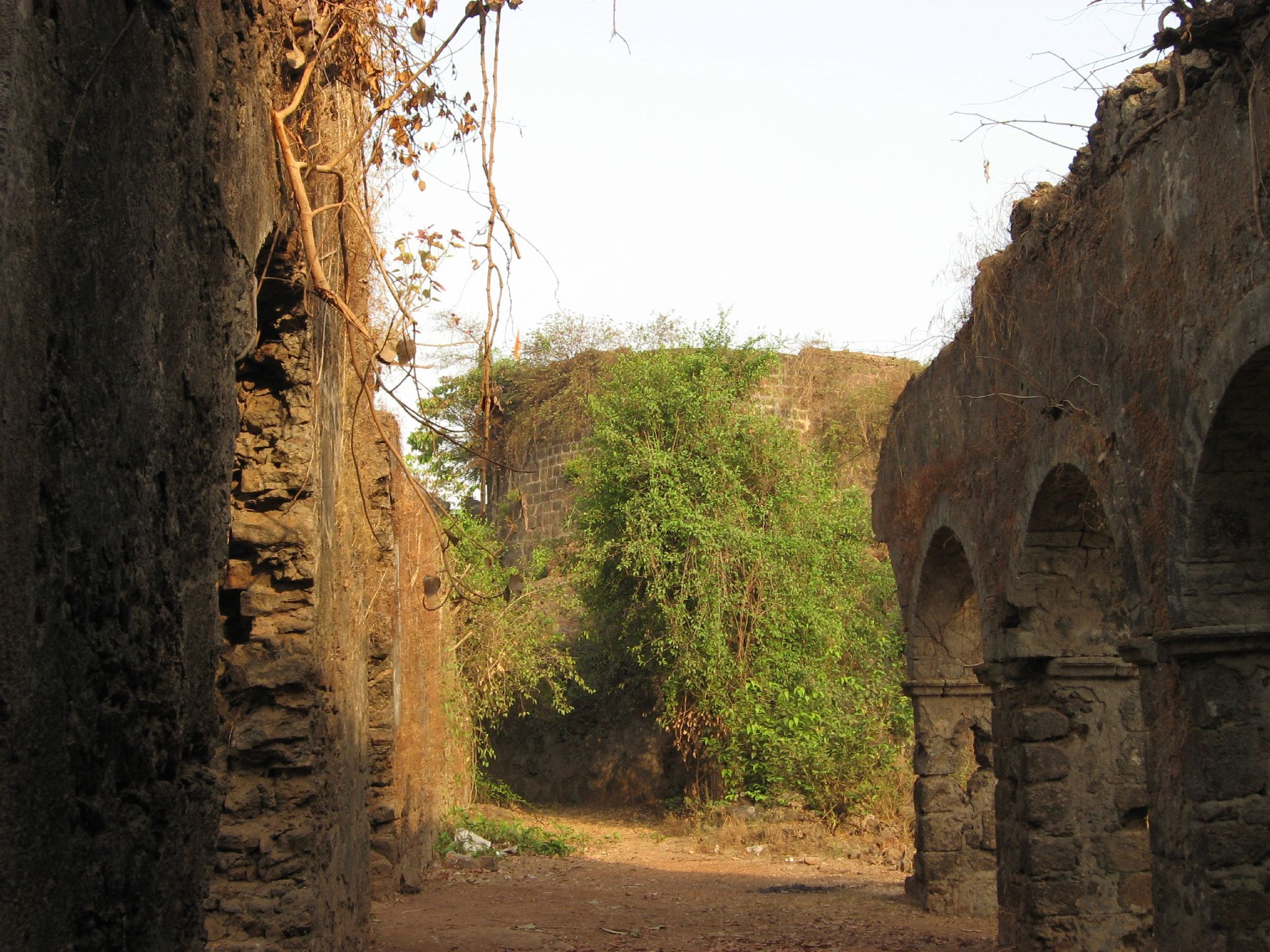
Ghodbunder fort ruins

Ghodbunder Road cuts across dense forests which form part of the Sanjay Gandhi National Park. It also skirts the Vasai Creek for most of its route and overlooks the forest from across the creek. In spite of development encroaching on the forest, much of flora and fauna continue to survive and prosper. Ghodbunder Road is lined with numerous historical monuments like the Ghodbunder Fort. Naglakot, Gaimukh Gadi and Firangkot, which although damaged now, unfolds stories of the 1500 century era reign of the Portuguese.

This road once played a crucial role in Indo-Arab trade and later the Portuguese used it to monopolise sea routes in the Arabian Sea, at one point acted as a bridge between distant cultures. Several empires fought wars to control it. The Persian horses came from the Arab countries used to land here in the port in Marathi Ghode means horse and bunder means port. Hence, it initially came to be known as Ghodegaon (horse village). Around the time of Chhatrapati Shivaji, the road was renamed as Ghodbunder Road after the port.

Locals say that till 1950, it was only a dirt road with residents of centuries old villages like Waghbil, Majhiwada, Patlipada, Ghodbunder, Kolshet and Kasarwadavli using bullock carts for transport. The surrounding forests had considerable plants like cashew, mangoes that were brought in by the Portuguese. The area was very rich in flora and fauna.

== Mumbai Metro Line 4 (Upcoming) ==
Green Line 4 of the Mumbai Metro, currently under construction, is part of the metro system for the city of Mumbai, India and is being developed by MMRDA and a consortium of international companies.

The 32.32 km (20.08 mi) line is planned to be fully elevated, and is expected to consist of 32 stations from Wadala, Mumbai to Kasarvadavali via Ghatkopar, Mulund. It is estimated to cost ₹14,549 crore (US$1.5 billion) (₹145.49 billion). Its construction was expected to begin by June 2018.

It is expected to be completed in 2022 and is expected to provide interconnectivity among the existing Eastern Express Highway, Central Railway, Mono Rail, the ongoing Metro Line 2B (D N Nagar to Mandale), and the proposed Metro Line 5 (Thane to Kalyan), Metro Line 6 (Swami Samarth Nagar to Vikhroli) and Metro Line 11 (Wadala to CSMT). It will provide rail based access to the commercial, government bodies and geographical landmarks in Mumbai. It will reduce the current travel time by between 50% and 75% depending on road conditions.

== Widening Project ==
In September 2025 the MMRDA announced that it would be commencing the widening of the highway into a 14-lane carriageway with 7 lanes on either side. The widening is being done to ease traffic congestion on this arterial highway as well as to complement the various other infrastructure developments such as the Metro lines. However, certain politicians and locals are opposing the widening as it would involve the removal of service roads that are used by residential buildings & commercial establishments that line the highway. These individuals fear that removal of service roads would result in increase in risk of accidents, time of commute for such residents along with increased usage of fuel.

The widening project slated to be completed by January 2026 will be unable to meet the deadline due to an oversight in the planning process that failed to account for the shifting of utility lines to either side of the highway. The additional project cost for the shifting is expected to be Rs. 90 Crore.

== Major junctions ==
The following roads either emanate from it or are crossed by it. This list has been separated by district and talukas for easy reading.

Taluka	Distance	Location of Junction	Junction
Thane District
Thane	0 km (0 mi)	Majiwada	National Highway 48
Thane	104 km (65 mi)	Ghodbunder	National Highway 48

== Gallery ==
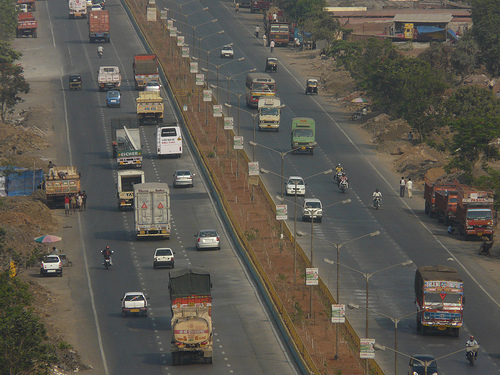
Ghodbunder Road

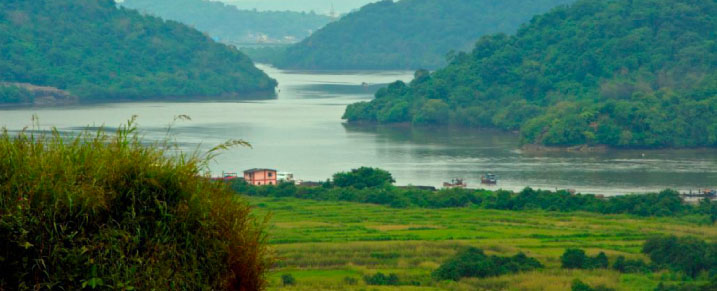
Another View along Ghodbunder Road

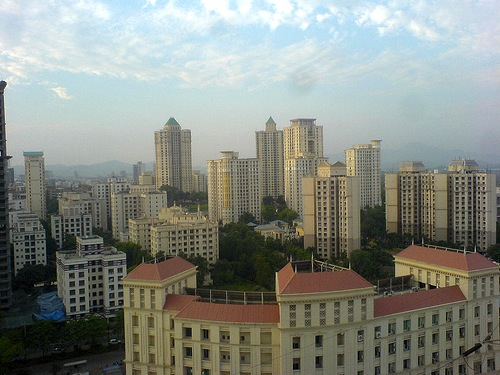
Hiranandani Estate along Ghodbunder Road

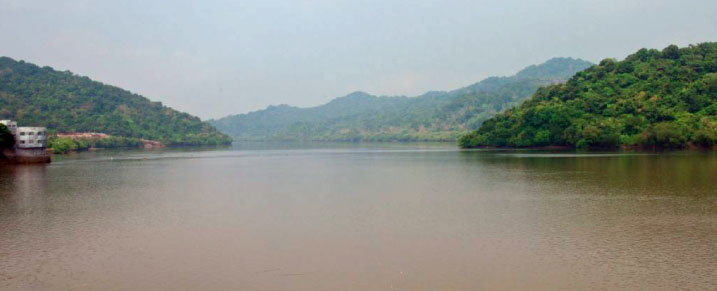
Scenic View along Ghodbunder Road

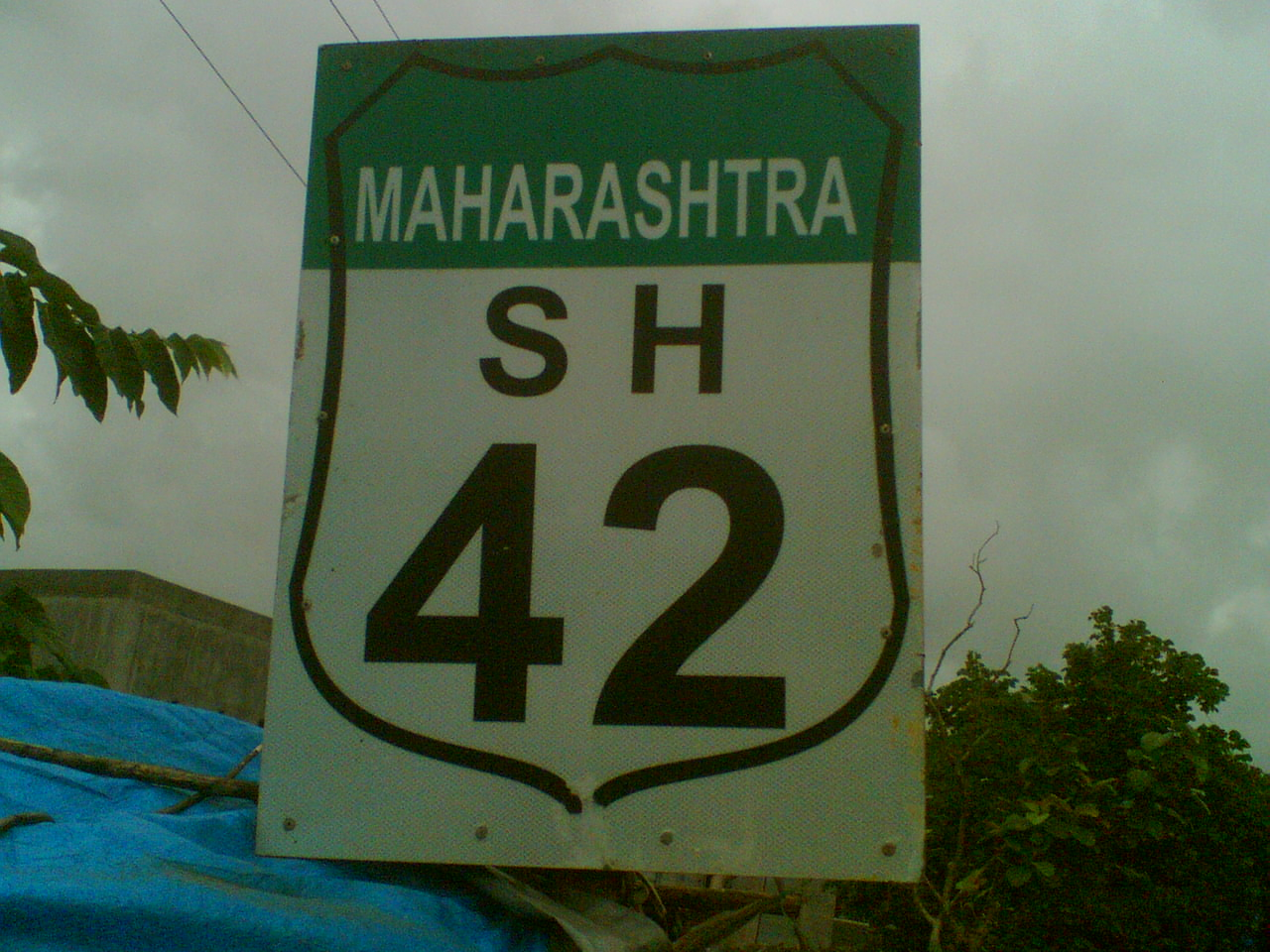
State Highway 42 Shield Marker near Ovale village

== See also ==
- List of state highways in Maharashtra
