= 11 Train =

11 Train may refer to:

- Paris Metro Line 11
- Line 11 (Shanghai Metro)

== See also ==
- Line 11 (disambiguation)
