= Gangadhar (disambiguation) =

Gangadhar or Gangadhara may refer to:

== People ==
- Gangadhar (1936–2003), Indian actor from Karnataka
- Gangadhar Meher (1862–1924), 19th century Odia poet
- Maharaja Gangadhar Rao (1814–1853), 5th raja of Jhansi
- Gangadhara Sastry (born 1967), Indian singer, composer from Andhra Pradesh
- Gangadhar, the alter-ego of the fictional Indian superhero Shaktiman

== Places ==
- Gangadhar, Jhalawar district, Rajasthan
- Gangadhar, Cuttack district, Odisha
- Gangadhar, Cooch Behar district, West Bengal
- Gangadhara, Surat district, Gujarat
- Gangadhara, Karimnagar district, Telangana

== See also ==
- Lokmanya Tilak (disambiguation)
