= Line 11 =

Line 11 may refer to:

== China ==
- Line 11 (Beijing Subway)
- Line 11 (Guangzhou Metro)
- Line 11 (Shanghai Metro)
- Line 11 (Shenzhen Metro)
- Line 11 (Suzhou Metro)
- Line 11 (Wuhan Metro)
- Oceantec Valley Line, Line 11, Qingdao

== India ==
- Line 11 (Mumbai Metro)
- Golden Line (Delhi Metro), Line 10 and Line 11
- Indigo Line (Delhi Metro), an extension of the Green Line (Line 5)

== Spain ==
- Line 11 (Madrid Metro)
- Barcelona Metro line 11

== Other countries ==
- Line 11 (CPTM), São Paulo, Brazil
- Line 11 (Moscow Metro), now the Kakhovskaya line, Russia
- Line 11, part of the Blue Line (Stockholm Metro), in Sweden
- S11 (ZVV), Zurich, Switzerland
- Paris Metro Line 11, France
- SEPTA Route 11, Philadelphia, Pennsylvania, US
- Shah Alam Line, numbered 11, Malaysia
- Tokyo Metro Hanzōmon Line, known as Line 11 in the planning stage, Japan
- Vaudreuil–Hudson line, also designated as line 11, a commuter rail service in Greater Montreal, Quebec

== See also ==
- List of public transport routes numbered 11
