= Shubham =

Given name

Shubham is a male name of Indian-Sanskrit origin that means 'auspicious' or 'good'.

People with the given name include:

- Shubham Agarwal, Indian cricketer
- Shubham Banerjee, designer of the Braigo Braille printer
- Shubham Chaubey, Indian cricketer
- Shubham Desai, Indian cricketer
- Shubham Garhwal, Indian cricketer for the Rajasthan Royals in 2022
- Shubham Jaglan, Indian golfer
- Shubham Kapse, Indian cricketer
- Shubham Khajuria, Indian cricketer
- Shubham Kumar Singh, Indian cricketer
- Shubham Mavi, Indian cricketer
- Shubham Pundir, Indian cricketer
- Shubham Ranjane, Indian cricketer
- Shubham Rathi, Indian social activist
- Shubham Rohilla, Indian cricketer
- Shubham Saraf, British actor
- Shubham Sarangi, Indian footballer
- Shubham Saudiyal, Indian cricketer
- Shubham Sharma (Madhya Pradesh cricketer), Indian cricketer
- Shubham Sharma (Rajasthan cricketer), Indian cricketer
- Shubham Singh, Indian cricketer
- Shubham Thakur, Indian cricketer

== See also ==
- Shubham, a 2006 Kannada film starring Shivadhwaj and Sanjeeda Sheikh
- Shubham Raje Junior College
- Shubham Karoti, a television series on Zee Marathi
