= Lokmanya Tilak (disambiguation) =

Bal Gangadhar Tilak (1856-1920), popularly known as Lokmanya Tilak, was an Indian nationalist and freedom fighter.

Things named for him include:

Education

- Lokmanya Tilak College of Engineering, in Navi Mumbai
- Lokmanya Tilak Municipal Medical College and General Hospital, a general municipal hospital and medical college situated in Sion, Mumbai

Entertainment

- Lokmanya: Ek Yugpurush, a 2015 film by Om Raut
- Lokmanya (TV series), a 2022 Marathi-language TV series

Railway

- Lokmanya Tilak Terminus, a railhead in a suburb of Mumbai
  - Lokmanya Tilak Terminus–Ajni Express
  - Lokmanya Tilak Terminus–Allahabad Duronto Express
  - Lokmanya Tilak Terminus–Azamgarh Weekly Express
  - Lokmanya Tilak Terminus–Darbhanga Pawan Express
  - Lokmanya Tilak Terminus–Ernakulam Duronto Express
  - Lokmanya Tilak Terminus–Hazrat Nizamuddin AC Express
  - Lokmanya Tilak Terminus–Haridwar AC Superfast Express
  - Lokmanya Tilak Terminus–Karaikal Weekly Express
  - Lokmanya Tilak Terminus–Karimnagar Express
  - Lokmanya Tilak Terminus–Secunderabad AC Duronto Express
- Lokmanya Nagar metro station, Nagpur, Maharashtra, India
- Lokmanya Nagar railway station, Madhya Pradesh, India

== See also ==
- Tilak Nagar (disambiguation)
- Lokmanya Nagar, Nagpur, Maharashtra, India
- Devarakonda Balagangadhara Tilak, Indian poet and novelist
