= Patlipada =

- Suburb
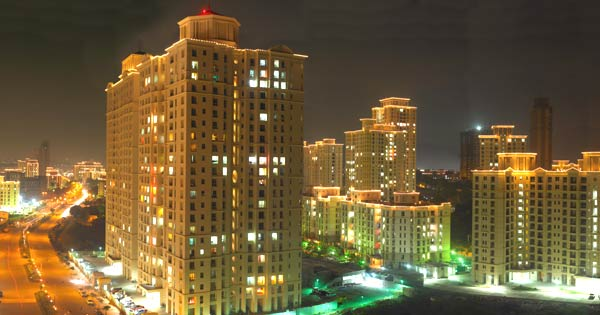
- Hiranandani Estate located in Patlipada at night

- Location in Maharashtra, India
- Coordinates: 19.172431°N 72.957019°E
- Country: India
- State: Maharashtra
- District: Thane

Government
  - Body: Thane Municipal Corporation

Languages
  - Official: Marathi
- Time zone: UTC+5:30 (IST)
- PIN: 400 607
- Telephone code: 022
- Vehicle registration: MH-04
- Nearest city: Mumbai
- Lok Sabha constituency: Thane
- Vidhan Sabha constituency: Thane city (Vidhan Sabha constituency)(Thane)
- Civic agency: Thane Municipal Corporation

Patlipada is a neighbourhood in the Thane city of Maharashtra, India. It has a residential complex and the official residence of the Thane Municipal Commissioner.

Formerly a village, Patilpada finds a mention in the 15th-17th century Marathi-language text Mahikavatichi Bakhar. It was originally known as Pattakil-pada: "Pattakil" (the root of the term Patil) was the designation of the Shilahara officer responsible for tax collection and local administration, while "pada" refers to an administrative unit for tax collection.

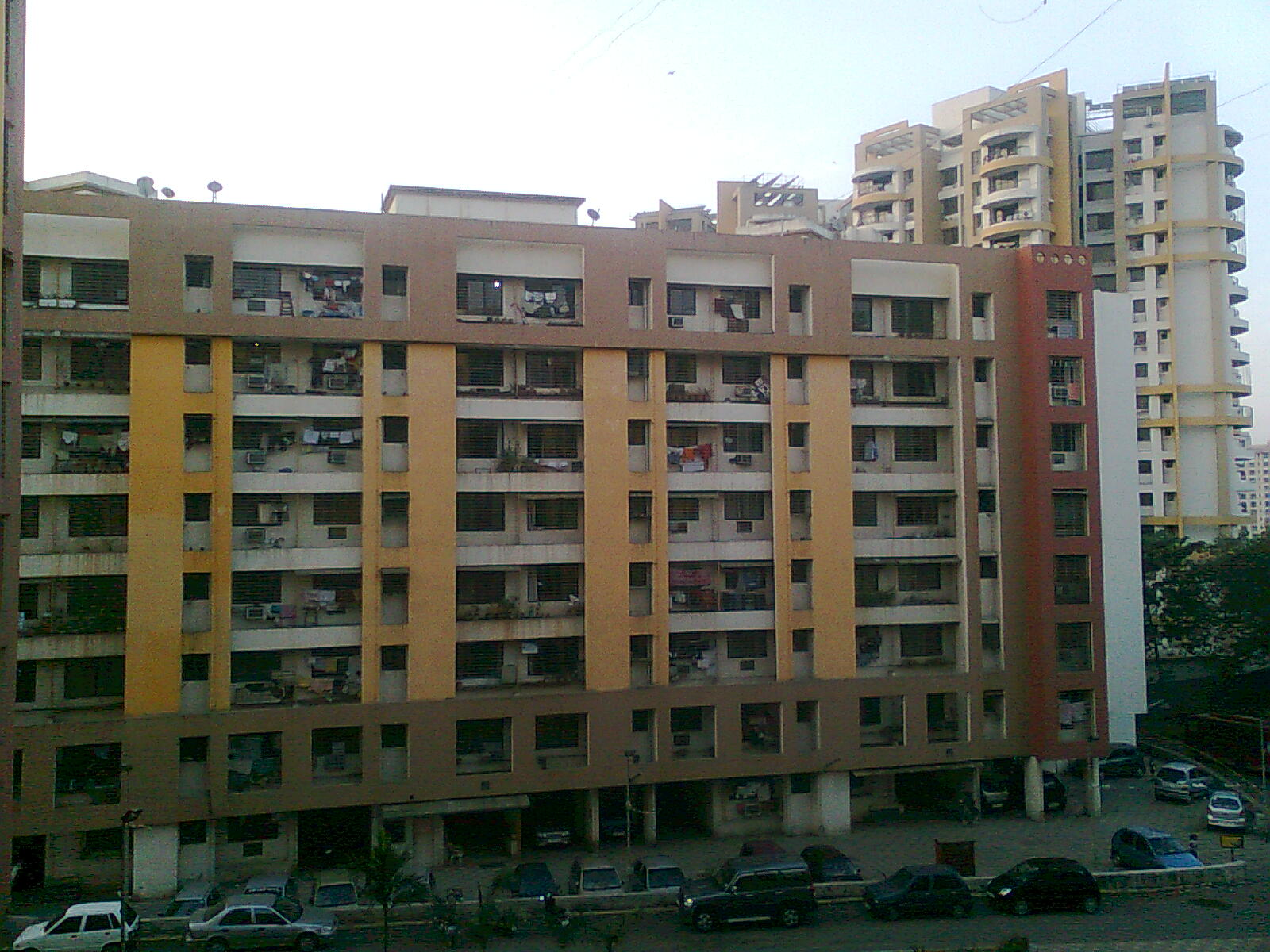
The Rutu Estate with Rutu Towers in Patlipada

== See also ==
- Thane
- Hiranandani Estate
- The Rutu Estate
- Kaasar Vadavali
- Waghbil
- Brahmand
- Pachpakhadi
- Thane Municipal Transport (TMT)
- Transportation in Thane
