= List of public transport routes numbered 11 =

In public transport, Route 11 may refer to:

- London Buses route 11 from Liverpool Street Station to Fulham Broadway Station.
- Melbourne tram route 11, running from West Preston in Melbourne's north to Victoria Harbour Docklands.
- Route 11 (MTA Maryland), a bus route in Baltimore, Maryland and its suburbs.
- SEPTA Route 11, a streetcar in Philadelphia, Pennsylvania and its suburbs.
- West Midlands bus route 11, actually numbered 11A (anticlockwise), 11C (clockwise), and 11E (shortened journeys).

== See also ==
- Line 11 (disambiguation)
