= Vartak Nagar, Thane =

Vartak Nagar
- Locality
- Location in Maharashtra, India
- Coordinates: 19.21°N 72.96°E
- Country: India
- State: Maharashtra
- District: Thane

Languages
  - Official: Marathi
- Time zone: UTC+5:30 (IST)
- Vehicle registration: MH-04-XX-XXXX

Vartak Nagar is a Premium and Posh Area locality in Thane city of Maharashtra state in India. It's nearly 4.3 kilometers from Thane railway station. Pokhran Road No. 1 cuts through this locality to join Pokhran Road No. 2 at Upvan Lake and also via Devdaya Nagar Road. A major part of Vartak Nagar was covered by the 63-acre MHADA colony buildings. But in recent 5-6 years Top Builders have approached to change the look of this area into a transformed Posh, Premium Locality with tall Skyscrapers.

The upcoming Cadbury Junction Metro Station is just 1.5km from this area and Eastern Express Highway Proximity have added a substantial increase in Property Prices.

Vivianna Mall & Korum Mall are very close in a Radius of less than 2km which had given a good lifestyle, Shopping and Entertainment means to the growth and development of this area.

Most of the residents used to work in manufacturing units/factories around Vartak Nagar and other localities. Some of the renowned companies like Raymonds, Kores, Voltas, NRB Bearing, Asiatic gases Blue Star and many others had their units in Vartak Nagar and adjoining areas which has been converted to huge apartment complexes after 2000 A.D.. Adjoining areas would include Shastri Nagar, Samata Nagar, Devdaya Nagar, Shivai Nagar and Yashodhan Nagar/Lokmanya Nagar.

One of the famous landmarks in the area is the Sai Baba Mandir. Schools in this area include Sulochana Devi Singhania High School, Little Flower High School, Brahman Vidyalaya, Smt Savitri Devi Thirani School and College.

The area is gradually undergoing transformation due to redevelopment and new real estate development as well.

Buildings here include Ashar Metro Towers, Raymond Habitat, Dosti Vihar, Kores Towers, Vedant Complex, Puranik Grand Central, Hubtown Greenwoods, Maithili Pride, Devdaya Nagar etc.
