= Upvan Lake =

Lake in India

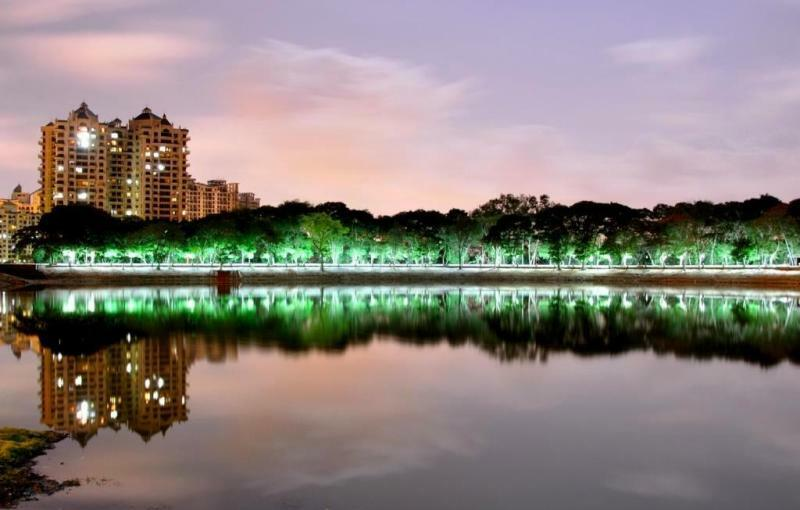

- Location within Maharashtra
- Location: Thane, Maharashtra
- Coordinates: 19°13′17.61″N 72°57′21.65″E
- Basin countries: India
- Surface area: 0.06 km^{2} (0.023 sq mi)

Upvan (or Upavan) Lake is located in Thane in the Indian state of Maharashtra. It is known for hosting the Sanskruti Arts Festival. Here one can also view thousands of Ganpati idols which are brought here for immersion on final day of Ganeshotsav. It was reconstructed by J.K. Singhania for water supply to Raymond textile factory at Vartaknagar (Jekegram). Singhania also constructed the lord Ganesha's temple at Upvan lake. The lake is located near Gawand Baug, Shivai Nagar, Ganesh Nagar, Devdaya Nagar, Vasant Vihar and Vartak nagar. This is one of the recreational areas for people who live in Thane. It is one of the biggest lakes in Thane, surrounded by Yeoor Hills, and lies in the Pokhran-II area. One of the eco friendly lake of city, Upvan Lake is regarded as Thane's ‘lover's paradise’. Upvan lake forms a junction of the Pokhran I and Pokhran II roads. Once, the major source of water for the entire Thane city, Upvan lake is now used primarily for recreation. The official residence of the Mayor of Thane Municipal Corporation lies adjacent to the lake.

Upvan was decorated during Sanskruti Arts Festival 2015. Over 50,000 people visit the lake during the festival.

== Gallery ==
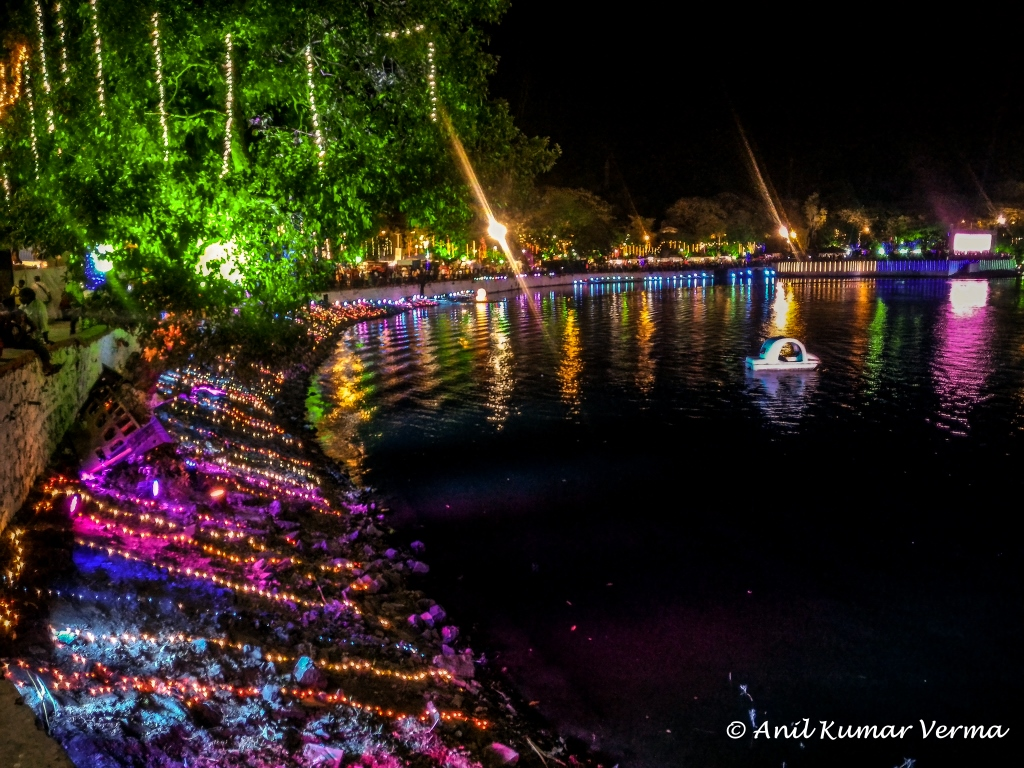
Lit up for Sanskruti Arts Festival in 2015

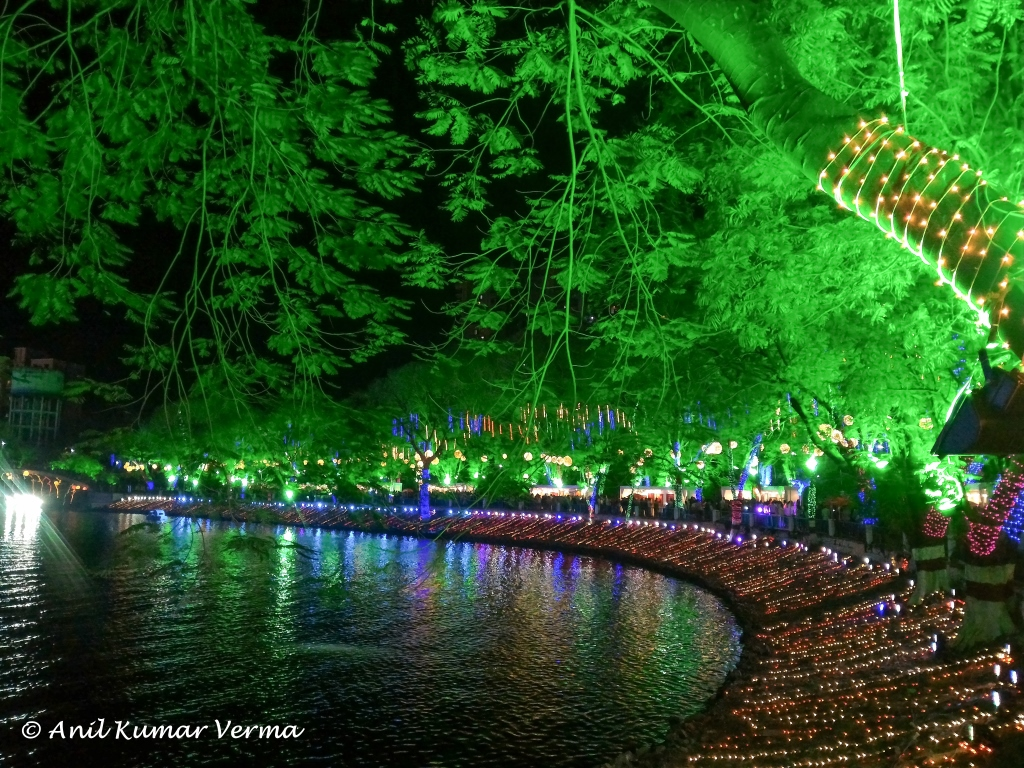
Lit up for Sanskruti Arts Festival in 2015

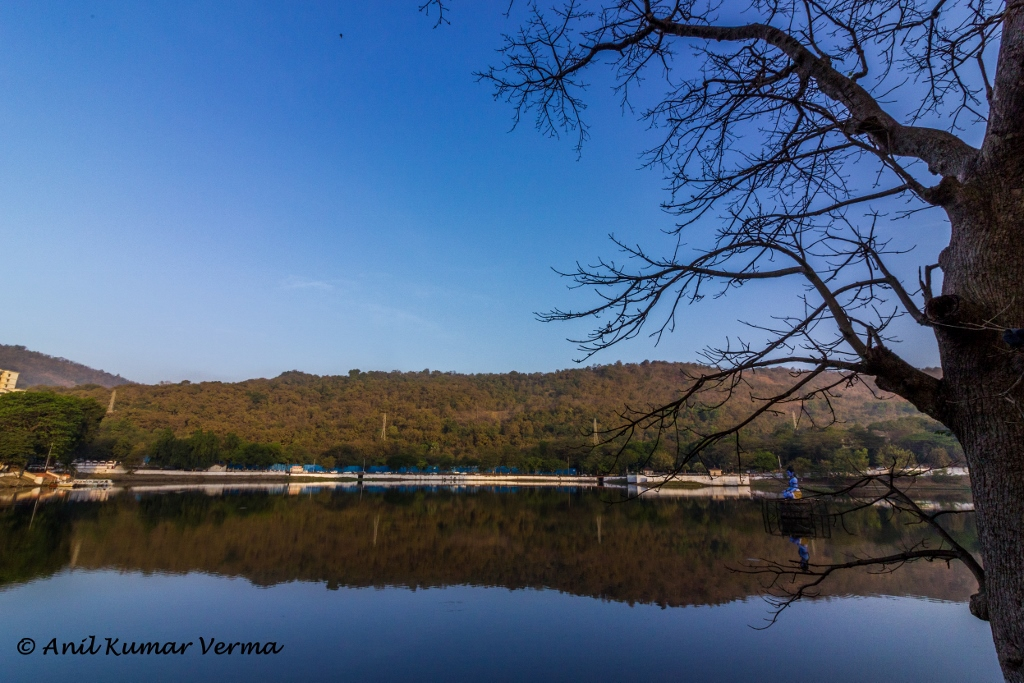
The lake in morning

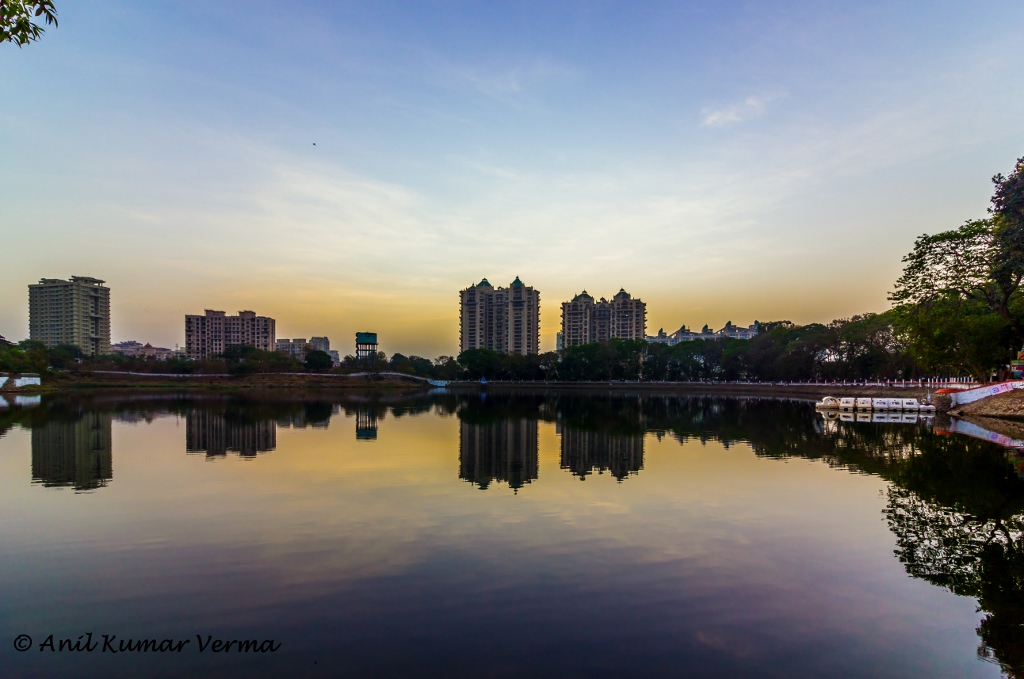
