= Kolshet =

Coordinates: 19°14′28″N 72°59′23″E

Kolshet is a locality in Thane.

== Infrastructure ==
The road approaching Kolshet is known as Kolshet Road. Kolshet connects Eastern Express Highway to Western Express Highway and acts as a bypass to Ghodbunder Road. One can travel to Kolshet by TMT buses.

Kolshet is pretty much in a developing stage as compared to Ghodbunder Road. Kolshet creek is also known as 'Retibunder' as sand for construction is supplied from this place. The place has industries like SYNTEL, Clariant Chemicals, Wool Research Center and Navnit Motors.

The residential complexes here are Everest World, Puraniks Kavyadhara, Highland Builders, Devashree Park, Siddheswhwar Gardens, Unnathi Woods, Vraj Green Valley, Regency Heights, Runwal Pearl, Runwal Garden City, Mayfair Meridian, Vakratund Residency and many more. Residential property rates for Kolshet Road in January 2014 were around Rs 8600 to Rs 9950.

Nearest schools in Kolshet are Kendriya Vidyalaya at Air Force station, Blossom High School at Everest World, Universal High School at Brahmand. The Thane Sub Campus of the University of Mumbai was also established in 2014.

Nearest hospitals include Jupiter Hospital at Majiwada and Hiranandani Hospital at Hiranandani Estate.

Maruti car service center by Navnit Motors
