= Line 11 (Mumbai Metro) =

Metro line in Maharashtra, India

Line 11 is a Mumbai Metro line which when completed run from Bandra Terminus to Gateway of India via Dharavi, Wadala Depot, Sewri, and CSMT. It was originally announced as an extension of the Green Line, but was expanded multiple times. In May 2025, it was announced that the line would be independent.

== History ==
=== Green Line Integration ===
Initially, Line 11 was announced as an extension of the Green Line, with a proposal for 2 elevated stations and 8 underground sections running from Wadala to the CSMT. The Maharashtra government assigned the task of executing the project to MMRDA. However, very early on, the project was transferred from the MMRDA to the MMRCL. This change in implementing agency saw the line being completely reworked. MMRCL announced a new alignment for the line, taking a more central route south of Byculla. The rework saw the line being converted to that of a spur line rather than a natural extension of the Green Line. MMRCL also announced the line would now have 16 stations, of which 15 were underground and 1 was at grade. In addition, the addition of new stations and the extension of the line beyond CSMT and would now terminate at the Gateway of India. Soon, following public consultations the stations at Reay Road and Crawford Market were dropped while several other stations were renamed or moved around. The line construction estimates were also doubled from Rs.8,739 crore to Rs.16,000 crore.

=== Transition to its own Line ===
In May 2025, as part of the Dharavi redevelopment project, it was proposed that the northern spur of Line 11 be extended from Anik Nagar Bus Depot to Dharavi via Sion. This proposal was part of the Dharavi redevelopment project, which included efforts to turn Dharavi into a transportation hub in Mumbai. However, following a state government directive in March 2026, MMRCL announced the line would now be an independent line (thus abandoning any correlation with the green line) and would now run from Bandra Terminus to Gateway of India via Dharavi, Wadala Depot, Sewri, and CSMT.

== Stations ==
Line 11
#	Station		Opened	Interchange	Alignment
#	English	Marathi	Opened	Interchange	Alignment
1	Bandra Terminus	वांद्रे टर्मिनस	Proposed	None	To Be Decided
2	Bandra	वांद्रे	Proposed	Harbour Western	To Be Decided
3	Central Dharavi	मध्य धारावी	Proposed	None	To Be Decided
4	Sion	सायन	Proposed	None	To Be Decided
5	Chunabhatti	चुनाभट्टी	Proposed	None	To Be Decided
6	Anik Nagar Bus Depot	आणिक नगर बस डेपो	Approved	Green Line 4	At Grade
7	Wadala Depot	वडाळा डेपो	Approved	None	Underground
8	CGS Colony	सीजीएस कॉलनी	Approved	Mumbai Monorail	Underground
9	Ganesh Nagar	गणेश नगर	Approved	None	Underground
10	BPT Hospital	बीपीटी हॉस्पिटल	Approved	None	Underground
11	Sewri	शिवडी	Approved	Harbour	Underground
12	Hay Bunder	गवत बंदर	Approved	None	Underground
13	Darukhana	दारुखाना	Approved	None	Underground
14	Byculla	भायखळा	Approved	Central	Underground
15	Nagpada Junction	नागपाडा जंक्शन	Approved	None	Underground
16	Bhendi Bazaar	भेंडी बाजार	Approved	None	Underground
17	Chhatrapati Shivaji Maharaj Terminus	छत्रपती शिवाजी महाराज टर्मिनस	Approved	Aqua Line 3 Central Harbour	Underground
18	Horniman Circle	हॉर्निमन सर्कल	Approved	None	Underground
19	Gateway of India	गेटवे ऑफ इंडिया	Approved	None	Underground
