= Ghodbunder Fort =

Hill fort in Thane, Maharashtra, India

- Ghodbunder, Thane District, Maharashtra, India
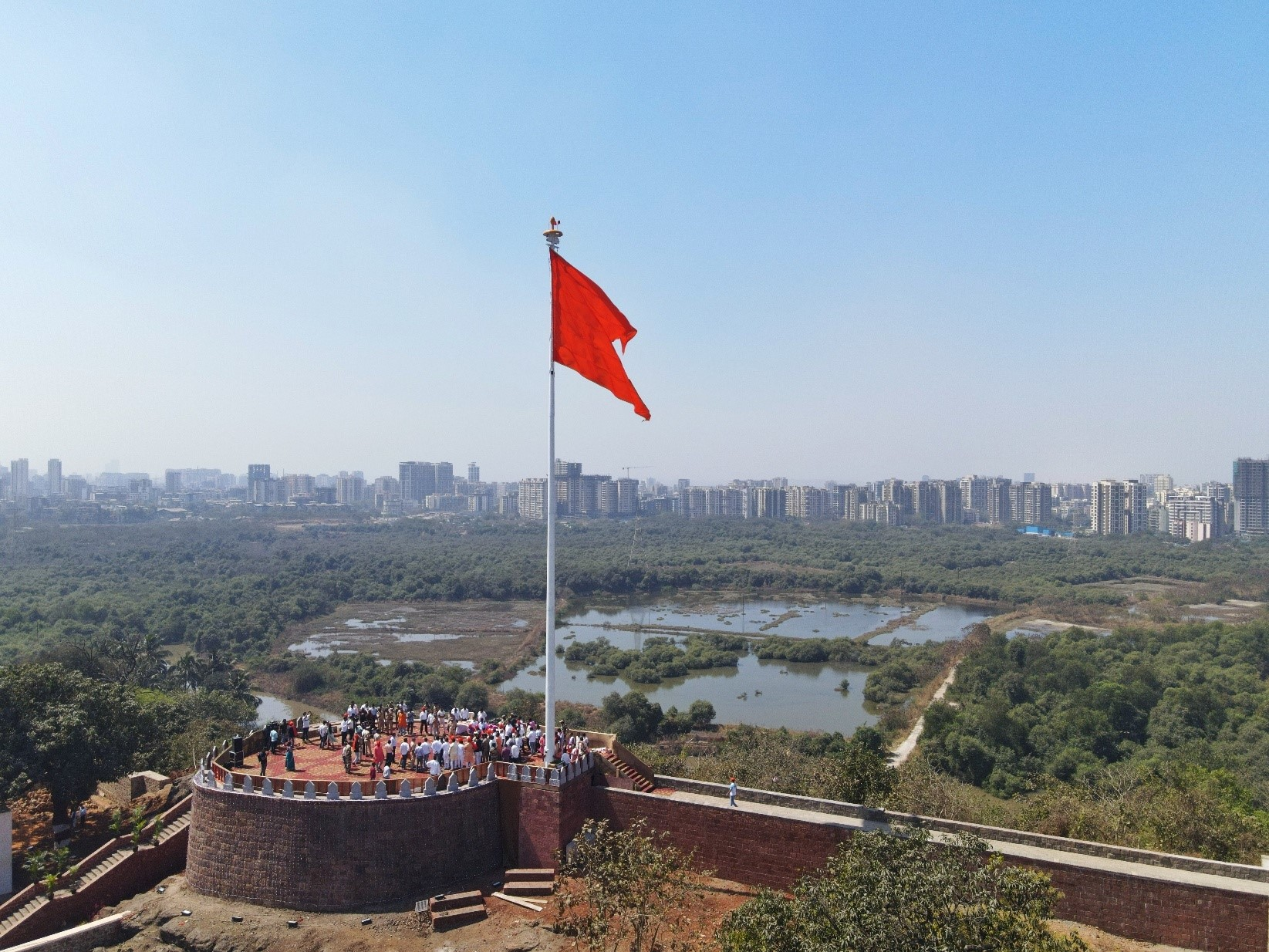
- Ramparts of the Ghodbunder Fort overlooking the Ulhas creek

Site information
- Type: Hill Fort; Land battery
- Owner: Portuguese Empire (1550–1737): Maratha Kingdom (1737–1818); East India Company (1818–1947); Government of India (1947- Present)
- Open to the public: Yes
- Condition: Under restoration

Location
- Coordinates: 19.2962°N 72.8883°E

Site history
- Built: Fortifications in 1550; 476 years ago, Current fort built in 1730; 296 years ago
- Materials: Red Laterite and Lime mortar

Ghodbunder Fort is a fort located in Ghodbunder Village, Thane, Maharashtra, India, on the hill just south of the Ulhas River. It was built by the Portuguese and then occupied by the Marathas, before being used as the East India Company's district headquarters. The place was called Ghodbunder because it was where the Portuguese used to trade for ghode (horses) with the Arabs. Hence the name Ghodbunder: ghode (horses) + bunder (port).

== History ==
The Ghodbunder village is mentioned in the 15th-17th century Marathi-language text Mahikavatichi Bakhar; the name indicates the existence of a horse (ghod) trading port (bunder) there.

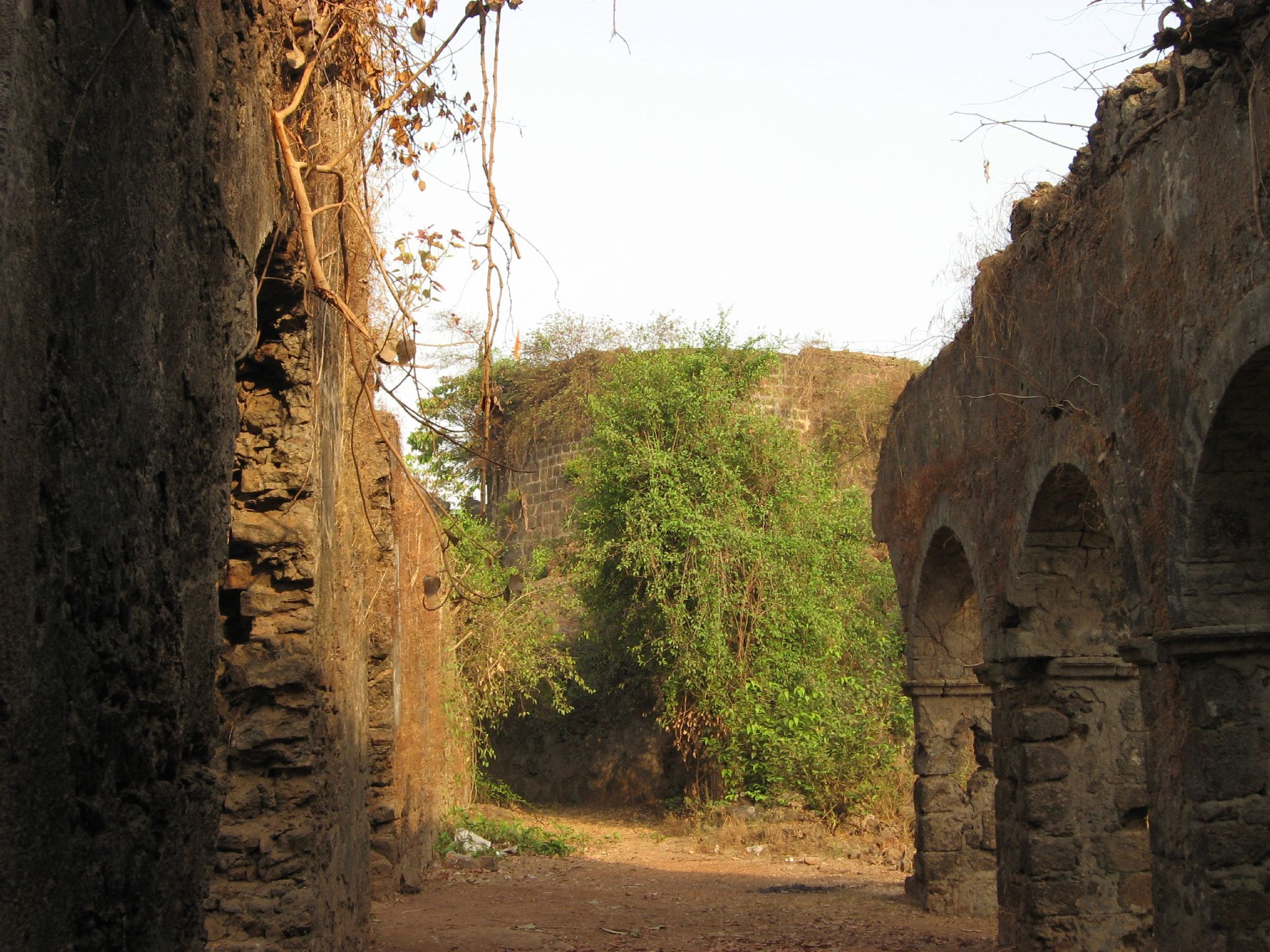
Ghodbunder fort bastion and walls

In 1530 the Portuguese arrived in Thane, and began fortifying the hill area as early as 1550. There are many old maps and texts which mention continual attempts by the Marathas to capture the fort, which the Portuguese had named 'Cacabe de Tanna'. The Portuguese were able to successfully defend these attacks for many years, including an attack in 1672 by the forces of Shivaji Maharaj. The fort as it seen today was completed in 1730 and the church in the fort still stands, and is now used as a hotel. The fort remained under Portuguese rule until the Marathas, under military commander Chimaji Appa, successfully besieged the fort and took it over from the Portuguese in 1737. Following its capture, Shahu I ordered the strengthening of the fortifications, initiating the construction of the tower.

In 1818, the British occupied the fort and made it the headquarters of the district administration for the East Indian Company, with a district collector stationed in Thane.

Although the fort currently lies in ruins, the government of India set out plans for its renovation in 2014, including the beautification and landscaping of approximately 4 acres of surrounding land. The fort itself is under the control of the Archaeological Survey of India (ASI).

== Restoration ==
Under the Government of Maharashtra; Department of Cultural Affairs; Directorate of Archaeology and Museums' 'Adopt the Monument Scheme' the fort was adopted by the Mira-Bhayandar Municipal Corporation. The State Archaeology appointed SANKRAMAN Design Studio as the heritage conservation architect. They are empanelled architects with Mira-Bhayandar Municipal Corporation & also empanelled as heritage conservation architects with the Directorate of Archaeology and Museums. There have been multiple interventions during the restoration process. On 22-Jun-2024 a new discovery was made when an unknown and lost underground chamber was discovered. The scientific excavation is on-going.
