= Waghbil =

- town
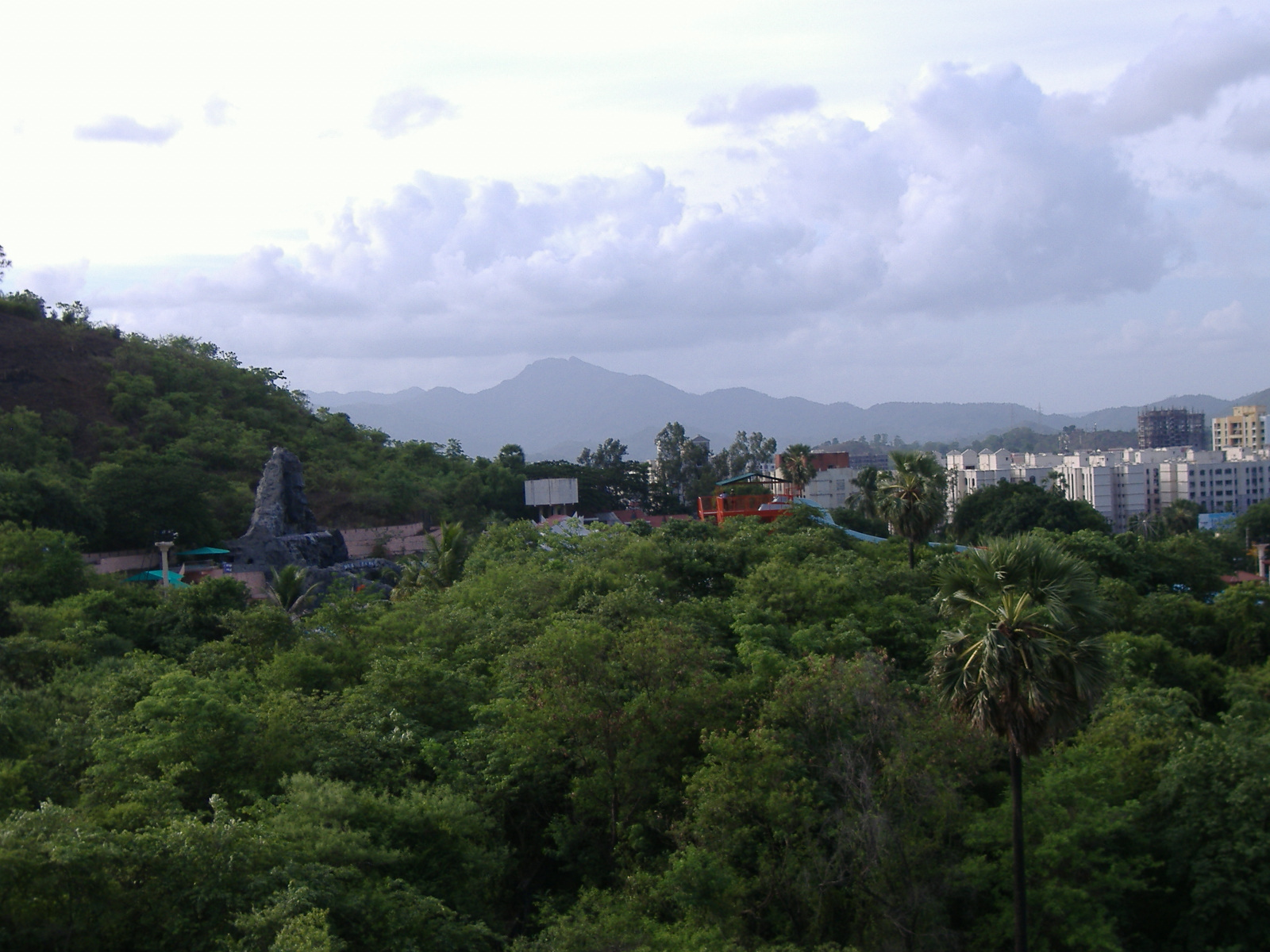

- Locationi in Maharashtra, India
- Coordinates: 19.266°N 72.985°E
- Country: India
- State: Maharashtra
- District: Thane

Languages
  - Official: Marathi
- Time zone: UTC+5:30 (IST)

Waghbil is an area of Thane city, located in the Mumbai Metropolitan Region in the state of Maharashtra, India. Before 1991, Waghbil was considered to be a village but has since been absorbed into Thane city. Waghbil is close to Sanjay Gandhi national Park, Thane Creek. The Hiranandani Estate is one of the adjoining localities to Waghbil.

Waghbil has existed since at least the 15th century, as evident by its mention in the Marathi-language text Mahikavatichi Bakhar.

== Transportation ==
Waghbil Naka, in the outer part of Waghbil, is major bus stop served by many routes. It also has a rickshaw stand.

Waghbil is located about 2 kilometers from Ghodbunder Road highway, the MH SH 42. Waghbil Naka can also be reached by the MH SH 42 via the via Waghbil Naka flyover. Waghbil is approximately 6 kilometers from Thane railway station.

== Housing ==
The residential complexes Vijay Nagri, Prestige Residency, Vijay Nagri Annex, Sukhsagar Residency, Swastik Regalia, Green Acres, and Vasant Leela are situated here. Waghbil Residents Group comprises members from over 25 housing societies in the area. This group works on finding solutions to civic concerns and developing best practices to make Wagahbil.

== Economy and demographics ==
Fishery and farming of rice are the major occupations of this village. It is one of the few areas in the region where red rice is farmed. Rice bread, steamed rice with meat and fish is their daily diet. Villagers are also involved under business in building material chain. Under which they are providing creek sand and metal stone to local construction projects.

Waghbil has many Aagri residents, a community mostly found in Maharashtra. Aaagari Vikas Samajik Sanstha is an active non-governmental organization in Waghbil village which was formed in 2010 by the villagers of Waghbil for the betterment of local people.

== Traditions and celebrations ==
Villagers celebrate Ganesh Utsav, Gopal Kala, Navratri, Hanuman Jayanti and Ram Navmi festivals. Villagers also participate every year in a Shirdi pilgrimage after Diwali.

Waghabil Fair is a four-day funfair attended by people from surrounding villages. Mr. Tulshiram Shinge (Senior Social Worker) confirms, Vaishakh Poarnima has first day of Waghbil Fair. On the first day of fair the goddess is worshiped "Mahadu Aai". Second day of the goddess is worshiped "Mari Aai". Villagers organize "Kushti Competition" (कुस्ती स्पर्धा)on the third day. On this occasion many people do travel to participate and watch this competition. This funfair ends on Sanakshti Chaturthi. The main foods eaten are mutton, chicken, and baked bhakris.

As per Bandhu Gharat (civilian), a local villager built "Mahadu Aai" temple in a night by for devotion of the goddess.

== Amenities ==
Suraj Water park is situated in Waghbil Naka, and is the only water park in Thane.
