= Kasarvadavali =

Village in Maharashtra

Kasarvadavali Kasarvadavali
- Location within Mumbai Location within Maharashtra Location within India
- Coordinates: 19.271322°N 72.96894°E
- Country: India
- State: Maharashtra
- District: Thane
- Taluka: Thane

Languages
  - Official: Marathi
- Time zone: UTC+5:30 (IST)
- PIN: 400615
- Vehicle registration: MH-04

Kasarvadavali is a region located on Ghodbunder Road of Thane city in Maharashtra state in India. The area lying between the regions of Waghbil and Bhainderpada is called Kasarvadavali or simply Vadavali. The area has seen massive population growth with a lot of new residential and commercial projects being completed in the last decade, along with the rise of commercial activity.

Kasar-vadavali is mentioned in the 15th-17th century Marathi-language text Mahikavatichi Bakhar; the name indicates the existence of a copper utensil and bangle making industry there.
