= Panchpakhadi =

Pachpakhadi पाचपाखडी
- Locality
- Location in Mumbai
- Coordinates: 19.1954727°N 72.9652491°E
- Country: India
- State: Maharashtra
- District: Thane

Pachpakhadi पा़चपाखाडी (Marathi) is an upmarket and affluent locality of Thane city of Maharashtra state in India.

Panchpakhadi is mentioned in the 15th-17th century Marathi-language text Mahikavatichi Bakhar as the location of the royal palace of the Bimb dynasty. The name derives from the words "panch" (five) and "pakhadi" (small village).

== Location ==
It lies next to Naupada and Teen Hath Naka, within walking distance from Thane railway station.
