= Chikhale =

Chikhale may refer to:

- Chikhale, Panvel, a village in Raigad district of Maharashtra, India
- Chikhale, Dahanu, a village in Palghar district of Maharashtra, India
