= Chikhale, Panvel =

Village in Maharashtra, India

Chikhale
- village
- Location in Maharashtra, India Chikhale (India)
- Coordinates: 18.977159°N 73.156736°E
- Country: India
- State: Maharashtra
- District: Raigad

Languages
  - Official: Marathi
- Time zone: UTC+5:30 (IST)
- PIN: 410221
- Vehicle registration: MH-
- Nearest city: Panvel

Chikhale is a village in Panvel taluka of Raigad district in Maharashtra state in India. It is located at a distance of 6.2 km from its Taluk headquarters Panvel and 33 km distance from Mumbai City.

Chikhale has a railway station on the Panvel-Karjat route of the Mumbai Suburban Railway in Navi Mumbai, India with the same name. Panvel is the previous station and Poyanje is the next station. It is followed by Chowk Railway Station and then Karjat.
