= Panvel railway station =

Railway station in Mumbai, India

Panvel

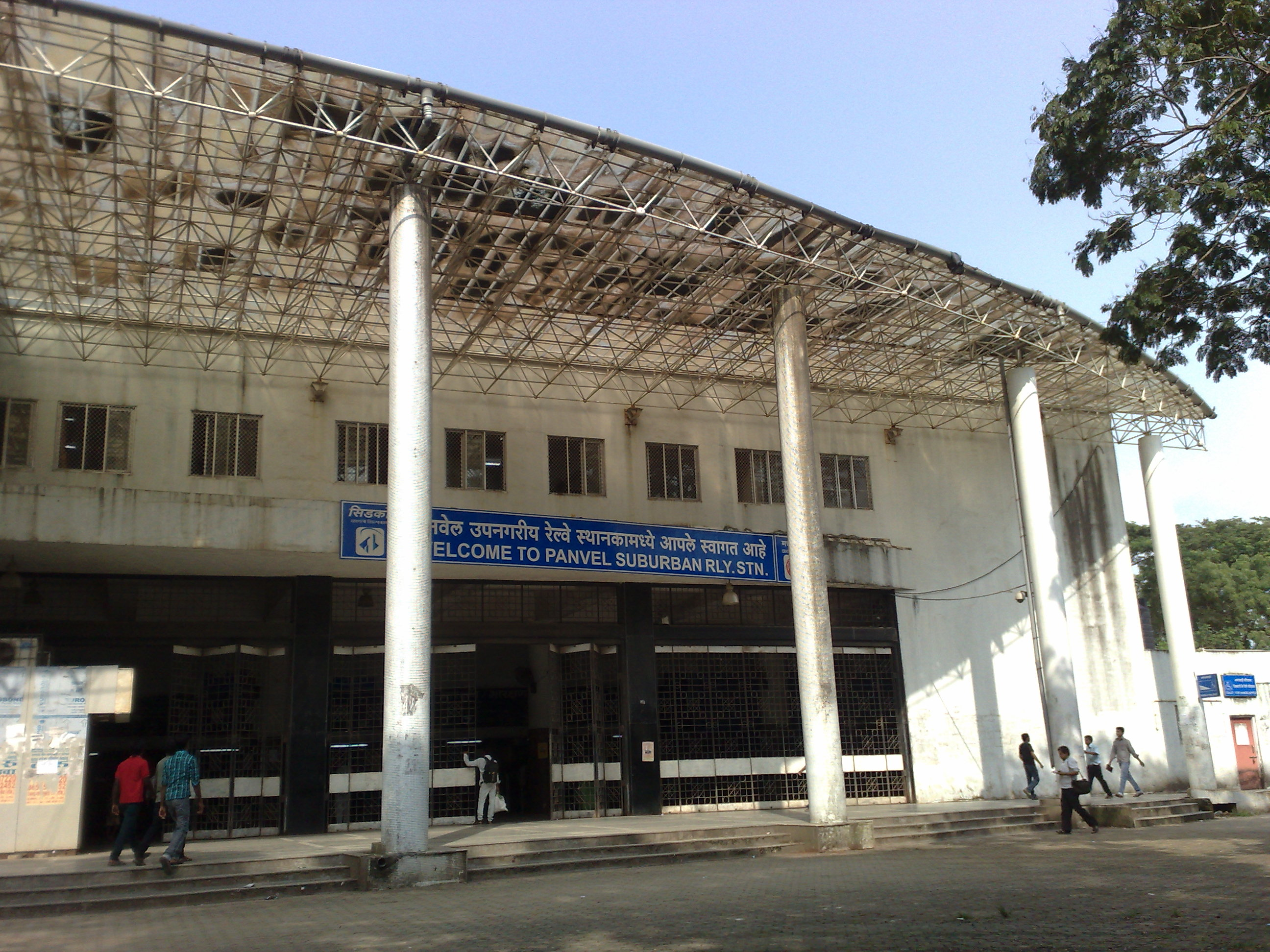
- Panvel railway station – Old suburban entrance

General information
- Location: Panvel - Navi Mumbai
- Coordinates: 18.98932°N 73.12229°E
- Elevation: 12.175 metres (39.94 ft)
- System: Mumbai Suburban Railway station
- Owner: Ministry of Railways, Indian Railways and CIDCO
- Lines: Harbour line, Trans-Harbour line, Vasai Road–Roha line, Panvel-Karjat Railway Corridor
- Platforms: 7 (including 4 island platform and 3 end platform)+3 (under construction)
- Tracks: 10

Construction
- Structure type: Standard on-ground station
- Parking: Yes

Other information
- Status: Active
- Station code: PL (suburban); PNVL (mainline)
- Zone(s): Central Railway
- Division(s): Mumbai CR

History
- Opened: 1962

Passengers
- 2012-13: 1,06,736
Route map
Location
- Location within India

Panvel railway station, station code: PL (suburban)/PNVL (mainline) is a railway station on the Harbour line and Transharbour line of the Mumbai Suburban Railway network, in India.

The station inter-connects to the proposed Navi Mumbai International Airport. Panvel station was originally opened as a rail freight transport in 1962, for limited service to Diva Junction railway station. Regular commuter service began in 1964 for passengers headed to Khopoli.

Inbound and outbound trains share a twelve-car platform on the inbound track, requiring Panvel passengers to embark or debark from the forthcoming coaches of outbound trains or the rear coaches of inbound trains. Panvel also serves a parallel route for Karjat which is known as the Panvel–Karjat route. The route has been set up for cargo services travelling from Karjat} to Navi Mumbai. An in-development terminus of the station had been proposed in 2007.

The Navi Mumbai Municipal Transport buses from the station run in both Old and New Panvel. It is expected to increase ridership at Old Panvel from 94% total daily boardings and alightings. After the success of the bus services, NMMT proposed to expand the bus services from the station.

It had 4 platforms for suburban traffic, of which 2 have been closed for the WDFC. As a replacement, 2 more platforms (with one additional track to serve as the extra platform) have been constructed in the west of the station. 2 of these (constructed to the southwest) will serve as termini for the Panvel-Karjat Railway Corridor, which is yet to open as of July 2026. The other extra track (constructed to the far west) is active and serves as a terminus platform for the existing suburban line.

The remaining 3 are for the mainline Central Railways. PF 5 is for trains going towards Diva/Vasai Road/Kalyan. PF 6 is for trains terminating here, trains going towards Roha, or trains going to Vasai Road/Kalyan/Diva. PF 7 is for trains going towards Roha and the Konkan railway line.

It handles 2 Rajdhani Expresses:

- 12431/12432 Thiruvananthapuram Rajdhani Express
- 22413/22414 Madgaon Rajdhani Express

Both of these run on the Konkan Railway line.

== History ==
=== Inauguration ===
The station was introduced as the Panvel–Diva railway line, serving as rail freight transport in 1962 and was used for cargo services. The Indian Railways ministry had commissioned the independent commuter railway services in 1964. In addition, a number of development activities have been conducted, including track expansions, electrification of the coaches, and addition of long-route express trains.

=== Proposed terminus development ===
In 2007, the Central Railways ministries had proposed to develop a terminus, serving the inbound and outbound long-distance express trains. According to the general manager, V. K. Kaul, it was announced that the project will be developed with an expenditure of ₹22 crore (US$2.3 million). City and Industrial Development Corporation (CIDCO) stated that the corporation also has a two-thirds expenditure on the project, and the CR has the major expenditure plan. However, in 2015 the project was re-announced with a total expenditure of ₹126 crore (US$13 million) from the CR ministries. The CR ministries also stated that the development of the terminus will be completed in 2018. The terminus also consists two separate platforms for the express trains.

== Major trains ==
There are three major long-distance trains that originate from Panvel Junction:

- 11031/11032 Panvel–Alipurduar Amrit Bharat Express
- 15065/15066 Gorakhpur–Panvel Express (via Barhni)
- 17613/17614 Panvel–Hazur Sahib Nanded Express

== Services and further development ==
=== CIDCO Corridor Project ===
CIDCO has implemented a six-corridor railway project, including the Mankhurd–Belapur–Panvel Railway Line and the Panvel/Belapur–Uran Railway Line. The project will be developed with an expenditure on a ratio of 67:33; ₹466 crore (US$48 million) from Indian Railways and ₹946 crore (US$98 million) from CIDCO, covering a length of 200 kilometres (120 mi) and occupying 900 hectares of land.

The Mankhurd–Belapur–Panvel Railway Corridor Line was first commissioned on 25 January 1995 as a single line connecting to Khandeshwar station from CBD Belapur station. The line was subsequently expanded to Panvel on 29 June 1998. On 14 April 2000, the line got subsequently expanded as double line services from Chhatrapati Shivaji Maharaj Terminus to Panvel.

The Panvel/Belapur–Uran Corridor Line was originally planned in 1996, but later it was halted for unknown reasons in 2008. According to the 2009 reports, the expenses of the project was around ₹1,412.17 crore (US$150 million), including the expenses of constructing foot-over bridges and installation of railway network for Belapur station from the proposed station Sagarganga (Kille). The planned stations between the route including Seawoods Darave, Sagar Sangam, Targhar, Bamandongri, Kharkopar, Gavhan, Shematikhar, Nhava Sheva, Dronagiri and Uran with a length of 27 kilometres (17 mi), will be developed in the first phase of the project in 2017. Due to the scarcity of the land required for the tracks development, a 4 kilometres (2.5 mi) of forest land between Gavhan and Shematikhar stations will be acquired by the corporation for phase 2 of the development.

=== Implementation of shuttle train services ===
In 2006, the Central Railways ministries had proposed the shuttle train services between Karjat station and Panvel. The plan was implemented as the cargo service trains use the single track of the Panvel–Karjat route. In October 2015, the shuttle train services were started between Diva station and Panvel on the trial basis. Due to the establishment of shuttle train services, the commuters from the New Panvel can travel directly to Diva. A new shuttle train service is going to be commissioned between Panvel and Bhiwandi/Vasai/Virar, which is a 70 km project. Currently, there are 13 stations on this route. 11 more stations are to be built after the project commences.

=== Track elevation ===
In 2012, CIDCO had proposed a 25 kilometres (16 mi) metro corridor of Navi Mumbai Metro, linking from Belapur to the proposed Navi Mumbai International Airport.

However, in January 2016, the CST-Panvel elevated corridor project was proposed by Mumbai Railway Vikas Corporation (MVRC) to connect the route along Palm Beach Marg to the proposed international airport. The corridor, although originally proposed to link the parallel route between Reay Road and Panvel. The report was revised in February 2016 of the project and stated that the corridor will be integrated with the Navi Mumbai Metro, connecting the Chhatrapati Shivaji International Airport to the proposed airport.

In June 2014, it was announced that the Panvel–Karjat route will get a track extension under phase 3 of the Mumbai Urban Transport Project scheme with an expenditure of ₹1,809 crore (US$190 million). In February 2015, MVRC approved the extension of tracks with an expenditure of ₹2,024 crore (US$210 million); reducing the distance of the route to 78 kilometres (48 mi).

== Bus connections ==
The station serves as the major hub for the Navi Mumbai Municipal Transport (NMMT) bus routes serving the Navi Mumbai areas. In August 2015, NMMT and Panvel City Municipal Corporation (PCMC) had implemented to start the bus services serving the three major parts of the city from the station, including Sai Nagar, Uran Naka and Palaspa Phata.

Route (from)	Bus no.	Route (to)
Panvel station	111	Mantralaya, Mumbai
Vichumbe village	59	Khandeshwar railway station (via New Panvel(east))
Panvel station	75	Sai Nagar(Old Panvel)
Panvel station	76	Karanjade

== Gallery ==
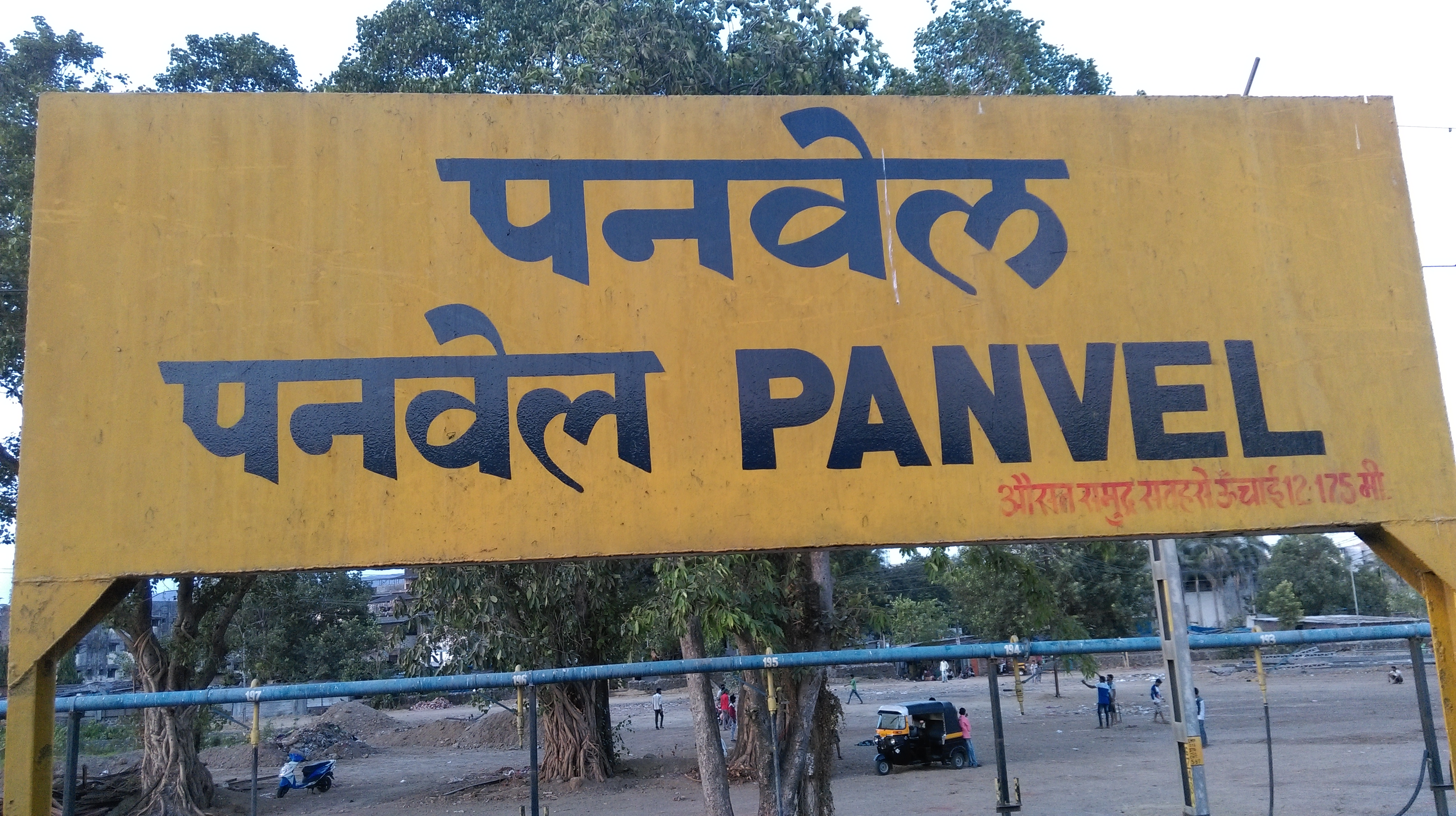
Panvel railway station – Outstation station board

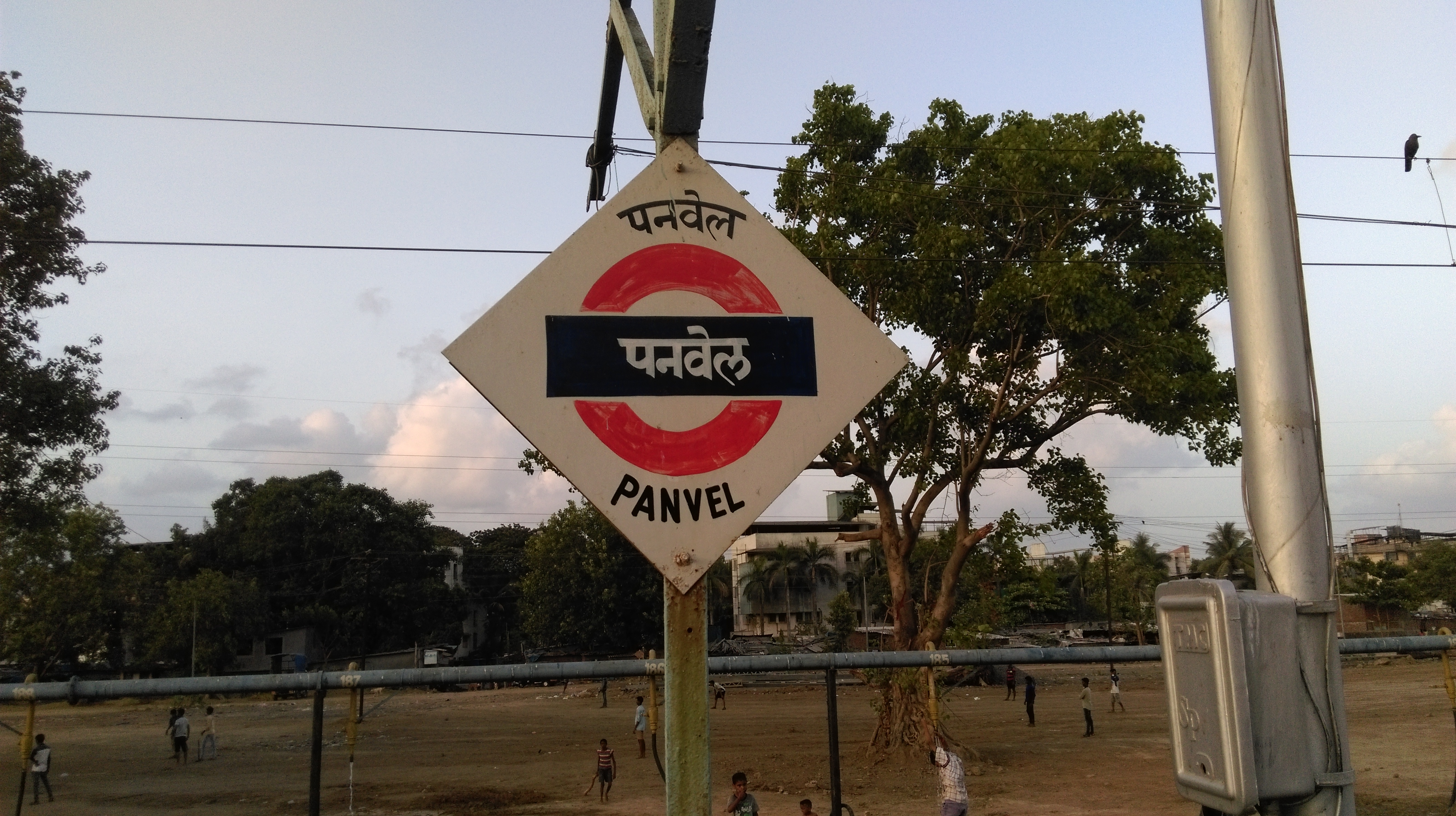
Panvel railway station – Platform board

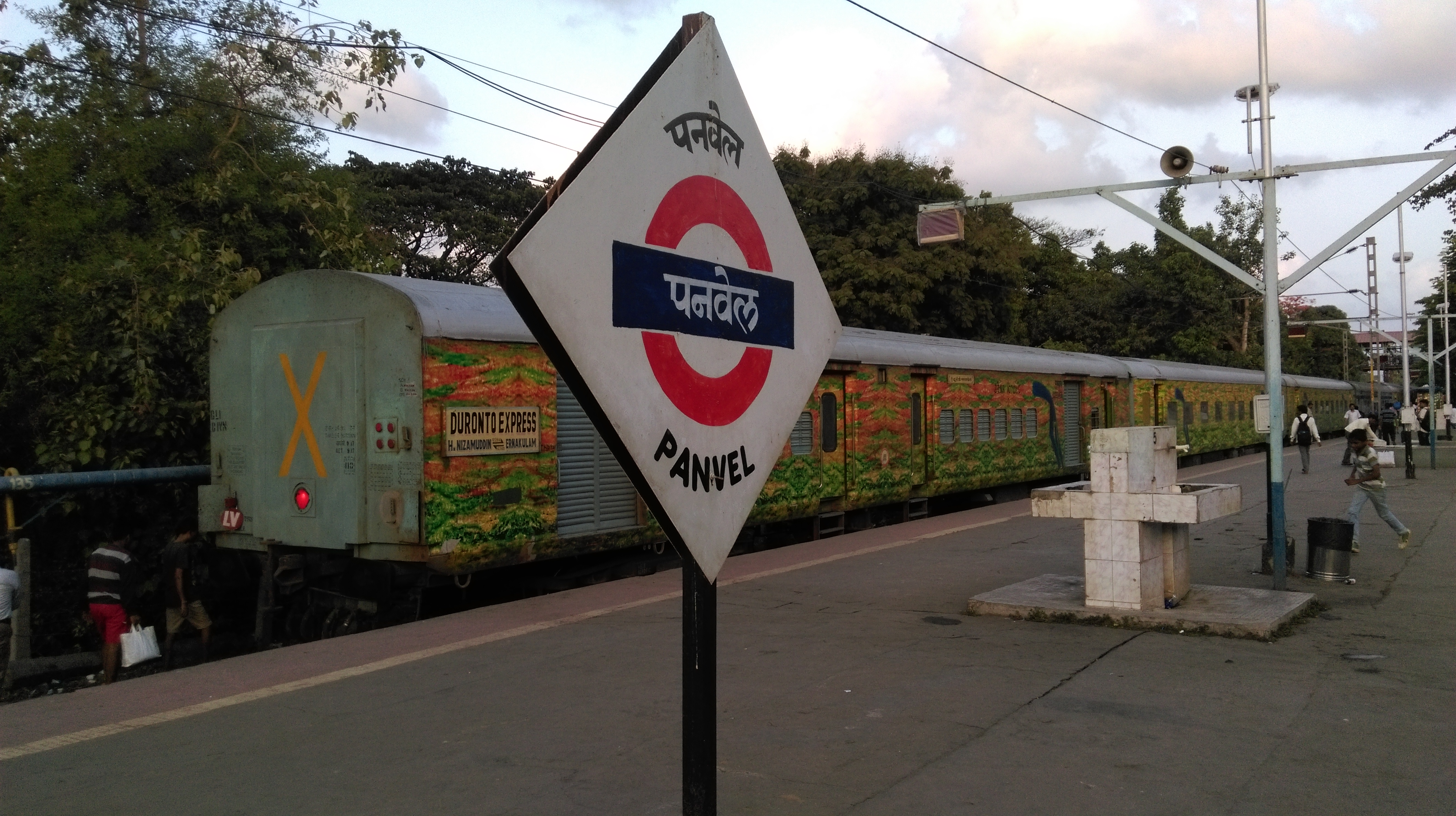
Ernakulam–H.Nizamuddin Duronto Express at Panvel railway station

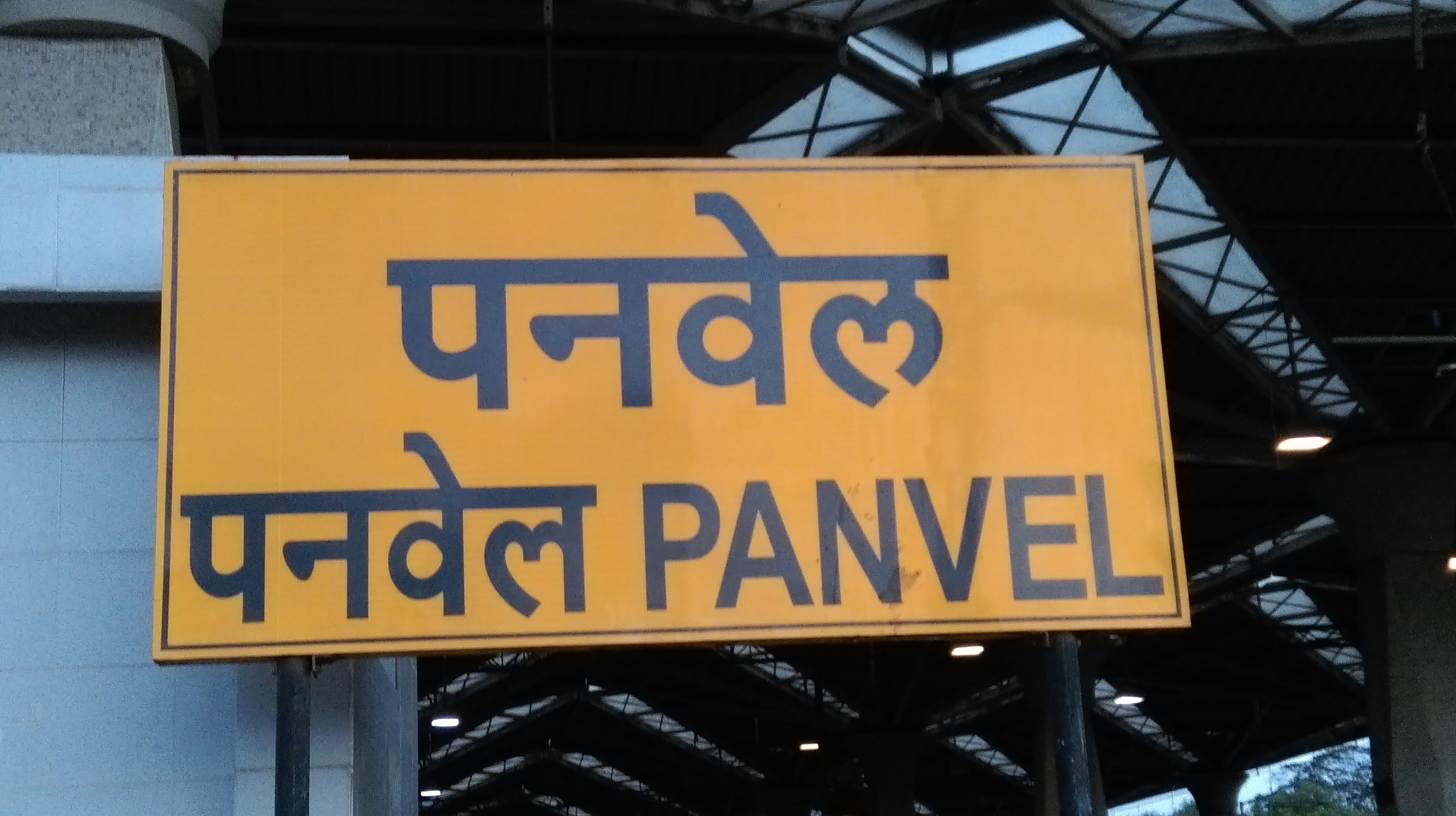
Panvel railway station – Local train station board

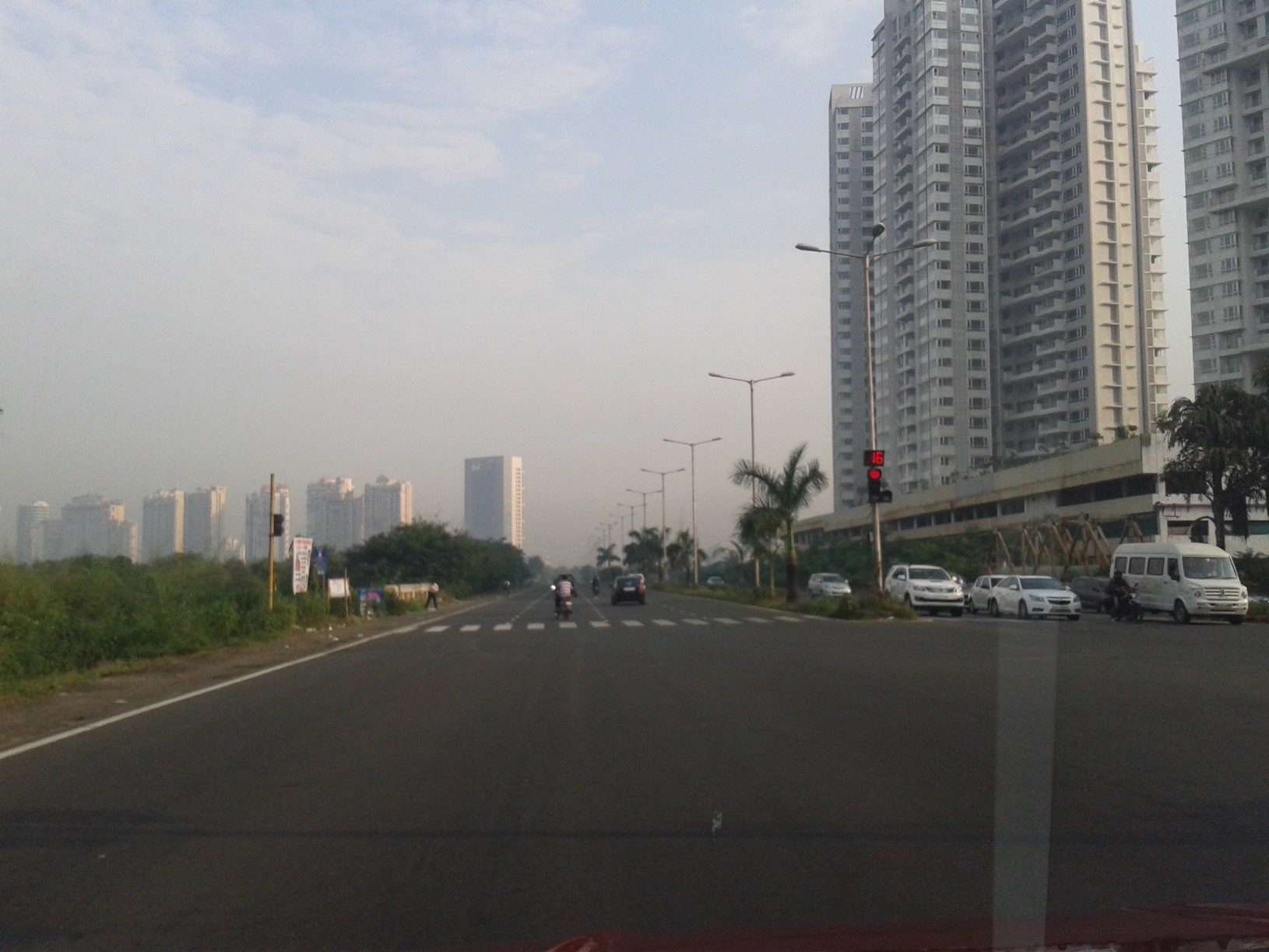
Palm Beach road, binds connectivity points from CSMT to Panvel

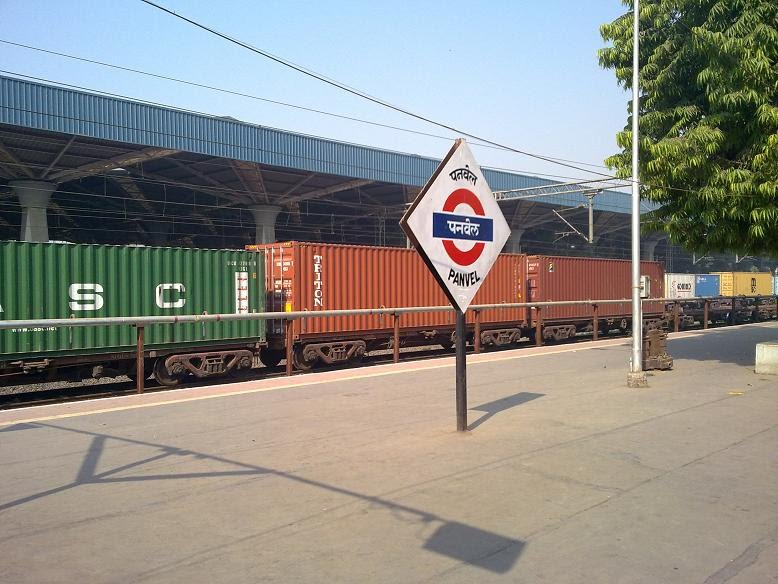
Cargo trains from Panvel to Karjat

== Services ==
Preceding station	Mumbai Suburban Railway	Following station
Mansarovar towards Chhatrapati Shivaji Terminus	Harbour line	Terminus
Khandeshwar towards Thane	Trans-Harbour line	Terminus
Chikhale towards Thane	Trans-Harbour line	Terminus
