= Panvel-Karjat Railway Corridor =

Overview
- Status: Under construction
- Owner: Indian Railways
- Locale: Maharashtra, India
- Termini: Panvel railway station; Karjat railway station
- Stations: 5

Service
- Type: Suburban rail
- System: Mumbai Suburban Railway
- Services: 1
- Operator: Central Railway

Technical
- Line length: 29.6 km
- Number of tracks: 2
- Character: Elevated, Surface, Tunnel
- Track gauge: 5 ft 6 in (1,676 mm) broad gauge
- Electrification: 25 kV AC railway electrification
- Operating speed: 80 km/h (proposed)

The Panvel-Karjat Railway Corridor is a suburban railway infrastructure project under the Mumbai Urban Transport Project (MUTP-III). It was designed to enhance railway connectivity between Panvel and Karjat in the Mumbai Metropolitan Region (MMR). The 29.6 km corridor is currently being developed by the Mumbai Rail Vikas Corporation (MRVC) and is expected to reduce travel time while easing congestion on existing railway routes. The project is part of an effort to expand the Mumbai Suburban Railway network and improve commuter transport between Mumbai and its extended suburbs.

== Route and stations ==
The corridor spans 29.6 kilometres (18.4 mi), connecting Panvel to Karjat and includes five stations:Panvel, Chikhale, Poyanje, Chouk and, Karjat.

== Infrastructure ==
The project includes several key infrastructural components. It includes three tunnels with a total length of 3,100 meters, the longest being the Wavarle Tunnel, which spans 2.6 km. A total of 44 bridges are planned, with all 44 completed as of June 2026, including nine major and 35 minor bridges. Additionally, four Road Over Bridges (ROBs) have been constructed at key locations such as Mohope and Kiraoli. The Pune Expressway Underpass is also near completion, with final touches underway.

== Project progress ==
As of October 2024, the project had reached 67% completion, with key milestones achieved. Land acquisition has been completed, securing 56.82 hectares of private land and 4.4 hectares of government land. Forest clearance for Stage I has been obtained, with Stage II clearance in advanced stages. Earthwork has progressed significantly, with over 2 million cubic meters of filling completed. The excavation of all three tunnels has been fully completed, with lining works underway.

== Impact and benefits ==
Once completed, the Panvel-Karjat corridor is expected to significantly reduce travel time between Chhatrapati Shivaji Maharaj Terminus (CSMT) and Karjat, cutting the journey duration by approximately 30 minutes compared to the existing route via Kalyan. The improved connectivity had been expected to provide a direct suburban rail link between Mumbai and Karjat via Panvel, helping alleviate congestion and streamline passenger movement. The project is also expected to boost economic growth by fostering urban development, increasing property values, and attracting new investments in the surrounding areas.

== Future outlook ==
The railway corridor is expected to be fully operational by October 2026, integrating into Mumbai's rapidly expanding suburban railway network. Upon completion, it is anticipated to enhance regional transport efficiency and serve as a critical link for daily commuters in the Mumbai Metropolitan Region.

== See also ==
- Mumbai Suburban Railway
- Mumbai Urban Transport Project
- Central Railway (India)
- Mumbai Metropolitan Region Development Authority
