= Chikhale railway station =

Railway Station in Maharashtra, India

Chikhale चिखले

General information
- Coordinates: 18.9738°N 73.1523°E
- Owner: Indian Railways
- Line: Panvel-Karjat Railway Corridor
- Platforms: 2
- Tracks: 2

Construction
- Structure type: On Ground
- Platform levels: 1m

Other information
- Status: Active
- Station code: CKHS
- Fare zone: Central Railway zone
Route map
Location
- Location within Maharashtra

Chikhale railway station is a station on the Panvel-Karjat Railway Corridor in Maharashtra, India. The preceding station on the line is Poyanje railway station and the next station is Panvel railway station.
