= Karjat railway station =

Railway Station in Maharashtra, India

Karjat
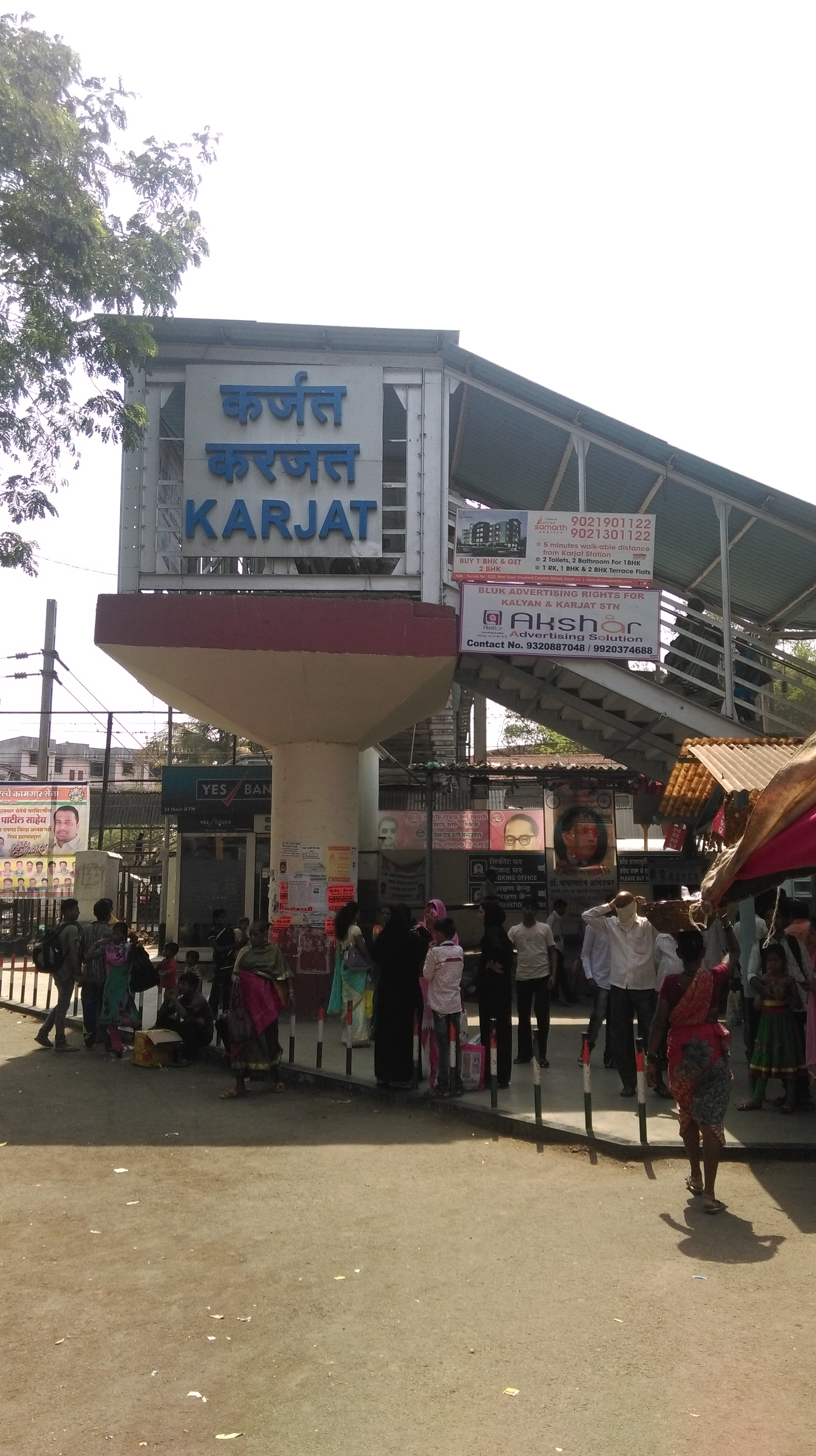

General information
- Location: Karjat, Raigad district
- Coordinates: 18.911529°N 73.320903°E
- Elevation: 51.75 metres (169.8 ft)
- System: Indian Railways and Mumbai Suburban Railway station
- Owner: Ministry of Railways, Indian Railways
- Lines: Central Line; Panvel-Karjat Railway Corridor
- Platforms: 4

Other information
- Status: Active
- Station code: KJT (Central Railways); S (Mumbai Suburban Railway)
- Fare zone: Central Railways

History
- Opened: 1 April 1863

Services
Preceding station	Mumbai Suburban Railway	Following station
Bhivpuri Road towards Chhatrapati Shivaji Terminus	Central line	Palasdhari towards Khopoli
Route map
Location
- Location within India Location within Maharashtra

Karjat (station code: KJT on Central Railways and S for South on Mumbai Suburban Railway) is a railway station on the Central line of the Mumbai Suburban Railway network. Karjat is a major rail terminus, connected via local trains to Chhatrapati Shivaji Maharaj Terminus Mumbai, Khopoli and Panvel.

== Gallery ==
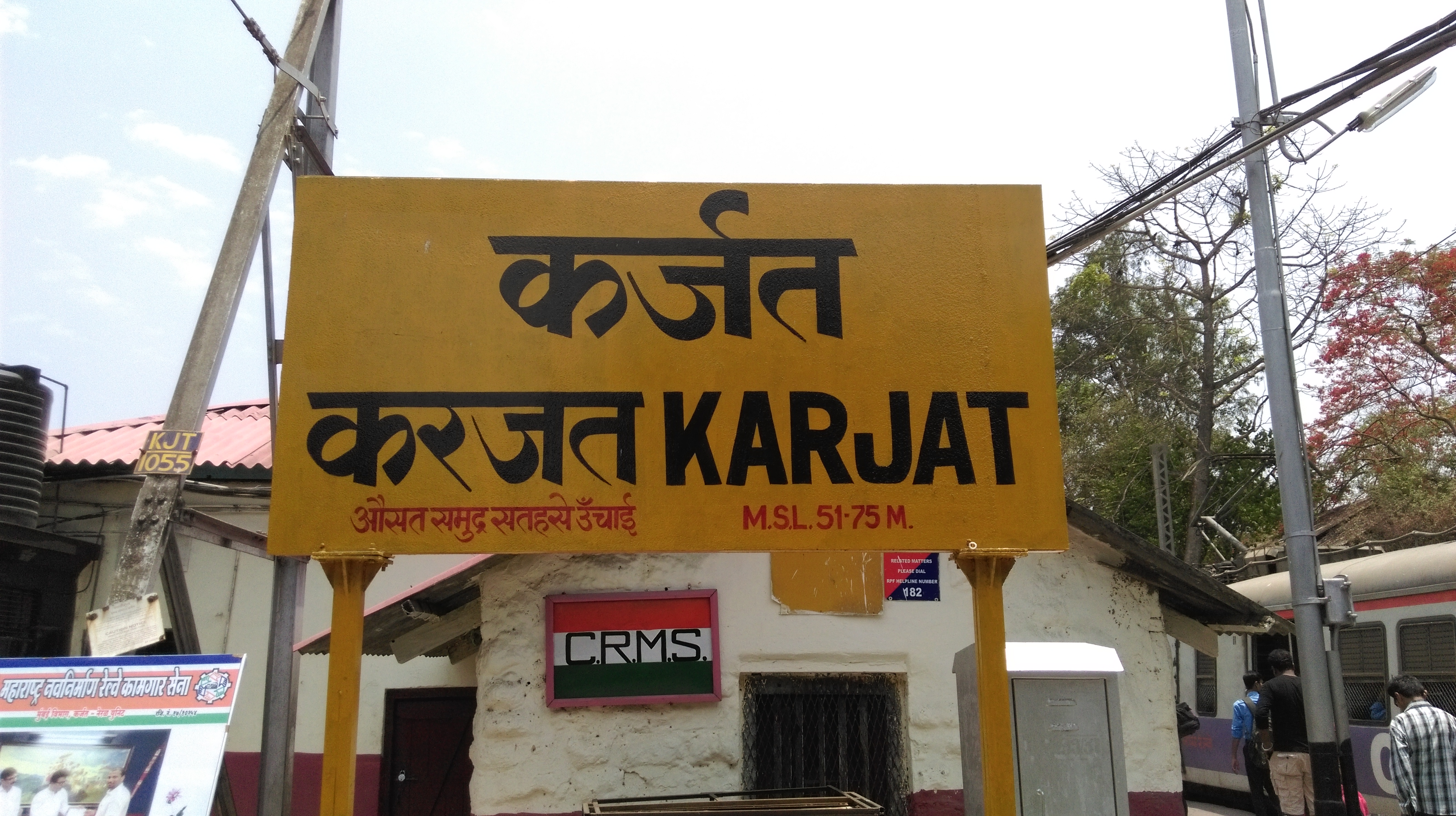
Karjat railway station – Station board

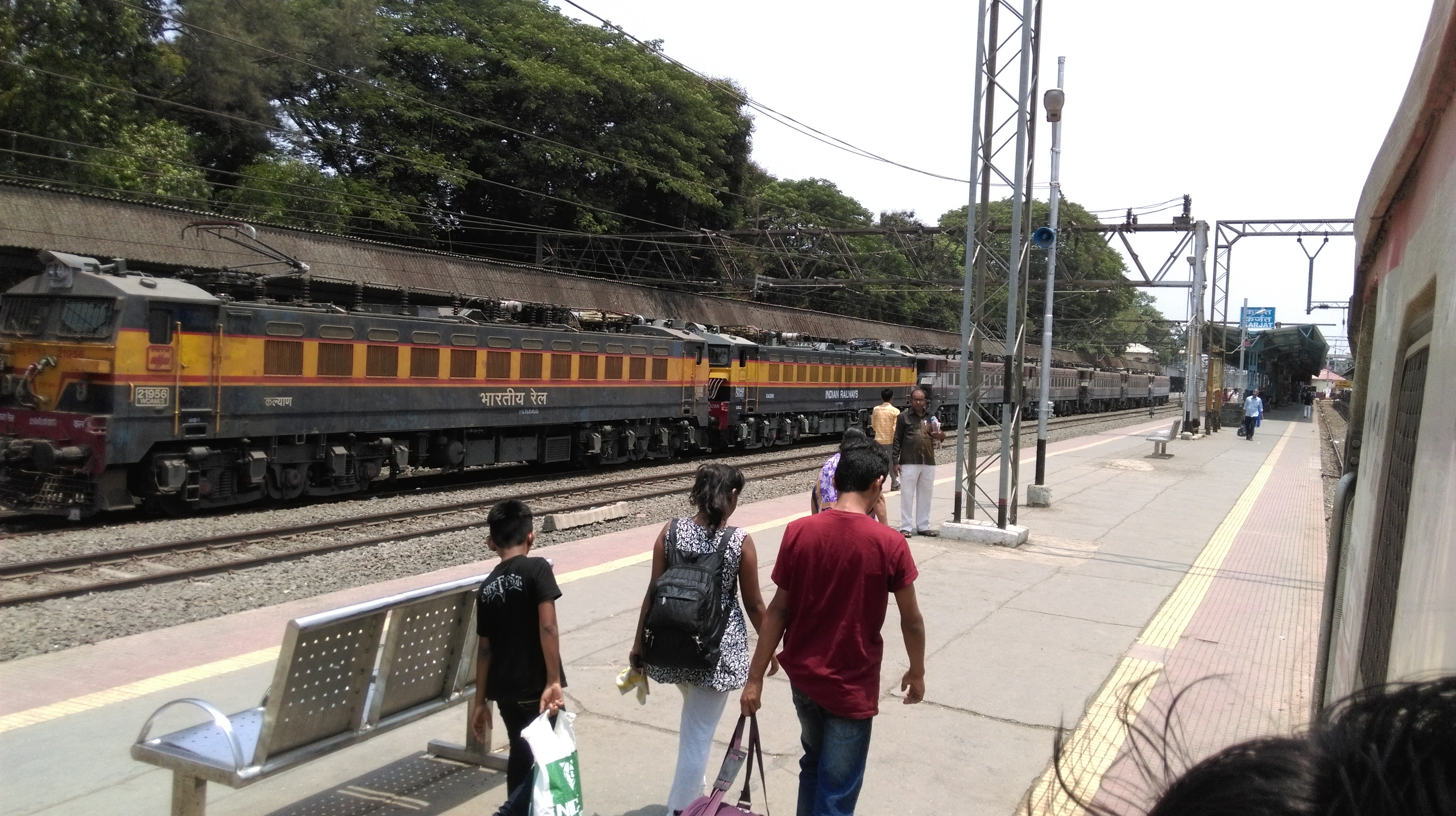
Karjat railway station – WCAM-3 bankers at Karjat

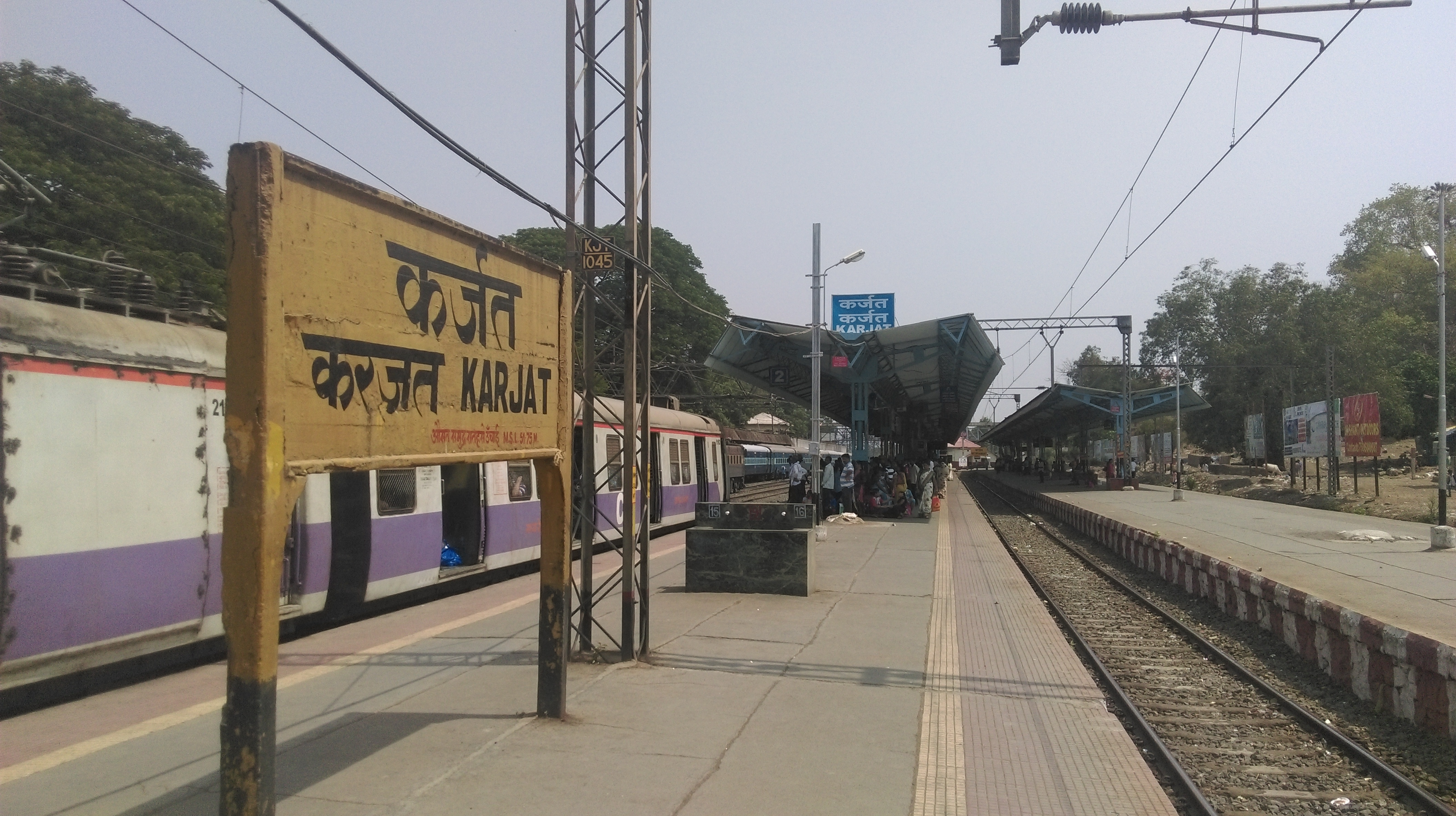
Karjat railway station – dead end platform 3

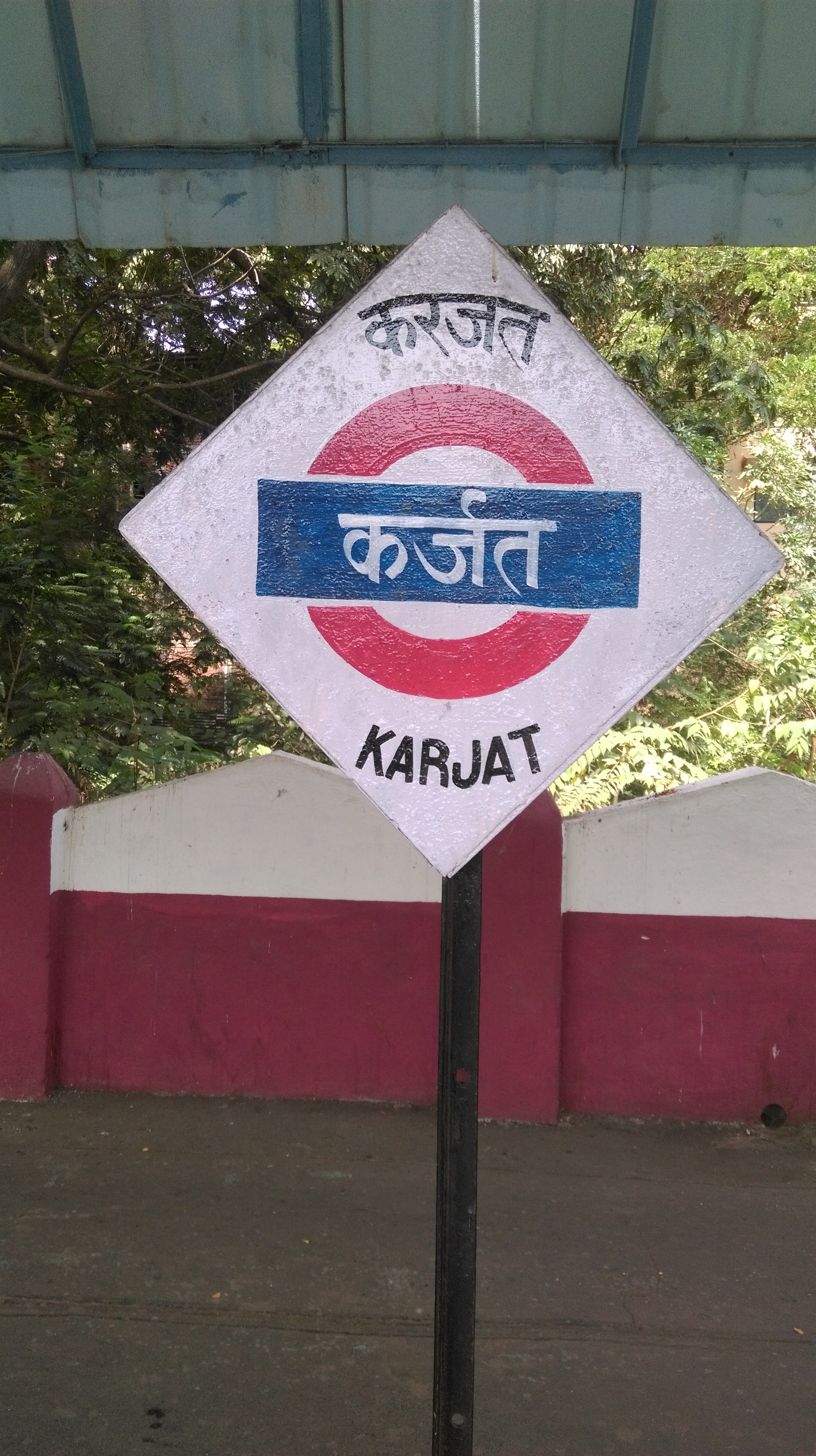
Karjat railway station – platform board
