= Poyanje railway station =

Railway Station in Maharashtra, India

Poyanje पोयंजे

General information
- Owner: Indian Railways
- Line: Panvel-Karjat Railway Corridor
- Platforms: 2
- Tracks: 2

Construction
- Structure type: On Ground
- Platform levels: 1m

Other information
- Status: Active
- Station code: PYJE
- Fare zone: Central Railway zone

History
- Former names: Mohope
Route map
Location
- Location within Maharashtra

Poyanje railway station, formerly Mohope railway station, is a station on Panvel-Karjat Railway Corridor. The preceding station on the line is Chouk railway station and the next station is Chikhale railway station.
