= Chikhale, Dahanu =

Village in Maharashtra, India

Chikhale
- village
- Location in Maharashtra, India Chikhale (India)
- Coordinates: 19.6031925°N 73.128322°E
- Country: India
- State: Maharashtra
- District: Palghar
- Taluka: Dahanu
- Elevation: 44 m (144 ft)

Population (2011)
  - Total: 4,534
- Time zone: UTC+5:30 (IST)
- 2011 census code: 551585

Chikhale is a village in the Palghar district of Maharashtra, India. It is located in the Dahanu taluka.

== Demographics ==
According to the 2011 census of India, Chikhale has 1120 households. The effective literacy rate (i.e. the literacy rate of population excluding children aged 6 and below) is 76%.

Demographics (2011 Census)
	Total	Male	Female
Population	4534	2227	2307
Children aged below 6 years	522	268	254
Scheduled caste	174	77	97
Scheduled tribe	2112	1007	1105
Literates	3049	1669	1380
Workers (all)	1790	1281	509
Main workers (total)	1434	1094	340
Main workers: Cultivators	52	41	11
Main workers: Agricultural labourers	507	327	180
Main workers: Household industry workers	30	12	18
Main workers: Other	845	714	131
Marginal workers (total)	356	187	169
Marginal workers: Cultivators	14	11	3
Marginal workers: Agricultural labourers	232	106	126
Marginal workers: Household industry workers	6	4	2
Marginal workers: Others	104	66	38
Non-workers	2744	946	1798
