= Mumbai Suburban Railway =

Set of railway lines in India

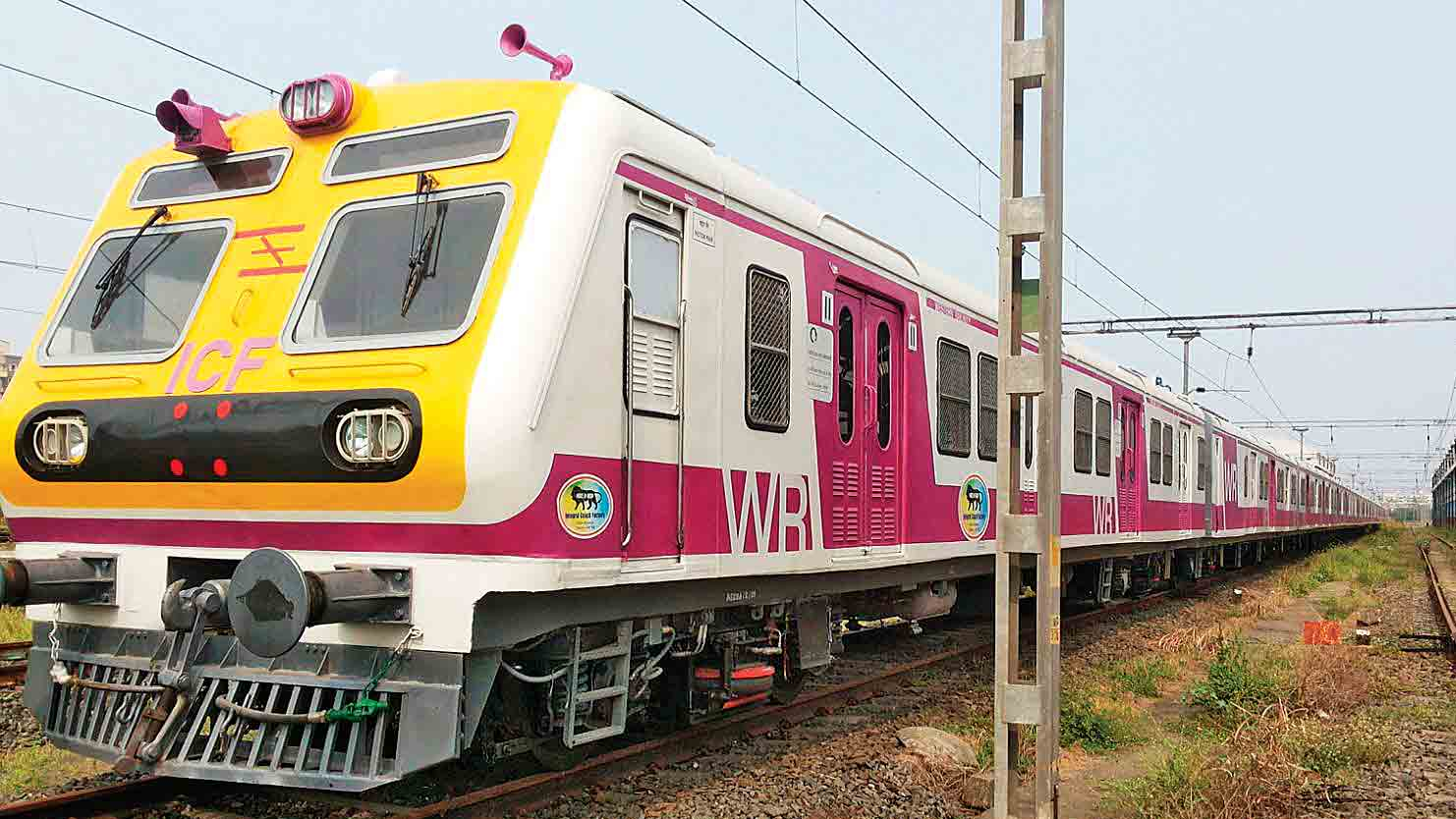
- A Medha EMU, with the same design as the Bombardier rakes.

Overview
- Owner: Indian Railways
- Locale: Mumbai Metropolitan Region
- Transit type: Suburban Rail
- Number of lines: 7
- Number of stations: 150: Western: 37; Central: 51; Harbour: 35; Trans-Harbour: 11; Port: 11; Vasai–Roha: 23; Neral–Matheran: 5; Panvel–Karjat: 5
- Daily ridership: 61.95 lakh/6.195 million (2022–23)
- Annual ridership: 2.261 billion
- Headquarters: Chhatrapati Shivaji Maharaj Terminus (CR); Churchgate (WR)
- Website: Central Railway; Western Railway

Operation
- Began operation: 16 April 1853; 173 years ago
- Operators: Western Railway zone: Western line; Central Railway zone: Central line; Harbour line; Trans-Harbour line; Port line; Vasai Road–Roha line; Neral–Matheran line; Panvel–Karjat line
- Train length: 12 or 15 coaches

Technical
- System length: 450.9 kilometres (280.2 mi) only existing lines running to rapid transit/suburban standards (Western, Central, Harbour and Port Lines). 585.9 kilometres (364.1 mi) including Vasai-Roha Line which currently has only MEMU service. 651.5 kilometres (404.8 mi) all existing and upcoming lines including new under construction greenfield lines (Panvel-Karjat and Kalyan-Murbad).
- Track gauge: 1,676 mm (5 ft 6 in)
- Electrification: 25 kV 50 Hz AC overhead catenary
- Average speed: 35 km/h (22 mph)
- Top speed: 110 km/h (68 mph)

The Mumbai Suburban Railway (colloquially called local trains or simply locals) consists of exclusive inner suburban railway lines, augmented by commuter rail on main lines serving outlying suburbs to serve the Mumbai Metropolitan Region in India. Spread over 450 kilometres (280 mi), the suburban railway operates 2,342 train services and carries more than 7.5 million commuters daily.

The daily commuters constitute around 40% of the daily commuters of Indian Railways. By annual ridership (2.64 billion), the Mumbai Suburban Railway is one of the busiest commuter rail systems in the world.

== History ==
The Mumbai Suburban Railway is the first passenger railway built by the British East India Company, and it is also the oldest railway system in Asia. The first train was run by the Great Indian Peninsula Railway (1849-1951) (now Central Railway) between Bori Bunder (demolished and rebuilt as Chhatrapati Shivaji Maharaj Terminus) and Thane, a distance of 34 km (21 mi), on 16 April 1853, at 15:35. The 14-coach train took 57 minutes to complete the 34 km journey, with a halt at Sion to refill the train's water tanks.

The next major service was initiated between Virar and Bombay Backbay by the Bombay, Baroda and Central India Railway (now Western Railway) on 12 April 1867. Colaba was also added as a station on this route in 1873, and remained the southern terminus for about 57 years, before being shut down on New Year's Eve in 1930. On 3 February 1925, the first EMU (Electrical Multiple Unit) service was initiated from Victoria Terminus (now Chhatrapati Shivaji Maharaj Terminus) to Coorla Harbour (now Kurla) on the Central line, which was run on 1.5 kV DC traction. EMU service on the Western line, between Colaba and Borivali, commenced on 5 January 1928. By 2016, the entire network had been converted to 25 kV, 50 Hz AC traction.

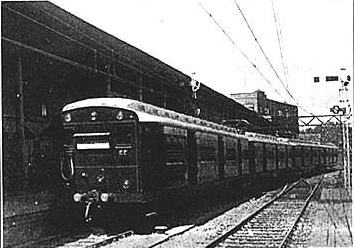
The first EMU service, launched in 1925

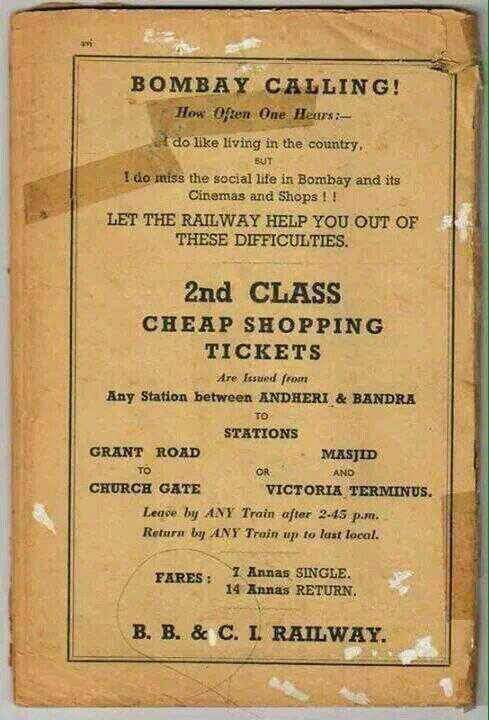
An advertisement for the Bombay, Baroda and Central India Railway (now merged into Indian railways in 1951 under the name (Western Railway)

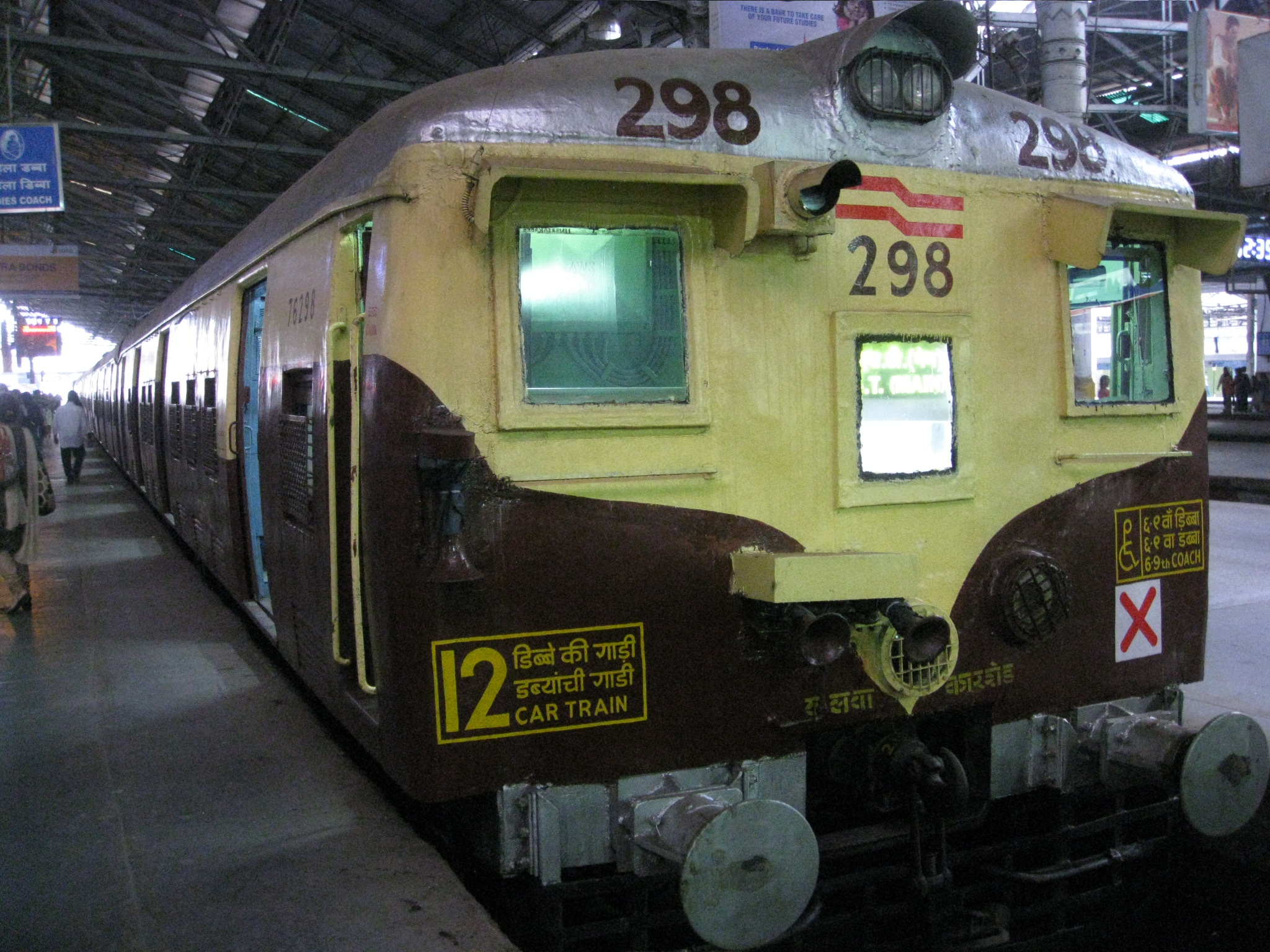
A Jessop-built 1.5 kV DC EMU train built in the 1950s. This design was nicknamed the Lovemate and was discontinued in 2016.

== Rolling stock ==
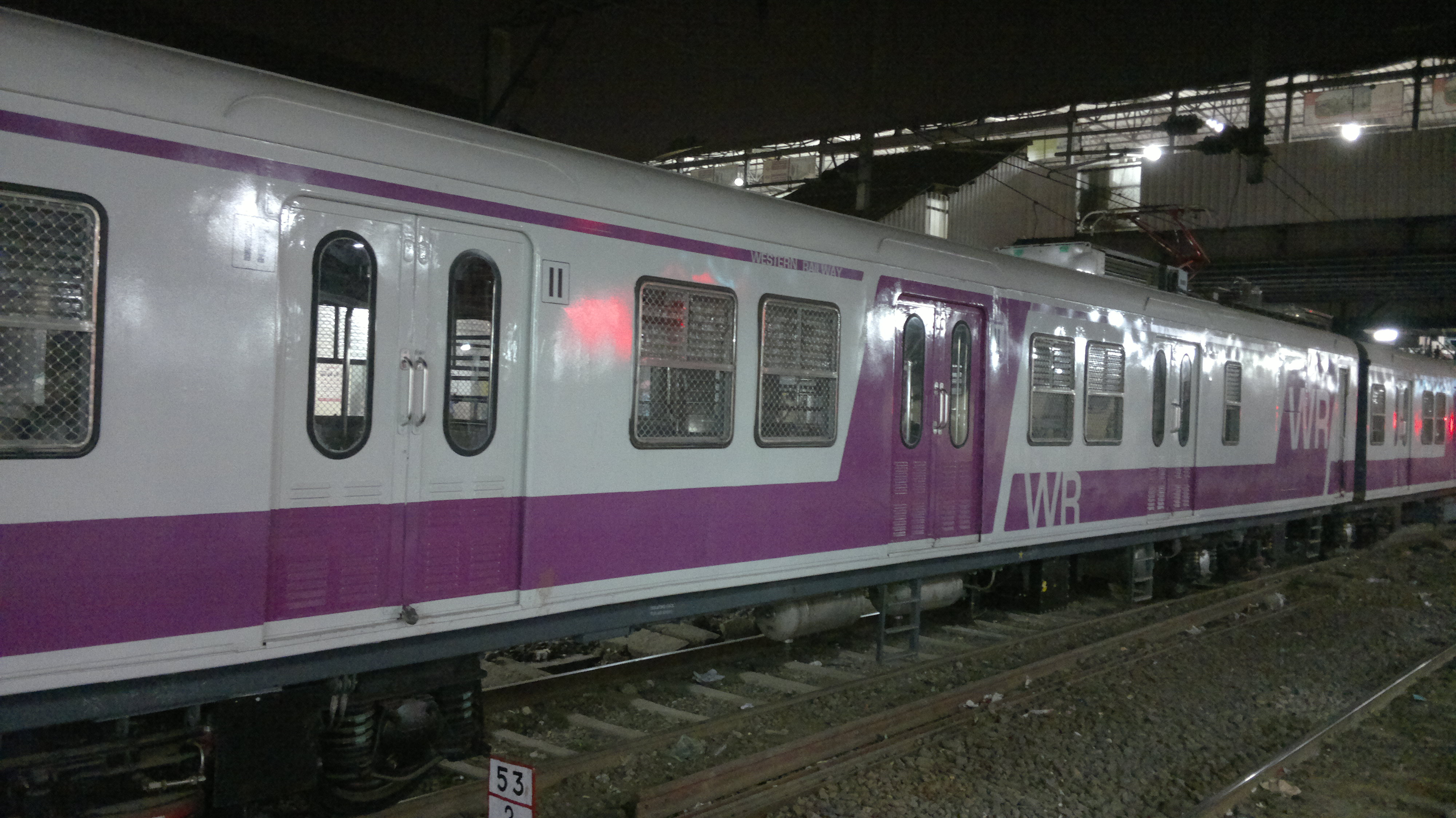
A Bombardier EMU, introduced on 18 March 2015. These rakes are more common on the Western line. Each coach has a standard capacity of 400 passengers.

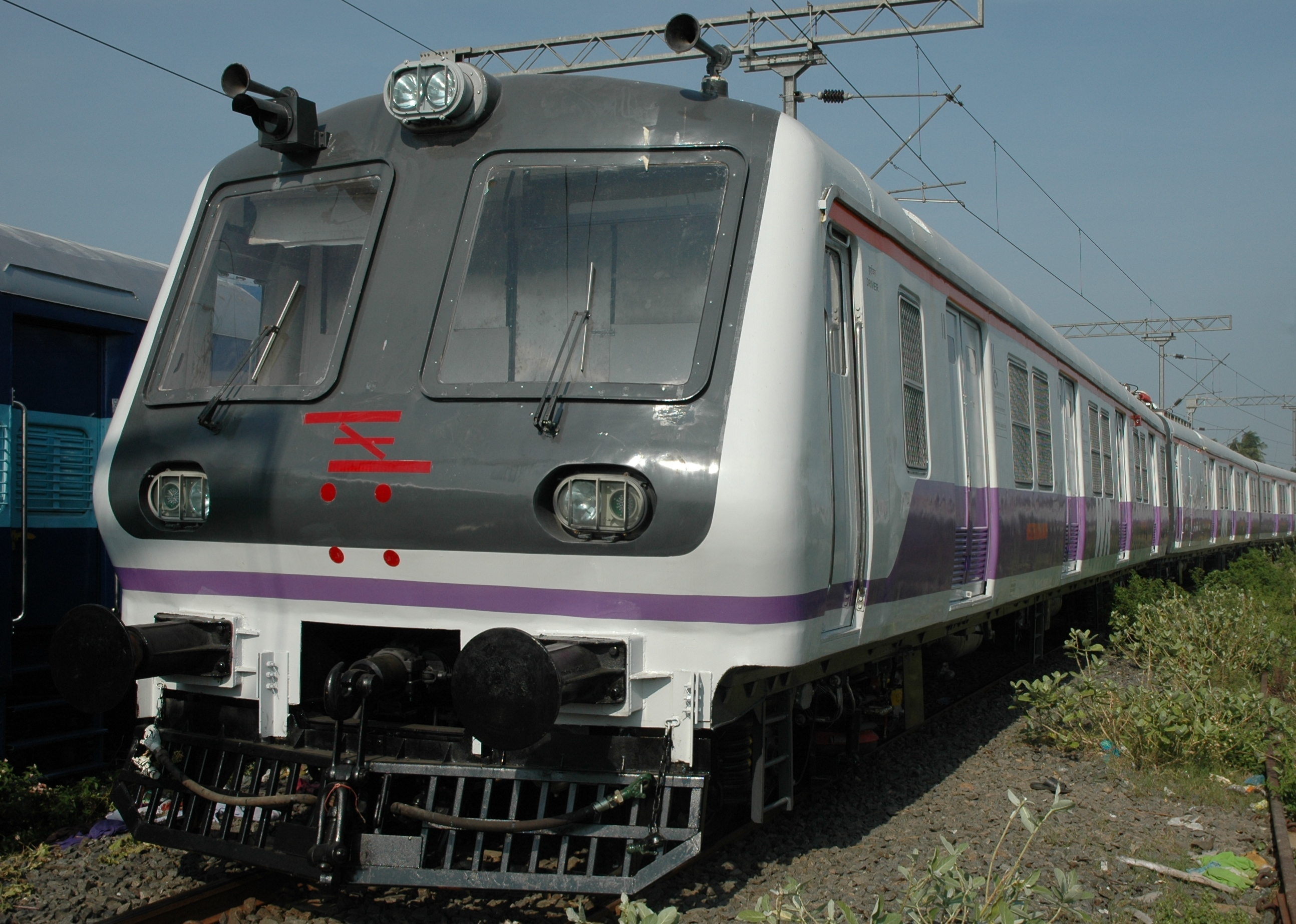
Purple and White EMU

The suburban services are run by electric multiple units (EMUs) in 191 rakes (train sets) of 12-car and 15-car composition. To alleviate the problems of overcrowding, the nine-car trains have been phased out and replaced with 12-car ones. 15-coach trains were introduced on 21 November 2009. However, these are few in number. Equipment makers include Jessop, Siemens, Bombardier Transportation, and Medha. The trains are manufactured at the Integral Coach Factory (ICF) in Chennai, Tamil Nadu. All routes are electrified at 25 kV 50 Hz AC power supply from overhead lines. The Indian Railways plans to build a 700 MW gas-based plant in Thakurli to generate electricity to operate Mumbai's railways.

=== Manufacturing ===
The current fleet of both the Western and Central Railways features a few old rakes built by BHEL and ICF (Perambur, Chennai), which are capable of a maximum speed of 85 km/h (53 mph), MRVC Siemens Rakes which are capable of 100 km/h (62 mph), ICF-built Bombardier and Medha rakes capable of running at speeds of 120 km/h (75 mph) under light traffic conditions. The actual average speed of the rakes on the slow lines is about 35 km/h (22 mph), while rakes on fast lines average about 40–50 km/h (25–31 mph) on a typical run. The old BHEL non-AC rakes are on the verge of being scrapped.

On 12 November 2007, the first of 129 new 12-coach rakes with upgraded facilities was inducted into the fleet of the Western Railways under the MUTP project. These rakes are popularly called Siemens rakes and have a 1xxx and 2xxx numbering system. The coaches are built of stainless steel, and have non-cushioned seats, emergency fluorescent lights, bigger windows with polycarbonate panes, better suspension systems, roof-mounted forced ventilation to reduce carbon dioxide levels in packed trains, and GPS based passenger information systems in all coaches. The new rakes are much cooler and airier than the old EMUs. The motors of the new rakes also make less noise than the older ones. Since 2010, the front of the EMUs has been painted yellow so that the maintenance workers on the tracks can see the train easily. These rakes have been procured under the project at a total cost of ₹ 19 billion (US$431.0 million). Siemens 5 rakes that had to be delivered as part of the first phase were sent to the city in early January 2014.

New EMUs with Bombardier Electrical procured under the World Bank-funded Mumbai Urban Transport Project-2, built at the Integral Coach Factory (ICF) in Chennai, started arriving in Mumbai by April 2014. They have a 5xxx numbering system. The first of these trains, to be run on Western Railway, was flagged off by Railway Minister Suresh Prabhu at Lokmanya Tilak Terminus, Kurla, on Central Railway on Sunday, 27 October 2013. However, a delay of two years was anticipated due to the demands of automatic sliding doors on the trains. Under the Make in India initiative, the first Indian made rake was made by Medha. They have 6xxx series numbering. 9-car trains have a capacity of 2,628 (876 seated and 1,752 standing). 12 car trains have a capacity of 3,504 (1,168 seated and 2,336 standing). In fall 2013, brand new 12 car rakes were introduced on the railway. On 6 November 2019, the 5533-5536 rake of Mumbai Suburban Railway, called Uttam rake which also manufactured by the ICF was introduced and ran on Western Line.

=== Air-conditioned rakes ===
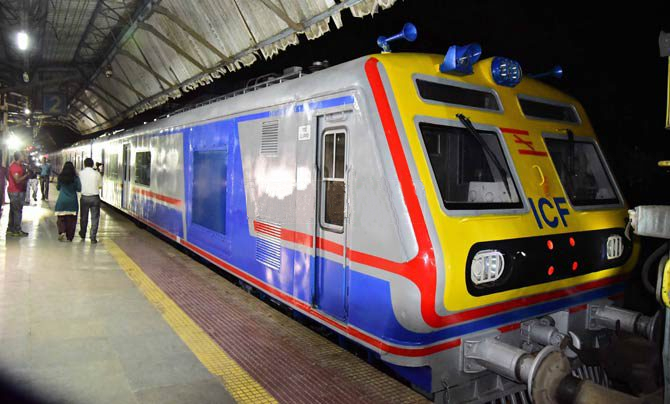
Air conditioned train in Mumbai

Discussion for AC coaches first began in 2002 and was planned to commence in 2013. However, major delays in finalising the rakes' design and procurement of materials deferred the project.

The first air-conditioned rake for use on the suburban system was built by the Integral Coach Factory in Chennai–BHEL EMU at a cost of over ₹50 crore (US$5.3 million), and arrived in Mumbai on 5 April 2016. The rake has a seating capacity of 1,028 passengers, and standing room for up to 6,000 passengers. The 12-coach rake is configured as two sets of 6 interconnected bogies, meaning passengers can walk between coaches but only up to a maximum of 6 coaches. The train is also equipped with a new electrical system and software, automatic doors with emergency opening features, and a GPS-based destination display on LED indicators. The old system of pulling a chain to halt the train was replaced by four intercoms per coach that enable commuters to communicate with the driver.

Both CR and WR competed to acquire the rake, with WR even announcing a timetable for operating the air-conditioned rake. Union Railway Minister Suresh Prabhu announced that the rake would be transferred to CR on 16 March 2016. However, at a height of 4.335 meters, the rake exceeds the maximum clearance height of 4.270 meters for EMU coaches on the Central Line. In particular, the rake cannot clear some of the low-height British-era bridges between CSMT and Kurla. Then Central Railway general manager Sunil Kumar Sood insisted that CR should conduct trials and operate the rake on the Harbour Line. After acquiring the rake, CR conducted tests, safety, and mobility checks, and trial runs under the supervision of the RDSO. However, following Sood's retirement, CR abandoned plans to operate the rake in December 2016. CR informed the Railway Board that it could not operate the rake due to the clearance issue, and the Railway Board directed them to transfer the rake to WR. The rake was transferred to WR on 12 May 2017. WR General Manager Anil Kumar Gupta stated that rake would begin commercial operations on the Western Line after WR conducted its own tests and trial runs and received regulatory approvals. Although there are some clearance issues on the Western Line as well, Gupta stated that these could be rectified.

The First AC EMU was Flagged off on 25 December 2017 in WR. The first AC local train in Mumbai began operation in December 2017 and crossed the 10 lakh passenger mark within the first five months. The summer months of March and April saw over 3 lakh passengers take the AC local each month. The train, operated by Western Railway (WR), currently plies between Churchgate and Virar. It has a seating capacity of 1,028 seats and can carry 5,964 passengers. The monthly pass on the AC local train will cost (from Churchgate) between ₹570 (US$6.10) (till Mumbai Central) to ₹820 (US$8.80) (till Bandra) to ₹1,235 (US$13) (till Andheri) to ₹1,635 (US$17) (till Borivali) to ₹1,740 (US$19) (till Bhayander) to ₹1,970 (US$21) (till Vasai Road) to ₹2,035 (US$22) (till Virar). New halts were introduced after commuters demand at Marine Lines, Charni Road, Grant Road, Dahisar, Mira Road, Naigaon, Nallasopara. Data shows that among all stations between Churchgate and Virar. Borivali was the highest earner for the AC train. The monthly earnings of the AC train are approximately ₹7,100,000 (US$76,000) per month after adding seven new halts. Two more AC local rakes were introduced, and now, the services run all days of the week.

The fourth air-conditioned rake on Mumbai Suburban Rail Network & first for Central Railway has been commissioned on Trans-harbour line from Thane to Panvel / Vashi from 30 January 2020. The fifth air-conditioned rake on Mumbai Suburban Rail Network & first for Central Railway Main Line was commissioned between Mumbai Chhatrapati Shivaji Maharaj Terminus and Kalyan on 17 December 2020. After a gap of 3 years, the first 12-coach fully-vestibuled AC Local Train made by Medha was commissioned on Western Railway on 19 December 2022. This has an 8xxx series numbering. Under the MUTP-III and MUTP-IIIA projects, Western Railway has decided to procure more AC local trains and convert the entire fleet into AC, akin to Kolkata Metro. In 2023, a new Medha rake with 71xx series numbering was introduced in Western Railway. All BHEL-made AC Local Trains in both networks have 70xx series numbering.

== Network ==
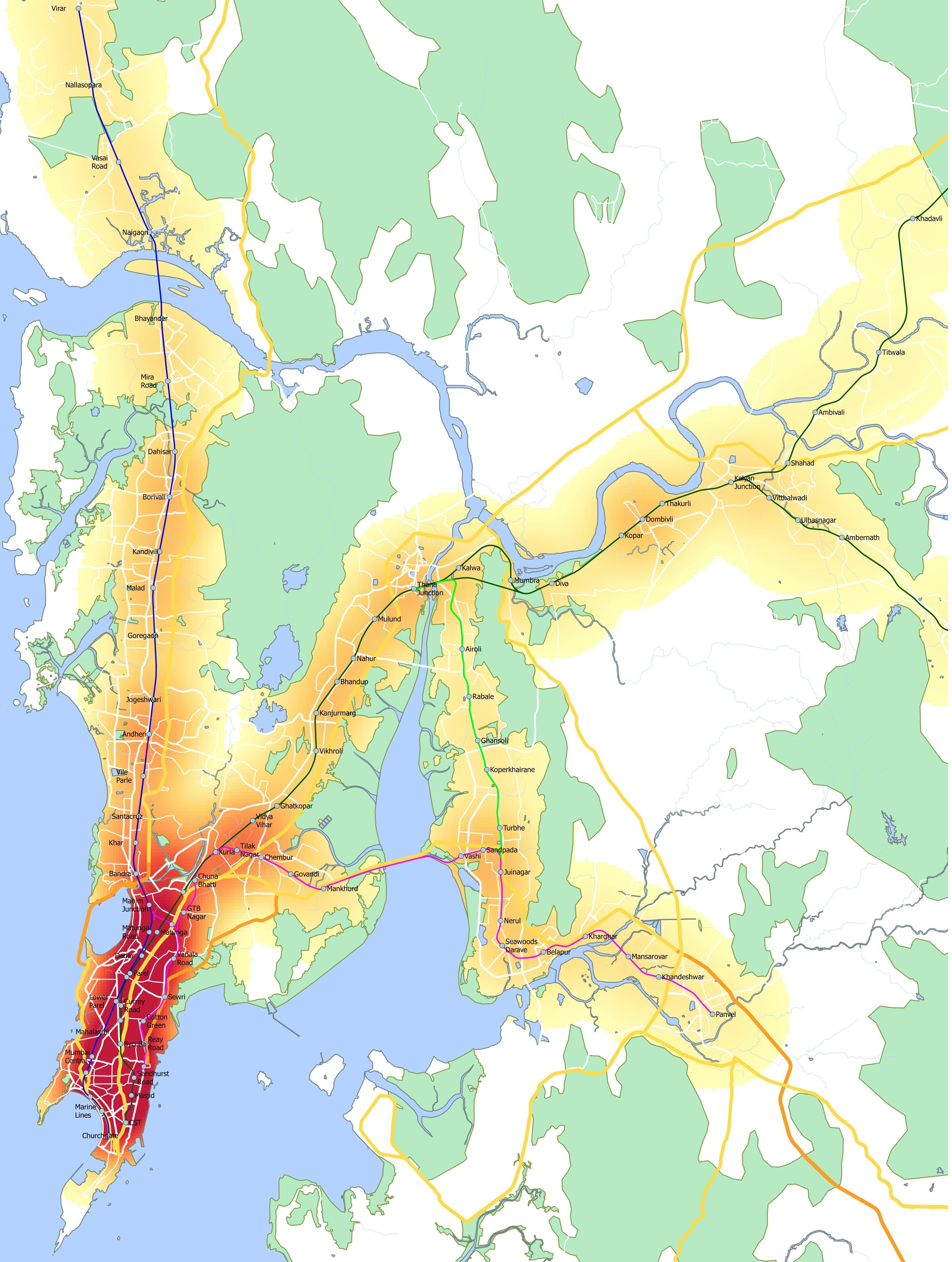
Heatmap of Mumbai Local Train & Station Density, taking into account the proximity of stations and the frequency of trains. Density scale: Dark red (highest) to light yellow (lowest). South Mumbai has the highest density (dark red) as it is serviced by 3 railway lines (Western, Central & Harbour) in a narrow land area. Away from South Mumbai, one can see densities decreasing to yellow-orange – the neighbourhoods within the city limits and those beyond it are serviced by only one railway line. Frequency reduces drastically in remote suburbs beyond Kalyan (light yellow zone).

The Mumbai Suburban Railway system is operated by Indian Railways two zonal divisions Western Railways (WR) and Central Railways (CR). The fast commuter rail corridors on Central Railway as well as Western Railway are shared with long-distance and freight trains, while inner suburban services operate on exclusive parallel tracks. WR operates the Western Line, and CR operates the Central Line, Harbour Line, Trans-Harbour Line, Vasai Road–Roha Line, Neral–Matheran Line and Panvel–Karjat line.

=== Central Line ===
The Central Line of Mumbai Suburban railway is operated by the Central Railway of India, which is the 8th zone of Indian Railways.

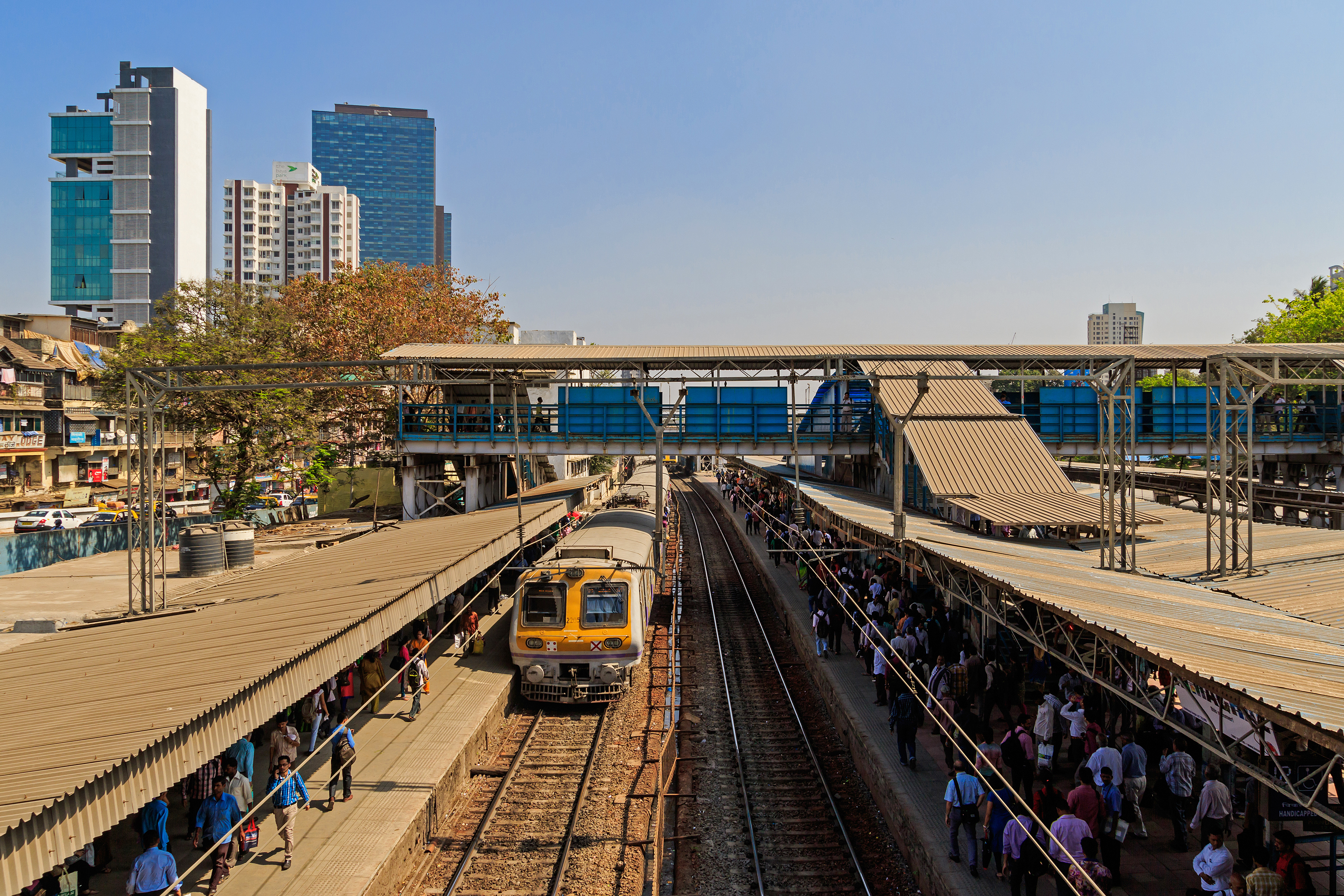
A train at Dadar

The Central Line in Mumbai consists of three major corridors, which bifurcate as they run into suburban satellite towns. Two corridors (one local and the other through) of the Central Railway run from Chhatrapati Shivaji Maharaj Terminus (CSMT) to Kalyan Junction (53 km (33 mi)), where it bifurcates into two lines – one to Kasara (67 km (42 mi)) in the north-east and the other to Khopoli (61 km (38 mi)) in the south-east. These two corridors constitute the 'Main' Central Line. There is also a 36 km (22 mi) corridor between Kurla and Kalyan Junction stations for exclusive use by outstation and cargo trains.

The Central Line has two interchange stations with the Western Line, at Parel and Dadar and the Harbour Line at Sandhurst Road and Kurla. Rolling stock consists of a fleet of AC and alternating current new Bombardier and Siemens EMUs. The major car sheds on this line are at Kurla and Kalwa. There are both fast and slow locals. Slow locals halt at every station, while fast locals' halts vary between Byculla, Dadar, Kurla, Ghatkopar, Vikhroli, Bhandup, Mulund, Thane, Diva Junction, Dombivli and Kalyan Junction. All trains travelling beyond Kalyan run as slow trains and stop at every station.

=== Western Line ===
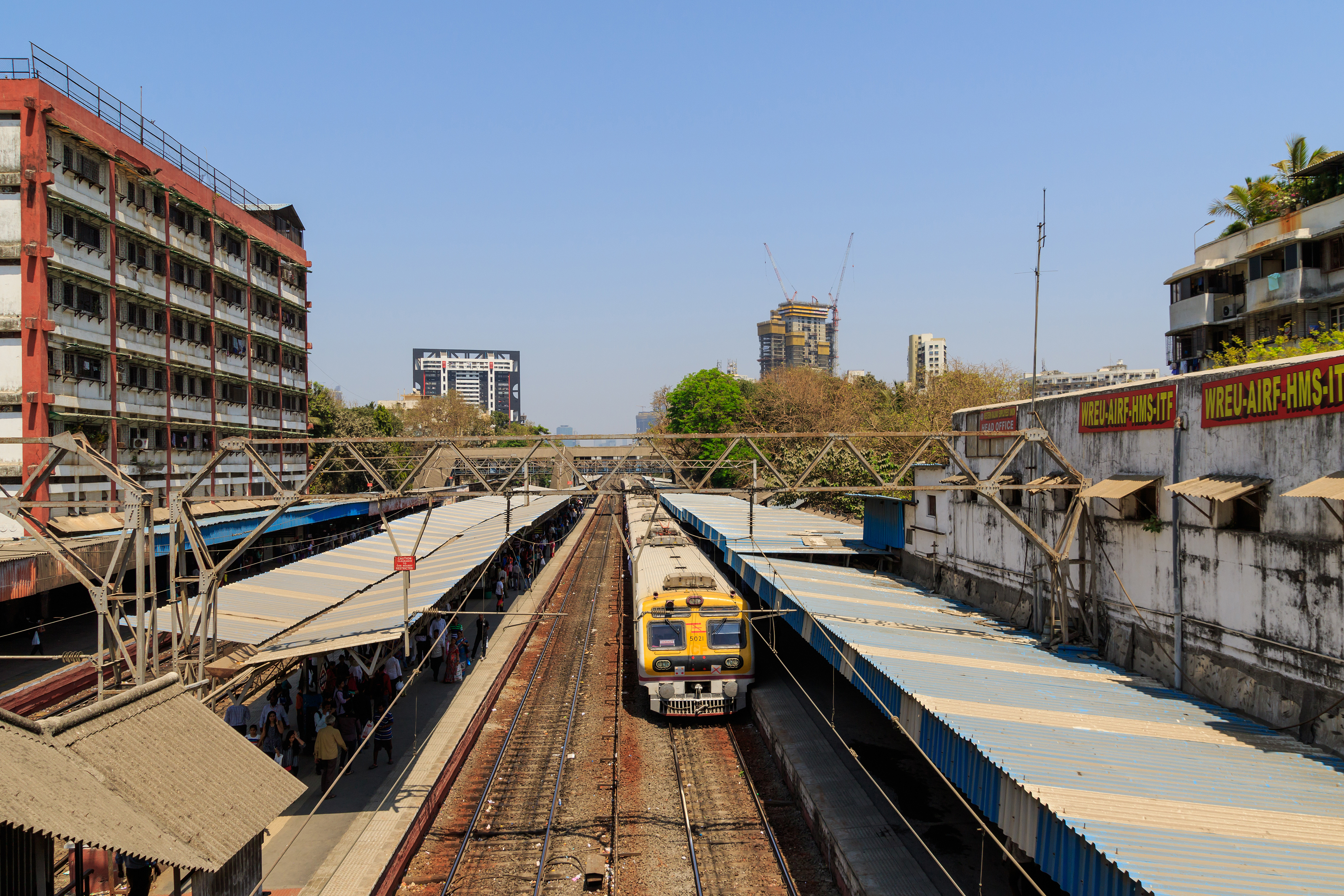
A train at Grant Road

The Western Line follows the Western Railway northwards from Churchgate parallel to the west coast. Local services by electric multiple units (EMUs) ply between Churchgate and Dahanu Road (124 km (77 mi)) on exclusive parallel tracks up to Virar (60 km (37 mi)) while MEMUs service the section beyond Virar to Dahanu Road (64 km (40 mi)). On 16 April 2013, EMU has been extended up to Dahanu Road. MEMUs also operate between Dahanu Road and Panvel via a branch line from Diva Junction–Vasai Road. There are EMU car sheds at Mumbai Central, Kandivli and Virar. The largest EMU car shed in Asia is located at Virar. A repair shop for EMUs is situated at Mahalaxmi.

Western Railway's EMU fleet consists of EMUs completely powered by alternating current (25 kV) power. Rolling stock consists of a fleet of new Bombardier AC and alternating current EMUs. EMUs are 12-car or 15-car formations and are differentiated as slow and fast locals. Slow trains halt at all stations, while fast ones halt at Mumbai Central, Dadar, Bandra, Andheri, Borivali, Bhayandar, Vasai Road and Virar stations which are preferable over longer distances.

=== Harbour Line ===
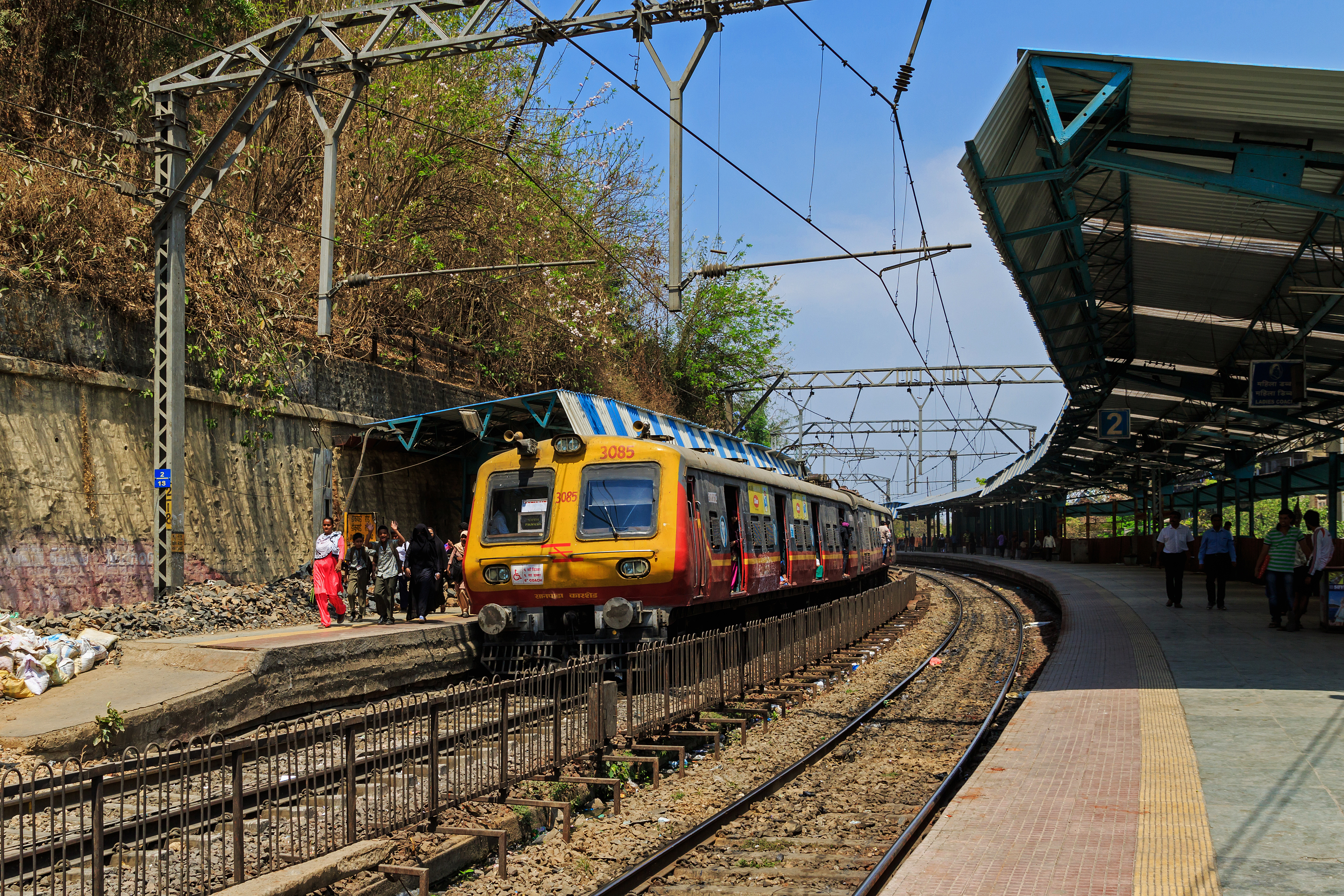
A train at Dockyard Road

The Harbour Line is part of the Central Railway main zone, and runs from Chhatrapati Shivaji Maharaj Terminus (CSMT) to Goregaon and Panvel. All Harbour Line services operate as slow services. The line operates from two separate platforms at CSMT, and the tracks cross over the mainline at Sandhurst Road to head towards stations along Mumbai's Eastern dock area. A branch line from Wadala Road joins the Western Line at Mahim Junction and continues towards Goregaon. Further construction is ongoing to extend the Western Line branch to Borivali, which is going to be completed in March 2028 for phase one which is CSMT to Malad, and phase 2 Malad to Borivali to be completed in December 2028

The Harbour Line has an interchange station with the mainline at Kurla, where it turns east towards Navi Mumbai. The Harbour Line further bifurcates at Vashi into two lines – one rejoins the main lines at Thane, while the other continues to Panvel. The shed for these trains is in Sanpada. A partial section of the Harbour Line is elevated from Sandhurst Road to Cotton Green.

=== Trans-Harbour Line ===
The Trans-Harbour Line, which is another part of the Central Railway, connects Navi Mumbai and Thane. It operates from two separate platforms at Thane to Nerul, where it joins the Harbour line till Panvel and a small branch line from Turbhe goes to Vashi as it runs parallel with the Harbour line. All services on the trans-harbour line are all-stop services. Freight trains share the tracks through a bypass from Airoli to Kopar Khairane, after which it goes to a siding in Turbhe for the APMC market godowns.

=== Vasai Road–Roha Line ===
The Vasai Road–Roha line is an Intersection chord rail bypass line of the Mumbai Suburban Railway, which connects the Western line, Central line and Harbour line of the Western Railway zone and Central Railway zone. It runs from Vasai Road to Roha which also connects Panvel and the Konkan Railway. Currently this line is used for bypassing freight trains, Express and MEMU Passenger trains. And also construction of a separate Suburban Corridor on this route for more connectivity by the MRVC is going.

=== Port Line ===
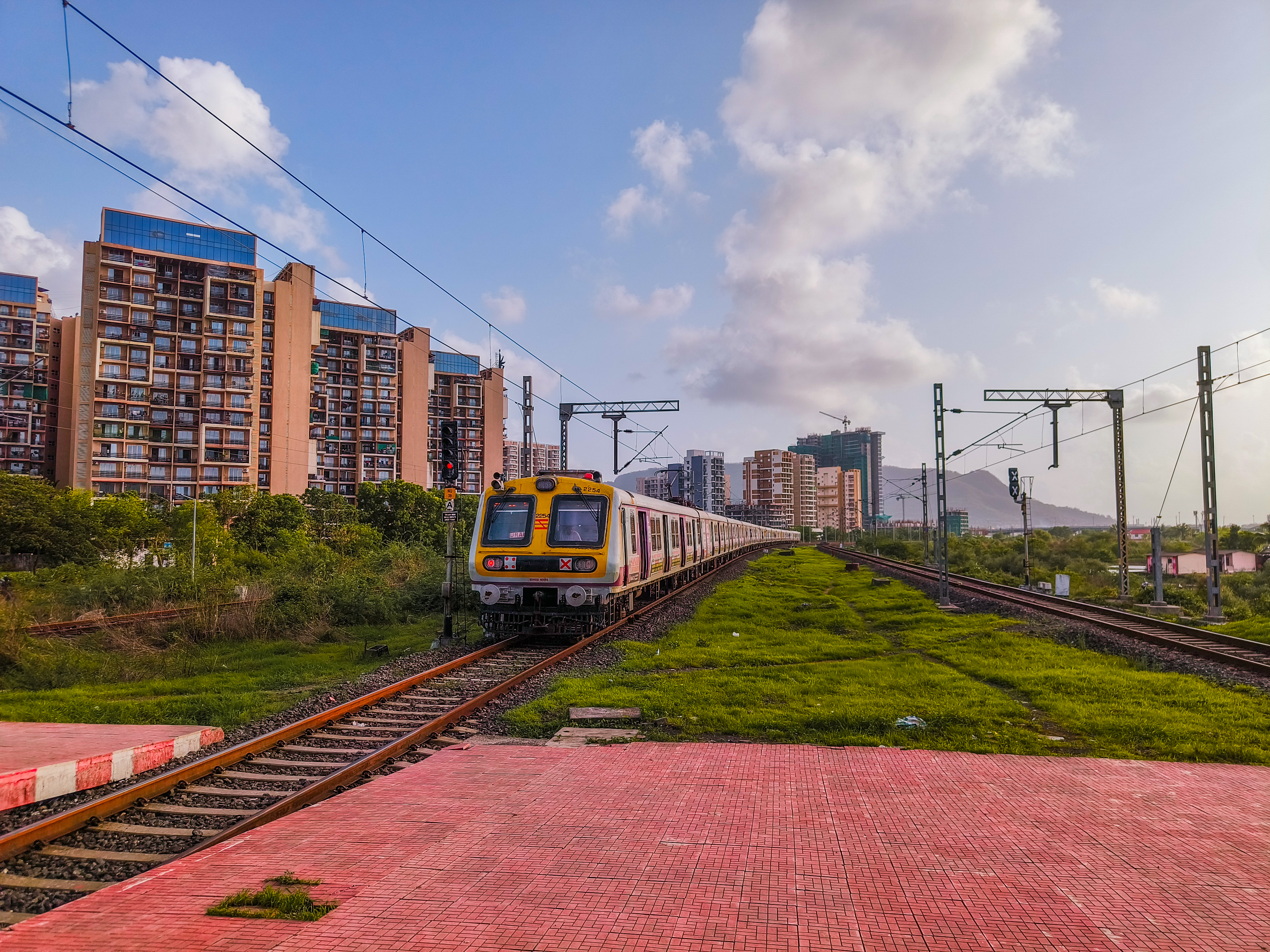
A train at Dronagiri

The Port line, also known as the Nerul–Uran line, is another part of the Central Railway that connects Navi Mumbai to Uran, which is located on southwestern peninsula. It also operates from the two separate platforms of Nerul and one separate platform of CBD Belapur to Uran, also making connectivity to JNPT in Navi Mumbai directly.

=== Panvel–Karjat Line ===
The Panvel-Karjat Railway Corridor is an upcoming 29.6 km suburban line aimed at enhancing connectivity within the Mumbai Metropolitan Region. This corridor will include five stations: Panvel, Chikhale, Mohope, Chowk, and Karjat. As of June 2026, the project has achieved 85% completion, with full operations expected by post monsoon trial runs (October-December)

== Defunct stations and terminals ==
Several railway stations and dedicated mainline terminals across Mumbai's network have been decommissioned, demolished, or altered due to track realignments, land reclamation, and network modernization.

Station name	Line/network	Year closed	Modern location	Historical significance & reason for closure
Churchgate (Long-Distance Terminus)	Western Line (Bombay, Baroda & Central India Railway)	1930	Churchgate, South Mumbai	Originally featured a dedicated platform for long-distance steam outstation trains running to Gujarat and Ahmedabad. Long-distance services were completely made defunct here and shifted to Mumbai Central railway station in 1930 when tracks further south were dismantled.
Colaba	Western Line (Bombay, Baroda & Central India Railway)	1930	Near modern-day Badhwar Park, Colaba	Served as the ultimate southernmost terminus of the Western line network. Closed and completely demolished to facilitate the Backbay Reclamation scheme (modern Nariman Point).
Ballard Pier Mole	Central Line (Great Indian Peninsula Railway)	1944	Ballard Pier, South Mumbai	A grand premier station operating inside the Mumbai Port Trust limits. It allowed ocean liner passengers arriving from Europe to seamlessly transfer onto elite long-distance trains like the Frontier Mail. Dismantled post-WWII as maritime-rail traffic shifted.
Mahul Road	Salsette–Trombay Railway	1934	Mahul Village, near Kurla	Part of an early 13-kilometre tramway/railway line built by the Bombay Improvement Trust to develop suburban areas; entirely dismantled by 1934.
Trombay	Salsette–Trombay Railway	1934	Trombay, North-East Mumbai	Served as the easternmost terminal station of the Salsette–Trombay rail line before the corridor was permanently closed.
Chakala	Salsette–Trombay Railway	1934	Andheri-Kurla Road, Andheri	An intermediate station on the defunct Salsette network. The tracks were completely uprooted, and the modern-day Andheri-Kurla link road closely overlays this old right-of-way footprint.
Bellasis Road	Western Line (Bombay, Baroda & Central India Railway)	1930	Mumbai Central Area	A standard intermediate station that was entirely absorbed, expanded, and replaced during the engineering phase to construct the larger Mumbai Central railway station complex.
Bori Bunder	Central Line (Great Indian Peninsula Railway)	1888	Mumbai CSMT Site	The historic, wooden-shed starting station for India's historic first-ever passenger train run to Thane in 1853. It was completely demolished to build the Victoria Terminus (now CSMT) directly on top of the same grounds.

== Services ==
Mumbai Suburban Railway services have trains with four main designations:

- Slow trains: (denoted by an S) stop at every station. These are intended for daily commuters.
- Fast trains: (denoted by an F) run express (skipping stops and going mainly to railway junctions) until a certain station, and from that station onward run like a slow train. These are intended for daily commuters as well as express connectivity to the rest of Indian Railways outbound trains.
- Air Conditioned trains: (denoted by an AC) which are air-conditioned and can be either fast or slow.

=== Travel classes ===
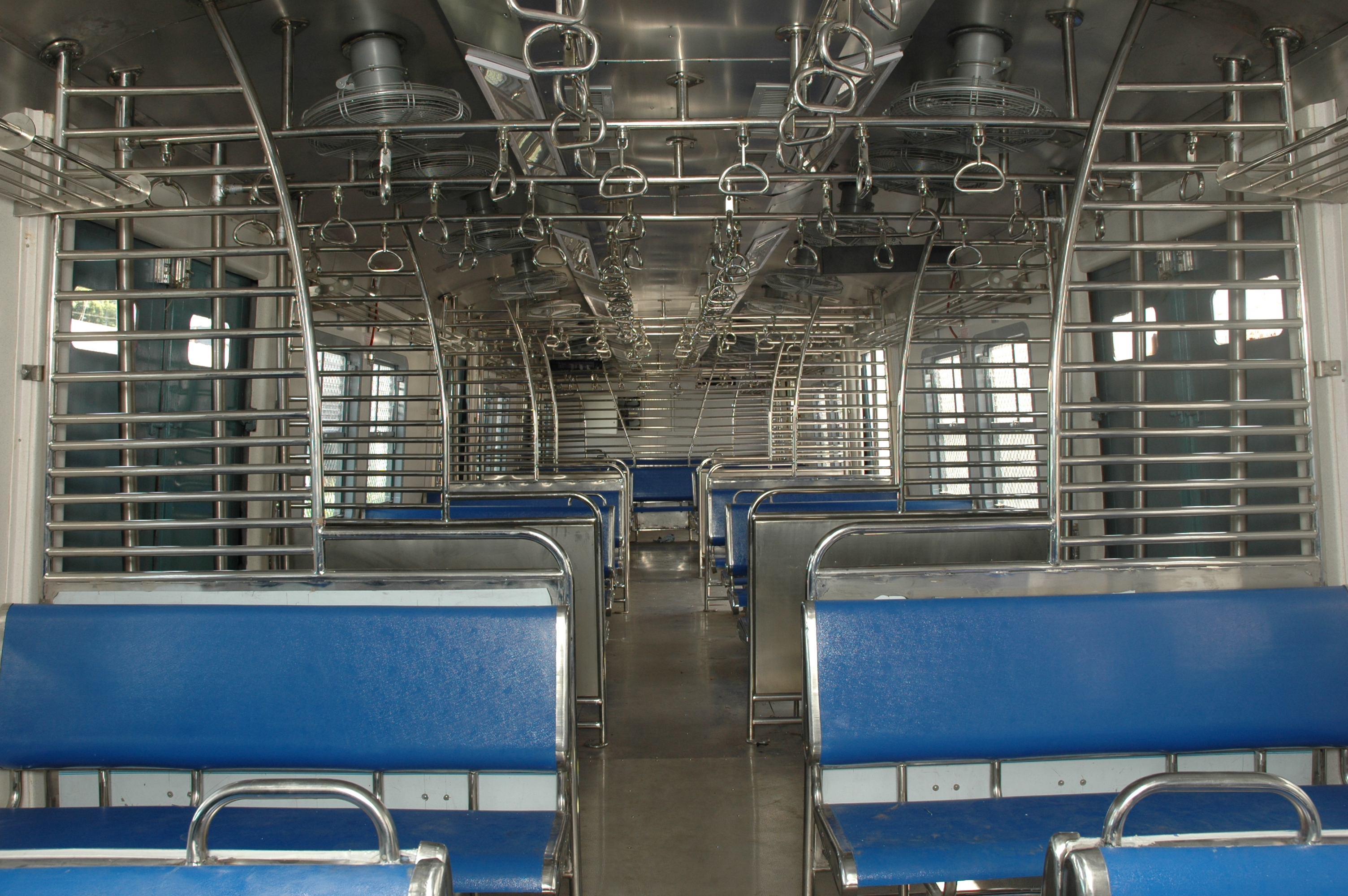
The interior of MRVC Siemens Rakes

The suburban fleet comprises 12- and 15-coach rakes. There are two main classes of travel: First Class and Second Class. The First Class fare is approximately eight times more expensive than that of Second Class, making it less crowded during non-rush hours. However, during rush hour, it can be equally or even more crowded than the general compartments, as many office employees possess a First Class transport pass provided by their employers. First Class and Senior Citizen compartments feature cushioned seating, while the other compartments typically have plastic seating. The available classes of travel are as follows:

- Class I (first class compartment): Commonly known as first class. The coach is designated by red and yellow slant stripes. The location of the same is designated by colouring the platform walls with similar stripes. The price is generally hiked up eight times to prevent the compartment overcrowding. The seats in this class are leather-made.
- Class II (general compartment): Also called second class. The seats in this class are plastic-made.
- Class I-L (Ladies first class): similar to normal First Class, reserved solely for females. Men are not allowed to travel, and may face a penalty. Some of the coaches of ladies' compartments are open to the general public between 23:00 and 06:00. These are indicated by a note near the doors of the compartments. The coach is designated by red and yellow slant stripes. The location of the same is designated by colouring the platform walls with similar stripes. This compartment is often adjacent to the ladies' general compartment.
- Class II-L (Ladies second class): This compartment is reserved solely for females. Men are not allowed to travel and can face a penalty. Male children are tolerated, though still not legal. Some of the coaches of ladies' compartments are open to the general public between 23:00 and 06:00. These are indicated by a note near the doors of the compartments. The coach is designated by green and yellow slant stripes. The location of the same is designated by colouring the platform walls with similar stripes.
- Divyangjan (Handicapped, Pregnant Ladies and Cancer patients compartment): for people with disabilities or cancer. On a platform, one can locate these by signs or by following a beeping sound indicator for the visually impaired, or also by following a yellow tactile path with a walking stick. These coaches are open to all genders. One needs a valid certificate of disability to board the compartment. Failure to do so may result in a penalty.
- Senior citizens: is reserved for passengers above the age of 60. These coaches are open to all genders. One needs a valid age proof to board the compartment. Failure to do so may result in a penalty.
- Luggage: heavy goods and luggage can be transported using this compartment. These compartments are spacious and only have seats along the walls, and are made to haul goods.

There are also women-only cars (termed ladies special), and since 1992, Ladies Special trains with the entire train seats reserved for women passengers. A semi ladies' special is a train with a few (e.g., three) coaches reserved for women. These designations can be combined with fast, slow, etc., with terms such as Slow Ladies Special, Fast Ladies Special, AC Ladies Special,etc.

=== Air-conditioned ===
The Mumbai Suburban Railways are known for their open doors and windows. This is because there is no ventilation system on the trains, and the train relies on natural air ventilation. This was introduced as a cost-saving measure, as an air-conditioning system would be rendered useless during rush hour. Leaving the doors open also allows for a fast boarding process, as the trains stop for only 10 seconds, to combat overcrowding. In 2016, the Indian Railways manufactured its first AC local train to provide better journeys in the hot and humid summer season. This rake is manufactured at the Integral Coach Factory, Chennai. It has several new facilities, such as connected vestibules and automatic doors. It runs from Virar to Churchgate on the Western line and Chhatrapati Shivaji Maharaj Terminus to Titwala and Badlapur on the Central line. AC trains include fast and slow locals and started their run from 25 December 2016 on WR and 30 January 2020 on CR.

=== Ticketing ===
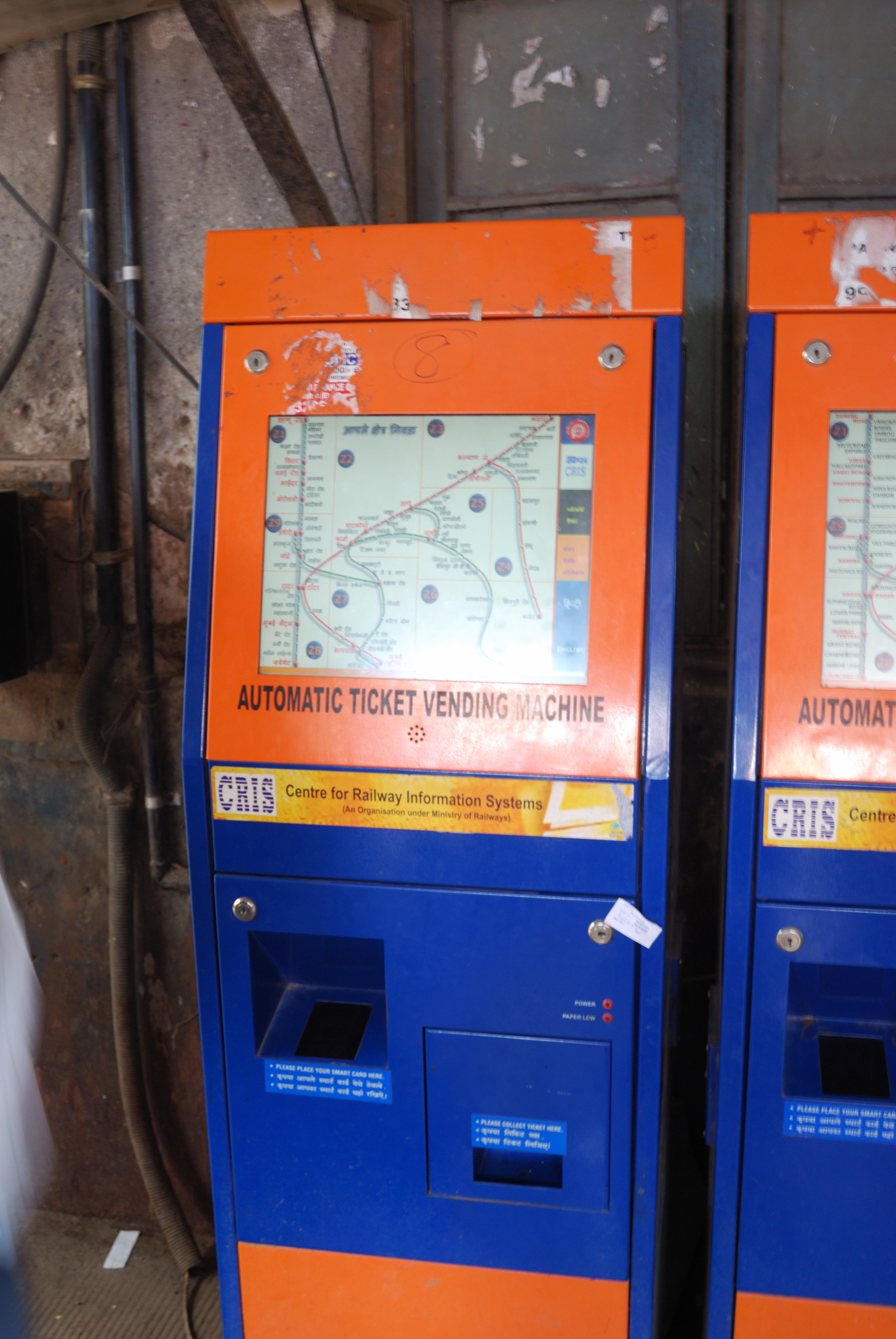
An Automatic Ticket Vending Machine (ATVM)

The Mumbai Suburban Railway uses a proof-of-payment fare collection system. Tickets can be purchased at every train station using CVMs and ATVMs. Travelling without a valid ticket is an offence and if caught, can result in a penalty. The penalty is steeper for passengers travelling in first class without a valid ticket.

Tickets can be bought for a single journey (one way) or a return journey. A return ticket is valid till the next day on weekdays and till Monday if purchased on a Friday. The ticket counters usually have long queues.

Tourist tickets are valid for one, three, or five days and can be purchased up to three days in advance.

Platform tickets are required to be purchased by those members of the public not boarding trains, but who wish to access the platforms at all stations, perhaps for the purpose of receiving or seeing off a passenger and also to use footbridges or using commercial couriers (Angadias) These cost ₹10 (11¢ US) per hour. A person can be penalised for non-possession of this ticket.

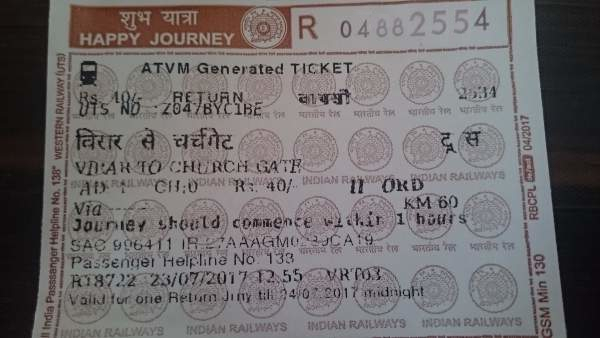
A 2017 Mumbai Suburban Railway ATVM ticket, from Virar to Churchgate

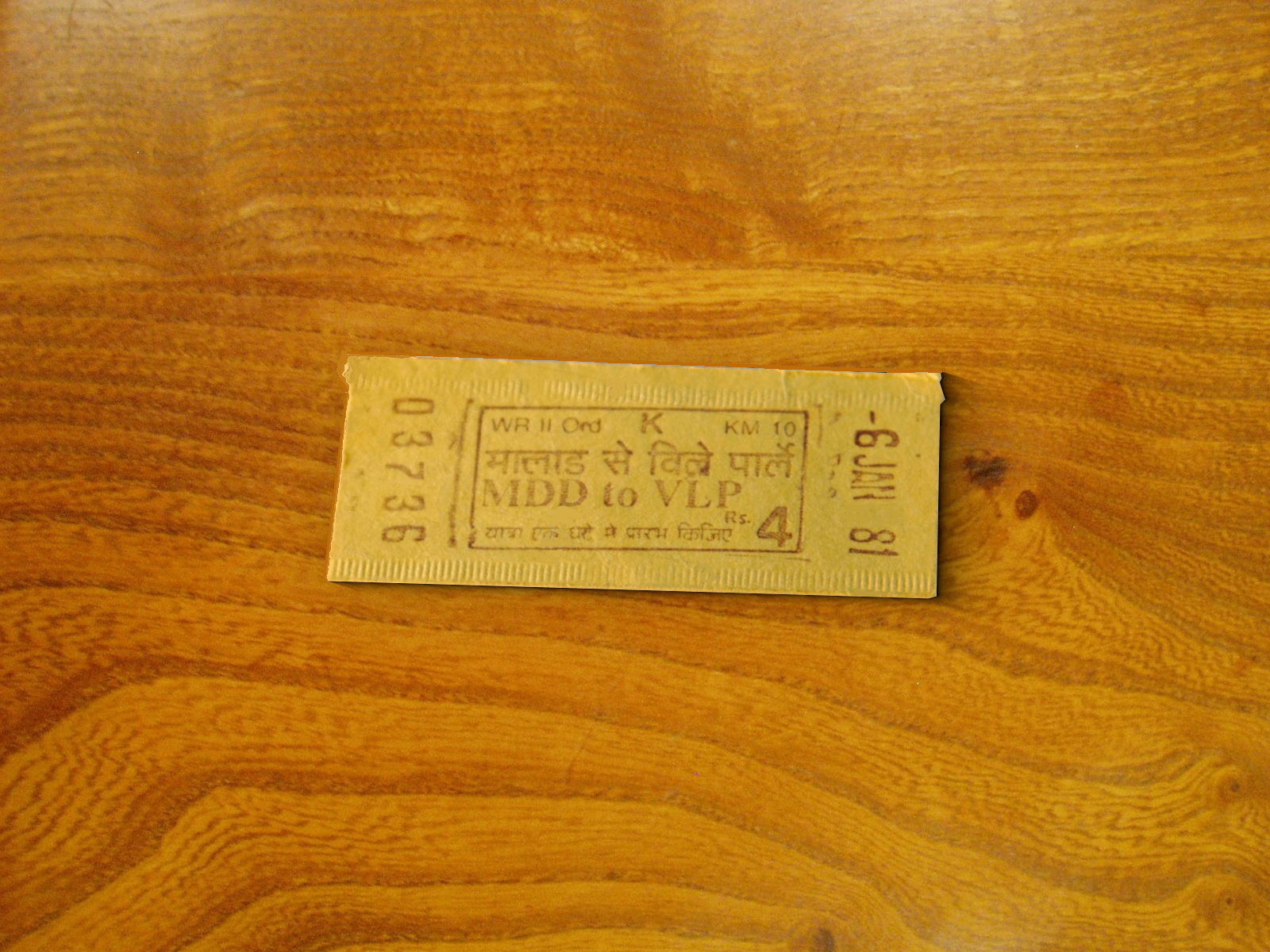
A 1981 Bombay Suburban Railway ticket from Malad to Vile Parle

CVMs and ATVMs

To save time, a Coupon Booklet can be purchased, and the coupons can be punched for the designated fare at Coupon Validating Machines (CVMs) at every station. The ticket fares matrix is pasted above the CVM. As of October 2012, there are approximately 575 CVMs on Mumbai Suburban Railway stations. The Central Railway network has 350, and the Western Line has 225.

In early 2015, the authorities decided to discontinue CVMs w.e.f 1 April 2015. This decision was taken due to extensive duplication of the coupons and the lack of transparency. The coupons were also lacking a way to trace them.

There are also reloadable Smart Cards, and riders can use them to print tickets for themselves from an Automatic Ticket Vending Machine (ATVMs). A seasonal ticket is available for regular commuters. Riders can choose the validity of these tickets from 1-month, three months, or a year. Season Tickets are the most cost-effective and time-efficient option for regular commuters.

In 2022, the ATVM added new payment methods. Initially, it has only the Railway Smart Card payment option. But with the new payment methods, ticketing has become much faster. It has two features, the first one is BHIM UPI QR CODE (Pay by Paytm) and the second one is BHIM UPI QR CODE (Pay by Freecharge).

Mobile app

==== UTS ====
The ticket counters usually have long queues. In order to bring a solution to this problem, the UTSOnMobile app was launched by the railways minister Suresh Prabhu at Dadar railway station in December 2014. This app was launched initially for Android and Windows Phone, with the iOS version developed later.

After signing up, the user has the option to load the prepaid RWallet built in the app, using credit/debit cards, net banking, IMPS or private mobile-based apps. After the RWallet is loaded, the app can be used to book tickets on the entire network. Alternatively, the user may book tickets directly using credit/debit cards, net banking, IMPS, UPI, or various digital wallets such as PayTM, MobiKwik etc. for payments within the app without having to load the prepaid RWallet.

Initially, the ticket booked on the app had to be printed from the ATVMs. This step was found tedious by the commuters and was criticised. Later, in July 2015, an update for the app was launched, which made e-tickets acceptable. The update also brought technical changes, like the tickets could be booked only within a radius of 30m to 5 km of the origin station, and not from the platform. This move was well received by commuters, which resulted in over 50,000 downloads on the launch day. However, it was discontinued on the 1st of March, 2026 and replaced by RailOne.

===== RailOne =====
However, due to multiple applications existing to provide a range of services, all of which were considered essential for passengers, the decision was made to consolidate these services into a single "superapp" that would serve as a singular interface for passengers. Thus the RailOne was launched and included the ability to book Reserved, Unreserved and Platform tickets. Similar to the functionality provided by the UTSOnMobile app, the payment gateway includes an prepaid RWallet option which can be loaded with funds and gives a 3% percent discount, debit/credit card option, netbanking option, IMPS and UPI options as well. However, some implementation issues such as the lack of geofencing which was present on UTSOnMobile and prevented passengers from booking tickets when they were physically situated outside of a 5km radius of the origin station, have led to instances of ticketless travel occurring.

=== Security ===
The Railway Protection Force (RPF) and the Government Railway Police (GRP) are responsible for the Security of the Mumbai Suburban Railway.

The RPF is a security force under the authority of the Indian Ministry of Railways established by the Railway Protection Force Act, 1957 has the power to search, arrest, investigate and prosecute, though the ultimate power rests in the hands of the GRP.

The GRP is the main police force established by the Railways Act, 1989. The GRP's responsibility is to observe law and order on all railway property. The force is under joint-control of the Indian Ministry of Railways and the Maharashtra Police. Its duties correspond to those of the District Police in the areas under their jurisdiction, such as patrolling, but only on railway property. It also aids and provides assistance to the Railway Protection Force.

== Safety issues ==
=== Doors ===
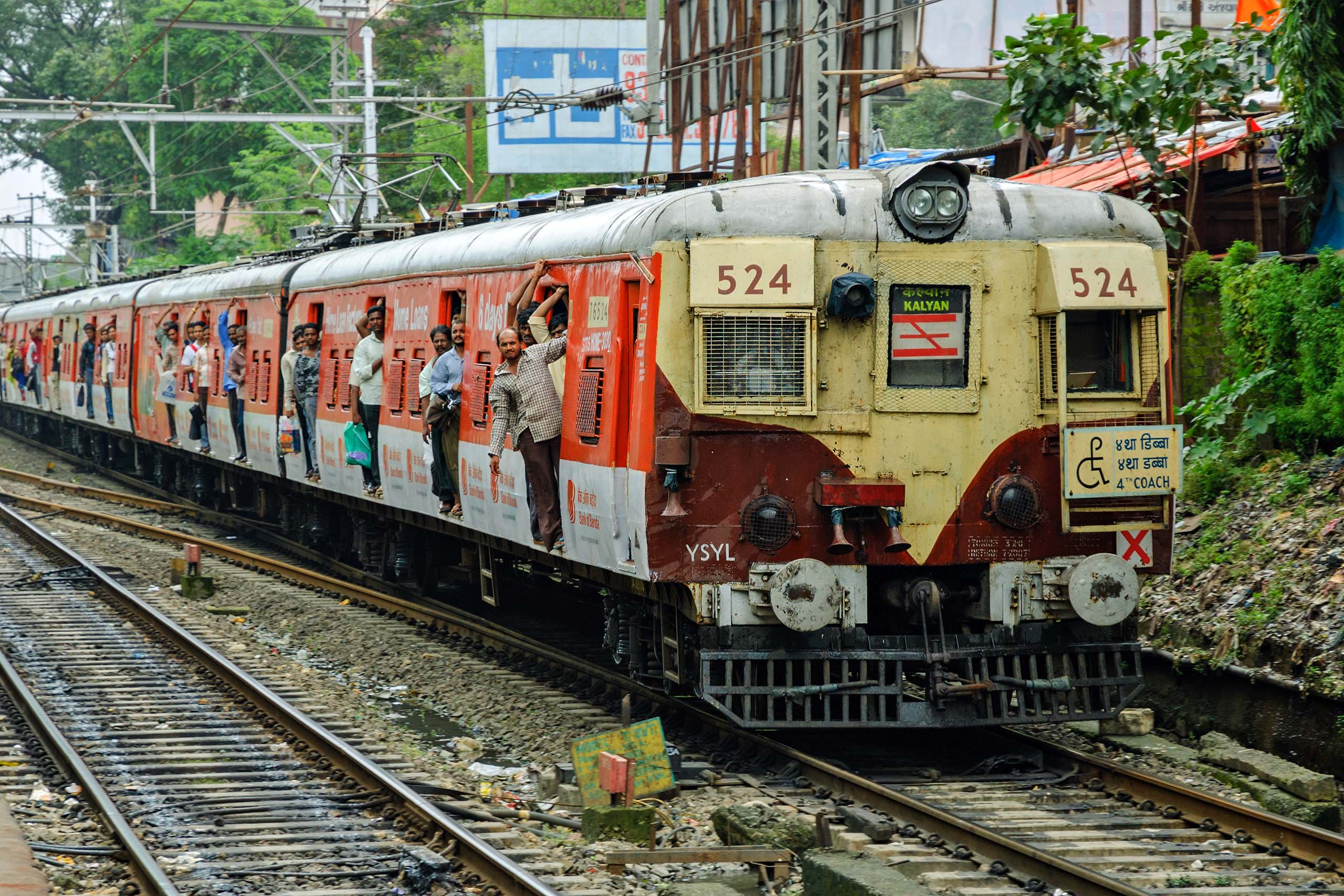
Mumbai Suburban Railway passengers hanging off doors, Mumbai, India

The Mumbai Suburban Railway is known for its open doors and windows. This is because there is no ventilating system on the trains, and the train relies on natural air ventilation. This was introduced as a cost-saving measure, as an air-conditioning system would be rendered useless during rush hour. Leaving the doors open also allows for a fast boarding process and turnaround time, as the trains stop for only 10 seconds, and are at most 5 minutes apart, to combat overcrowding. Passengers often end up hanging off the edge of the footboard, off door ledges, and during rush hour, they can lose balance and fall to their death. Teenagers and adults also attempt to perform stunts of the doorway and door ladders, thus risking their lives. Windows also have a wired grill on them to prevent theft and chain snatching. However, passengers frequently spit paan masala, mava and gutka while hanging off doors, which ends up entering through the open window grilles. There are also numerous records of people tripping and falling down every day while getting on and off the train, when the train is in motion, thus resulting in injury or death

=== Overcrowding ===
Due to its extensive reach across the Mumbai Metropolitan Region, and its intensive use by the local urban population, the Mumbai Suburban Railway suffers from the most severe overcrowding in the world. Over 4,500 passengers are packed into a 12-car or 15-car rake during peak hours, as against the rated carrying capacity of around 2,000. This has resulted in what is known as Super-Dense Crush Load of 14 to 16 standing passengers per square metre of floor space.

=== Fatalities ===
From 2002 to 2012, an average of 3,700 people were killed yearly on the Mumbai Suburban Rail network; more than 36,152 people died, and 36,688 people were injured during this period. A record 17 people died every weekday on the city's suburban railway network in 2008 Overcrowding is frequently blamed for the incidents. Another cause of death is passengers crossing the tracks on foot to avoid footbridges. Some passengers die when they sit on train roofs to avoid the crowds and are electrocuted by overhead electric cables, or fall while hanging from doors and window bars. Deaths declined in 2018. To reduce the risk of such fatalities, longer platforms and more frequent trains are being implemented.

Central Railways in association with a behaviour architecture firm deployed psychology-based interventions at the Wadala station, reducing fatalities by about 75%.

In 2010, Western Railway pledged that its trains would stop running if "even a single person" was seen travelling on the roof.

In mid-2011, a viral video depicted a youth performing stunts while dangling from the compartment of a Harbour Line train. Following this, a boy was killed while imitating the actions performed in the video.

The Western and Central Railways have been using the Auxiliary Warning System (AWS), a type of Train Protection & Warning System (TPWS), since 1996, not dissimilar to the Automatic Warning System of England.

The Central Railway and Western Railway introduced a Blue Light (Virtual Gate) concept, the Blue beam light unit, which will be mounted on the top of each Gate, guiding the Commuter for Safe Boarding, avoiding overcrowding and ensuring safe clearance in the Platforms. It also helps to create a Cultural Transformation in the Behaviour of the Commuter.

=== Terrorism ===
The Mumbai Suburban Railway has suffered eight explosive attacks, and around 368 people are believed to have died as a result.

- 12 March 1993 – Bomb blast at Reay Road
- 13 March 2003 – A bombing in a train in Mulund killed 20 people
- 11 July 2006 – A series of seven bombs in Western Railway trains killed 209 people
- 26 November 2008 – Chhatrapati Shivaji Terminus was attacked during the 2008 Mumbai Attacks killing at least 60 people

=== Tourism ===
Tourist usage of the Mumbai Suburban Railways has seen popularity as a way to explore the day-to-day life of the city, and as such, the Central Railway has issued circulars advising tourists not to travel in the trains from 07:00 to 11:00 and 17:00 to 22:00 during weekdays because of overcrowding.

== Expansion ==
To enable the Mumbai Suburban Railway to meet the demands of the ever-growing passenger traffic, the federal Government of India's Ministry of Railways and the state Government of Maharashtra have jointly envisioned the constitution of a separate corporate entity to operate the system.

The Mumbai Railway Vikas Corporation (MRVC), a public sector unit of the Government of India under the Ministry of Railways, was incorporated under the (Indian) Companies Act, 1956 on 12 July 1999, with an equity capital of ₹250 million (US$2.7 million) to implement the rail component of an integrated rail-cum-road urban transport project, called Mumbai Urban Transport Project (MUTP). The cost of the rail component of the project is to be shared equally by the Ministry of Railways and the Government of Maharashtra.

MRVC, under the Mumbai Urban Transport Project-II, has completed the Harbour Line up to Goregaon. Further extension of this line has been accepted under MUTP-III till Borivali.

CR has constructed a 22.5 kilometres (14.0 mi) line linking Nerul / CBD Belapur with Uran. The line would have 10 stations. This project is divided into two phases.

- In Phase I, Bamandongari and Kharkopar are fully operational, and Targhar station is still under construction. But the construction of Sagar Sangam railway station has been temporarily postponed until the completion of the railway line within the time limit of October 2018 till the later phase.
- In Phase-II, the Construction of all stations lying between Kharkopar and Uran is completed & flagged off by PM Narendra Modi on 12 January 2024.

CR has proposed a service from Kalyan Junction to Nasik Road, giving a boost to commuters to and from Nasik, since there are currently only three Intercity trains to Manmad (Lokmanya Tilak Terminus–Manmad Godavari Express, Panchvati Express and Manmad Rajya Rani Express) operating from Mumbai. This distance is 132 km regular, meeting the Indian Railways criteria for EMU services CR has announced that it will carry out trial runs, however it has difficulty due to the Kasara Ghat tunnels.

== Schedule of trains ==
Western Railway Daily AC Service Allocation (04:00 AM – 01:00 AM)
Direction	Route Termini Range	Morning Phase (04:00 AM – 01:00 PM)	Afternoon Phase (01:00 PM – 04:00 PM)	Evening/Night Phase (04:00 PM – 01:00 AM)
UP (Southbound)	Virar – Churchgate	High Density (Runs every 8-15mins) Primary peak administrative runs	Low Density (Runs every 12-20 mins) Mid-day schedule spacing	Moderate Density (Runs every 10-15 mins) Intermittent inbound positioning runs
UP (Southbound)	Borivali – Churchgate	High Density (Runs every 10 mins)	Moderate Density (Runs every 20 mins)	Low Density (Runs every 15 mins)
UP (Southbound)	Bhayandar / Goregaon – Churchgate	Moderate Density (Runs every 25 mins)	Low Density (Runs every 60 mins)	Low Density (Runs every 60 mins)
DOWN (Northbound)	Churchgate – Virar	Moderate Density (Runs every 12-15 mins) Reverse peak routing	Low Density (Runs every 15–25 mins) Mid-day schedule spacing	High Density (Runs every 10–14 mins) Primary peak outbound dispersal
DOWN (Northbound)	Churchgate – Borivali	Moderate Density (Runs every 15 mins)	Moderate Density (Runs every 15 mins)	High Density (Runs every 10 mins)
DOWN (Northbound)	Churchgate – Bhayandar / Goregaon	Low Density (Runs every 60 mins)	Low Density (Runs every 60 mins)	Moderate Density (Runs every 25 mins)

=== Central Railway corridor deployment ===
The Central Railway operates 120 daily AC local services, which includes 92 services on the Main Line corridor and 28 services serving the Harbour Line network.

Central Railway Daily AC Service Allocation (04:00 AM – 01:00 AM)
Direction	Route Termini Range	Morning Phase (04:00 AM – 01:00 PM)	Afternoon Phase (01:00 PM – 04:00 PM)	Evening/Night Phase (04:00 PM – 01:00 AM)
UP (Southbound)	Kalyan / Dombivli / Thane – CSMT	High Density (Runs every 20–25 mins) Heavy suburban inbound commute	Low Density (Runs every 50–60 mins) Mid-day track space allocation	Moderate Density (Runs every 45 mins) Repositioning runs before midnight
UP (Southbound)	Titwala / Ambarnath / Badlapur – CSMT	Moderate Density (Runs every 30 mins)	Low Density (Runs every 60 mins)	Low Density (Runs every 60 mins)
UP (Southbound)	Panvel / Belapur / Vashi – CSMT	Moderate Density (Runs every 25 mins)	Low Density (Runs every 45 mins)	Low Density (Runs every 45 mins)
DOWN (Northbound)	CSMT – Kalyan / Dombivli / Thane	Moderate Density (Runs every 45 mins) Reverse peak routing	Low Density (Runs every 50–60 mins) Mid-day track space allocation	High Density (Runs every 20–25 mins) Heavy peak outbound dispersal
DOWN (Northbound)	CSMT – Titwala / Ambarnath / Badlapur	Low Density (Runs every 60 mins)	Low Density (Runs every 60 mins)	Moderate Density (Runs every 30 mins)
DOWN (Northbound)	CSMT – Vashi / Belapur / Panvel	Low Density (Runs every 45 mins)	Low Density (Runs every 45 mins)	Moderate Density (Runs every 25 mins)

=== Operational calendar constraints ===
- Weekend Holiday Adjustments: Central Railway AC local train fleets operate strictly from Monday to Saturday. On Sundays and nominated national holidays, these specific AC service slots revert completely to traditional Non-AC rakes to facilitate regional engineering blocks.
- Western Line Seven-Day Schedule: Western Railway AC local service schedules run continuously across all seven days of the week without Sunday rollbacks.

=== Harbour and Trans-Harbour AC timeline architecture ===
The Central Railway operates 28 daily air-conditioned (AC) suburban services serving the Harbour line infrastructure, running strictly from Monday to Saturday. The scheduling is built around core transit blocks operating between 05:00 AM and 12:00 AM (midnight) to facilitate trans-city commuting to Navi Mumbai and Thane.

=== Harbour Line AC timeline slots ===
The Harbour Line utilizes specialized 12-car AC rakes operating across the CSMT–Panvel, CSMT–Vashi, and CSMT–Belapur sectors.

Harbour Line AC Schedule Blocks (05:00 AM – Midnight)
Direction	Operational Time Block	Route Termini Track	Schedule Block Characteristics
UP (Southbound)	Early Morning (04:15 AM – 08:30 AM)	Panvel to CSMT Belapur to CSMT	Opens with the 04:15 AM departure from Panvel. Heavy deployment follows between 06:00 AM and 08:30 AM to catch early-shift South Mumbai workers.
UP (Southbound)	Mid-Day Phase (11:00 AM – 04:00 PM)	Vashi to CSMT Panvel to Wadala Road	Balanced off-peak return runs. Services alternate destinations to reposition fleet components before evening outward movements.
UP (Southbound)	Evening Return (05:00 PM – 09:30 PM)	Panvel to CSMT	Inbound clearing runs running roughly every 45 minutes to transport reverse-commuters back into the city core.
DOWN (Northbound)	Morning Outbound (05:00 AM – 09:00 AM)	CSMT to Panvel	Commences with the early 05:06 AM departure from CSMT. Provides high-capacity clearance for corporate nodes in Navi Mumbai.
DOWN (Northbound)	Afternoon Phase (12:00 PM – 04:30 PM)	CSMT to Vashi Wadala Road to Panvel	Mid-day operational link featuring departures like the 13:17 PM CSMT–Vashi rake to handle student and off-peak travel loads.
DOWN (Northbound)	Evening Rush (05:00 PM – 11:30 PM)	CSMT to Panvel CSMT to Belapur	Peak outflow density featuring major priority slots, including the 17:30 PM CSMT to Panvel fast-path corridor service.

=== Trans-Harbour Line AC timeline slots ===
The Trans-Harbour Line operates connecting services linking Thane directly to Navi Mumbai industrial zones via the Thane–Vashi and Thane–Panvel corridors.

Trans-Harbour Line AC Schedule Blocks (05:00 AM – Midnight)
Direction	Operational Time Block	Route Termini Track	Schedule Block Characteristics
UP (Southbound)	Morning Industrial (06:00 AM – 10:30 AM)	Panvel / Vashi to Thane	Concentrated transit block catering to Thane-bound industrial and tech-park employees from the Navi Mumbai residential belts.
UP (Southbound)	Evening Phase (04:30 PM – 09:00 PM)	Panvel to Thane	Return positioning slots handling closing-hour factory and corporate shifts across the Rabale–Koparkhairane belt.
DOWN (Northbound)	Morning Outbound (07:00 AM – 11:00 AM)	Thane to Vashi / Panvel	Outbound workforce dispersal originating from Thane station directly into the Airoli and APMC market zones.
DOWN (Northbound)	Night/Closing Phase (05:30 PM – 11:00 PM)	Thane to Panvel	High-density evening corridor return services operating up until the late-night maintenance cut-off windows.

=== Technical and holiday scheduling limitations ===
- Sunday Rake Reversion: All 28 scheduled Harbour AC services revert automatically to standard Non-AC rakes on Sundays. This accommodates the localized engineering blocks ("Mega-Blocks") mandated by Central Railway engineers.
- Wadala Junction Speed Restrictions: Because AC rakes possess different weight profiles, timing paths across the sharp layout curves at Wadala Road require specific clearance margins, preventing the insertion of intermediate fast-line adjustments.

== In popular culture ==
=== Film ===
The Mumbai Suburban Railway has regularly been used for film shoots. Some movies that have used the Mumbai Suburban Railway for filming are:

- Ghulam
- Slumdog Millionaire
- Agneepath
- Wanted
- Gangs of Wasseypur
- Life in a Metro
- Ghanchakkar
- O Kadhal Kanmani
- Once Upon a Time in Mumbai Again
- Rajjo
- RaOne
- Thalaivaa
- Dombivli Fast
- Balkadu
- Mumbai Meri Jaan
- The Train
- Yeh Jawani Hai Deewani
- Saathiya
- Zombivli
- Baaton Baaton Mein
- Badlapur
- Ek Chalis Ki Last Local
- Taxi No. 9211

== See also ==
- Urban rail transit in India
- Mumbai Metro
- Mumbai Monorail
- Mumbai Water Metro
- Salsette–Trombay Railway
- Hyderabad Multi-Modal Transport System
- List of Mumbai Suburban Railway stations
- 11 July 2006 Mumbai train bombings
- M-Indicator
