= Mumbai Railway Vikas Corporation =

Indian railway infrastructure developer

- Company type: Public sector undertaking
- Industry: Rail transport
- Founded: 12 July 1999; 26 years ago
- Headquarters: Churchgate, Mumbai, India
- Area served: Mumbai Metropolitan Region
- Key people: Shri Subhash Chand Gupta (Chairman & MD)
- Revenue: ▲₹131.93 crore (US$14 million) (2022-23)
- Net income: ▲₹87.42 crore (US$9.1 million) (2022-23)
- Owner: Ministry of Railways (51%); Government of Maharashtra (49%)
- Number of employees: 239 (31 March 2023)
- Website: mrvc.indianrailways.gov.in

Mumbai Railway Vikas Corporation (MRVC) is an Indian public sector undertaking responsible for executing railway projects under the Mumbai Urban Transport Project (MUTP) as sanctioned by Ministry of Railways for enhancing suburban rail transportation. It was incorporated under the Companies Act, 1956 on 12 July 1999 with an equity capital of Rs. 25 crore shared in the ratio of 51:49 between Ministry of Railways and Government of Maharashtra. MRVC is also involved in the planning and development of the Mumbai Suburban Rail system.

The main objectives of MUTP are:

- Bringing down the passengers per 9 coach to 3000 as against the existing 5000.
- Segregate the suburban train operation from the main line passenger and freight services

== Objectives ==
- Integrate suburban rail capacity enhancement plans with the urban development plans for Mumbai and propose investments.
- Implement rail infrastructure projects in Mumbai's suburban sections.
- Commercially develop Mumbai's railway land and airspace to raise funds for suburban railway development.
- Resettle and rehabilitate project affected people.
