= Navi Mumbai Metro =

Mass Rapid Transit System in Navi Mumbai

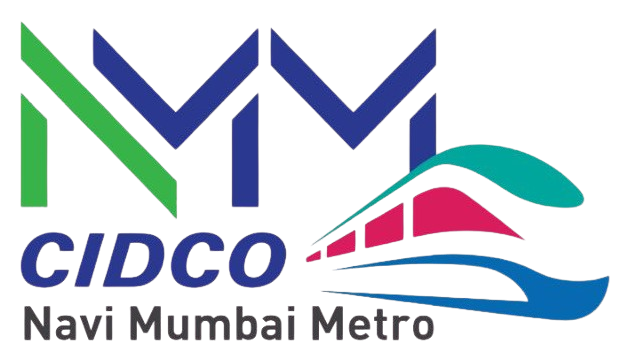

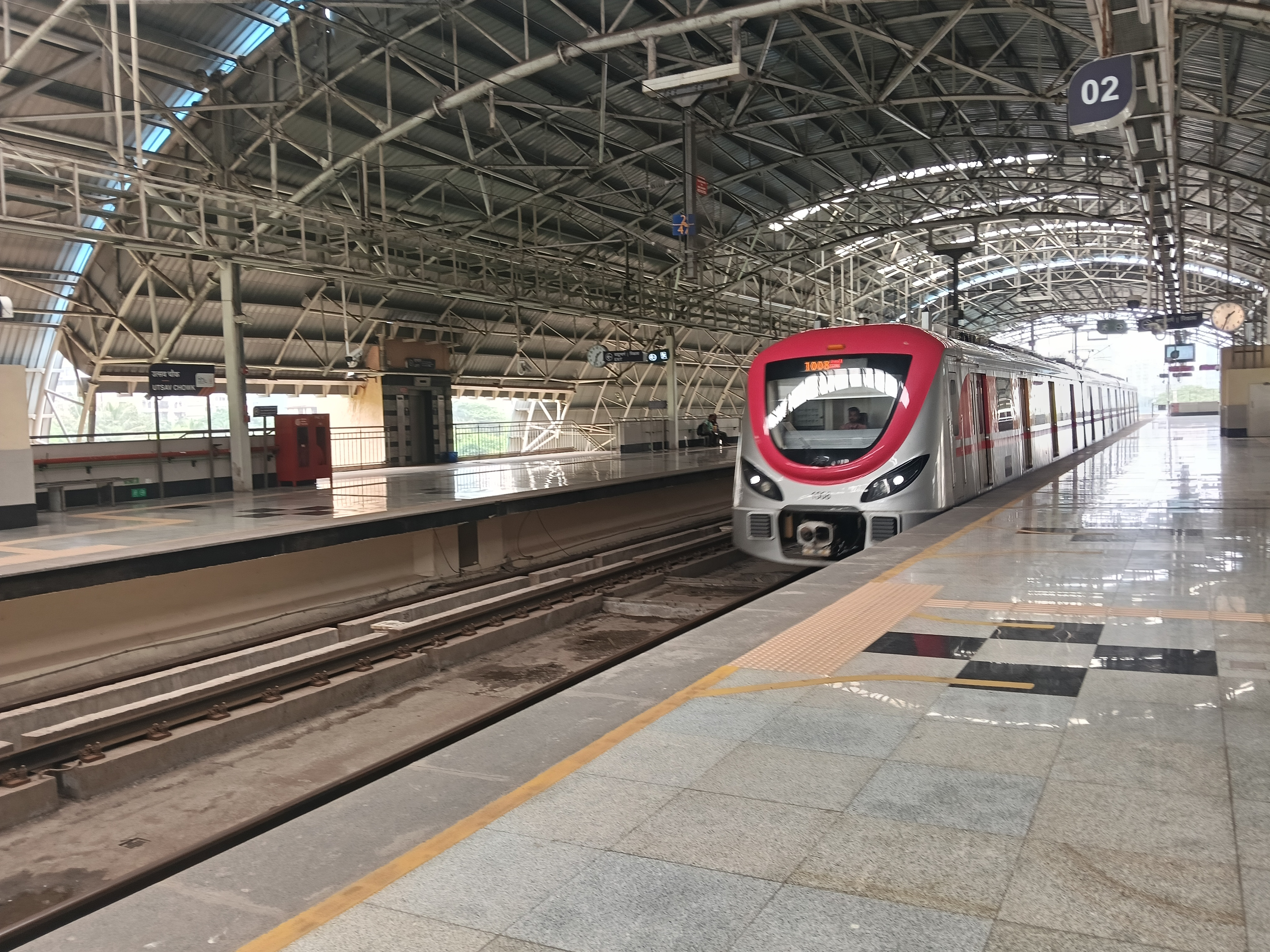
- Utsav Chowk Metro Station

Overview
- Owner: City and Industrial Development Corporation (CIDCO)
- Locale: Navi Mumbai, Maharashtra, India.
- Transit type: Rapid transit.
- Number of lines: 1; 4 (planned)
- Line number: Operational: Line 1 (Phase-I–CBD Belapur–Pendhar) Approved: Line 1 (Phase-II–Pendhar–Navi Mumbai International Airport.[4]].)
- Number of stations: 11 (Phase-I)
- Headquarters: CIDCO Bhavan, Sion Panvel Highway, CBD Belapur, Navi Mumbai

Operation
- Began operation: 17 November 2023; 3 years ago
- Operator: Maha Metro
- Character: Elevated
- Train length: 3 coaches

Technical
- System length: 23.4 km (14.5 mi) (Phase-I); 83 km (52 mi) (planned); 106.4 km (66.1 mi) (proposed)
- Track gauge: 1,435 mm (4 ft 8 1/2 in) standard gauge
- Electrification: 25 kV 50 Hz AC overhead catenary.
- Average speed: 60 km/h (37 mph)
- Top speed: 90 km/h (56 mph)
System map
.

The Navi Mumbai Metro is a rapid transit system in the city of Navi Mumbai, Maharashtra, India. The planning and construction of the Navi Mumbai Metro were overseen by the City and Industrial Development Corporation (CIDCO). The system currently has 1 line and more lines are currently in the planning phase, with the extension of line 1 to the Navi Mumbai International Airport. The foundation stone. for the project was laid on 1 May 2011, with a target completion date of 2014. After over 9 years of delays due to slowdowns in construction caused by a lack of labour and adequate funding, along with land acquisition issues, the Line 1 of the metro commenced operations on 17 November 2023.

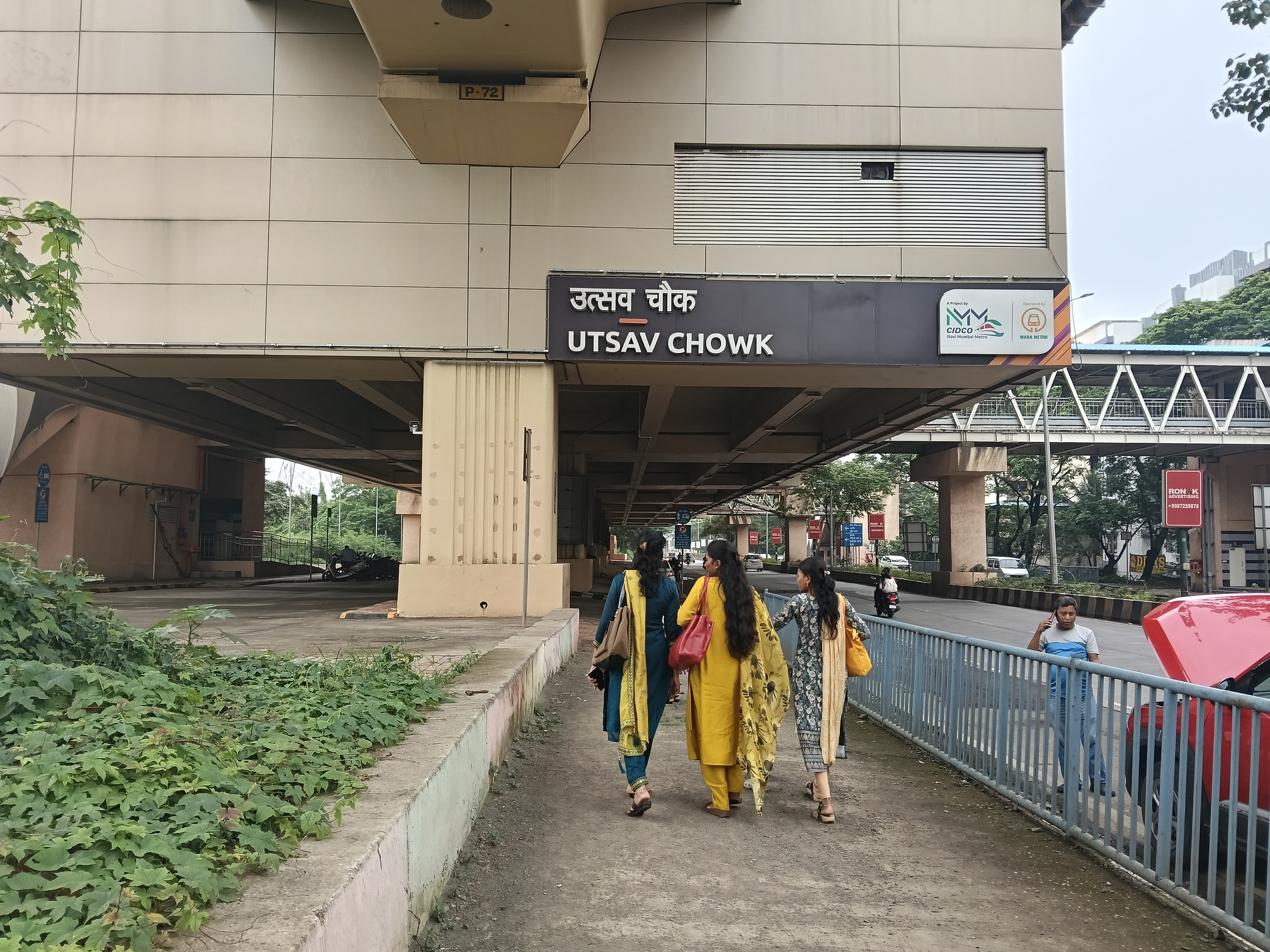
Basement of the Utsav Chowk Metro Station at Kharghar in Navi Mumbai

== History ==
The Navi Mumbai Metro project received formal approval on 29 April 2010, and a public hearing on 21 May 2010 reported no major objections to the plan. CIDCO was named as the implementing agency of the Belapur–Pendhar–Kalamboli–Khandeshwar line under the Indian Tramway Act, 1886, by the Government of Maharashtra on 30 September 2010. The metro's foundation stone was laid on 1 May 2011 by Chief Minister Prithviraj Chavan, and general foundation work on the system's first phase commenced in October 2011. In March 2012, CIDCO released the metro's complete master plan, including a proposed connection to the Mumbai Metro. In February 2017, RITES submitted an interim detailed project report (DPR) for Lines II, III, and IV of the Navi Mumbai Metro.

In February 2013, thousands of villagers in the Navi Mumbai area protested against CIDCO's inaction on local housing developments and its failure to provide restitution for locals affected by infrastructure projects. The protesters pledged to "shut down the CIDCO head office and all development projects in the region. These will include the metro project and any progress on the airport project".

== Network ==
The Navi Mumbai Metro is planned to consist of five lines, totaling 106.4 kilometres (66.1 mi) in length. As of 2026, the system consists of one operational line, Line 1.

=== Line 1 ===
All the phases of Line 1 will be constructed and funded by CIDCO. Lines 2 and 3 will be funded by the Navi Mumbai Municipal Corporation and Mumbai Metropolitan Region Development Authority respectively. The total cost of Line 1 is estimated to be ₹3,063.63 crore (equivalent to ₹33 billion or US$360 million in 2026). The line recorded 1.15 crore (11.5 million) riders by November 2025, two years after its commencement.

==== Construction ====
The 23.40-kilometre (14.54 mi) Line 1 consists of 20 stations. The proposed route will link CBD Belapur, Kharghar, Taloja, Taloja MIDC, Kalamboli, Kamothe and the Khandeshwar railway station, terminating at the proposed Navi Mumbai International Airport.

In mid-2012, CIDCO awarded the ₹321 crore (US$34 million) contract for the construction of the 11.1 km (6.9 mi) section from Belapur to Pendhar to a consortium of Sanjose (Spain), Mahavira Road and Infrastructure (Navi Mumbai), and Supreme Infrastructure (Mumbai). The original deadline to complete the project was in 2016. This was later extended to mid-2017, and then mid-2018. By January 2017, only 60% of the work on the stations had been completed. Finding the progress of work to be unsatisfactory, CIDCO sent a notice terminating the contract to the consortium on 11 January 2017. On 1 March 2017, CIDCO floated new tenders to construct 11 stations along the Belapur-Pendhar section. The previous contractors had completed 60% of the work on the stations. The new contract with worth ₹141 crore (US$15 million). Line 1 is planned to be developed in 3 phases:

Line 1
| Phase | Terminal | Length | Stations | Cost | Status |
|---|---|---|---|---|---|
| I | Belapur-Kharghar-Taloja-Pendhar | 11.10 kilometres (6.90 mi) | 11 | ₹3,063 crore (US$330 million) | Operational |
| II | MIDC Taloja-Kalamboli–Khandeshwar (extension to airport proposed) | 7.12 kilometres (4.42 mi) | 8 | ₹2,820 crore (US$300 million) | Planned |
| III | Interlink between Pendhar and MIDC | 3.87 kilometres (2.40 mi) | 1 | ₹1,750 crore (US$190 million) | Planned |
| IV | Khandeshwar to NMIA | 4.17 kilometres (2.59 mi) | 1 | ₹1,270 crore (US$140 million) | Planned |
| Total | | 26.2 kilometres (16.3 mi) | 20 | ₹4,068 crore (US$430 million) | Partially operational |

== Infrastructure ==
An international consortium of companies including Ansaldo STS, Tata Project and CSR Zhuzhou will provide the electrical and mechanical systems for the first phase of Line 1. Ansaldo will conduct systems integration and supply train control systems, telecoms, fare collection systems and equipment storage. The metro's standard gauge Network would be electrified at 25 kV AC, with power provided via an overhead catenary.

=== Rolling stock ===
In 2014, the Chinese company CSR Zhuzhou signed a contract with CIDCO to supply rolling stock for the first phase of the metro's Line 1. The three-car trainsets are 64.6 metres (212 ft) long and 3.1 metres (10 ft 2 in) wide, with a passenger capacity of around 1,100 and a maximum speed of 90 km/h (56 mph). The trains feature stainless steel bodies, air-conditioning and LED lighting.

== Status updates ==
Construction of Navi Mumbai Metro Line 1 progressed steadily from 2018, with trial runs starting in 2019 and delays due to COVID-19 pushing completion to 2024. After receiving safety clearances, the line was opened for commercial operations on November 17, 2023, and reinaugurated by PM Modi in January 2024.

== See also ==
- Urban rail transit in India
  - Mumbai Metro
- List of metro systems
- Public transport in Mumbai
