= Kamothe =

Kamothe Mansarovar / Khandeshwar
- Node
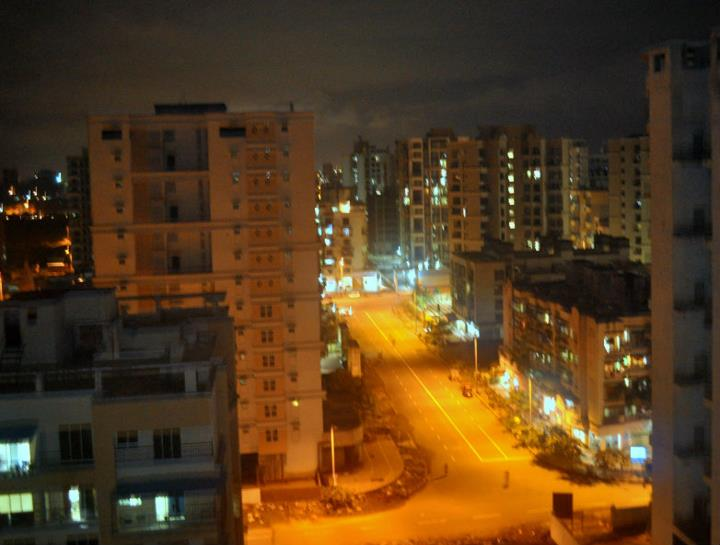
- Kamothe-Sector36 at night
- Interactive map of Kamothe
- Coordinates: 19.016804°N 73.096461°E
- Country: India
- State: Maharashtra
- City: Navi Mumbai
- District: Raigad
- Taluka: Panvel
- Founder: CIDCO

Government
  - Body: Panvel Municipal Corporation
- Elevation: 10 m (33 ft)

Population (2016)
  - Total: 250,000

Official Language - Marathi
- Time zone: UTC+5:30 (IST)
- PIN: 410206/410209
- Telephone code: 022 --------
- Vehicle registration: MH 46 (Navi Mumbai's Raigad district),

Kamothe is a node of Navi Mumbai in the Raigad District, developed and maintained by CIDCO. It is located on the Sion Panvel Highway and is the third node towards Mumbai after Panvel and Kalamboli. It is divided into 48 sectors though much of it is developed only till sector 38.

== Location ==
The site of Kamothe adjoins the Central Business District of Belapur (CBD Belapur) and is surrounded by Kharghar in its north, Taloja in north-east, Kalamboli in its east and Panvel in its south. The western region of Kamothe is a wet land area with enormous mangroves and towards the western side, this bed of mangroves will end thus giving way to the upcoming Navi Mumbai International Airport, which has become operational since December 26, 2025. Which can be viewed from the edges of the town due to its elevated position. Kamothe is nestled between the NH548 (connecting to JNPT road) and the Mumbai-Satara Highway. The site is also connected to the small village- Jui Gaon.

== Characteristics ==
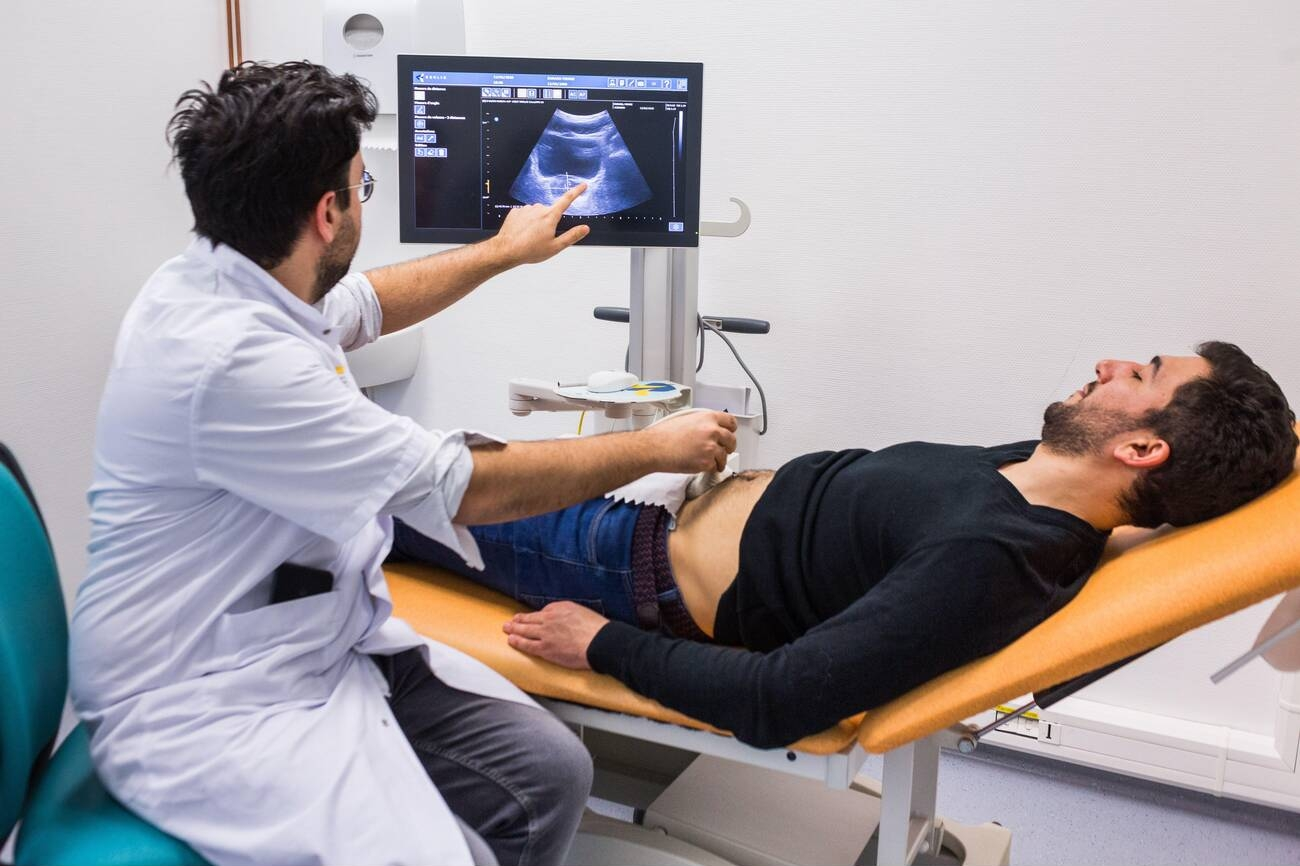
A modern outpatient clinical setup for diagnostic sonography and medical imaging services in the Kamothe node.

Kamothe is a spacious node, as it is evenly divided into 48 sectors and has some great infrastructure facilities. It is experiencing rapid growth, with a substantial rise in the population in the past five years But it has been facing various issues related to light outages

== Transportation ==
Kamothe falls in Raigad district and is maintained by the Panvel Municipal Corporation and CIDCO.

Kamothe has two railway stations Mansarovar and Khandeshwar that lie on the harbour line, a part of Mumbai suburban railways.

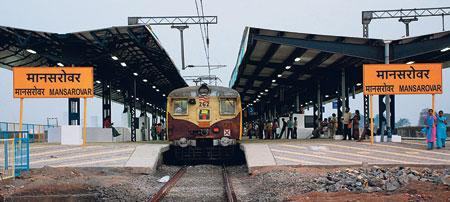
Local train in Mansarovar Railway Station

Auto rickshaws are the primary means of local transportation.

BEST, NMMT and MSRTC/ST buses serve as another means of transportation over a long distance to various nodes. Kamothe postal index number is 410209.

A Metro station has also been planned to be built in Sector 10 of Kamothe by as a part of Navi Mumbai metro phase two which will connect Kamothe directly to the airport and existing line 1 after completion of phase 2

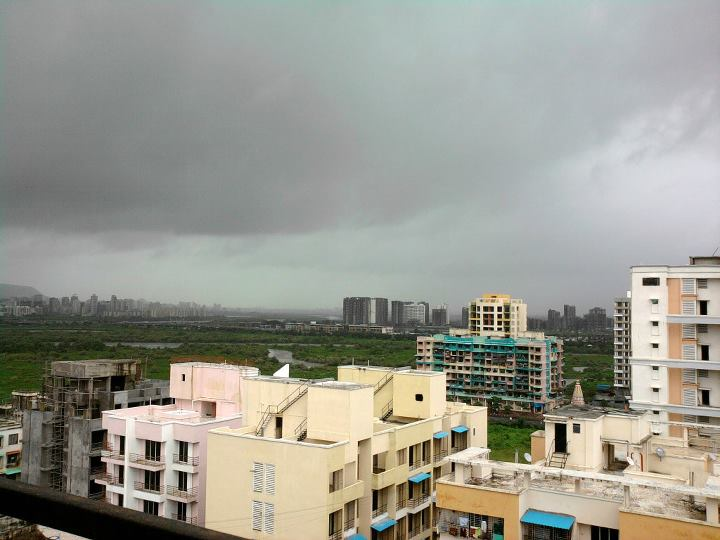
View of Panvel Highway from Kamothe

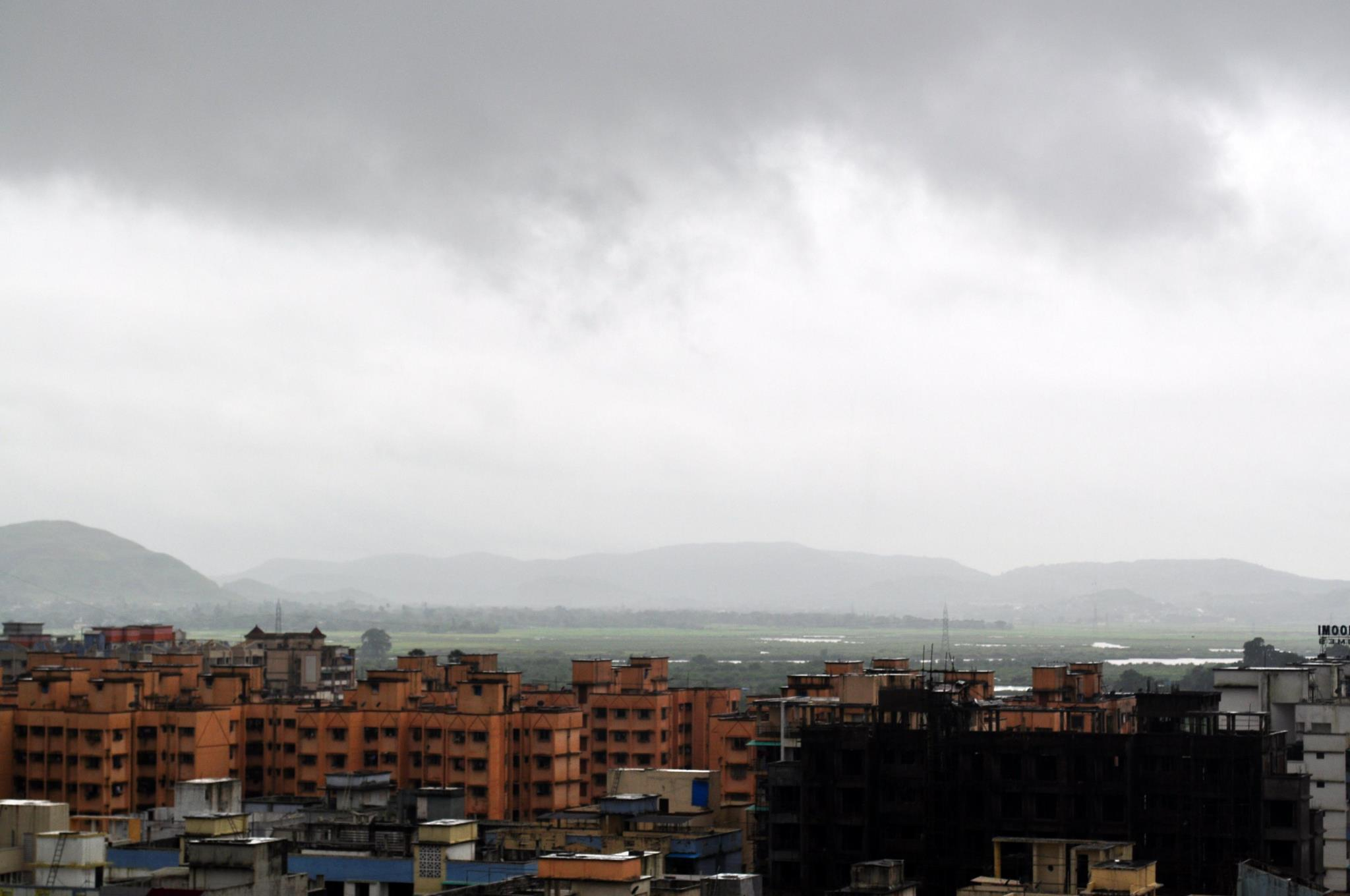
Kamothe- NMIA area from Sector 35

== Schools and colleges ==
- MNR school of excellence
- Loknete Ramsheth Thakur English Medium School and Jr. College
- St. Agrasen High School & Jr. College
- Shankarrao Chavan Vidyalay School and Junior College
- Sushma Patil Vidyalaya and Junior College
- S.S.H. Jr. College
- H.B.P SHRI. DAMAJI GANPAT GOWARI VIDYALAYA & JUNIOR COLLEGE
- S.S.V Shree Suvidya Vidyalaya School
- Z.P.School
- Dattushet Patil School
- Loknete Ramsheth Thakur Public School - CBSE
- MGM College of Engineering and Technology
- MGM School of Biomedical Sciences
- MGM Medical College and Hospital
- M.U.M ENGLISH SCHOOL
- S S Bhagat New English School
- Indo Scots Global School
- Maji Amdar Dattusheth Patil Vidyalay
- New English School

|
