= Navi Mumbai Municipal Transport =

Transport wing of the Navi Mumbai Municipal Corporation

- Parent: Navi Mumbai Municipal Corporation
- Founded: 23 January 1996
- Headquarters: CBD Belapur, Navi Mumbai
- Locale: Navi Mumbai
- Service area: Navi Mumbai; Thane-Purna; Mumbai; Kharghar-Taloja; Panvel-New Panvel-Kalamboli-Kamothe; Karjat-Khopoli-Rasayani; Ulwe-Uran; Kalyan-Dombivli-Badlapur
- Service type: Local, low floor, air-conditioned (AC) and Non-AC bus services
- Routes: 77+
- Depots: 3 (additional 1 is proposed)
- Fleet: 534 (452 operational)
- Daily ridership: 300,000
- Fuel type: CNG, Diesel, and Electric
- Operator: Navi Mumbai Municipal Transport Undertaking
- Transport Manager: Mr. Yogesh Kaduskar
- Website: NMMT – NMMC

Navi Mumbai Municipal Transport (N.M.M.T.) is the transport wing of Navi Mumbai Municipal Corporation, which operates bus services in Navi Mumbai.

NMMT was established on 23 January 1996 with 25 buses in its fleet. It has been awarded the `SKOCH Award – 2023’ by SKOCH Group recently

== Navi Mumbai Municipal Transport (N.M.M.T.) Bus Routes ==
2 AC	Airoli Sector 10 to Thane Rly Stn (W) / Cidco
2 AC	Thane Rly Stn (W) / Cidco to Purna Via Kalher
3 AC	Kopar Khairane Bus Stn to Thane Rly Stn (W) / Cidco Via Patni
4 AC	Vashi Sector 07 to Thane Rly Stn (W) / Cidco
7 AC	Vashi Rly Stn to Thane Rly Stn (W) / Cidco
8 AC	Vashi Rly Stn to Thane Rly Stn (W) / Cidco Via Ghansoli Village
9	Vashi Rly Stn to Ghansoli Depot
10	Sanpada Rly Stn to Ghansoli Gharonda Via APMC Market
11 AC	Sanpada Rly Stn to Thane Rly Stn (W) / Cidco Via MIDC
14 AC	Nerul Sector 50 to DY Patil College (Nerul LP)
15 AC	Nerul Sector 46/48 to DY Patil College (Nerul LP)
17 AC	Nerul Rly Stn (E) to Kharkopar Rly Stn (Ulwe)
18 AC	Ghansoli Depot to Kharkopar Rly Stn (Ulwe) Via Nerul (W)
20 AC	Ghansoli Depot to Nerul Sector 46/48
21 AC	Vashi Sector 07 to Artist Colony (CBD) Via Nerul (E)
22 AC	Vashi Sector 07 to Kharghar CISF Via Nerul (W)
23 AC	Artist Colony (CBD) to Kharkopar Rly Stn (Ulwe)
24 AC	Panvel Rly Stn (W) to Thane Rly Stn (W) / Cidco
30 AC	Roadpali (Kalamboli) to Uran (Pensioner Park)
31	Kopar Khairane Bus Stn to Uran (Pensioner Park)
41 AC	Vashi Bus Stn to Dombivli Rly Stn (W) Via Turbhe Naka
42	Vashi Rly Stn to Dombivli Rly Stn (W) Via APMC Market / Kopar Khairane
43 AC	Kharghar Rly Stn to Taloja Phase 2 Via Gharkul
44 AC	Belapur Rly Stn to Dombivli Rly Stn (W) Via Turbhe Naka
45 AC	Kharghar Rly Stn to Taloja Phase 2 Via Utsav Chowk
46 AC	Vashi Rly Stn to Badlapur Fire Brigade Via Turbhe Naka
47 AC	NMMC Office (Belapur) to Badlapur Fire Brigade Via Taloja MIDC
48	Belapur Rly Stn to Vashivali Village (Rasayani)
49	Belapur Rly Stn to Karjat Fire Brigade
50	Ghansoli Depot to Panvel Rly Stn (W)
52 AC	Belapur Rly Stn to Ghot Village Via Kharghar / Taloja
53 AC	Kharghar Rly Stn to Shilp Valley Sector 36 Via Gharkul
54	Kharghar Rly Stn to RAF Colony Via Jalvayu
55	Ghansoli Depot to Taloja Phase 1 Via Kharghar
56 AC	Mansarovar Rly Stn to CP Office (Roadpali) Via Kalamboli
58	Belapur Rly Stn to Khopoli Village
59	Khandeshwar Rly Stn to Panvel Rly Stn (E) Via Khanda Colony
60 AC	Vashi Rly Stn to Kalyan Rly Stn (W) Via Turbhe Naka
61 AC	Belapur Rly Stn to Kalyan Rly Stn (W) Via Turbhe Naka
62 AC	Vashi Rly Stn to Kalyan Rly Stn (W) Via Kopar Khairane
64	Digha Village to Kalyan Rly Stn (W) Via Airoli
65 AC	Patni to Kalyan Rly Stn (W) Via Airoli / MIDC
66	Ghansoli Rly Stn (E) to Kalyan Rly Stn (W)
71	Belapur Rly Stn to Kalyan Rly Stn (W) Via Taloja MIDC
73	Panvel Rly Stn (W) to Kalyan Rly Stn (W) Via Taloja MIDC
75	Panvel Rly Stn (W) to Sai Nagar
76	Panvel Rly Stn (W) to Karanjade
77	Panvel Rly Stn (E) to Mahalaxmi Nagar (Nere Village)
81 AC	Vashi Bus Stn to Mumbra Rly Stn Via Turbhe Naka
82	Sanpada Rly Stn to Diva Rly Stn (E) Via Turbhe Naka
83 AC	Airoli Bus Stn to Thane (Cidco) Via Patni
84 AC	Vashi Bus Stn to Mumbra Rly Stn Via Kopar Khairane
86 AC	Thane (Cidco) to Diva Rly Sun (E) Via Kalwa / Mumbra
106 AC	Panvel Rly Stn (W) to World Trade Centre Via Freeway
107 AC	CBD Belapur Bus Stn to World Trade Centre Via Freeway
108 AC	Nerul Sector 46/48 to World Trade Centre Via Freeway
109 AC	Digha Village to Nahur Rly Stn (E) Via Patni
110 AC	Kharghar CISF to World Trade Centre Via Freeway
114 AC	Ghansoli Gharonda to World Trade Centre Via Freeway
115 AC	Kharkopar Rly Stn (Ulwe) to World Trade Centre Via Freeway
116 AC	Nerul Rly Stn (E) to World Trade Centre Via Atal Setu
117 AC	Kharghar CISF to World Trade Centre Via Atal Setu
125 AC	Kharghar CISF to Borivali Rly Stn (E)
144	Airoli Bus Stn to Andheri Rly Stn (E)
A-1 AC	Kharkopar Rly Stn (Ulwe) to Navi Mumbai Airport
A-2 AC	Nerul Rly Stn (E) to Navi Mumbai Airport
A-3 AC	Belapur Rly Stn to Navi Mumbai Airport
A-4 AC	Khandeshwar Rly Stn to Navi Mumbai Airport
A-5 AC	Panvel Rly Stn to Navi Mumbai Airport
