= Rohinjan =

Village in Maharashtra

Rohinjan kiravali
- village
- Location in Maharashtra, India
- Coordinates: 19°05′13″N 73°04′30″E
- Country: India
- State: Maharashtra
- District: Raigad

Government
  - Type: Panvel municipal corporation
  - Body: CIDCO

Languages
  - Official: Marathi
- Time zone: UTC+5:30 (IST)
- Postal code: 410208
- Vehicle registration: MH-46

Rohinjan is a village situated in Taloja, under panvel municipal corporation Navi mumbai acquired by (CIDCO) on old mumbai pune highway Rohinjan- kiravali is situated near Kharghar it has metro and railway station at 1.5 to 2.5 km (0.93 to 1.55 mi) distance, is now a major attraction for new building projects. This area also has the tallest tower Adhiraj samyama of Navi Mumbai Raigad district in Maharashtra, India.
