= Sion Panvel Highway =

Motorway in Maharashtra

Sion Panvel Expressway
- Sion-Panvel Highway marked in red on Greater Mumbai area map

Route information
- Maintained by Maharashtra State Road Development Corporation; Maharashtra Public Works Department; Municipal Corporation of Greater Mumbai
- Length: 25 km (16 mi)

Major junctions
- West end: Sion, Mumbai
- East end: Mumbai Pune Expressway at Kalamboli junction near Panvel

Location
- Country: India
- States: Maharashtra
- Districts: Mumbai Suburban district, Raigad district, Thane district
- Major cities: Mumbai, Navi Mumbai, Panvel

Highway system
- Roads in India; Expressways; National; State; Asian

The Sion-Panvel Expressway is a 25 km Indian highway located entirely in the state of Maharashtra that connects Sion in Mumbai with Panvel, via Navi Mumbai. It is one of the busiest and most important roads in the Mumbai Metropolitan Region (MMR) and connects Mumbai with the city of Pune. The National Highway 4 and he Mumbai-Pune Expressway begin at the eastern end of the expressway, at the Kalamboli junction, near Panvel. The highway is also used by vehicles traveling towards Mumbai from the Konkan and Goa.

As of September 2014, the stretch of the highway east of Vashi Bridge within the city of Navi Mumbai has been fully widened and concretized to 10 lanes (5 lanes in each direction). New flyovers have been built at Sanpada railway station, Nerul, Uran, and Kamothe. A toll plaza built between Kamothe and Kharghar for recovering the construction cost was controversially opened on January 6, 2015, after much delay as the BJP-led Maharashtra state government admitted that it was not in a position to abolish the toll. Heavy traffic snarls were reported in the initial days as workers of Maharashtra Navnirman Sena vandalized the toll booths. One-way toll for motor vehicles has been set at ₹ 40 for cars & ₹ 130 for Trucks & Buses.

== Major connections ==
The following major highways cross the Sion Panvel Highway:

- Mumbai-Pune Expressway and National Highway 4 at Kalamboli junction
- Thane–Belapur road at Turbhe
- Palm Beach Marg at Vashi
- Mankhurd-Ghatkopar link road at Mankhurd
- Eastern Express Highway at Sion

== Important destinations ==
Sion Panvel Highway serves the following nodes of the city of Navi Mumbai.

- Vashi
- New Panvel
- Sanpada
- Panvel
- Turbhe
- Nerul
- CBD Belapur
- Kharghar
- Kamothe
- Kalamboli

Sion Panvel Highway serves the following nodes of the city of Mumbai.

- Ghatkopar
- Chembur
- Deonar
- Mankhurd
- Bhabha Atomic Research Centre

== Intersections ==
Sion-Panvel Highway intersects following important roads.

- Palm Beach Marg
- Thane Belapur Road
- National Highway 48
- V. N. Purav Marg
- Eastern Express Highway
- Eastern Freeway
- Ghatkopar-Mankhurd Link Road
- Amra Marg

== Widening and Concretization ==
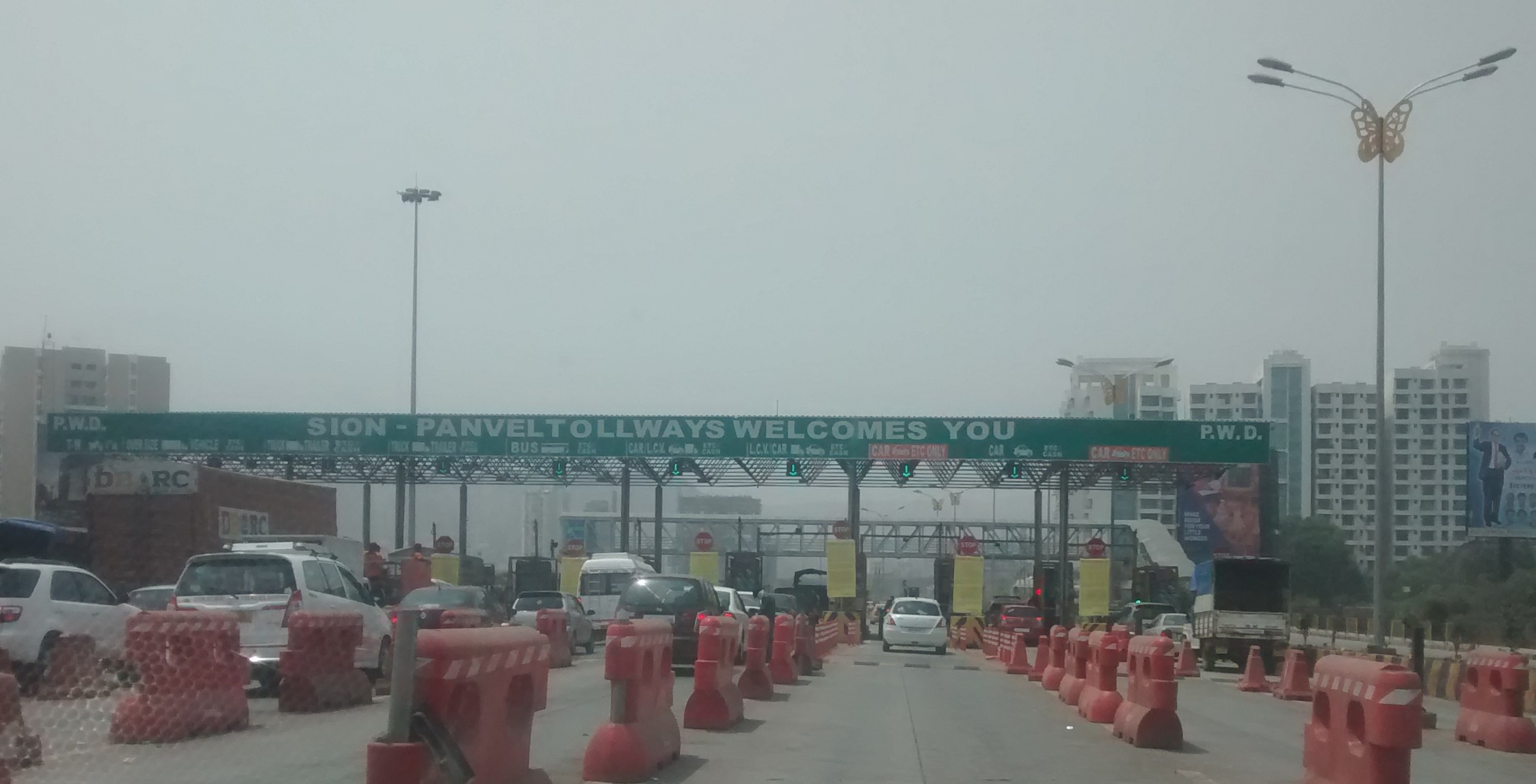
Toll Plaza at Taloja

- The stretch of road from the BARC Junction to the Kalamboli Junction is about 25 kilometres in length.
- Total Project cost is Rs. 825 Crore (Based on the DSR of 2006–2007).
- The base Construction cost is Rs. 675 crores.

The project consists of:

1. Widening of the existing bituminous road to 5+5 lanes with concrete pavements.
2. The central 3+3 lanes to be access controlled.
3. The Service roads to be provided whenever required for about 6.29 kilometres.
4. Provision of a signal-free passage for through traffic.
5. 3 new Flyovers at Kamothe Junction, Sanpada Junction, and Uran Junction.
6. Duplication of flyovers at Taloja and Chembur-Mankhurd Link Road junction.
7. Pedestrian crossing Underpasses at 10 locations.
8. Foot over Bridges at 3 locations.
9. Geometric Junction improvements as per standards.
10. Toll plaza at Vashi to be upgraded to 8+8 lanes, Toll fee at prescribed rates (current rate) and Toll period to be quoted by BOT Contractor.
11. Landscaping / Beautification of entire project corridor including Median plantation, Road side plantation, Landscaping and Beautification below flyovers.
12. Renovation / upgradation of existing flyovers, structures.
13. Electrification of entire project corridor.
14. Operation and Maintenance of Project Facilities up to the end of toll period quoted by BOT Contractor.

== Gallery ==
Aerial view of a fully concretized 10-lane stretch near Kharghar railway station.

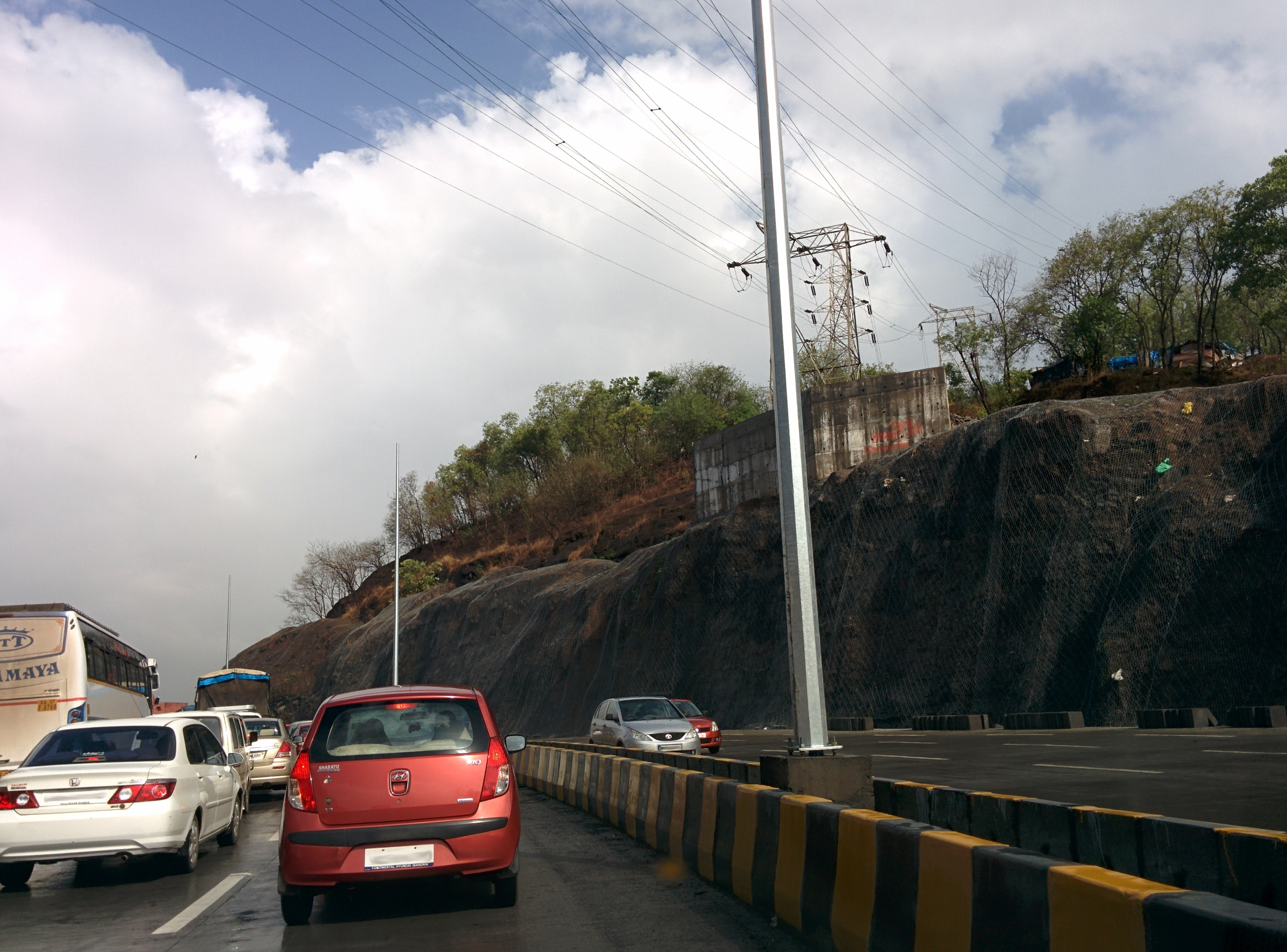
Rockfall protection meshing between Nerul and CBD Belapur.

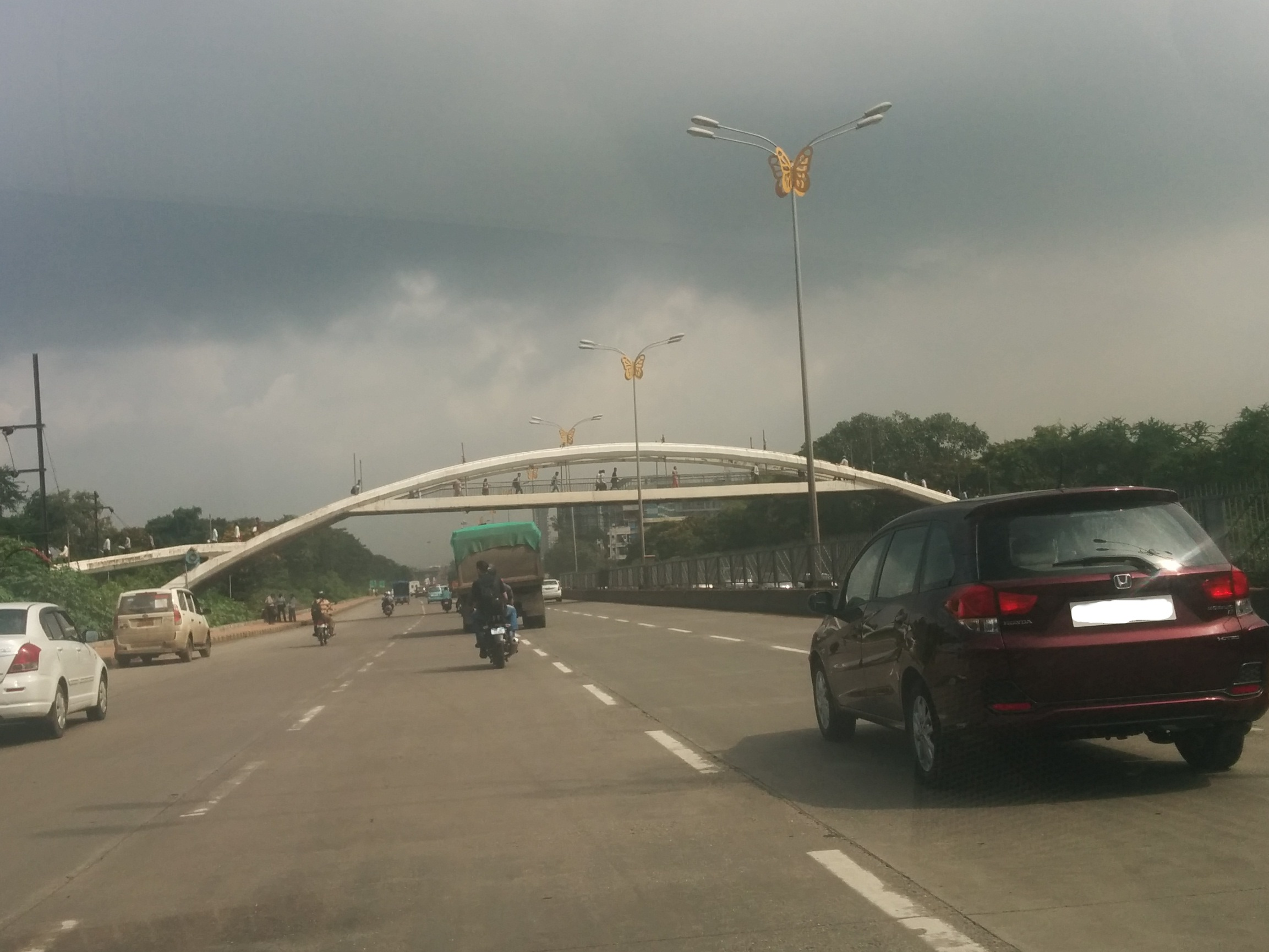
Footbridge near Juinagar railway station.

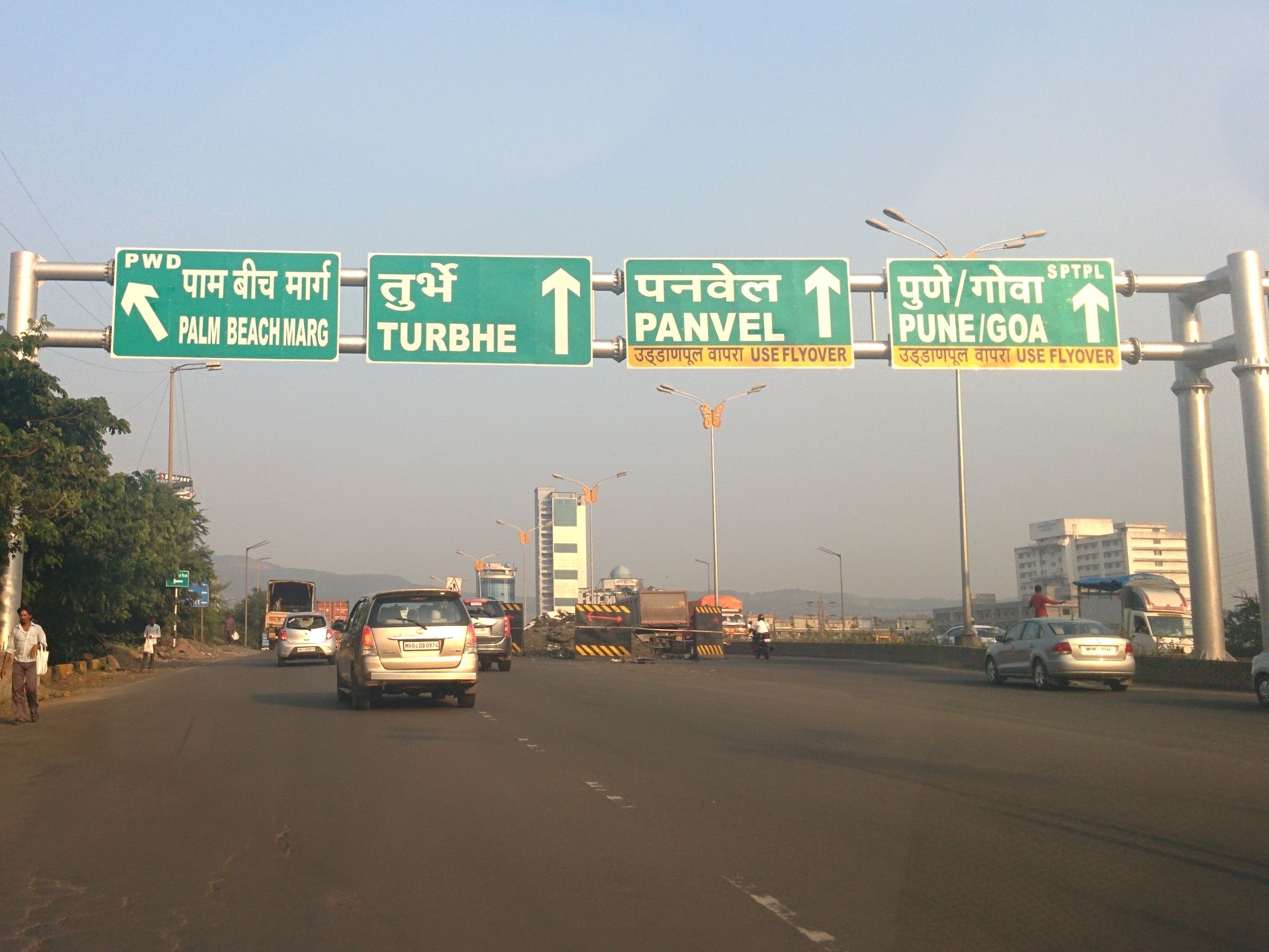
Exit sign for Palm Beach Marg at Vashi.

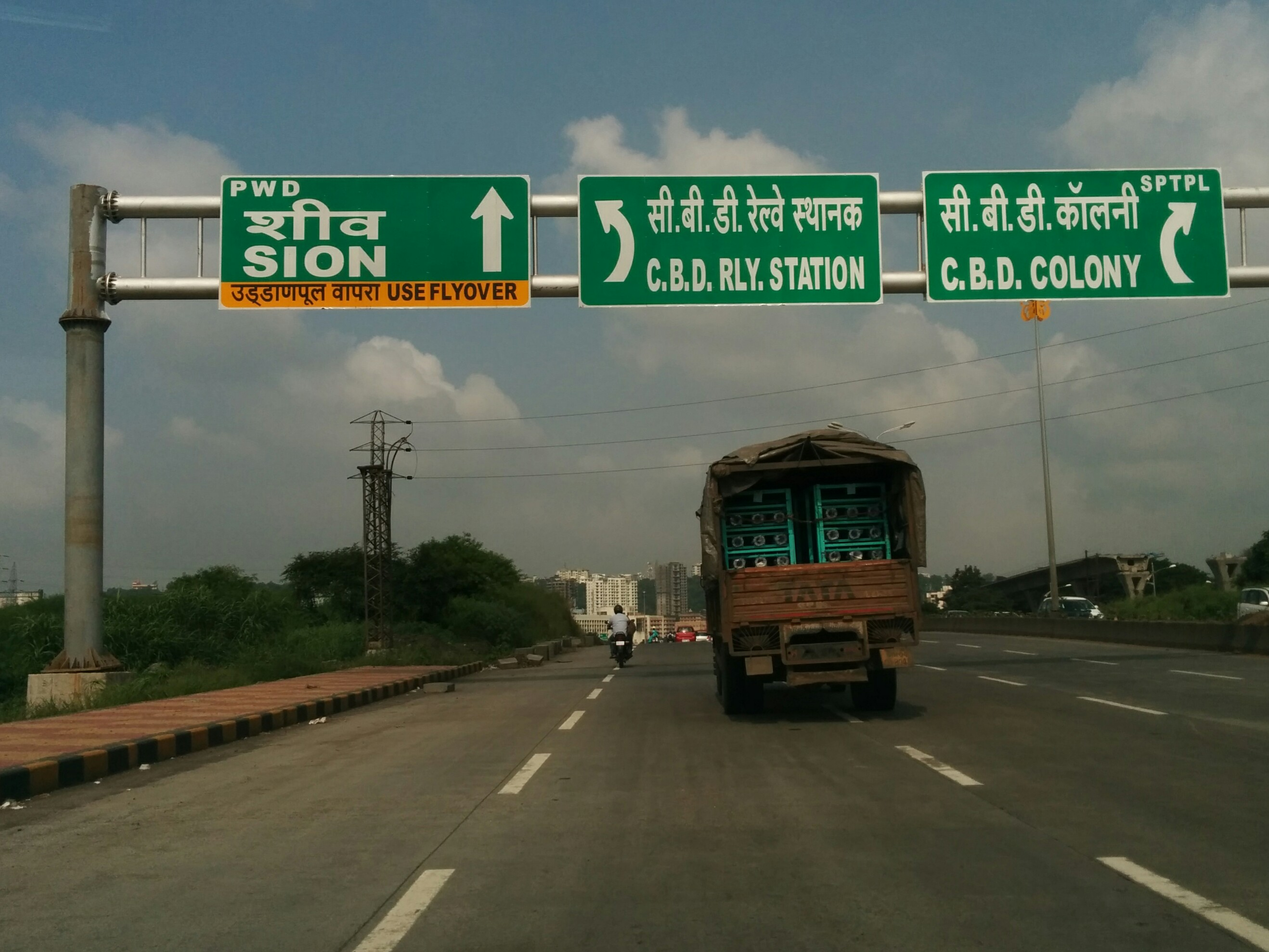
Exit sign for CBD Belapur.

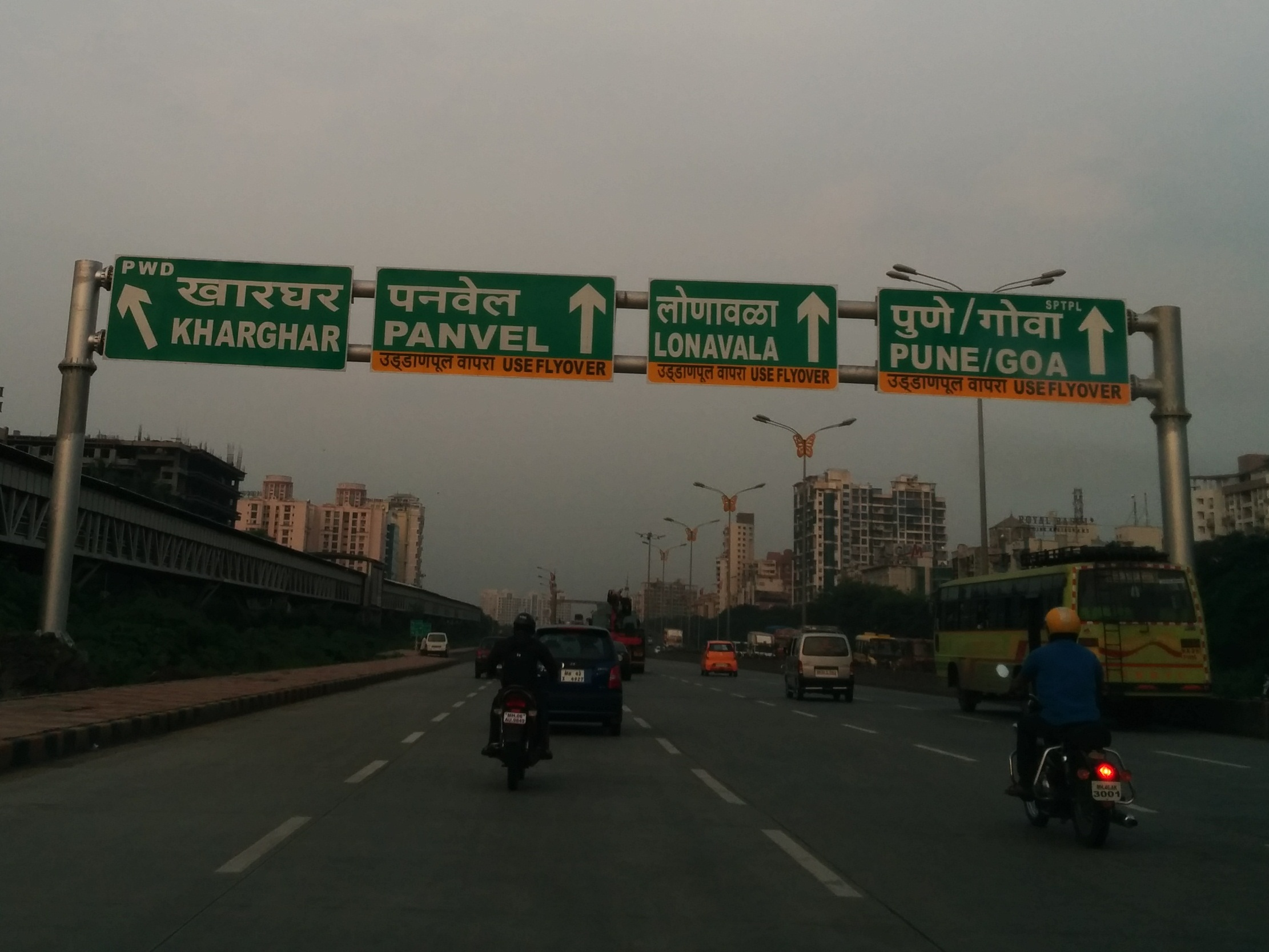
Exit sign for Kharghar.
