= Panvel Municipal Corporation =

Local civic body in Panvel, Maharashtra, India

Type
- Type: Municipal Corporation

History
- Established: October 2016; 10 years ago
- Preceded by: Panvel Municipal Council

Leadership
- Mayor: Nitin Patil, BJP
- Municipal Commissioner: Shri. Mangesh Sharmila Pandurang Chitale
- Deputy Mayor: Pramila Patil
- Opposition Leader: Vacant

Structure
- Seats: 78
- Political groups: Government (55): BJP (55); Opposition (23): PWPI (9); SS(UBT) (5); INC (4); SHS (2); NCP (2); IND (1)

Elections
- Last election: 15 January 2026
- Next election: 2031

Website
- https://www.panvelcorporation.com

Municipal Corporation of The City of Panvel is the governing body of the city of Panvel and 29 revenue villages including Taloje Pachnand, Kharghar, Kamothe in Raigad district in Navi Mumbai. Panvel Municipal Corporation is headed by Mayor of city and governed by Commissioner. Panvel Municipal Corporation has been formed with functions to improve the infrastructure of town.

In 2016 Maharashtra State cabinet decided to elevate Panvel Municipal Council to Municipal Corporation under Maharashtra Regional and Town Planning Act, 1966.

The mismanagement of the Panvel Municipal Corporation has led to illegal encroachments in many municipal areas, such as New Township Navde near NH4, Kharghar near D-Mart, and the area near Panvel bus depot.

The Municipal Corporation does not have its own transportation system and is entirely dependent on Navi Mumbai Municipal Transport (NMMT). The internal roads in nodal areas, such as Kopar, Navde, and Taloja, are currently in poor condition.

The city is lagging behind due to poor infrastructure, including an inadequate transportation system, deteriorating roads, sewage problems, and water supply issues. Despite these challenges, the authorities are allocating a massive sum of ₹280 crore for the construction of the municipal corporation building and ₹17 crore for the Mayor’s residence.

Following the formation of Panvel Municipal Corporation, CIDCO ceased to function as New Town Development Authority for the area in villages Kalundre, Devichapada, Kamothe, Chal, Tondhare, Kalmboli, Khidukpada, Pale Khurd, Asudgaon (pt), Tembhode (pt), Walvali (pt), Padghe (pt) and Roadpali (pt), and Panvel Municipal Corporation became the planning authority for the same. However CIDCO continues to be the New Town Development Authority for Kharghar, Taloje Pachnand, Owe, Navde and Pendhar.

== List of Mayor ==
| # | Name | Term | | | Election | Party |
|---|---|---|---|---|---|---|
| 1 | Kavitha Chautmal | 10 July 2017 | 8 July 2022 | 4 years, 363 days | 2017 | Bharatiya Janata Party |
| 2 | Nitin Patil | 6 February 2026 | Incumbent | 285 days | 2026 | Bharatiya Janata Party |

== History ==
Panvel Municipal Council was formed on August 25, 1852 as the first municipal council in the country. The First President of Panvel Municipality is Mr.Yusuf Noor Muhammad Master, The initial notification for converting Panvel Municipal Council to Municipal Corporation came in the year 1991 but was never finalised. After rapid urbanisation post-2000, Panvel Municipal Council was eventually upgraded to Municipal Corporation in 2016.

Panvel Municipal Corporation is the first Municipal Corporation in Raigad district, 9th in the Mumbai Metropolitan Region and 27th in the state of Maharashtra. The Municipal Corporation includes 29 revenue villages of Panvel taluka including CIDCO colonies of Taloja, Kharghar, Kalamboli, Kamothe, New Panvel covering area of 110 km^{2}.

The Government of Maharashtra through its Urban Development Department's notification dated 14 October 2016 has added 11 more villages (namely: Bid, Adivali, Rohinjan, Dhansar, Pisarve, Turbhe, Karvale Budruk, Nagzeri, Taloje Majkur, Ghot and Koynavele) of Panvel Taluka to the Panvel Municipal Corporation. Earlier these 11 villages were part of MMRDA's sanctioned development plan of "AKBSNA"(Ambernath Kulgaon Badlapur Surrounding Notified Area).

== Revenue sources ==
The total budget for the year 2024-25 was 3991.9 crores. The following are the Income sources for the Corporation from the Central and State Government.

=== Revenue from taxes ===
Following is the Tax related revenue for the corporation.

- Property tax.
- Profession tax.
- Entertainment tax.
- Grants from Central and State Government like Goods and Services Tax.
- Advertisement tax.

=== Revenue from non-tax sources ===
Following is the Non Tax related revenue for the corporation.

- Water usage charges.
- Fees from Documentation services.
- Rent received from municipal property.
- Funds from municipal bonds.

== Corporation election ==
=== Political performance in election 2026 ===
Panvel Municipal Corporation elections were conducted on 15 January 2026.

2026 results
| Parties | Number of Corporators |
|---|---|
| Bharatiya Janata Party (BJP) | 55 |
| Peasants and Workers Party of India | 9 |
| Shiv Sena (SHS) | 2 |
| Nationalist Congress Party – Sharadchandra Pawar (NCP-SP) | 0 |
| Indian National Congress (INC) | 4 |
| Shiv Sena (UBT) | 5 |
| Nationalist Congress Party (NCP) | 2 |
| Independents | 1 |

=== Political performance in election 2017 ===
Panvel Municipal Corporation elections were conducted on 24 May 2017.

2017 results
| Parties | Number of Corporators |
|---|---|
| Bhartiya Janata Party (BJP+RPI) | 51 |
| Peasants and Workers Party of India (PWP) | 23 |
| Indian National Congress (INC) | 2 |
| Nationalist Congress Party (NCP) | 2 |
| Shiv Sena (SS) | 0 |
| Independents | 0 |

== Administration ==
The Municipal Corporation is headed by Shri. Mangesh Sharmila Pandurang Chitale, who holds the post of Municipal Commissioner-cum-Administrator in the absence of an elected legislature. The municipal commissioner is supported by additional officers. No elections have been conducted after the term of previous corporators came to and end on July 9, 2022 and due to COVID induced lockdowns elections were delayed.

City Representatives
| Mayor | Nitin Patil |
| Deputy Mayor | Pramila Patil |
| Municipal Commissioner & Administrator | Shri. Mangesh Sharmila Pandurang Chitale |
| Leader of the House | Nitin Patil |
| Leader of Opposition | Vacant |

Administrative Officers
| Commissioner And Administrator | Shri. Mangesh Sharmila Pandurang Chitale |
| Additional Commissioner-I | Dr. Shri. Prashant Dattatray Rasal |
| Additional Commissioner-II | Shri. Bharat Prabhakar Rathod |
| Deputy Transport Manager | Shri. Abhishek Ravikiran Paradkar |
| Deputy Commissioner (Headquarters) | Shri. Kailas Balu Gavade |
| Deputy Commissioner | Dr. Vaibhav Kailas Vidhate |
| Deputy Commissioner | Shri. Maruti Gaikwad |
| Deputy Commissioner | Shri. Babasaheb Rajale |
| Deputy Commissioner | Shri. Santosh Chandrabhaga Suresh Varule |
| Chief Accounts and Finance Officer | Shri. Mangesh Namdev Gavade |
| Chief Auditor | Shri. Nilesh Murlidhar Nalawade |
| City Engineer | Shri. Sanjay Katekar |
| Assistant Director Town Planning | Smt. Jyoti Surendra Kavade |
| Medical Health Officer | Dr. Anand Dadasaheb Gosavi |
| Auditor | Shri. Sandeep Vidyadhar Khurpe |
| Accounts Officer | Shri. Sangram Tulashidas Vhorakate |
| Assistant Commissioner | Shri. Swaroop Manik Kharage |
| Deputy Engineer (Water Supply) | Shri. Vilas Rajaram Chavan |
| Chief Fire Officer (Additional Charge) | Shri. Parvin Balu Bodakhe |
| Town Planner | Shri. Keshav Jagannath Shinde |
| Planning Assistant | Shri. Vitthal Baburao Dhaygude |
| Assistant Town Planner | Shri. Ranjit Netaji Kore |
| Education Officer | Shri. Ramesh Chavhan |
| Planning Assistant | Shri. Aniket Arun Durgavale |
| Assistant Law Officer | Shri Sagar Rahul Ahiwale |
| Junior Security Officer | Shri. Siddhesh Kailas Tawari |

=== List of Commissioner's ===
1. Ganesh Deshmukh

== See also ==
- Panvel
- Navi Mumbai
- Raigad district
