= Afcom Holdings =

Indian cargo airline

IATA	ICAO	Call sign
O9	—	—
- Founded: 2013; 13 years ago
- Hubs: Chennai International Airport
- Fleet size: 3
- Destinations: 5
- Key people: Deepak Parasuraman (founder)
- Website: afcomcargo.com

Afcom Holdings is a cargo airline based out of Chennai, India. The airline received the Air operator's certificate from the Directorate General of Civil Aviation in December 2024.

== History ==
Afcom Holdings was established in 2013 by Captain Deepak Parasuraman. It received clearance from the Ministry of Civil Aviation to operate a cargo airline in 2017. It went for a IPO and was listed in the Bombay Stock Exchange in August 2024. It received the Air operator's certificate from the Directorate General of Civil Aviation in December 2024. It landed its first aircraft at the Chennai International Airport in late December 2024, and is expected to regular scheduled operations in early 2025.

== Destinations ==
Destinations
Country	City	Airport	Notes	Ref.
India	Chennai	Chennai International Airport	Hub	
India	Delhi	Indira Gandhi International Airport		
India	Navi Mumbai	Navi Mumbai International Airport		
Maldives	Malé	Velana International Airport		
Sri Lanka	Colombo	Bandaranaike International Airport		
Thailand	Bangkok	Suvarnabhumi International Airport		
United Arab Emirates	Dubai	Al Maktoum International Airport		

== Fleet ==
As of July 2026, Afcom operates the following aircraft:

Afcom fleet
Aircraft	In service	Orders	Passenger	Notes
Boeing 737-800BCF	2			

=== Former fleet ===
As of January 2025, Afcom operated two leased Boeing 737-800BCF freighter aircraft.
