= Taloje Panchnand =

Taloja Panchnand तळोजे पंचनंद
- Node
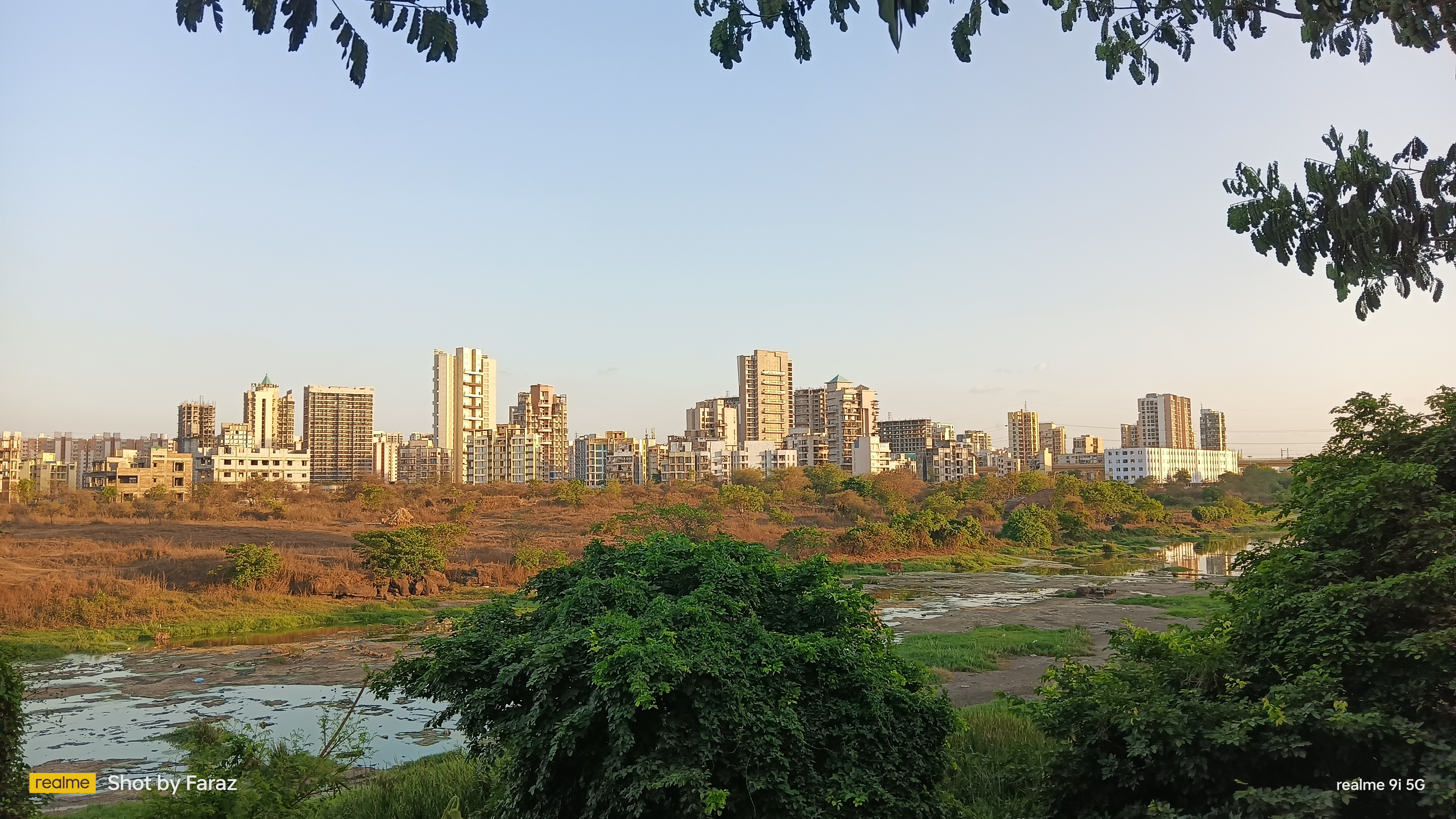
- View of Taloja city from Taloje River
- Interactive map of Taloja Panchnand
- Coordinates: 19.0833°N 73.0833°E
- Country: India
- State: Maharashtra
- District: Raigad
- City: Navi Mumbai
- Taluka: Panvel
- Founder: CIDCO

Government
  - Type: Municipal Corporation
  - Body: Panvel Municipal Corporation

Population (2011)
  - Total: 14,318

Languages
  - Official: Marathi
- Time zone: UTC+5:30 (IST)
- Postal code: 410208
- Vehicle registration: MH-46 (Navi Mumbai's Raigad district)

Taloja is a node of Navi Mumbai in the Raigad district, in the Western India of Maharashtra. It is an extension of the Kharghar node and governed by the Panvel Municipal Corporation. The Navi Mumbai Metro Phase I originates from the Pendhar station in Taloja. CIDCO has divided Taloja into Phase I and Phase II. It has developed a mass housing project in Phase II, and development work is currently in progress. The node is connected to parts of Navi Mumbai through Indian Railways, Navi Mumbai Metro, and NMMT buses and will eventually be served by the Navi Mumbai International Airport.

== Demographics ==
As of 2001 India census, Taloje Panchnand had a population of 10,858. Males constitute 54% of the population and females 46%. Taloje Panchnand has an average literacy rate of 68%, higher than the national average of 59.5%: male literacy is 73%, and female literacy is 61%. In Taloje Panchnand, 18% of the population is under 6 years of age.

== See also ==
- Taloja Panchnand railway station
- Taloja Central Jail
