= Jeejabai Bhosle Marg =

Road in eastern Mumbai

Jeejabai Bhosle Marg Ghatkopar-Mankhurd Link Road (GMLR) Mankhurd-Ghatkopar Link Road (MGLR)

Route information
- Maintained by Brihanmumbai Municipal Corporation
- Length: 4 km (2.5 mi)
- Existed: 2007–present

Major junctions
- West end: Ghatkopar
- East end: Mankhurd

Location
- Country: India
- States: Maharashtra
- Major cities: Mumbai

Highway system
- Roads in India; Expressways; National; State; Asian

Jeejabai Bhosle Marg, the official name of the Ghatkopar-Mankhurd Link Road (GMLR) or the Mankhurd-Ghatkopar Link Road (MGLR), is a road in eastern Mumbai connecting the suburbs of Mankhurd and Ghatkopar. It connects to the Mumbai-Pune Expressway via the Sion Panvel Highway. The road is 4 km long and 200 feet wide. Construction on its main carriageway started in 2005 and it was opened in 2007.

== BRTS ==
On 7 September 2012, BEST announced that it would implement a bus rapid transit system (BRTS) with dedicated lanes on the GMLR. Under the project, the GMLR will be widened to 60m and concretised. The project will cost ₹2,070.3 million (US$21 million). Existing service roads on each side of the artery will be converted into additional drive lanes, expanding the road to four lanes in each direction. The slip lane will be reserved for BEST buses.

Underneath reinforced concrete road, the BMC will construct lines for electricity, gas, water and telephone. A reinforced concrete wall will be constructed at culverts and bridges after encroachments are removed, so that the embankment of the road and the new reinforced concrete box cell of utility services are protected. There will also be 2 pedestrian bridges at Bainganwadi Junction and Shivaji Nagar Junction.

Following the opening of the Eastern Freeway in 2013, traffic from Dr Babasaheb Ambedkar Road is shared with the former, and merges with the GMLR near RBK School. GMLR also helps ease traffic on the Sion Panvel Highway.

== See also ==
- Ghatkopar
- Mankhurd
