= Utsav Chowk =

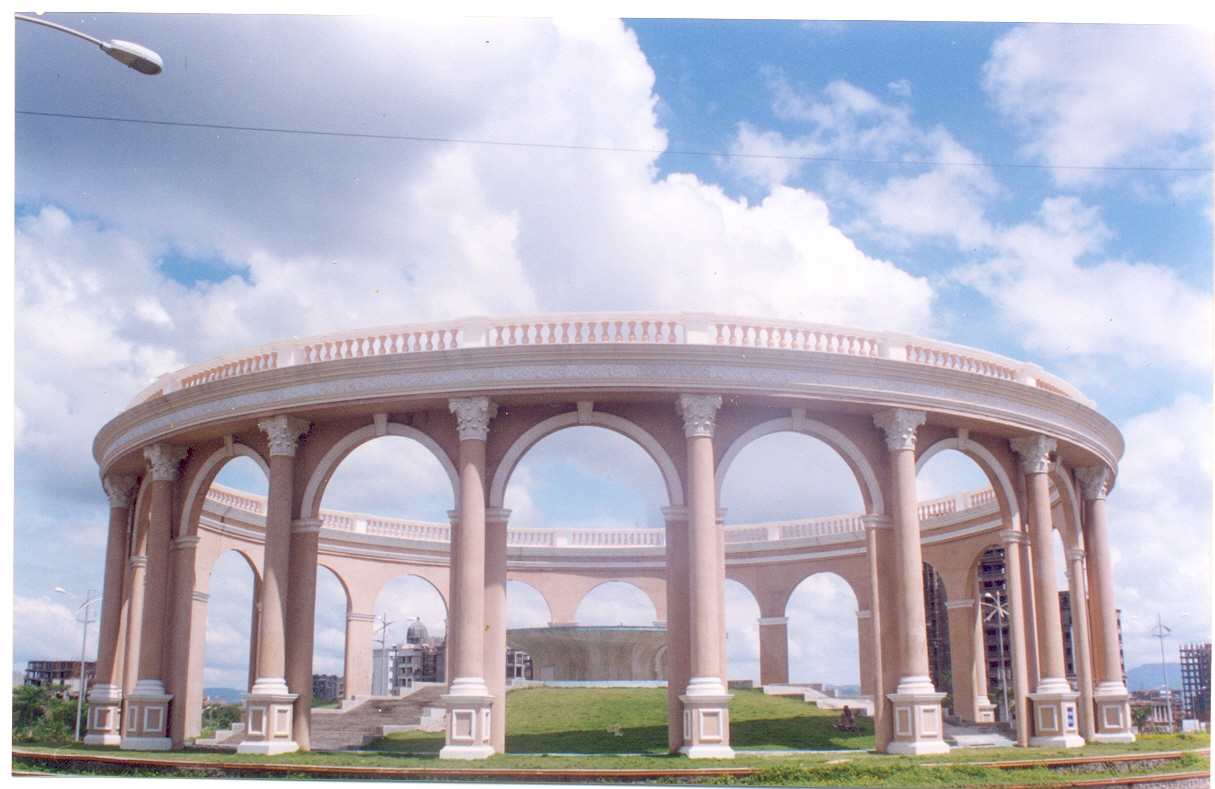

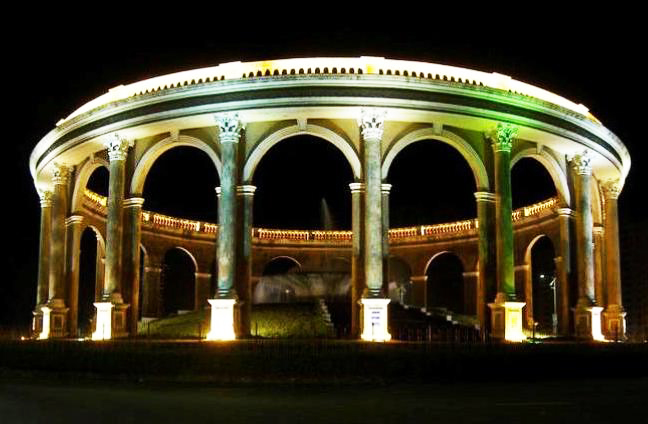
Utsav Chowk at Kharghar

Utsav Chowk is one of the famous landmarks of Kharghar, Navi Mumbai, in the Indian state of Maharashtra. Kharghar is one of the towns in Raigad district of Navi Mumbai area. It is a well planned town and Utsav Chowk is a prominent landmark just between Sector-4, Sector-7 and Sector-5 of Kharghar town.

Utsav Chowk stands out for its eye catching architecture which is a humble reflection of the Roman and Greek architecture. Earlier Utsav Chowk was known for the eateries that came up in the evening here and people enjoyed different types of snacks and food here but due to issues related to upkeep of this area they were removed from here. Utsav Chowk is at the crossing of raintree road and pravesh marg (entry road) in Kharghar. Near this crossing there is one hospital known as Motherhood Hospital.

The Belapur-Kharghar-Taloja Metro line which is under construction passes just near of the Utsav Chowk, expected to open by 2022

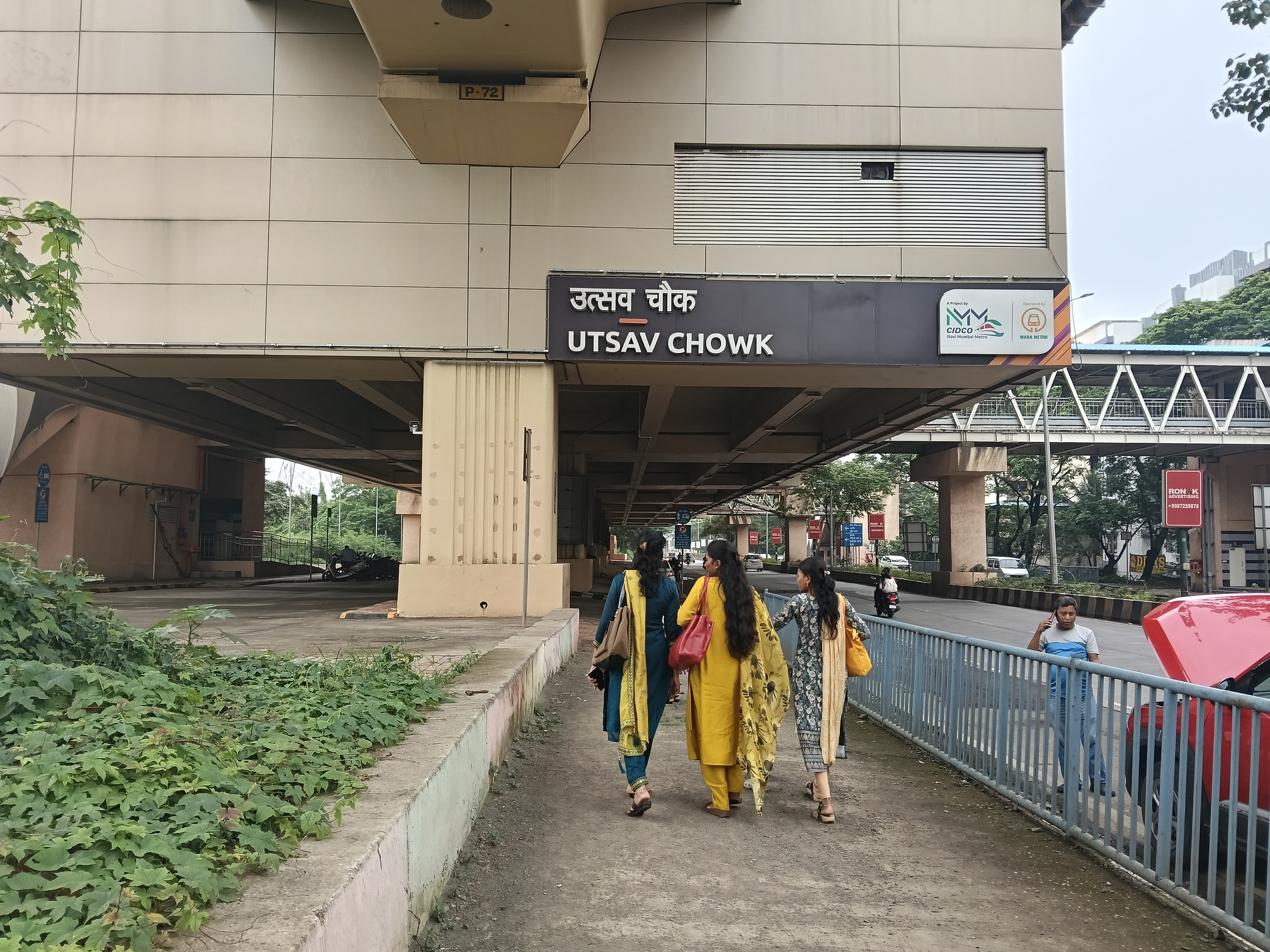
View of Utsav Chowk Metro Station
