= Navi Mumbai International Airport =

International airport in Maharashtra, India

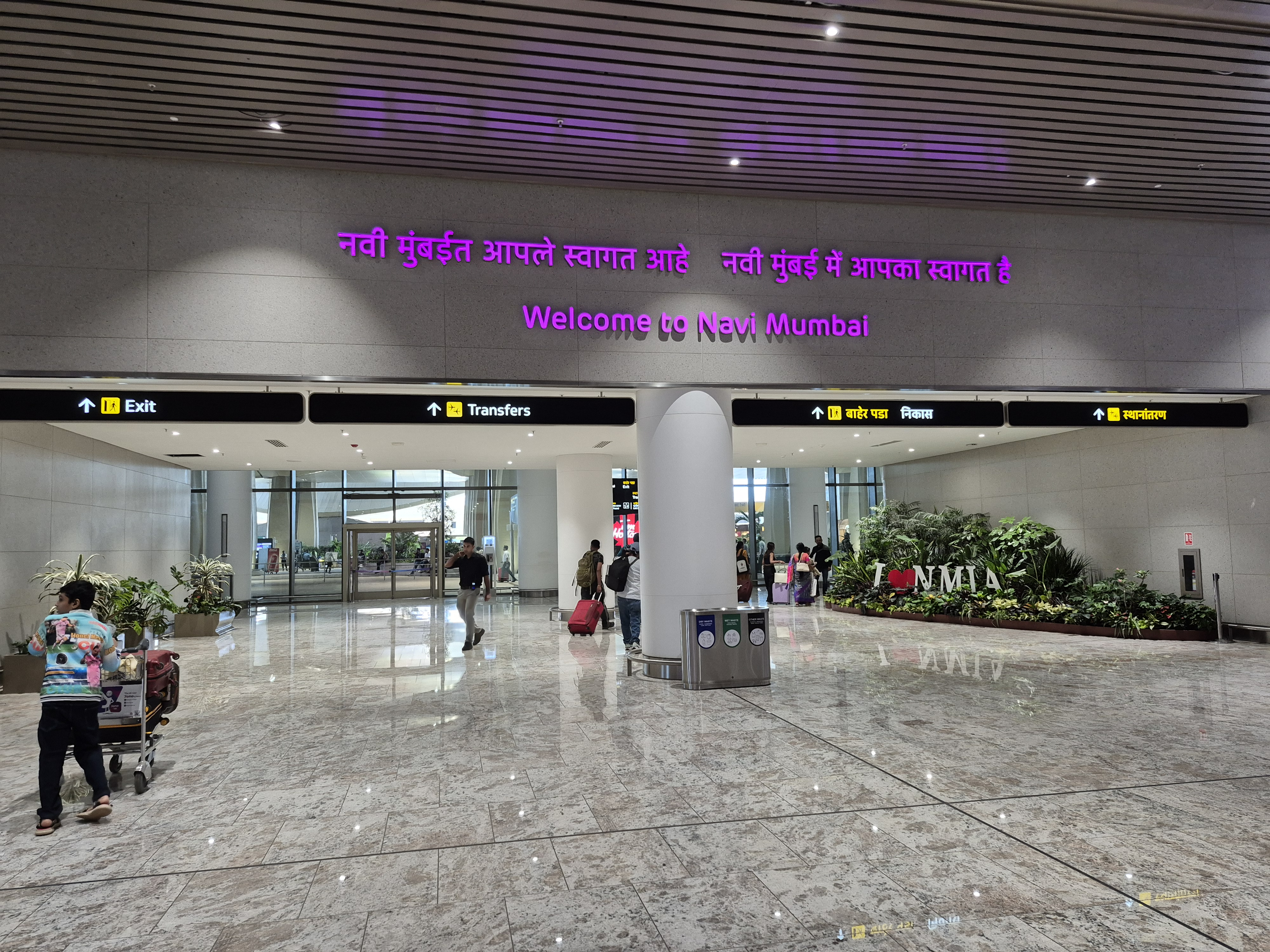
- IATA: NMI; ICAO: VANM

Summary
- Airport type: Public
- Owner: City and Industrial Development Corporation (CIDCO) (26%) Mumbai International Airport Limited (MIAL) (74%)
- Operator: Navi Mumbai International Airport Limited (NMIAL)
- Serves: Mumbai Metropolitan Region
- Location: Ulwe, Navi Mumbai, Raigad district, Maharashtra, India
- Opened: 25 December 2025; 10 months ago
- Elevation AMSL: 8 m (26 ft)
- Coordinates: 18°59′31″N 073°03′42″E
- Website: navimumbai.adaniairports.com

Map
- Location of airport in Mumbai Metropolitan Region NMI/VANM (Maharashtra) NMI/VANM (India)

Runways
Direction	Length		Surface
Direction	m	ft	Surface
08/26	3,700	12,140	Asphalt

Statistics (April 2025 – March 2026)
- Passengers: 638,394 (▲ -%)
- Aircraft movements: 4,510 (▲ -%)
- Cargo tonnage: 560.8 (▲ -%)
- Source: AAI

Navi Mumbai International Airport (IATA: NMI, ICAO: VANM) is an international airport in Navi Mumbai, Maharashtra, India. Located in the Ulwe suburb in Raigad district, it is one of two airports in the Mumbai Metropolitan Region, alongside the Chhatrapati Shivaji Maharaj International Airport.

Plans for a new airport in the Mumbai metropolitan region was first proposed in November 1997. The Navi Mumbai airport was approved by the Indian government in 2007, and City and Industrial Development Corporation (CIDCO) was appointed by the state government as the nodal agency for implementing the project. The project, estimated to cost ₹167 billion (US$1.8 billion), was planned to be implemented in three phases, with a capacity to handle 90 million passengers and 2.5 million tonnes of cargo per annum by 2032.

GVK Group-led Mumbai International Airport Limited was awarded the project in 2017. After delays due to land acquisition issues, the ground breaking ceremony was held in February 2018. In 2021, Navi Mumbai International Airport Limited, a special-purpose vehicle was established between Adani Airport Holdings and CIDCO for the management of the project. Following pre-developmental work, the construction of the airport started in August 2021, and the construction was carried out by Larsen & Toubro. It was inaugurated on 8 October 2025 by prime minister Narendra Modi, with commercial operations commencing on 25 December 2025.

The airport is equipped with a single 3,700 m (12,100 ft) long runway oriented in a northeast – southwest direction. After the first phase, the airport's single passenger terminal has a capacity to handle 20 million passengers per annum. The terminal buildings feature a lotus-shaped design, which will be complete once the three interconnected terminals are constructed in phases. The cargo terminal, spread over 33,000 m^{2} (360,000 sq ft) is equipped to handle 0.8 million tonnes of cargo in a year.

== History ==
=== Proposal ===
In November 1997, the City and Industrial Development Corporation (CIDCO) proposed the construction of a new airport at Navi Mumbai with a single runway. Subsequently, the Ministry of Civil Aviation constituted a committee to examine the possibility of a second airport in the Mumbai Metropolitan Area to operate alongside the Chhatrapati Shivaji Maharaj International Airport. The committee examined various locations in the Mumbai region, and proposed a site at Mandwa–Rewas for the new airport. The Navi Mumbai location was deemed suitable only for a domestic airport, due to a single runway. Later, CIDCO revised its plan to incorporate two parallel runways. The airport site was located in an area of 9.5 km^{2} (3.7 sq mi) parcel of land along the National Highway 348 near Panvel, about 35 km (22 mi) from the existing airport. About 2,900 ha (7,200 acres) of coastal land was required for the project, with 1,320 ha (3,300 acres) for the airport and 245 ha (610 acres) to be developed as a mangrove park.

In August 2007, the Union cabinet of the Indian government gave approval for the construction of a new greenfield airport at Navi Mumbai in a public-private partnership model. In January 2008, Rail India Technical and Economic Service was tasked with preparing the master plan of the airport. On 30 July 2008, the Maharashtra government appointed CIDCO as the nodal agency for implementing the project. The project was planned to be implemented in three phases, with the first phase establishing an operational capacity to handle 20 million passengers per annum, which would be enlarged to handle 60-65 million in the second phase, and 90 million passengers and 2.5 million tonnes of cargo per annum by the third phase in 2032. The airport was planned to have a terminal area of 250,000 m^{2} (2,700,000 sq ft) and a cargo area of 100,000 m^{2} (1,100,000 sq ft).

=== Planning and development ===
The project received clearance from the Ministry of Defence by the end of 2010, and the Ministry of Environment, Forest and Climate Change cleared the project on 23 November 2010. IIT Bombay was appointed to conduct an environment impact assessment and Central Water and Power Research Station was tasked with the study of the hydrological impact of the airport on the surrounding water bodies. The total project is estimated to cost ₹167 billion (US$1.8 billion), with the cost for the first two phases was estimated to be ₹95 billion (US$1.0 billion). The pre-development work was estimated to cost ₹23.58 billion (US$250 million), including ₹15.38 billion (US$160 million) for land acquisition and ₹8 billion (US$85 million) for other works.

CIDCO invited global tenders for the project in February 2014. The agency received nine bids and shortlisted four bidders, which was forwarded to the Project Management Committee for further scrutiny. After multiple extension of the deadlines, GVK Group and GMR Group submitted final bids for the first two phases. On 13 February 2017, the GVK-led Mumbai International Airport Limited (MIAL) was announced as the winning bidder. GVK offered CIDCO a 12.6% share in revenue, as compared to the 10.44% offered by the GMR Group. While the government cleared the project in April 2017, land acquisition began only in June due to opposition from the locals. The project required the relocation of 2,786 households located across ten villages, who were compensated with ₹1,500 (US$16) per sq ft of the land, rent for 18 months, and a developed plot of land of a size equal to triple the roof area in an alternate locality. Work was stalled again in October 2017 due to protests, before resuming a week later.

=== Construction and opening ===
On 18 February 2018, the Indian prime minister Narendra Modi unveiled the foundation plaque at the ground breaking ceremony for the airport. In March 2018, London-based Zaha Hadid Architects was appointed to design the airport's passenger terminal and Air Traffic Control tower, after a 12-week design competition. CIDCO floated a tender to select the engineering, procurement, and construction contractor for the project in August 2018. Based on hydrological studies conducted of the Ulwe River catchment area, it was recommended to cut a channel to divert the Ulwe River into the Moha Creek. Subsequently, CIDCO completed pre-development work on the Ulwe River diversion by June 2019. Other work included flattening the Ulwe Hill, reclaiming marsh land, raising the level of the project site by 5.5 m (18 ft), and shifting power transmission lines.

In September 2019, GVK awarded a contract for construction of the airport to Larsen & Toubro. The Adani Group took over the management of the airport project in 2021, and Navi Mumbai International Airport Limited (NMIAL), a special-purpose vehicle was established between Adani Airport Holdings and CIDCO for the purpose. The construction began in August that year. While initial land acquisition for the core area had been completed in 2019, the entire project land was handed over only in July 2022 after resettlement measures. By November 2023, Adani reported that 57% of the work for first phase has been completed. On 8 October 2025, Modi inaugurated the first phase of the airport for public operations.

The airport started commercial operations on 25 December 2025. The first scheduled commercial arrival was an IndiGo flight from Bengaluru, which landed at 8 am and departure was an Indigo flight to Hyderabad at 8:40 am, both operated by the same aircraft. Dedicated freighter operations from the Cargo terminal at NMIA began on 1 August 2026 with an IndiGo Cargo freighter departing to Sharjah.

== Facilities ==
The airport covers an area of 1,160 ha (4.5 sq mi).

=== Runways ===
The airport has a single 3,700 m (12,100 ft) long runway 08/26 oriented in a northeast – southwest direction. It is equipped with a category II Instrument Landing System with a three-degree glide angle, enabling landings at visibility levels up to 300 m (980 ft). The airport will eventually have two parallel runways enabling simultaneous operations. In 2025, CIDCO initiated a process to appoint a consultant for techno-feasibility study for a third runway at the airport.

=== Terminals ===
The passenger terminal has a capacity to handle 20 million passengers per annum. The terminal buildings feature a lotus-shaped design, which will be complete once the three interconnected terminals are constructed in phases. Once complete, the airport will have a handling capacity of 90 million passengers. The airport is equipped with food courts, lounges, travellators, and other facilities for passengers.

The airport is planned to have 67 general aviation aircraft stands, including a separate heliport. Private and charter aircraft operations would be moved from the existing airport to here by the end of 2025.

==== Cargo Terminal ====
The Air Cargo Complex is located on the east side of the airfield. It began domestic operations on 25 December 2025. Dedicated freighter operations began on 1 August 2026. It has seven dedicated freighter parking stands, with expansion planned to 11 in the final phase. The domestic cargo terminal is spread over 33,000 m^{2} (360,000 sq ft) and the international cargo terminal occupies 23,700 m^{2} (255,000 sq ft). After the first phase, the airport has a capacity to handle 0.8 million tonnes of cargo in a year. NMIA is targeting an eventual cargo handling capacity of 3.2 million metric tonnes annually. FedEx is developing a 300,000 sq. ft. fully automated air cargo hub at NMIA.

=== Other facilities ===
The airport has a 151,000 m^{2} (1,630,000 sq ft) fuel farm and three aircraft hangars. A temporary air traffic control tower has been built, overlooking the single runway. The tower is expected to be in service for six to seven years, after which it will be replaced by a larger tower, to be built near the terminal buildings, to provide coverage to the planned two parallel runways.

== Airlines and destinations ==
=== Passenger ===
Airlines	Destinations
Air India Express	Abu Dhabi, Bengaluru, Bhopal, Delhi–Indira Gandhi, Hyderabad, Indore
Akasa Air	Ahmedabad, Bengaluru, Delhi–Indira Gandhi, Goa–Mopa, Kochi, Kolkata Lucknow, Noida, Varanasi
Fly91	Agatti, Goa–Mopa, Jalgaon, Sindhudurg
IndiGo	Agra, Ahmedabad, Aurangabad, Ayodhya, Bareilly, Belgaum, Bengaluru, Bhavnagar, Bhopal, Chandigarh, Chennai, Coimbatore, Darbhanga, Dehradun, Delhi–Indira Gandhi, Diu, Ghaziabad, Goa–Dabolim, Goa–Mopa, Gorakhpur, Hubli, Hyderabad, Indore, Jabalpur, Jaipur, Jammu, Jamnagar, Jharsuguda, Kannur, Kochi, Kolhapur, Kolkata, Lucknow, Madurai, Mangaluru, Nagpur, Noida, Patna, Raipur, Rajkot, Srinagar, Siliguri, Thiruvananthapuram, Tirupati, Udaipur, Vadodara, Varanasi, Visakhapatnam

=== Cargo ===
Airlines	Destinations
AeroLogic	Frankfurt
Afcom Cargo	Dubai–Al Maktoum
ASL Airlines Belgium	Hong Kong, Liège
Astral Aviation	Nairobi-Jomo Kenyatta
Atlas Air	Liège
Cathay Cargo	Hong Kong, London-Heathrow
Challenge Airlines	Chicago/Rockford, Liège
Hong Kong Air Cargo	Hong Kong
IndiGo CarGo	Sharjah
JDL Airlines	Chongqing
Lufthansa Cargo	Frankfurt
Maximus Air	Charter: Abu Dhabi, Dammam
MNG Airlines	Charter: Hong Kong, Sharjah
National Airlines	Charter: Hahn
Qatar Airways Cargo	Doha
SF Airlines	Chengdu-Shuangliu
Sichuan Airlines Cargo	Chengdu-Tianfu
Silk Way West Airlines	Baku
Suparna Airlines Cargo	Nanjing, Shanghai-Pudong
Turkish Cargo	Istanbul

== Statistics ==
Operations and statistics
Year	Passengers	Aircraft
2025-26	6,38,394	4,510

== Connectivity ==
The airport is connected via the National Highway 348 which abuts the eastern boundary of the airport, and Aamra Marg that runs along the western boundary. CIDCO will construct two six-lane roads along the coast to improve connectivity to the airport. The Ulwe coastal road will connect the Mumbai Trans Harbour Link to the airport while the Kharghar coastal road will connect the Kharghar to CBD Belapur via the airport. Both projects are expected to be completed by early 2026.

The airport will be connected with Navi Mumbai Metro Line 1 and the future Gold Line (Line 8) of the Mumbai Metro, which has been approved by the government. The airport has an interchange with the Port Line of the Mumbai Suburban Railway at the Targhar Railway station. The airport is also planned to be the terminal station of the proposed Mumbai–Hyderabad high-speed rail corridor.

== See also ==
- Juhu Aerodrome
- List of airports in India
