= Kalundre =

- Census town
- Location in Maharashtra, India
- Coordinates: 18.9833°N 73.1333°E
- Country: India
- State: Maharashtra
- District: Raigad

Population (2001)
  - Total: 7,581

Languages
  - Official: Marathi
- Time zone: UTC+5:30 (IST)

Kalundre is a census town in Raigad district in the Indian state of Maharashtra.

== Demographics ==
As of 2001 India census, Kalundre had a population of 7581. Males constitute 52% of the population and females 48%. Kalundre has an average literacy rate of 80%, higher than the national average of 59.5%: male literacy is 83%, and female literacy is 76%. In Kalundre, 14% of the population is under 6 years of age. Here is the Kalundre's best all-rounder Pravin Gharat
