= Kalamboli =

- Node
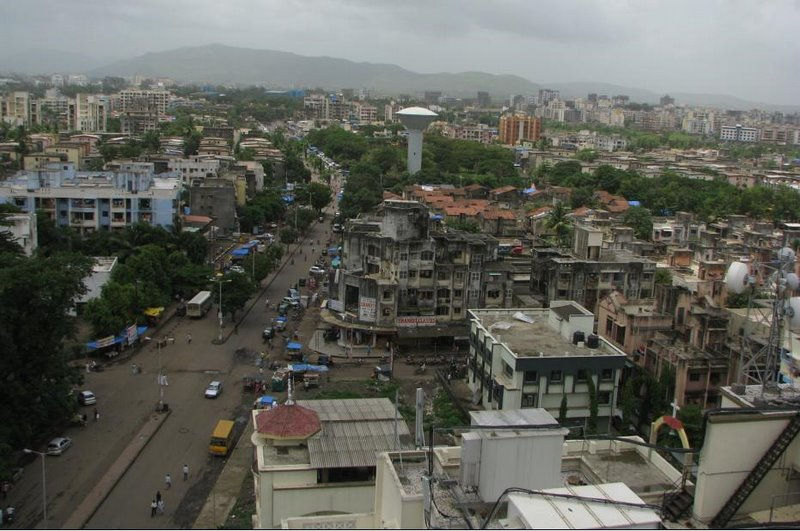
- Skyline of Kalamboli
- Interactive map of Kalamboli
- Coordinates: 19.03333°N 73.1°E
- Country: India
- State: Maharashtra
- City: Navi Mumbai
- District: Raigad
- Taluka: Panvel
- Founder: CIDCO

Government
  - Type: Municipal Corporation Special Planning Authority
  - Body: PMC and CIDCO

Area
  - Total: 7.83 km^{2} (3.02 sq mi)
- Elevation: 14.9352 m (49.000 ft)

Population (2020)
  - Total: 177,154
  - Density: 22,600/km^{2} (58,600/sq mi)

Languages
  - Official: Marathi
- Time zone: UTC+5:30 (IST)
- PIN: 410218
- Telephone code: 91-022-2742
- Vehicle registration: MH 46 (Navi Mumbai's Raigad district)
- Post Office: Kalamboli Post Office
- Police Station: Kalamboli Police Station
- Lok Sabha constituency: Maval
- Vidhan Sabha constituency: Panvel

Kalamboli is a node of Navi Mumbai in Raigad District. It is a transportation hub, being situated at the junction of the Sion-Panvel Highway, NH 48, Panvel By-Pass, NH 66 and Mumbai-Pune Expressway and is among the biggest iron and steel delivery centers in India. The node, like the rest of city, is divided into sectors, which are further divided into plots. The residential and commercial areas of Kalamboli are divided by the NH 4 highway. Roadpali, a region to the north of Kalamboli, is developing at a faster rate than the latter with many residential projects coming up due to availability of land. Roadpali is located along the Taloja Link Road. Kalamboli also houses the Navi Mumbai Police Headquarters. CIDCO is the nodal administrative body for Kalamboli node. Kalamboli also has a Sewage Water Treatment Plant owned by CIDCO. Kalamboli is now governed by Panvel Municipal Corporation (PMC).

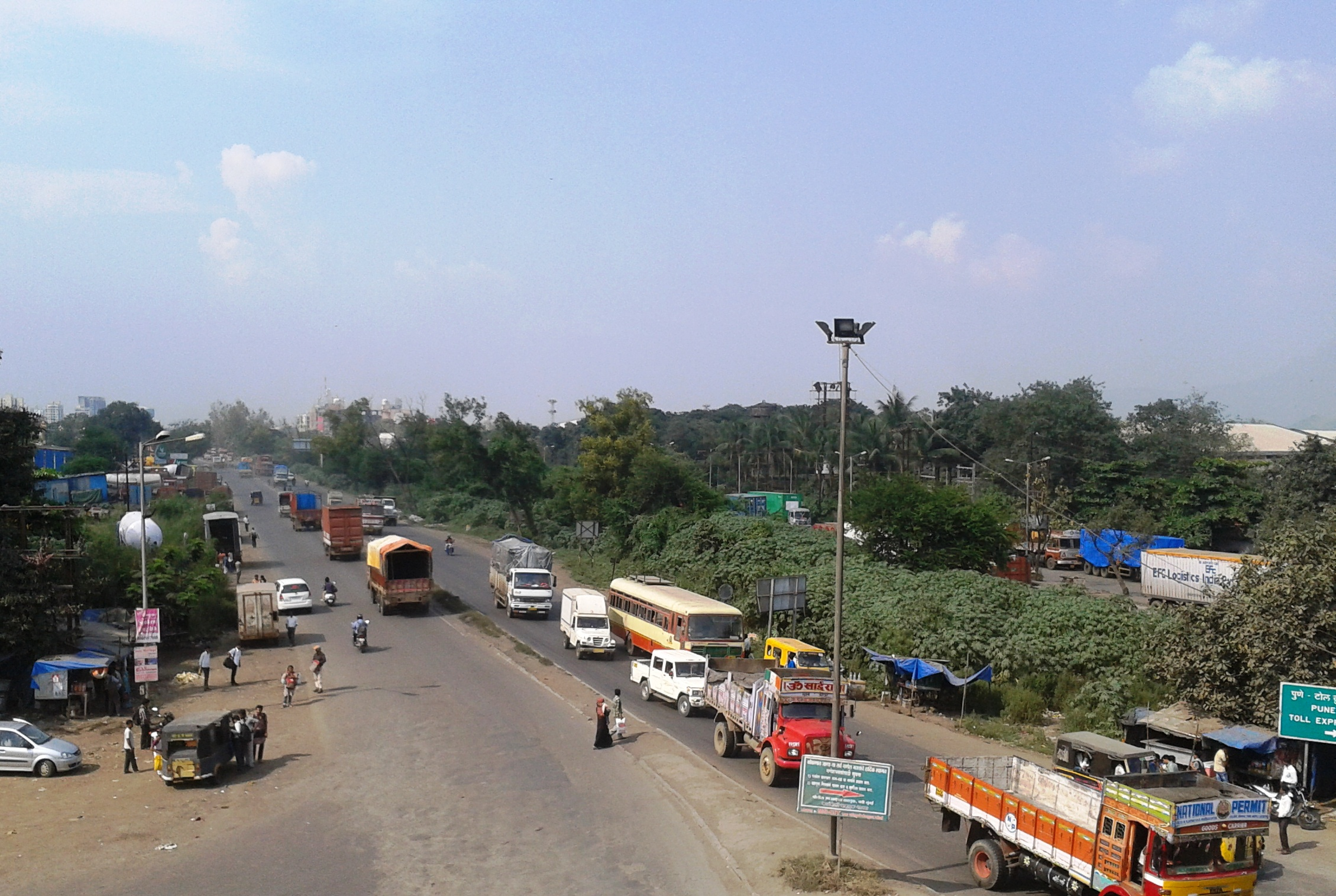
The National Highway - 48 passes through Kalamboli.

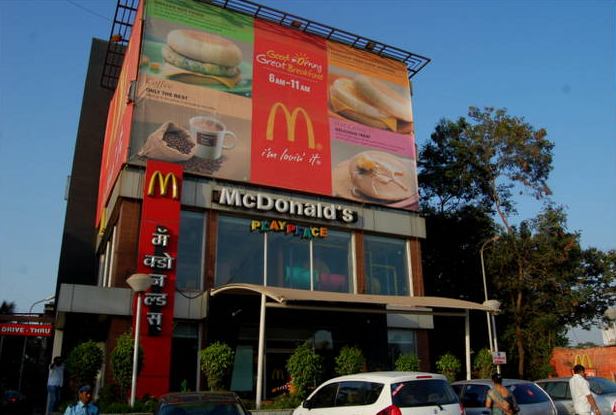
McDonald's outlet in Kalamboli.

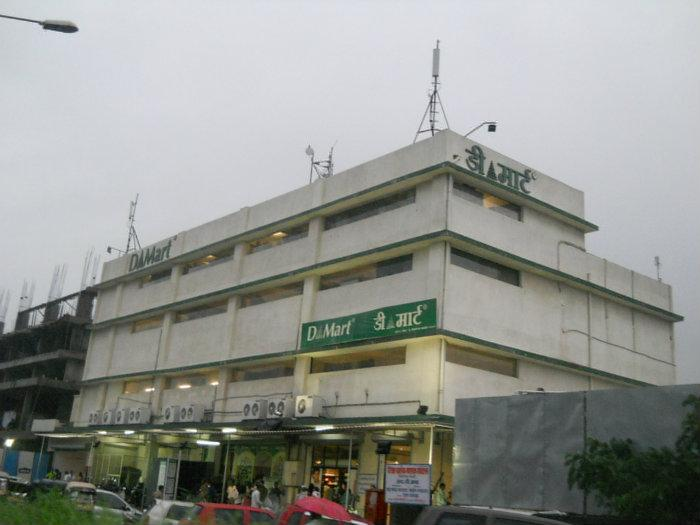
D-Mart outlet in Kalamboli.

== Schools and Colleges ==
- Shikshan Maharshi DadaSaheb Limaye College of Arts Commerce and Science, Kalamboli
- MES Public School
- St. Joseph High School
- KLE College
- Shri Balaji International School
