= Kharghar =

- Node
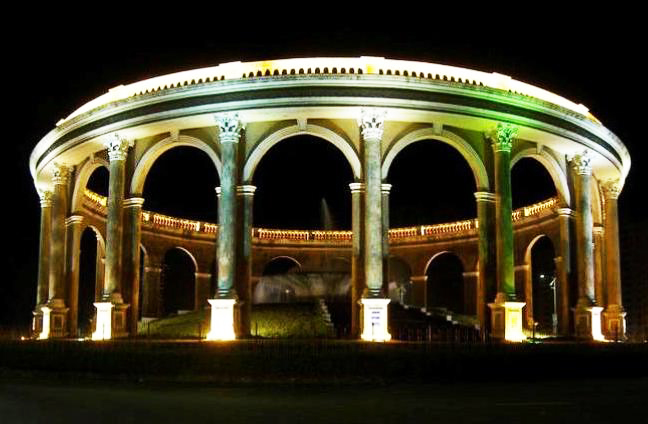
- Utsav Chowk in Kharghar
- Interactive map of Kharghar
- Coordinates: 19.036146°N 73.0617213°E
- Country: India
- State: Maharashtra
- City: Navi Mumbai
- District: Raigad
- Taluka: Panvel
- Founder: CIDCO

Government
  - Type: Municipal Corporation
  - Body: PMC and CIDCO

Area
  - Total: 32 km^{2} (12 sq mi)

Population (2020)
  - Total: 244,472
  - Density: 7,600/km^{2} (20,000/sq mi)
- Time zone: UTC+5:30 (IST)
- PIN: 410210
- Telephone code: 022
- Vehicle registration: MH-46
- Literacy: 98%
- Climate: Monsoon (Köppen)

Kharghar is a node of Navi Mumbai situated in Raigad District and administrative under Panvel Municipal Corporation. Prashant Thakur, MLA, represents Kharghar in the Legislative Assembly as part of the Panvel constituency.

Developed by the City and Industrial Development Corporation (CIDCO), Kharghar has been administered by Panvel Municipal Corporation after its elevation from Municipal Council in 2016. However, CIDCO continues to function as the New Town Development Authority for the region. It's also being developed as the Education Hub of Panvel as many prominent schools and colleges are present and more are planned to follow.

== Transportation ==
=== Navi Mumbai Metro ===
There had been a significant delay in this metro project, and earlier, CIDCO issued a press release stating they were confident of kick-starting the partial services of the Navi Mumbai Metro in December 2021. Further, in October 2021, the Navi Mumbai Metro received an Interim Speed Certificate by the Research, Design, and Standards Organisation (RDSO), based on successful trials, on Line-1, connecting the Central Park metro station to the Pendhar metro station, which stretches 5.14 km between stations 7 and 11. The certification expedited the process of starting commercial runs from the end of December 2021. The Metro commencement was further delayed due to safety certification. The railway board has approved coaches and other operational equipment, post a two-day inspection by the Commissioner of Metro Railway Safety (CMRS) on January 17–18.

The Taloja-Belapur part of the metro has started functioning, and the metro service in this part has commenced from on 17 November 2023.

=== Other modes ===
Kharghar is serviced by the Harbour Line and one can board the train/alight from the train at Kharghar Railway Station. The node is also well serviced by NMMT, BEST and ST buses as it is in Panvel, adjacent to Navi Mumbai, Mumbai and Thane.

== Corporate Park ==
CIDCO has planned a better version of Bandra-Kurla Complex (BKC) in Kharghar with a layered structure with a pyramid-shaped central hub of high rises. The new structure will encompass an area of 200 hectares, factoring in the central park and golf course. The actual corporate hub will be on 125 hectares of land. CIDCO has decided to have a layered structure with the outer fringe to be developed with 1-2 FSI, while the core area will have 3 FSI. Around 50% of the area (120 hectares) has been set aside for the high rises with 3 FSI for the pyramid-shaped structure. Plots will be auctioned for corporates with the richer entities vying for the hub of the corporate park. Shops and commercial properties will also be developed so that there is night life, unlike BKC. Proximity to the Navi Mumbai International Airport and the metro project, worth Rs 13,000 crore, will provide high-class infra, a spokesperson said. The entire Kharghar node, along with nearby industrial and residential Taloja, will get connected to the new airport, lending an opportunity for businesses to hop between work stations and the airport.

== Demography ==
Year	Male	Female	Total Population	Change	Religion (%)							
Year	Male	Female	Total Population	Change	Hinduism	Islam	Christianity	Sikhism	Buddhism	Jainism	Others	Undeclared
2011	42,001	38,611	80,612	-	82.687	5.103	3.034	1.744	5.807	0.944	0.082	0.598

== Site for Central Park ==
The park occupies an area of 119 Ha. (approx.) spreading over into Sectors 23, 24 & 25 in Kharghar. An area of 80 ha. (approx.) is earmarked for 'Central Park'. It is a relatively flat terrain that has sporadic vegetation. The site acts as a link between two natural elements: hill and water. A sprawling hill plateau spread over 250 acres at will soon be up for grabs. The City and Industrial Development Corporation (CIDCO) will hold a global auction with a reserve price of Rs 2,000 crore to create a theme-cum-entertainment city on the lines of Hollywood, Disneyland and Sentosa park in Singapore.

The park has been open to the public since January 2010, and there is no entrance fee for visitors. Since its inauguration, Central Park at Kharghar has been the centre of recreational activities for people in Kharghar as well as other places. For safety, there are four CCTVs at Central Park, which keep a check on the visitors and keep a track of all the people. This move aims at ensuring maximum security for those who visit the park," a senior CIDCO official said.

In 2023, Residents of Kharghar who frequently visited Central Park in Kharghar raised significant concerns about the park's deteriorating condition. They emphasised the urgent need for maintenance and rejuvenation. The park's fencing had been stolen, and the lake within the premises was in dire need of cleaning since it was filled with algae and litter (mostly plastic bottles). In a positive turn of events for residents of Kharghar, CIDCO has taken proactive steps to clean the once-polluted lake at Central Park. This commendable action was prompted by the vigilance of Kharghar Civic, a proactive Twitter account dedicated to addressing local concerns, which brought the matter to CIDCO's attention. By July 2023, the lake was beautifully cleaned. The difference in the lake before and after the clean-up was found remarkable by residents.

== Public Health and Pollution ==
=== The Lung Billboard ===
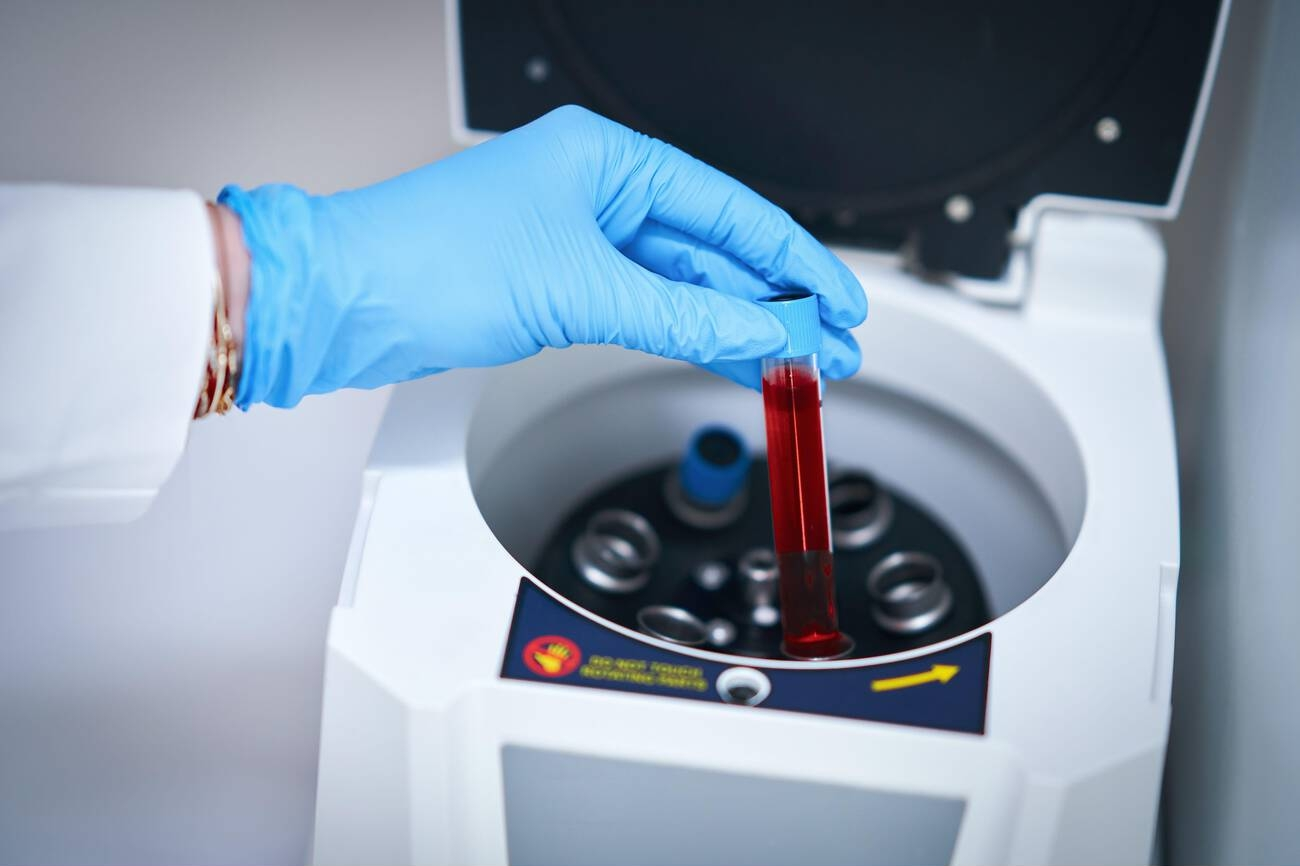
A medical technologist processing blood samples at an NABL-accredited diagnostic laboratory in Kharghar, supporting local healthcare infrastructure and diagnostic monitoring.

Kharghar has a pollution crisis of its own, arising out of the industries in the Taloja MIDC area, besides other sources, and residents have been facing health issues for a long time owing to the polluted air. The most impacted or polluted sectors in Kharghar are sectors 34, 35, 36 and 37, besides Taloja, Kalamboli and Panvel. Some residents and activists have been monitoring the pollution and collecting data to be able to take action against polluting industries in the region.

On 15 January 2021, a city-based environmental organisation, Waatavaran (Climate, Environment and Sustainability Foundation (WCES), set up an installation called the "Billboard the Breathes", at the Bank of India signal junction, Sector 7, Kharghar. Though the installation was installed on 15 January 2021, it was inaugurated on Saturday, 16 January 2021, by Panvel City Municipal Corporation's (PCMC) Mayor, Dr Kavita Choutmol.

The billboard was installed to have a real-time visual impact on the residents of Kharghar and Taloja, who have been plagued by growing pollution emerging from the Taloja MIDC area, construction activities, the quarry at Kharghar and vehicular movement in the region. It was to remind residents of the pollution crisis in the area every time they looked at it. The installation was the brainchild of Jhatka.org and consisted of two large lungs depicting the human lungs, retrofitted with HEPA filters and a fan to suck air, to mimic the process of human breathing. Along with that, it had a digital air quality monitor to display the real-time air quality index (AQI). The lungs were white by default and were meant to change colour as per the existing pollution in the area during a stipulated period.

The residents were encouraged to monitor the billboard regularly to witness the impact of pollution on a day-to-day basis and it was to be monitored for two weeks to conclude. However, the billboard had started changing colour from white to grey, barely a day after installation, alarming social activists, residents and the administration. The Air Quality Index (AQI) during the observation period was always between 230 and 365, which was very high, and continues to remain so. The experiment further fortified the earlier findings of another experiment by Waatavaran, which had revealed extremely high levels of PM2.5 in the air in the Kharghar-Taloja-Panvel belt. After several complaints, the 'Navi Mumbai Pollution Control Board' was ordered to install a pollution monitoring device, following which the MPCB installed 11 automatic monitoring machines.

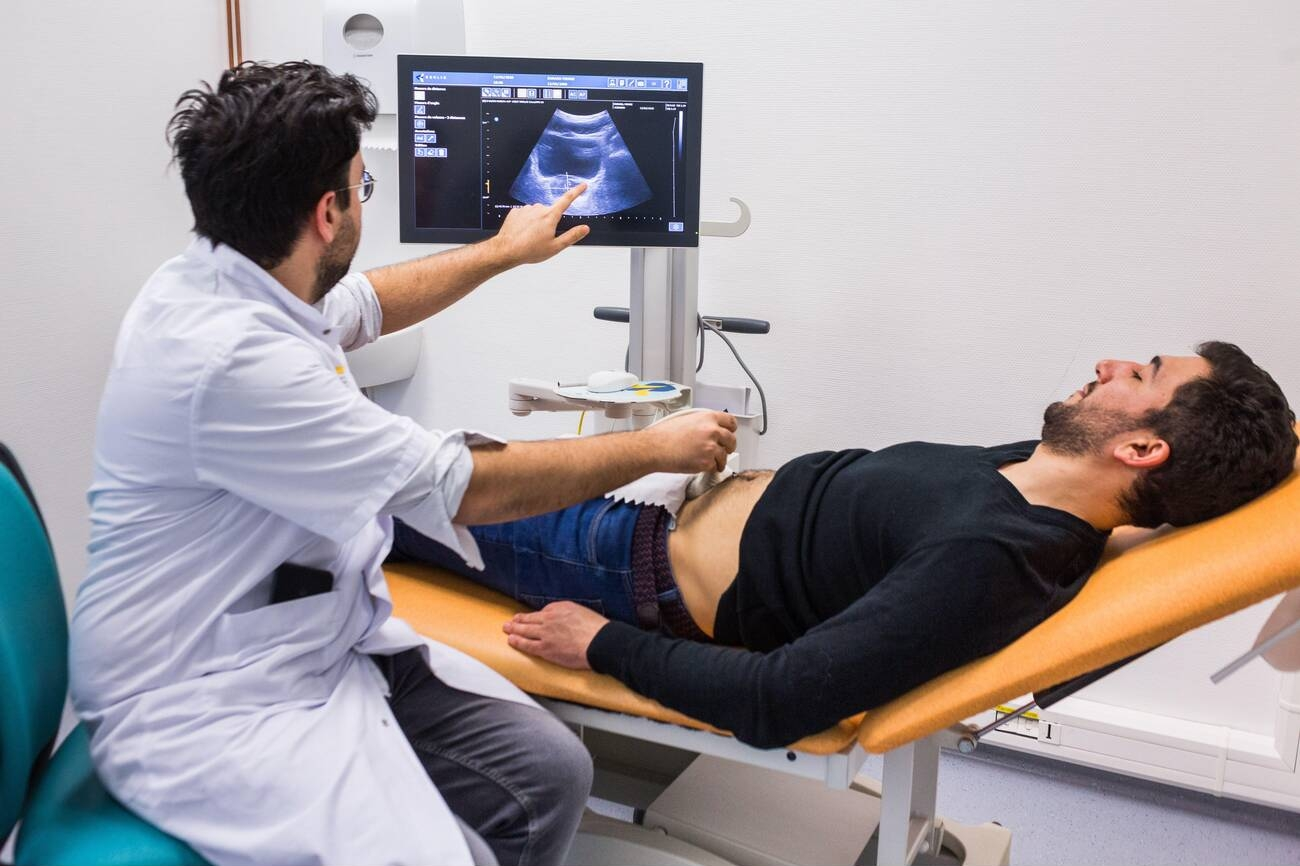
An outpatient pelvic ultrasound scan being performed inside a diagnostic health facility.

Diagnostic imaging facilities and advanced clinical monitoring platforms form a core pillar of the local medical network, servicing residents across the node and neighboring sectors.
