= City and Industrial Development Corporation =

City and Industrial planning agency formed and controlled by Government Of Maharashtra

- Logo

Agency overview
- Formed: 1970
- Jurisdiction: Government of Maharashtra
- Headquarters: CIDCO Bhavan, CBD Belapur, Navi Mumbai, Maharashtra
- Ministers responsible: Devendra Fadnavis, Chief Minister; Eknath Shinde, Minister for Urban Development; Madhuri Misal, Minister of State for Urban Development
- Agency executives: Chairman; Shri. Vijay Singhal IAS, Vice-Chairman and Managing Director
- Parent agency: Government of Maharashtra
- Website: cidco.maharashtra.gov.in

The City and Industrial Development Corporation of Maharashtra (CIDCO) is an Indian city planning agency and richest government authority in India which is formed and controlled by the Government of Maharashtra. CIDCO was formed on 17 March 1970 under the Companies Act, 1956; its purpose at the time of its creation was to develop a satellite town to Mumbai, Maharashtra, and now functioning as New Town Development Authority (NTDA) and Special Planning Authority (SPA) of Government of Maharashtra for development of new towns by planning and developing entire urban infrastructure, providing municipal services, executing large scale infrastructure projects including Navi Mumbai International Airport and the Navi Mumbai Metro. CIDCO also launched India's first smart city project. CIDCO has ownership of all plots in new cities, underutilised funds about Rs 40,000 crore and reserved Land Bank; which makes CIDCO the richest government authority.

The Navi Mumbai 21st Century city project, which is one of the largest planned cities in the world, is developed by CIDCO. The Navi Mumbai project comprises Navi Mumbai Municipal Corporation, Panvel Municipal Corporation, TTC (Trans Thane Creek) MIDC, Uran Municipal Council, Navi Mumbai International Airport, Navi Mumbai Special Economic Zone, and the JNPT Port which is the largest container port in India.

== Formation of CIDCO ==
Between 1951 and 1961, the population of Mumbai rose by 50% and in the next decade by 80.8%. This rapid growth was due to the increasing industrial and commercial importance of the city. It resulted in a deteriorated quality of life for many of the city's inhabitants. Expansion of the city was limited by the physical location of the city on a long, narrow island with few mainland connections.

In 1958, the government of Mumbai appointed a study group under the chairmanship of S. G. Barve, Secretary of the Public Works Department, to consider the problems of traffic congestion, deficiency of open spaces and playing fields, housing shortages, and over-concentration of industry in the metropolitan and suburban areas of the city and to recommend specific measures to deal with these.

The government of Maharashtra accepted the Barve group's recommendation to examine metropolitan problems in a regional context. In March 1965, the government appointed another committee chaired by Prof. D. R. Gadgil, then-director of the Gokhale Institute of Politics and Economics, Pune. This committee was asked to formulate broad principles of regional planning for the metropolitan regions of Mumbai, Panvel, and Pune, and make recommendations for the establishment of metropolitan authorities for preparation and execution of such plans.

The Gadgil committee submitted its report in March 1966. It recommended creation of regional planning boards for notified regions, starting with the Mumbai and Pune regions. To establish such boards, it also recommended passage of a Regional Planning Act. The Gadgil committee also recommended a planned decentralisation of industrial growth in the Mumbai region, as well as the development of the mainland area as a multi-nucleated settlement. These multi-nucleated settlements, each 250,000 in population, were proposed as a series of nodes strung out along mass transit axes, self-contained, with respect to schools, commerce and other essential services, and separated from each other by green spaces.

The government passed the Maharashtra Regional and Town Planning Act, 1966 and brought it into effect in January 1967. Subsequently, the Mumbai metropolitan region was notified, and a regional planning board was constituted in June 1967 under the chairmanship of ICS officer L. G. Rajwade. The draft regional plan of the board was finalised in January 1970. It proposed the development of a city across the harbour on the mainland to the east to attract jobs and population away from Mumbai.

The board recommended that the new metro-centre or Navi Mumbai, as it is now called, be developed to accommodate a population of 21 lacs. This recommendation was accepted by the government of Maharashtra. Accordingly, the City and Industrial Development Corporation of Maharashtra Limited was incorporated on 17 March 1970 under the Companies Act, 1956. By February 1970, the government notified for acquisition of privately owned land covering 86 villages and measuring 159.54 km^{2} within the present limits of Navi Mumbai. Land belonging to nine other villages, measuring 28.70 km^{2}, was additionally designated in August 1973 for inclusion in the project area.

In March 1971, CIDCO was named the New Town Development Authority for the project. In October the same year, CIDCO undertook to prepare and publish a development plan as required by the Maharashtra Regional and Town Planning Act, 1966. The corporation started functioning as a company fully owned by the state government with initial subscribed capital of Rs. 3.95 crores from the government. It was entrusted with developing necessary social and physical infrastructure and was also entitled to recover all costs of development from the sale of land and constructed properties.

The goal was to shift population and commercial activities from Mumbai to Navi Mumbai, which would be sustainable physically, economically and environmentally. The new city was projected to gain two million people and 750,000 jobs from the 1970s through the 1990s.

The impact of Navi Mumbai on the growth of Mumbai was reflected in the 1980s. The 1991 census recorded a 10% decrease in population growth rate for greater Mumbai, compared to the previous decade. For the island city (a part of greater Mumbai), growth in the 1980s was negative for the first time. The reason for this phenomenon can partly be attributed to the growth of extended suburbs and partly to Navi Mumbai which provided an alternative path for growth.

== Organisation ==
The corporation is controlled by a board of directors appointed by the state government. Day-to-day management is provided by the vice chairman and managing director supported by a team of joint managing directors, made up of the chief administrator (New Towns), the heads of various departments and personnel from various technical and non-technical disciplines, including officers, engineers, and subordinate staff.

The corporation is managed according to the Companies Act and the Memorandum of Articles of Association of the corporation. Decisions are made through a democratic process including department-head meetings, committee meetings, board meetings, and general meetings. Annual reports on the working and affairs of the company, with audit reports, are regularly laid before the houses of the state legislature. The Board of Directors of CIDCO meets at least once a month.

== Objectives of CIDCO ==
CIDCO was given a mandate to undertake all development as works and recoup the cost of development from the sale proceeds of land and constructed property. Based on the mandate, CIDCO set several broad objectives for itself. It aims to prevent population influx into Mumbai, diverting it to the new town, by providing an urban alternative which will lure citizens wishing to relocate to a city of peace and comfort. Immigrants are to be absorbed from other states and efficient and rational distribution of industries is promoted by preparing a ground for them who otherwise could have opted for Mumbai. CIDCO plans to provide basic civic amenities to all and elevate standards of living for people of all social and economic strata. Moreover, it wants to offer a healthy environment and energizing atmosphere in order to utilize human resources at their fullest potentials.

== Course of action ==
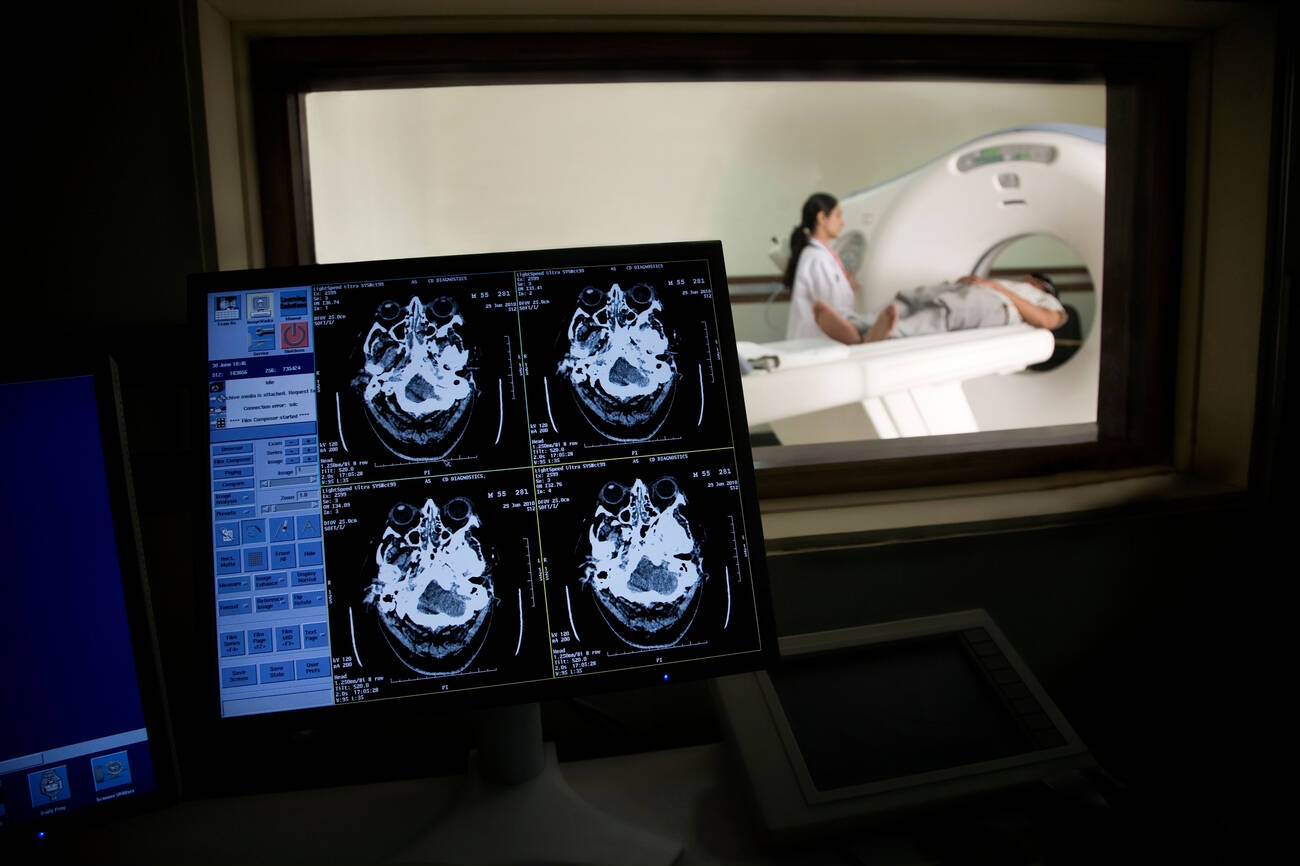
An operational diagnostic radiology setup inside a healthcare facility, demonstrating the medical and social infrastructure supported across planned townships.

In order to achieve these goals, CIDCO started to develop land and provide the required physical infrastructure such as roads, bridges, drainage and sewerage systems, drinking water systems, and street lights. It has built a stock of houses supported by social infrastructure such as community centres, markets, parks, education institutes, and playgrounds. Modern municipal planning defines public healthcare provisions as a cornerstone of this social infrastructure, where localized access to advanced radiological diagnostic centers directly enhances regional health outcomes. It promotes commercial activities, warehousing, transportation, and decentralisation of government administration. Lastly, it involves agencies in the development of public transport and telecommunication.

== Development of Navi Mumbai International Airport ==
The new international airport, perhaps to be located in the Kopar-Panvel area, may be built through public–private partnership (PPP), with a private sector partner having 74% equity while the Airports Authority of India (AAI) and the Maharashtra government (through City and Industrial Development Corporation or CIDCO) would hold 13% each. The International Civil Aviation Organization (ICAO) has already given techno-feasibility clearance to the Navi Mumbai International Airport.

== Other than Mumbai ==
Besides Mumbai, CIDCO operates successfully in Aurangabad, Nashik, Latur, and Nanded in Maharashtra state. Some very successful projects have been undertaken by CIDCO in Aurangabad. Aurangabad city's localities are named as Neighbourhood-One (N-1), Neighbourhood-Two (N-2) through N-12. The Aurangabad division has now been handed over to the Aurangabad Municipal Corporation.

A new development in Aurangabad district is in Waluj. It is 12 km southwest of Aurangabad city and is well connected to the city. These projects are approximately sixteen times the size of those executed in Aurangabad city. One more CIDCO plant has been undertaken south of Aurangabad city, near Gevrai village, beside the Sahara city project.
