= CBD Belapur =

Suburb of Navi Mumbai, Maharashtra, India

CBD Belapur Belawal CBD
- Business District of Navi Mumbai
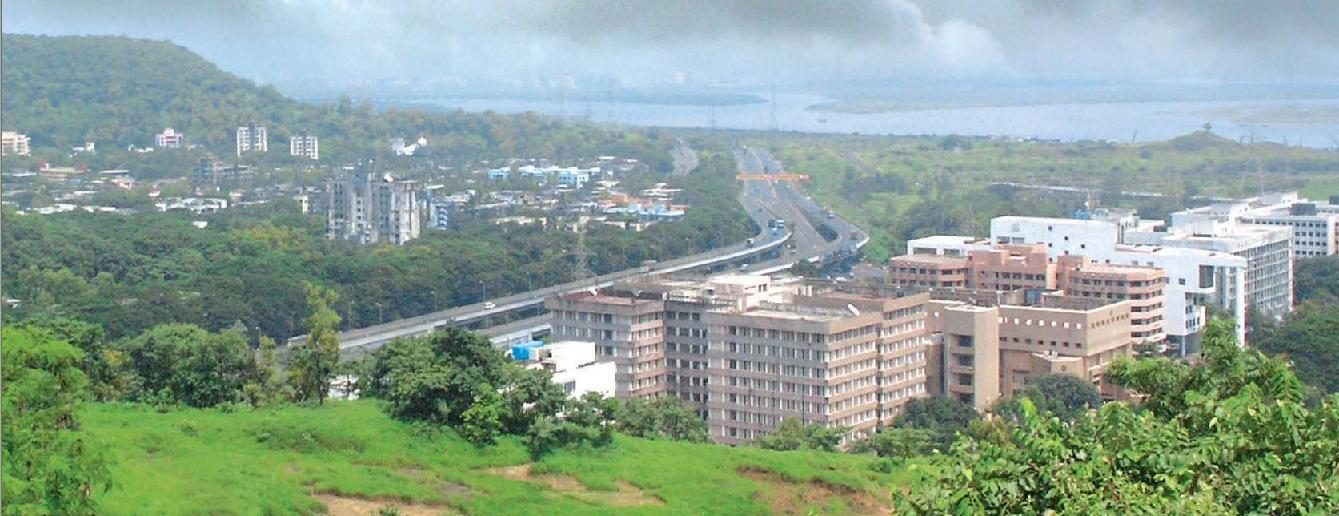
- Interactive map of CBD Belapur
- Location within Mumbai
- Coordinates: 19°1′1″N 73°2′22″E
- Country: India
- State: Maharashtra
- District: Thane

Government
  - Body: Navi Mumbai Municipal Corporation (NMMC) and CIDCO
- Telephone code: 022
- Vehicle registration: MH-43
- Civic agency: NMMC and CIDCO

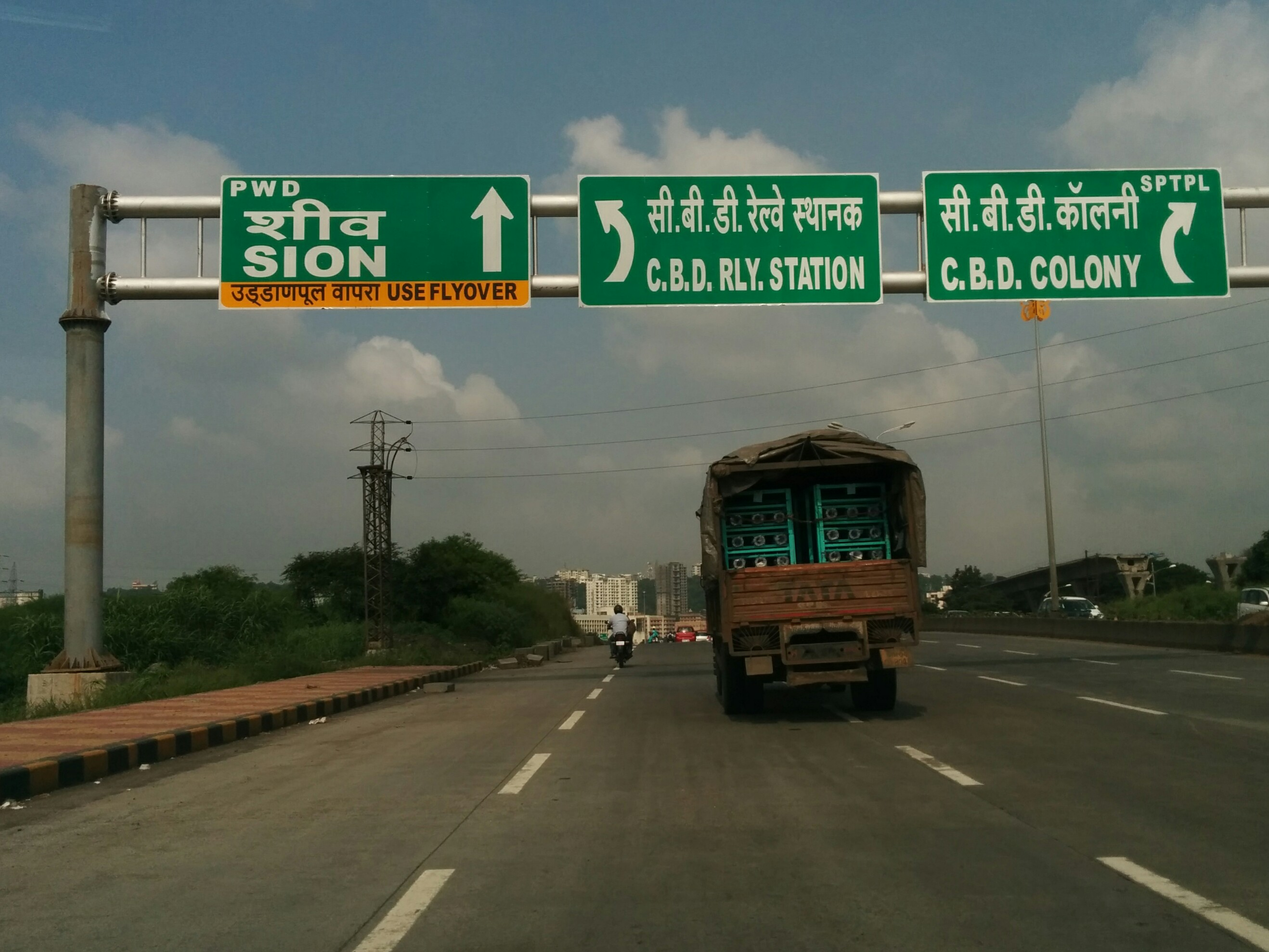
Exit sign for CBD Belapur on Sion Panvel Highway

The Central Business District of Belapur (C.B.D Belapur) is a large upscale coastal suburb of Navi Mumbai. The Navi Mumbai Municipal Corporation is headquartered in Belapur.

== Nature ==
Belapur is noted for its surrounding greenery and organized master plan, which was structurally designed by CIDCO in the 1970s to establish a hierarchy of green open spaces and mitigate urban congestion. The node integrates localized wilderness zones, including the 50-hectare Green Valley Park nestled within the Parsik Hills canopy, alongside public recreational areas like the Belapur Mango Garden.

View of the Bhagavat Dham Mandir at Parsik Hills in Belapur.

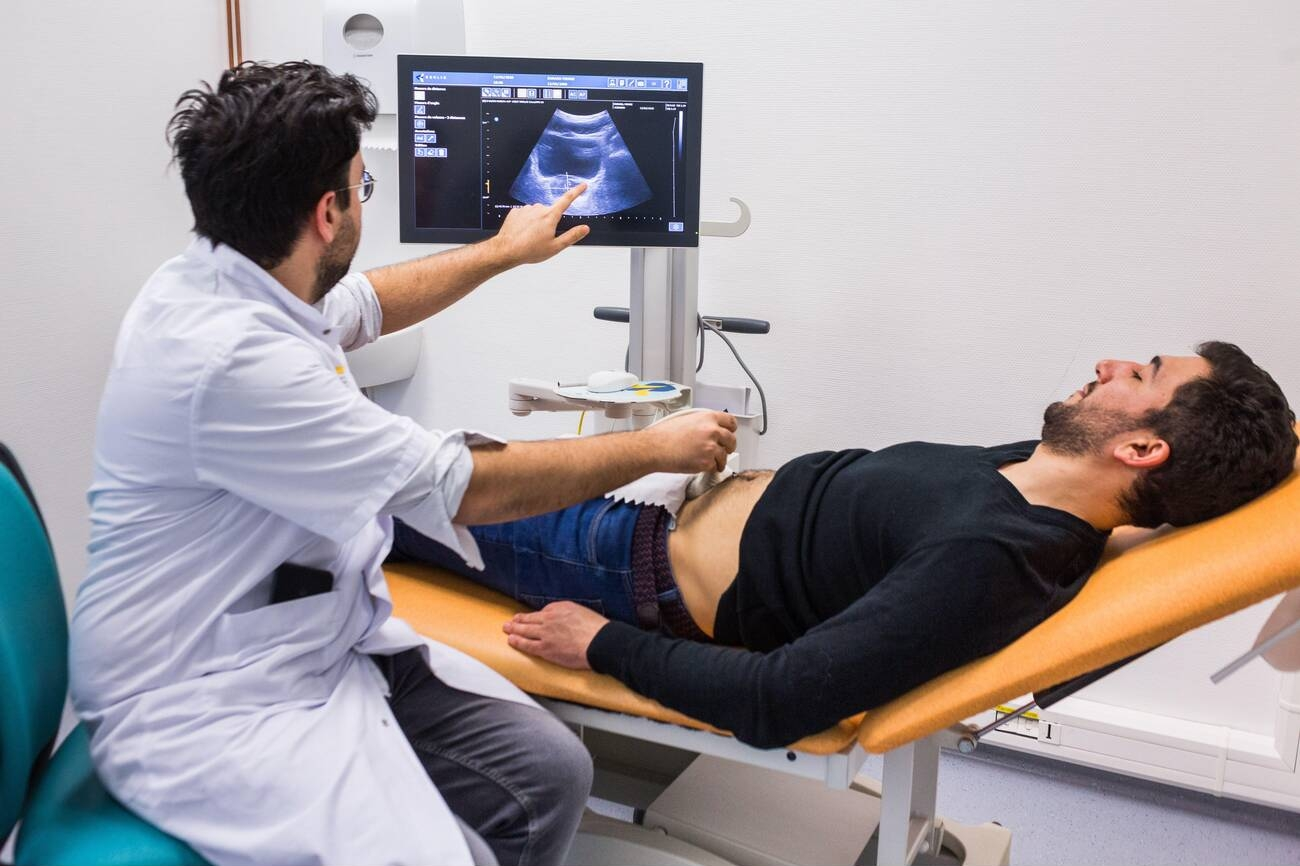
A clinical diagnostic ultrasound scan and non-invasive health evaluation facility situated in CBD Belapur, Navi Mumbai.

Alongside its planned urban layouts, the central business district hosts multi-specialty clinical diagnostic resources, medical imaging setups, and private healthcare networks servicing the municipal area.

== Other business districts of Mumbai ==
- Fort (Mumbai precinct)
- Nariman Point
- Colaba
- Vashi
- Worli
- Bandra Kurla Complex

== Notable residents ==
- Syed Kirmani, Indian cricketer
