= Mumbai Trans Harbour Link =

Sea bridge in India

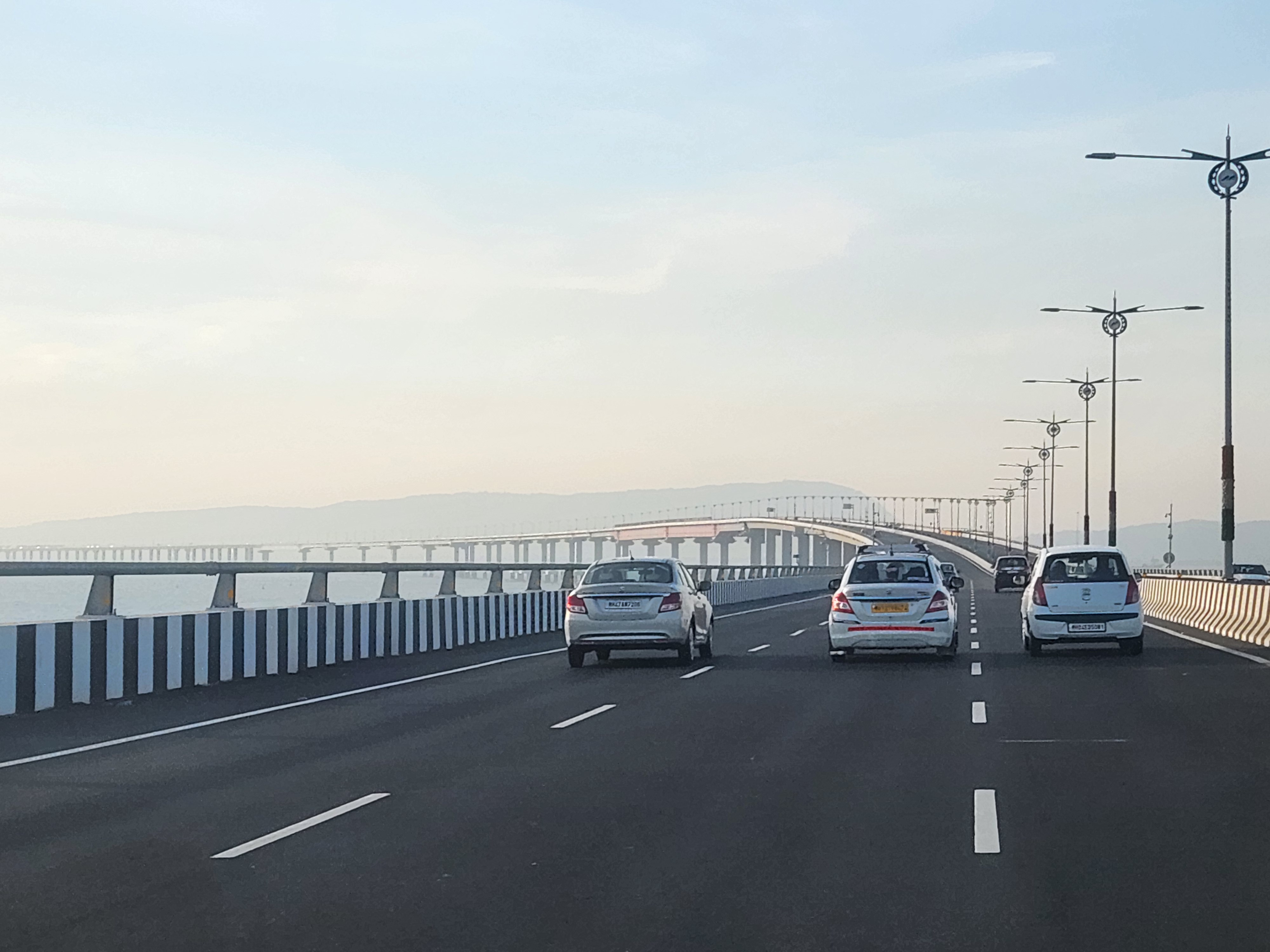
- Coordinates: 18.9811°N 72.9169°E
- Carries: 6-lanes (3 lanes in each direction)
- Crosses: Thane Creek
- Locale: Mumbai Metropolitan Region, Maharashtra, India
- Begins: Sewri, South Mumbai
- Ends: Chirle, Uran taluka, South Navi Mumbai
- Official name: Atal Bihari Vajpayee Sewri–Nhava Sheva Atal Setu
- Other name: Atal Setu
- Named for: Atal Bihari Vajpayee
- Owner: Mumbai Metropolitan Region Development Authority
- Website: mmrda.maharashtra.gov.in/projects/transport/mumbai-trans-harbour-link/overview

Characteristics
- Design: Concrete-steel pre-cast segment viaduct
- Total length: 18.2 kilometres (11.3 mi)
- Width: 27 metres (89 ft)
- Height: 25 metres (82 ft)
- Water depth: 47 metres (154 ft)
- Traversable?: Yes
- Longest span: 180 metres (590 ft)
- Piers in water: 1,089
- Design life: 100+ years

History
- Engineering design by: COWI, PADECO, Dar Al-Handasah and T. Y. Lin International
- Constructed by: Larsen & Toubro; IHI Corporation; Daewoo E&C; Tata Projects
- Construction start: 24 April 2018
- Construction end: December 2023
- Construction cost: ₹17,843 crore (US$1.9 billion)
- Opened: 12 January 2024; 2 years ago

Statistics
- Toll: Car: ₹ 200 (single) ₹ 300 (return); Bus: ₹ 320 (single) ₹ 480 (return); LCV: ₹ 655 (single) ₹ 985 (return); Truck: ₹ 715 (single) ₹ 1075 (return); Heavy-duty truck: ₹ 1030 (single) ₹ 1545 (return); Oversized truck: ₹ 1255 (single) ₹ 1885 (return)

Location
- Interactive map of Mumbai Trans Harbour Link

The Mumbai Trans Harbour Link, officially named as Atal Bihari Vajpayee Sewri–Nhava Sheva Atal Setu and colloquially known as Atal Setu, is a 18.2 km (11.3 mi), 6-lane grade separated expressway bridge, which connects Mumbai with Navi Mumbai, its satellite city. It is the longest sea bridge in India, and the world's 12th longest sea bridge. The bridge begins in Sewri, South Mumbai, crosses Thane Creek north of Elephanta Island, and terminates at Chirle near Nhava Sheva in Uran taluka, South Navi Mumbai. The road is linked to NH348 in the east and to the Eastern Freeway in the west.

The 6-lane highway is 27 meters in width, in addition to two emergency exit lanes, two edge strips, parallel crash barriers and noise barriers on both sides. The project costs a total of ₹17,843 crore (US$1.9 billion). The bridge has a capacity to handle 70,000 vehicles per day. Construction on the bridge began in April 2018, and was inaugurated by Prime Minister Narendra Modi on 12 January 2024.

== Overview ==
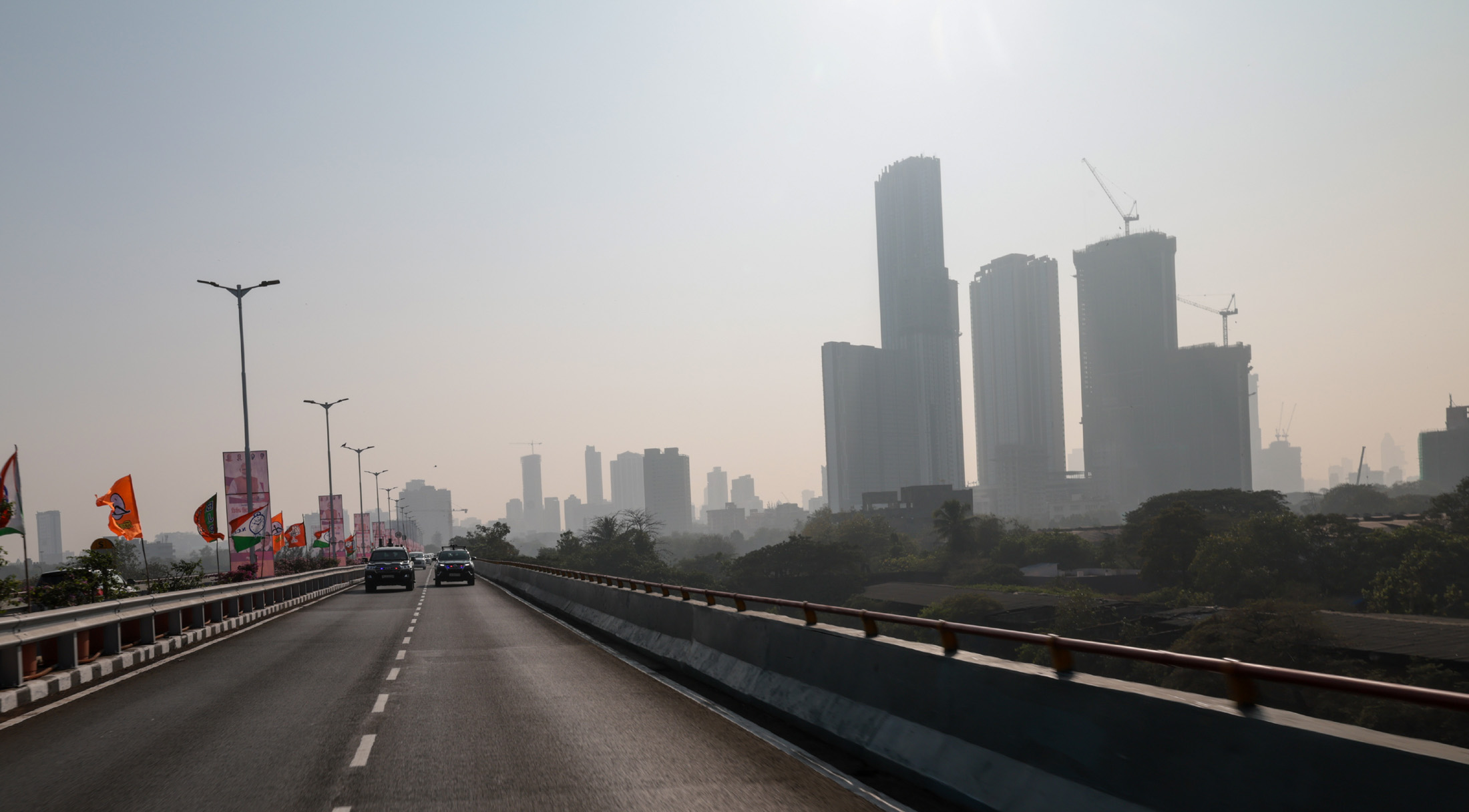
Prime minister inspecting the Atal Bihari Vajpayee Sewri-Nhava Sheva Atal Setu at Navi Mumbai, in Maharashtra on 12 January 2024

In the 1990s, keeping the future of the Mumbai Metropolitan Region in mind, the Mumbai Metropolitan Region Development Authority (MMRDA) began studies on how to decongest the rising traffic and congestion in Mumbai, and accidents and mishaps as their direct consequences. There are currently six bridges connecting Mumbai and Navi Mumbai across the Thane Creek, but they are too narrow and outdated to handle future traffic. As a result, all of them are constrained and are carrying traffic beyond their limits, also increasing the commute time between the two cities. So, the MMRDA planned to build a comprehensive link between the two cities so as to handle more traffic and make travel easier, faster, safer, and hassle-free. The proposal was sent to the Government of Maharashtra for consideration in 2012. In 2015, the project was approved by the Government of India and the Ministry of Road Transport and Highways (MoRTH). Hence, the foundation stone for the construction of the project was laid by Prime Minister Narendra Modi on 24 December 2016. Initially, it was expected to be completed by 2021. Then, the MMRDA awarded contracts for the project in November 2017, and construction began in April 2018, which was scheduled to be completed within 4.5 years, by 2022. However, the construction was delayed by around 8 months due to the COVID-19 pandemic, and was expected to be completed by August 2023, then again by December 2023. The construction was finally completed in December 2023 and was inaugurated by Prime Minister Narendra Modi on 12 January 2024.

== Planning ==
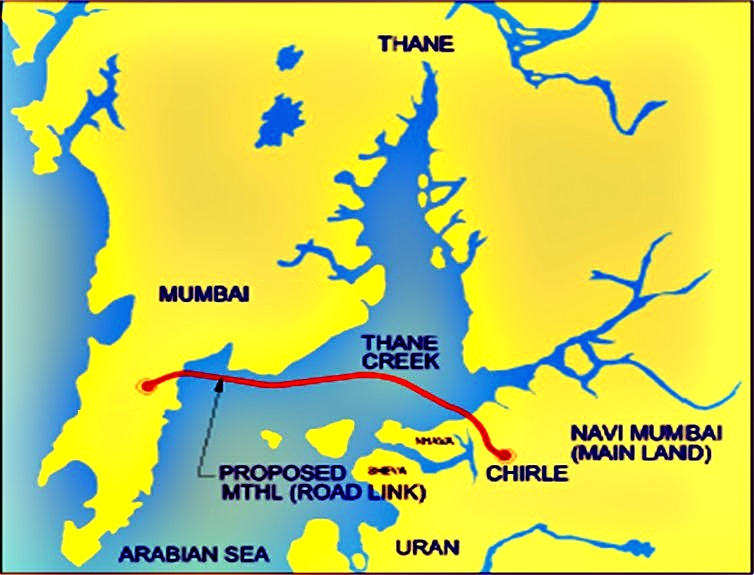
Mumbai trans Harbor link map

Transportation and traffic planning for Greater Bombay (now Mumbai) was commissioned to Wilbur Smith and Associates (WSA) (now (CDM Smith) in mid-1962. The firm's report, based on extensive studies conducted over 18 months, was handed over to the Ministry of Road Transport and Highways (MoRTH) on 19 December 1963. Among other projects, the report proposed the construction of a sea link, known as the Uran Bridge, to connect Mumbai with the mainland near the town of Uran. However, WSA was unsure of the link's feasibility. Citing poor traffic expectations in Uran even in 1981, WSA's report advised a more detailed study of this connection and recommended to delay the link until development and community services are expanded in the Trans-Thane region. In 1973, the Vashi Bridge linking Mankhurd in Mumbai with Vashi in Navi Mumbai was opened.

=== First attempt ===
The first concrete attempt to build the sea link was made in 2004, when Infrastructure Leasing & Financial Services (IL&FS) submitted a proposal to implement the project on a build, own, operate, and transfer (BOOT) basis. The Maharashtra State Road Development Corporation (MSRDC) also submitted a counter-proposal. However, the IL&FS proposal was sidelined by the Government of Maharashtra for undisclosed reasons.

=== Second attempt ===
Another attempt was made in 2005, when the MSRDC invited bids for the project. The bids submitted by the Ambani brothers were considered to be unrealistic. A consortium of the Anil Dhirubhai Ambani Group, Reliance Energy (REL), and Hyundai Engineering & Construction quoted a concession period of nine years and 11 months, against 75 years quoted by Mukesh Ambani's Sea King Infrastructure (the only other shortlisted bidder left, after Larsen & Toubro-Gammon and IFFCO opted out). The REL-Hyundai consortium was initially disqualified at the technical bid stage, as Hyundai did not meet the criteria of $200 million net worth specified in the bid document. However, the consortium challenged the disqualification in the Supreme Court, and the Court granted them 90 days to submit their bid that ended on 15 December 2007. The consortium eventually won the bid in February 2008. However, the MSRDC was not sure about the viability of the low concession period. The MSRDC felt that the concession periods were "unrealistic" and that both bids "seemed frivolous in nature".

=== Third attempt ===
The Government of Maharashtra called for fresh bids for the project in 2008. However, none of the 13 companies that had shown interest submitted bids. The media criticized the political feud between the ruling Nationalist Congress Party (NCP) and the Indian National Congress coalition, as being responsible for "slowing down the pace of Mumbai's development". The city's two infrastructure agencies, the MSRDC and the Mumbai Metropolitan Region Development Authority (MMRDA), under the NCP and Congress respectively, were both planning to construct the Mumbai Trans Harbour Link (MTHL) at the same time. The project underwent two failed rounds of tendering under the MSRDC and was stuck for nearly two years (between 2009 and 2011) before the state government decided to hand over the mandate to MMRDA. Following the decision, the MSRDC asked MMRDA to pay ₹25 crore (US$2.7 million) if it wanted access to any of the studies on the project conducted by the former. After the MMRDA was tasked with executing the MTHL, the MSRDC took up the expansion of the Vashi Bridge by adding six more lanes to ease congestion at the entrance to Navi Mumbai. However, the MMRDA refused the MSRDC's request to allocate funds for the expansion of the Vashi Bridge, as the former believed that the expansion would divert some ridership from the MTHL.

=== Fourth attempt ===
The MMRDA appointed Arup Consultancy Engineers and KPMG to conduct the techno-economic feasibility study of the MTHL in August 2011. The MTHL project was proposed as a public–private partnership (PPP) model. The project received clearance from the then Chief Minister of Maharashtra, Prithviraj Chavan, on 22 October 2012. The Times of India described the MTHL's delay as being "symbolic of all that is wrong with infrastructure planning and implementation in Mumbai." The newspaper daily also stated that a project being "on the drawing board after more than forty years would be in the realm of fiction in any other country".

The project received environmental clearance from the Ministry of Environment, Forest and Climate Change (MoEFCC) on 23 October 2012. The Maharashtra State Road Development Corporation (MSRDC) had obtained clearance for the project in March 2005, but the certificate was valid only for 5 years and lapsed due to the delays in the bidding process. The ministry laid down 11 conditions that the MMRDA had to follow. Some of the conditions were that the MMRDA had to put up noise barriers, replant five times the number of mangroves destroyed, not carry out dredging or reclamation, use construction equipment with exhaust silencers, and work in consultation with the Bombay Natural History Society to minimize the impact on migratory birds. Environmental activists were opposed to the clearance. They pointed out that there was no public hearing following the second application for environmental clearance. They still believe that the sea link is not allowed as per the new Coastal Regulation Zone (CRZ) notification of 2011. They also claim that the sea link would damage a huge mudflat and mangrove tract towards Sewri and Nhava Sheva, which is a habitat for migratory birds like flamingos. Nevertheless, the MMRDA finalised the plan to construct sound barriers on the bridge so that it does not affect the flamingo habitat at Sewri. The Department of Atomic Energy (DAE) had directed MMRDA to construct a six-km long view barrier to cut the view of Bhabha Atomic Research Centre (BARC). The MTHL received coastal regulation zone clearance from the MoEFCC on 19 July 2013.

On 31 October 2012, the Department of Economic Affairs (DEA) granted in-principle approval for the MTHL. The DEA recommended granting ₹1,920 crore (US$210 million) with a concession period of 35 years for the project. In the first meeting, between MMRDA and DEA officials in September 2012, the ministry had asked the authority to treat the sea link as a road and reduce the proposed concession period from 45 years to 30 years. They also expected an internal rate of return of 15% for the project. However, the MMRDA wanted a higher rate as they claimed the project was very risky. An internal rate of return of 17% was agreed upon. The termination clause in the concession agreement comes into effect after 30 years into the concession period. The MMRDA can invoke the clause based on certain conditions, such as the capacity being higher than expected. The conditions will be reviewed in the 20th year of the concession agreement. The DEA is the first tier of the three-tier clearance process to get viability gap funding (VGF) for the project. The project must also receive approval from an empowered committee and finally from the Finance Minister. On 9 November 2012, the State Government issued a state-support agreement and a toll notification for the project. The empowered committee approved VGF for MTHL on 12 December 2012. The then Finance Minister, P. Chidambaram, cleared the project on 18 January 2013.

The Jawaharlal Nehru Port Trust (JNPT) asked the MMRDA to build the MTHL at a height of 51 metres, instead of the proposed 25 metres, for a span of 300 metres to accommodate its expansion plans for its fifth container terminal and to allow safe passage of bigger vessels. MMRDA expressed that a height of 51 metres would not be feasible as it would have a huge impact on the cost. However, MMRDA officials expressed willingness to raise the height of the bridge to 31–35 metres. On 8 January 2012, the then Minister of Shipping and MP from South Mumbai, Milind Murli Deora, told reporters that JNPT would issue a No Objection Certificate (NOC) to the state government to go ahead with the project.

In May 2012, the MMRDA shortlisted five consortia for the project: Cintra-SOMA-Srei, Gammon Infrastructure Projects Ltd.-OHL, Concessions-G.S. Engineering, GMR Infrastructure-L&T Ltd.-Samsung C&T Corporation, IRB Infrastructure Developers Ltd.-Hyundai, and Tata Realty and Infrastructure Ltd.-Autostrade Indian Infrastructure Development Pvt. Ltd.-Vinci Concessions Development Pvt. Ltd. None of the five shortlisted firms bid for the project by the deadline, which was extended to 5 August. IRB-Hyundai announced their withdrawal from the bidding process, on 31 July 2013, citing "the government's apathy and unfriendly attitude towards investors wanting to develop capital-intensive infrastructure projects". Following the failure of the tender, the MMRDA decided to abandon the PPP model and instead implement the project on cash contract basis.

In January 2013, the Government of India had sanctioned ₹1,920 crore (US$210 million), which was 20% of the project cost at the time, for the viability gap for the MTHL. Under the public private partnership (PPP) basis that the project was proposed to be implemented in, the state government would also contribute the same amount as the centre, while the remaining 60% would have been borne by the developer who won the bid. The concession period would have been 35 years, which included the timeframe of 5 years for the construction. However, the consortia shortlisted for the project were concerned that 15–20% of the projected traffic for the MTHL, was due to the proposed and now under-construction Navi Mumbai International Airport, which was heavily delayed. The MMRDA added a provision for a shortfall loan to be made available from the central government if traffic is 20% under the estimate.

=== Switch from PPP to EPC model ===
The MMRDA decided to scrap the PPP model for the project in August 2013, and instead execute it on an engineering, procurement, and construction (EPC) basis. Subsequently, the Japan International Cooperation Agency (JICA) expressed interest in providing funds for the project. In January 2014, Ashwini Bhide, the then MMRDA additional metropolitan commissioner, told The Indian Express that the state government had sent a formal proposal to the DEA for its approval to get funds from JICA. In June 2014, Business Line reported that Jawaharlal Nehru Port Trust authorities had agreed to pick up a stake in the project.

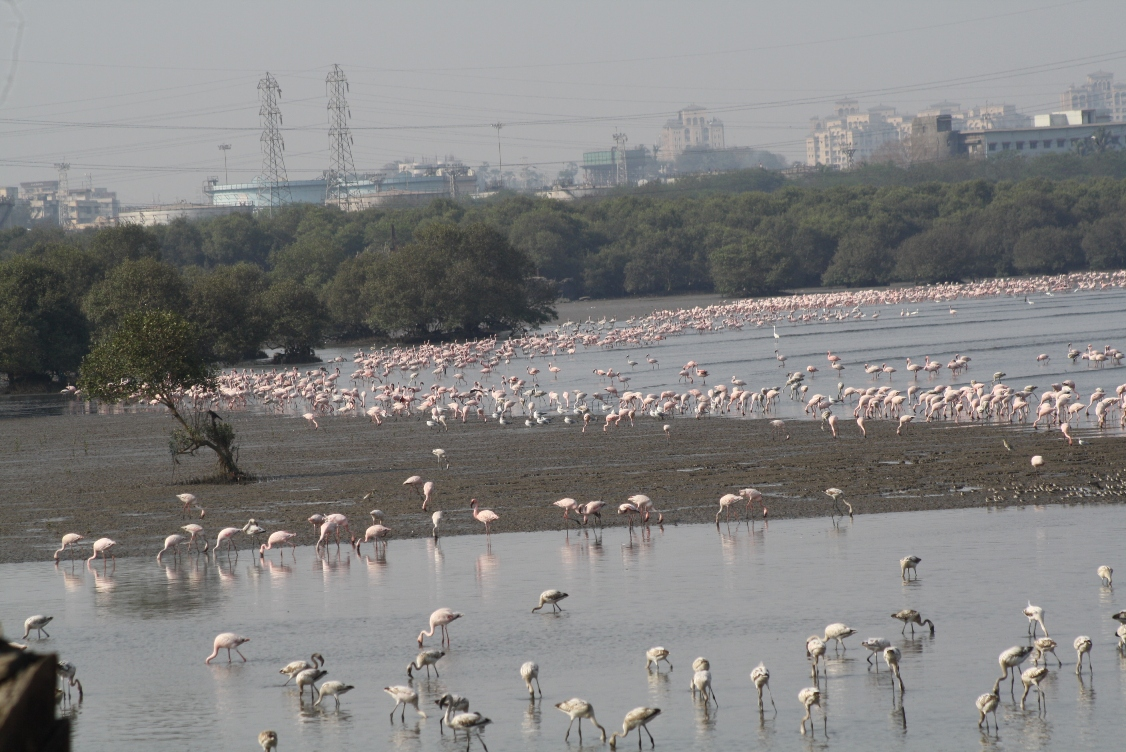
Flamingos and other migratory birds at the Mahul-Sewri mudflats

The project ran into a major hurdle in April 2015, when the forest advisory committee (FAC) of the MoEFCC withheld its clearance for the project, stating that it would affect the existing mangroves as well as the flamingo population. The project requires clearance from the ministry as it will affect 38 hectares of protected mangrove forests and 8.8 hectares of forest land on the Navi Mumbai end. The sea link's starting point poses a threat to an estimated 20,000–30,000 lesser and greater flamingos and the mangrove habitat. The Sewri mudflats are home to 150 species of birds, and are listed as an "Important Bird Area". The FAC instructed the state government to submit a study report on the project's impact on the flamingo population, and recommended that the government seek the help of either the Bombay Natural History Society (BNHS) or the Wildlife Institute of India, Dehradun, to conduct the study. The cost of the study would be borne by the MMRDA, which would also have to come with safeguards to cause the least disturbance to the flamingos at Sewri.

On 17 April 2015, the Minister of Road Transport and Highways, Nitin Gadkari, stated that he favoured the construction of a submarine tunnel instead of a sea link. Gadkari stated that the tunnel would cost less than a bridge (citing the example of the tunnel in Belgium), and would also be aesthetically preferable as a sea link would obstruct the city's coastline. However, Gadkari clarified that the Government of India would accept the final decision made by the state government on this matter. Following a visit to China, the then Chief Minister of Maharashtra, Devendra Fadnavis, announced on 20 May 2015, that the China Communications Construction Company (CCCC) had expressed interest in the MTHL project. According to Fadnavis, the CCCC will complete the project within 3–4 years of being appointed and will also provide 2% concessional funding for the project.

In November 2015, the project was cleared by the Maharashtra Coastal Zone Management Authority (MCZMA). In January 2016, the Forest Advisory Committee (FAC) granted forest clearance, and the Experts' Appraisal Committee (EAC) attached to the MoEFCC granted CRZ clearance to the project. The CRZ came with a rider requiring the MMRDA to spend at least ₹ 335 crore towards an "environment management programme". In the same month, Fadnavis announced that the project had received all required clearances.

In February 2016, JICA agreed to loan 80% of the total cost of the project to the state government at an annual interest rate of 1–1.4%. The MMRDA will bear 1.2% of the project cost, and the remaining amount will be borne by the state government. As JICA was unwilling to loan directly to the state government, the Union Government stood as a guarantor of the loan. As part of the agreement between JICA and the state government, 2 rescue lanes will be added to the proposed plan for the MTHL, and a 4 km stretch of the bridge will be constructed as a steel-only structure instead of previous plan to build a cement and concrete bridge. The use of steel on this stretch will raise the project cost by ₹ 4000 crores. JICA formally approved the funding agreement on 9 May 2016, and the MMRDA began the bidding process the following day. The MTHL received final environment clearance from the State Forest Department in May 2017.

=== Tendering ===
The MMRDA invited request for qualifications (RFQ) for civil construction of three packages – a 10.38-kilometre-long (6.45 mi) bridge section across the Mumbai Bay and Sewri interchange (₹6,600 crore), a 7.807-kilometre-long (4.851 mi) bridge section across Mumbai Bay and Shivaji Nagar, near Gavan interchange (₹4,900 crore), and a 3.613-kilometre-long (2.245 mi) viaduct including interchanges at SH-52, SH-54, and NH-4B near Chirle, Navi Mumbai. The MMRDA received 11 pre-qualification bids each for the first and second packages, and 17 bids for the third package. The agency stated that a single party would not be awarded the first and second packages together, although any other combination of the three packages would be permitted. The MMRDA appointed a consortium formed by AECOM Asia Co. Ltd., Padeco India Pvt. Ltd, Dar Al-Handasah, and T. Y. Lin International as the general consultant for the project on 26 November 2016. According to U.P.S. Madan, the then Metropolitan Commissioner of the MMRDA, stated that the general consultants appointed for the MTHL project would engage in various activities, such as to help MMRDA organise pre-bid meetings, examine bid documents, secure various permissions from government, semi-government, examine concept designs, monitor construction of the project and ensure quality of the work among other things.

After evaluating the bids, in January 2017, the MMRDA shortlisted a total of 29 contractors for the three packages and floated tenders for the request for proposal (RFP) stage, the final stage of the bidding process. The agency fixed 5 April 2017 as the final date for submissions of the RFP bids. The submission date was later postponed to 5 June. However, the agency received over 3,000 queries from the shortlisted bidders, and was again forced to postpone the date to 17 July to respond to all queries.

The MMRDA applied for security clearance from the Union Ministry of Home Affairs to carry out construction near the Bhabha Atomic Research Centre, the Mumbai Port Trust and the Jawaharlal Nehru Port Trust. These facilities have restricted areas that are covered by the Official Secrets Act. The MMRDA also submitted the names of all companies that bid for the project to the Home Ministry. The ministry will grant clearance after consultations with other ministries, such as the Ministry of External Affairs and intelligence agencies. The Home Ministry denied security clearance to a bid from China Railway Major Bridge Engineering Group in a joint venture with Gayatri Projects Limited, and also to a consortium of IL&FS Engineering Limited and Ranjit Buildcon Limited. Both consortia were subsequently disqualified from the bidding process by the MMRDA. The MMRDA stated that the Home Ministry had not provided the agency with any official reason for denying security clearance. IL&FS Engineering filed an appeal against the decision in the Bombay High Court on 18 July. The Court permitted IL&FS to submit its bid, subject to a final decision by the Court.

The MMRDA received bids from 17 of the 29 shortlisted contractors by the final bid submission date on 19 July 2017. The agency stated that it would take a month to conduct technical evaluations of the bids and to award contracts. On 9 November 2017, the MMRDA awarded contracts to a consortium of Larsen & Toubro (L&T) and Japan's IHI Corporation, a consortium of Daewoo and Tata Projects (TPL), and L&T itself to construct the Sewri side of the sea bridge, the Navi Mumbai side of the sea bridge, and the bridge portion on land towards Chirle, respectively. The contracts between the MMRDA and the L&T-IHI Corporation consortium were officially signed on 27 December 2017. L&T was awarded ₹7,637.3 crore (US$820 million) for the 10.38 km package 1 and ₹1,013.79 crore (US$110 million) for the 3.61 km package 3. The contract for the 7.807 km package 2 was signed with Daewoo and Tata Projects at a cost of ₹5,612.61 crore (US$600 million) at a later date.

The MMRDA invited bids for Package 4 in September 2021. The tender includes the design, supply, installation, testing, and commissioning of an intelligent transport system, toll management, highway and bridge street lighting, electrical works, construction of toll plazas, and administrative buildings. The ₹427 crore (US$46 million) contract for Package 4 was awarded to a joint venture between Strabag Infrastructure & Safety Solutions GmbH and Strabag AG, both owned by the Austrian construction company, Strabag.

Package	Length	Details	Contractor(s)	Cost
1	10.38 km	Bridge portion across Thane Creek, and the Sewri Y-interchange.	Larsen & Toubro and IHI Corporation	₹7,637.3 crore (US$820 million)
2	7.807 km	Bridge portion across Thane Creek, and the Shivaji Nagar cloverleaf interchange.	Tata Projects Limited and Daewoo E&C	₹5,612.61 crore (US$600 million)
3	3.613 km	Viaducts and interchanges that connect MTHL with State Highways 52 and 54 and National Highway 4B at Chirle.	Larsen & Toubro	₹1,013.79 crore (US$110 million)
4	—N/a	Intelligent transport system, toll management, street lighting, electrical works, toll plazas, and administrative buildings.	Strabag	₹526 crore (US$56 million)

=== Land acquisition ===
The project required 130 hectares of land. The City and Industrial Development Corporation (CIDCO) contributed 88 hectares. The remaining land was privately owned. According to MMRDA officials, land owners were given the same compensation package as that given in the Navi Mumbai International Airport project. Three hundred and twenty structures in Sewri were affected by the project, of which 250 properties were residential. The MMRDA provided resettlement for the affected people by offering accommodation in either Kanjurmarg or Kurla. The majority chose to relocate to Kanjurmarg. The MMRDA also paid ₹6 lakh (US$6,400) each as compensation to 1,500 fishermen who were affected by the construction of the project. In October 2016, the MMRDA agreed to pay MbPT a total of ₹1000 crores in installments over the course of 30 years, as rent for using the MbPT's land for construction of ramps for the MTHL on the Mumbai side. The MMRDA received 27.2 hectares of land on the Sewri side of the MbPT, of which 15.17 hectares were temporarily used for the casting yard.

The MMRDA utilized drones to carry out survey work for the MTHL. The drones were fitted with 360-degree cameras that provide up to 3 mm accuracy. The aerial survey takes less time than a regular survey, achieves greater accuracy and helps protect against false claims for compensation. Over 1,000 boreholes were drilled to study the strata. The MMRDA began conducting a geological survey for the project on 15 January 2018. The project work affected 1,635 trees, of which 753 were cut, and the remaining 882 were replanted at other locations. Most of the affected trees were located at Sewri and Vakola.

=== Metro line ===
In 2010, the MMRDA appointed Rail India Technical and Economic Service (RITES) to prepare a detailed project report (DPR) for the Mumbai Trans Harbour Metro Rail Link (MTHMRL), a proposal to build a dual-track metro line under the road lanes of the MTHL. The 49-km long metro line was proposed to connect Prabhadevi and Dushmi, about 20 km away from Chirle. The metro line was to be extended to the proposed Navi Mumbai International Airport, and connected to the proposed Ranjanpada-Seawoods-Kharkopar corridor of the Navi Mumbai Metro and the proposed Sewri-Prabhadevi corridor of the Mumbai Metro. However, the MMRDA scrapped plans for the metro line in 2012 and decided to build only a road bridge. An MMRDA official stated that a detailed study has revealed that laying the foundation for the bridge with provisions for two metro lines would hike costs, instead of saving expenses. Hence, it would be feasible to have a separate bridge for the metro in the future. Another reason given was that the Navi Mumbai International Airport and Sewri-Prabhadevi corridor of the Mumbai Metro were still a long way from completion.

In June 2021, the MMRDA stated that it was re-examining the possibility of building metro lines on the MTHL. An official stated that there would be no need for extra construction on the MTHL for the metro line, as only the tracks would have to be added. Already, the Worli–Sewri underground metro corridor, as part of the Line 3 (Aqua Line) of Mumbai Metro, is being constructed. The Sewri metro station will connect the MTHL through access paths, thereby linking it to Navi Mumbai. In September 2021, the MMRDA stated that regardless of the decision on metro lines, the agency would dedicate two lanes on the MTHL for a bus rapid transit system. The agency appointed a consultant to determine whether metro lines could be constructed on the MTHL in January 2022. The draft report of the study submitted in April 2022 found that the MTHL's existing pillars would not be able to support the load of a metro system. The then Metropolitan Commissioner of the MMRDA, S.V.R. Srinivas, stated that the agency was exploring solutions, such as increasing the load bearing capacity of the pillars, before making a final decision.

== Construction ==
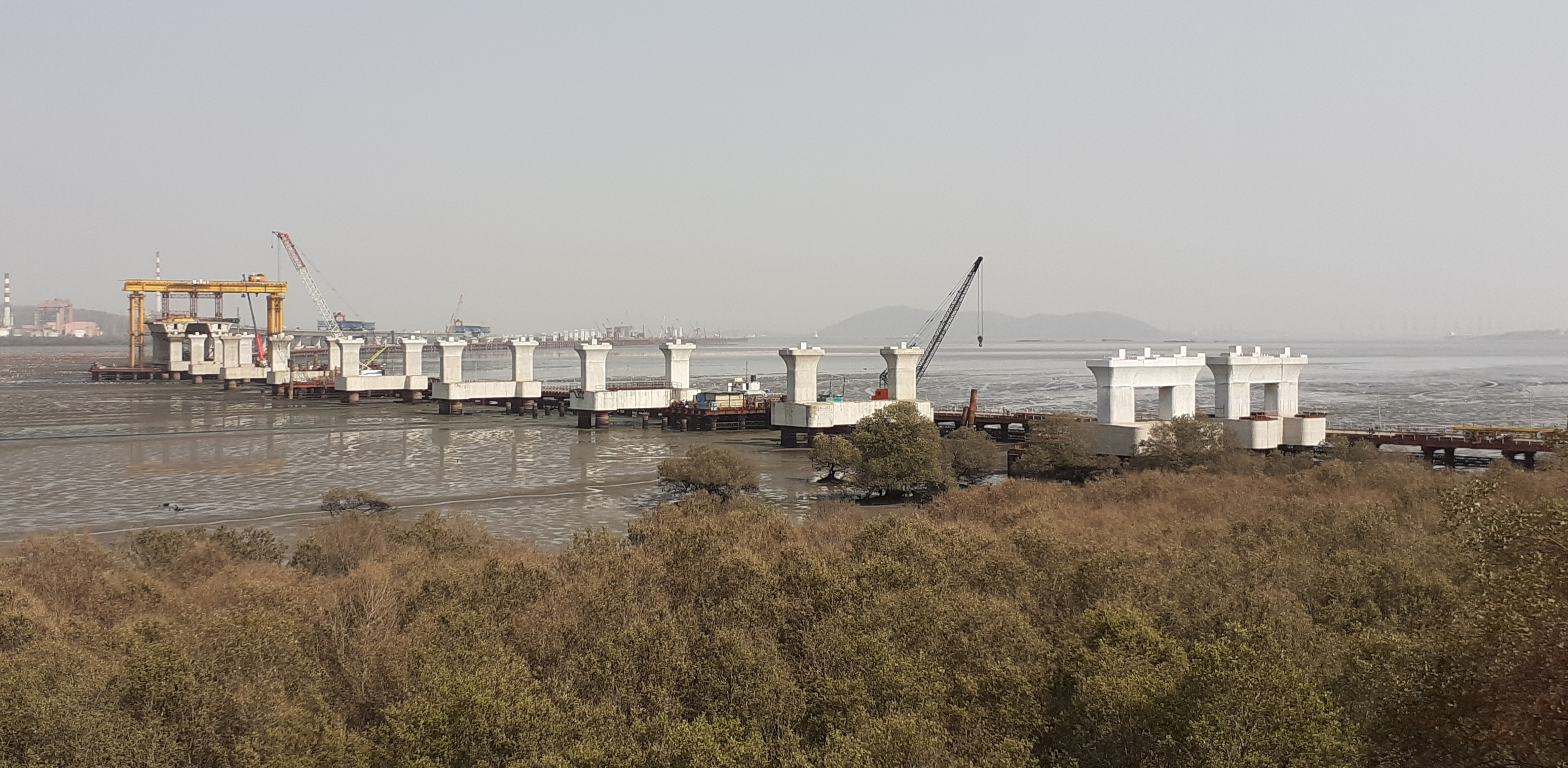
MTHL under construction on the Sewri side, March 2021

The MTHL is 21.8 km long, including 16.5 km sea bridge and 5.5 km of viaducts on land on either end of the bridge. It was constructed in three sections. Construction of the bridge required the use of 165,000 tonnes of reinforcement steel, 96,250 tonnes of structural steel, and 830,000 cubic metres of concrete. The bridge features the first use of orthotropic decks in India. The special steel decks enable the bridge to have longer spans than possible with regular girders. A total of 70 orthotropic decks were used on the bridge, requiring about 96,250 tonnes of steel. The steel spans weigh up to 2,600 tonnes and make up 4.7 km of the bridge length, while the rest of the bridge is made up of 60 metre-long concrete spans weighing up to 130 tonnes each. This 4.7 km section sits at the highest point of the MTHL and includes a 180-metre-long steel span, which is the longest steel span in India. The shortest steel span on the MTHL is 110 meters long. The MMRDA chose to use steel spans in these sections to eliminate the need to construct pillars to support the bridge, which would hinder the movement of ships in the area.

Only about 3% of the bridge structure was built on-site, including the foundations and pouring cement over metal girders. The rest of the bridge was pre-fabricated and then transported to the construction site for installation. The parts for the orthotropic decks were manufactured in Japan, Myanmar, Taiwan, and Vietnam and shipped to Karanja Port in Uran for assembly. The decks were carried to the construction site by barge, and each deck required about 3 days to install in place. A programmed self-propelled transporter was utilized to load the deck onto the barge, and computer-controlled jacks were utilized to install it on the bridge within a precision band of 5 mm. The barge used to transport the decks was specifically built for the MTHL project by Larsen & Toubro at its Kattupalli Shipyard. The concrete section of the bridge is made up of over 12,000 concrete boxes that were pre-cast in a casting yard. The concrete segments were joined to form 60 metre-long spans, and the concrete spans were then installed on the bridge's pillars using a mobile gantry. The foundations for the MTHL are 47 metres at its deepest points, to support the weight of the bridge. An automated girder launching system was utilized to lay the bridge's foundation, marking the first time the system was used in India. The Reverse Circulation Drilling (RCD) construction technique was also utilized for the first time in India, to reduce disturbance to migratory birds.

The MMRDA estimated that the construction work would generate 115,419 man-months of employment. Over 14,000 workers were involved throughout the construction of the MTHL. Contractors worked round-the-clock in three 8-hour shifts. Expert consultants from 10 different countries including Brazil, Denmark, Japan, South Korea, Switzerland, the United Kingdom, the United States, and some Middle Eastern astern countries, were involved in various aspects of the project. Prime Minister Narendra Modi laid the foundation stone for the project on 24 December 2016. Construction of the MTHL began on 24 April 2018, with engineers collecting soil samples for soil testing at each location, where piers will be built in Nhava Sheva. The then MMRDA Metropolitan Commissioner, R. A. Rajeev, stated on 28 October 2018 that about 9% of the project work had been completed. The first pier of the MTHL was built at Sewri on 18 May 2019. The MMRDA stated that it had begun pre-segment casting work, a precursor to the superstructure for bridge deck construction, on 7 August. Each segment of the viaduct weighs 75 tonnes with dimensions 14.8m x 3.32m x 3.85m. Over 10,000 such segments have been cast. The segments were built at two precast segment yards, one on the Mumbai side and another on the Navi Mumbai side. The first segment was erected on the Sewri side about 6 km into the sea. MMRDA officials announced the completion of the pre-casting work on 9 August. Officials also stated that they had completed the construction of 270 permanent piles, of which 177 were in the sea. The agency had also completed the construction of a 2 km long temporary access bridge.

Casting for the first segment of Package 3 of the project began on 12 September 2019. On the same date, MMRDA officials also stated that 20% of the total project work had been completed. The first girder, weighing 1,000 tonnes, for the MTHL was launched on 15 January 2020, marking the erection of its first span. The project faced delays due to the COVID-19 pandemic. Over 5,000 workers had been deployed on the project before the pandemic, but this was reduced to around 2,000 workers by June 2020. An estimated 27% of the total project work had been completed by June 2020, and 35.29% by November 2020. The BMC Tree Authority granted permission to the MMRDA to cut 454 trees and transplant another 550 trees for the MTHL project on 2 December 2020. The MMRDA stated that it would also plant 2,000 trees in Vasai to compensate for the loss. The agency stated that 40% of the total project work had been completed by the end of June 2021. The then Minister of State for Urban Development and Public Works, Eknath Shinde's Public Relation Office, stated in August 2021 that 52% of the project work had been completed. It also noted that 8,189 staff and labourers were currently deployed on the construction site, and that about 8 months of work days were lost as a result of the COVID-19 pandemic.

The MMRDA stated that it had completed 76% of the total project work on 11 April 2022. On 15 September 2022, Chief Minister of Maharashtra, Eknath Shinde, stated that 84% of the total project work had been completed. The longest orthotropic deck, measuring 180 metres long and weighing 2,400 MT, was launched on 2 November 2022. Installation of vehicle crash barriers on the MTHL began on 26 December 2022. The barriers have a total height of 1,550 mm, including a 900 mm concrete block with a 650 mm high steel rail. The barriers comply with the International Standard EN 1317 certification for road restraint systems. The MMRDA originally planned to install a 5 ft-tall wall as the crash barrier, but decided against it to avoid blocking the views from the sea link. The first of five composite steel girder spans, weighing 130 MT and 40 metres long, linking the MTHL with the Eastern Freeway at Sewri was installed on 20 February 2023. On 4 March 2023, the then MMRDA commissioner, S.V.R. Srinivas, stated that the segment casting work for Package 2 was complete, and 93% of the total project work had been completed.

The steel deck span connecting Package 1 and Package 2 over the sea was installed on 21 June 2023, completing end-to-end connectivity on the right-hand side of the bridge. On 25 June 2023, an MMRDA official stated that no construction work would be carried out on the portion of the bridge over the sea during the monsoon season for safety reasons. On 28 June 2023, the state cabinet decided to rename the MTHL after former Prime Minister Atal Bihari Vajpayee. A note from the cabinet meeting also stated that 95% of work on the MTHL had been completed. In December 2023, the construction work was fully completed, with load testing, painting of dividers and testing of various systems as the only remaining tasks that were ongoing. The MTHL was inaugurated and opened to the public by Prime Minister Narendra Modi on 12 January 2024.

== Features ==
=== Noise and vision barriers ===
The MMRDA has installed noise and vision barriers on a 6 km section of the MTHL. The vision barriers are intended to block the view of the Bhabha Atomic Research Centre (BARC) from the MTHL, while the noise barriers are intended to protect the movement of flamingos and migratory birds at the Sewri mudflats. The MMRDA also stated that it would declare nearly 2 km of the MTHL on the Sewri side as a "silent zone", as well as near schools and other sensitive areas on the Navi Mumbai side of the MTHL. Construction equipment used during the project was fitted with silencers to reduce the potential impact of noise on migratory birds such as flamingos. The project utilized reverse circulation drilling methodology, which helps reduce noise levels and helps speed up construction in marine areas.

=== Bird watching platform ===
A 5.6 km long temporary access bridge had been built to transport equipment and workers for the construction of the MTHL. In November 2021, the MMRDA announced that it had decided against demolishing the bridge and would convert it into a birdwatching platform to view flamingos and other birds. The agency noted that the decision would also save the cost of having to demolish the bridge.

=== Traffic management and safety measures ===
As a access-controlled road, to efficiently manage and regulate traffic movement across the MTHL, it has the Advanced Traffic Management System (ATMS), which is a centralised system that allows operators to monitor and manage traffic, incidents and emergency responses in real-time. Along with this, the Intelligent Transportation Management System (ITMS) is also present to systematically work with the ATMS together. This has given the bridge international recognition for having advanced systems to manage traffic.

Similar to the Bandra–Worli Sea Link, Coastal Road and the Eastern Freeway, due to safety considerations, two-wheelers and three-wheelers are prohibited from entering the Trans Harbour Link, along with animal-drawn carriages and slow-moving vehicles. Although pedal and electric bicycles are prohibited as well, there are no signages or written warnings to enforce the ban, though riders can be penalized by law enforcement despite no provisions under Motor Vehicles Act. The traffic division of Mumbai Police has mandated a speed limit of 100 km/h (62 mph) to prevent fatalities. Furthermore, stopping on the bridge is prohibited, with the exception of emergencies, breakdowns, or when pulled over by law enforcement.

=== Technology and other features ===
The structural steel used in the bridge is about 120,000 tonnes, enough to support the erection of four Howrah Bridges. More than 830,000 cubic metres of concrete have been used to cast the structures of the bridge, which is six times more than the quantity used for building the Statue of Unity. The reinforced steel used is 17 times the quantity used in the Eiffel Tower. The bridge is constructed using corrosion-resistant materials to withstand weather variations, high wind speeds and tides, along with natural phenomena like earthquakes and cyclones. It can withstand earthquakes up to 6.5 magnitude, thus giving the lifespan of the bridge to remain intact for over a century. The 70 spans of Orthotropic Steel Decks (OSDs) with lengths ranging from 65 to 180 metres and weighing up to 2,800 metric tons were erected across the Thane Creek using Japanese technology

In addition, a Comprehensive Surveillance System (CSS) utilizes a network of high-definition CCTV cameras strategically placed along the entire route. The Speed Violation Detection System (SVDS) has been installed to enforce speed limits and ensure enhanced road safety for commuters. A Video Incident Detection System (VIDS) that promptly detects and responds to incidents and mishaps has been installed. There are Emergency Calling Boxes (ECBs) on the bridge to provide commuters with a direct communication link to emergency services. Also, Variable Message Display (VMD) systems have been installed to effectively communicate and provide real-time information to commuters.

=== Environmental safety and Sustainability measures ===
The roads on both sides of the bridge have been paved with stone mastic asphalt (SMA) The bridge is paved with stone matrix asphalt, which has a high percentage of crushed, durable stone aggregates and a specialised asphalt binder. SMA increases the pavement life by 20–30% because of its high resistance to variations in temperature, better adhesion between the stone aggregate and bitumen, reduces traffic noise, has high skid resistance and enhances road surface marking visibility. The surface will remain completely smooth and intact, irrespective of weather conditions. The SMA pavements will be 100% recyclable at the end of their service life, thus keeping the environment free of pollution. The carbon footprint from vehicular emissions will also significantly reduce by a few hundred thousand tons, as vehicles will be crossing the bridge at a maximum speed limit of 100 km/h (62 mph).

Environmentalists were concerned that the lighting on the bridge would disturb marine life at night. To solve the issue, engineers have installed 1,212 special light poles that will illuminate only the carriageways, without any luminous spill onto the sea, thus positively affecting the marine life. These eco-friendly and sustainability measures have earned the bridge and the MMRDA a sustainability certificate from the Bombay Natural History Society (BNHS).

== Cost ==
The cost of the MTHL has increased several times. In 2005, the cost of the project was estimated at ₹4,000 crore (equivalent to ₹150 billion or US$1.6 billion in 2026). The cost was revised to ₹6000 crore in 2008. It was then increased to ₹8800 crore in November 2011 and to ₹9360 crore in August 2012. The MMRDA re-evaluated the cost project as about ₹11,000 crore (US$1.2 billion) at 2014 prices. In April 2017, the project cost was estimated at ₹17,843 crore (US$1.9 billion), which includes ₹70 crore compensation to fishermen, ₹45 crore for installing noise barriers after opening the sea link, a ₹25 crore deposit as seed money to mangrove fund, another ₹25 crore for a compensatory mangrove restoration plan, and a mandatory expenditure of at least ₹335 crore for an "environment management programme". In July 2017, the MMRDA announced that it would provide a one-time payment of ₹5.68 lakh (US$6,100) to each fisherman affected by the project. The agency received over 3,000 claims for compensation, and it awarded payments to genuine claimants after screening the claims. The MMRDA paid a total compensation of ₹380 crore (US$41 million) to fishermen affected by the project throughout the construction period.

JICA funded 85% of the total cost through a loan at a concessional rate of Yen-London Interbank Offered Rate plus 0.1% for the project activities, and 0.01% for consulting services, with a 30-year repayment period, including a 10-year grace period. JICA and the MMRDA signed the agreement to disburse the first tranche of the loan on 31 March 2017. The first tranche of ₹7,912 crore (US$850 million) was about 45% of the total project cost. The second tranche of ₹4,262 crore (US$460 million) was extended on 27 March 2020, and the third tranche of ₹1,297 crore (US$140 million) was extended on 3 March 2023. The MMRDA bore 1.2% of the project cost, and the remaining amount was borne by the state government. The MMRDA allocated ₹1,200 crore (US$130 million) towards the project in its budget for the 2017–18 fiscal. The MMRDA stated that it had spent ₹135.6 crore (US$14 million) to reduce the environmental impact of the MTHL construction in August 2021.

Before the submission of bids for the project, the MMRDA estimated the project cost at ₹14,137 crore (US$1.5 billion). The actual contract for the project was awarded to three bidders at a combined cost of ₹14,262 crore (US$1.5 billion) in November 2017. MMRDA officials stated that they expected the cost to reduce by 6% as a result of the Union Government's decision to lower the goods and services tax (GST) for construction work from 18% to 12%. The revised cost of the contract would now be ₹13,400 crore (US$1.4 billion). The COVID-19 pandemic caused delays to construction which escalated the project cost by around 5–15%. The total cost of the MTHL was estimated as ₹17,843 crore (US$1.9 billion) in September 2021. Cost escalation also occurred because of design changes caused by the location of underground utilities, which were different from what planners had assumed.

== Connectivity ==
The MTHL has three interchanges at Sewri, Shivajinagar in Ulwe, and Chirle.

=== Sewri interchange ===
The MMRDA has constructed a 1.5 km long cloverleaf interchange on a 27-acre plot, leased from the Mumbai Port Trust, located east of Sewri railway station. The loop consists of two lanes branching out from the MTHL and connecting with the Eastern Freeway, the at-grade Messant Road, and the proposed Sewri–Worli elevated road. The Sewri–Worli elevated road will provide onward connectivity to the Coastal Road (at Worli Seaface), Rafi Ahmed Kidwai Marg, and Acharya Donde Marg.

==== Sewri–Worli connector ====
The Sewri–Worli connector, also called Sewri–Worli elevated corridor (SWEC), will connect the Bandra–Worli Sea Link and the under-construction Coastal Road with the MTHL. It will be a four-lane, 17 metre-wide and 4.512 km-long cable-stayed bridge, with a height of 27 metres. The Sewri–Worli connector will begin at Sewri (East), and cross the Eastern Freeway, the Harbour Line, Rafi Ahmed Kidwai Marg, Acharya Donde Marg, the existing flyover at Ambedkar Road, Elphinstone Bridge in Parel, and the flyover at Senapati Bapat Marg before passing through Kamgar Nagar and Dr. Annie Besant Road, and terminating at Narayan Hardikar Marg at Worli. Ramps will connect the Sewri–Worli elevated corridor with Rafi Ahmed Kidwai Marg, west of Sewri railway station, and with Acharya Donde Marg at Mumbai Port Trust.

The Sewri–Worli connector was first proposed by the MMRDA in 2012–2013. The project was estimated to cost ₹517 crore (equivalent to ₹901 crore or US$96 million in 2026), and to be completed in four years. The MMRDA received bids from 5 companies to construct the Sewri–Worli connector. They were Simplex Infrastructures Ltd., Larsen & Toubro, Hindustan Construction Company (HCC), Gammon India, and the National Construction Company (NCC). Simplex Infrastructures Ltd. quoted the lowest bid (nearly 16–17% below the estimated cost of the project), followed by Larsen & Toubro (14% below the reserve price). In April 2016, DNA reported that the project had been cancelled, after previously being put "on hold" in 2015. No budgetary allocation was made for the project in the 2015–16 fiscal year, and the MMRDA had no future plans to construct the connector. The agency floated tenders again in 2017 at an estimated cost of ₹1,276 crore (US$140 million). Apart from delays, the cost increase was also the result of some major design changes. The proposed connector will be built with a steel superstructure instead of cement as per the original plan. The MMRDA also proposed additional ramps to link the Sewri–Worli connector with Dr Rafi Ahmed Kidwai Marg, west of Sewri railway station, and with Acharya Donde Marg at Mumbai Port Trust. Further, the agency will demolish the existing single-tier road over bridge at Prabhadevi railway station and replace it with a new two-tier road over bridge. The agency later paused plans for the connector due to delays with the MTHL project.

The MMRDA floated new tenders for the project in July 2020. The project received clearance from the Maharashtra Coastal Zone Management Authority (MCZMA) on 7 July 2020, and from the Maharashtra State Environment Impact Assessment Authority (SEIAA) on 8 September 2020. J. Kumar Infraprojects Ltd. was awarded the contract to build the Sewri–Worli connector in November 2020. The project is estimated to cost ₹1,051.86 crore (US$110 million). Construction began on 13 January 2021. The then Chief Minister of Maharashtra, Uddhav Thackeray, laid the foundation stone for the project on 21 February 2021. 25.77% of work on the project was completed by November 2022. As of January 2024, 50% of work has been completed. It is expected to open by the end of 2024.

=== Shivajinagar interchange ===
The Shivajinagar interchange connects the MTHL with the Navi Mumbai International Airport, Jawaharlal Nehru Port, and local roads. It has been built to connect Ulwe directly to the MTHL through the planned Ulwe Coastal Road. Once the planned road is constructed, it will join this interchange at Shivajinagar.

=== Chirle interchange ===
The Chirle interchange connects the MTHL with the Mumbai–Pune Expressway, and also provides connectivity to JNPT and Panvel. By joining the NH-348 at this point, it connects the MTHL with the expressway. But, to establish a direct link with the expressway, to decrease the increasing traffic demand and congestion to and from Pune, the MTHL will be extended from this interchange to link with it near the under-construction Navi Mumbai International Airport, which is also proposed to be connected with the help of an airport connector road.

=== Mumbai-Pune Expressway connector ===
A new Chirle-Bhatanpada corridor or Atal Setu Connector is under-construction for connecting Mumbai-Pune Expressway and bypassing Navi Mumbai traffic.

== Toll ==
In 2012, the MMRDA proposed tolls for the MTHL as ₹175 for cars, ₹265 for light commercial vehicles, ₹525 for buses and trucks, and ₹790 for multi-axle vehicles. JICA, the primary source of funding for the project, proposed higher tolls in 2016. The toll rates levied after the project opened was expected to be much higher due to cost escalations. In January 2024, after the opening of the MTHL, the Government of Maharashtra revised the toll rates from former rates as ₹ 200 for cars for one way from Mumbai to Navi Mumbai, a reduction from the initial plans of ₹ 500 and ₹ 250, and ₹ 300 from Navi Mumbai to Mumbai for return journeys, ₹ 320 and ₹ 480 for buses, ₹ 655 and ₹ 985 for light commercial vehicles (LCVs), ₹ 715 and ₹ 1075 for trucks, ₹ 1030 and ₹ 1545 for heavy-duty trucks and ₹ ₹ 1255 and ₹ 1885 for oversized vehicles. All vehicles are allowed to travel through the bridge, except two-wheelers, tractors, small, very light to light commercial vehicles and auto-rickshaws. The toll rates will be consistently decreased further over time as the MTHL caters to more vehicles.

The toll collection is done with an Open road tolling (ORT) system, present on the Navi Mumbai side of the bridge, which does not involve the stopping of vehicular movement at a toll booth and manually collecting tolls. Instead, specialized cameras installed under a shed scan vehicles passing through without having to halt, and automatically obtain tolls. Such a system not only helps commuters to be free of traffic and congestion, but also eliminates long queues, risk of mishaps, reduces pollution and the risk of un-organized collection of tolls, and ensures free flow of traffic, fuel efficiency, low carbon footprint and other benefits. The MMRDA has stated that tolls will be collected till 2045.

== See also ==
- List of longest bridges above water in India
- List of longest bridges
- Vikhroli-Koparkhairane Link Road
- Vashi Bridge
- Airoli Bridge
- Sion Panvel Highway
- Bandra–Worli Sea Link
