= Vikhroli-Koparkhairane Link Road =

Proposed motorway in Mumbai

Vikhroli-Kopar Khairane Link Road
- Carries: Highway
- Crosses: Thane Creek
- Locale: Mumbai Metropolitan Region, India
- Other name: JVLR-Kopar Khairane-Ghansoli Bridge
- Owner: MMRDA

Characteristics
- No. of lanes: 3X3 (6 lanes)

History
- Construction cost: Estimated around ₹ 550 to 1200 crores

The Vikhroli-Kopar Khairane Link Road (VKLR), also known as the JVLR-Kopar Khairane-Ghansoli Bridge, is a proposed 7.5 km to 10 km, freeway grade road bridge connecting the Indian city of Mumbai with Navi Mumbai, its satellite city. The new link road would start at Eastern Express Highway (EEH) where Jogeshwari–Vikhroli Link Road (JVLR) ends in Vikhroli, then cross Thane Creek and Harbour railway line and will terminate at Kopar Khairane in Navi Mumbai before ending on Thane-Belapur Road. The link would be a six-lane road of about 10 km in length including a 2-kilometre-long (1.2 mi) bridge over the Thane Creek. At present motorists have to take either the Vashi Bridge or Mulund–Airoli Link Road to go to Navi Mumbai and Pune. The new road will help motorists save time and fuel. The project is estimated to cost around ₹ 550 to 1200 crore. Mumbai Metropolitan Region Development Authority (MMRDA) appointed N P Bridging (Belgian company), as designing consultants for the project, which was supposed to submit the final report on the link road by mid-September 2016.

== Significance ==
It will be the fourth bridge over the Thane Creek, the other three being the Vashi Bridge connecting Mankhurd to Vashi, the Airoli Bridge connecting Mulund to Airoli, and the Kalwa Bridge connecting Thane and Kalwa. The Navi Mumbai-end provides for a seamless corridor for travelling to Thane, Dombivli, Kalyan, Panvel (which is itself now a node of Navi Mumbai), & Ambarnath and beyond besides throwing open a direct corridor with the new Navi Mumbai International Airport in the Ulwe node of Navi Mumbai. It will mean easier access for residents of Ghatkopar, Powai, Vikhroli, and Bhandup. The connector will lead to a real estate boom, as travel time will reduce by about an hour.

People travelling from the western suburbs to the eastern suburbs will benefit the most. Connectivity of Mumbai to the proposed Navi Mumbai International Airport will be improved. The bridge will have ramp connectivity on the Eastern Express Highway, with a city connect on the Thane–Belapur Road. Motorists can navigate further towards nodal visits, or drive down further towards Panvel in Navi Mumbai city, as the Thane-Belapur Road] meets the Sion Panvel Highway, or even wend their way onto the Palm Beach Marg.

Further, the link road will allow a 70 km shortcut for local commuters travelling to Alibag, and also benefit the Jawaharlal Nehru Port Trust, in Navi Mumbai, in terms of logistic and transport of goods. This bridge also plays an important role in connecting with the southern parts of MMR Region including Pen, Rasayani.

== Timeline ==
1. The MMRDA chalked out a plan to build the 10-km link road that will pass over Thane Creek and the dumping ground at Kanjurmarg, Bhandup. This road was originally proposed to start at Ghatkopar, passing through Kanjurmarg as the Ghatkopar-Kopar Khairane Link Road. It had, in November 2013, appointed NP Bridging, a Belgium-based firm, to design the link road over Thane Creek between the existing Vashi Bridge and Airoli Bridge. The study approximately costs ₹7.5 crores.

2. MMRDA then sought the BMC’s permission to start construction on the dumping ground at Kanjurmarg. The BMC denied the permission. According to them, an elevated road cannot be constructed over the dumping ground area, as the garbage heap can pile up to 35 metres.

3. Keeping in mind the effective dispersal of traffic coming from Jogeshwari–Vikhroli Link Road and the constraint of construction at Kanjurmarg in Bhandup, the plan was changed to construct the link road from Eastern Express Highway (EEH), where the Jogeshwari–Vikhroli Link Road ends.

4. Engineers from the NP Bridging were invited to design the realligment of the link road from Ghatkopar to Vikhroli. They were supposed to submit the final report on the link road by mid-September 2016.

== See also ==
- Jogeshwari–Vikhroli Link Road
- Mumbai Trans Harbour Link
- Airoli Bridge
- Vashi Bridge
- Sion Panvel Expressway
- Bandra–Worli Sea Link
- Navi Mumbai International Airport
