= Thane Creek =

Thane Creek ठाणे खाडी
- Creek
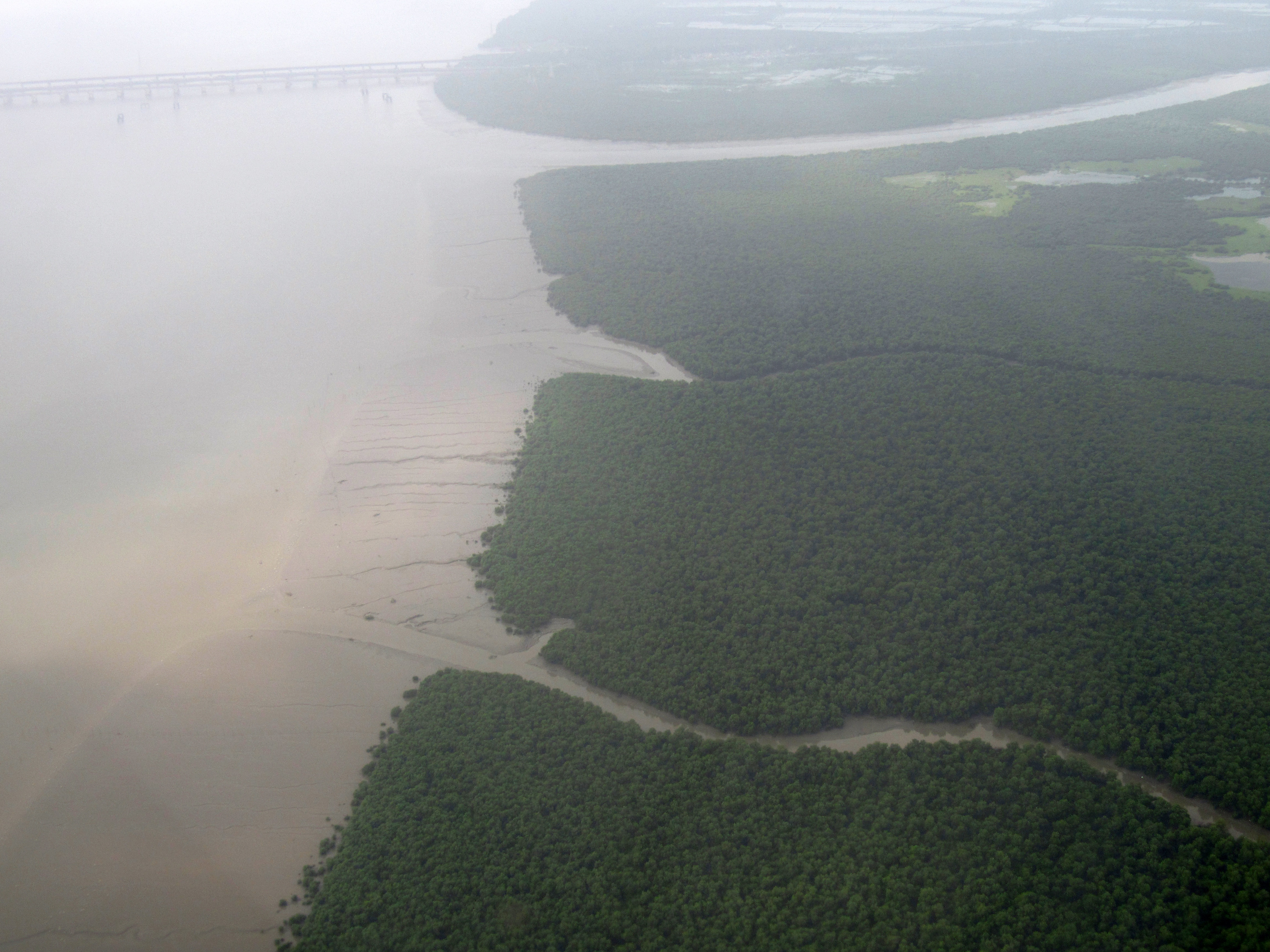
- Thane Creek

- Location within Maharashtra
- Coordinates: 19.02°N 72.97°E
- Country: India
- State: Maharashtra
- District, Metro: Thane, Mumbai
- Named for: Thane

Languages
  - Official: Marathi
- Time zone: UTC+5:30 (IST)

Designations

Ramsar Wetland
- Official name: Thane Creek
- Designated: 13 April 2022
- Reference no.: 2490

Thane Creek, previously Thana Creek, is an estuary of the Arabian Sea and one of the two main distributaries of the Ulhas River, in the Konkan division of Maharashtra. The Ulhas splits at the northeast corner of Salsette Island into its two main distributaries, the other one being Vasai Creek, both of which empty into the Arabian Sea. The creek forms the eastern boundary of Salsette island and separates the island from mainland of Konkan. It gets its name from the city of Thane, previously Thana, located on the eastern bank of the creek.

The region of the Thane Creek has been recognized as an Important Bird Area by the Bombay Natural History Society, as it is home to various avian species. In particular, it harbors populations of flamingos and several other migratory and wading birds. The area has been designated as a protected Ramsar site since 2022.

== Thane Creek Flamingo Sanctuary ==
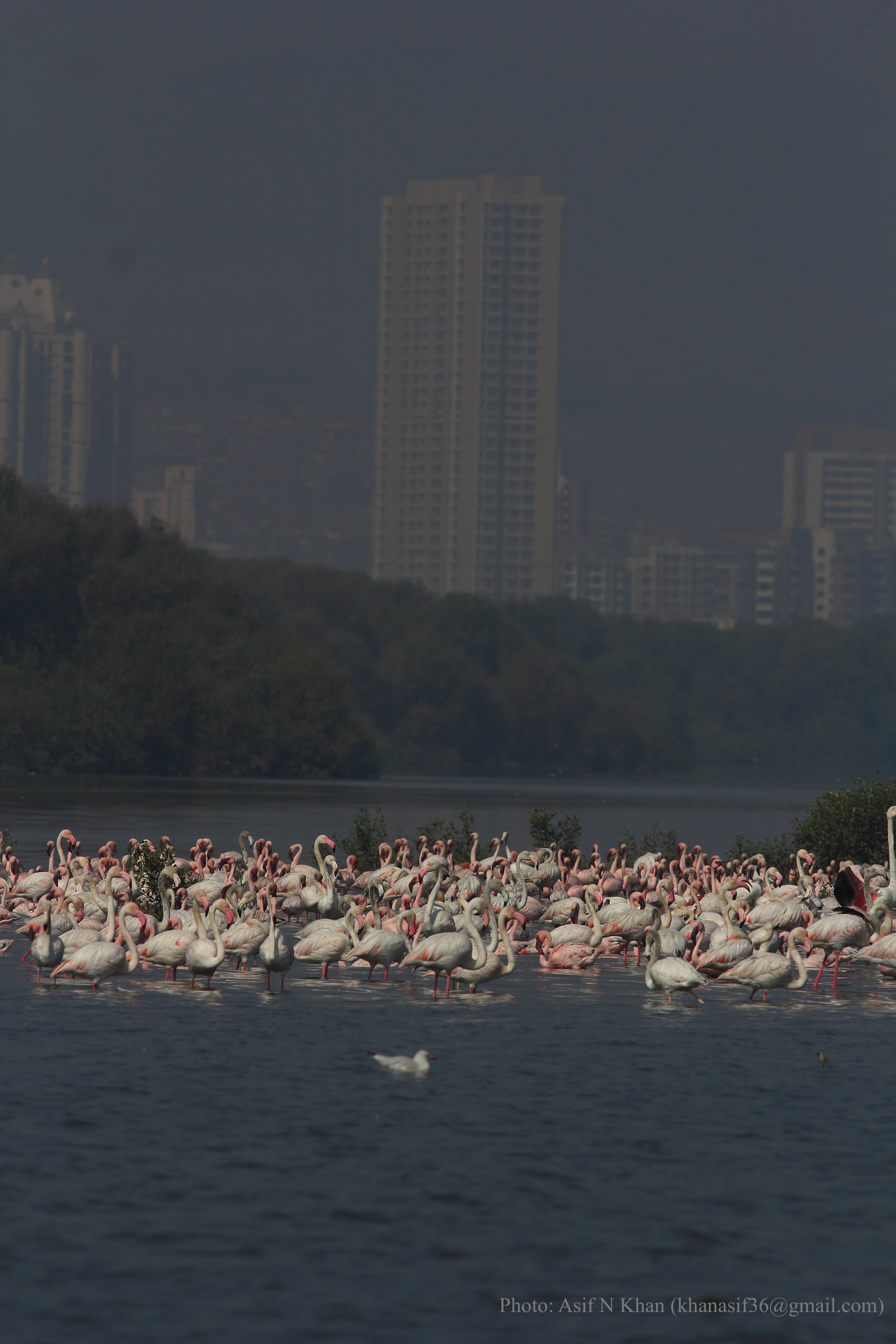
Thane Creek Flamingo Sanctuary

The Maharashtra Government has declared the area along the western bank of the Thane Creek as the Thane Creek Flamingo Sanctuary (TCFS). It is Maharashtra's second notified marine sanctuary after the Malvan Marine Sanctuary. The sanctuary was notified by the Govt. Gazette on 6 August 2015.

The TCFS lies on the Central Asian Flyway of the Asia Pacific Global Migratory Flyway. In 2022, the teams of Bombay Natural History Society (BNHS) counted more than 130,000 flamingoes in Thane creek. The greater flamingo and lesser flamingo are the two flamingo species present in the sanctuary. Alongside the flamingoes, there are 167 species of birds and small mammals, like golden jackals are also present.

The total area of the TCFS is 16.9 square kilometres (1,690 ha) [which includes 8.96 square kilometres (896 ha) of mangrove forests and 7.94 square kilometres (794 ha) of water body].

== Islands ==
Numerous islands are located in Thane Creek such as Elephanta Island, Butcher Island and an unnamed island between Thane and Kalwa.

== Railway bridges ==
Tanna railway viaducts
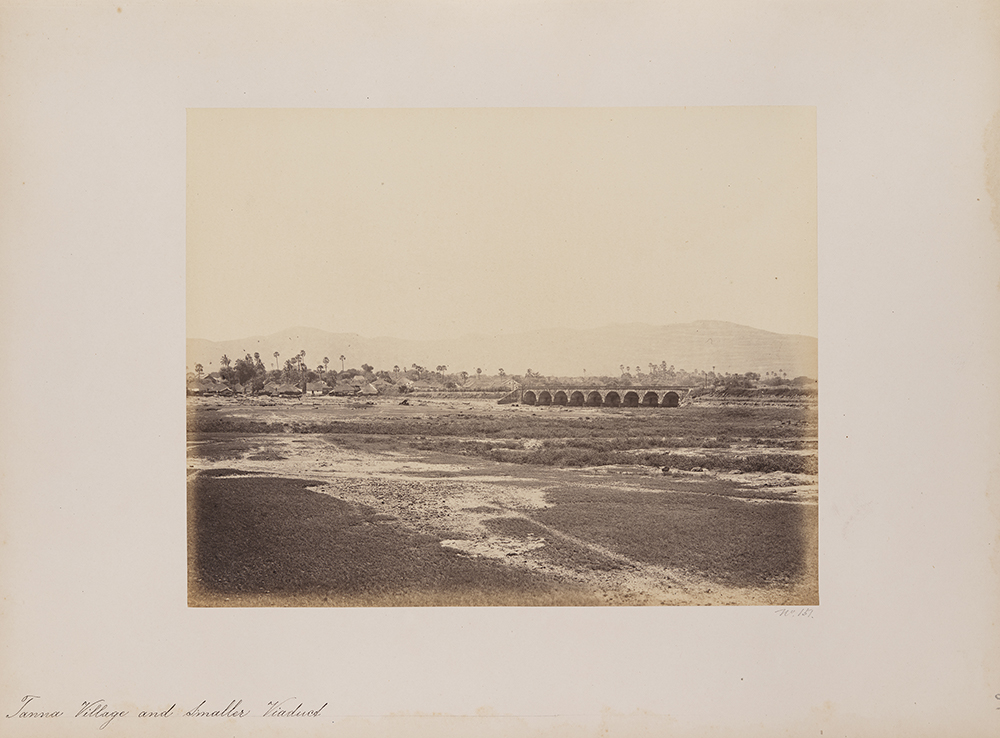
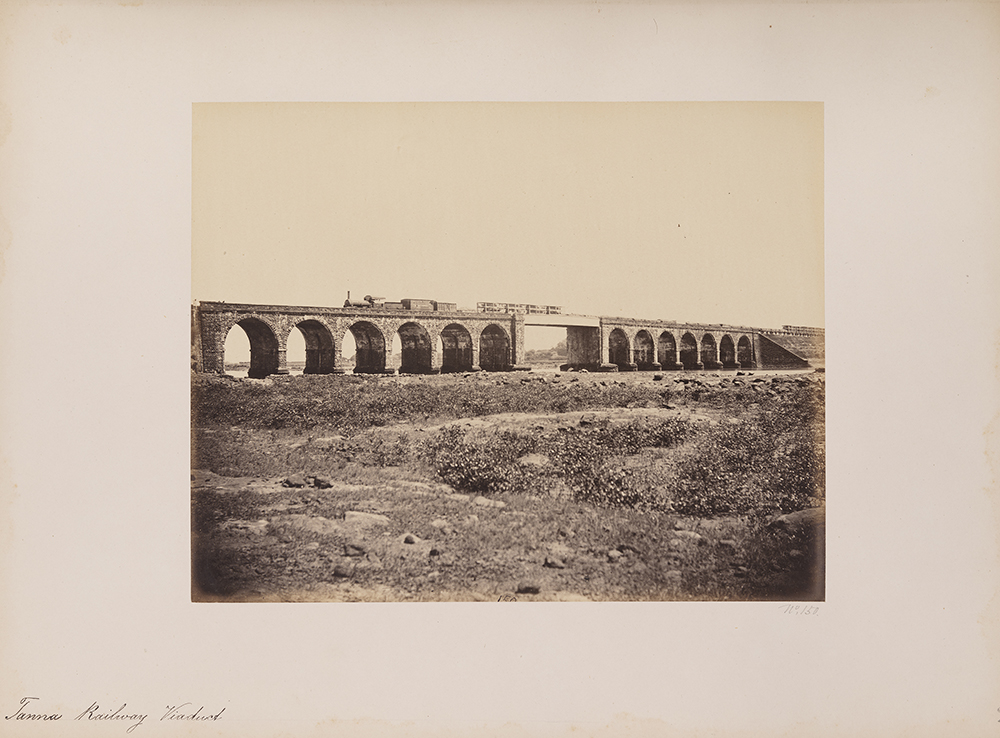
The smaller railway viaduct (top) and the longer railway viaduct (bottom) near Tanna (present day Thane) in 1855

Thane railway bridge or Thane railway viaduct is the oldest rail bridge constructed on this creek. The bridge lies between Thane and Parsik tunnel, Kalwa. It has two sections, as there is an island in middle, a smaller section built of stones and concrete and a longer section built of stone and concrete but with a steel girder in middle. The first railway bridges in the country, they were built over Thane Creek when the Mumbai-Thane line was extended to Kalyan in May 1854. A report from Bombay Times elaborately describing the route for an account of a first trial journey of 18 November 1852 between Bombay and Tannah (before the official opening on 16 April 1853) also gave details on the Tannah-Callian (today, Kalyan) section, then under construction. It said that the railway [route] bent quickly towards 'the viaduct' on entering the village. This refers to the two old Thane creek bridges, that spanned the creek on the original line.

A new parallel railway bridge, also with two sections, has been constructed for local trains , on the harbour line of Mumbai suburban railway.

Another railway bridge connecting Mankhurd and Vashi was opened later.

== Road bridges ==
There are numerous road bridges over Thane Creek.

The first Kalwa Bridge (19°11′49″N 72°59′08″E) was built in 1863 and was first road bridge across Thane creek. The 350 m (1,150 ft) long bridge has ten pillars and ten arches. Following a structural audit conducted on the bridge in 2010, it was deemed unsafe for use by heavy vehicles, and only two and three-wheelers were permitted to use the bridge. According to officials the bridge's structure had suffered damage from a collision with a barge in 2006. The bridge was closed to all motor vehicle traffic from midnight on 3 August 2016, and only pedestrians were permitted to use the bridge. The bridge will not be demolished as it is classified as a heritage structure.

The second Kalwa Bridge was opened in 1995. The third Kalwa Bridge was partially opened to traffic on 13 November 2022, and was fully opened on 10 March 2023.

Airoli bridge connects Mulund and Airoli. It was opened in 1999.

Vashi Bridge was built in 1973 and connected Mankhurd and Vashi. This old bridge has been closed to traffic and been replaced by a newer bridge which was opened in 1997. A third bridge is currently under construction.

Mumbai Trans Harbour Link connects Sewri and Chirle. It was opened in 2024.
