= Airoli Bridge =

Viaduct in the Mumbai area

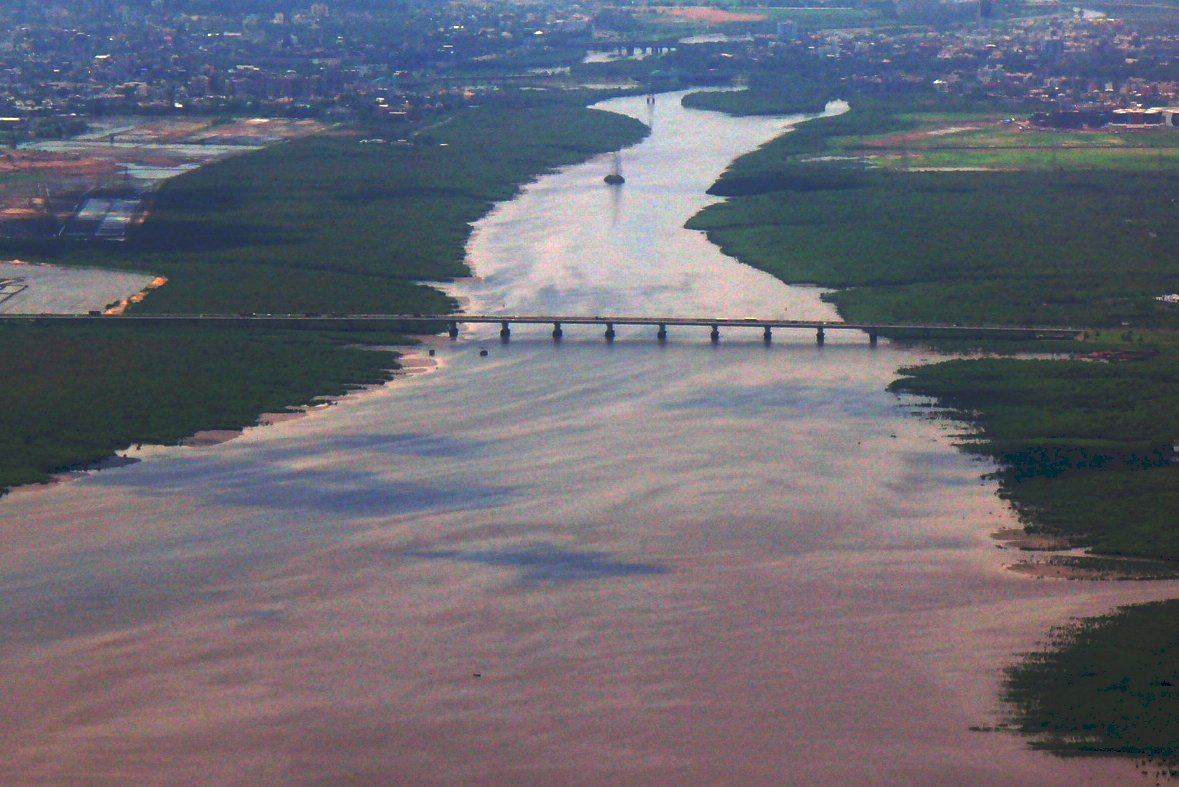
- Aerial view of Airoli Bridge
- Coordinates: 19.1507°N 72.9805°E
- Carries: Road Traffic
- Crosses: Thane Creek
- Locale: Mulund, Mumbai and Airoli, Navi Mumbai
- Official name: Airoli Bridge
- Maintained by: Maharashtra State Road Development Corporation
- Preceded by: Kalwa Bridge
- Followed by: Vashi Bridge

Characteristics
- Design: Slab and girder bridge
- Total length: 3,850 meters (12,630 ft)
- Longest span: 1,030 meters (3,379 ft)
- No. of spans: 19 spans of 50 meters c/c. Two end spans of 40 meters each. Two navigational spans

History
- Constructed by: Afcons Infrastructure
- Construction start: January 1994
- Construction end: January 1999
- Opened: 1999

Statistics
- Toll: ₹40 For Cars. Free For 2 Wheelers.

Location
- Interactive map of Airoli Bridge

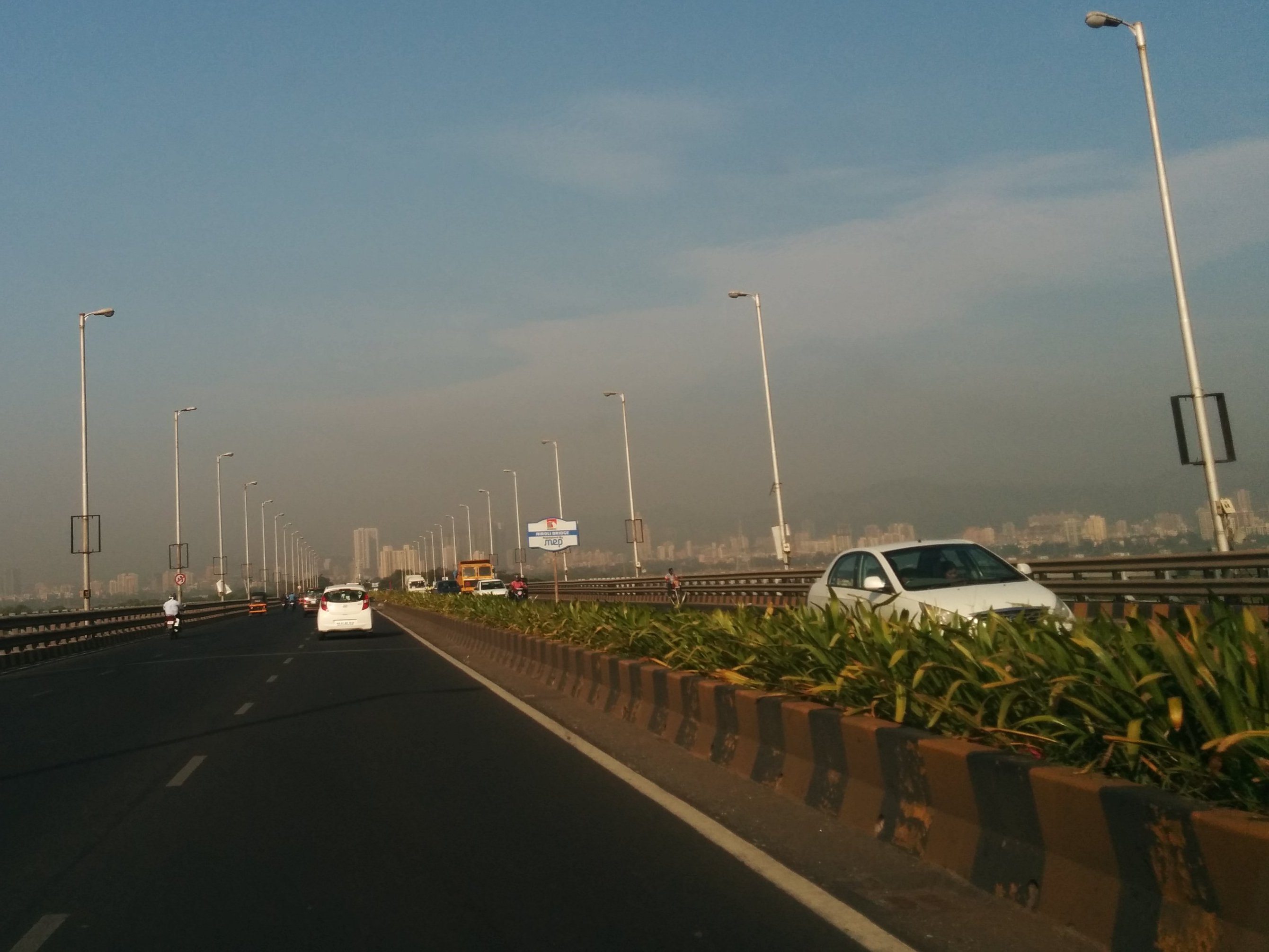
Heading west on Airoli Bridge (Mulund skyline in the background)

The Airoli Bridge is a bridge in the Mumbai Metropolitan Region of India. It was constructed to establish a direct road link between Mumbai and Navi Mumbai.

== Structure ==
Afcons Infrastructure, a subsidiary of the Shapoorji Pallonji Group, constructed the bridge. The bridge was made from 800 box girders. The 1.03 km bridge marked the development of the Airoli and Thane-Belapur belt. The MSRDC collects tolls on the bridge. The toll rates for small passenger cars is set at ₹40 & for Trucks & Buses s set at ₹130.

== Geographical significance ==
A road link connecting the Thane–Belapur Road and the Eastern Express Highway has been established by this bridge. This bridge forms a junction on the Thane – Belapur road at Airoli and meets the intersection of the Eastern Express Highway and the Goregaon–Mulund Link Road in Mumbai. This bridge is the second bridge connecting Mumbai to Navi Mumbai after the Vashi Bridge, connecting the township of Vashi to Mankhurd. It is one of the most used bridges in Mumbai, connecting Mulund to various business hubs of Navi Mumbai.

== See also ==
- Vikhroli-Koparkhairane Link Road
- Vashi Bridge
- Mumbai Trans Harbour Link
- Sion Panvel Expressway
- Bandra-Worli Sea Link
- List of longest bridges in the world
- List of longest bridges above water in India
