= Mankhurd railway station =

Railway station in Mumbai

Mankhurd

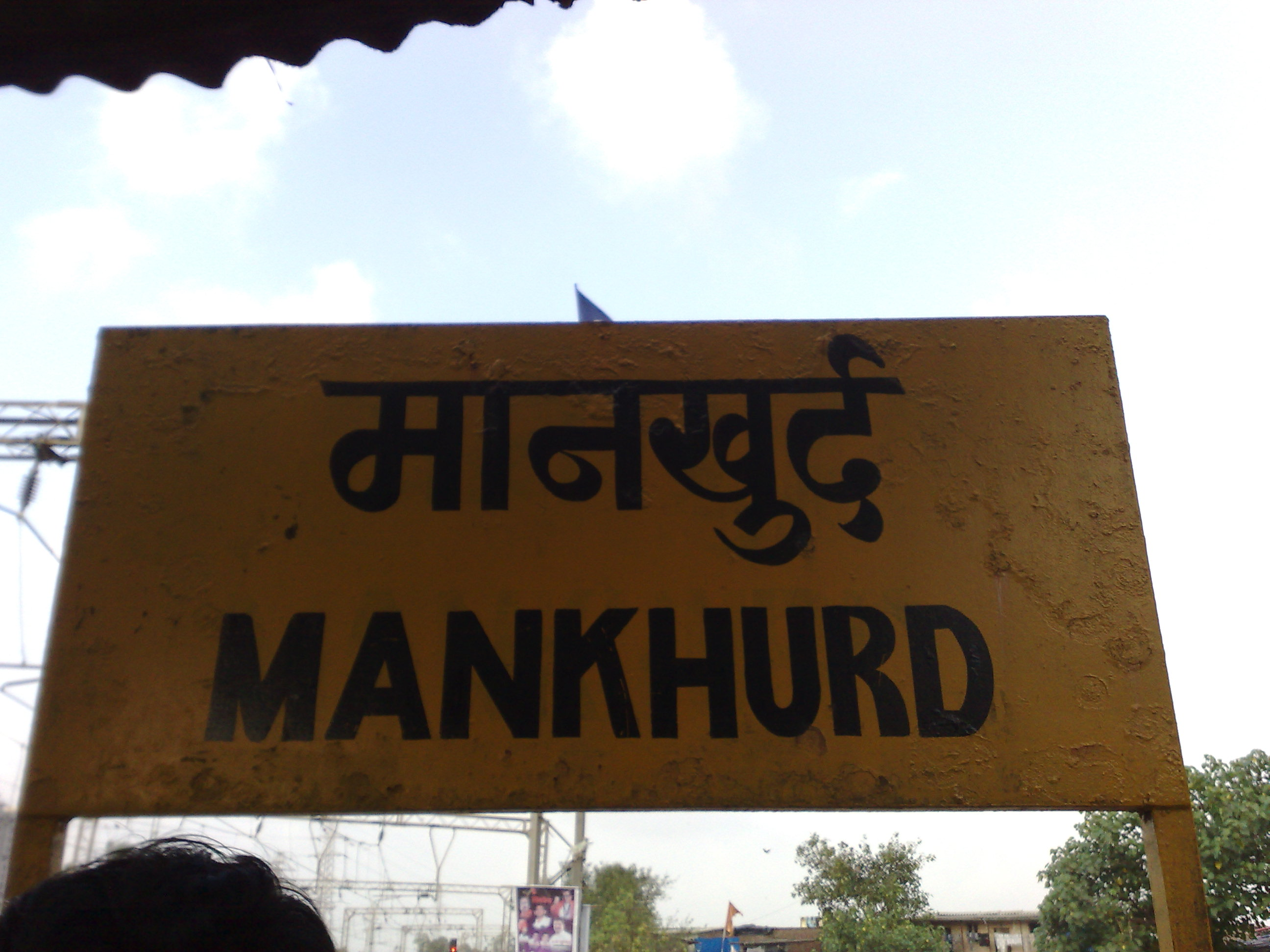

General information
- Coordinates: 19.0481°N 72.9317°E
- System: Mumbai Suburban Railway station
- Owner: Ministry of Railways, Indian Railways
- Line: Harbour Line
- Platforms: 4 (2 Retired)
- Tracks: 4 (2 Retired)
- Connections: Line 2B Line 8 Mankhurd

Construction
- Structure type: Standard on-ground station

Other information
- Status: Active
- Station code: MNKD
- Fare zone: Central Railways

Services
Preceding station	Mumbai Suburban Railway	Following station
Govandi towards Chhatrapati Shivaji Terminus	Harbour line	Vashi towards Panvel
Route map
Location
- Location within Mumbai

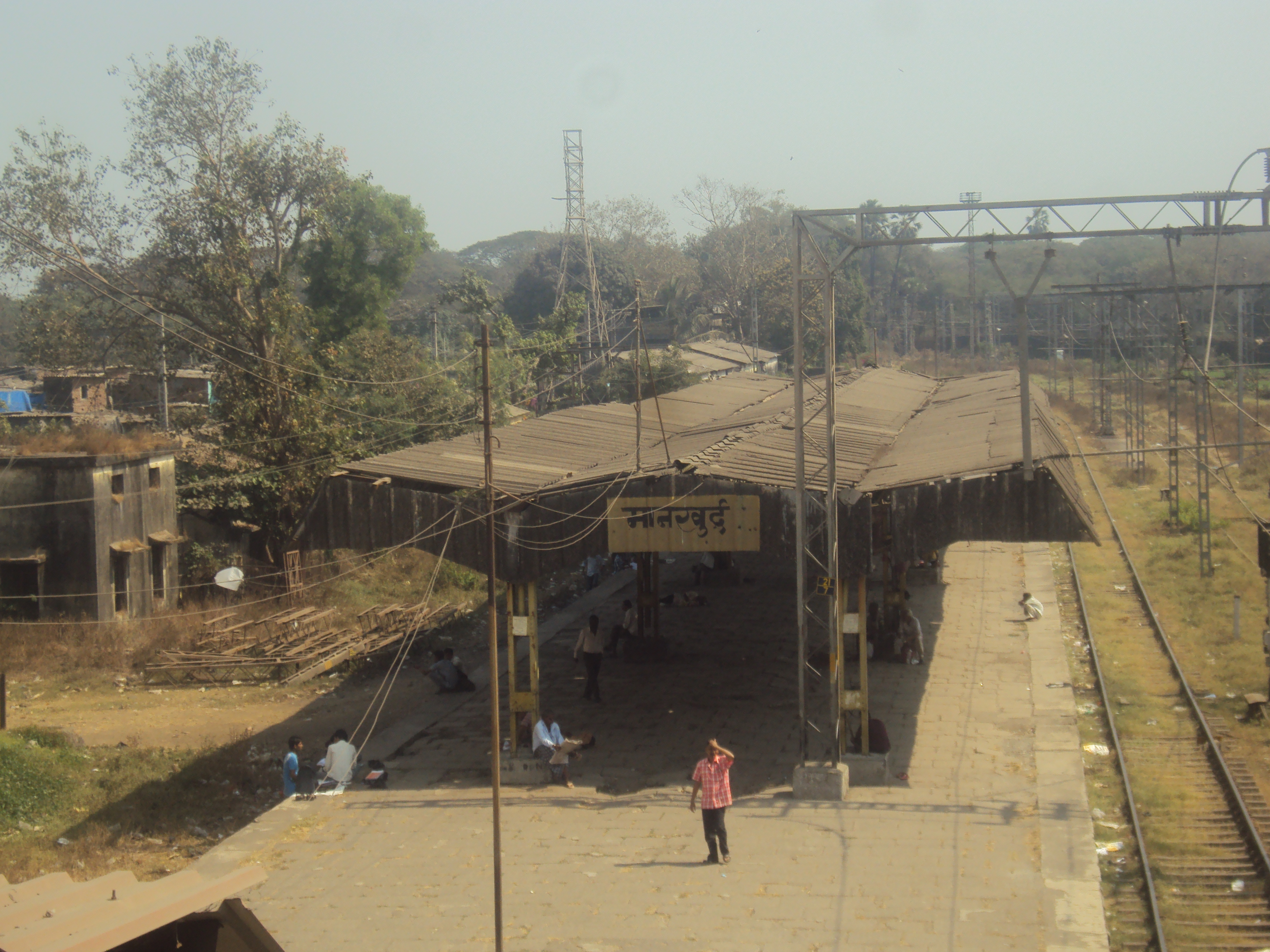
Old Mankhurd station.

Mankhurd is a railway station on the Harbour Line of the Mumbai Suburban Railway network. It is the last stop on the line on Salsette Island before leaving for Navi Mumbai on mainland Maharashtra. Bhabha Atomic Research Centre is near from Mankhurd Railway Station

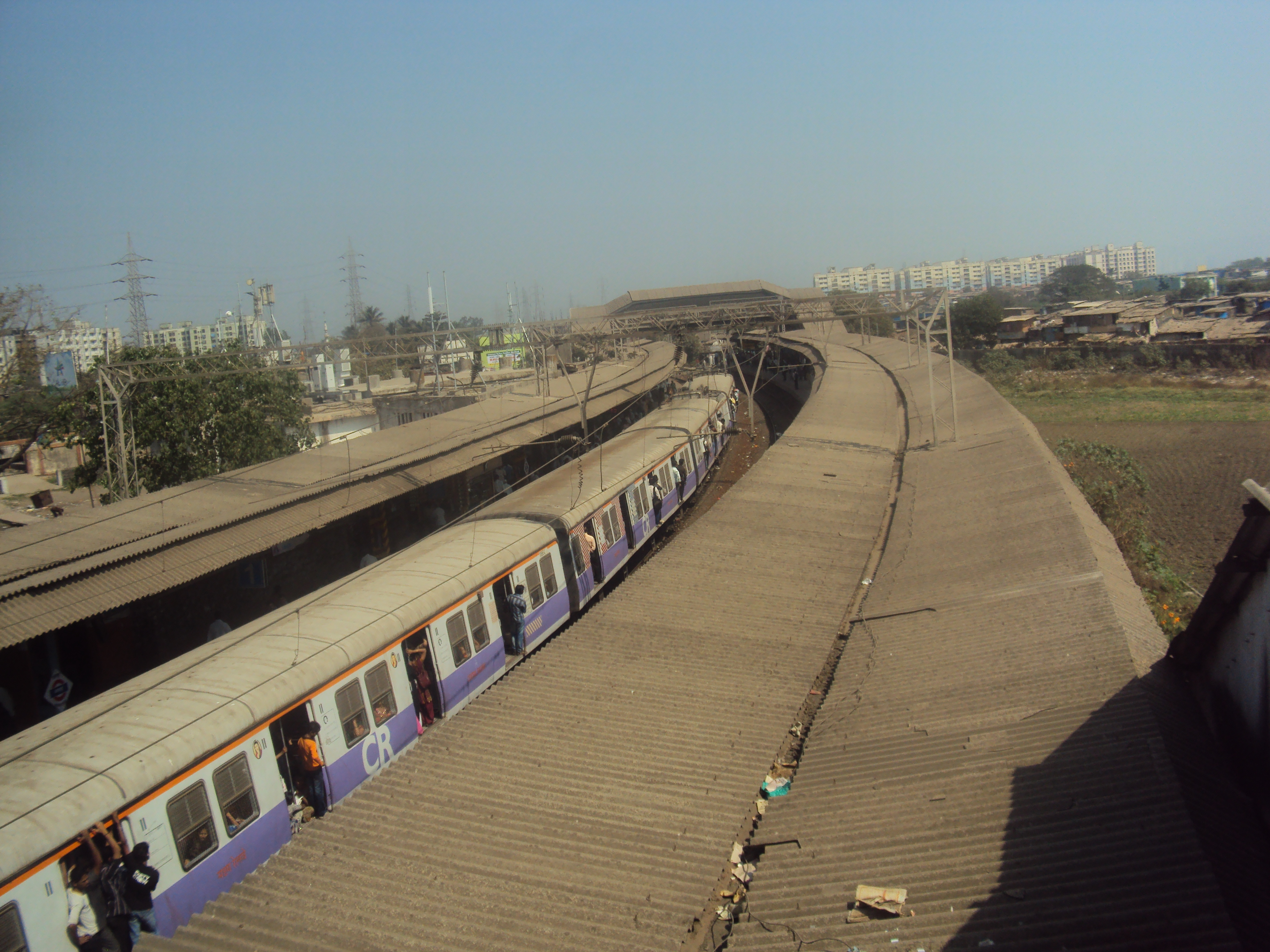
Mankhurd railway station foot overbridge view

The township lies on the Harbour Line and is the last stop in the city before Navi Mumbai. After Mankhurd, trains cross the Vashi Bridge before reaching Vashi, in Navi Mumbai. Mankhurd also has a railway line run by the Bombay Port Trust.

Unlike many of the railway stations in Mumbai, which have 'east' and 'west' sides, this station has a 'north' and 'south' side on either side of the railway track. Bhabha Atomic Research Centre's employee township "Anushakti Nagar", Naval Employee's Township, Mandala and Trombay are some nearby accessible places from the south side of this train station and P.M.G.P. Colony, Mohite-Patil Nagar, Sonapur, Mandala are some nearby accessible places from North side. BEST (Brihanmumbai Electric Supply and Transport) public buses serve this station. Metered and non-metered auto rickshaws are common sight outside the station. There is a civil colony- SPDC Colony located about 2 kilometres away from the station road.
