= Atal Setu Connector =

The Atal Setu-Mumbai-Pune Expressway Connector is a 7.35-kilometre (4.57 mi), six-lane, elevated expressway corridor being built by the Mumbai Metropolitan Region Development Authority (MMRDA) in the Indian state of Maharashtra. It will connect Chirle near Atal Setu with the Mumbai–Pune Expressway, near the Bhatan tunnel in Bhatan.There will be multiple tunnels and bridges in this corridor.
