= Kalwa Bridge =

- Carries: Motor vehicles, bicycles and pedestrians
- Crosses: Thane Creek
- Locale: Thane district, Maharashtra, India
- Begins: Thane
- Ends: Kalwa
- Other name(s): Kalwa Creek Bridge; Thane-Kalwa Creek Bridge
- Owner: Thane Municipal Corporation
- Maintained by: Thane Municipal Corporation
- Followed by: Airoli Bridge

Characteristics
- Total length: 350 m (1,150 ft) (1st bridge); 2.4 km (1.5 mi) (3rd bridge)

History
- Opened: 1863 (1st bridge); 1995 (2nd bridge); 13 November 2022 (3rd bridge)
- Closed: 3 August 2016 (1st bridge)

Kalwa Bridge is a road bridge across Thane Creek in the Mumbai Metropolitan Region, which connects the city of Thane to the Indian mainland at Kalwa. There are three separate bridges connecting Thane with Kalwa. The first Kalwa Bridge was built in 1863 and was the first bridge crossing Thane Creek. The second Kalwa Bridge was opened in 1995. The third Kalwa Bridge was partially opened to traffic on 13 November 2022, and was completed on 10 March 2023.

== History ==
The first Kalwa Bridge (19°11′49″N 72°59′08″E) was built in 1863. The 350 m (1,150 ft) long bridge has ten pillars and ten arches. Following a structural audit conducted on the bridge in 2010, it was deemed unsafe for use by heavy vehicles, and only two and three-wheelers were permitted to use the bridge. According to officials the bridge's structure had suffered damage from a collision with a barge in 2006. The bridge was closed to all motor vehicle traffic from midnight on 3 August 2016, and only pedestrians were permitted to use the bridge. The bridge will not be demolished as it is classified as a heritage structure.

The second Kalwa Bridge (19°11′49″N 72°59′08″E) was opened in 1995.

A third bridge (19°11′57″N 72°59′14″E) was proposed in 2013 to ease traffic congestion. Construction on the bridge began in 2014. The five-lane 2.4 km (1.5 mi) U-shaped bridge was built at an estimated cost of ₹183 crore (US$21 million). It begins at Creek Road and passes above Saket Road, turns right into the creek and curves on to Thane–Belapur Road. The new bridge will be used for one-way traffic towards Kalwa, while the 2nd bridge will be converted to a one-way towards Thane. Three lanes on the 3rd Kalwa Bridge were inaugurated by Maharashtra Chief Minister Eknath Shinde on 13 November 2022. A fourth lane, on the Thane Jail side of the bridge, was opened to traffic on 30 November. The fifth lane of the bridge was opened on 10 March 2023.
