= Raghuleela Mall, Vashi =

Building in India

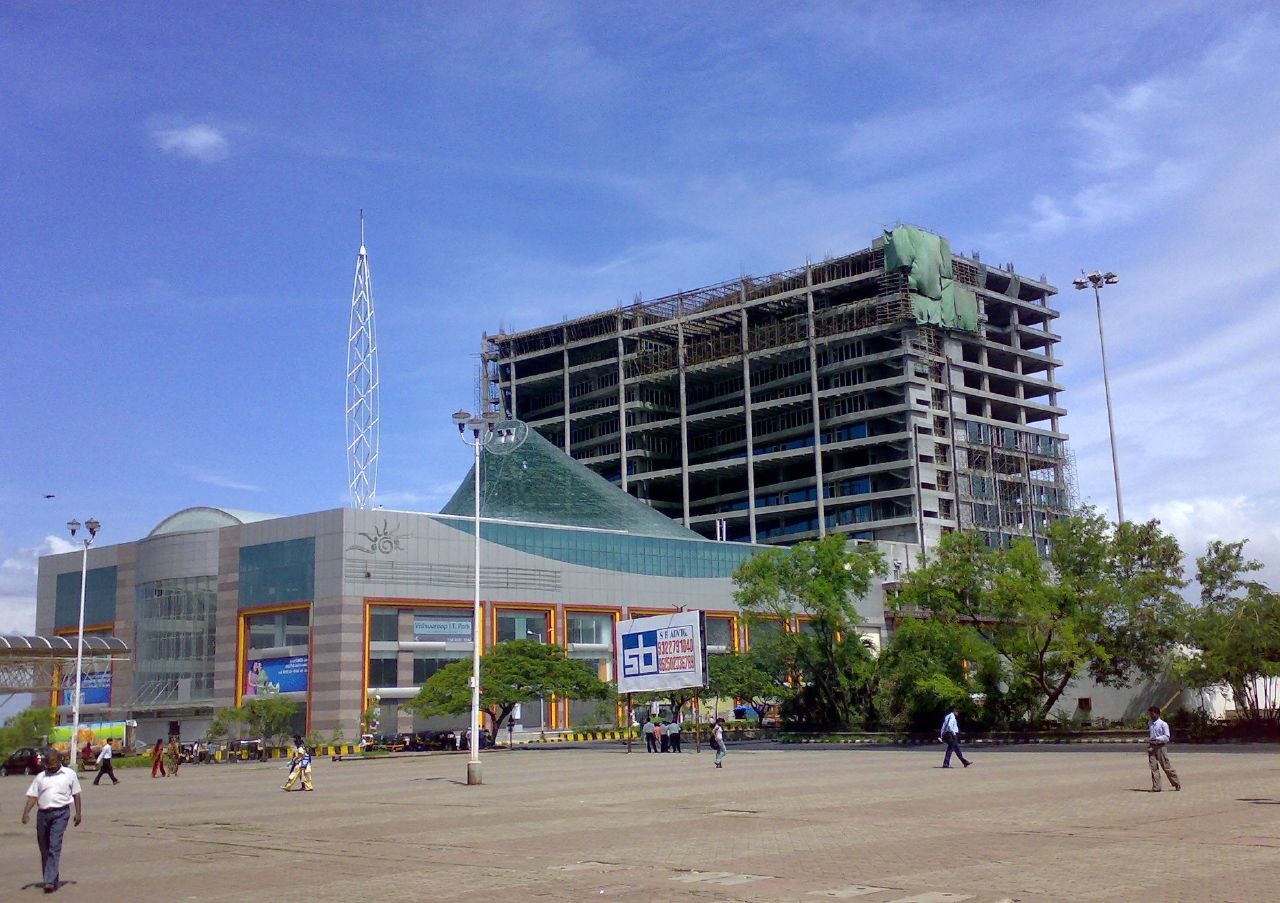
- Location: Vashi, Navi Mumbai, Maharashtra
- Developer: Raghuleela Properties Pvt. Ltd.
- Architect: Reza Kabul
- Floor area: 375,000 sq ft (34,800 m^{2})
- Floors: 4 (Excluding commercial area)
- Parking: 400 cars
- Website: www.raghuleela.co.in

Raghuleela Mall, Vashi, Navi Mumbai

Raghuleela is a mall situated in Vashi, Navi Mumbai, India. Developed by Raghuleela Properties Pvt. Ltd., Raghuleela Mall is a 4-storeyed air-conditioned mall covering an area of approximately 375,000 sq ft (34,800 m^{2}) on each floor with lifts, escalators and central staircase atrium to connect all the four levels. The mall has daily footfall of up to 30,000 shoppers.

The Wadhwa Group, which has office near to the mall has announced that it would redevelop the mall into a premium mixed use commercial development, which would incorporate retail, offices & residential areas. This has come at the time during which the mall is facing dwindling footfall due to lack of Common Area Maintenance (CAM).

The mall is expected to be demolished by late 2025, subjected to approvals with regulatory authorities and design finalization.
