= Vashi Bridge =

Bridge in India

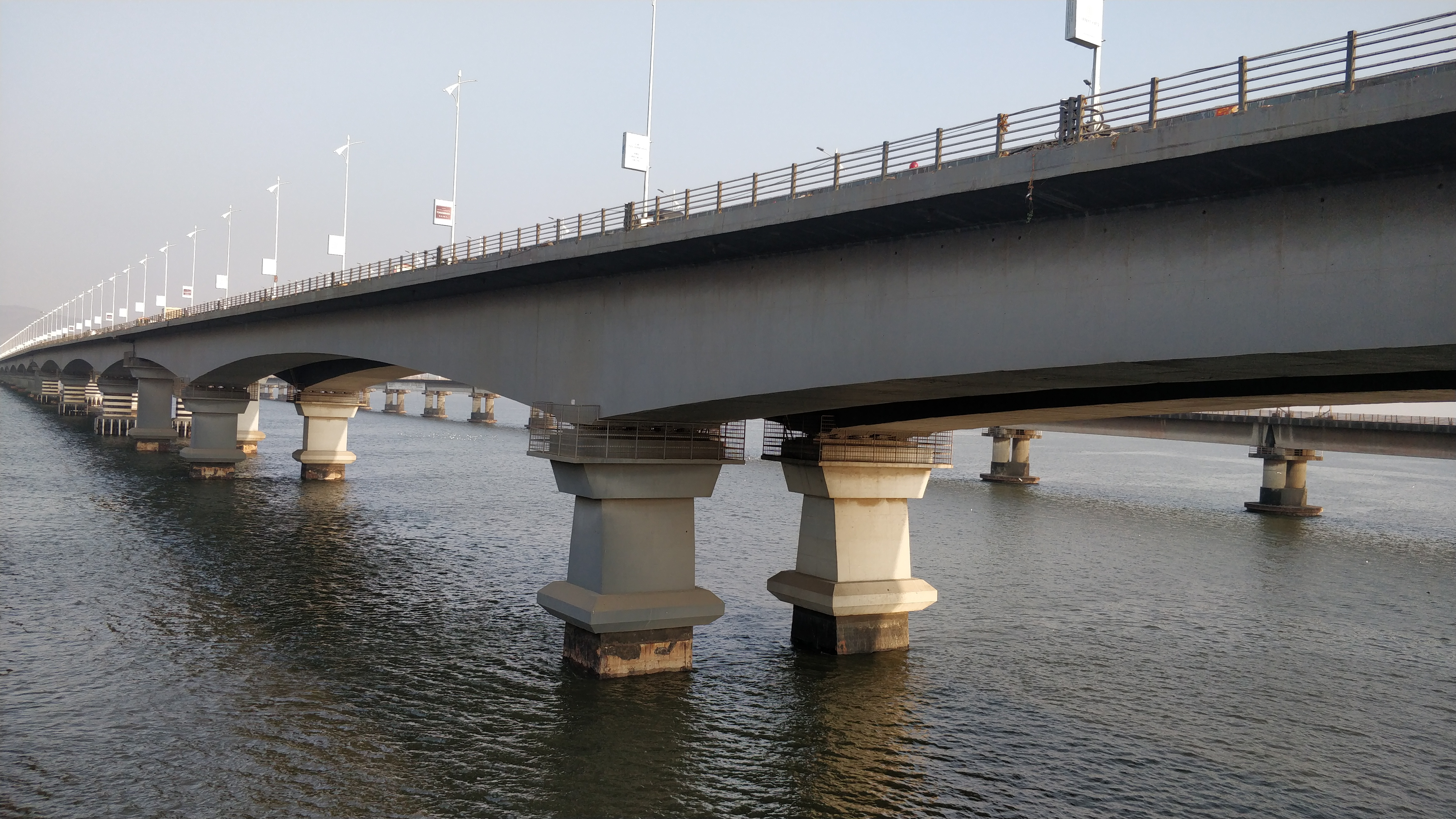
- New Vashi Bridge
- Coordinates: 19.061226°N 72.971612°E
- Carries: Sion Panvel Highway
- Crosses: Thane Creek
- Locale: Mankhurd, Mumbai; Vashi, Navi Mumbai
- Official name: Vashi Bridge
- Other name(s): Thane Creek Bridge; Second Thane Creek Bridge
- Preceded by: Airoli Bridge
- Followed by: Mumbai Trans Harbour Link

Characteristics
- Total length: 1,837.5 metres (6,029 ft)

History
- Constructed by: U. P. State Bridge Corporation Ltd.
- Opened: 1997
- Replaces: First Thane Creek Bridge

Location
- Interactive map of Vashi Bridge

The Vashi Bridge, also known as Thane Creek Bridge or the Second Thane Creek Bridge, is a road bridge across Thane Creek, which connects the city of Mumbai to the Indian mainland at Navi Mumbai. Opened in 1997, the bridge links the suburb of Mankhurd in Mumbai with Vashi in Navi Mumbai, the satellite city of Mumbai. It is one of four entry points into Mumbai (the other three being the Airoli Bridge upstream across Thane Creek, Mulund, and Dahisar), and handles traffic directed towards the region to the south and east of Mumbai.

The bridge replaces the first Thane Creek Bridge, built in 1973, which still stands to the north of the current bridge, but is closed to traffic. A third bridge is currently under construction and is expected to open in August 2024.

There is also a railway bridge to the south of both road bridges.

== History ==
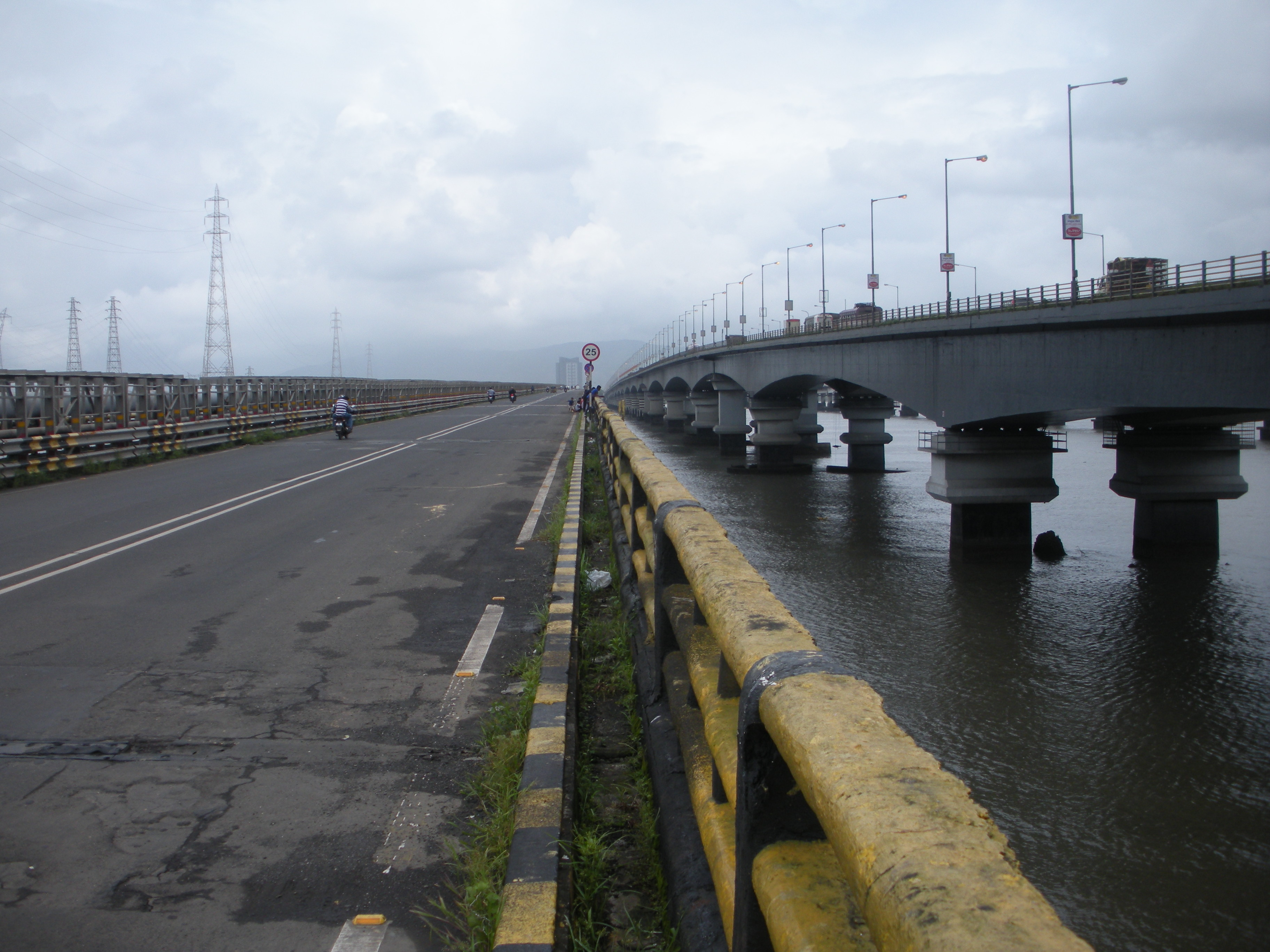
Vashi Bridges, old (TCB-1) and new (TCB-2)

=== First bridge ===
In 1959, a study group for Greater Bombay, headed by S.G. Barve, proposed constructing a rail-cum-road bridge, over the Thane Creek in order to expand industrial development areas and accommodate the.city's growing population. In the 1960s, civil engineer Adi Kanga and others proposed building Navi Mumbai to help decongest Mumbai.

The first bridge, conceived by Adi Kanga, was opened in 1973. The two-lane road bridge, named Thane Creek Bridge 1 (TCB-1) is 1,837 metres (6,027 ft) long. The bottom side of the prestressed girders of some spans developed corrosion cracks within two years of the bridge opening to traffic.This led to a series of extensive repairs, including external prestressing. The railway bridge was opened on 9 May 1992.

The first bridge is currently closed to traffic.

=== Second bridge ===
The Thane Creek Bridge 2 (TCB-2) was proposed in 1987 to replace the first bridge. The bridge was built by the U.P. State Bridge Corporation and opened to traffic in 1995. It is a box girder bridge, carrying a 6-lane dual carriageway, with a length of 1,837.35 metres (6,028.1 ft). It has several unique features in its construction and design, with emphasis on durability and a formal QA/QC programme.

Proof Consultants were appointed to oversee each aspect of planning, design and construction. Open foundations were taken into the bedrock with foundation concrete being laid in the dry, with the sea water being pumped out using submersible pumps. The piers in the intertidal zone were protected by epoxy coal tar paint painted on 6 millimetres (0.24 in) thick m.s. plate which was considered as a lost shuttering. The superstructure was a P. S. C. box girder, one for each carriageway, constructed using balanced cantilever cast-in-situ segments. It was constructed by U. P. State Bridge Corporation Ltd., and won the most outstanding concrete structure award.

NRS AS, a manufacturer specializing in comprehensive bridge construction equipment, provided the U.P. State Bridge Corporation Ltd. with a total of 12 pairs of 'BRIDGEBUILDER' FORMTRAVELER (BB FT) equipment specially designed for Free Cantilever Construction. These supplied BBFT units belonged to the 'Type II-A12-51' category, boasting impressive specifications:

- Load Capacity (Tons): 156
- Maximum Road Width (meters): 3.35
- Maximum Box Width (meters): 7.5
- Maximum Segment Length (meters): 5

=== Third bridge ===
The Thane Creek Bridge 3 (TCB-3) was proposed in 2012. It will consist of two separate 3-lane bridges constructed on either side of TCB-2. The third bridge will have a 1.837 km (1.141 mi) main span and 1.25 km (0.78 mi) of approach roads. The project will be executed by the Maharashtra State Road Development Corporation (MSRDC) and the City and Industrial Development Corporation (CIDCO), with MSRDC being the nodal agency. Larsen and Toubro was awarded the contract to build TCB-3 in September 2018.

Work was scheduled to begin in September 2018, however, it was delayed by permissions required to cut down an estimated 430 mangroves across 1.5 hectares (3.7 acres). The Bombay High Court granted permission for construction in January 2020. Works were also delayed by the COVID-19 pandemic. Construction began on 29 October 2020. Around 15% of the total project work had been completed by April 2022, and 33% by November 2022. Around 51% of the work had been completed by June 2023. The bridge was expected to open in August 2024. As of June 2025, the bridges of both the ways are thrown open to the traffic.

== Bridge locations ==
The old bridge lies just to the north of the present Vashi Bridge, and the railway bridge further south (labelled "Mankhurd Vashi Railway Bridge"), can be seen on the map.

The Airoli Bridge is further upstream across Thane Creek, while the 21.8 km (13.5 mi) Mumbai Trans Harbour Link is further south.

== See also ==
- List of longest bridges in the world
- List of longest bridges above water in India
- Vikhroli-Koparkhairane Link Road
