= Adi Kanga =

Indian civil engineer and writer

- Born: March 16, 1923; Mumbai, Maharashtra, India
- Died: April 1, 2013 (aged 90); Sydney, Australia
- Occupation: Architect
- Projects: Navi Mumbai, Vashi Bridge

Adi Kanga (March 16, 1923 – April 1, 2013) was an Indian civil engineer, writer and one of the planners of the city of Navi Mumbai. He was born on March 16, 1923, in Bombay (now Mumbai) to a Parsi family. He worked at City and Industrial Development Corporation as a general manager where he was involved in the planning and execution of Navi Mumbai city and it was he who recommended the construction of Vashi Bridge. Kanga personally drew up the plans for the New City at Vashi, on the dining table at his residence. Hand colouring the various zones of the proposed new city even before drafts men were available at CIDCO.

He was also the author of a book Number Mosaics: Journeys in Search of Universals, published in 1995. He died on April 1, 2013, in Sydney.
