= Chirle =

Village in Maharashtra, India

- Village
- Country: India
- State: Maharashtra
- District: Raigad
- Taluka: Uran
- Lok Sabha constituency: Maval
- Assembly constituency: Uran

Government
  - Type: Panchayati raj
  - Body: Gram panchayat
  - MP: Shrirang Barne (Shiv Sena)
  - MLA: Mahesh Baldi

Area
  - Total: 424 ha (1,050 acres)

Population (2011 Census)
  - Total: 3,714
  - Males: 1,924
  - Females: 1,790
- Time zone: UTC+5:30 (IST)
- Pincode: 410 206

Chirle is a village in Uran taluka of Raigad district, Maharastra.

The under-construction Mumbai Trans Harbour Link will connect Chirle with Sewri, South Mumbai. The proposed Konkan Expressway will connect Chirle with Patradevi near the Maharashtra-Goa border.
