= Airoli =

- Node of Navi Mumbai
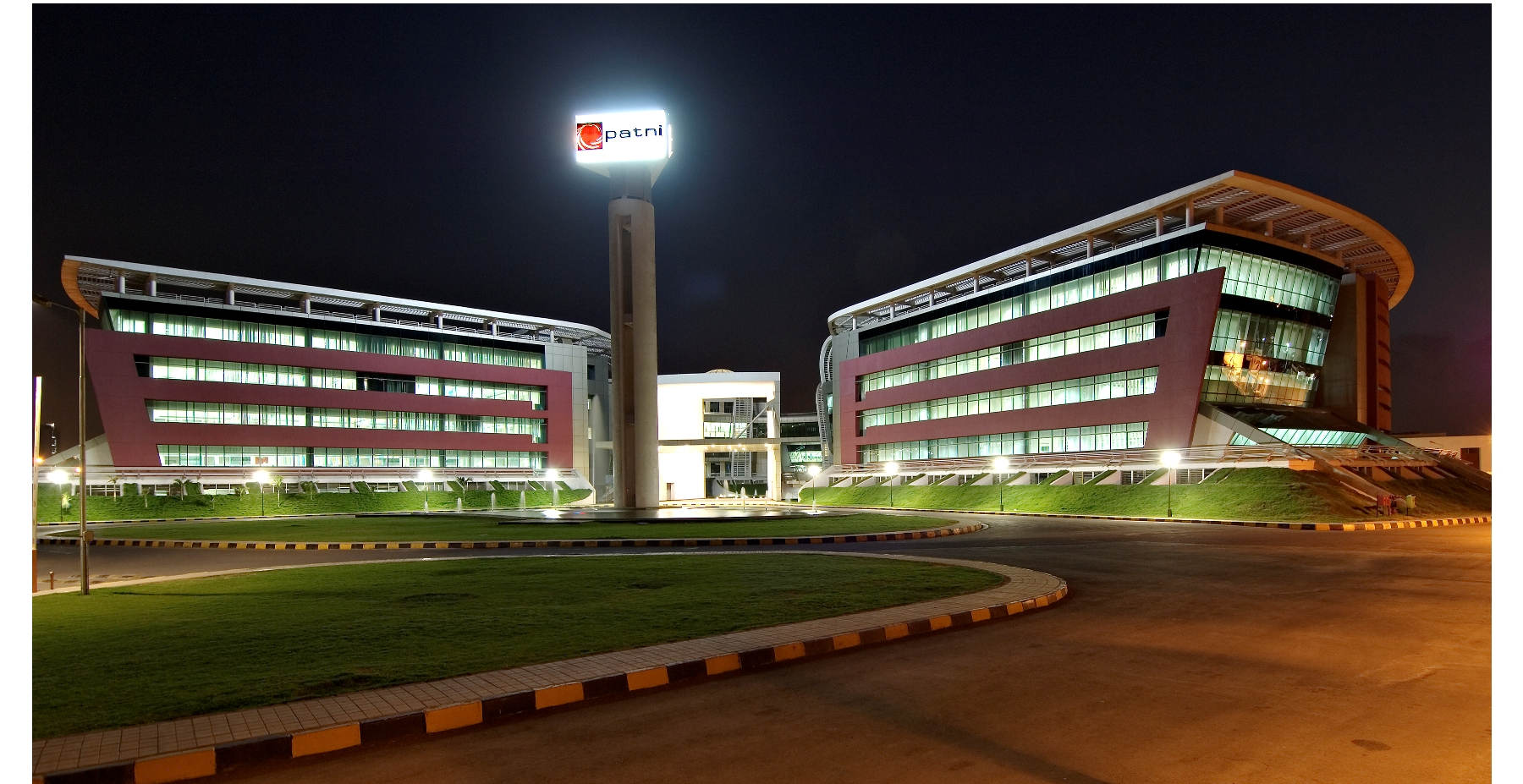
- Airoli IT Park in 2009

- Location within Mumbai
- Coordinates: 19°08′58″N 72°59′55″E
- Country: India
- State: Maharashtra
- District: Thane

Government
  - Type: Municipal Corporation
  - Body: Navi Mumbai Municipal Corporation

Population
  - Total: 200,000

Languages
  - Official: Marathi
- Time zone: UTC+5:30 (IST)
- PIN: 400708
- Telephone code: 022-277
- Vehicle registration: MH-43

Airoli (Marathi pronunciation: [əiɾoliː]) or Airoli Node is a residential and commercial area of Navi Mumbai in the Indian state of Maharashtra. The name Airoli Naka is derived from Airoli-Diva Gaon the largest village prominent in the node.

It is a part of the Mumbai Metropolitan Region and is administered by Navi Mumbai Municipal Corporation. It is connected to Mulund via Mulund Airoli bridge, to Thane by Kalwa bridge. Also, Thane Belapur Highway Provides well connectivity to Thane and rest of the Navi Mumbai. Airoli is also a part of extended Palm-Beach Road starting from Ghansoli and ending at Airoli near Dmart. Airoli also gaining a lot of tourist attraction due to Flamingo Boat Rides.

Airoli Knowledge Park

Airoli Knowledge Park is a Special Economic Zone developed for the IT companies. This is specifically dedicated to the Information Technology Companies and this starts from Airoli, Sec-20 Neva Garden Park Near MSEB Sub-Station Airlo till Mukund Bridge Thane. This entire corridor is developed for IT companies and their dedicated corporate parks. This SEZ consists of companies like Capgemini, Accenture, Wipro & Commercial Office Space providers like Mindspace. Many financial institutes like Axis Bank also have their corporate & operations units here.

== Educational facilities ==
=== Schools ===
- Coral Bells International School & Jr. College
- V.P.M's international School, Airoli
- DAV Public School Airoli
- New Horizon Public School and Penguin Kids, Airoli
- VIBGYOR High School, Airoli
- St. Xavier's High School, Airoli
- Zenith International & Petit School
- Radhikabai Meghe Sec. Vidyalaya(Mar.) & Jr. College
- New Horizon Scholars School and Neo Kids, Airoli
- Smt. Sushiladevi Deshmukh Pri. Vidyalaya (Eng)
- Sanjivandeep Vidyalaya Airoli
- Radhikabai Meghe Sec. Vidyalaya (Mar)
- Datta Meghe World Academy
- Mazidun High School

=== Colleges ===
- Datta Meghe College of Engineering
- Jnan Vikas Mandal's Mehta Degree College of Arts & Commerce
- New Horizon Institute of Management Studies
- MCT's College of Education & Research
- Smt Sushiladevi Deshmukh Vidyalaya & Jr College
- IISDET's School of Nursing

== See also ==
- Airoli Bridge
- Airoli railway station
