= Vashi =

- Business District of Navi Mumbai
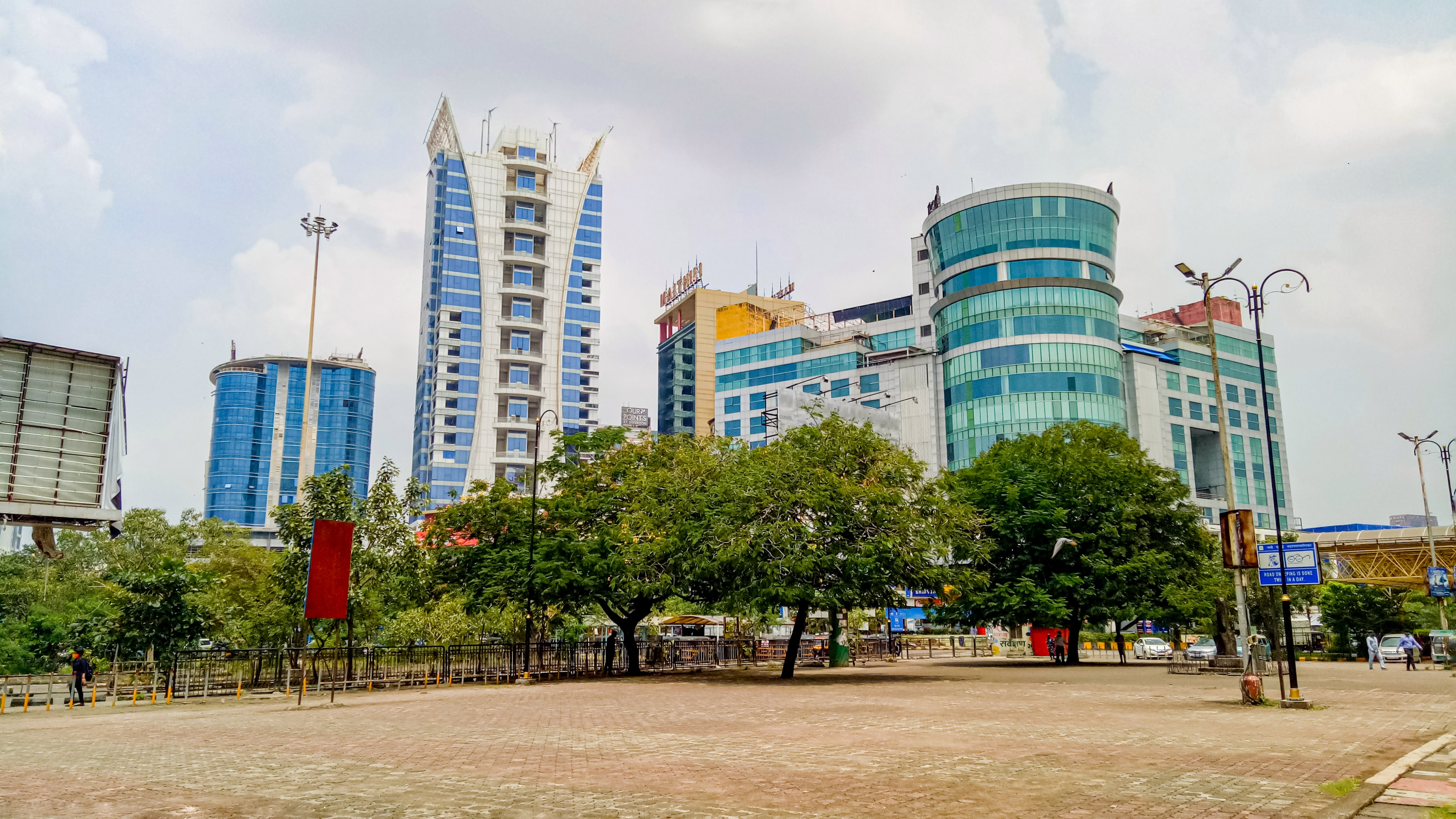

- Location within Mumbai
- Coordinates: 19.08°N 73.01°E
- Country: India
- State: Maharashtra
- District: Thane
- Established: 1972
- Founder: CIDCO

Government
  - Type: Municipal Corporation
  - Body: Navi Mumbai Municipal Corporation

Languages-
  - Official: Marathi
- Time zone: UTC+5:30 (IST)
- PIN: 400 703
- Vehicle registration: MH-43 Navi Mumbai
- Lok Sabha constituency: Thane
- Vidhan Sabha constituency: Belapur

Vashi is a residential and commercial node in Navi Mumbai, Maharashtra, across the Thane Creek of the Arabian Sea on the outskirts of Mumbai. Vashi is named after the largest village present in Vashi Node.

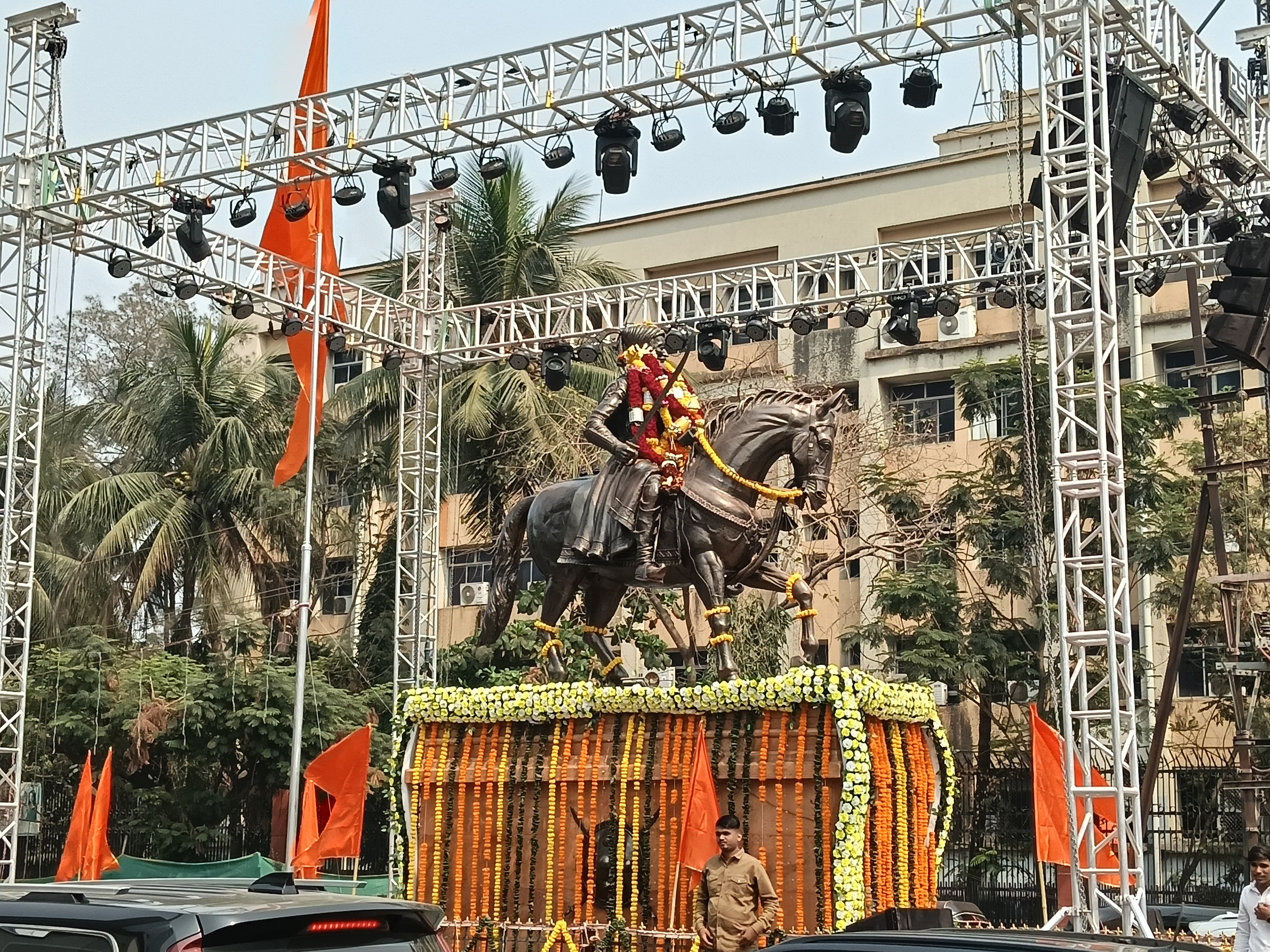
View of the Chhatrapati Shivaji Maharaj Chowk at Vashi near NMMT Bus Depot

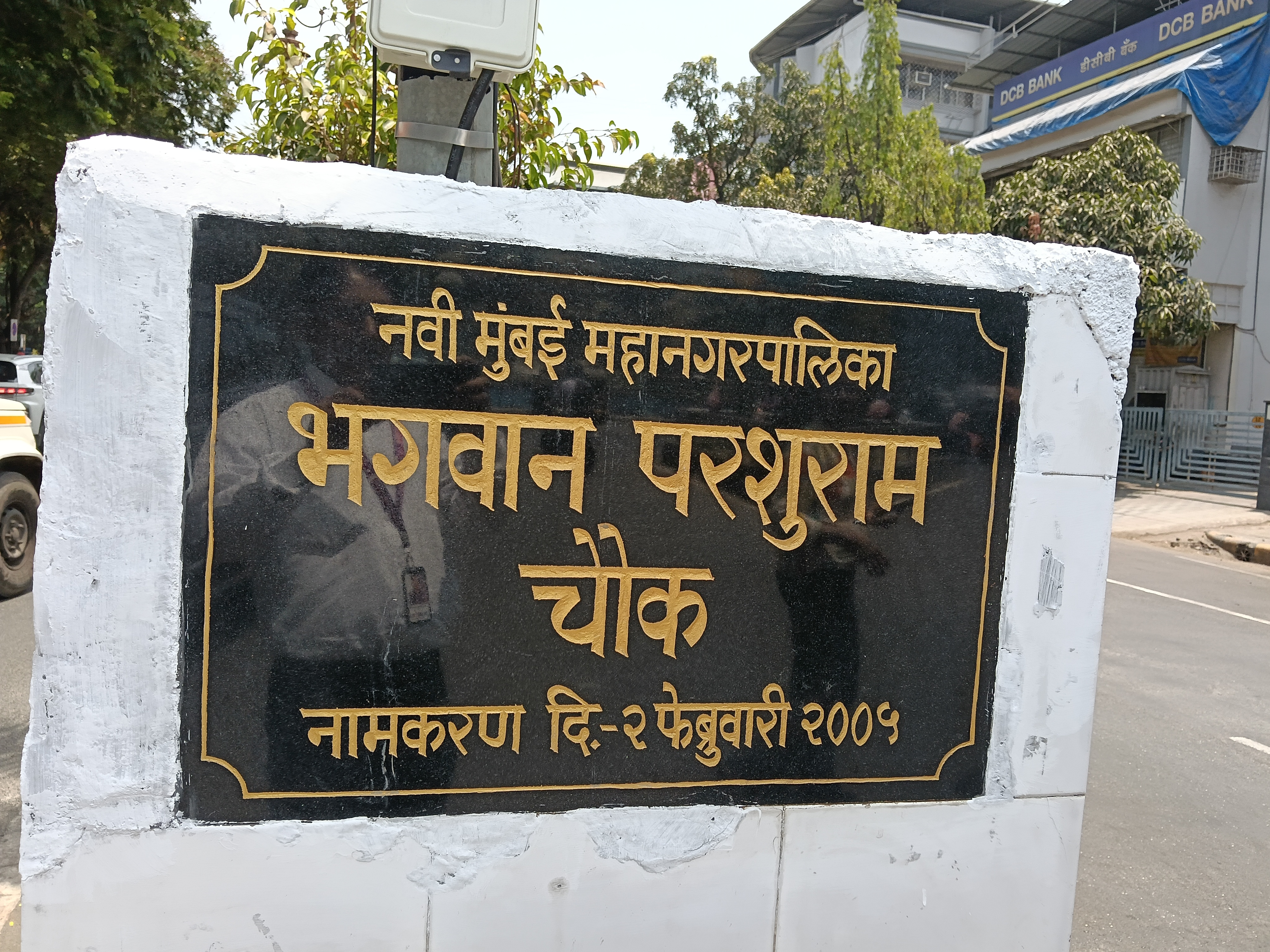
Bhagwan Parshuram Chowk at Sector 17 in Vashi

== Overview ==
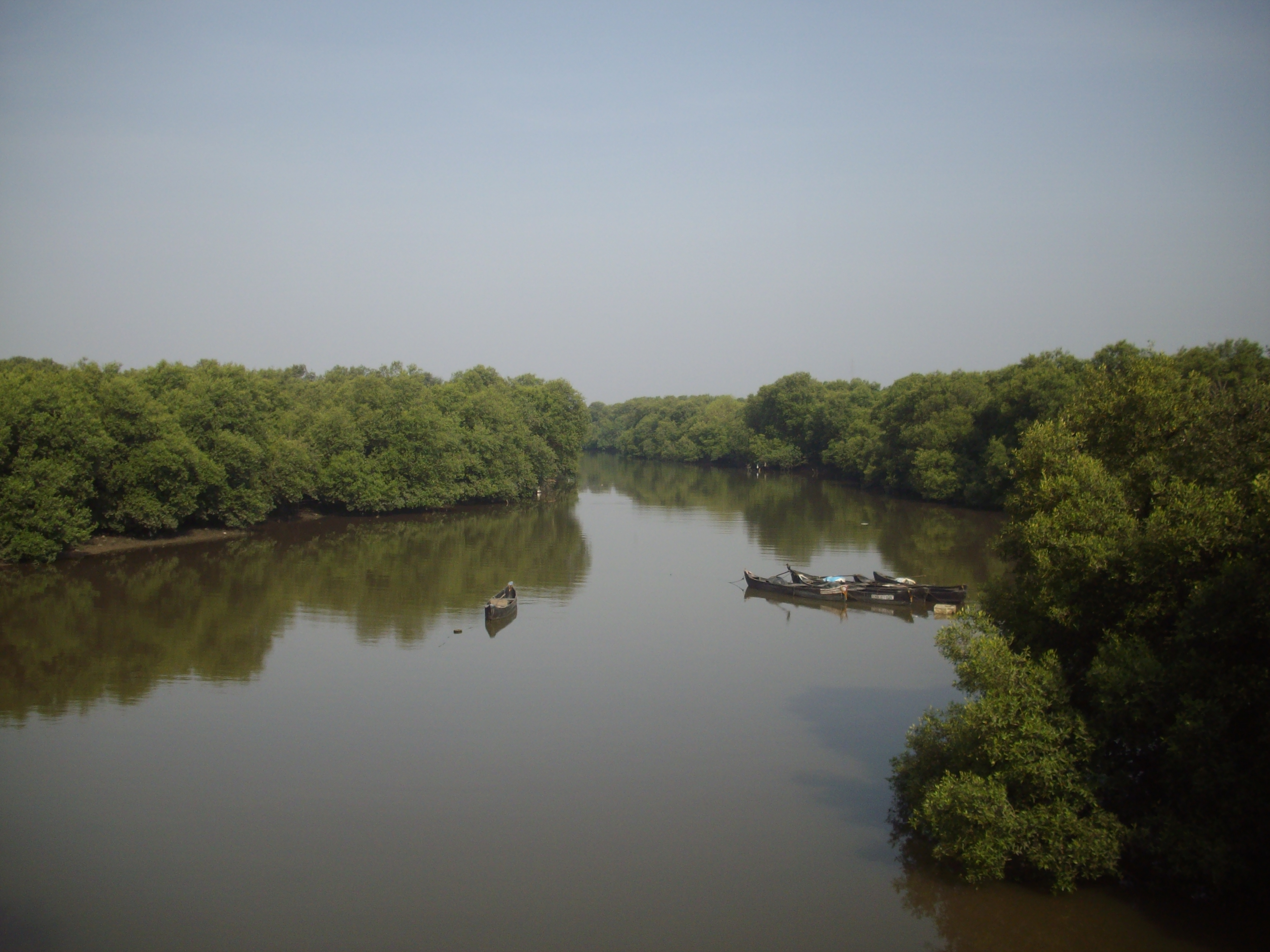
Vashi Creek and the Mangrove forests

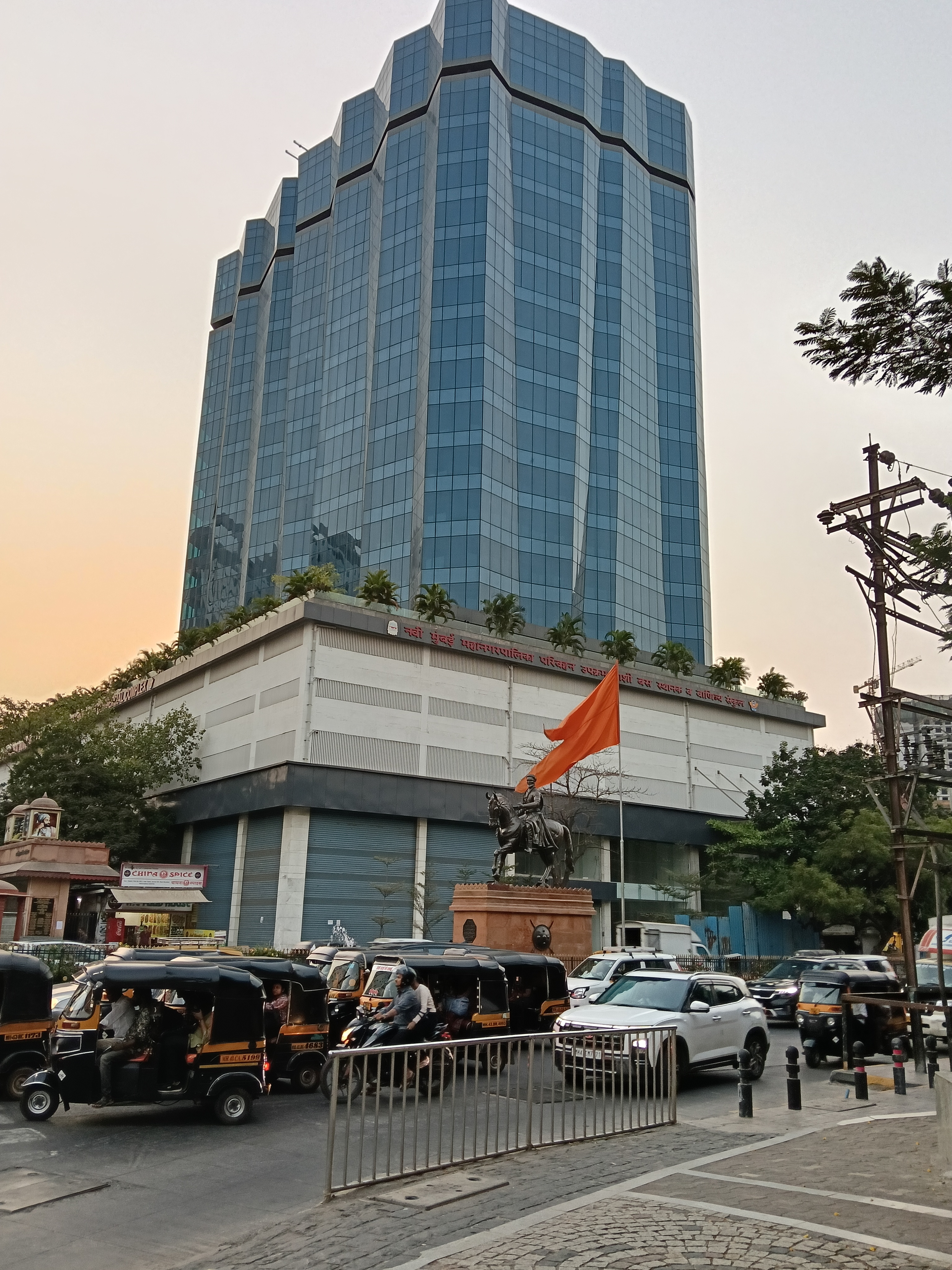
Vashi Bus Depot Building Complex

Vashi is a well-connected node of Navi Mumbai. It is also the first Navi Mumbai station after Mankhurd, which is the last station of the Mumbai Suburban city. Vashi is a well-organised suburban area that houses many commercial stores and has many residential societies. Vashi has three main and large malls, viz., Inorbit Mall Vashi, Palm Beach Galleria Mall and Raghuleela Mall. Along with these three malls several other small shopping plazas are also developed across vashi, e.g. Satra Plaza, Vashi Plaza. Vashi is located 20 minutes away from Chembur a suburban area in Mumbai and is easily accessible by both road and railways. Vashi is also a terminal railway station for Harbour Line and Trans-Harbour Line. Vashi is well known for its cosmopolitan culture and educational institutes.

Turbhe also houses an Agricultural Produce Market Committee (APMC) market where all the grocery items, food items, Rice, Lentils, wheat, and different types of Spices are sold at a wholesale price.

== Educational institutions ==
- Fr. Conceicao Rodrigues Institute of Technology
- Oriental Institute of Management
- ITM Group of Institutions
- Karmaveer Bhaurao Patil College
- Fr. Agnel Multipurpose School and Junior College

== See also ==
- Vashi Bridge
- Vashi railway station
- Inorbit Mall in Vashi
- Raghuleela Mall, Vashi
