= Mankhurd =

Mankhurd मानखुर्द
- Suburb
- Location within Mumbai
- Coordinates: 19.05°N 72.93°E
- Country: India
- State: Maharashtra
- District: Mumbai Suburban
- City: Mumbai
- Zone: 5
- Ward: M

Government
  - Type: Municipal Corporation
  - Body: Brihanmumbai Municipal Corporation (MCGM)
  - M.L.A: Abu Azmi; Samajwadi Party (since 2014)
  - M.P.: Sanjay Dina Patil; SS(UBT) (since 2024)

Population
  - Total: 674,850
- Demonym: Mankhurdkar

Hindi
  - Official: Marathi
- Time zone: UTC+5:30 (IST)
- Postal code: 400088
- Area code: 022

Mankhurd (Pronunciation: [maːnkʰuɾd̪(ə)]) is a suburb in eastern Mumbai, Maharashtra. Mankhurd railway station is on the Harbour Line of the Mumbai Suburban Railway. Bhabha Atomic Research Centre is near from here.

== Geography ==
The Mankhurd suburb is part of and the easternmost boundary of the municipal ward M-East.

== Government institutions ==
The Navjivan Sudhar Kendra (a.k.a. Navjivan Mahila Vustigruh) is a shelter for rescued women (women rescued by the police during raids in bars and brothels). The inmates are sheltered here pending the resolution of their respective cases in civil and criminal courts. This institution has been in the news recently when 17 inmates escaped from the shelter. In the subsequent investigation by both government and media agencies, the administration of the shelter has been thoroughly criticised. A report by a Mumbai High Court-appointed committee calls it "a living hell".

== See also ==
- Govandi
- Lalubhai Compound
- Deonar dumping ground
- Mankhurd railway station
