= Thane–Belapur Road =

Motorway in Marharashtra

- Map of Thane–Belapur Road

Route information
- Maintained by Navi Mumbai Municipal Corporation; Maharashtra State Road Development Corporation
- Length: 15.1 km (9.4 mi)

Major junctions
- South end: Sion Panvel Highway
- North end: Kalwa, Thane

Location
- Country: India
- State: Maharashtra
- Major cities: Thane, Navi Mumbai
- Primary destinations: Turbhe, Kopar Khairane, Mahape, Ghansoli, Rabale, Airoli, Dighe, Thane

Highway system
- Roads in India; Expressways; National; State; Asian; State Highways in Maharashtra

Thane–Belapur Road is a major road connecting the city of Thane with Navi Mumbai. The southern end of Thane–Belapur Road starts at the Sion Panvel Highway near Juinagar. The road passes through a busy Thane – Belapur region and generally runs in a north–south direction. During the stretch between Turbhe and Digha, the Thane–Belapur Road runs completely parallel to the Trans-Harbour Line of Mumbai Suburban Railway and the stations of Airoli, Rabale, Ghansoli, Kopar Khairane and Turbhe all have direct access from this road. This road also connects the cities of Thane, Kalwa, and Airoli to the Mumbai-Pune Expressway.

Except for a small stretch at Digha, the entire Thane–Belapur Road has been widened to a total of 6 lanes (3 lanes in each direction) and fully concretized. Several major industrial parks such as MIDC, Airoli IT Park, Reliance Jio Infocomm Limited, Dhirubhai Ambani Knowledge City, Millennium Business Park, Reliance Hospital, and DY Patil Stadium are located beside this road in addition to many other businesses and corporate premises.

== Major intersections ==
- Sion Panvel Highway at Turbhe
- Vashi-Turbhe link road at Turbhe
- Palm Beach Marg at Pawane
- Vashi-Shil Phata road at Mahape
- Airoli Bridge road at Airoli
- National Highway 4 at Kalwa

== Gallery ==
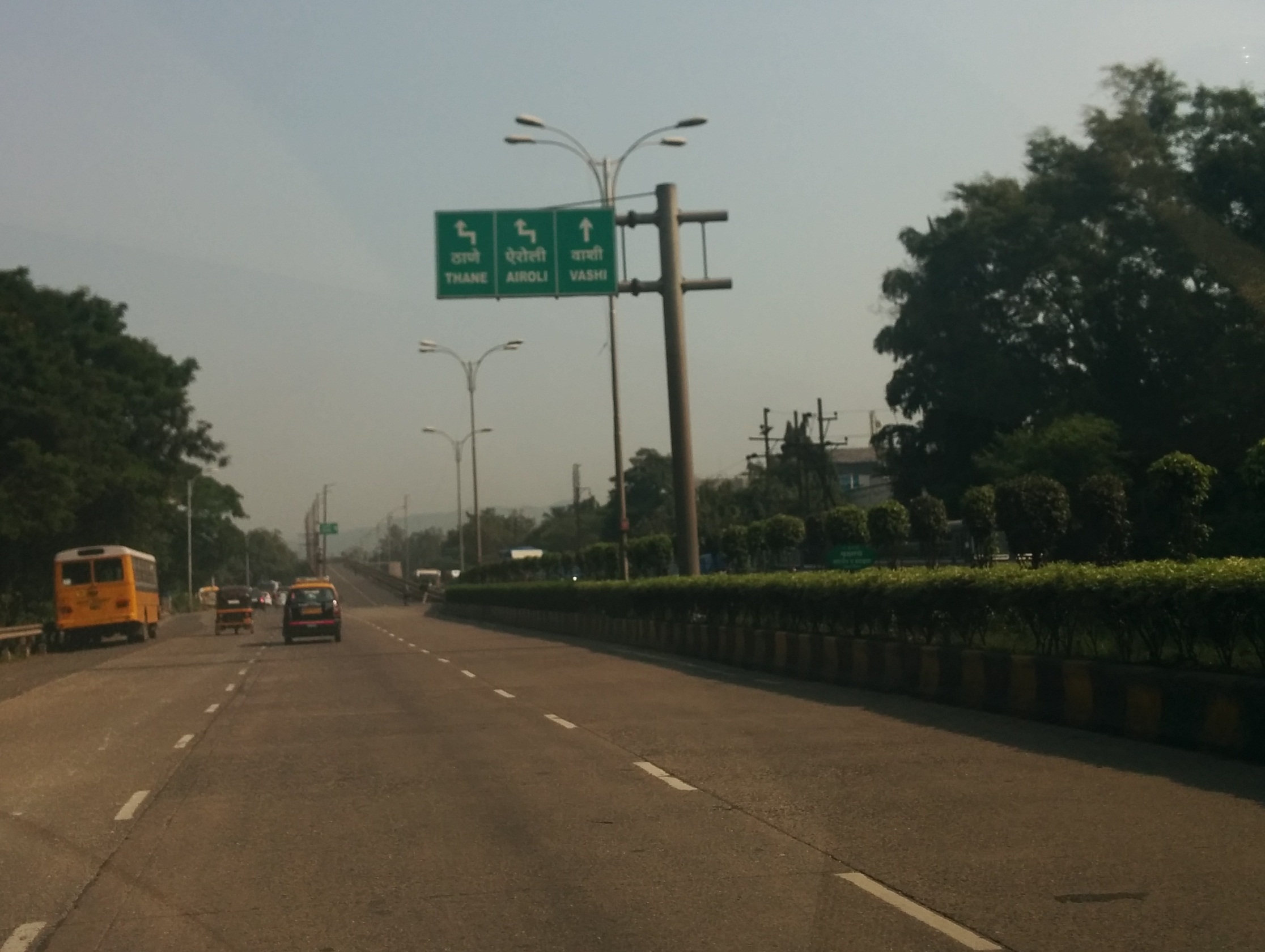
North-bound Thane–Belapur Road near Pawane.

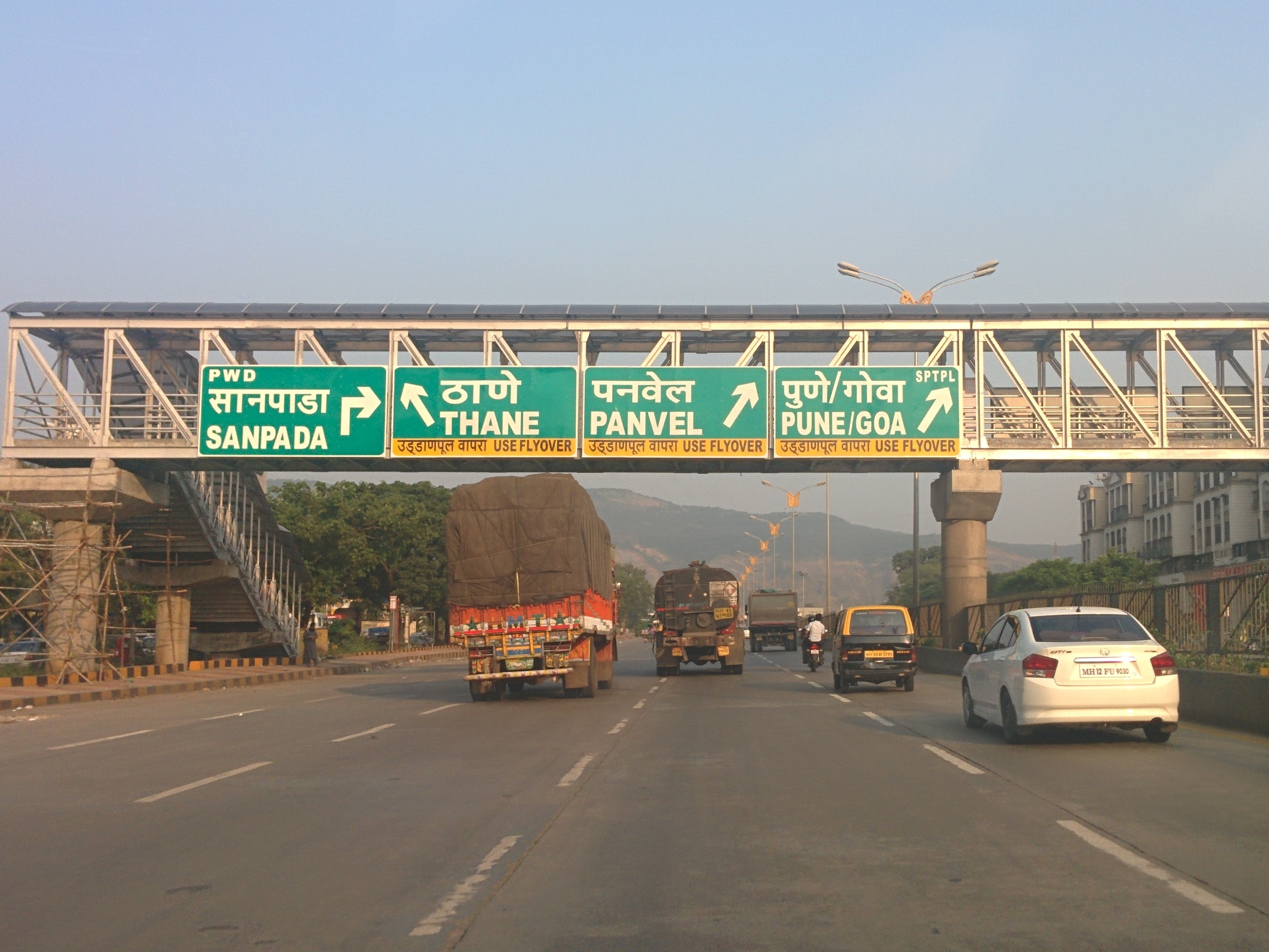
Exit sign for Thane–Belapur Road on Sion Panvel Highway near Sanpada.

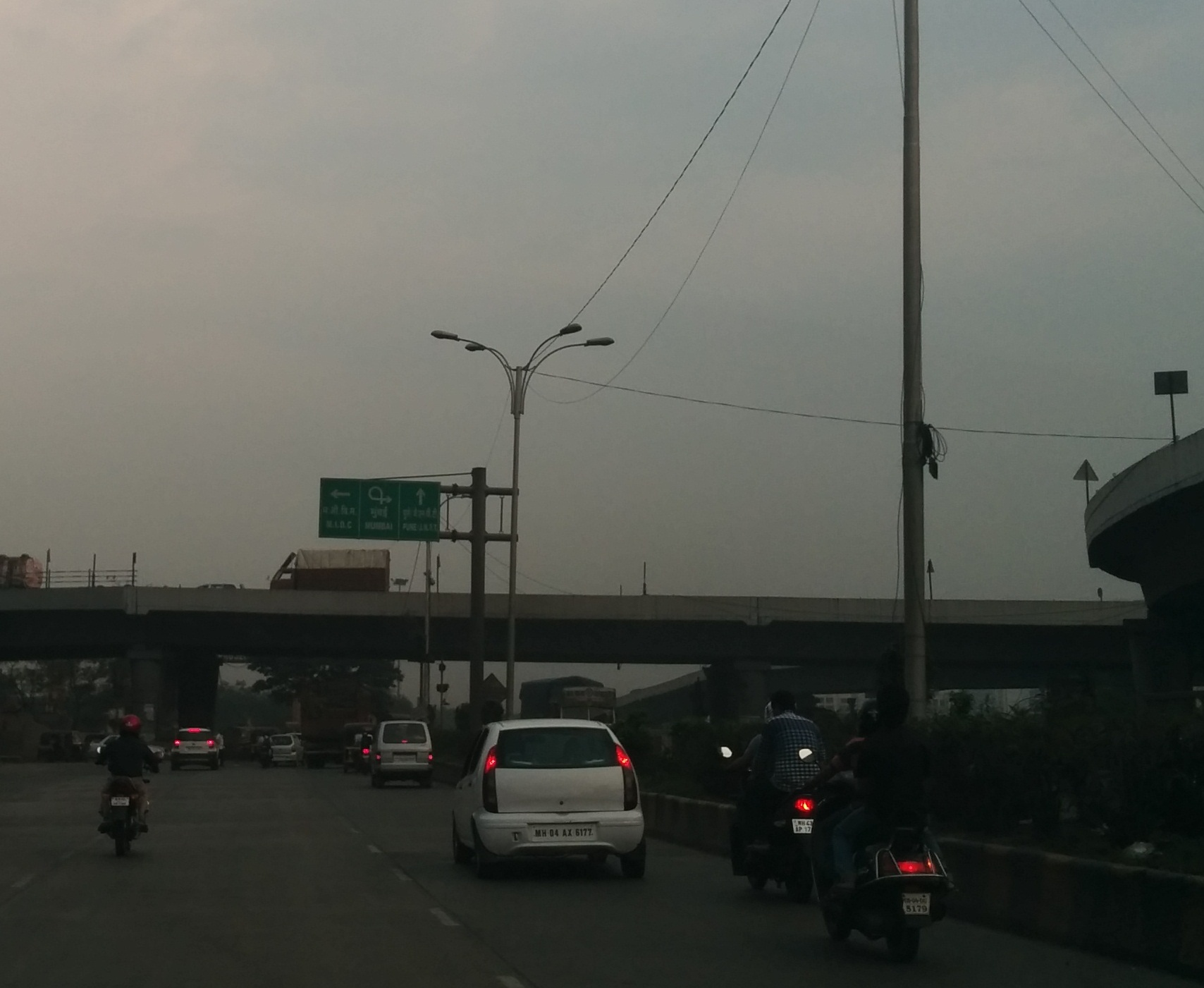
Southern terminus of Thane–Belapur Road at Sion Panvel Highway near Turbhe.

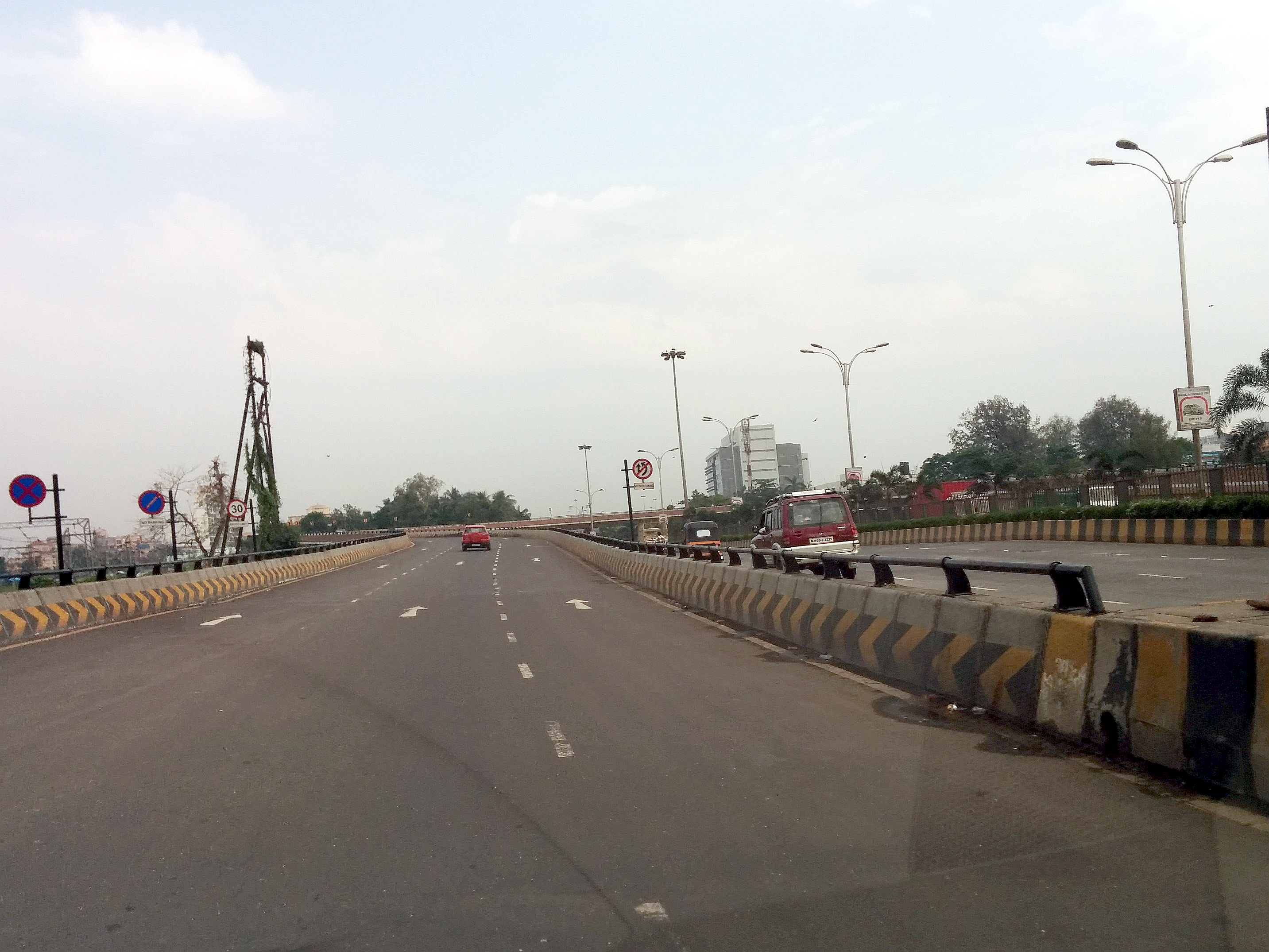
U-turn overpass near Kopar Khairane for north-bound vehicles heading towards industrial area on the east side.
