= Koparkhairane railway station =

Railway station on trans-harbour line

Koparkhairane

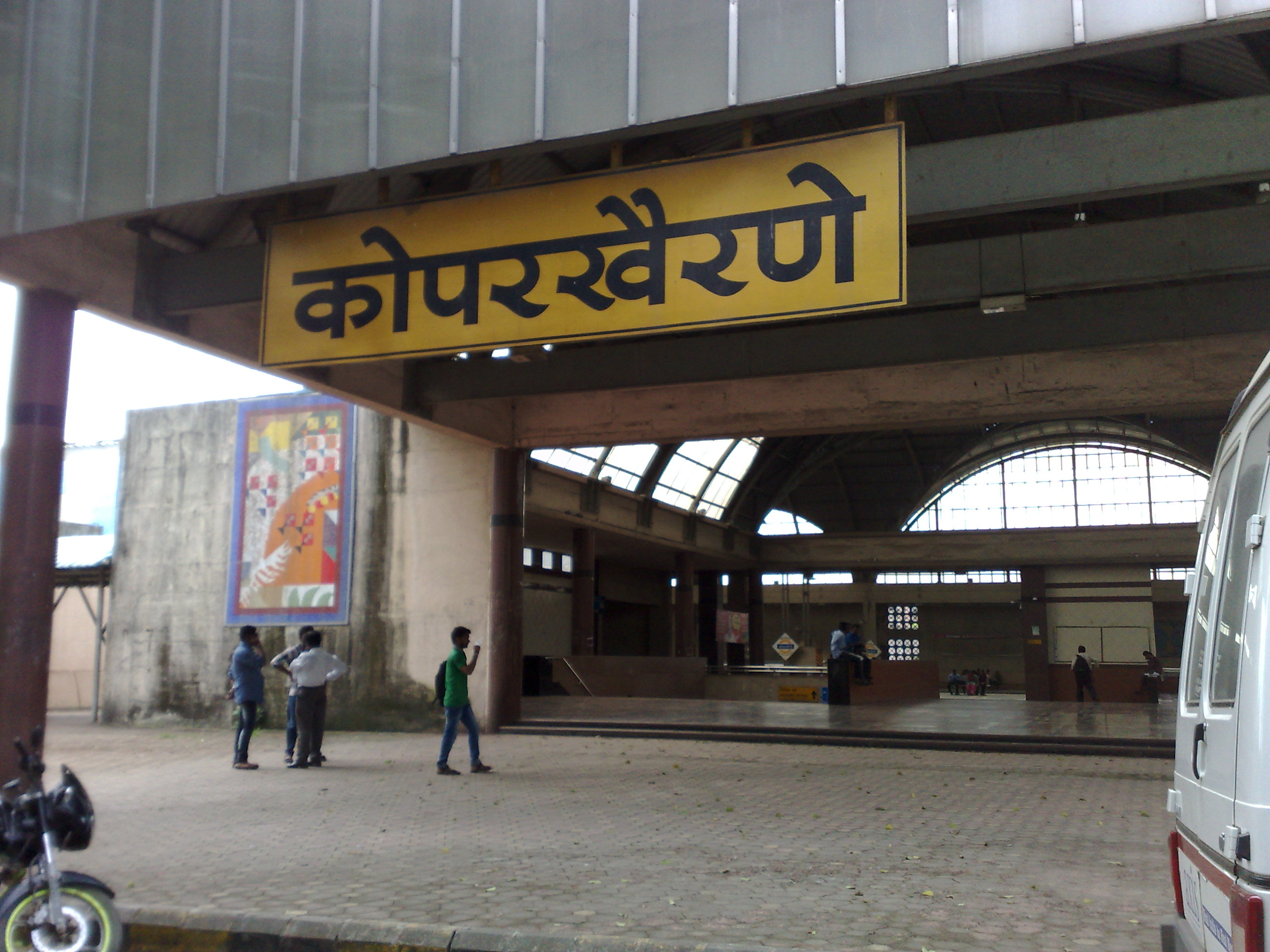

General information
- Coordinates: 19.1033°N 73.0113°E
- System: Mumbai Suburban Railway station
- Owner: Ministry of Railways, Indian Railways
- Line: Trans-Harbour Line
- Platforms: 2

Construction
- Structure type: Standard on-ground station

Other information
- Status: Active
- Station code: KPHN
- Fare zone: Central Railways

History
- Opened: 9 November 2004

Services
Preceding station	Mumbai Suburban Railway	Following station
Ghansoli towards Thane	Trans-Harbour line	Turbhe towards Vashi or Panvel
Route map
Location
- Location within India Location within Maharashtra Location within Mumbai

Koparkhairane is a railway station (KPHN) on the Trans-Harbour line of the Indian Mumbai Suburban Railway network in Navi Mumbai, Maharashtra, India.

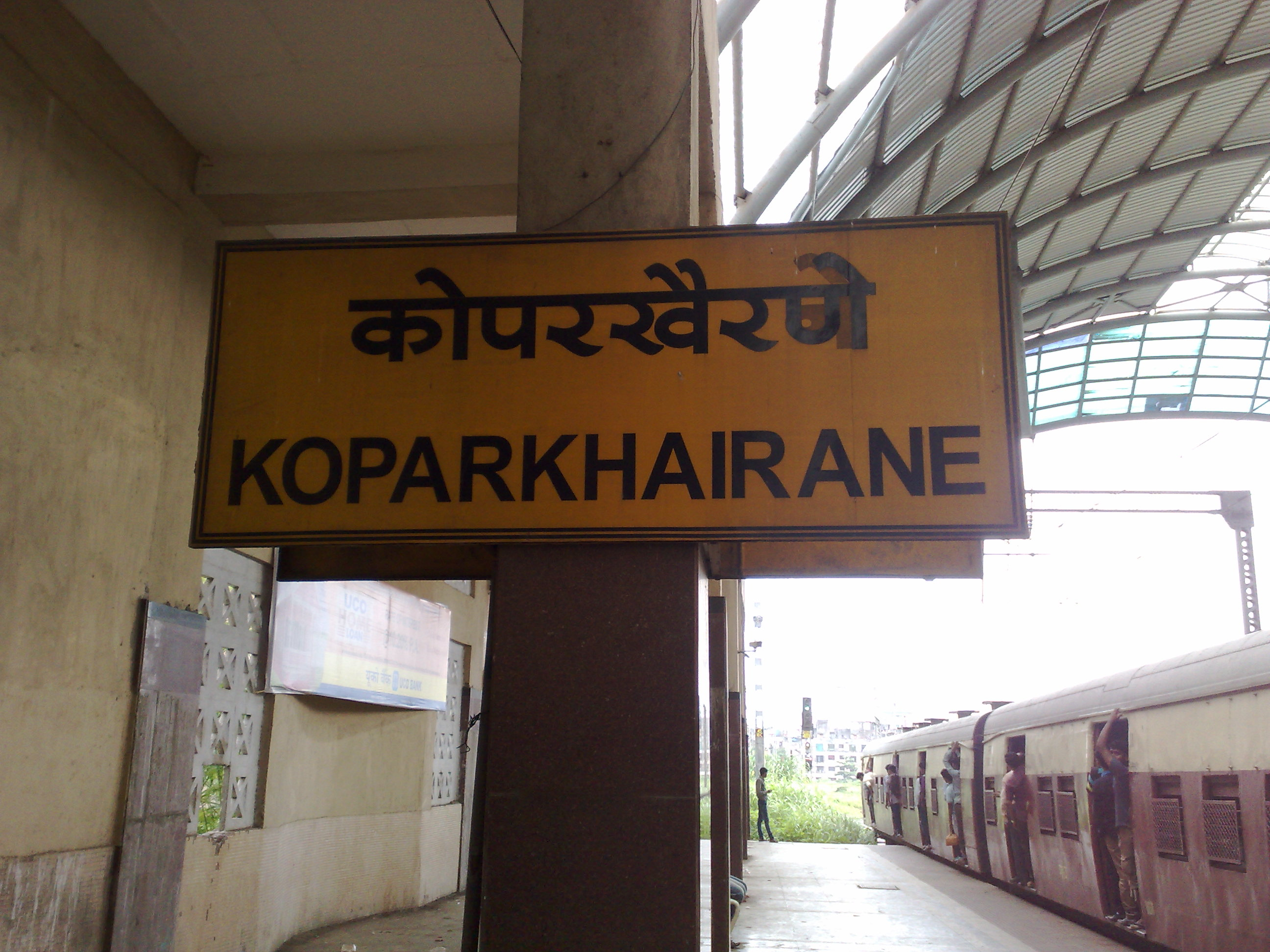
Station board – Kopar Khairane

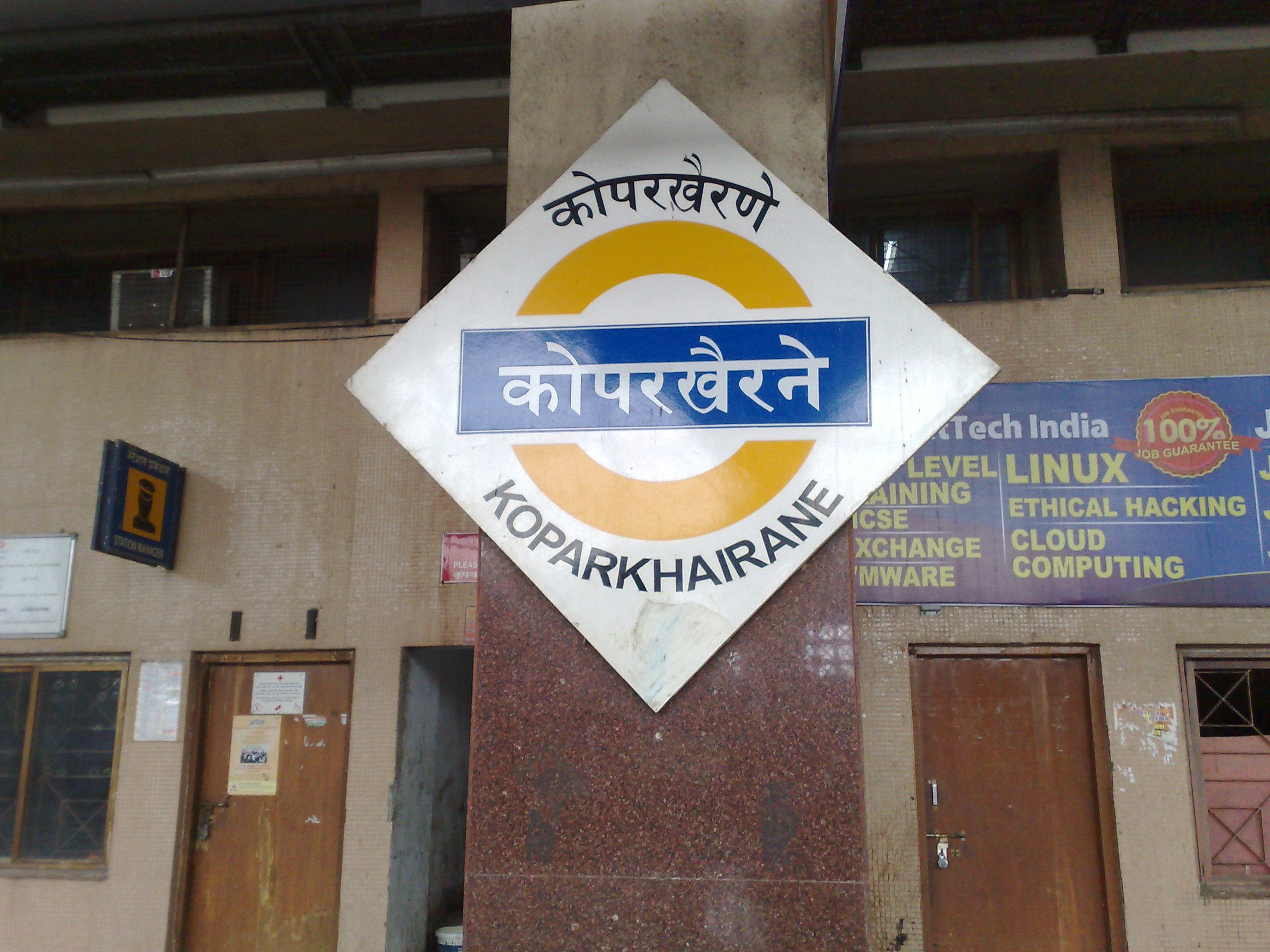
Platform board – Kopar Khairane

Koparkhairane, is local train railway station is on the Thane–Turbhe–Nerul/Vashi Railway Line, which was commissioned on 9 November 2004. It is situated at a distance of 12 km from Thane and 7 km from Vashi.

The railway station is located in Sector 8A of the node. It is accessible from both the Thane–Belapur road on the eastern side and the Koparkhairane node on the western side. Koparkhairane is the fifth railway station on the Thane–Koparkhairane–Vashi/Nerul Rail Corridor, a 23-km-long corridor connecting Thane with Navi Mumbai.

As of 2008, there were seventeen services a day on this rail line in either direction. There are 212 trains that pass through daily the Koparkhairane Railway station. Some of the major trains passing through KPHN are – (PANVEL Fast & Slow, BELAPUR CBD Slow, Vashi Slow, etc.). It takes 15 minutes to reach Nerul and 11 minutes to reach Vashi railway station.

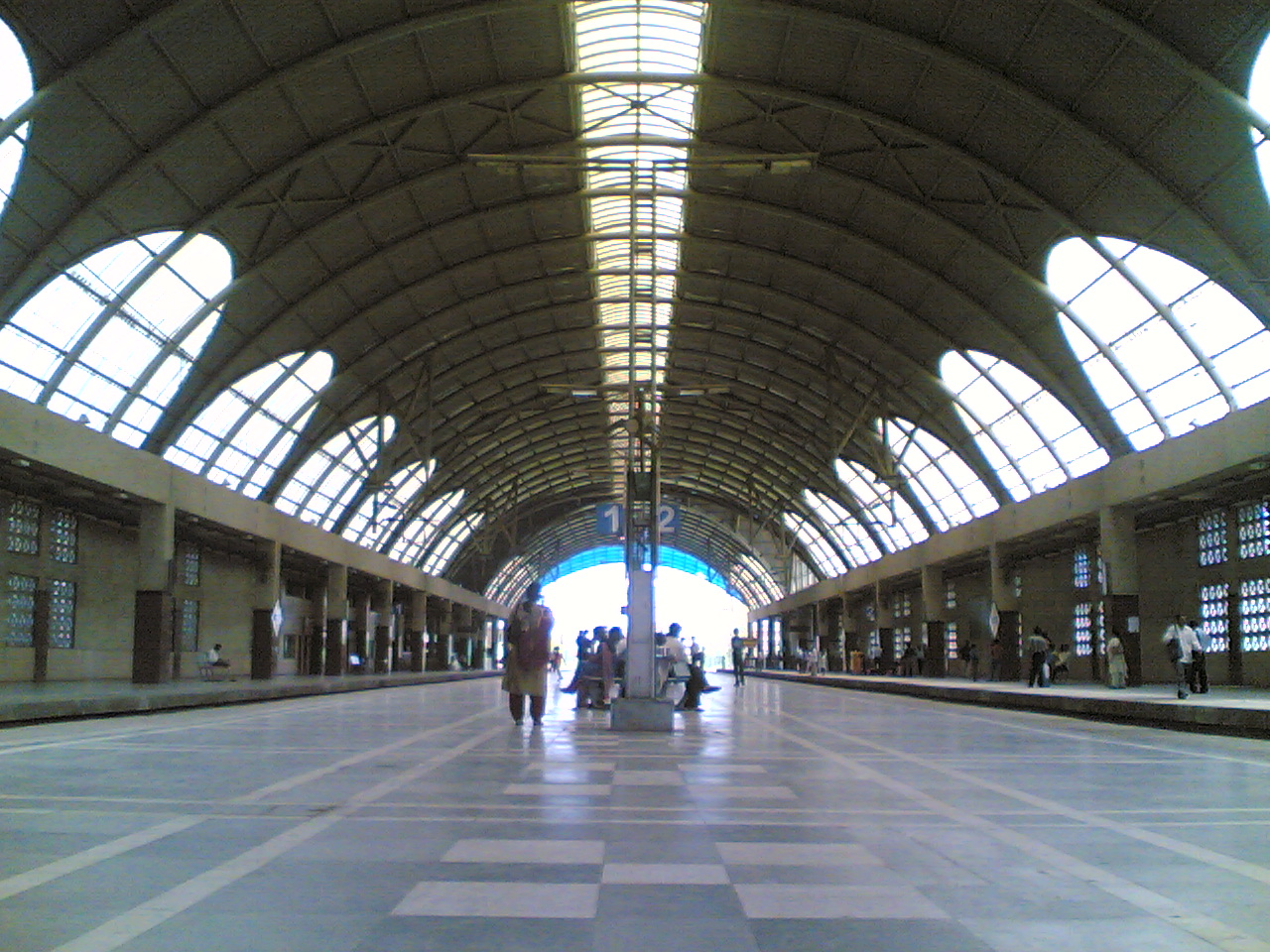
Kopar Khairne station
