= Digha Gaon railway station =

Railway station in India

Digha Gaon

General information
- Location: Digha, Navi Mumbai, Maharashtra; India
- System: Mumbai Suburban Railway station
- Owner: Indian Railways
- Operator: Central Railway
- Line: Trans-Harbour line
- Platforms: 4 (2 currently active and 2 ready (trains do not stop on them))
- Tracks: 4 (2 currently active and 2 to be developed)

Construction
- Structure type: Standard (on-ground station)
- Parking: No
- Cycle facilities: No

Other information
- Status: Active
- Station code: DIGH
- Zone(s): Central Railway
- Division(s): Mumbai CR

History
- Opened: 12 January 2024

Services
Preceding station	Mumbai Suburban Railway	Following station
Thane Terminus	Trans-Harbour line	Airoli towards Vashi or Panvel
Route map
Location

Digha Gaon railway station is a railway station located in the Thane district of Maharashtra, India. The station includes two platforms, each 270 meters long and 12 meters wide, designed to accommodate 12-car local trains. It will also have several passenger facilities, including two lifts, six escalators and four underpasses.

Digha Goan railway station is located adjacent to the Thane–Belapur Road, crossing over the Thane-Vashi line. It is serve as the primary focal point to divert Vashi trains to the Kalwa line, enabling them to reach Kalyan on the mainline. It is a part of the Airoli-Kalwa elevated corridor project.

The station is situated 35.22 kilometers away from Mumbai's Chhatrapati Shivaji Terminus (CSMT), and is located 3.2 kilometers away from the current Thane and 2.6 kilometers from Airoli. According to Mumbai Railway Vikas Corporation officials, the entire project is expected to cost nearly Rs 110 crore, including the construction of a ground-plus two-storey structure on each side of the station for booking offices, with four ticket windows on either side.
