= Rabale =

- Node of Navi Mumbai
- Location within Mumbai
- Coordinates: 19°08′39″N 73°00′31″E
- Country: India
- State: Maharashtra
- District: Thane
- Founder: CIDCO

Government
  - Body: Navi Mumbai Municipal Corporation

Languages
  - Official: Marathi
- Time zone: UTC+5:30 (IST)

Rabale is a residential area located between the suburbs of Airoli and Ghansoli on the Thane-Belapur road in Navi Mumbai. Rabale Area is well known for the Rabale MIDC area which houses many manufacturing units. Rabale railway station is situated between the Airoli and Ghansoli stations.
