= Lokmanya Tilak College of Engineering =

Engineering college in Navi Mumbai, India

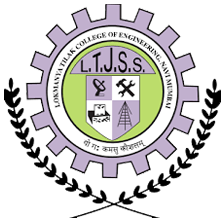
- Type: Private
- Established: 1994; 32 years ago
- Accreditation: NAAC Grade A
- Affiliations: AICTE, University of Mumbai
- Chairman: Satish Chaturvedi
- Principal: Subhash Shinde
- Faculty: 125 (approx)
- Undergraduates: 2160 (approx)
- Postgraduates: 61/batch (approx)
- Location: Navi Mumbai, Maharashtra, India
- Acronym: LTCE, LT, LTC & LTCoE
- Website: https://ltce.in/

Lokmanya Tilak JanKalyan Shikshan Sanstha's Lokmanya Tilak College of Engineering, Kopar Khairane, Navi Mumbai, established in 1994 is an engineering college in Navi Mumbai. The college is affiliated with the University of Mumbai and the official engineering degrees are issued by the same. The college is approved by AICTE, New Delhi and is recognized by the government of Maharashtra.

== History ==
The college was established in 1994 under the banner of LTJSS. The institute is named after the Indian freedom fighter Bal Gangadhar Tilak; an eminent, mathematician, great educationist and social reformer.

Founded in 1983 by Dr. Satish Chaturvedi, LTJSS is a corpus of 30 institutions(engineering, architecture, pharmacy) across India. Other institutions under the LTJSS umbrella include Priyadarshini College of Engineering, an A+ grade NAAC accredited university in Nagpur, and Priyadarshini Institute of Engineering and Technology.

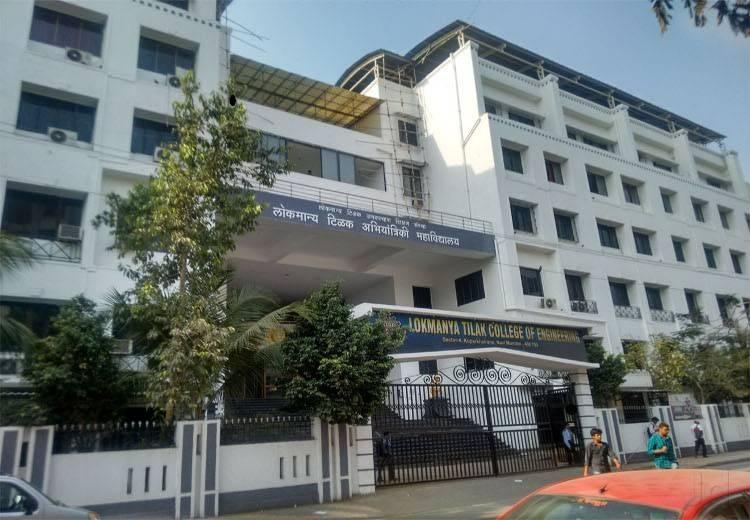
Front View

Initially, undergraduate engineering comprised Mechanical, Electrical, and Computer engineering tracks. In 2001, LTCE added the Electronics and Telecommunication Engineering department. Postgraduate programs were offered around the mid-2010's. In 2020, three new Computer Science and Engineering specialized departments were introduced due to the growing demand for AI and IoT:

- Data Science
- Artificial Intelligence and Machine Learning
- IoT and Cyber Security including Block Chain Tech

== Academic Divisions ==
LTCE offers undergraduate B.E. courses in various engineering fields. It also offers other postgraduate course degrees(M.E. and Ph.D.) The total number of undergraduate students per batch is 540.

=== Undergraduate (B.E.) ===
Branch	Duration	Year of Establishment	Intake
Computer Engineering	4	1994	120
Mechanical Engineering	4	1994	120
Electrical Engineering	4	1995	60
Electronics and Telecommunication Engineering	4	2001	60
Computer Science and Engineering (Data Science)	4	2020	60
Computer Science and Engineering (Artificial Intelligence and Machine Learning)	4	2020	60
Computer Science and Engineering (IoT and Cyber Security including Blockchain Tech)	4	2020	60

=== Postgraduate (M.E., Ph.D.) ===
- Mechanical Engineering
- Computer Engineering

== Campus and College Life ==
The 2.8-acre college campus is located in Koparkhairane and consists of two buildings and a field.

The mechanical engineering workshop is located on the ground floor. Computer labs, a library, and a large seminar hall(used frequently for guest seminars, academic conferences, and cultural activities) are located on the fifth level. The library comprises a multimedia lab, providing free access to technical journal papers (IEEE, collection of NPTEL lectures, IETE).

The R&D lab was established in 2004 to encourage and foster in-house research projects. The college is located near industrial brands in Navi Mumbai, such as Dhirubhai Ambani Knowledge City, Siemens, Pfizer, Larson and Toubro, Nocil Limited (part of Dow Chemical Company), Reliance Silicones, Tifil. The students and engineering faculty are actively involved with securing research projects from industries for the final year project thesis.

=== Student Clubs ===
- Catharsis: College Magazine
- MESA: Mechanical Engineering Student Association
- Prakalp: Inter-college Project Expo
- Robocon team: Internal student team participating in ABU Robocon, a highly competitive international robotic competition
- Tantragyan: Project Competition
- TechZephyr: Technical Festival
- WDC: Women Development Cell, an internal club for passionate feminist thinkers
- Zephyr: Annual Cultural Festival held every Spring
- CESA, CSI & GDSC i.e Google Developer Student Club, etc.

== Student Career Fair & Hiring ==
Major recruiters include AWS, Byju's, IBM, Tech Mahindra, Infosys, Capgemini, TCS, Cognizant and Accenture. The complete list of students placed in the 2021-22 fiscal year can be found on the college website. In the 2021-22 fiscal year, 95 companies visited the college for recruiting and hired a total of 230 students. The highest package received by a student that year was around 10LPA.

== See also ==
- Educational Institutes in Navi Mumbai
