= Ghansoli railway station =

Railway Station in Maharashtra, India

Ghansoli

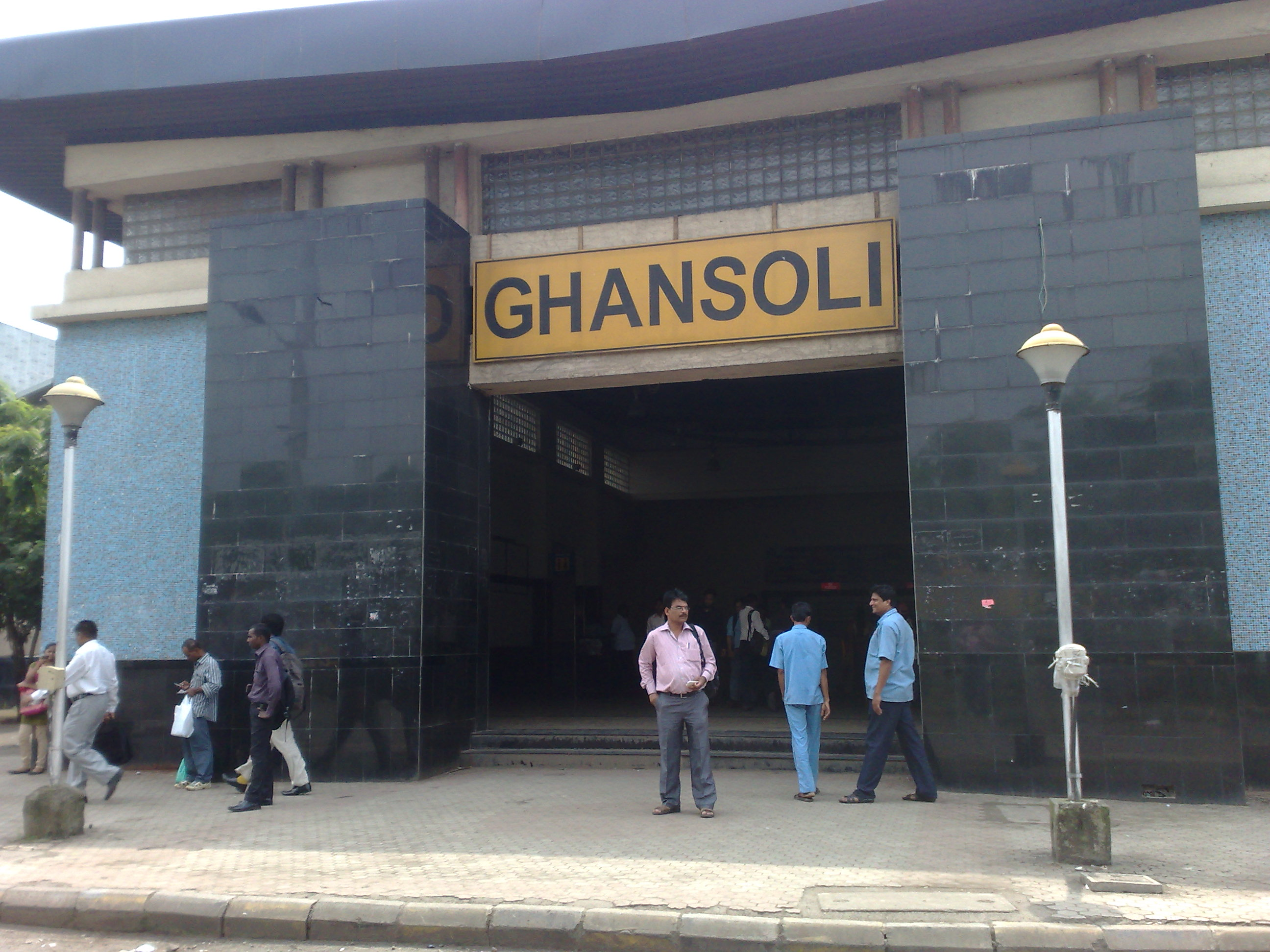

General information
- Coordinates: 19.1164°N 73.0070°E
- System: Mumbai Suburban Railway station
- Owner: Ministry of Railways, Indian Railways
- Line: Trans-Harbour Line
- Platforms: 2
- Tracks: 2

Construction
- Structure type: Standard on-ground station
- Platform levels: 1
- Parking: 4 Wheeler & 2 Wheeler
- Cycle facilities: parking available

Other information
- Status: Active
- Station code: GNSL
- Fare zone: Central Railways

History
- Opened: 2004
- Rebuilt: Expansion in 2013 for 12 coaches

Passengers
- more than 1000 commuter daily

Services
Preceding station	Mumbai Suburban Railway	Following station
Rabale towards Thane	Trans-Harbour line	Koparkhairane towards Vashi or Panvel
Route map
Location
- Location within India Location within Maharashtra Location within Mumbai

Ghansoli is a railway station on the Harbour line of the Mumbai Suburban Railway network. It is located on Thane–Belapur road in Sector-2 of Ghansoli node. The station is located in the vicinity of multiple business parks and office spaces, including the corporate headquarters of Reliance Industries Ltd.

Ghansoli node comes under the jurisdiction of Rabale police station and adjoins Koparkhairane node towards the South, Airoli node towards the North and Dighe towards the East. Mangroves line the Western borders of Ghansoli. This station is equipped with basic amenities like toilets, ticket counter only for local trains, ATVM, and coupon validating machines, CCTV surveillance, and special arrangement for disabled persons. This station however doesnt have any food facilities and for basic fast food and water people have to go outside the station. You can go to Jaslok Sweets, Burger King, WoW Momos, Prem Sweets, Ganesh Vadapav and many other small eateries for catching fast food. Currently Ghansoli Station surrounding area is being upgraded for better parking facilities and other facilities for the travellers.

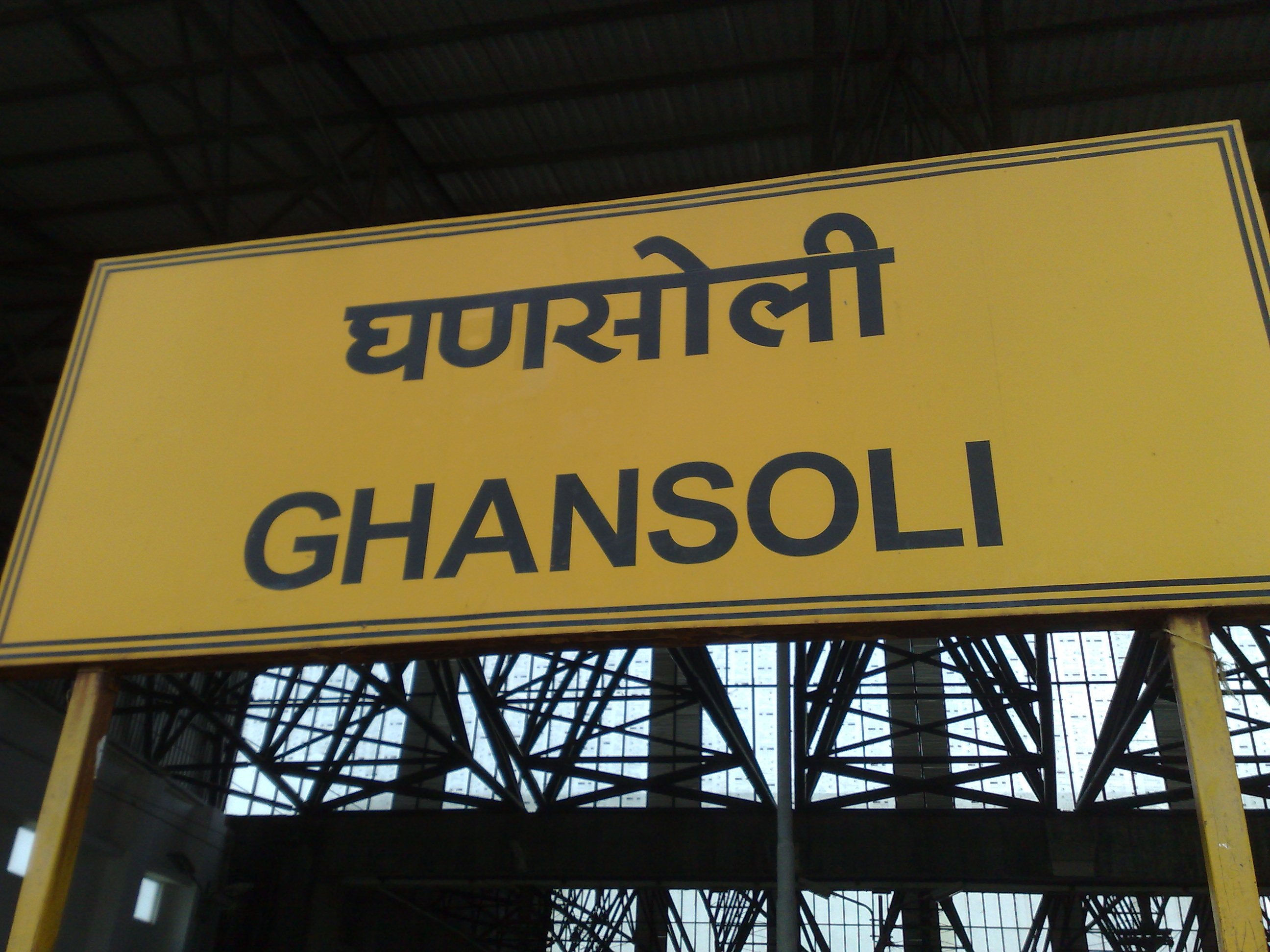
Stationboard – Ghansoli

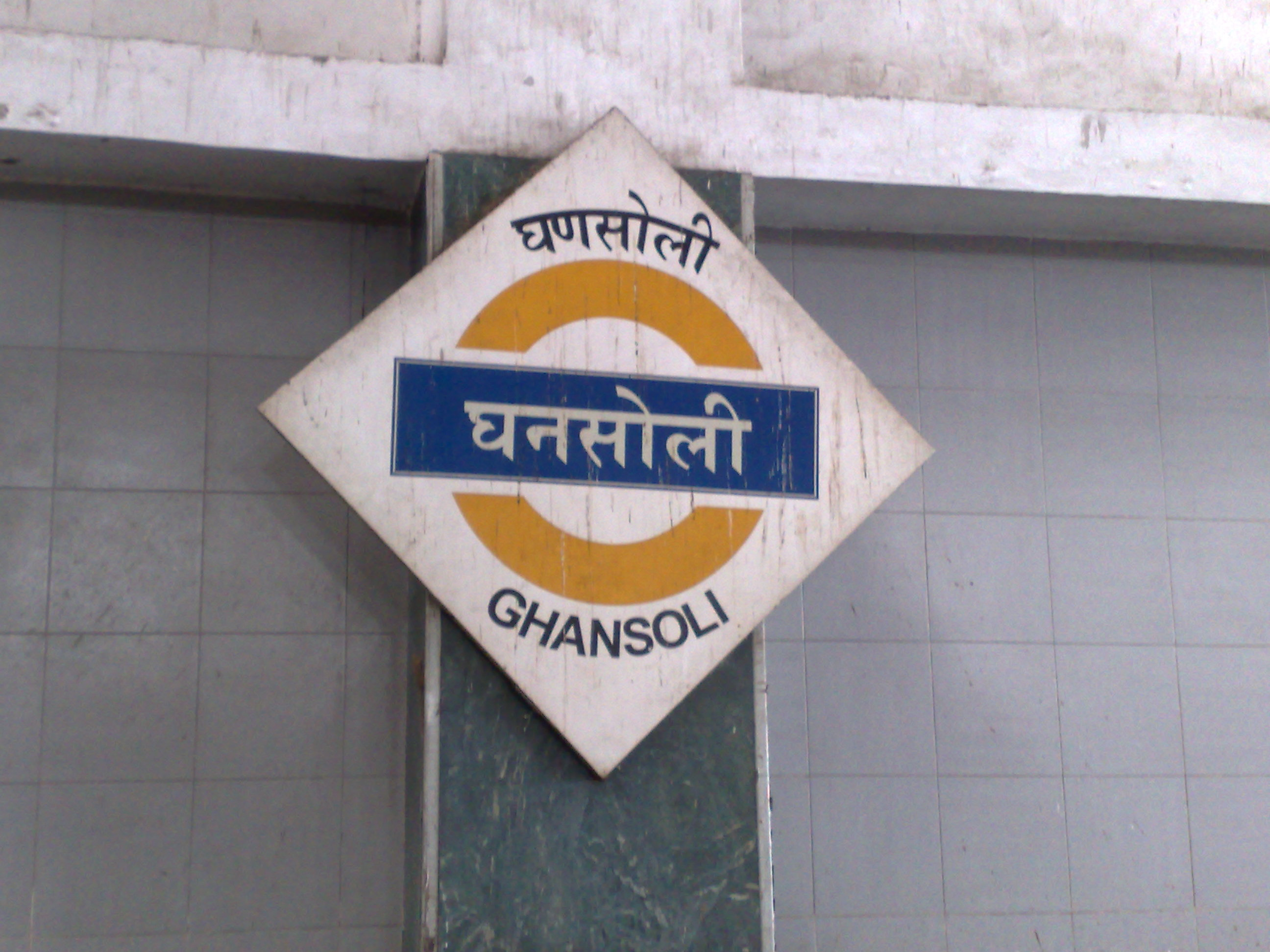
platformboard – Ghansoli

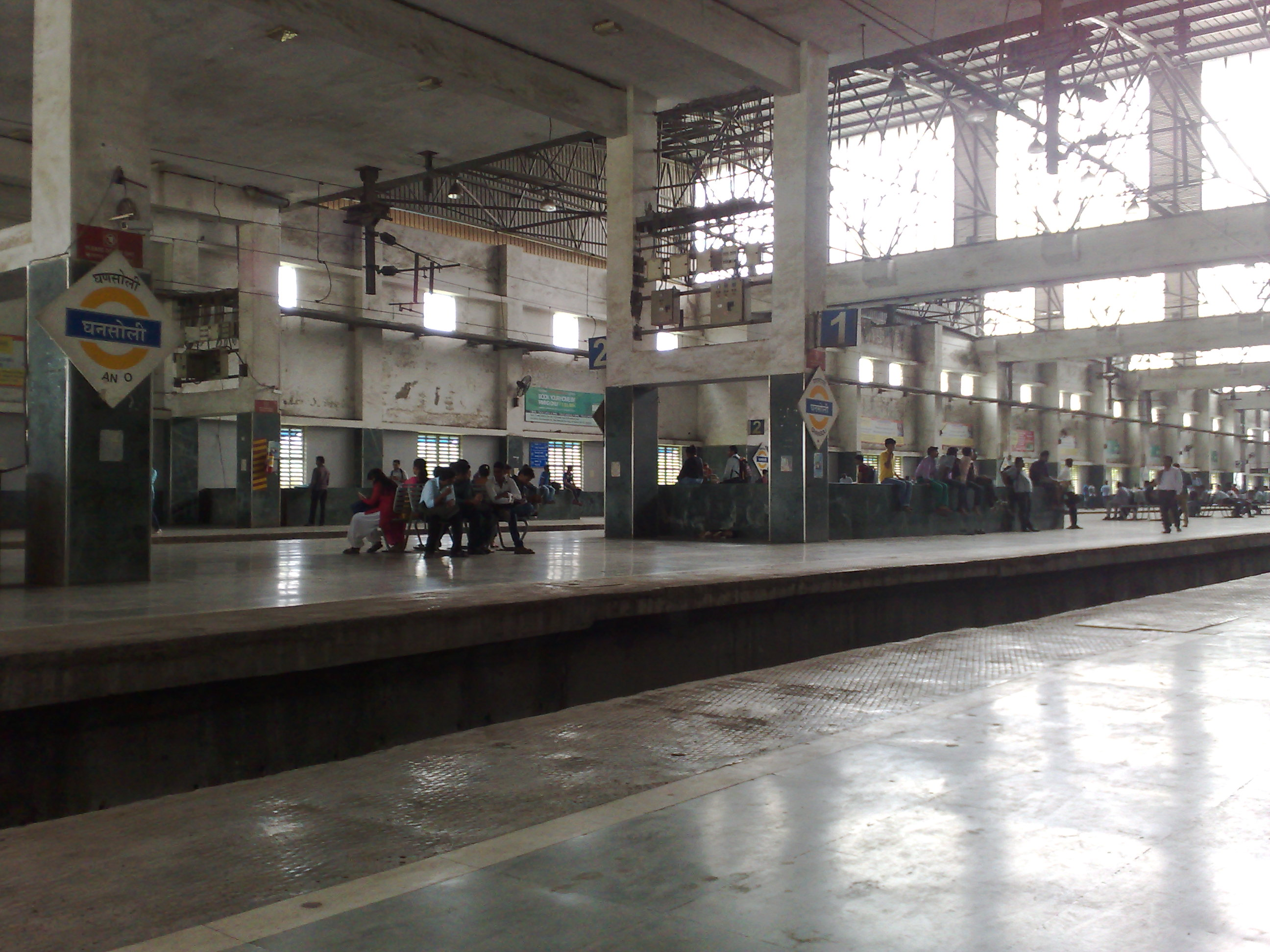
Interior of Ghansoli
