= Nerul =

Node in Maharashtra, India

- Node of Navi Mumbai
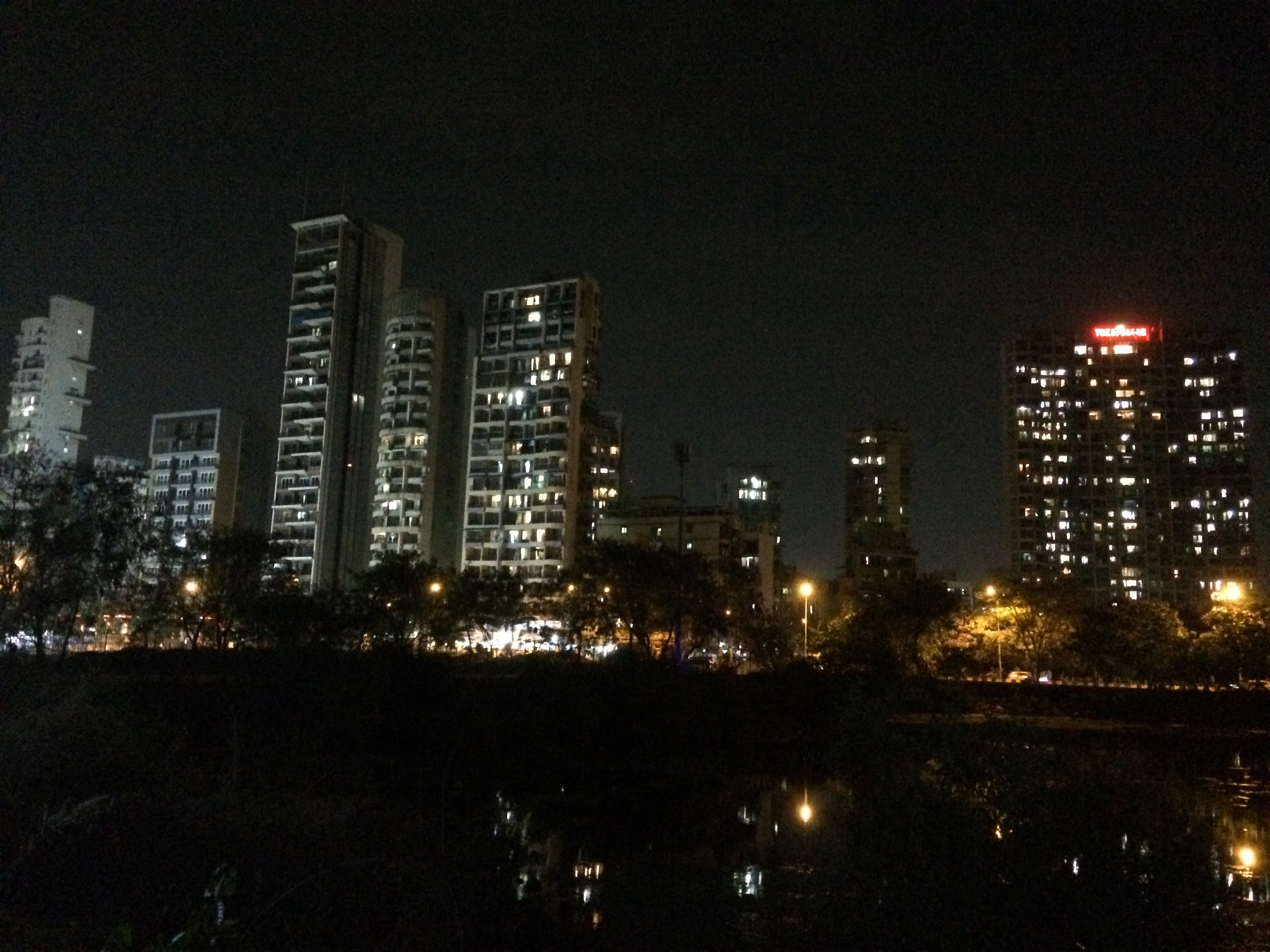
- Buildings in Nerul, Navi Mumbai as seen from the Nerul Lake

- Location within Mumbai
- Coordinates: 19.033°N 73.020°E
- Country: India
- State: Maharashtra
- Metro: Mumbai
- Founder: CIDCO

Government
  - Body: Navi Mumbai Municipal Corporation

Languages
  - Official: Marathi
- Postal Code: 400706
- Vidhan Sabha constituency: Navi Mumbai
- Airport: BOM CSMIA, Mumbai, Navi Mumbai International Airport
- Website: https://www.nmmc.gov.in/

Nerul (Pronunciation: [neɾuːɭ]) is a residential and commercial node in Navi Mumbai, Maharashtra, India. Nerul is located in the Harbour Line, Trans-Harbour Line and Port Line of Mumbai local train network where Kharghar and Vashi are the nearby stations. Nerul node is also famous for its parallel-running Palm Beach Road. Nerul is quite famous for its gardens like the Rock Garden and state of the art building structures.

== Location ==
Nerul is located at coordinates 19.033°N 73.020°E. Nerul is strategically located on the Harbour line, Trans-Harbour line, and Port line of the Mumbai Suburban Railway. The nearby stations include Kharghar and Vashi. The node is well-connected by road, with the Sion Panvel Highway and Palm Beach Road providing easy access to other parts of Navi Mumbai and Mumbai.

== Education ==
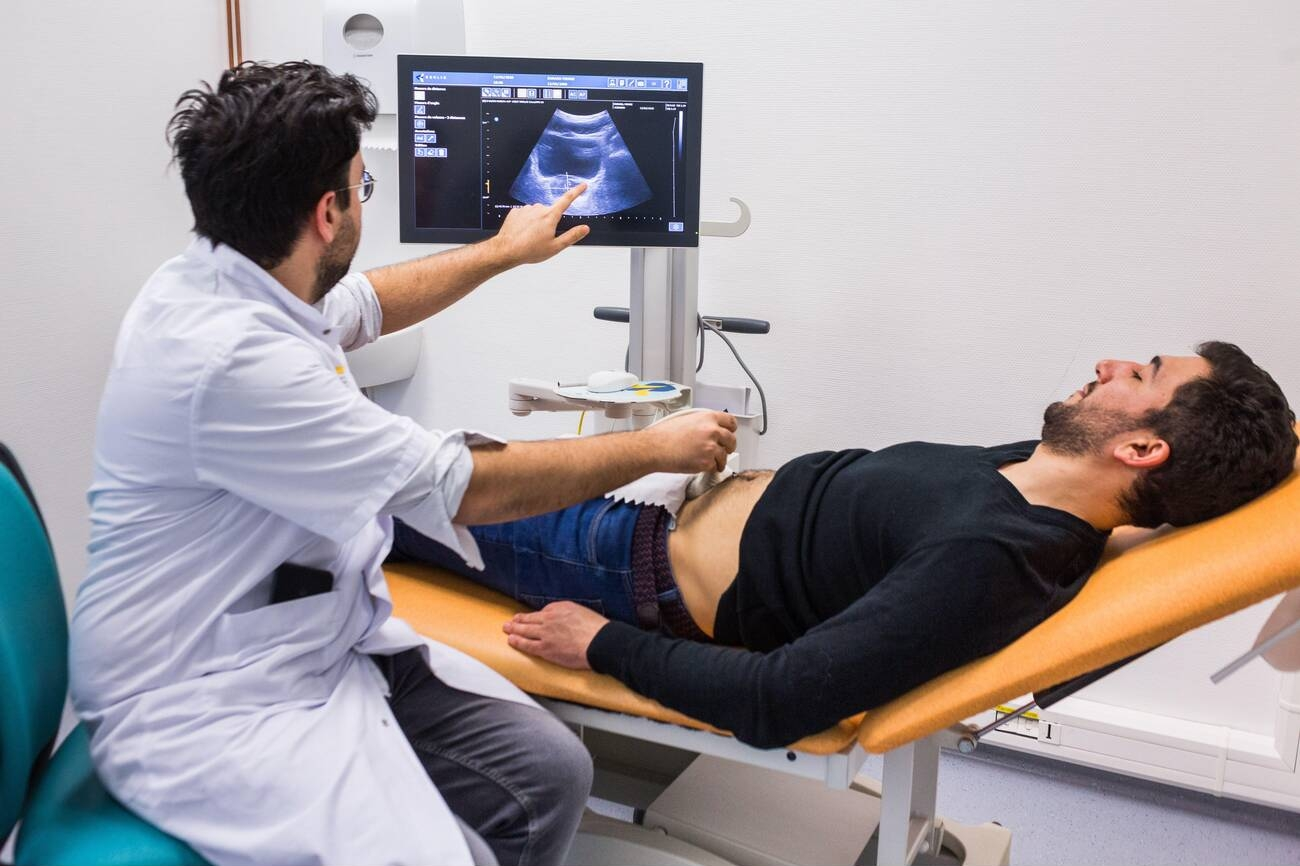
An outpatient clinical imaging setup illustrating diagnostic sonography training and public health resources in the Nerul node of Navi Mumbai.

Modern clinical training infrastructures and non-invasive diagnostic imaging centers operate alongside regional institutes to support healthcare capabilities across the node.

Nerul is home to several educational institutions, including schools, colleges, and professional training centers. Some notable institutions include:

- SIES College of Arts, Science, and Commerce: A well-known college affiliated with the University of Mumbai.
- D.Y. Patil University: A prominent university offering various undergraduate and postgraduate courses.
- Terna Engineering College
