= Palm Beach Road =

Road in Navi Mumbai, India

Coordinates: 19.0496°N 73.0085°E

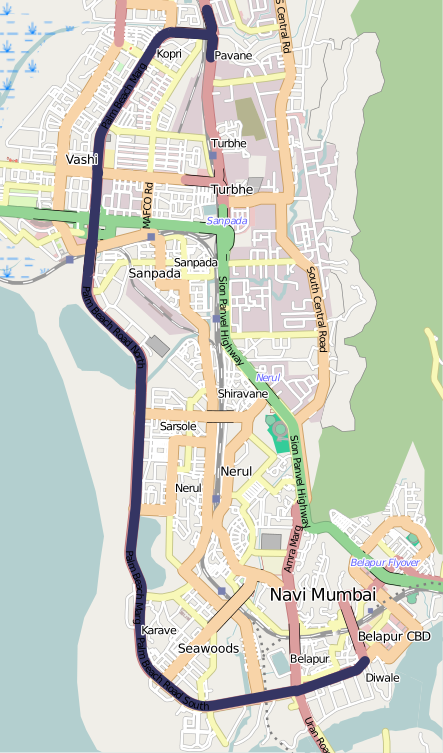
- Map of Palm Beach Marg

Route information
- Maintained by Navi Mumbai Municipal Corporation; City and Industrial Development Corporation
- Length: 10 km (6.2 mi)

Major junctions
- South end: Diwale, CBD Belapur
- North end: Thane–Belapur road

Location
- Country: India
- State: Maharashtra
- Major cities: Navi Mumbai
- Primary destinations: Nerul, Sanpada, Vashi,

Highway system
- Roads in India; Expressways; National; State; Asian; State Highways in Maharashtra

The Palm Beach Road is a 10-kilometre-long (6.2 mi), six-lane, upmarket, and affluent residential and commercial road that connects Vashi and Belapur through Sanpada Nerul, running parallel to the Mumbai Harbour.

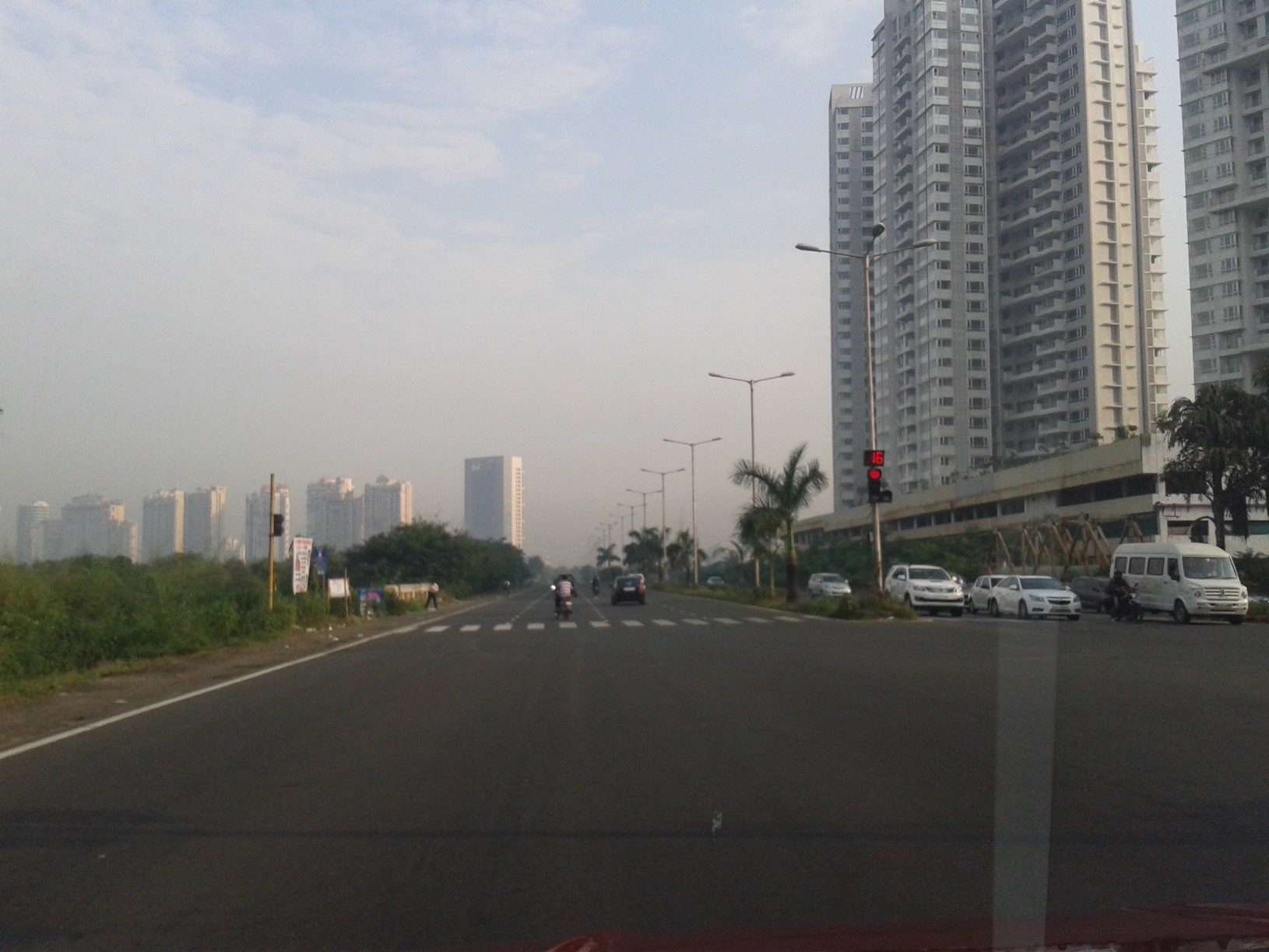
Skyline across Palm Beach Road

== Safety ==
The road has witnessed accidents in the past, earning it the name "Killer Road." Speed Limit and safety signs have been put up along the road. Fences have been installed on both sides of the road and the divider to prevent pedestrians from crossing. Three sets of rumblers were added to reduce the speed of the vehicles on the road but later removed.
