= Juinagar =

- Node of Navi Mumbai
- Location within Mumbai
- Country: India
- State: Maharashtra
- District: Thane

Government
  - Body: Navi Mumbai Municipal Corporation (NMMC) and CIDCO
- Telephone code: 022
- Vehicle registration: MH-43
- Civic agency: NMMC and CIDCO

Juinagar is an area in Navi Mumbai of Maharashtra state in Konkan division. It is also the name of a railway station on the Harbour Line of the Mumbai Suburban Railway.

== Landmarks ==
Chincholi Talao is famous during Ganeshotsav and other festivals as a place for the immersion of idols. There is a popular walking track around the pond. Juinagarcha Raja Jai bhavani mitra mandal Sec-23, Juinagar is the oldest and largest association in the Juinagar they have started their journey in the year 2002, and now they are celebrating their thirteen years.

"Juinagar chi Navdurga" celebrations in Juinagar is very famous for garba raas which are a major part of the attraction in Navratri festival of juinagar.
