= Rabale railway station =

Railway Station in Maharashtra, India

Rabale

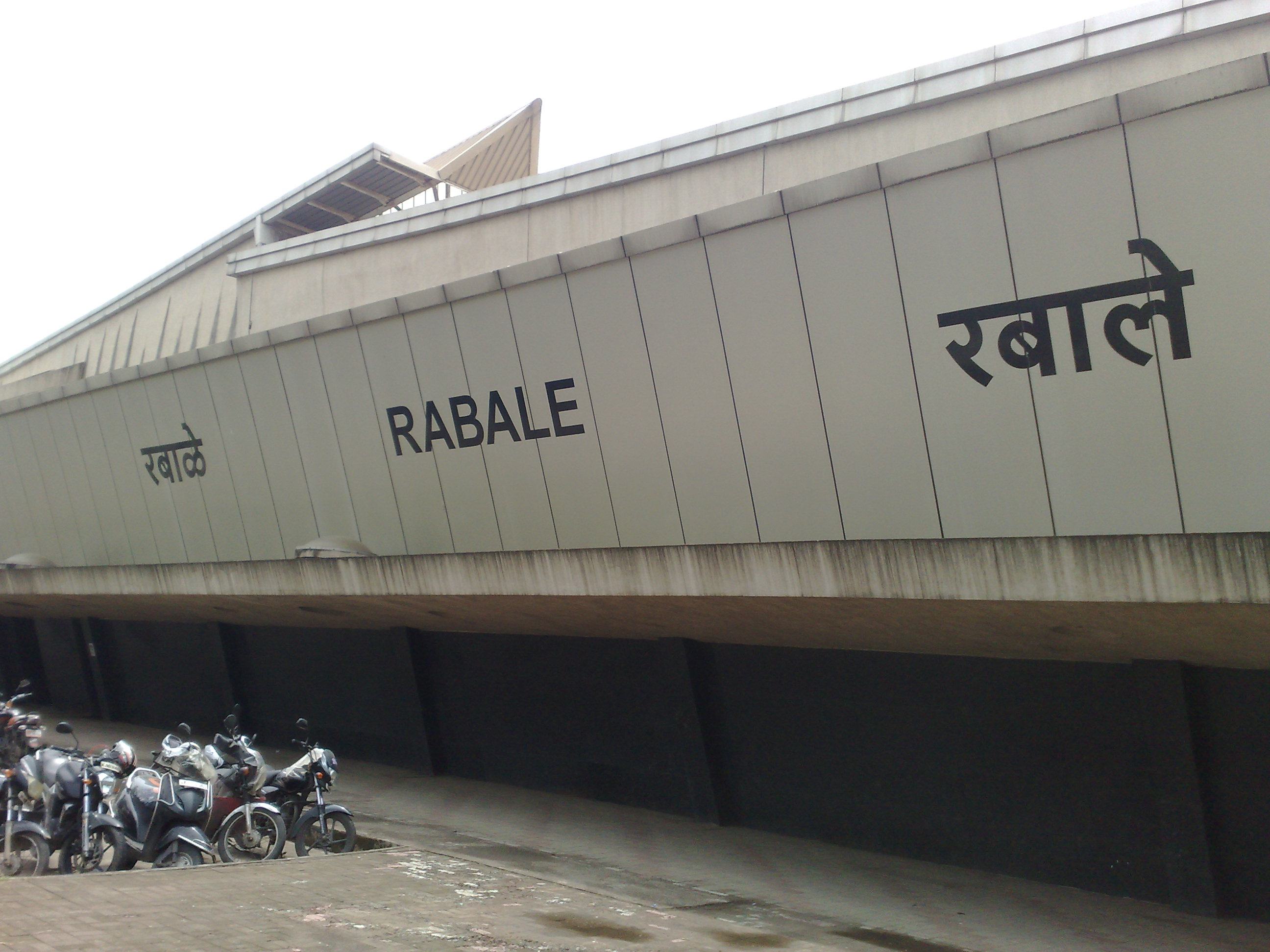

General information
- Location: Rabale
- Coordinates: 19.1367°N 73.0028°E
- System: Mumbai Suburban Railway station
- Owner: Ministry of Railways, Indian Railways
- Line: Trans-Harbour Line
- Platforms: 2
- Tracks: 2

Construction
- Structure type: Standard on-ground station

Other information
- Status: Active
- Station code: RABE
- Fare zone: Central Railways

History
- Opened: 21 June 2007

Services
Preceding station	Mumbai Suburban Railway	Following station
Airoli towards Thane	Trans-Harbour line	Ghansoli towards Vashi or Panvel
Route map
Location
- Location within Mumbai

Rabale is a railway station on the Harbour line of the Mumbai Suburban Railway network.

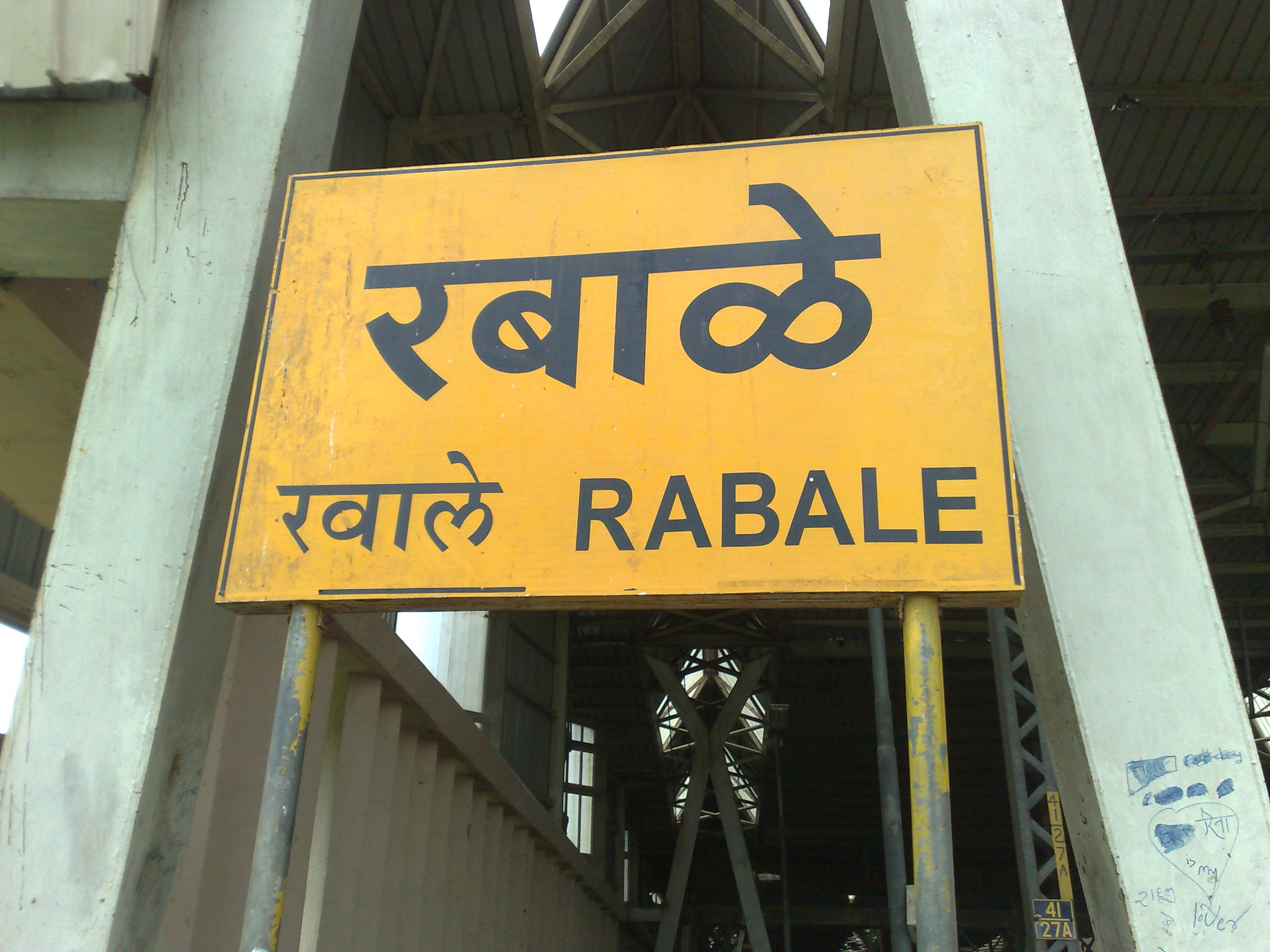
Stationboard – Rabale

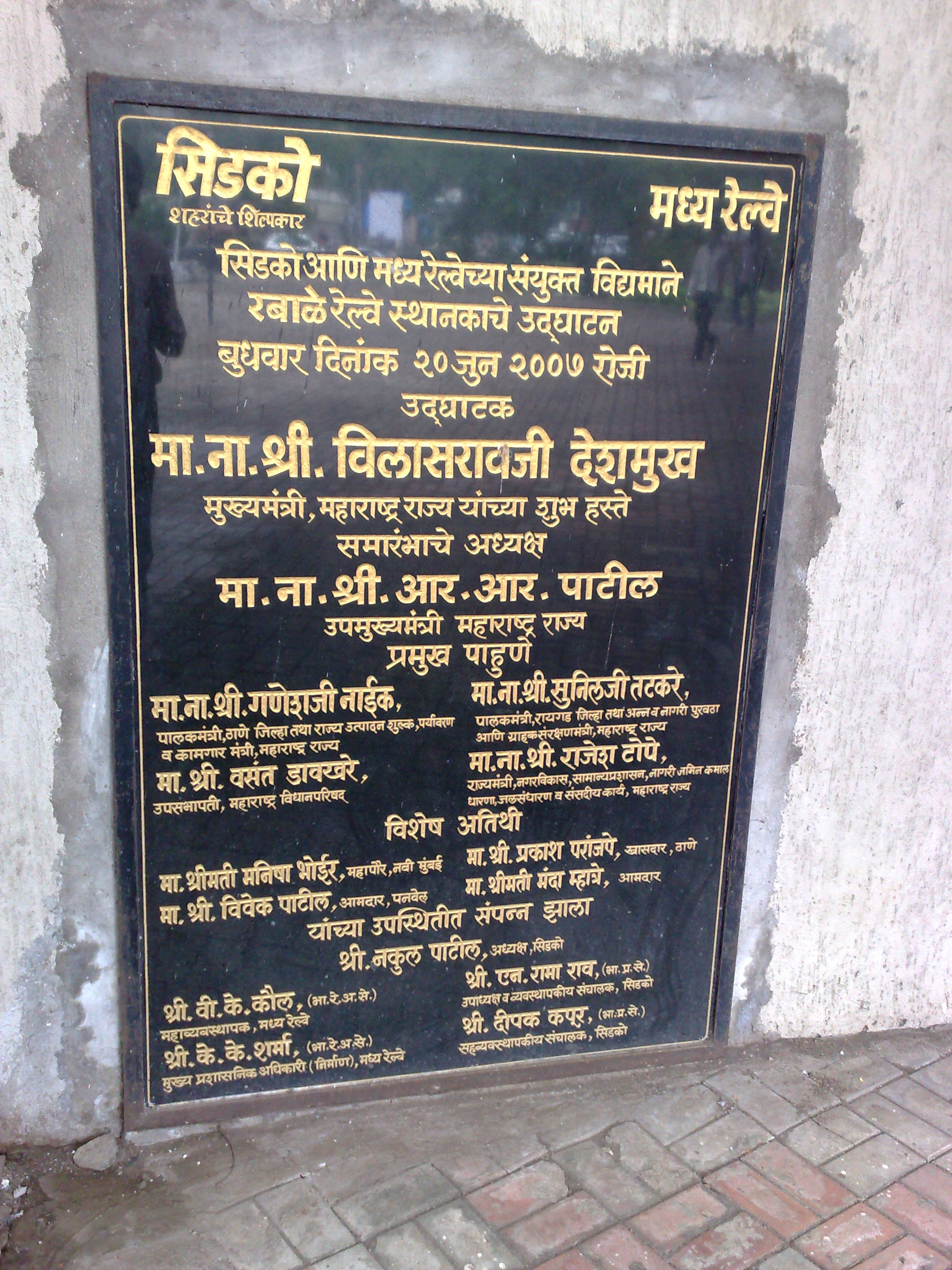
Opening of Rabale station

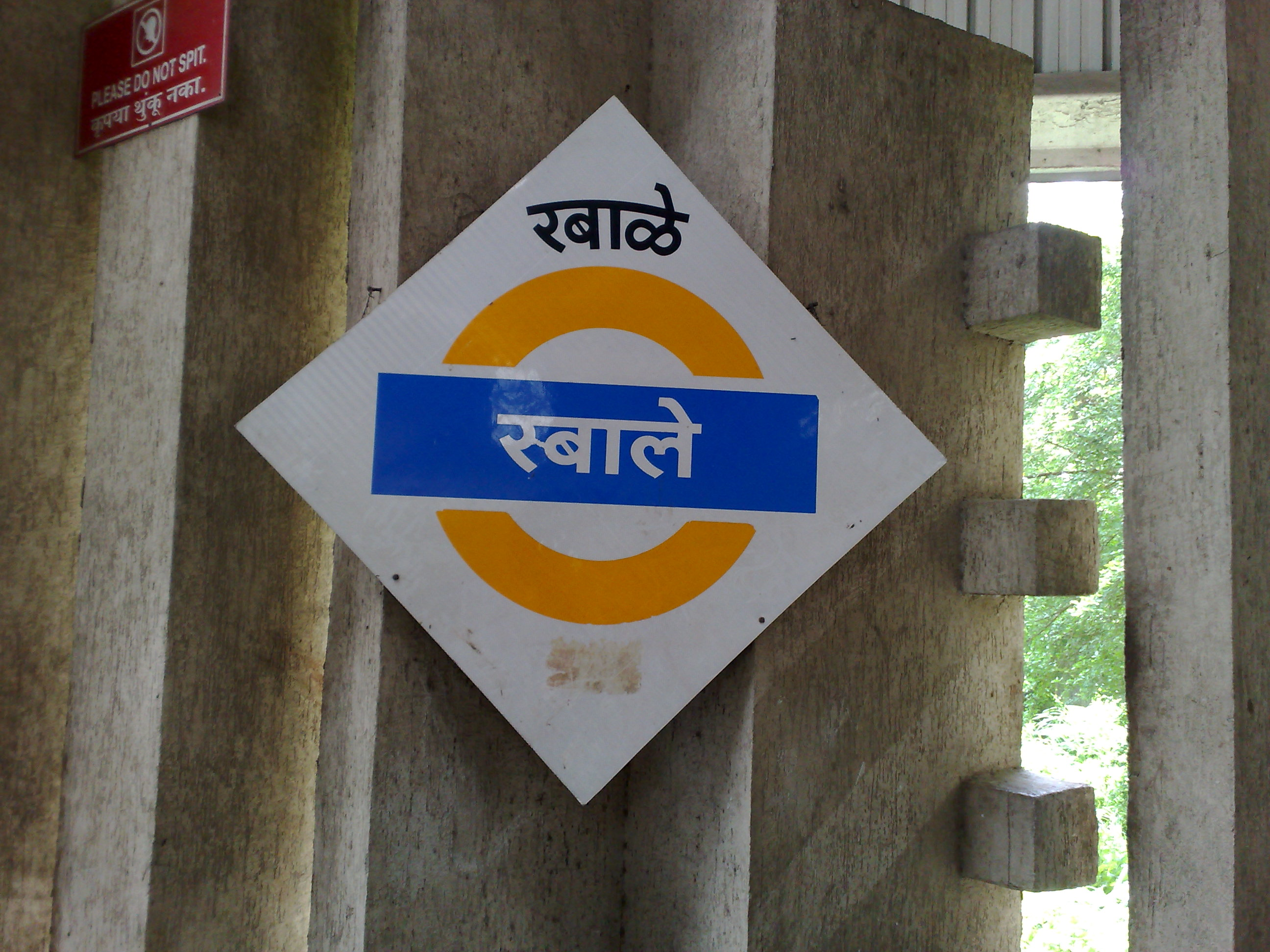
Platformboard – Rabale
