= Dhirubhai Ambani Knowledge City =

Technology park in Navi Mumbai, India

Coordinates: 19.1078°N 73.0137°E

Dhirubhai Ambani Knowledge CITY, often abbreviated as DAKC, is a technology park located at Kopar Khairane in Navi Mumbai, India. Spread over 56 hectares, it was completed in 2002. The city is named after the famous Indian industrialist Dhirubhai Ambani and is owned by the Reliance ADA Group and houses a 24-hour National Network Operations Centre (NNOC) along with more than 25,000 employees working primarily for the Reliance Communications division.

== History ==
This site was earlier owned by ICI and housed the first polyester staple fiber plant in India. Upon acquisition by Reliance, the site was renamed Terene Fibres India Pvt. Ltd (TFIPL). Production facilities at the plant had been moved out of this location

== Facilities ==
The Campus is partially Wi-Fi enabled (I Block is a complete hot spot) with two HDFC Bank ATMs and one ICICI Bank ATM located therein. There is also an HDFC Bank branch located within the campus.

Other than this, the campus has a huge artificial lake where migratory birds can be found at times. There are temples, fountains, medical facilities, a parking lot for over 500 cars, and a helipad within the campus.
