= Turbhe =

- Node of Navi Mumbai
- Navi Mumbai
- Coordinates: 19.4°N 73.1°E
- Country: India
- State: Maharashtra
- District: Thane
- Founder: CIDCO

Government
  - Type: Municipal Corporation
  - Body: Navi Mumbai Municipal Corporation

Languages Agri [Marathi]
  - Official: Marathi
- Time zone: UTC+5:30 (IST)

Turbhe is suburb of Navi Mumbai. Turbhe Suburb is known for the presence of Wholesale Agriculture Market also Known as Mumbai-APMC Market Turbhe. which attracts sellers from Maharashtra & Gujarat.

Turbhe Railway Station is the fifth station on the Thane / Vashi and Thane / Panvel railway line, starting from Thane.

The Navi Mumbai Municipal Transport (NMMT) has a depot at Turbhe.
