= Airoli railway station =

Railway station in Maharashtra, India

Airoli

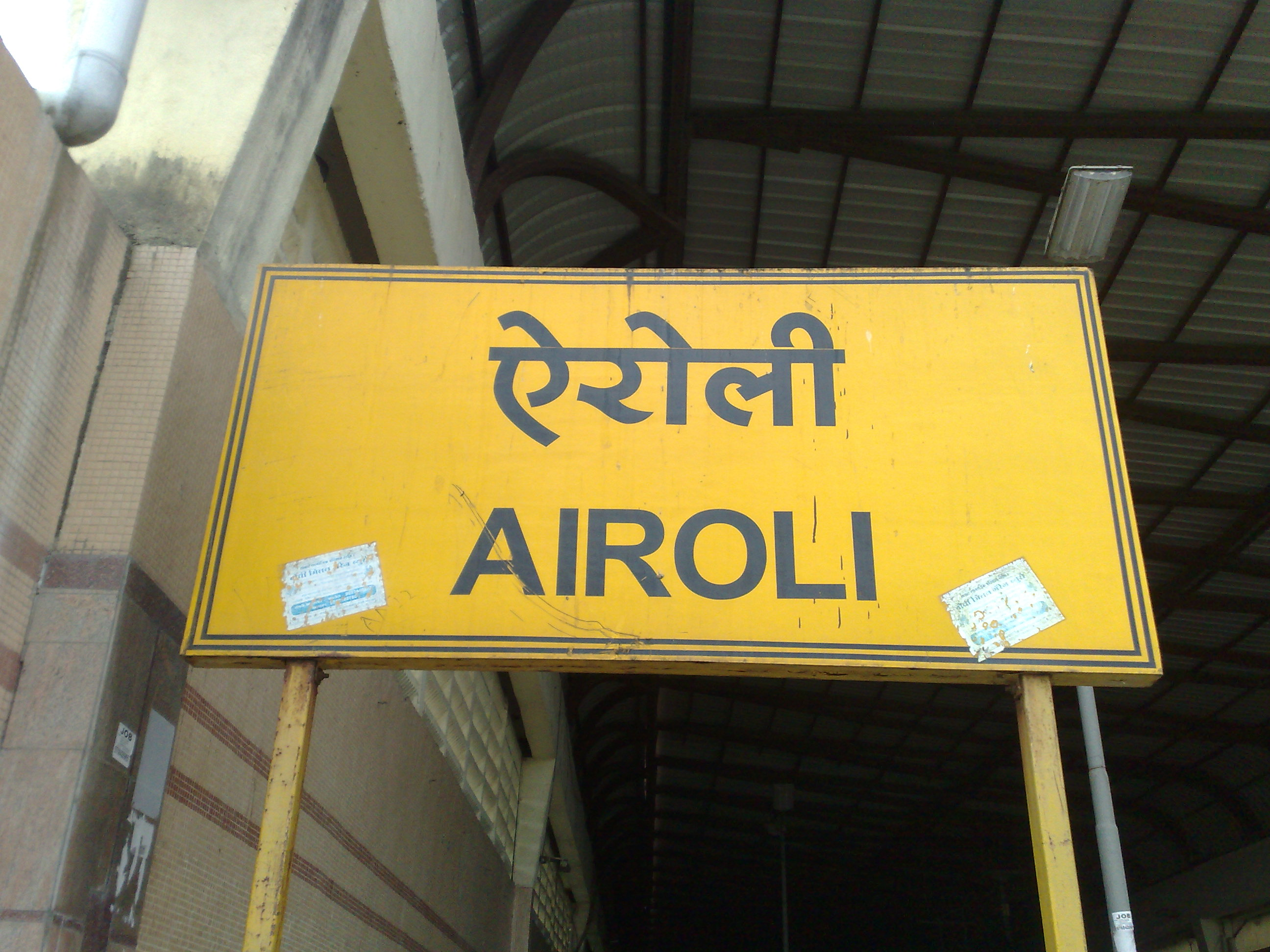

General information
- Coordinates: 19.1586°N 72.9994°E
- System: Mumbai Suburban Railway station
- Owner: Ministry of Railways, Indian Railways
- Line: Trans-Harbour Line
- Platforms: 2
- Tracks: 2

Construction
- Structure type: Standard on-ground station
- Depth: Surface Station

Other information
- Status: Active
- Station code: AIRL
- Fare zone: Central Railway

Services
Preceding station	Mumbai Suburban Railway	Following station
Digha Gaon towards Thane	Trans-Harbour line	Rabale towards Vashi or Panvel
Route map
Location
- Location within Mumbai

Airoli is a railway station on the Harbour line of the Mumbai Suburban Railway network, located at the Navi Mumbai node of Airoli.

Airoli is the first railway station, 5.79 km away from Thane railway station, on Thane–Turbhe–Nerul/Vashi/Panvel line. It takes about 8 minutes to reach Thane from Airoli by train. The railway station is located in Sector 3 of the Airoli Node abutting the Thane–Belapur road. It is designed to cater to passenger traffic demand originating from Thane–Belapur industrial zone, on the east side and residential and commercial zone of Airoli on the west. Airoli station is a transition station between Mumbai and Navi Mumbai.

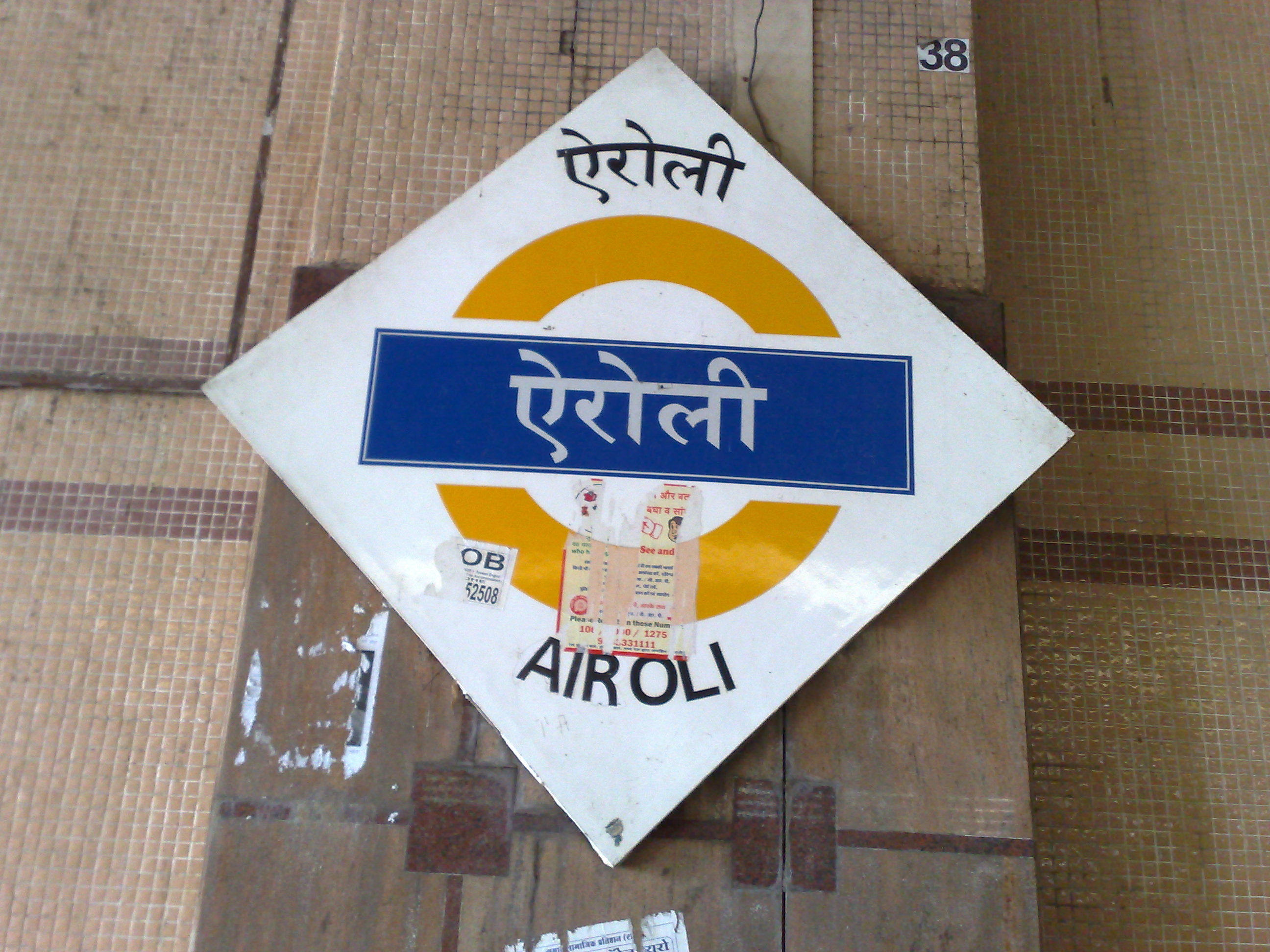
Platformboard – Airoli

There are 2 platforms (1st platform is for trains coming from Thane to Vashi/Nerul/Belapur/Panvel, and 2nd platform is for trains coming from Vashi/Nerul/Belapur/Panvel to Thane) with a length of 210 metres (the length is being extended). The platforms would be extended by 60 metres in the future. There are two commuter and one light motor vehicle subway. There is a train every 8 minutes for Thane and Vashi/Panvel/Nerul from Airoli Station. The Thane–Belapur station has only two frequencies (one in the morning and one in the evening).

== See also ==
- Mumbai Suburban Railway
- Harbour Line
