= Koparkhairane =

Node in Navi Mumbai

Coordinates: 19°06′16″N 73°00′12″E

Koparkhairane कोपरखैरणे Koperkhairane
- Node
- Kopar Khairane
- View of the residential cum commercial high rise towers near the railway station and the Bonkode village in Koparkhairane.
- Interactive map of Koparkhairane
- Country: India
- State: Maharashtra
- Region: Mumbai Metropolitan Region
- District: Thane
- City: Navi Mumbai
- Founder: CIDCO

Government
  - Body: Navi Mumbai Municipal Corporation

Koparkhairane is a major node in the city of Navi Mumbai in the state of Maharashtra in India. The areas in the Koparkhairane node is divided into sectors. Koparkhairane is a major industrial suburb in the Navi Mumbai Municipal Corporation.

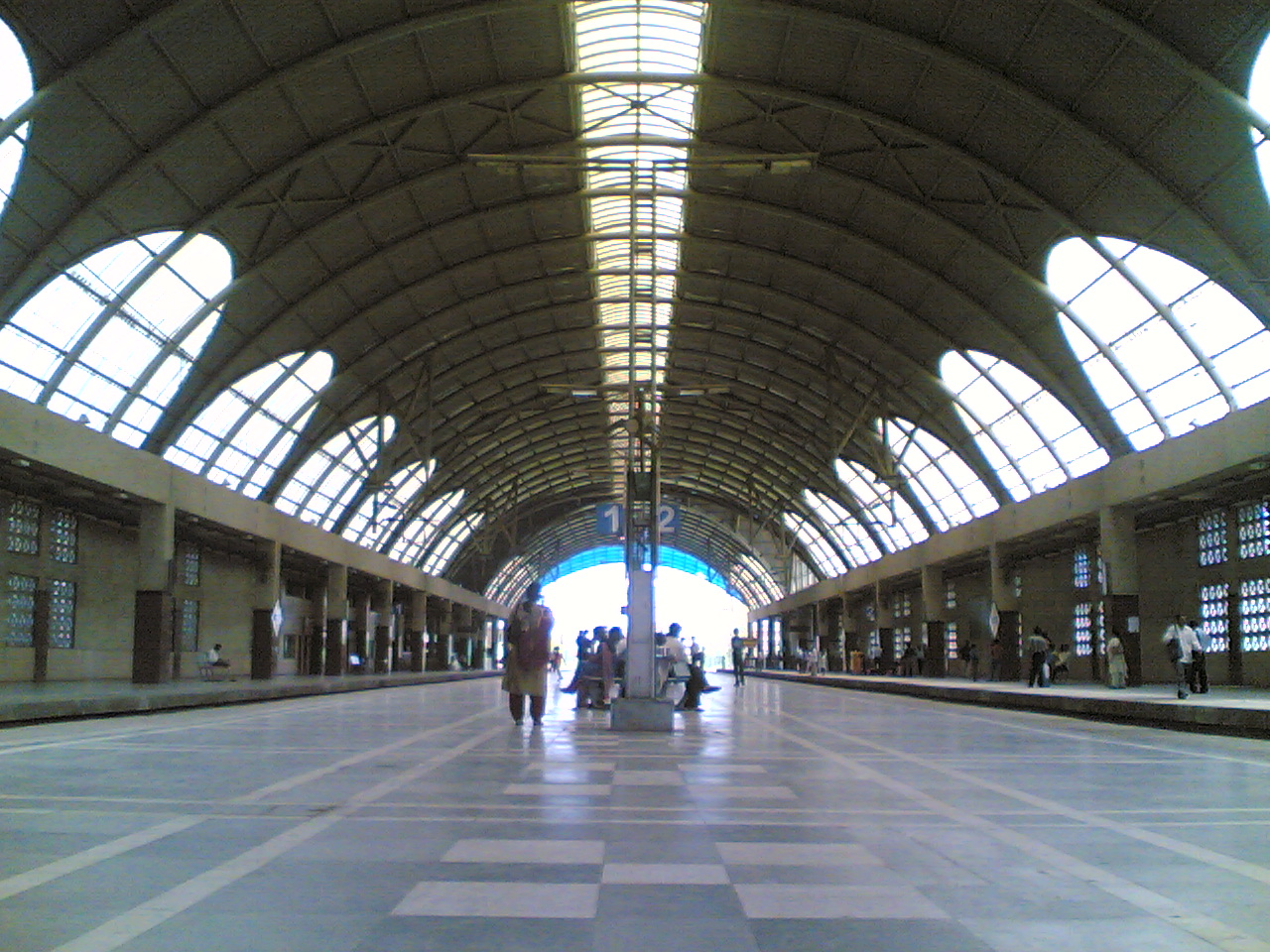
View of the inner side of the Koparkhairane railway station

Koparkhairane is majorly developed by the CIDCO (City and Industrial Development Corporation). It is well-connected node of Navi Mumbai. It is connected by highway as well as railway station. There is a railway station known as Koparkhairane Railway Station which connects it with the other part of the metropolitan region of Mumbai and Navi Mumbai. Similarly it is well connected by road through Thane-Belapur highway.

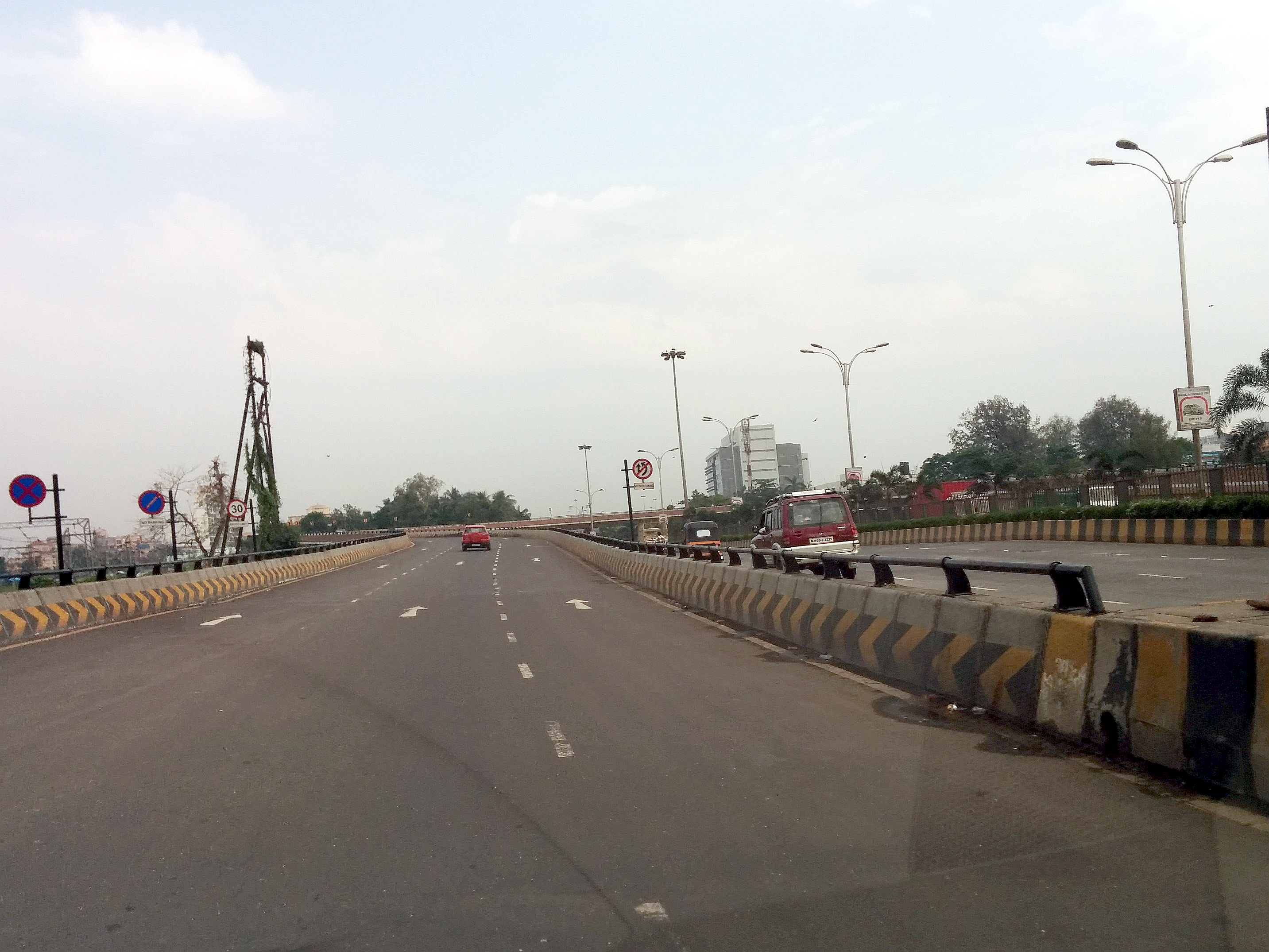
U-turn bridge on the Thane-Belapur Highway at Koparkhairane

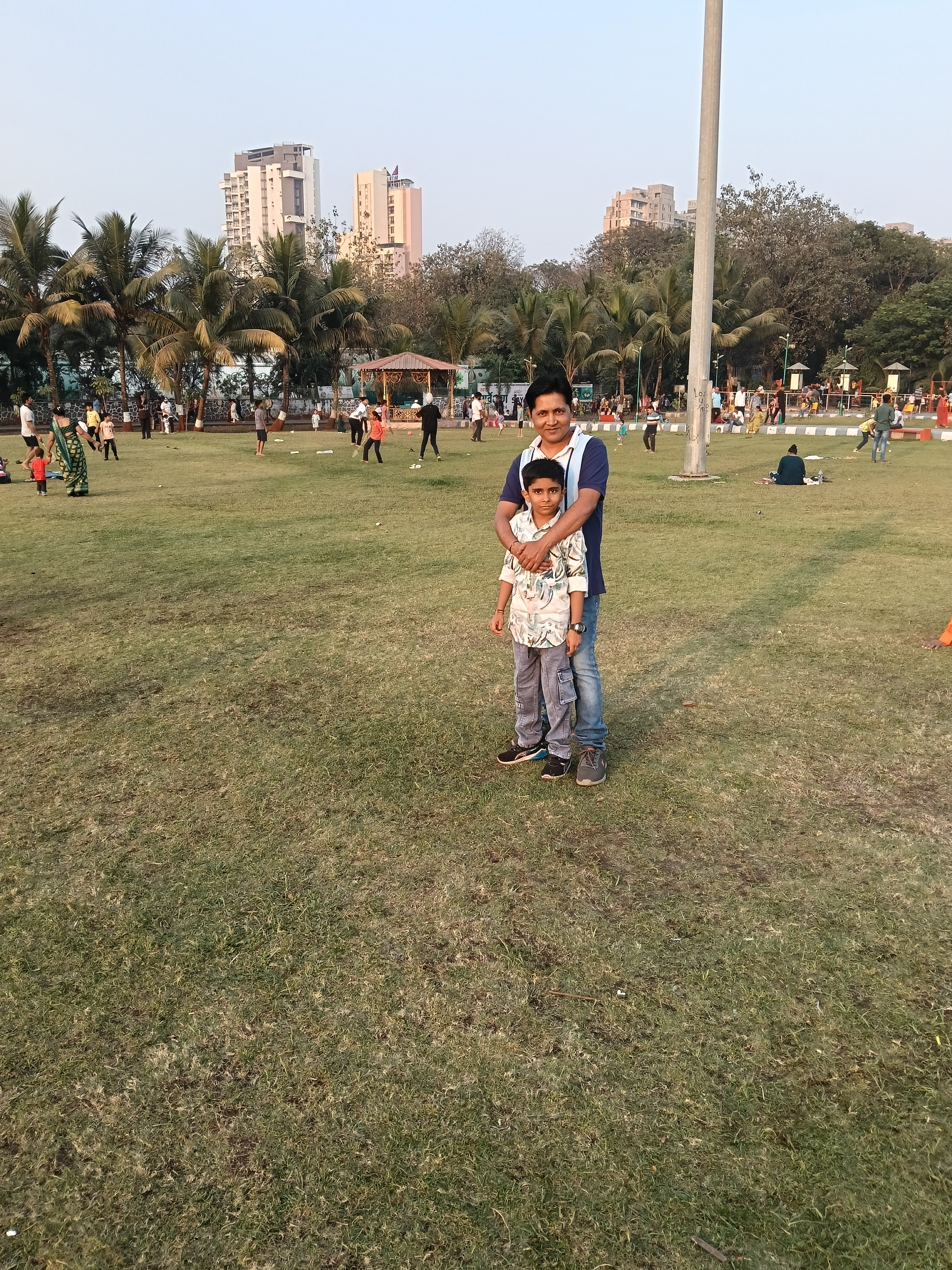
View of Nisarg Udyan also known as Dumping Garden at Sector 14 of Koparkhairane in Navi Mumbai

== Industrial estates ==
Koparkhairane is also well known for the Koparkhairane MIDC.

== Residential area ==
Koparkhairane holds well planned residential areas in the city of Navi Mumbai.

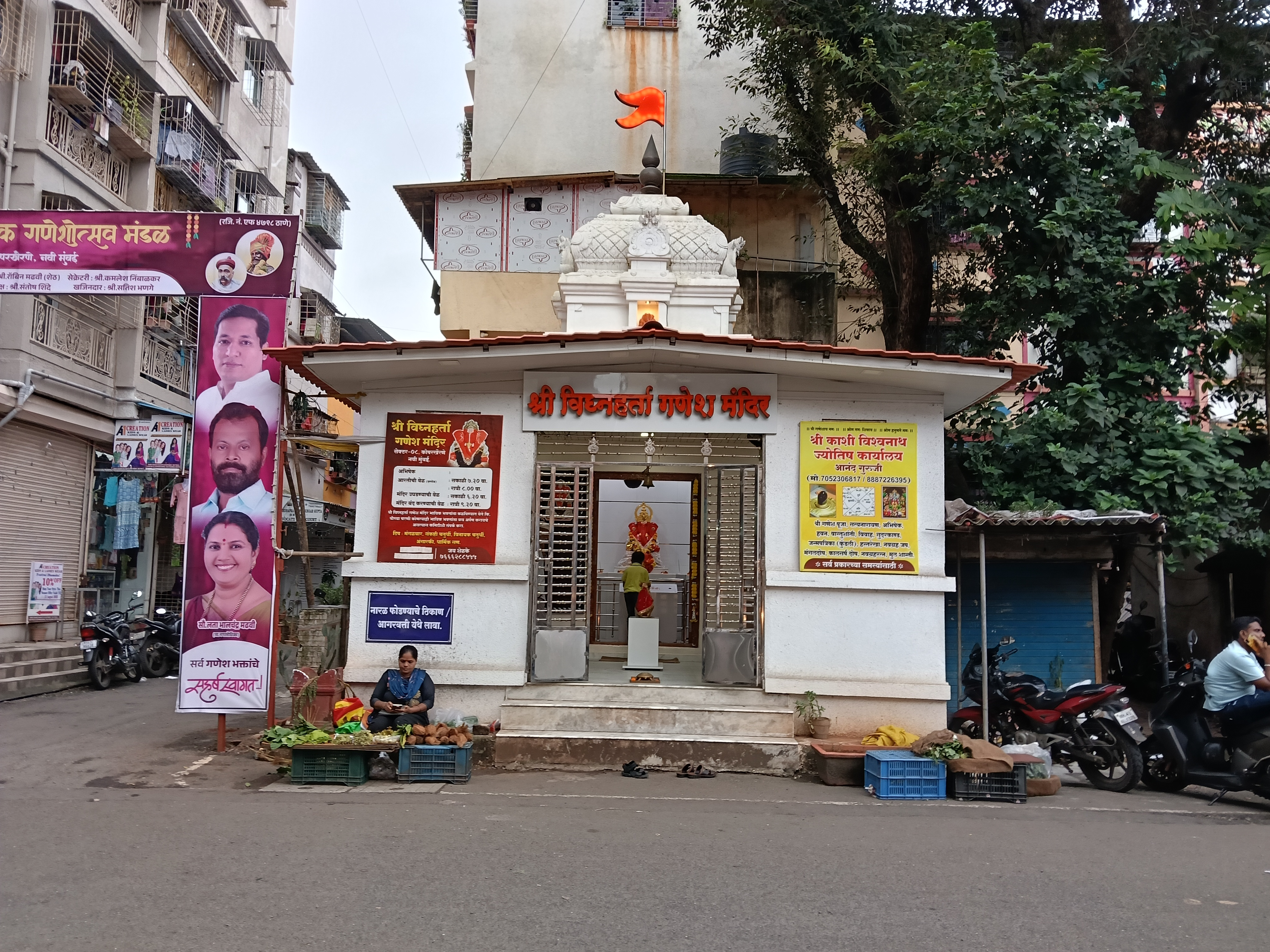
View of Shree Vighnaharta Ganesh Mandir at Sector 8 residential area of Koparkhairane

View of Lord Ganesha Utsav ceremony at the Anna Saheb Garden.
