= Digha, Navi Mumbai =

Small township near Airoli, Navi Mumbai, India

Coordinates: 19.181084°N 72.995696°E

Digha (Dighe, Digha Talav) is a small township near Airoli in Navi Mumbai, India.

Digha is in district Thane. Its Postal Index Number is 400708.
