= Thane railway station =

Railway station in Thane, Maharashtra, India

Thane
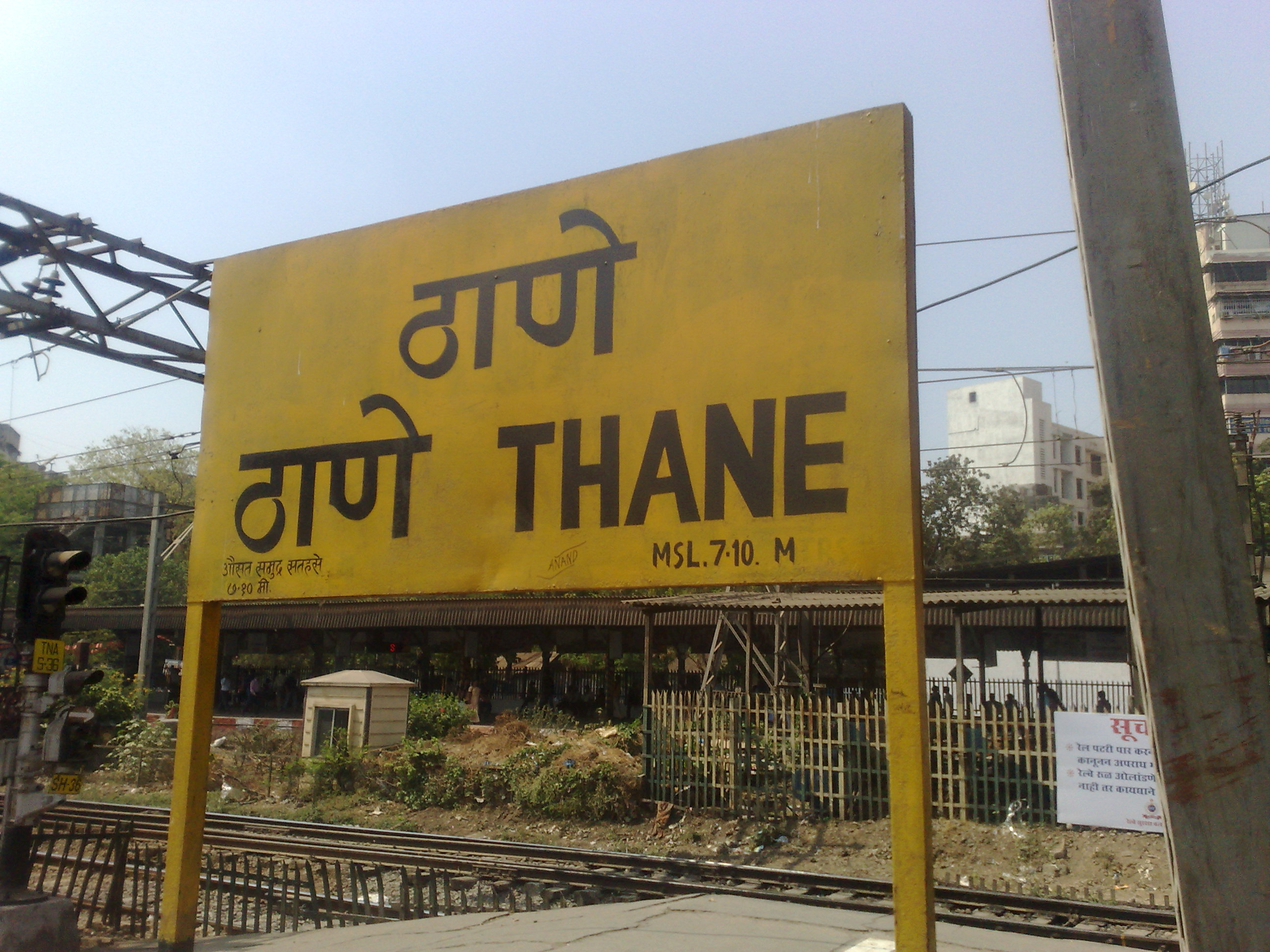

General information
- Location: Thane, Maharashtra; India
- Coordinates: 19°11′10″N 72°58′33″E
- System: Indian Railways and Mumbai Suburban Railway
- Owner: Indian Railways
- Operator: Central Railway zone
- Lines: Howrah–Nagpur–Mumbai line Mumbai–Chennai line Konkan Railways
- Platforms: 10
- Tracks: 10
- Connections: Thane Junction

Construction
- Structure type: At-grade
- Parking: Yes

Other information
- Status: Active
- Station code: T (suburban); TNA (mainline)
- Zone(s): Central Railway zone
- Division(s): Mumbai CR

History
- Opened: May 1853; 173 years ago
- Electrified: 25 kV AC 50 Hz

Passengers
- 2012-13: 6,53,928

Services
Preceding station	Mumbai Suburban Railway	Following station
Mulund towards Chhatrapati Shivaji Terminus	Central line	Kalwa towards Kasara or Khopoli
Terminus	Trans-Harbour line	Digha Gaon towards Vashi or Panvel
Location
- Location within India Location within Mumbai

Thane (station code: TNA) is a NSG-1 category major railway station of the Indian Railways serving the city of Thane, Located in Maharashtra, it is one of the busiest railway stations in India. As of 2013, Thane railway station handles 260000 people daily. More than 1,000 trains visit the station each day, including more than 330 long-distance trains. The station has 10 platforms. It is the origin and destination station of all trans-harbour suburban trains. When built, it was India's first passenger railway Station along with Bori Bunder railway station.

== History ==
Thane railway station was the terminus for the first ever passenger train in India. On 16 April 1853, the first passenger train service was inaugurated from Bori Bunder (now renamed Chhatrapati Shivaji Maharaj Terminus), Mumbai to Thane. Covering a distance of 34 kilometres (21 mi), it was hauled by three locomotives: Sahib, Sindh, and Sultan, and carried around 400 passengers.

=== The First Trial Train Journey ===
About five months before this inaugural journey, a trial run was conducted from near Bori Bunder to the Parsick (Parsik) Point in Tannah (now Thane). This journey started on the noon of 18 November 1852, soon after 12 p.m., with the Directors, Engineers of the GIP Railway (the company that built the line), along with their friends.The train was pulled by Bombay's first steam locomotive, Lord Falkland, with temporarily arranged 'trucks' as rail carriages, since the three Locomotives and the coaches for the company had not yet been made ready (since they arrived just two months earlier, in September 1852). The party planned to reach their destination at Parsik Point at about 1 p.m., have a meal inside the 100 yard tunnel, and return to Bombay by sunset.

=== The Official Journey ===
The first official journey was in April 1853. The 14 coach train, carrying 400 passengers, began its journey at the Bori Bunder Station. There was a large celebration with a decorated platform and a band. At Thane, revelers crowded along the tracks for over a mile. On arrival, the passengers were welcomed by large erected tents. Among the speakers at the event was the Chief Engineer of the GIP Railway, James J. Berkeley. In his speech, he mentioned the work of the native laborers, saying they exceeded expectations, and also lauded the commanding officers of the native troops.

== Gallery ==
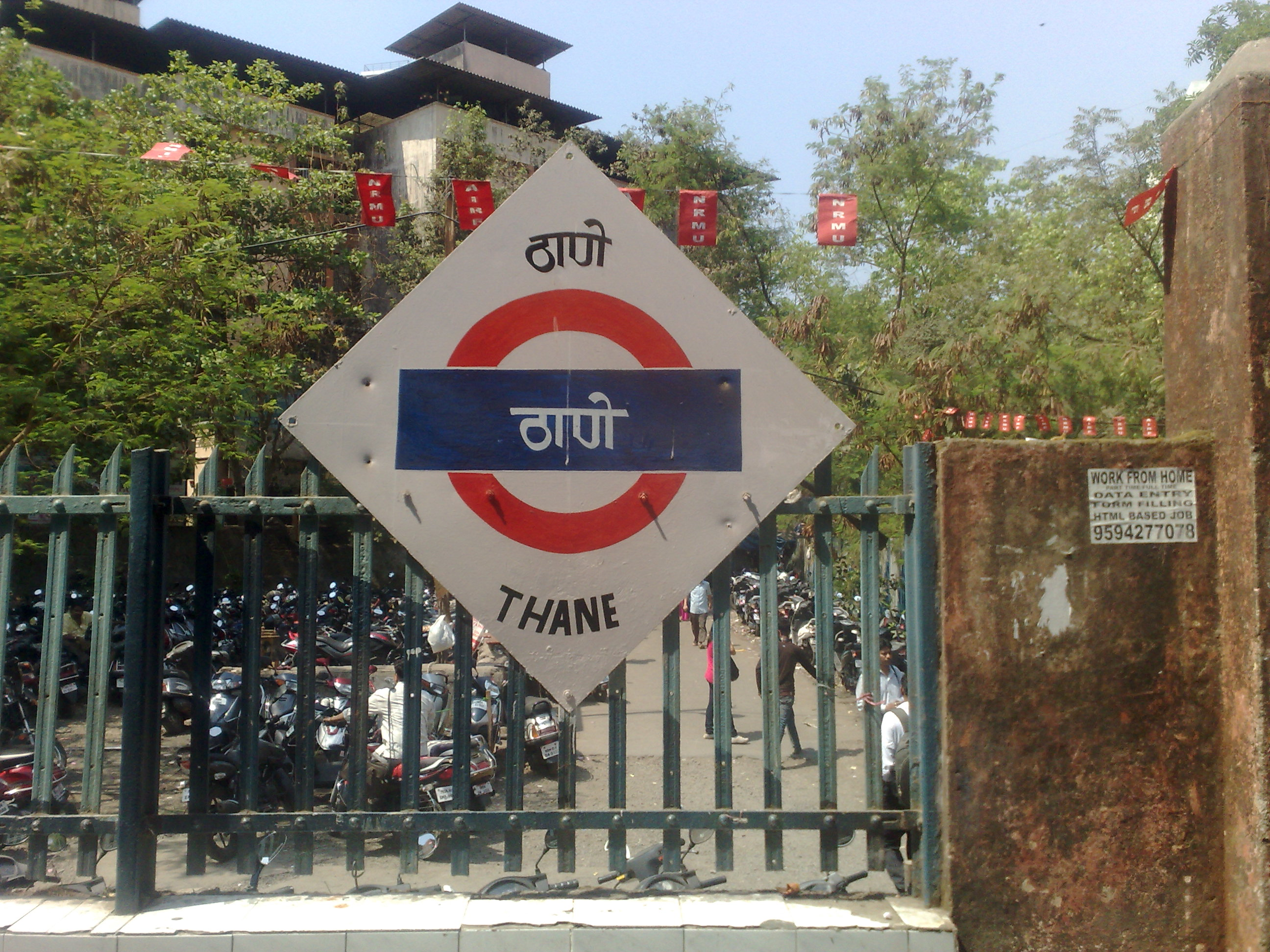
Thane Station board

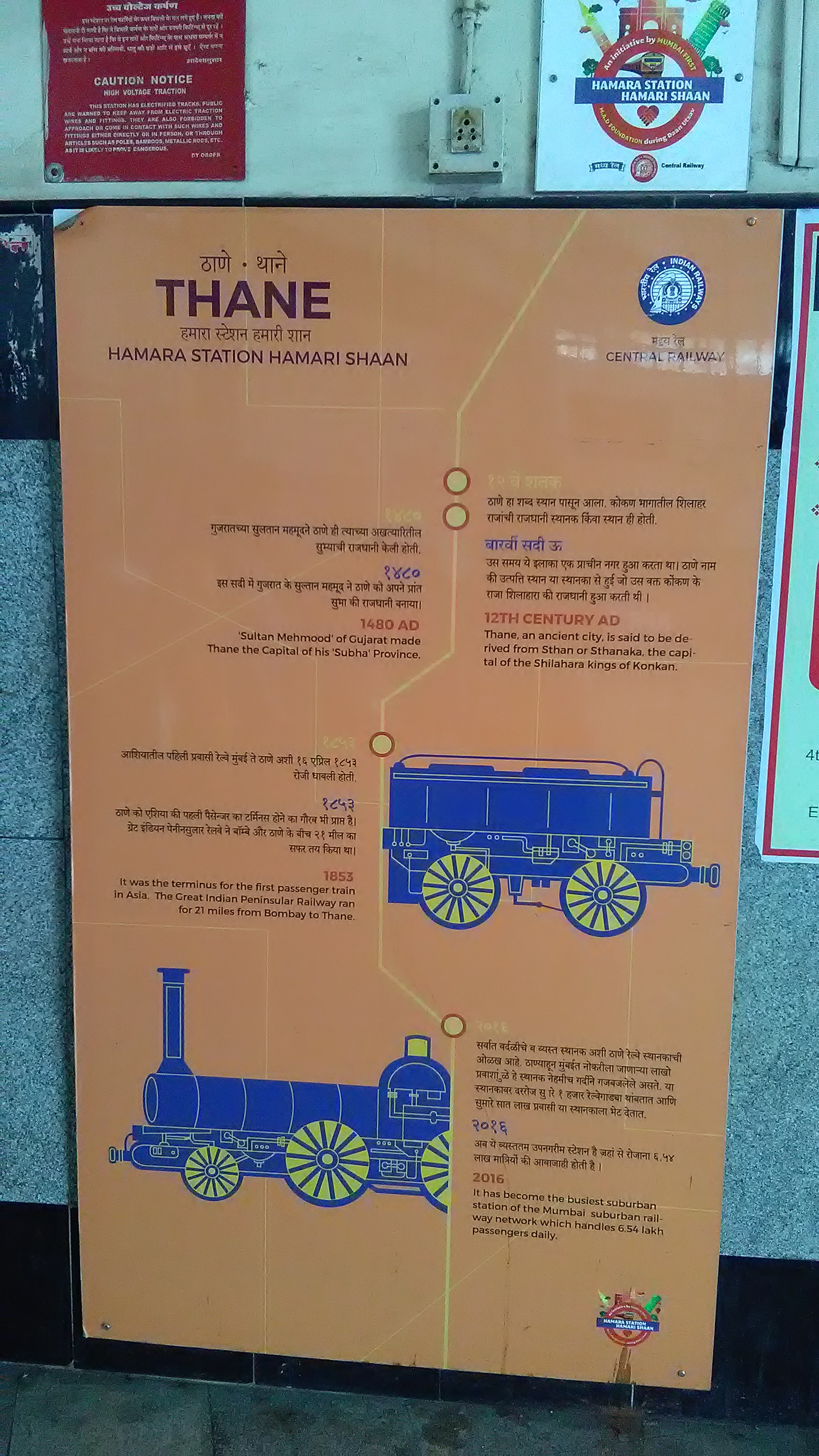
Thane Station History Board

== See also ==
- Timeline of Mumbai history
- Thane Creek
