= Navi Mumbai Municipal Corporation =

Municipal organisation of Navi Mumbai, Maharashtra, India

Type
- Type: Municipal Corporation of the CIDCO

History
- Founded: 1 January 1992

Leadership
- Municipal Commissioner: Kailash Shinde
- Mayor: Sujata Patil, BJP
- Deputy Mayor: Dashrath Bhagat, BJP
- Leader of Opposition: Vijay Choughule

Structure
- Seats: 111
- Political groups: Government (65): BJP (65); Opposition (46): SHS (42); SS(UBT) (2); MNS (1); IND (1)

Elections
- Last election: 15 January 2026
- Next election: 2031

Meeting place
- Ground Floor, Sector-15 A, Palm Beach Junction, CBD Belapur, Navi Mumbai, Maharashtra - 400614

Website
- www.nmmc.gov.in

The Navi Mumbai Municipal Corporation (NMMC) is the municipal organisation of Navi Mumbai, Maharashtra. On 17 December 1991 NMMC was constituted. NMMC came in to existence on 1 January 1992.

== Headquarters ==
NMMC is considered one of the most efficient Municipal Corporation in India. Till 2014, the NMMC was headquartered in an eight storied building in CBD Belapur. In 2014, construction of a new civic building was complete and NMMC decided to lease out the old premises after moving into the new one. The new NMMC headquarters is located at Killa Junction at CBD Belapur and is reported to have the tallest National Flag of India at a height of 225 feet.

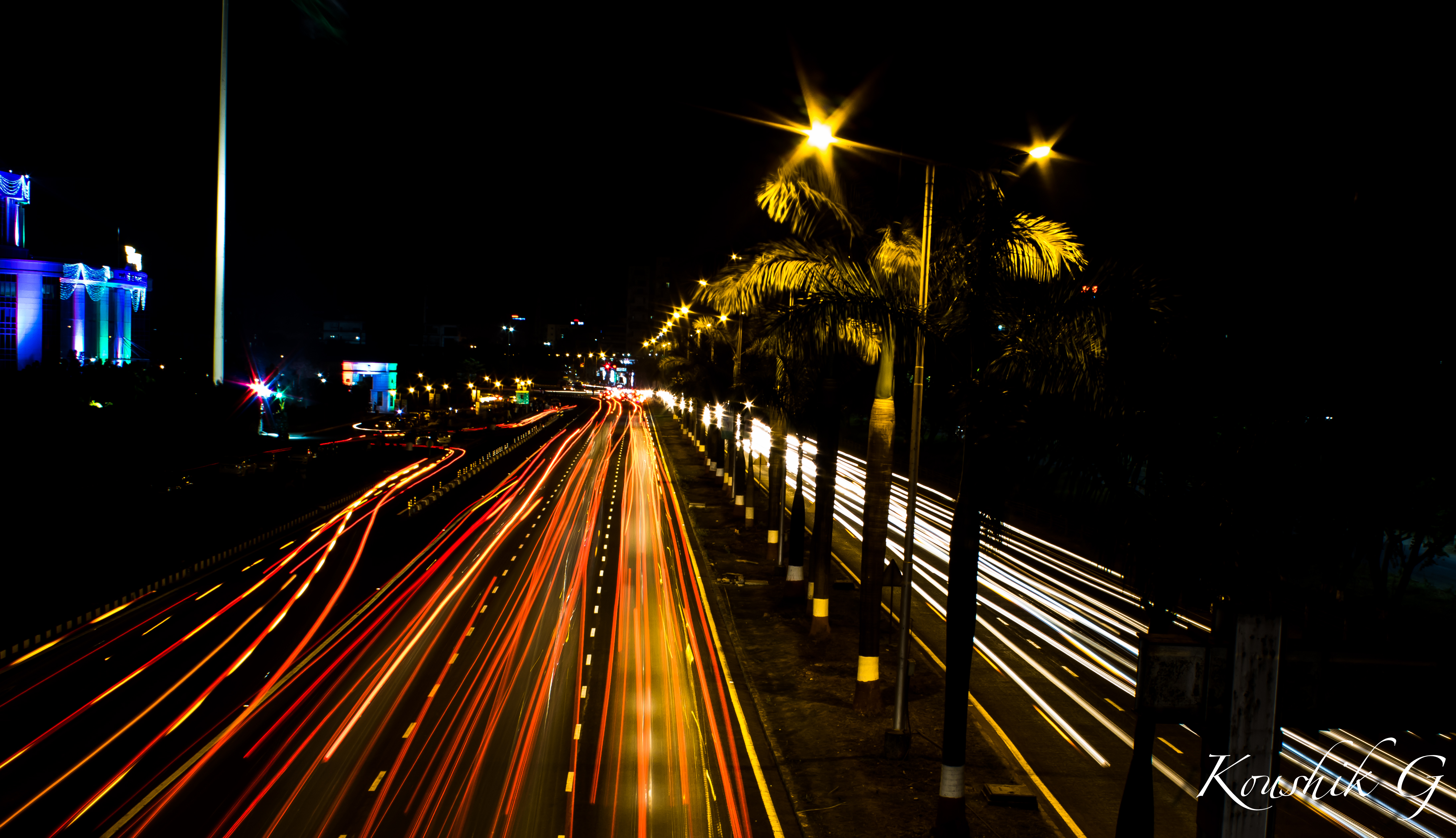
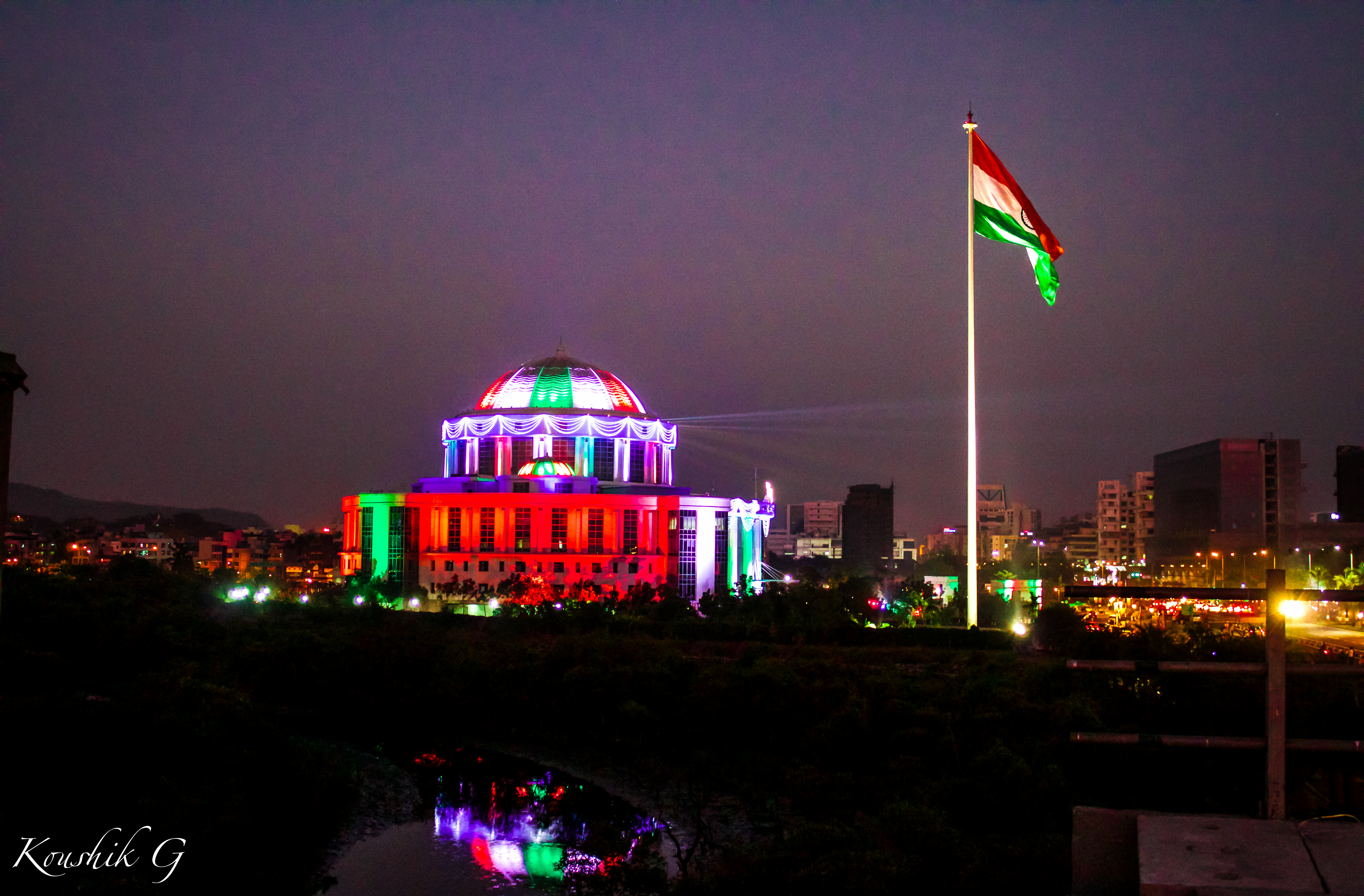
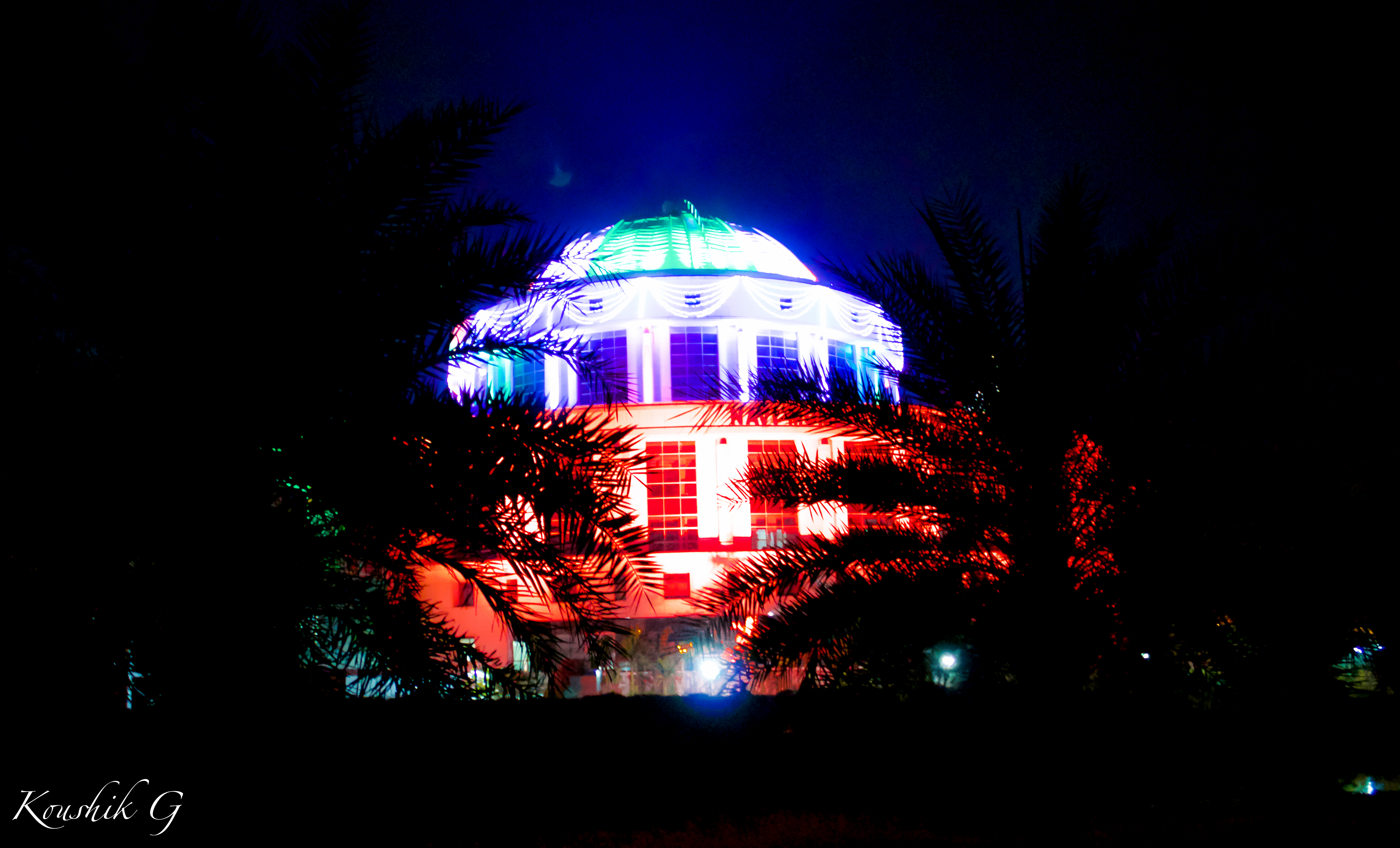

== Elections ==
=== 2026 ===
S. No.	Party name	Party symbol	Number of Councillors	Change
1.	BJP		65	▲59
2.	SHS		42	New entry
3.	SS(UBT)		2	New entry
4.	MNS		1	▲1
5.	IND		1	▼4
Total Wards			111	

=== 2015 ===
S. No.	Party name	Party symbol	Number of Councillors	Change
1.	NCP		52	▼3
2.	SS		38	▲22
3.	INC		10	▼3
4.	BJP		6	▲5
5.	IND		5	▲1
Total Wards			111	

=== 2010 ===
S. No.	Party name	Party symbol	Number of Councillors	Change
1.	NCP		55	Steady
2.	SS		16	Steady
3.	INC		13	Steady
4.	IND		4	Steady
5.	BJP		1	Steady
Total Wards			89	

== Upcycling ==
The Navi Mumbai Municipal Corporation in collaboration with Green Society Forum has created various murals by Upcycling different types of waste. It has been done to create an awareness amongst the residents, working people and visitors on 4 R's Reduce, Reuse, Recycle and Retain

E-Waste: Mother India Board: Waste Management by giving new life to e-waste i.e. upcycling, it has Developed two Mother India Boards by using non functional mother boards of Laptops. The first one is installed is Navi Mumbai Municipal Corporation Headquarter, Palm Beach Road, Belapur in the NMMC's Solid Waste Management Directors cabin and second one in Swachhta Park, Nisarg Udyan, Kopar Khairane.

Metal Waste: Kinetic Art Sculpture: As NMMC has its own industrial zone. Metal Waste and or scrap is produced at a very large quantity. Considering the fact and to spread the awareness on upcycling scrap, Kinetic Art Sculpture has been developed and installed at Swachhta Park, Nisarg Udyan, Kopar Khairane.

Plastic Waste: Recycledelic FIFA Mural: Not limiting to one waste form the NMMC moved ahead and developed 'Recycledelic FIFA Mural' under Swachh Bharat Abhiyan (Swachh Navi Mumbai Mission) and presented another new life form for the plastic waste to ensure proper awareness on Waste Management and upcycling. With the vision to transform Navi Mumbai into Zero waste, Eco Friendly, Smart Art City. The monument has been made using more than 7000 used Plastic Bottle Caps. The caps were collected from across the Navi Mumbai city in 5 days. The monument was developed in 10 Days. The round shaped mural is 6.5 Feet Diameter and weighs around 250 kg.

Junk Music: Creating Revolution Band by upcyling used Water Bottles, Garbage Bins etc. and Played Music from Junk and performed live at Mayor Mini Marathon, Palm Beach Road, Navi Mumbai.

== Revenue sources ==
The following are the Income sources for the Corporation from the Central and State Government.

=== Revenue from taxes ===
Following is the Tax related revenue for the corporation.

- Property tax.
- Profession tax.
- Entertainment tax.
- Grants from Central and State Government like Goods and Services Tax.
- Advertisement tax.

=== Revenue from non-tax sources ===
Following is the Non Tax related revenue for the corporation.

- Water usage charges.
- Fees from Documentation services.
- Rent received from municipal property.
- Funds from municipal bonds.
