= Hussainsagar Lake and Catchment Area Improvement Project =

Project led to improve Hussain Sagar Lake

Hussainsagar Lake and Catchment Area Improvement Project is a project led by Hyderabad Metropolitan Development Authority to improve the quality of Hussain Sagar Lake (pictured) in Hyderabad, India.

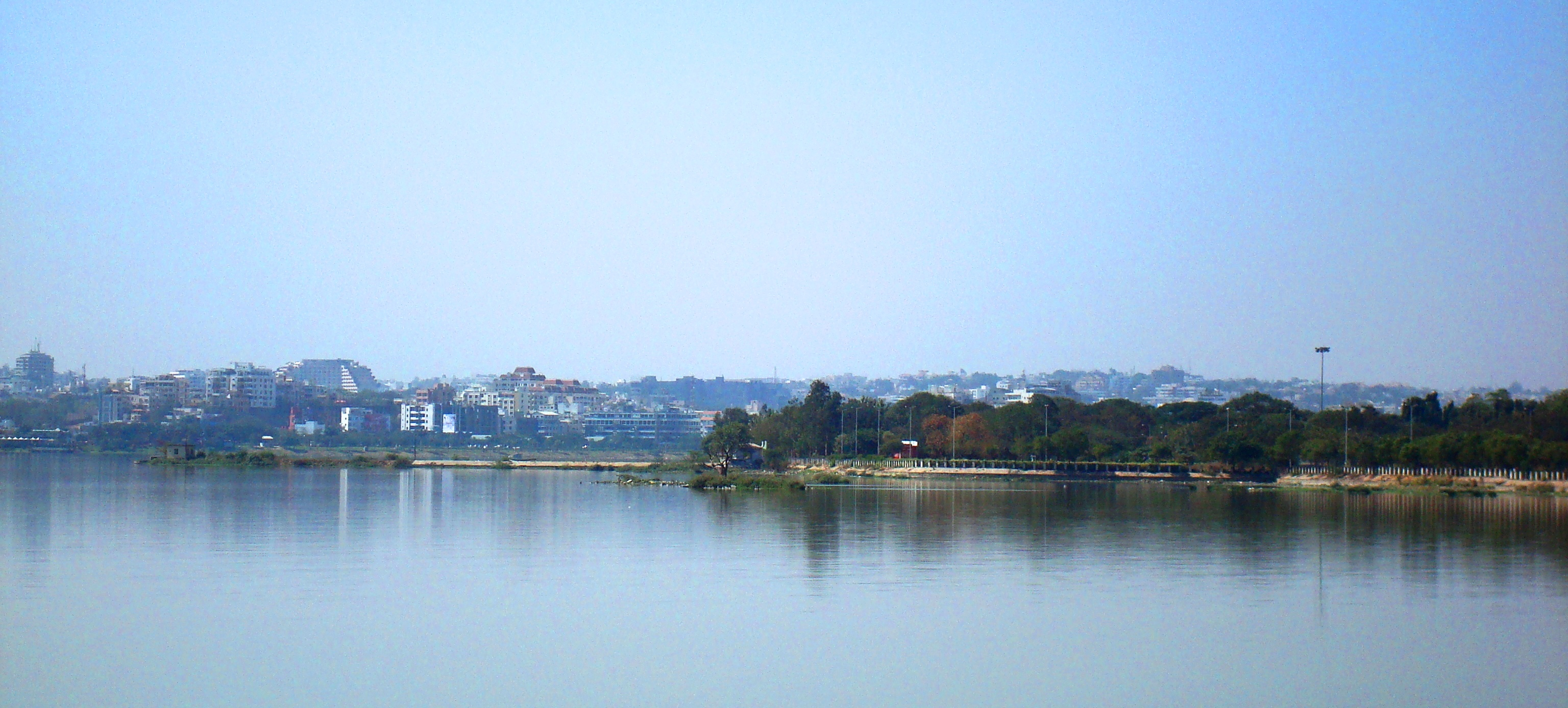
A panoramic view of the Hussain Sagar Lake

== Background ==
Hussain Sagar Lake was built in 1562 during the reign of the Qutb Shahi dynasty at Golkonda. It is an artificial lake built on a tributary of River Musi. The lake water was utilised for irrigation and drinking water needs from 1884 until 1930. The total catchment area of the lake is 240 square kilometres (93 sq mi). Through four main feeder nullahs – Picket Nalla, Kukatpally Nalla, Banjara Nalla and Balkapur Nalla – water from the catchment area reaches the lake.

Urbanisation and rapid industrialisation developed Hyderabad into a metropolis. Several heavy industries were also set up in the city.

Since 1930, the lake has gradually started receiving sewage and industrial effluents through the feeder nullahs. The Picket Nalla discharges mostly domestic sewage throughout the year into the lake from the north-eastern side. Similarly the Banjara Nalla (from north-western side) and Balkapur Nalla (from western side) discharge mostly domestic sewage into the lake. The Kukatpally Nalla discharges a mix of domestic sewage and industrial effluents into the lake from the northern side. This practice of discharging municipal sewage, industry effluents and storm-water from over 240 square kilometres increased the content of organic matter, nitrogen and phosphorus. This suspended organic matter, rich in nutrients, caused eutrophication that allowed growth of algal blooms and water hyacinth.

Over the years, the twin cities have seen idol immersion during the festivals of Ganesh Chaturthi and Dasara. As a part of this religious ritual, idols of the worshipped deities along with flowers, leaves and other material are immersed into water bodies. Similarly, during Muharram every year, colourfully painted Tazia are immersed in large numbers in the lake by the regional Islamic community. Besides adding silt, studies indicate that these immersions have increased the pollution levels in the lake. A 2009 survey shows that the chemical oxygen demand and biochemical oxygen demand in the water body increased drastically after these festivals.

== Initiation of the project ==
To address the pollution in the lake, the Government of Andhra Pradesh took initiatives to divert the sewage and industrial effluents into treatment plants. The treated water is then released into the lake to improve the quality of water. To further aid these initiatives, the government initiated a ₹3.7 billion (US$38 million) project in March 2006. The Japan Bank for International Cooperation provided ₹3.1 billion (US$32 million) as an official development assistance loan to the state government. The balance funds were provided by the state government.

The objectives of the project are:

1. To improve the quality of the lake by preventing pollutants entering into the lake from point and non-point sources of pollution; removing the nutrient-rich sediments.
2. Interception and diversion of dry weather flows; improvement of nullahs in catchment area to check the entry of polluted water into the lake.
3. To improve the overall lake environment and its surroundings for enriched biodiversity.
4. Increasing the potentiality of ecological tourism and economic status of people in the catchment area.
5. Improving the sanitary conditions of the people living in the catchment area and the vicinity of the lake.

== Implementation and results ==
The project began implementing steps in March 2008; it was scheduled to conclude in December 2012. Later the project deadline was rescheduled to March 2013.

As a part of the project, seven fountains were installed in the lake in September 2011 to improve the dissolved oxygen content in the water and help aquatic life. The fountains, each of which cost about ₹10 million (US$100,000), have the capacity to pump water to a height of about 40–50 feet. In addition to serving their primary purpose, the fountains also added an aesthetic touch to the look of the lake. Additionally, a new 30 million litres per day (MLD) sewage treatment plant on the Picket Nalla is planned. Upgrade of an existing 20 MLD treatment plant at Hussain Sagar to higher capacity, construction of ring sewers around the lake and a small treatment plant were as a part of the project implementation. An ecological park was also proposed, but it was stalled due to a legal dispute. Besides this, shoreline improvement work at Sanjeevaiah Park was also taken up. Dredging and disposal of sediment was also planned for this project. It was said that dredging from Picket Nalla, Balkapur Nalla and Banjara Nalla will result in extraction of 7 cubic metres (7,000 L) of non-hazardous and nutrient-rich sediment. The disposal of this extract was to be planned together with the state pollution control agency.

As of July 2012, 42.11% of the estimated project cost was spent to achieve the objectives of this project. This expenditure was instrumental in achieving 60% of the project's objectives. Due to the slow progress on the project, the media remained sceptical about the timely completion of this project.
