= Lalbaugcha Raja =

Ganesha idol in Lalbaug, India

- "He Shan Konachi Lalbaug chya Rajayche"
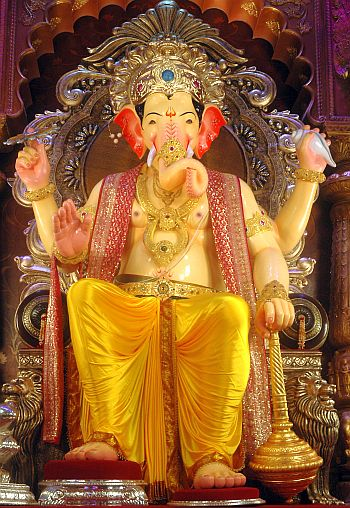
- Lalbaugcha Raja, 2009

Religion
- Affiliation: Hinduism
- Deity: Ganesha
- Festivals: Ganeshotsav, Ganesh Aagman
- Ecclesiastical or organisational status: Active

Location
- State: Maharashtra
- Country: India
- Interactive map of Lalbaugcha Raja

Website
- https://lalbaugcharaja.com/en/

Lalbaugcha Raja (English: The King of Lalbaug) is the sarvajanik (public) Ganesha idol kept at Lalbaug, a locality in Mumbai in the Indian state of Maharashtra, during the Ganesh Chaturthi festival. The idol gives darshan to the devotees for 11 days and thereafter it is immersed in the Arabian Sea at Girgaon Chowpatty on the day of Anant Chaturdashi (Ganapati Visarjan).

The belief that this idol of Ganesha is Navasacha Ganapati (Marathi: नवसाचा गणपती) (which means the "one who fulfils all wishes") draws over 1.5 million pilgrims to the idol's display area daily during the 10-day Ganesha Chaturthi festival.

As of 2026, the Lalbaugcha Raja has entered 93 years.

== History ==
LRVA Lalbaugcha Raja is the popular Ganesha idol of the Lalbaugcha Raja Sarvajanik Ganeshotsav Mandal. The mandal, formerly known as 'Sarvajanik Ganeshotsav Mandal, Lalbaug,' was founded in 1934 at Lalbaug Market by the fishermen of the Koli community.

The 'mandal' was founded because of a vow (Navas) for the construction of the present Lalbaug Market at its existing place. The market at Peru Chawl was shut down in 1932. Hence, the fishermen and vendors, who used to sell in the open place vowed to Ganesha to create a permanent place for their market. Aided by Kuwarji Jethabhai Shah, Shyamrao Vishnu Bodhe, V. B. Korgaonkar, Ramchandra Tawate, Nakhawa Kokam Mama, Bhausaheb Shinde, U. A. Rao, and the local residents, landlord Rajabai Tayyabali agreed to dedicate a plot for the market. The fishermen and traders established the Ganesha idol on 12 September 1934, in gratitude. The idol was dressed in the traditional attire of fishermen. This idol is believed to fulfil the wishes of devotees. The mandal was formed in the era when the freedom struggle was at its peak.

Since 1934, the idol was sculpted in different forms and its themes changed over the years, referencing scenes from Hindu mythology, Indian history and current affairs. Only in 2000, the iconic face of Lalbaugcha Raja was finalised. This face is continued to this day.

In 2020, due to the COVID-19 pandemic, the Lalbaugcha Raja Sarvajanik Ganeshotsav Mandal cancelled its traditional festivities for the first time in its in 86 years of its existence, instead focusing on a campaign to raise awareness about the virus.

== Caretakers ==
The Lalbaugcha Raja Ganapati idol has been sculpted by the Kambli family for over eight decades.

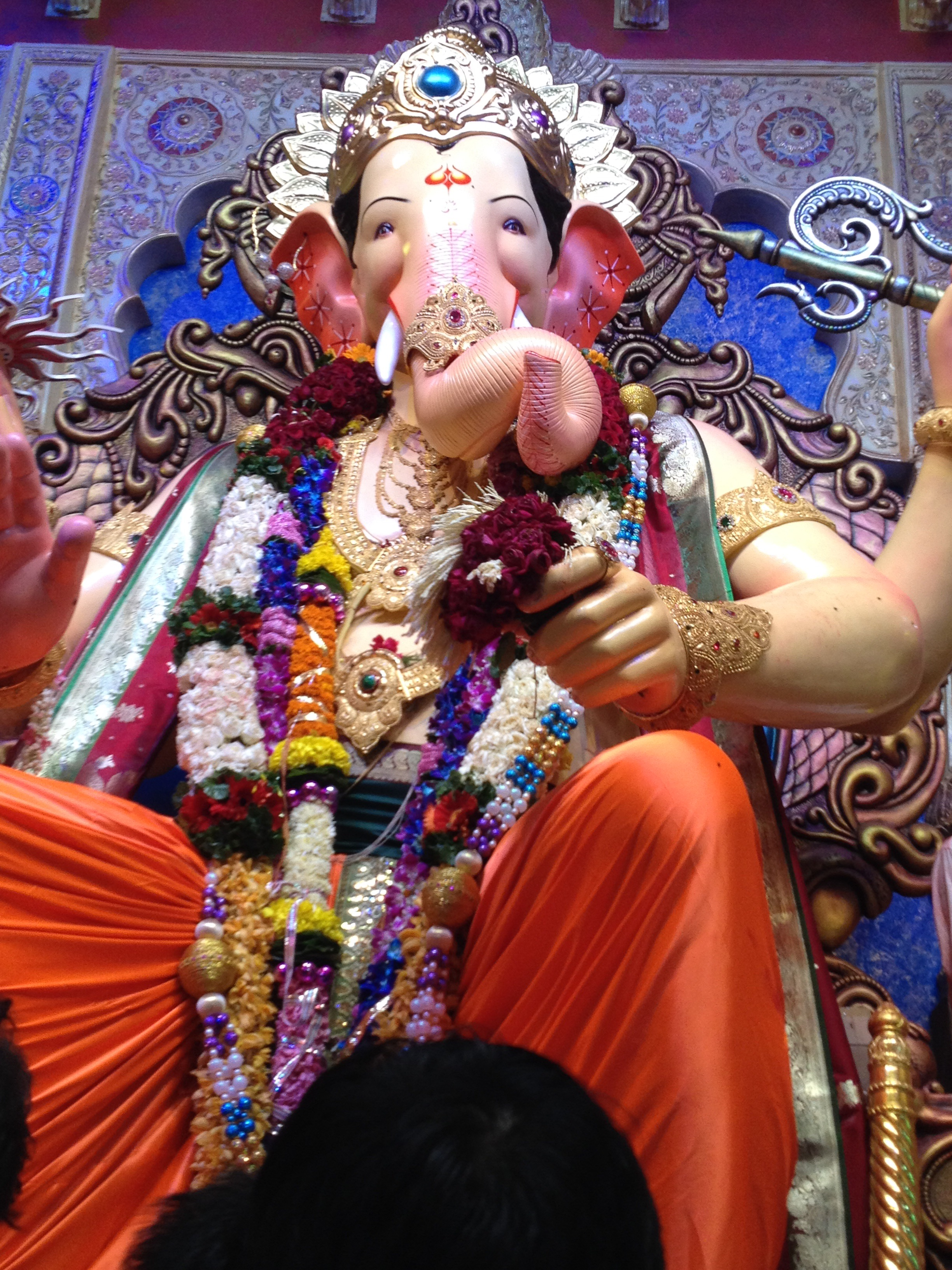
Lalbaugcha Raja

Ratnakar Kambli (the head of the Kambli family) was a sculptor of idols and had roaming exhibitions at festivals across Maharashtra. He began protecting the idol in 1935, when some of his friends recommended his name to the organisers. After his demise in 1952, his eldest son Venkatesh took over and, after his death, Ratnakar Kambli Jr., assumed the responsibility in 2002. Currently, Ratnakar and his sons make and protect the idol at Kambli Arts Workshop. The family also makes smaller versions of Lalbaugcha Raja which are used privately for the festival, often purchased by Bollywood celebrities.

Kambli Arts makes the parts of the Lalbaugcha Raja idol at its workshop; these are shipped to the main pandal where they are assembled and painted. Finally, Ratnakar, who is nearly 80 years old, goes to the pandal and draws the eyes. The height is around 5–6 meters (16–20 ft).

In recent years, the pandal and its decorations have been funded by the Ambani family.

== Arrangements for devotees ==
A few days before Ganesh Chaturthi, a Mukh Darshan (Holy sighting of the face) ceremony is organized by the Lalbaug Sarvajanik Ganeshotsav Mandal. This unveiling is covered by all national and regional channels.

The two queues for taking blessings of Lalbaugcha Raja are the Navsachi Line and the Mukh Darshanachi Line.

The Navsachi line is for people who want to get their wishes fulfilled. Pilgrims go on the stage, touch the feet of the idol, and receives the blessings of Ganesha. This line attracts huge numbers of people, politicians and celebrities. It takes around 25–30 hours and sometimes up to 40 hours (nearly 2 days) to get darshan in this line. 300–400 employees support the event ann.

The second line is meant for Mukh Darshan, to view the idol without going onto the stage. It can take 3–4 hours or longer to get darshan in this line, especially on weekends.

== Gallery ==
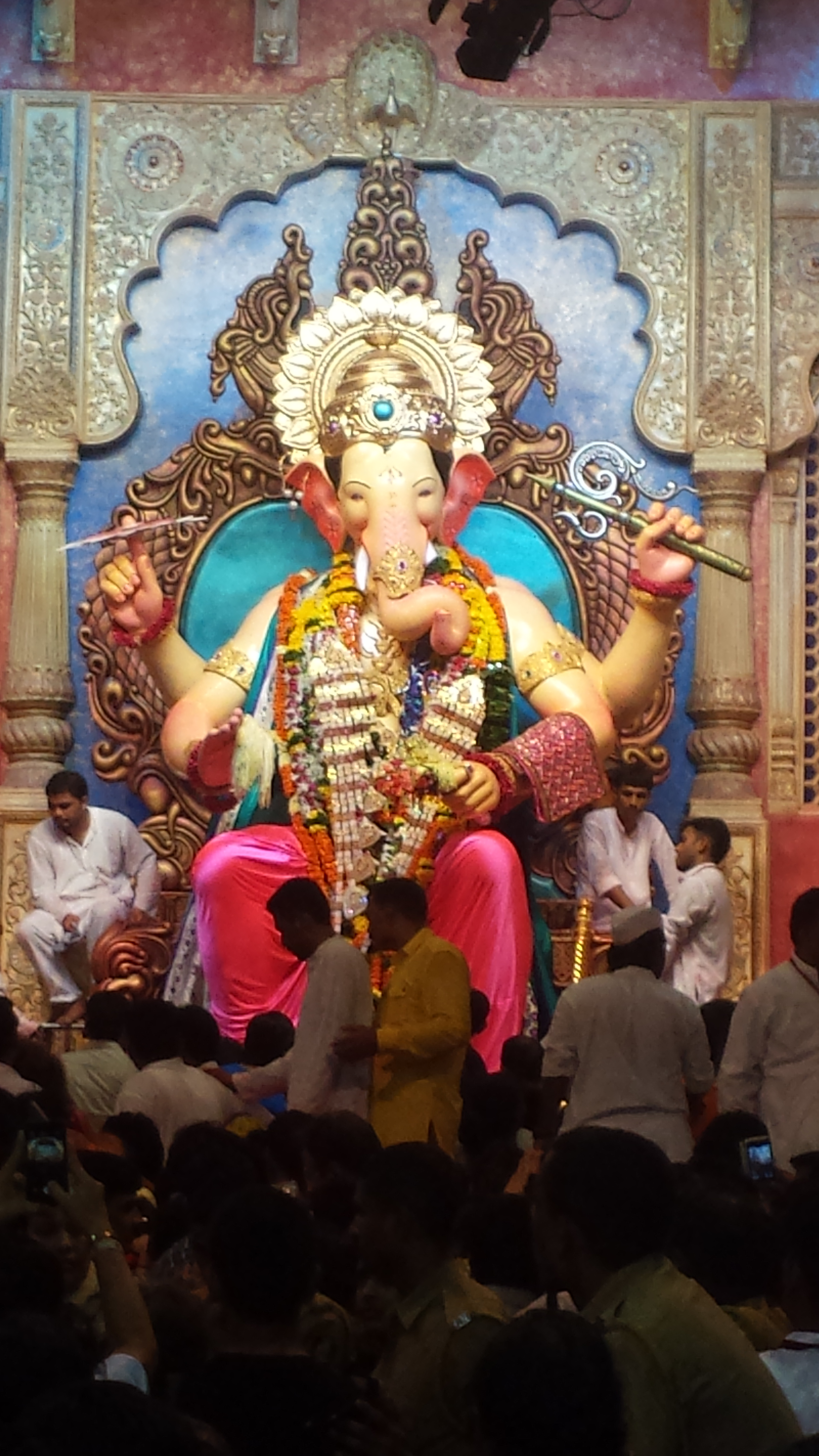
Lalbaugcha Raja 2014

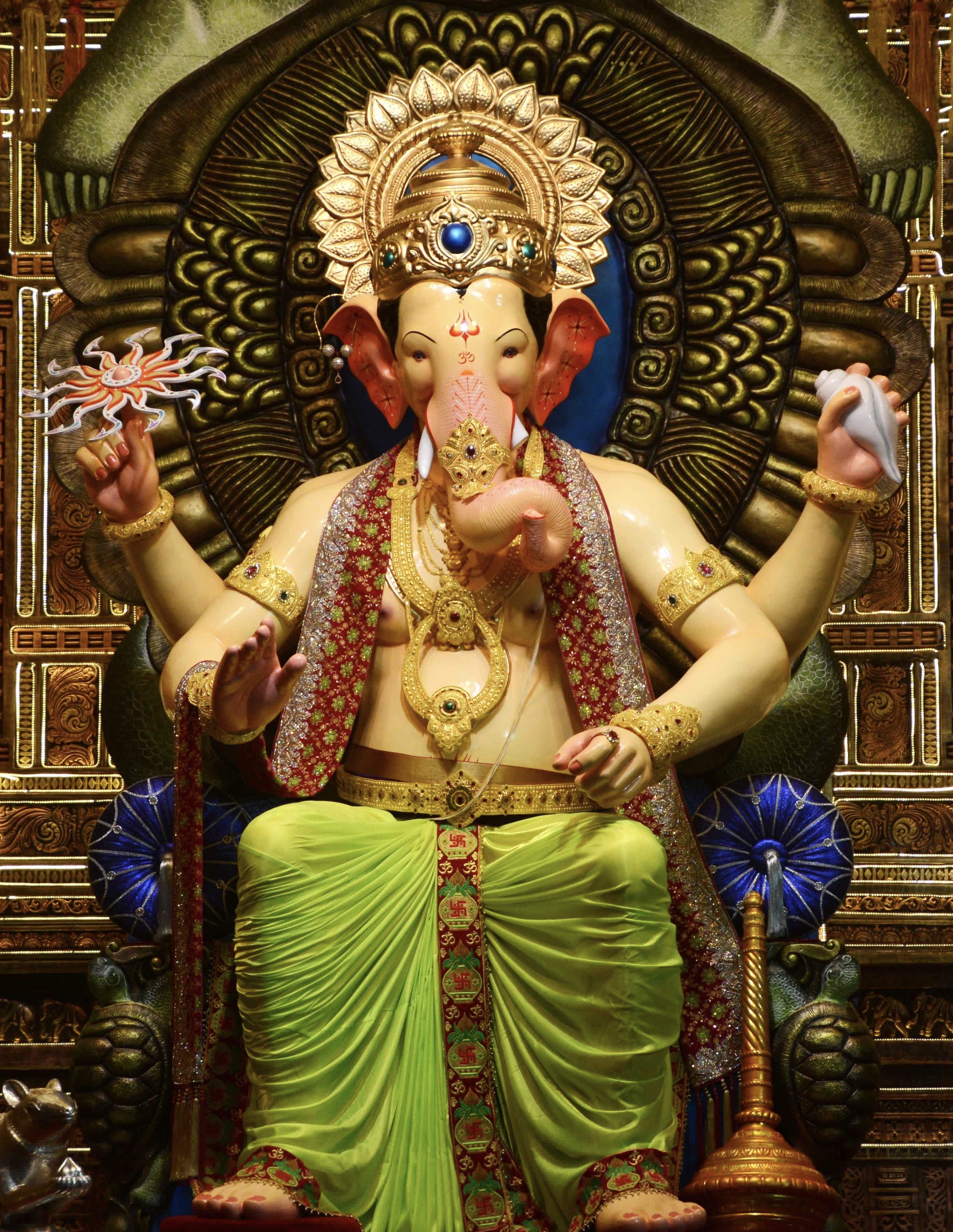
Lalbaugcha Raja 2008

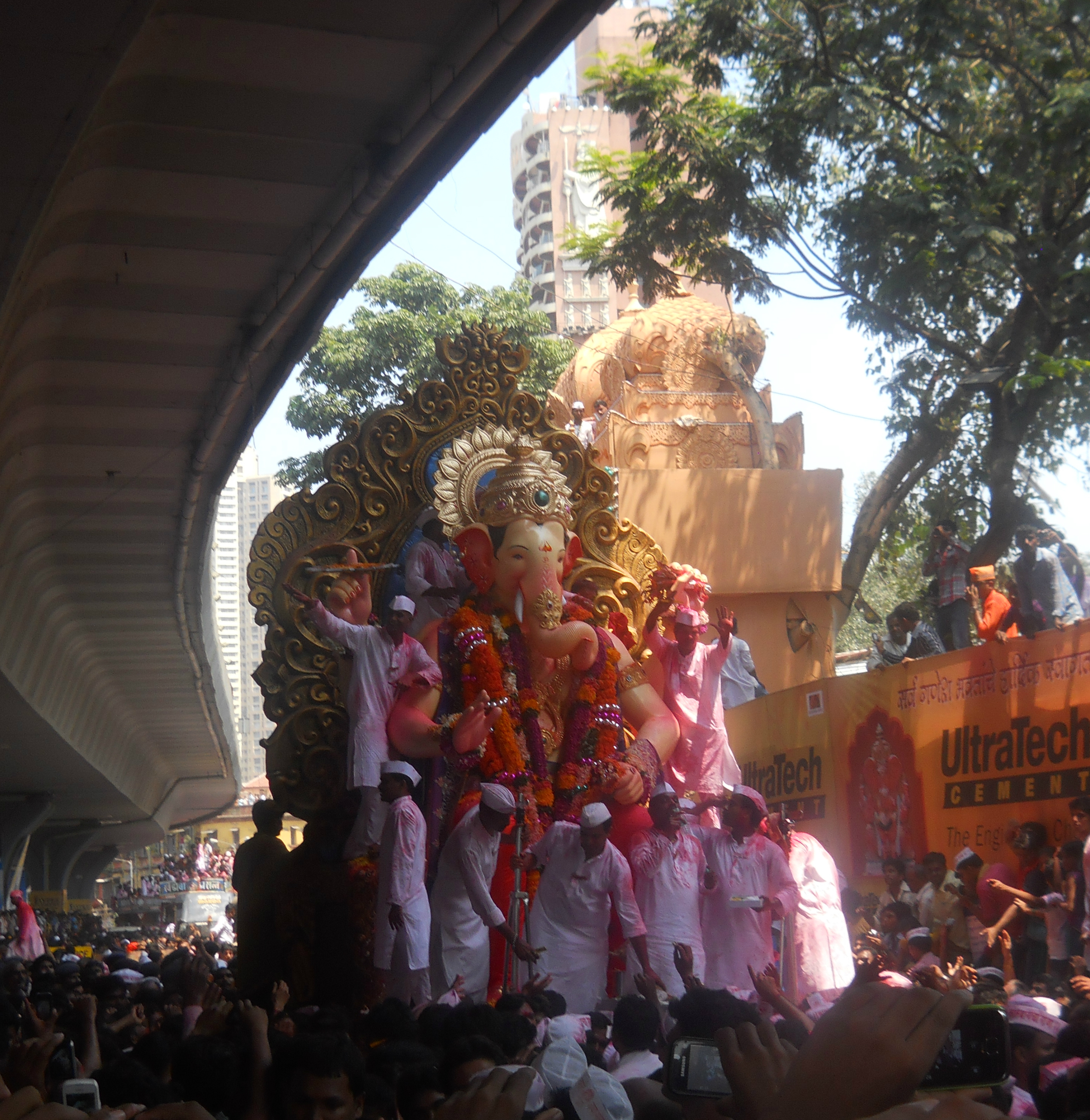
Lalbaugcha Raja Procession getting underway just outside its pandal on route to Girgaon Chowpatty for Visarjana (immersion)

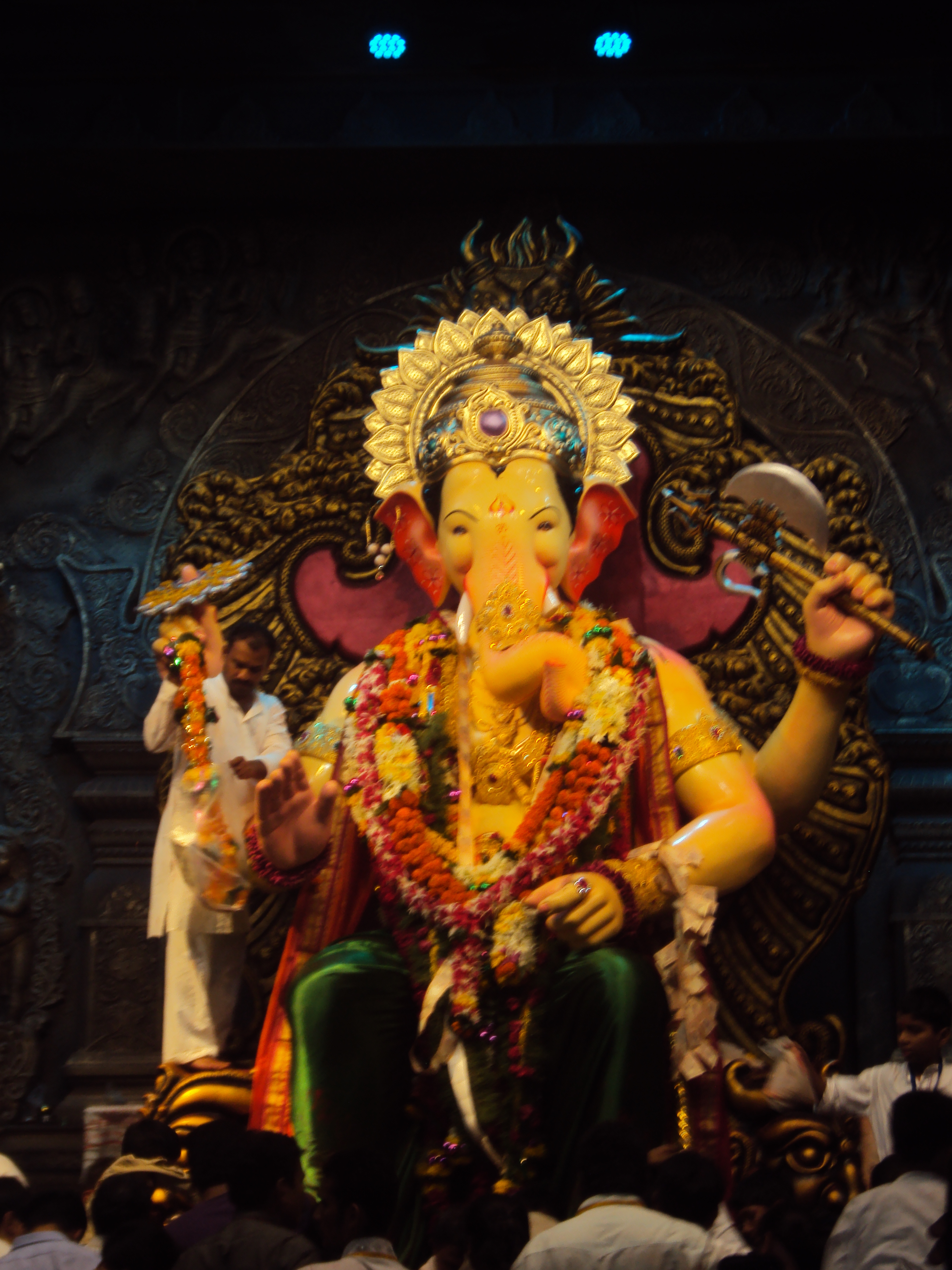
Lalbaugcha Raja 2011

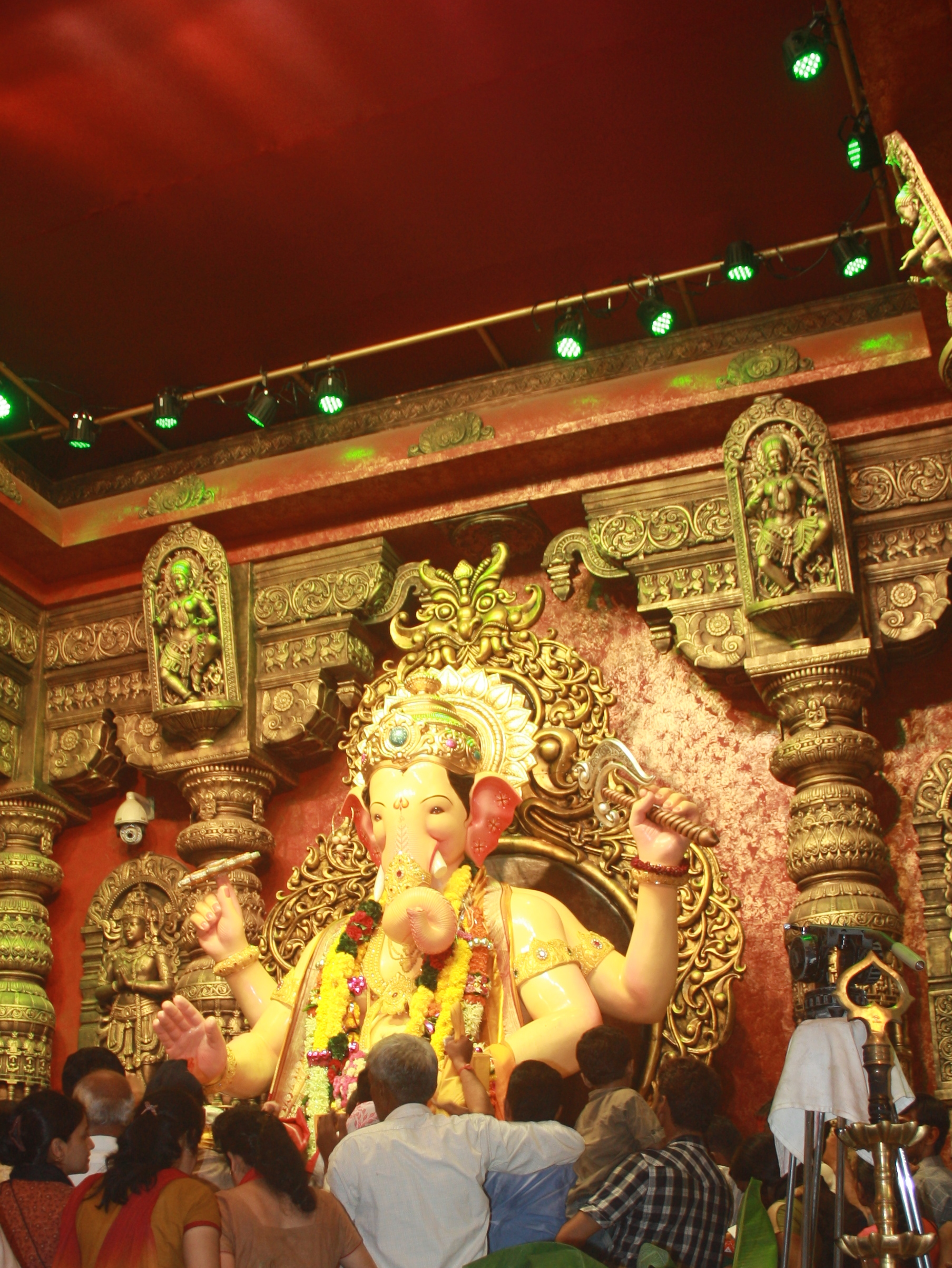
Lalbaugcha Raja 2010

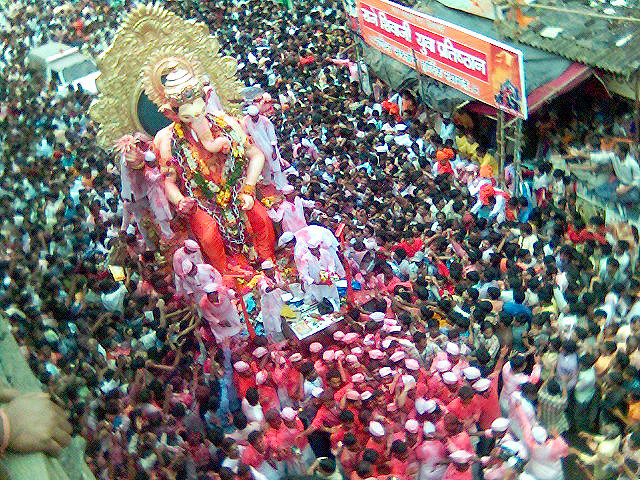
Lalbaugcha Raja Visarjan (immersion) Miravanuk (procession)
