= Ganesh Chaturthi =

Hindu religious festival

- Lalbaugcha Raja replica
- Official name: Vinayaka Chaturthi; Gauri aagman
- Also called: Chavithi; Chouthi, Ganeshotsav; Gauri Ganesh
- Observed by: Hindus around the world
- Type: Religious
- Significance: Commemorates the birth of the elephant-headed deity Ganesha
- Celebrations: Chanting of Vedic hymns and Hindu texts, prayers, processions, idol immersion
- Ends: 3 and 5, 7, 9, 11 days after the start and 21 days after the start only in some regions of India
- Date: Varies depending on lunar cycle as per Hindu calendar or Panchang
- 2025 date: 2025-08-27
- 2026 date: 2026-09-14
- 2027 date: 2027-09-4
- Frequency: Annual

Explanatory note on Hindu festival dates
- The Hindu calendar is lunisolar but most festival dates are specified using the lunar portion of the calendar. A lunar day is uniquely identified by three calendar elements: māsa (lunar month), pakṣa (lunar fortnight) and tithi (lunar day). Furthermore, when specifying the masa, one of two traditions are applicable, viz. amānta / pūrṇimānta. If a festival falls in the waning phase of the moon, these two traditions identify the same lunar day as falling in two different (but successive) masa. A lunar year is shorter than a solar year by about eleven days. As a result, most Hindu festivals occur on different days in successive years on the Gregorian calendar.

Ganesh Chaturthi (ISO: Gaṇeśa Caturthī) (transl. Festival of Ganesha on the Fourth Day), also known as Vinayaka Chavithi (Vināyaka Cavithī), or Vinayagar Chaturthi (Vināyagar Caturthī), is a Hindu festival celebrating the arrival of the Hindu deity Ganesha to the south of India to meet his brother Karthikeya. The festival is marked with the installation of Ganesha's murtis (devotional representations of a deity), privately in homes and publicly on elaborate pandals (temporary stages). Observances include chanting of Vedic hymns and Hindu texts, such as prayers and vrata (fasting). Offerings and prasada from the daily prayers, which are distributed from the pandal to the community, include sweets such as modak, as it is believed to be a favourite of Ganesha. The festival ends on the tenth day after its start, when the murti is carried in a public procession with music and group chanting, and then immersed in a nearby body of water such as a river or sea, called visarjana on the day of Ananta Chaturdashi. In Mumbai alone, around 150,000 murtis are immersed annually. It is a state festival of Indian state Maharashtra.

The festival celebrates Ganesha as the god of new beginnings, the remover of obstacles, and the god of wisdom, fortune, prosperity and intelligence. It is observed throughout the Indian subcontinent by Hindus, especially in the states such as Maharashtra, Madhya Pradesh, Gujarat, Uttar Pradesh, Karnataka, Odisha, Telangana, Andhra Pradesh, Tamil Nadu, Kerala, and Goa, as well as Sri Lanka. Ganesh Chaturthi is also observed by the Hindu diaspora elsewhere such as in Australia, New Zealand, Canada, Singapore, Malaysia, Sri Lanka, Trinidad and Tobago, Guyana, Suriname, other parts of the Caribbean, Fiji, Mauritius, South Africa, the United States, and Europe. In the Gregorian calendar, Ganesh Chaturthi falls between 22 August and 20 September every year. Reading of texts, feasting, athletic and martial arts competitions are held at public venues.

Although the exact origin of Ganesh Chaturthi is unknown, public celebrations were popularized by Chatrapati Shivaji Maharaj in the 1600s, who used the celebration as a means to promote harmony and unity across castes. Celebrations were re-popularized by Bal Gangadhar Tilak in the 1880s as a means to rebel against the British, who had banned public assemblies in India. The celebration served as an opportunity to unify Indians across castes and protest against British rule in India.

== History ==
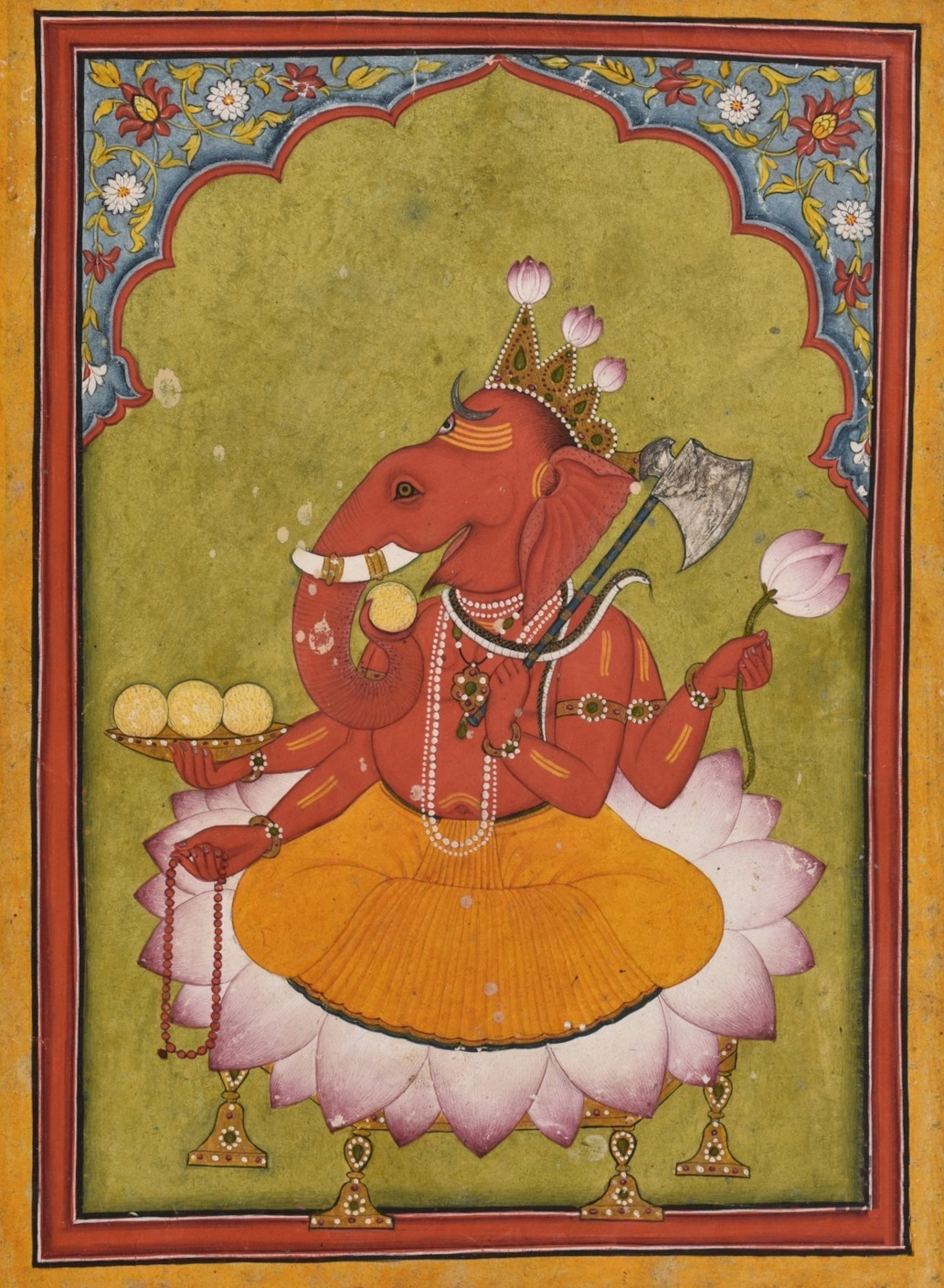
Ganesha, Basohli miniature, circa 1730.

=== Festival ===
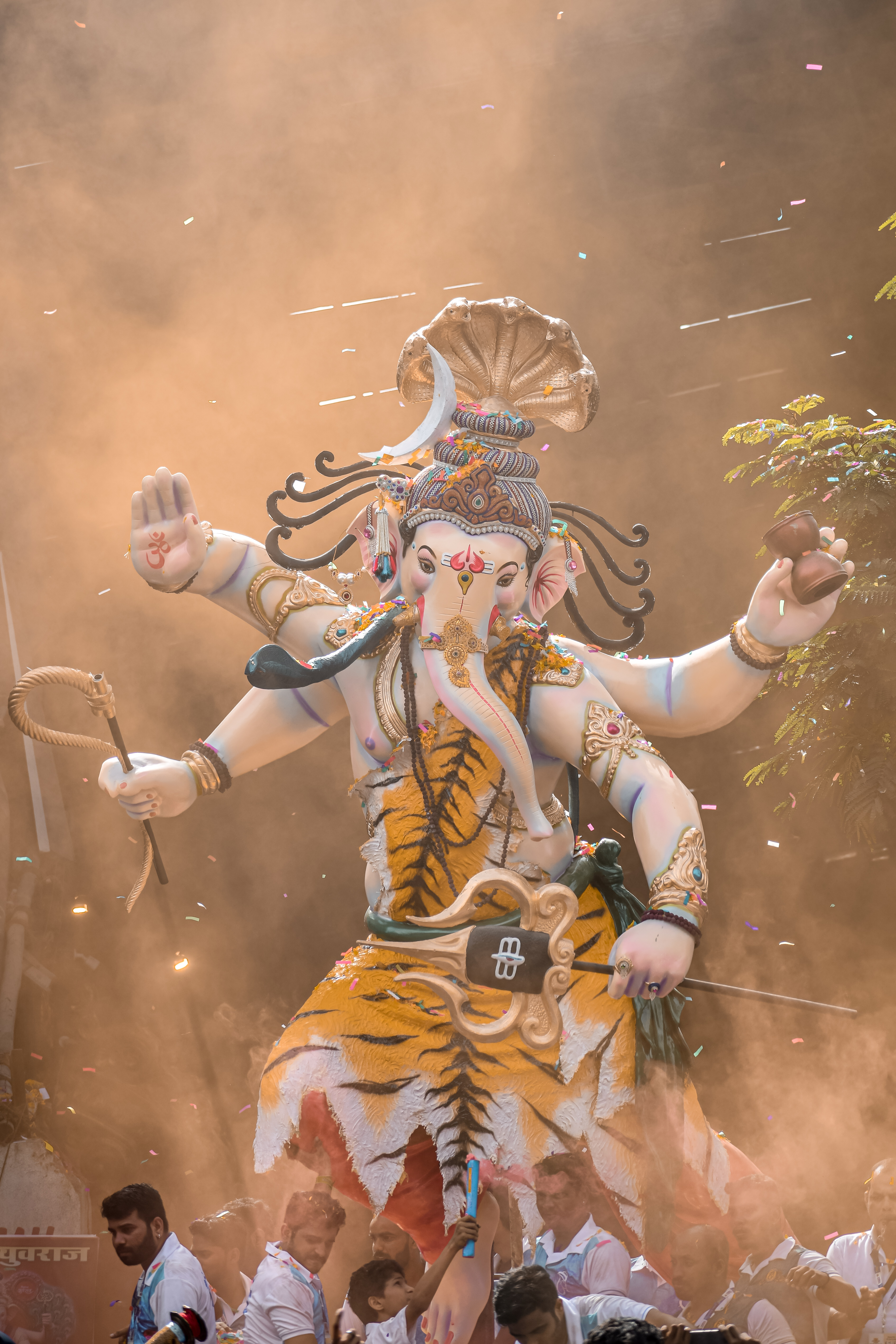
Ganesh Agman

Although it is unknown when (or how) Ganesh Chaturthi was first observed, the festival has been publicly celebrated in Pune since the era of King Shivaji (1630–1680, founder of the Maratha Empire). The Peshwa in the 18th century were devotees of Ganesha and started as a public Ganesh festival in their capital city of Pune during the month of Bhadrapad. After the start of the British Raj, the Ganesh festival lost state patronage and became a private family celebration in Maharashtra until its revival by Indian freedom fighter and social reformer Bal Gangadhar Tilak. Bal Gangadhar Tilak, popularly known as Lokmanya Tilak, championed it as a means to circumvent the colonial British government ban on Hindu gatherings through its anti-public assembly legislation in 1892. Lokmanya Tilak started the festival in Pune and Girgaon, Mumbai.

I followed with the greatest curiosity crowds who carried in procession an infinite number of idols of the God Ganesh. Each little quarter of the town, each family with its adherents, each little street corner I may almost say, organises a procession of its own, and the poorest may be seen carrying on a simple plank their little idol or of paper mâché... A crowd, more or less numerous, accompanies the idol, clapping hands and raises cries of joy, while a little orchestra generally precedes the idol.
– Angelo de Gubernatis, Bombay Gazette (1886)

According to others such as Kaur, the festival became a public event later, in 1892 when Krishnajipant Khasgiwale (also known as Nanasaheb Khasgiwale), a Pune resident, visited Gwalior then under Scindia rule where he witnessed a public Ganesh Chaturthi celebration (Sarvajanik Ganesh Mahotsav) for the first time. This inspired him to conceptualize a similar public festival back home in Pune. Khasgiwale shared this idea with his friends in Pune Shrimant Bhausaheb Rangari (a respected royal physician and freedom fighter) and Balasaheb Natu. Enthused by the idea, Rangari took the lead and installed the first sarvajanik (public) Ganesha idol in his wada in the Shalukar Bol area of Pune. In 1893, Lokmanya Tilak praised the celebration of Sarvajanik Ganesh Utsav in his newspaper, Kesari, and dedicated his efforts to launch the annual domestic festival into a large, well organised public event. Tilak recognised Ganesh's appeal as "the god for everybody", and according to Robert Brown, he chose Ganesha as the god that bridged "the gap between Brahmins and non-Brahmins", thereby building a grassroots unity across them to oppose British colonial rule.

Other scholars state that the British Empire, after 1870 out of fear of seditious assemblies, had passed a series of ordinances that banned public assembly for social and political purposes of more than 20 people in British India, but exempted religious assembly for Friday mosque prayers under pressure from the Indian Muslim community. Tilak believed that this effectively blocked the public assembly of Hindus whose religion did not mandate daily prayers or weekly gatherings, and he leveraged this religious exemption to make Ganesh Chaturthi to circumvent the British colonial law on large public assembly. He was the first to install large public images of Ganesha in pavilions in Bombay Presidency, and other celebratory events at the festival.

God Ganesh: political obstacle remover

Why shouldn't we convert the large religious festivals
into mass political rallies?

— Lokmanya Tilak, Kesari, 8 September 1896

(Note: The transformation of Ganesh Chaturthi into a major annual religious and politically significant procession event started in 1894. According to Aslam Syed, the Ganesh Murti immersion ritual in the western states of India may have grown because the annual gathering and procession by Shia Muslims on Muharram was allowed by the colonial British government in the 19th and early 20th century, and after the ritual mourning of the death of the 7th century Imam, they would immerse Tazia (Taboots) into river or ocean. The Hindus expanded their own Ganesh processions by walking through the streets, joyfully dancing and reciting their scriptural verses and ended their procession with a ceremonial immersion of Ganesh. The colonial British government attempted to introduce procession licence, to Muslims only, which Hindu leaders presented as evidence of discriminatory oppression by the Muslims and the British. The Hindu leaders such as Tilak defied any attempts to selectively stop the Hindu congregational gathering and processions associated with Ganesh Chaturthi. The right to organise processions and immersion rituals of Tazia by Muslims, and Ganesh by Hindus, have remained a religious and equal rights issue ever since, particularly when the religious calendars overlap.)

According to Richard Cashman, Tilak passionately committed himself to Ganesha after the 1893 Hindu-Muslim communal violence in Bombay and the Deccan riots, when he felt that the British India government under Lord Harris had repeatedly taken sides and not treated Hindus fairly because Hindus were not well organised. In Tilak's estimate, Ganesha worship and processions were already popular in rural and urban Hindu populations, across social castes and classes in Baroda, Gwalior, Pune and most of the Maratha region in the 18th century. In 1893, Tilak helped expand Ganesh Chaturthi festival into a mass community event and a hidden means for political activism, intellectual discourse, poetry recitals, plays, concerts, and folk dances.

In Goa, Ganesh Chaturthi predates the Kadamba era. The Goa Inquisition had banned Hindu festivals, and Hindus who did not convert to Christianity were severely restricted. However, Hindu Goans continued to practice their religion despite the restrictions. Many families worship Ganesha in the form of patri (leaves used for worshiping Ganesha or other gods), a picture is drawn on paper or small silver idols. In some households Ganesha idols are hidden, a feature unique to Ganesh Chaturthi in Goa due to a ban on clay Ganesha idols and festivals by the Jesuits as part of the Inquisition.

== Celebration in India ==
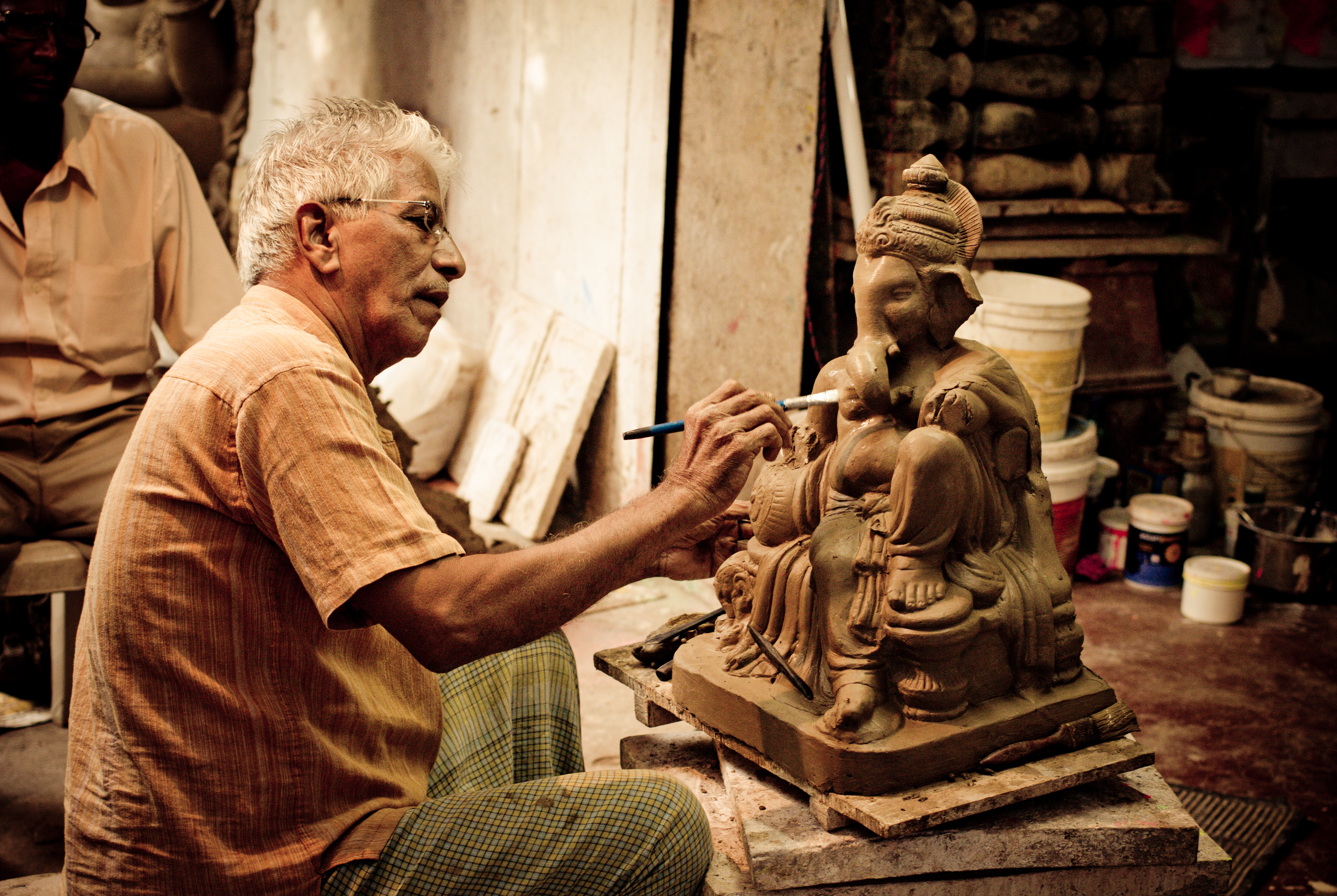
Artist preparing Ganesha's image for the festival in Margao, Goa

In India, Ganesh Chaturthi is primarily celebrated at home and in public by local community groups in the central and western states of Maharashtra, Madhya Pradesh, Gujarat, (Note: "Gaṇeśacatūrthī has only recently gained some significance and is celebrated mostly in the big cities") Uttar Pradesh, Rajasthan and Goa and the southern states of Karnataka, Andhra Pradesh, Telangana, Tamil Nadu, and Kerala and eastern states of West Bengal and Odisha and in North eastern state of Assam.

On the same day, Chaurchan festival is celebrated in Mithila region of Bihar which is related to Ganesha and Chandra, the Hindu moon god.

The date for the festival is usually decided by the presence of Chaturthi Thithi. The festival is held during "Bhadrapada Madyahanaa Purvabaddha". If the Chaturthi Thiti begins at night on the previous day and gets over by morning on next day, then the next day is observed as Vinayaka Chaturthi.

In the consecration ceremony, a priest performs a Prana Pratishtha to invite Ganesh like a guest. This is followed by the 16-step Shodashopachara ritual, (Sanskrit: Shodash, 16; Upachara, process) during which coconut, jaggery, modaks, durva grass and red hibiscus (Jaswand) flowers are offered to the idol. Depending on the region and time zone, the ceremony commences with hymns from the Rigveda, the Ganapati Atharvashirsa, the Upanishads and the Ganesh stotra (prayer) from the Narada Purana are chanted. In Maharashtra as well as Goa, aarti is performed with friends and family, typically in the morning and evening.

In preparation for the festival, artisans create clay models of Ganesha for sale. The images (Murtis) range in size from 20 mm (3/4 in) for homes to over 20 m (70 ft) for large community celebrations.

On the last day of the festival, the tradition of Ganesh visarjan or nimajjanam (lit. "immersion") takes places, when the Ganesha images are immersed in a river, sea or water body. On the last day, the devotees come out in processions carrying the idols of Ganesha, culminating in immersion. It is believed that the god who comes to the earthly realm on Ganesh Chaturthi, returns to his celestial abode after immersion. The celebration of Ganesh Chaturthi also denotes the significance of the cycle of birth, life and death. It is believed that when the idol of the Ganesha is taken out for immersion, it also takes away with it the various obstacles of the house and these obstacles are destroyed along with the immersion. Every year, people wait with great anticipation to celebrate the festival of Ganesh Chaturthi.

=== Domestic celebration ===
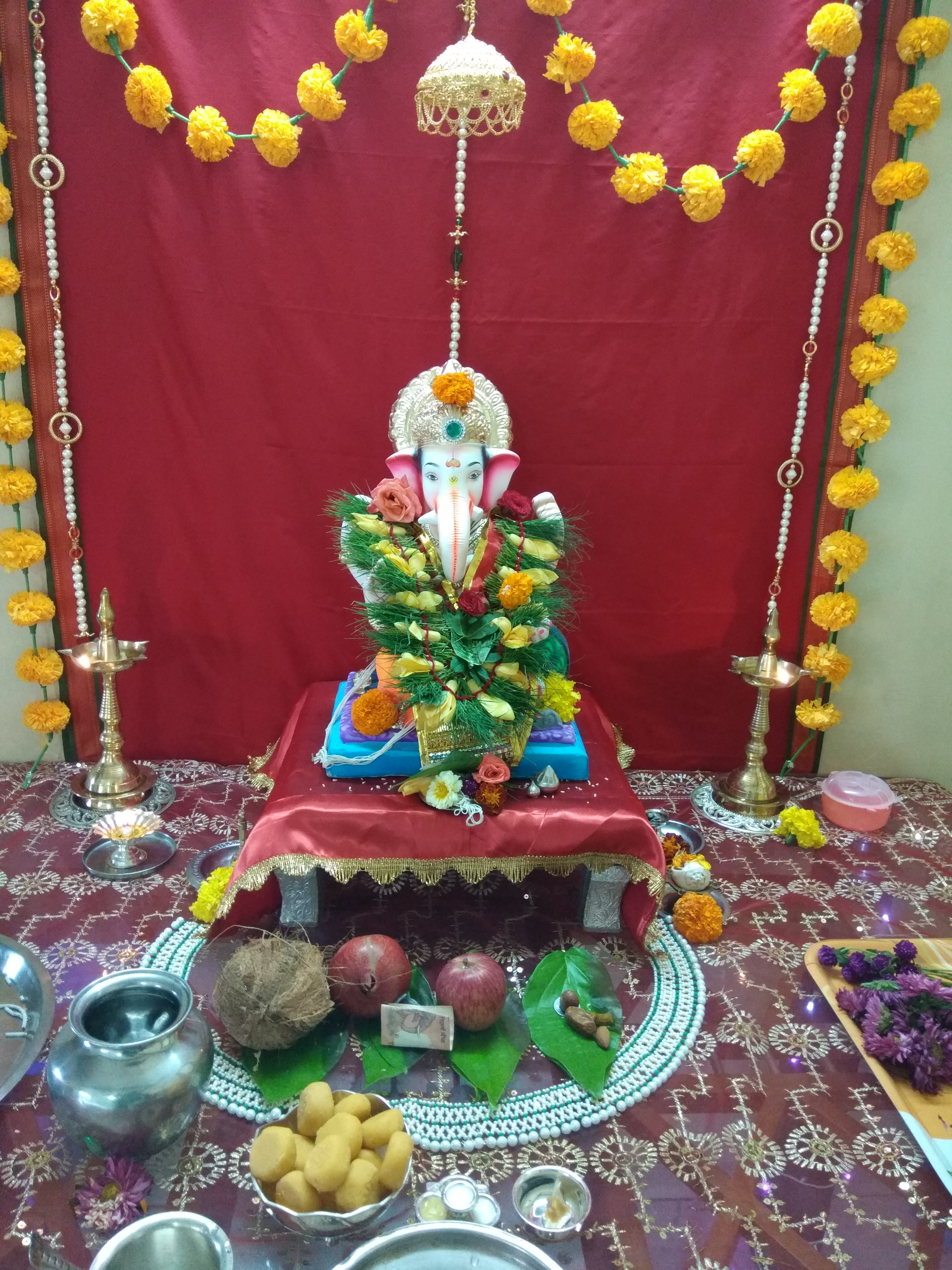
A domestic celebration of Ganesh during Ganesh Chaturthi in a Maharashtrian home

In Maharashtra, Ganesh Chaturthi is known as Ganeshotsav. Families install small clay Murtis for worship during the festival. At home, the festival preparation includes purchases such as puja items or accessories a few days in advance and booking the Ganesh murti as early as a month beforehand (from local artisans). The murti is brought home either a day before or on the day of the Ganesh Chaturthi itself. Families decorate a small, clean portion of the house with flowers and other colourful items before installing the idol. When the Murti is installed, it and its shrine are decorated with flowers and other materials. On the day of the festival, The ceremonial installation of the clay murti (idol) is done along with chants of holy Ganesh mantras, and puja including bhajans during a certain auspicious period of the day. The Murti is worshipped in the morning and evening with offerings of flowers, durva (strands of young grass), karanji and modaks (jaggery and coconut flakes wrapped in rice flour dumplings). The worship ends with the singing of an aarti in honour of Ganesh, other Gods and Saints.

In Maharashtra the Marathi aarti "Sukhakarta Dukhaharta", composed by the 17th-century saint, Samarth Ramdas is sung. Family traditions differ about when to end the celebration. Domestic celebrations end after 1 1/2, 3, 5, 7 or 11 days. At that time the Murti is ceremoniously brought to a body of water (such as a lake, river or the sea) for immersion. In Maharashtra, Ganeshotsav also incorporates other festivals, namely Hartalika and the Gauri festival, the former is observed with a fast by women on the day before Ganesh Chaturthi whilst the latter by the installation of Murtis of Gauris. In some communities such as the Chitpavan, and the CKP, pebbles collected from river bank are installed as representations of Gauri.

In Goa, Ganesh Chaturthi is known as Chavath in Konkani and Parab or Parva ("auspicious celebration"); it begins on the third day of the lunar month of Bhadrapada. On this day Parvati and Shiva are worshipped by women, who fast. Instruments such as ghumots, crash cymbals (ताळ(taal) in Konkani) and pakhavaj (an Indian barrel-shaped, two-headed drum) are played during the rituals. The harvest festival, Navyachi Pancham, is celebrated the next day; freshly harvested paddy is brought home from the fields (or temples) and a puja is conducted. Communities who ordinarily eat seafood refrain from doing so during the festival.

In Karnataka the Gowri festival precedes Ganesh Chaturthi, and people across the state wish each other well. A notable variation is the Chabbi Ganapathi or Chabbi Ganeshotsava in Dharwad District, where households of Kulkarni family worship a red-coloured Ganesha, a tradition dating to 1827.

In Andhra Pradesh, Ganesh Murtis of clay (Matti Vinayakudu) and turmeric (Siddhi Vinayakudu) are usually worshipped at home with plaster of Paris Murti's.

=== Public celebration ===
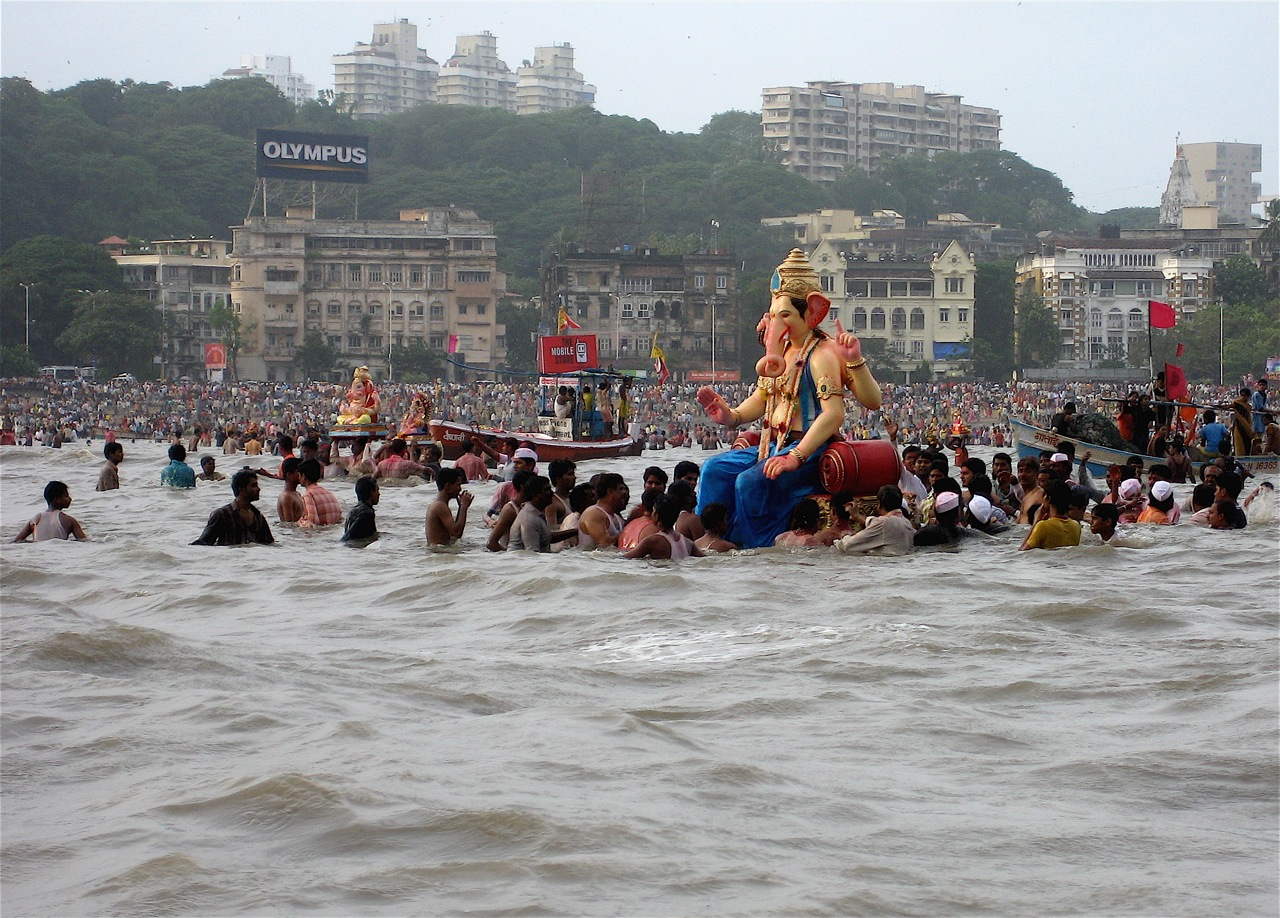
Ganesh Visarjan in Mumbai

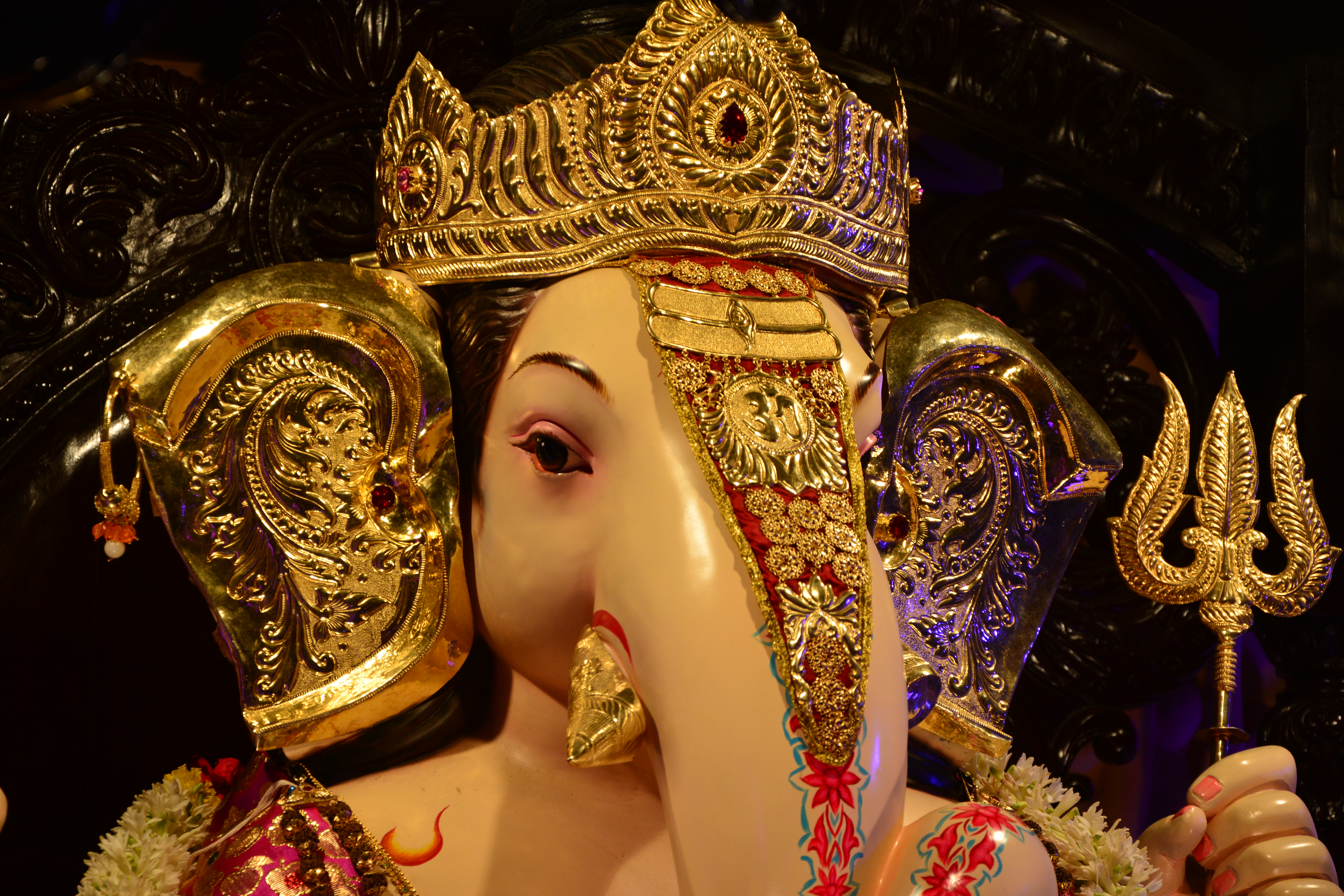
Ganpati idol in Pune

Public celebrations of the festival are popular and are organised by local youth groups, neighbourhood associations, or groups of tradespeople. Funds for the public festival are collected from members of the association arranging the celebration, local residents and businesses. The Ganesh idols and accompanying Murti are installed in temporary shelters, known as mandaps or pandals. Public preparations begin months in advance. The making of the Murti in Maharashtra usually begins with "Padya pooja" or worshipping the feet of Ganesh. The Murtis are brought to "pandals" on the day or a day before the festival begins. The pandals have elaborate decoration and lighting.

The festival features cultural activities such as singing, theatre and orchestral performances and community activities such as free medical checkups, blood-donation sites and donations to the poor. Ganesh Chaturthi, in addition to its religious aspects, is an important economic activity in Mumbai, Pune, Nagpur, Nashik, Kolhapur, Khamgaon, Aurangabad, Indore, Agra, Surat, Hyderabad, Visakhapatnam, Bangalore, Chennai, Thiruvananthapuram and Kurnool.

Ganesh Chaturthi festival large-scale production of statues, Mumbai, India

Many artists, industries, and businesses earn a significant amount of their living from the festival, which is a stage for budding artists. Members of other religions also participate in the celebration.

In Tamil Nadu, the festival, also known as Vinayaka Chaturthi or Pillayar Chaturthi, falls on the fourth day after the new moon in the month of Āvaṇi in the Tamil calendar. The idols are usually made of clay or papier-mâché, since Plaster of Paris idols have been banned by the state government, but violations of this rule are often reported. Idols are also made of coconuts and other organic products. They are worshipped for several days in pandals and immersed in the Bay of Bengal the following Sunday. In Kerala the festival is also known as Lambodhara Piranalu, which falls in the month of Chingam. In Thiruvananthapuram a procession marches from the Pazhavangadi Ganapathi Temple to Shankumugham Beach, with tall Murti of Ganesha made from organic items and milk immersed in the sea.

=== Ganesh Chaturthi celebrations in Hyderabad ===
Hyderabad is known for its large public Ganesh Chaturthi celebrations, particularly the Khairatabad Ganesh. In 2026, the Khairatabad idol stood 69 feet tall and depicted Panchamukha Sankatahara Maha Ganapati, a five-faced form of Ganesha. It was constructed using natural clay, sand, straw and other materials.

During the same year, the Tiranga Youth Association installed a 72-foot Shri Ashta Siddhi Mahaganpati idol in Nagole, surpassing the Khairatabad idol in height. The Nagole idol was constructed by artisans from Telangana and West Bengal using clay, bamboo, grass and other natural materials. Both installations reflected efforts by festival organizers to reduce the environmental impact of celebrations by using alternatives to conventional plaster-of-Paris idols.

=== At prominent temples ===
At Varasidhi Vinayaka Swamy Temple in Kanipakam, Andhra Pradesh, annual brahmotsavams will be celebrated for 21 days starting from Vinayaka Chavithi day. The processional deity of Vinayaka (Ganesh) will be taken in a procession on different vahanams on these days amidst large number of pilgrims across the country.

In Mumbai, thousands of devotees from around the world visit the Siddhivinayak Temple to celebrate Ganesh Chaturthi.

== Celebration outside India ==
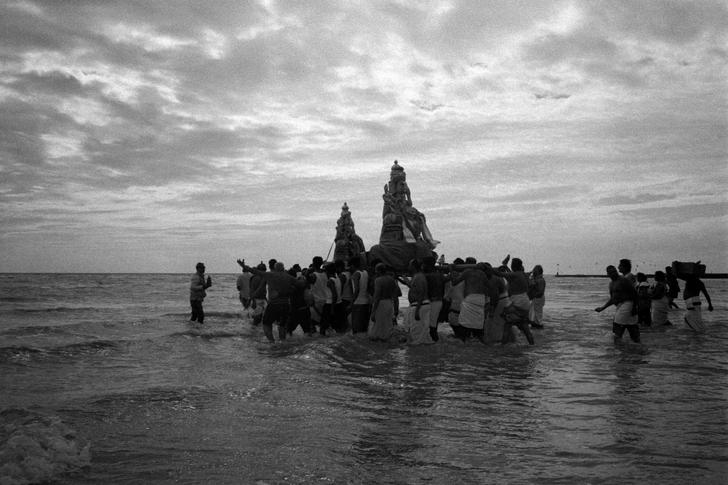
Ganesha Murthi are carried out into the North Sea at Clacton-on-Sea, UK.

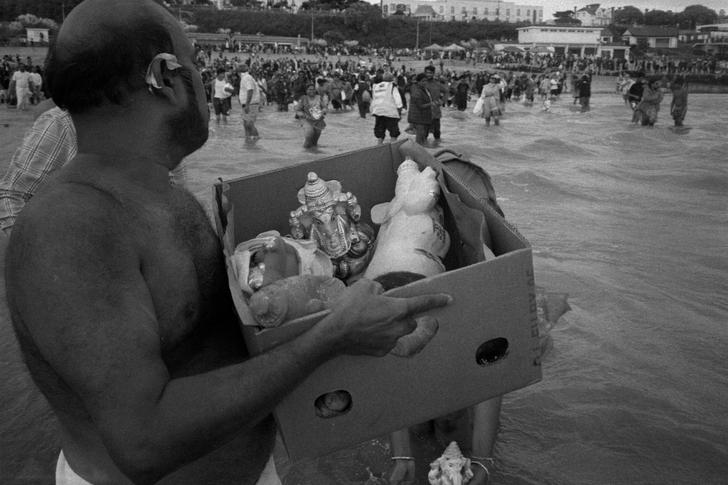
A devotee carries a box of Ganesha Murthi into the North Sea at Clacton-on-Sea, UK.

In Pakistan, Ganesh Chaturthi celebrations are conducted by the Shri Maharashtra Panchayat, an organisation for Maharashtrians in Karachi.

Ganesh Chaturthi is celebrated in the UK by the British Hindu population living there. The Hindu Culture and Heritage Society, a Southall-based organisation, celebrated Ganesh Chaturthi for the first time in London in 2005 at the Vishwa Hindu Temple; and the idol was immersed in the River Thames at Putney Pier. Another celebration, organised by a Gujarati group, has been celebrated in Southend-on-Sea, and attracted an estimated 18,000 devotees. Annual celebrations are also held on the River Mersey in Liverpool, in the North Sea at Clacton-on-Sea, and Caldecotte Lake in Milton Keynes.

The Philadelphia Ganesh Festival is one of the most popular celebrations of Ganesh Chaturthi in North America, and it is also celebrated in Canada (particularly in the Toronto area), Detroit Metropolitan area-Wayne State university, Mauritius, Malaysia and Singapore. The Mauritius festival dates back to 1896, and the Mauritian government has made it a public holiday. In Malaysia and Singapore, the festival is more commonly known as Vinayagar Chaturthi because of the large Tamil-speaking Hindu minority.

In Ghana, ethnic African Hindus celebrate Ganesh Chaturthi.

In Tenerife (Spain), is one of the few places in Europe where Ganesh Chaturthi is celebrated publicly.

In Fiji Islands, Thakur Lal Waghela started Ganesh Chaturthi in 1985. It became an annual celebration for the town of Lautoka, the Ganesh murti would be taken to town to visit shops before heading to Saweni beach for visarjan. Then later there would be a feast organised for the entire town. Now Fiji islands have more than 100 Ganesh visarjans happening during the festival. When Thakur lal Waghela migrated to Auckland New Zealand, he continued the yearly celebrations, 10 years in Auckland and a further 10 years in Palmerston North. After 40 years of public celebrations, he has now continued it as a private one.

== Foods ==
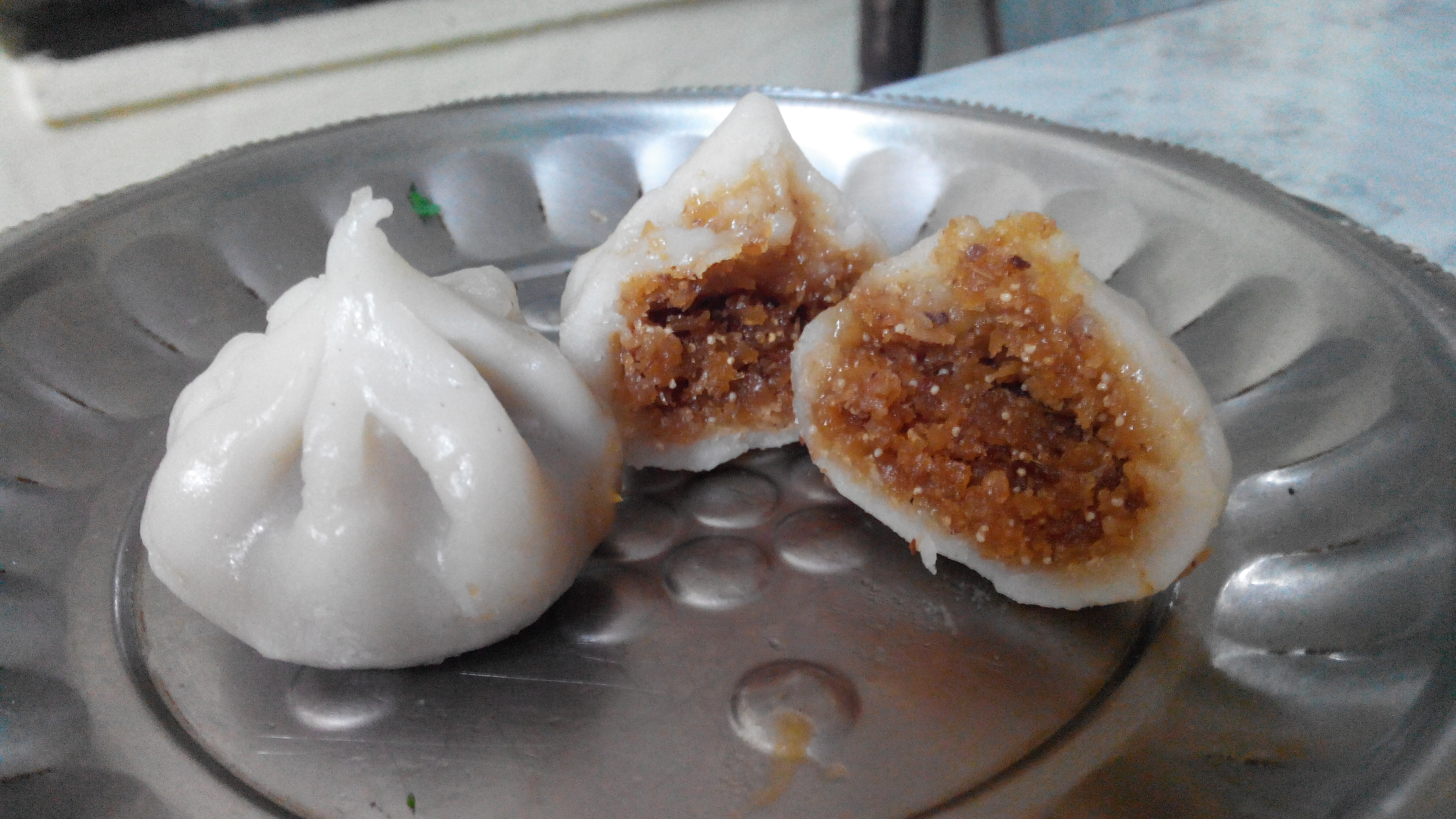
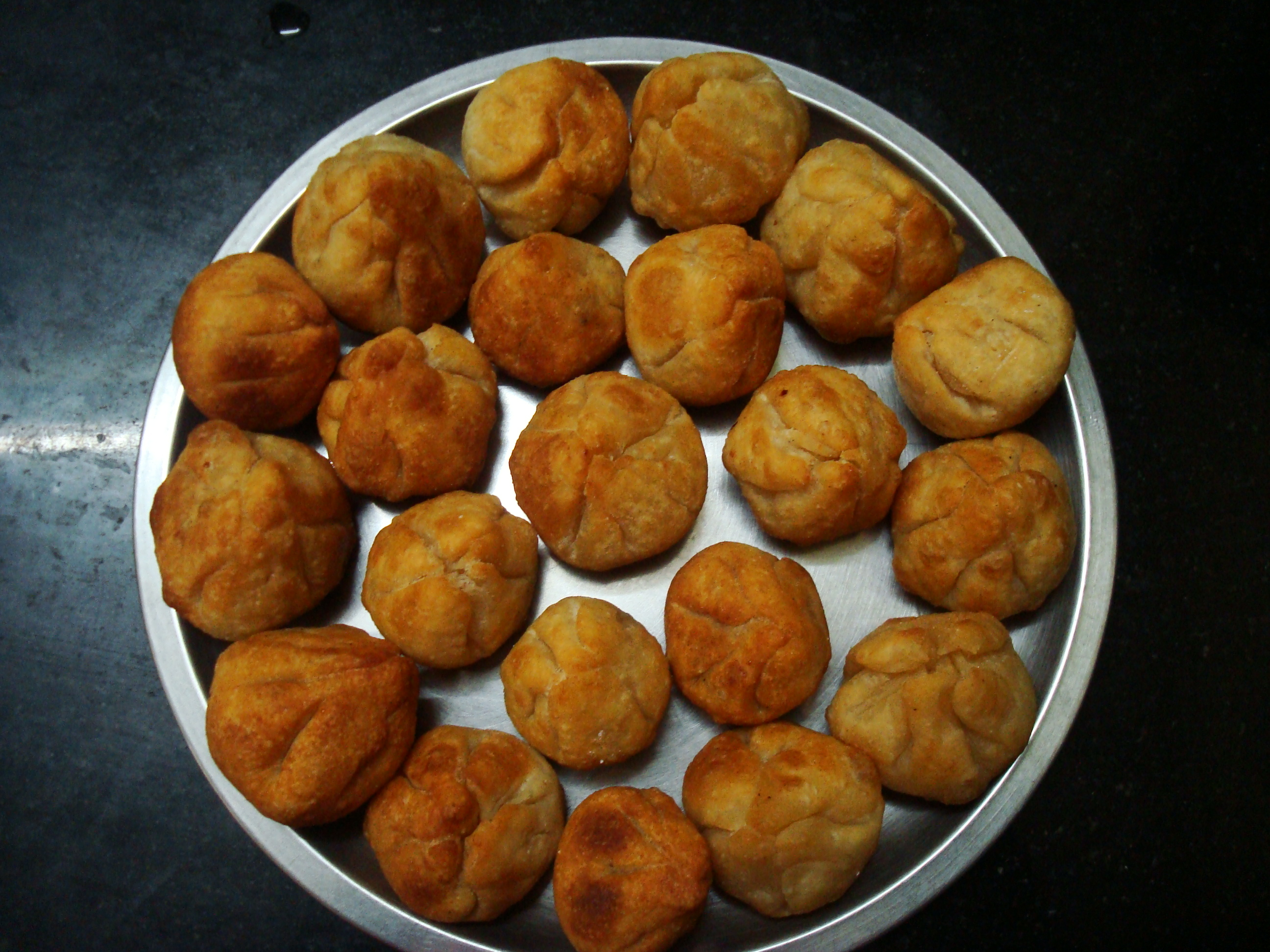
Modaka are sweet dumplings, the traditional offerings and prasada in Ganesh Chaturthi. Left: steamed with fillings, Right: Fried

The primary sweet dish during the festival is modak (modak in Marathi and Konkani, modakam or kudumu in Telugu, modaka or kadubu in Kannada, kozhakatta or modakkam in Malayalam and kozhukattai or modagam in Tamil). A modak is a dumpling made from rice or wheat flour, stuffed with grated coconut, jaggery, dried fruits and other condiments and steamed or fried. Another popular sweet dish is the karanji (karjikai in Kannada), similar to modak in composition and taste but in a semicircular shape. This sweet meal is called Nevri in Goa and is synonymous with Ganesh festival amongst the Goans and the Konkani diaspora.

In Andhra Pradesh and Telangana modak, laddu, vundrallu (steamed, coarsely ground rice-flour balls), panakam (a jaggery-, black pepper- and cardamom-flavoured drink), vadapappu (soaked moong lentils) and chalividi (a cooked rice flour and jaggery mixture) are offered to Ganesh. These offerings are known as naivedya, and a plate of modak traditionally holds 21 pieces of the sweet. In Goa, modak and a Goan version of idli (sanna) is popular.

Panchakajjaya is an offering made to Ganesh during this festival in parts of Karnataka. It is a mixture of desiccated coconut, roasted Bengal gram powder, sugar, ghee, and sesame. Different versions of panchakajjaya are made. Roasted Bengal gram, green gram, roasted chana dal (putani) or aval can be used.

== Environmental impact ==
The Madras High Court ruled in 2004 that immersion of Ganesh idols is unlawful because it incorporates chemicals that pollute the sea water. In Goa, the sale of plaster-of-Paris Ganesha idols has been banned by the state government and celebrants are encouraged to buy traditional, artisan-made clay idols.

Recent initiatives to produce traditional clay Ganesh idols in Hyderabad have been sponsored by the Andhra Pradesh Pollution Control Board. In Gujarat, Ganesh idols made with a mixture of cow dung and clay are sold and marketed as "Vedic Ganesh idols".

Due to environmental concerns, a number of families now avoid bodies of water and let the clay murtis disintegrate in a barrel of water at home. After a few days, the clay is spread in the garden. In some cities a public, eco-friendly process is used for the immersion.

== Recognition ==
On 10 July 2025, Government of Maharashtra declares it as state festival.

== Gallery ==
Cultural depictions of Ganesh Chaturthi
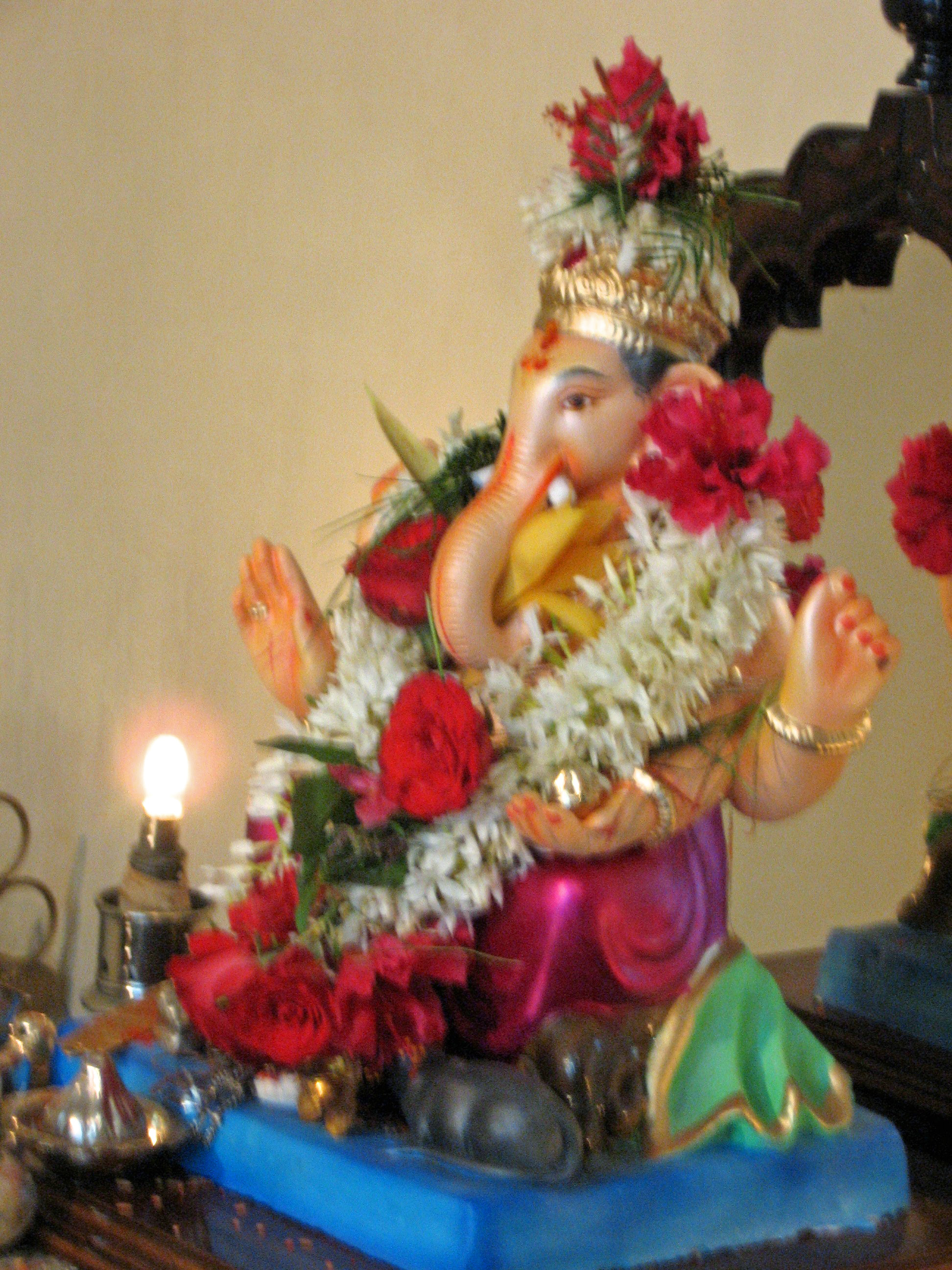
A Ganesh idol in a home during the festival

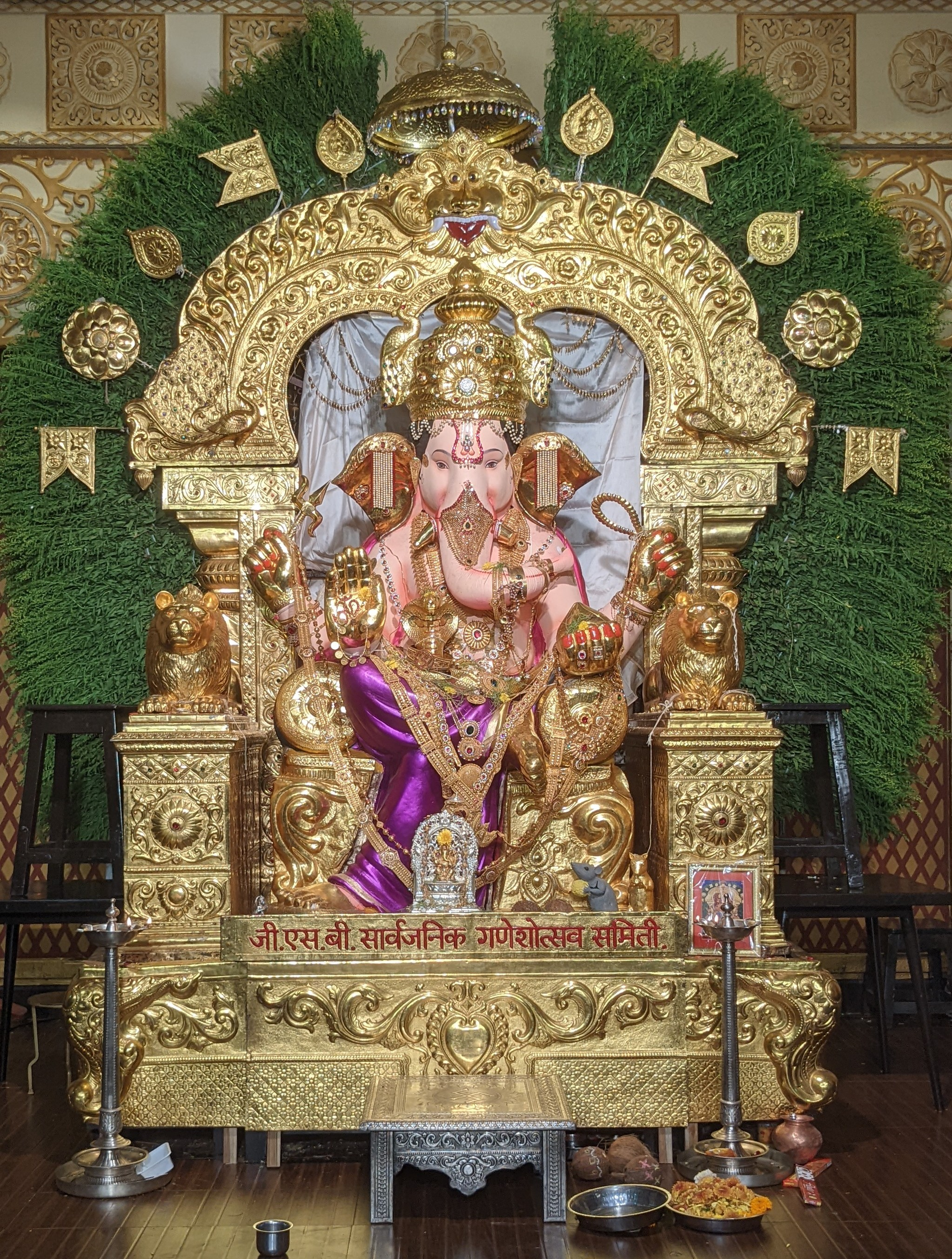
GSB Sarvajanik Ganeshotsav Samiti Shree Ram Mandir (Temple), Wadala, Mumbai

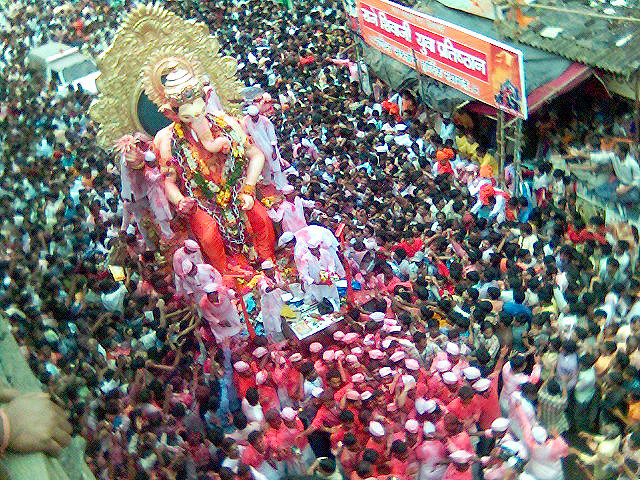
Procession of Lalbaugcha Raja in Mumbai

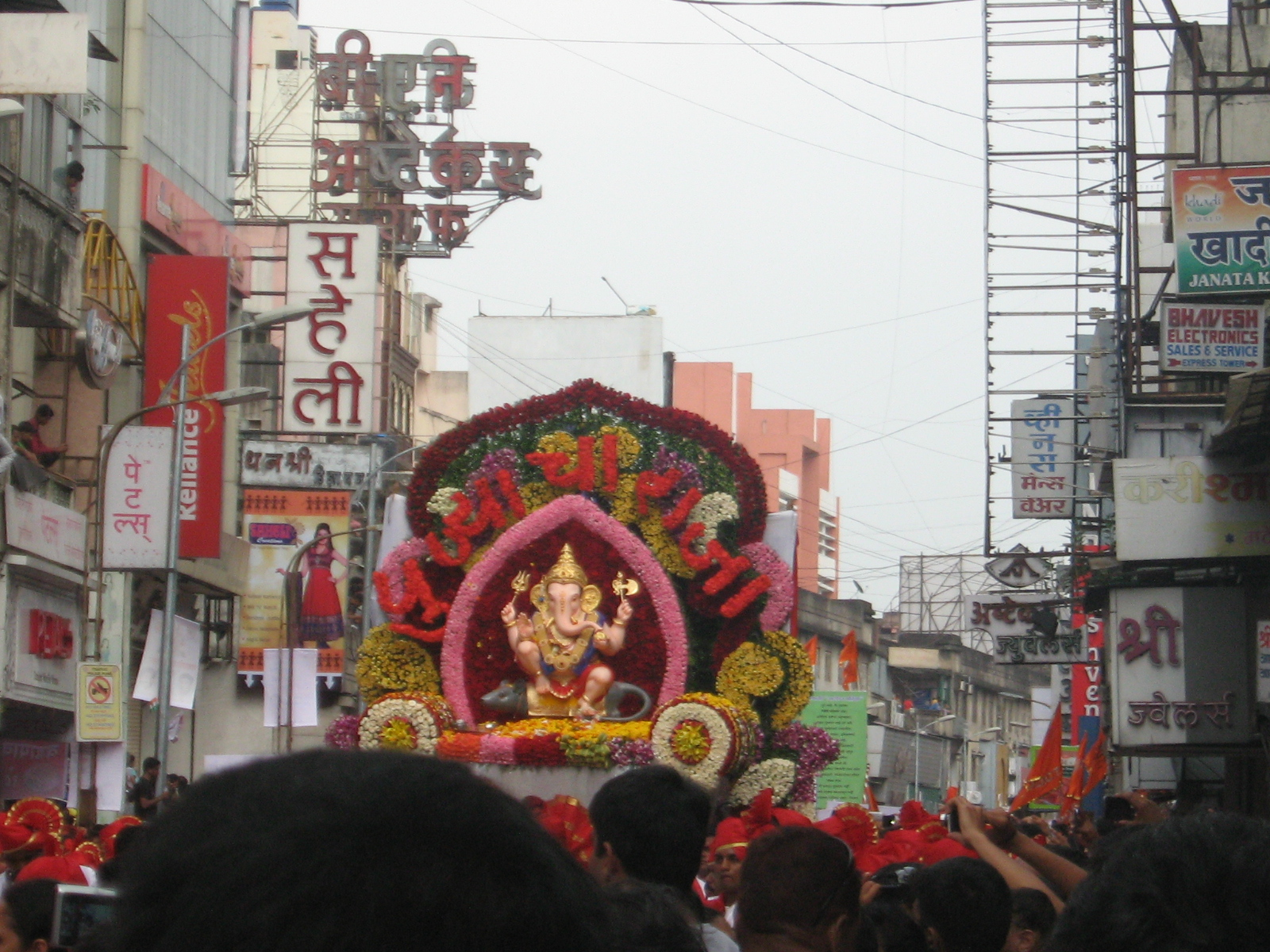
Procession in Pune

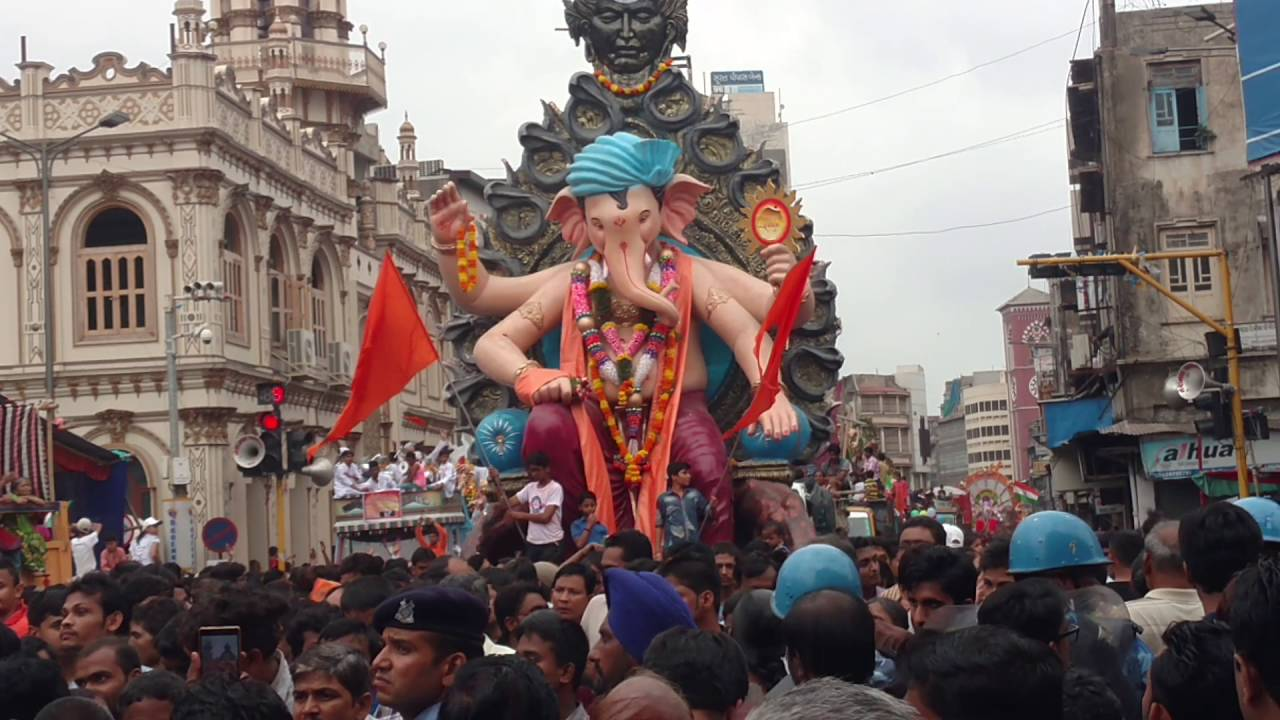
Procession in Surat

Procession in Mumbai

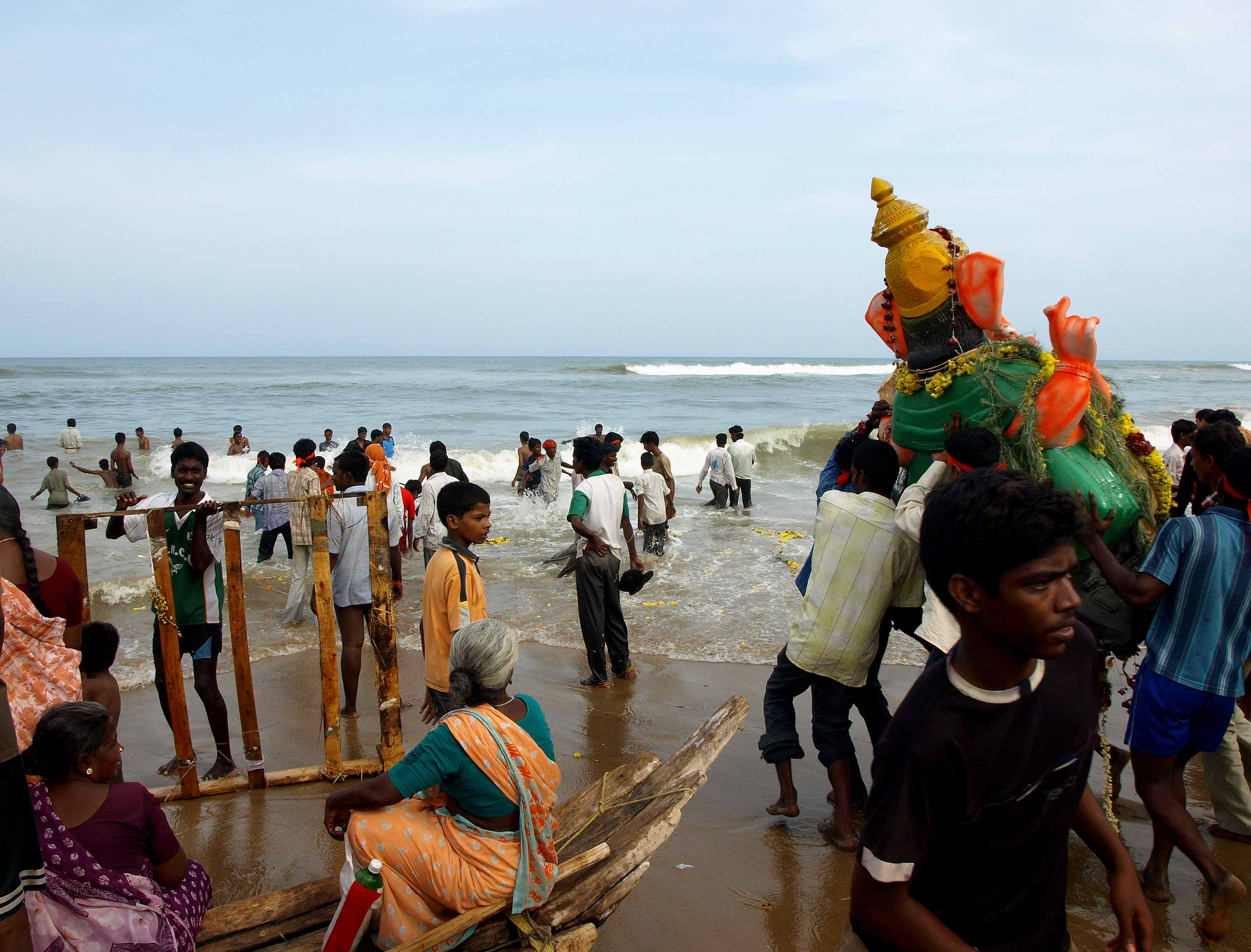
Immersion in sea, Chennai

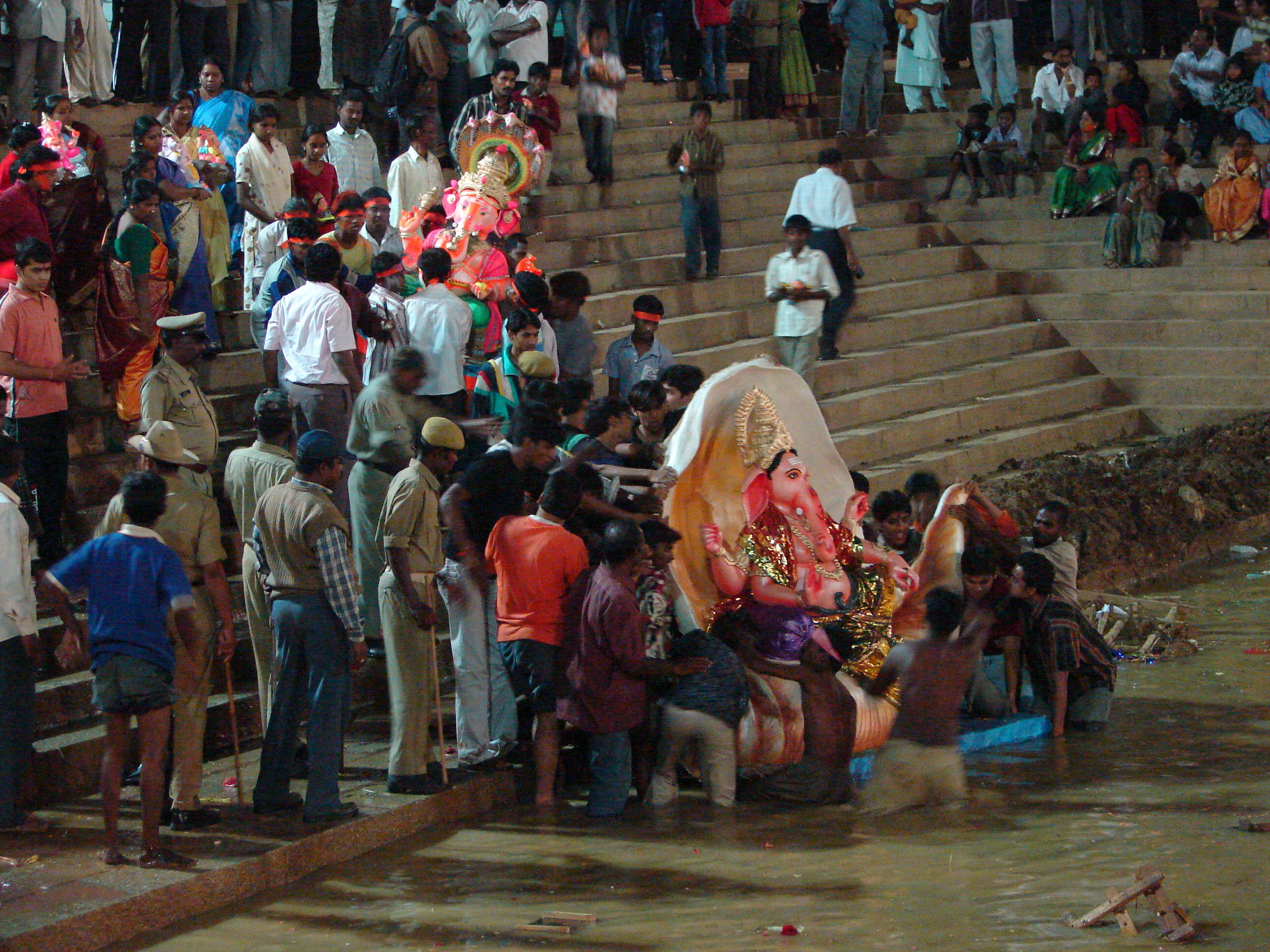
Immersion of idols in Bengaluru

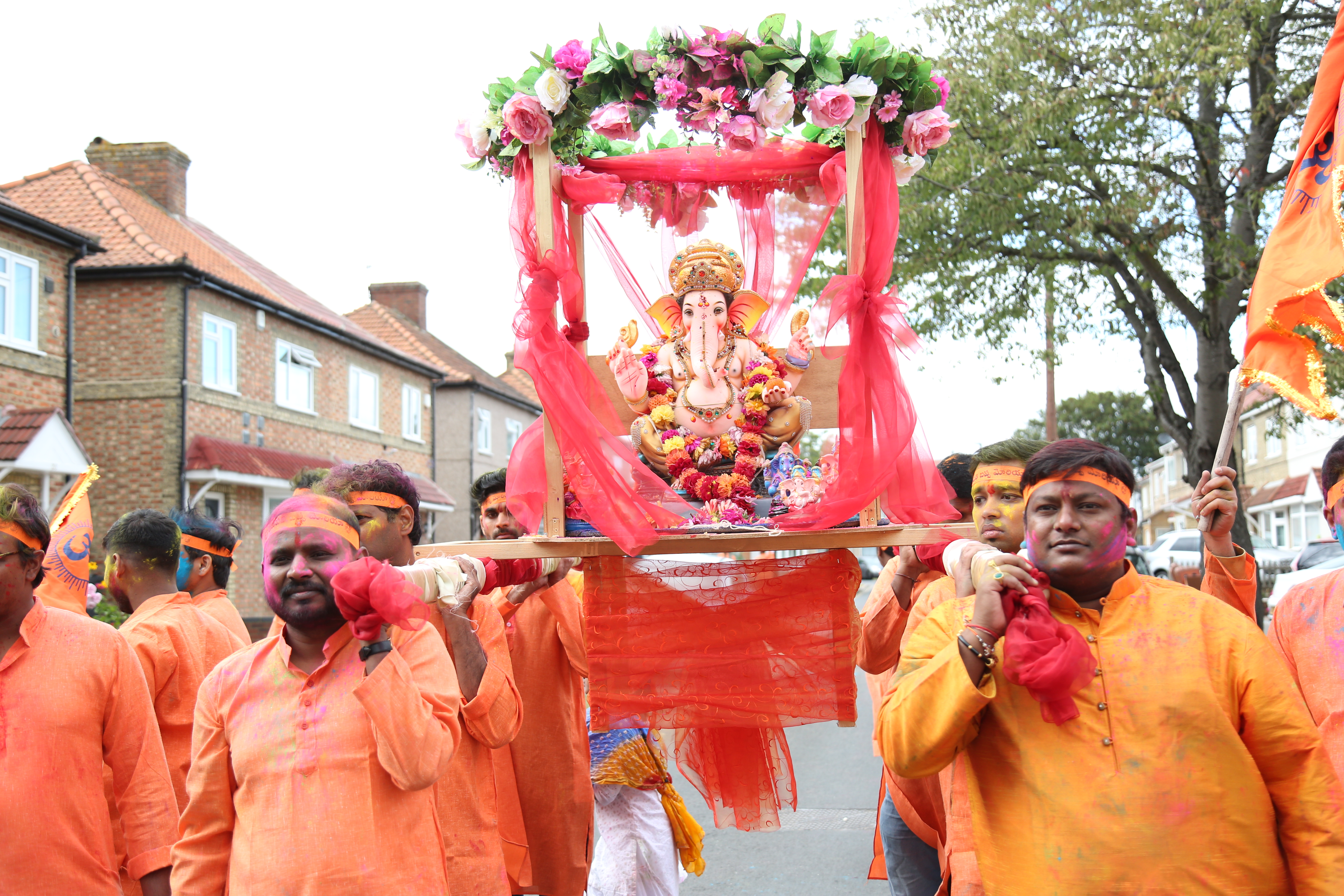
Hyderabad Friends Youth Ganesh immersion procession In London

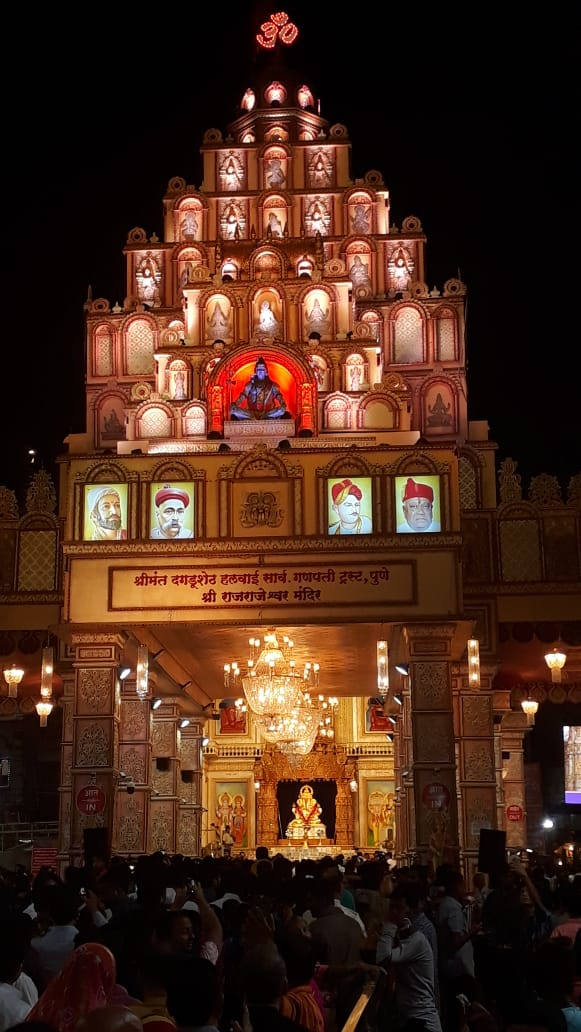
Celebration in Pune

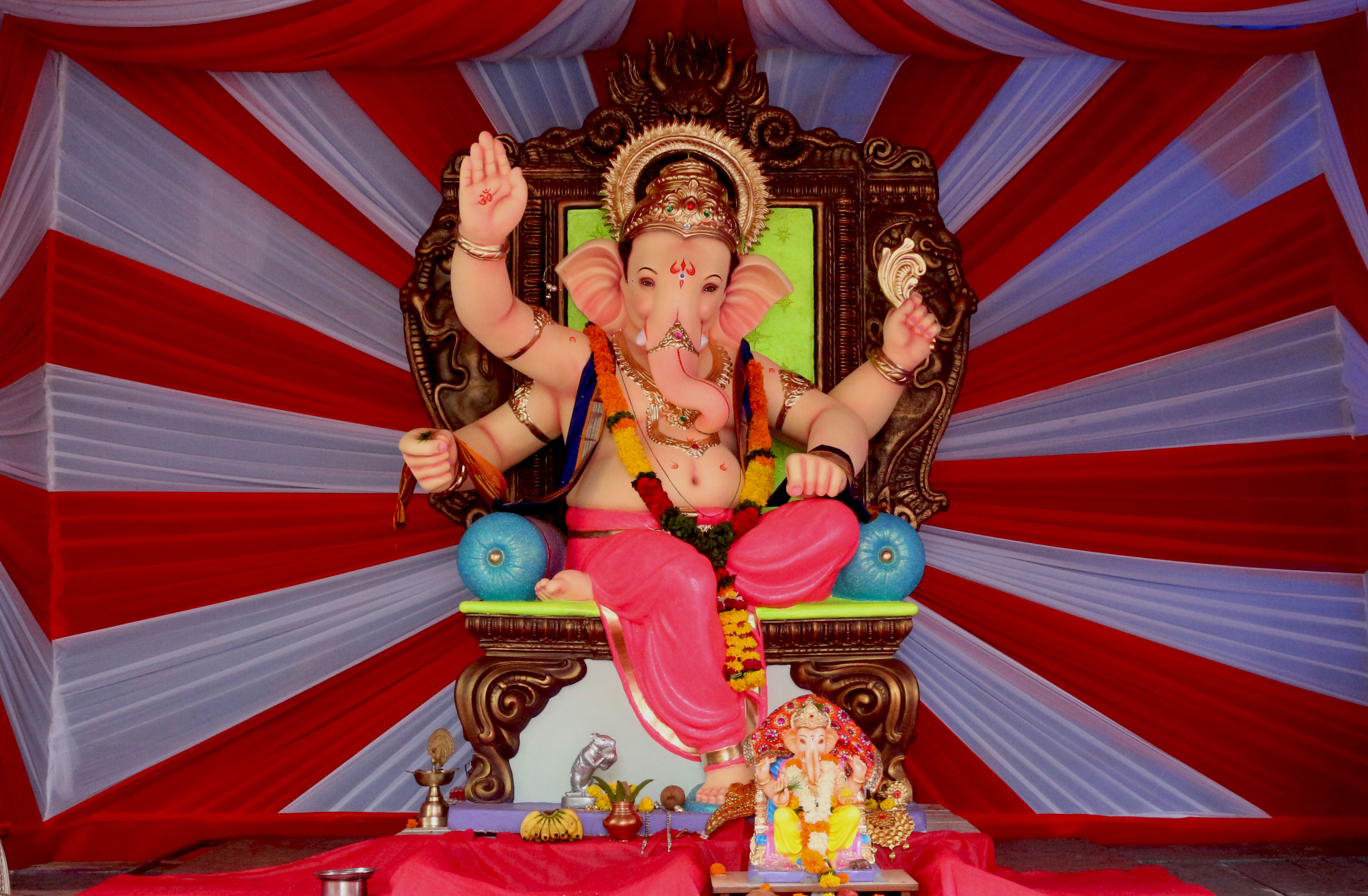
Juinagar Cha-Raja (King of Juinagar) Navi Mumbai

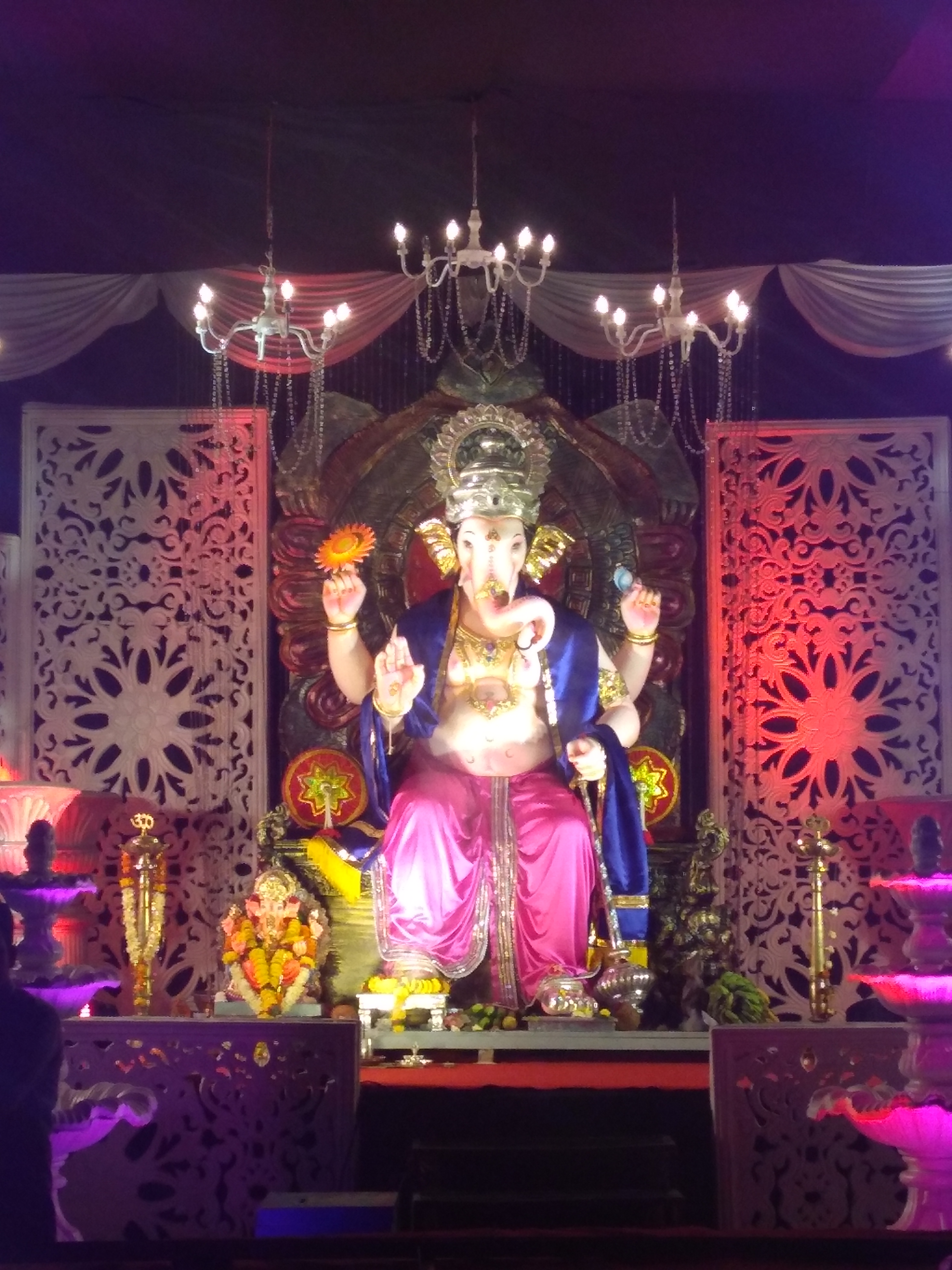
Khasbag Raja (King of Kashbag) Belgaum

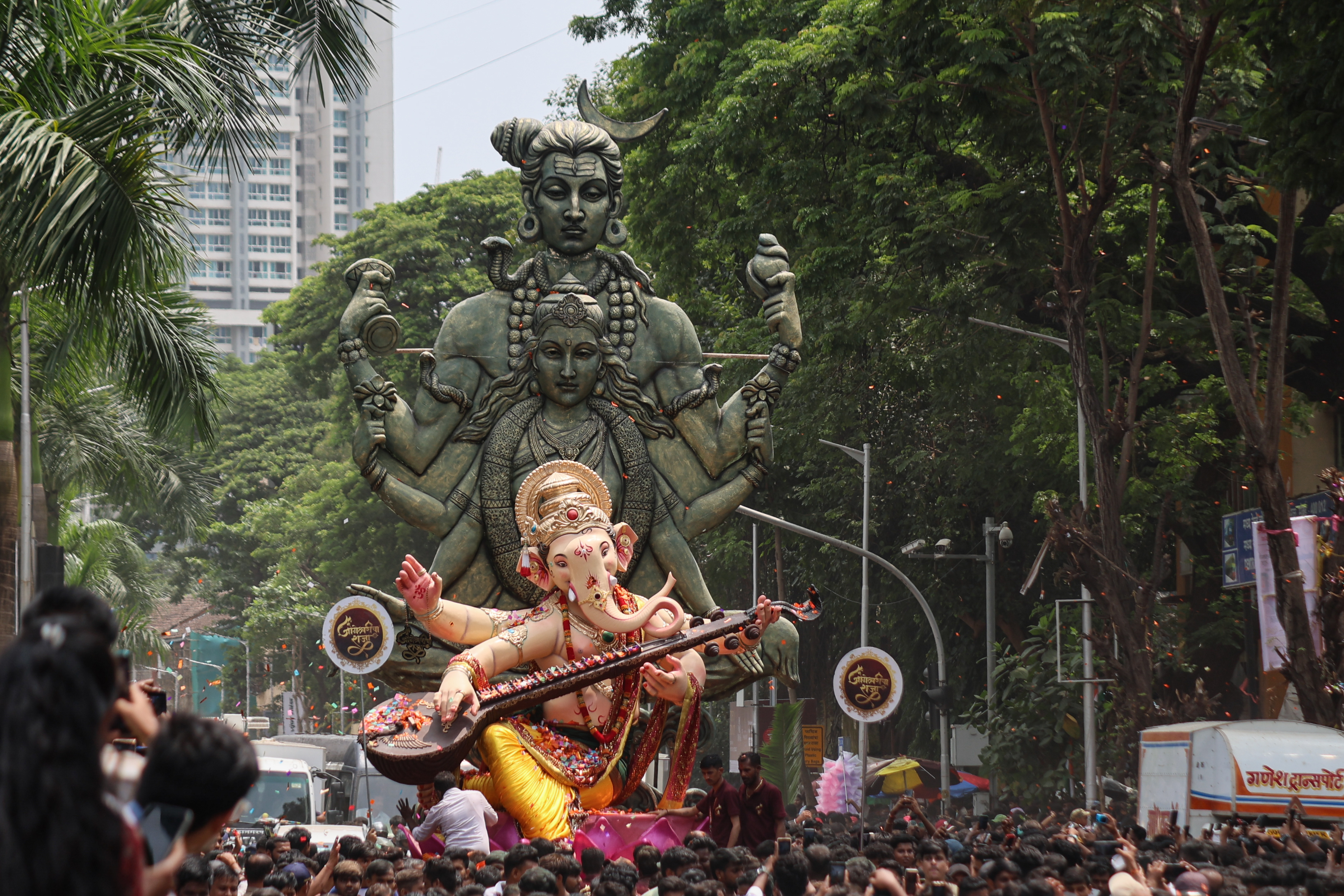
Jogeshwari Cha Raja (King of Jogeshwari) Mumbai

The Shrimant Bhausaheb Rangari Ganapati Idol in Pune

The Dagadusheth Halwai Ganpati idol in Pune

The famous Sindhoor Ganapathi of Chabbi, Karnataka

The famous Sindhoor Ganapathi of Chabbi, Karnataka

Khetwadi Cha Maharaja, Mumbai, Maharastra

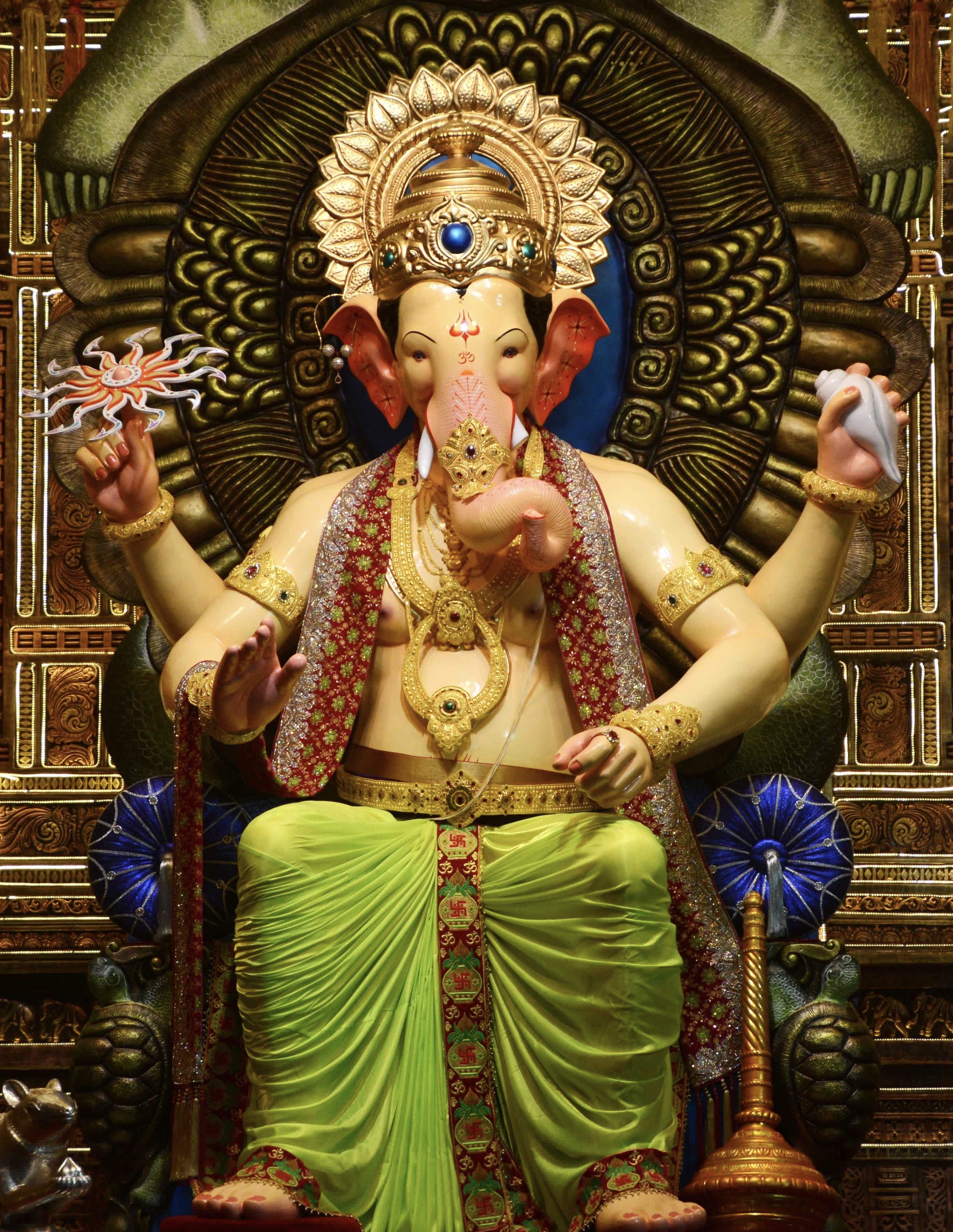
The famous Lalbaugcha Raja of Mumbai, Maharastra

The famous G.S.B Seva Mandal, Mumbai, Maharastra

Khetwadi Cha Raja, Khetwadi 1st lane, Mumbai, Maharastra

== See also ==
- 1994 plague in India – Outbreak of bubonic and pneumonic plague
- Cultural depictions of elephants
