= Chabbi Ganapathi =

Chabbi Ganeshotsava

A red-coloured Ganesha idol worshipped during the festival
- Also called: Chabbi Ganapathi, Chabbi Ganesh Utsav
- Observed by: Kulkarni family of Chabbi (seven houses)
- Type: Hindu religious festival
- Significance: Worship of a fierce (Ugraswaroopi), red-coloured form of Ganesha
- Celebrations: Purification rites, overnight music and Vedic recitation (Ashtavadan), elaborate puja, immersion
- Begins: Shuddha chaturthi, Bhadrapada month
- Ends: Third day (idol immersion after midnight)
- Frequency: Annual
- Location: Chabbi village, Hubli taluk
- District: Dharwad district
- State: Karnataka
- Country: India

Chabbi Ganapathi is a famous red-coloured (Sindhoor Ganapathi) that is worshipped by the households of the Kulkarni family from the village of Chabbi (Chebbi) in Dharwad District near Hubballi. The seven original families of this village celebrate this Chabbi Ganeshotsava. .

== History ==
Chabbi Ganeshotsava began in the year 1827.2026 marks 200th year celebration. According to the sources, a childless Brahmin named Tammappanna went in search of blessings to overcome his problems, he was then blessed by a saint named Krishnendra Swamiji, who advised him to worship Sindhoor(red coloured) Ganapathi for 3 days. Within a year of the celebration he was blessed with a son. From then on, the Kulkarni family has been following this tradition of celebrating Chabbi Ganeshotsava for 3 days every year. Initially what started as a tradition with family now has seven households following the same.

The famous Sindhoor Ganapathi of Chabbi, Karnataka

== Traditions ==
The Chabbi Ganeshotsava happens for only 3 days every year. Starting from the Chaturthi of the Bhadrapada month, the first day is the sthapana, which is usually done in the afternoon, followed by allowing visitors for darshana.. The second day and third days follow all the family traditions and pooja to be performed. Evenings are mostly dedicated to bhajan and keerthans. On the third day, post-midnight, the visarjana of Ganapathi takes place.

The most common belief of the local people here is to offer a whole areca nut (Adikebetta) to Ganapathi. The areca nut is then offered to Ganapathi and is given back to be kept at the temple of visitors' house and worship for one year. Visitors coming the following year get the same areca nut, offer it to the deity and take back a new one for the upcoming year. This tradition is followed for 3 years, believing that the wishes get fulfilled within that time. It is also believed that people return to visit Chabbi Ganapathi for consecutive 3-5 years depending on their prayer.

The Chabbi Ganapathi is commonly known as "varasiddi vinayaka" and "ugraswaroopi ganapathi" for his fierce look and red coloured feature. Unlike the other commonly seen Ganapathi, here he holds a broken tusk in his right hand and a lingam in his left. The hands behind hold other weapons.

== See also ==
- Ganesh Chaturthi
- Dharwad district
