= Haryana State Pollution Control Board =

- HSPCB

Agency overview
- Formed: 1976
- Agency executive: Sri K.K Khandelwal , IAS, Chairperson
- Website: https://hspcb.gov.in/

Haryana State Pollution Control Board was formed as statutory organisation by Government of Haryana in the year 1974 to preserve the wholesomeness of water and prevent water pollution after Government of India legislation of Water (Prevention & Control of Pollution) Act, 1974. The board was given additional responsibility to prevent Air Pollution from the year 1981 with the enactment of Air (Prevention and Control of Pollution) Act, 1981 and in general for implementation of Environment laws and rules.

== History ==
Haryana State Pollution Control Board was formed in year 1974 to preserve and maintain the wholesomeness of water with the passing of Water (Prevention & Control of Pollution) Act, 1974 and additionally air quality under Air (Prevention and Control of Pollution) Act of 1981.

== See also ==
- Central Pollution Control Board
- Andhra Pradesh Pollution Control Board
