= Shrimant Bhausaheb Rangari Ganapati Temple =

Temple in Pune, India

Shrimant ganpati Rangari Ganapati Temple
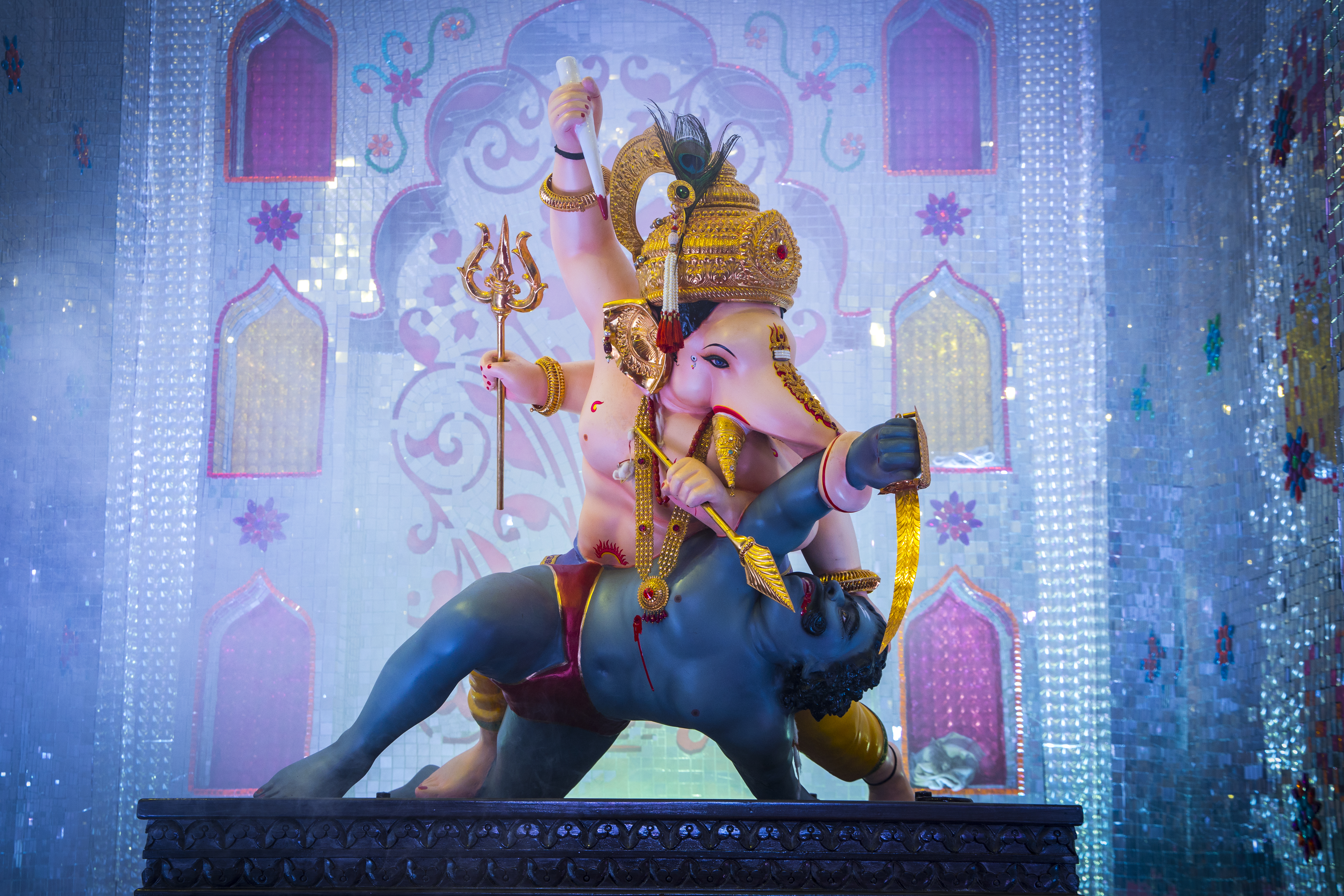
- Shrimant Bhausaheb Rangari Ganapati

Religion
- Affiliation: Hinduism
- District: Pune
- Deity: Ganesh

Location
- State: Maharashtra
- Country: India
- Interactive map of Shrimant ganpati Rangari Ganapati Temple

Website
- www.bhaurangari.com

Shrimant Bhausaheb Rangari Ganapati is a Ganesha idol in Pune. It was the first Sarvajanik Ganesha (community celebration of the Ganesha festival) of India.

== Ganesha’s Idol ==
Shrimant Bhausaheb Rangari did the emplacement of this Ganesha's idol in 1892. The idol depicts Ganesha killing the demon. This is unique and different idol, it is made by wood and bran. The idol is not changed since the day it was emplaced. Bhausaheb was actively involved in revolutionary movement before independence. So, his dream of freedom is depicted in this Ganesha idol which shows the victory of good over evil.

== Background ==
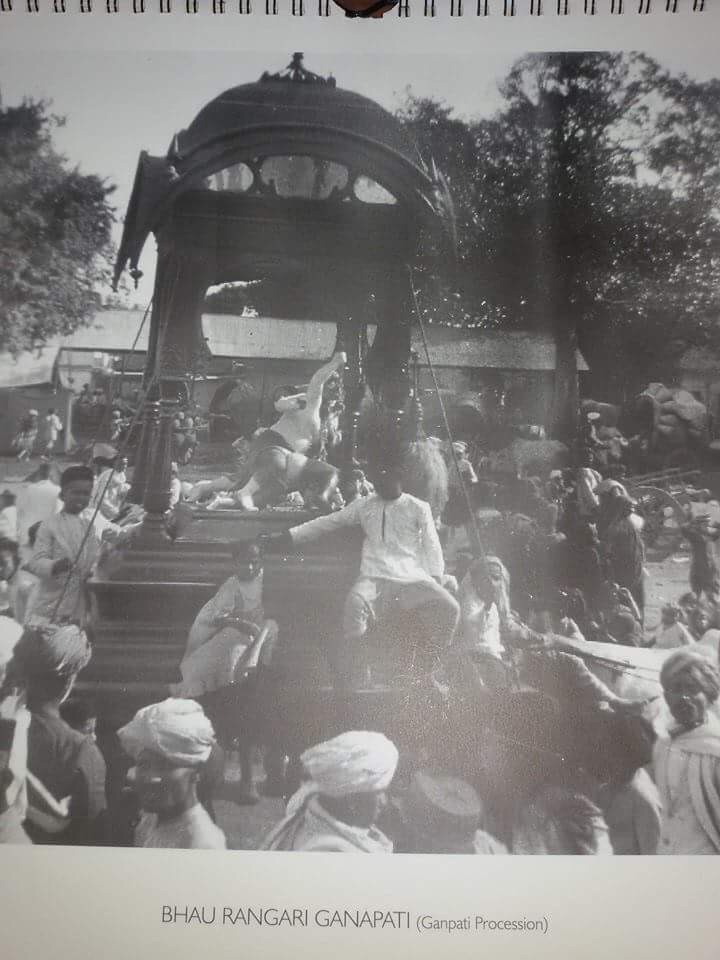

In 1857 Mangal Pandey led the first riot with weapons against British Empire and that was the start of freedom fight in India. British claimed this as the rebellion of the army and closed all the doors of possibilities for freedom fighters. But this riot has left the mark on whole country and soon the effects of it came to notice in different parts of country. This riot has exuded the thought of freedom and lit the fire of revolution. After 1857 riots, British government started doing suppression which was creating obstacles in reaching these thoughts to the common citizens.

In the latter of 18th century revolutionary Shrimant Bhausaheb Rangari aka Bhau Lakshman Jawle was taking efforts towards freedom in Pune. Shrimant Bhausaheb Rangari is one of the most well known and leading man in Pune. His full name was Bhausaheb Lakshman Jawle. Shrimant Bhausaheb Rangari was King's physician (Rajvaidya. He had his eleemosynary clinic at his residence.) Patients from all over the country used to come to him for treatment. Bhausaheb himself was a modern man with spiritual thinking. He had studied hard about religious topics. He stayed behind the Shanivaar Wada. It was called as Shalukar's Bol. In this area Shaloo knitting and coloring work was done. Shrimant Bhausaheb Rangari had the profession to colors these Shaloos which gave him the surname Rangari.
