= Ganesh Aagman =

Celebration for arrival of Lord Ganesha

View of a Lord Ganesha's grand idol during the Ganesh Aagman at Koparkhairane in Navi Mumbai.

The Ganesh Aagman (Marathi: गणेश आगमन) in Hinduism refers to the grand arrival or homecoming of Lord Ganesha's idols into homes and public pandals just before the Ganesh Chaturthi festival in India. It is majorly observed in the city of Mumbai, Navi Mumbai and other cities in the state of Maharashtra in India. It is celebrated with great pomp and show in the city of Mumbai in Maharashtra. On this occasion, an arrival procession called Aagman yatras accompanied by of a large number of devotees is carried out by the organiser. It is considered as the pre-celebration of the Ganeshotsava before the Ganesh Chaturthi. The iconic slogan "Ganpati Bappa Morya" is the major slogan among the devotees, that is chanted by the participants in processions of the Ganesh Aagman Yatras.

== Description ==
In the local tradition, it is called as Ganesh Aagman Sohala. It is conducted on different dates by different Puja committees or households. It is basically the journey of Ganesha's idols from the sculpturor house or artists place to the location of the pandals or individual homes where the Ganesh Puja is going to be performed. During the journey, the newly crafted Lord Ganesha's idol is ceremonially welcomed by devotees amid the beats of dhol-tasha, devotional songs or music and saffron flags in their hands.

Devotees carrying saffron flags during a Ganesh Aagman Yatra.

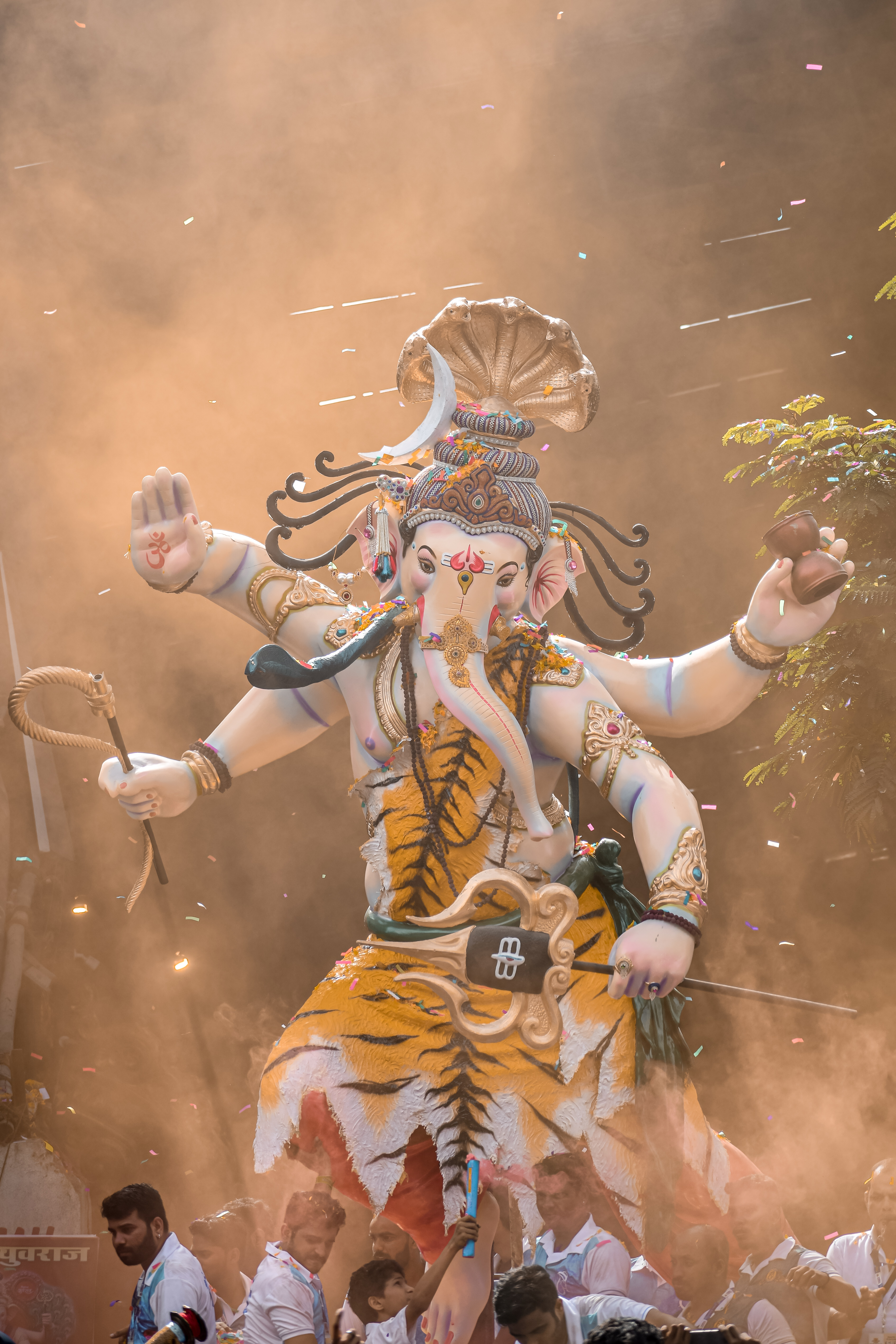
Devotees enjoying the Ganesh Aagman.

The celebration of the Ganesh Aagman Sohala is a unique tradition of welcoming newly crafted idols of Lord Ganesha in the Marathi culture of Hinduism in the region of Maharashtra and its surroundings. It starts more than a month before the festival of the Ganeshotsava in the metropolitan region of Mumbai. The streets of Lalbaug-Parel area in the city of Mumbai are most famous for the processions of Ganesh Aagman yatras. The residents of these areas called Mumbaikars wait for a whole year to welcome the iconic Ganesh Aagman Yatras.
