= Andhra Pradesh Pollution Control Board =

Indian pollution control agency

Agency overview
- Formed: 1976
- Jurisdiction: Government of Andhra Pradesh
- Headquarters: Vijayawada, Andhra Pradesh, india
- Minister responsible: Pawan Kalyan, Ministry of Environment
- Agency executive: Kaveti Vijayanand, IAS, Chairperson
- Website: https://pcb.ap.gov.in/UI/Home.aspx

Andhra Pradesh Pollution Control Board (APPCB) is a statutory organisation of Government of Andhra Pradesh to implement Environment protective laws and rules.

It was established on 24 January 1976 to control water pollution in Andhra Pradesh. The additional responsibility to control air pollution was given in 1981.

== See also ==
- Haryana State Pollution Control Board
- Awaaz Foundation
