= Wadala Bridge monorail station =

Wadala Bridge

General information
- Location: Rafi Ahmed Kidwai Road, Wadala Village, Wadala, Mumbai
- Coordinates: 19.017431°N 72.859315°E
- System: monorail station
- Owner: Mumbai Metropolitan Region Development Authority (MMRDA)
- Line: Line 1
- Platforms: 2
- Tracks: 2
- Connections: Western Wadala Road

Construction
- Structure type: Elevated
- Platform levels: 2
- Parking: No
- Cycle facilities: No

History
- Opened: 3 March 2019; 7 years ago

Passengers
- 2019: 1000 daily

Services
| Preceding station | Mumbai Monorail | Following station |
|---|---|---|
| Acharya Atre Nagar towards Chembur | Line 1 | Dadar (East) towards Sant Gadge Maharaj Chowk |
Out-of-system interchange
| Preceding station | Mumbai Suburban Railway | Following station |
| Sewri towards Chhatrapati Shivaji Terminus | Harbour line transfer at Vadala Road | King's Circle towards Goregaon |
| Sewri towards Chhatrapati Shivaji Terminus | Harbour line transfer at Wadala Road | Guru Tegh Bahadur Nagar towards Panvel |
Route map
- Sources: Google Maps
Location
- Location within Mumbai

Wadala Bridge is a monorail station on Line 1 of the Mumbai Monorail located at Wadala Village in the Wadala suburb of Mumbai, India. Lies on the Rafi Ahmed Kidwai Road which is nearby Wadala Road railway station.

Wadala Bridge Monorail station connects with Wadala Road railway station with the length of 150m far. There is a demand for renaming Wadala Bridge monorail station into Nana Fadnavis Bridge Monorail station for becoming relatable.
