= Bandra railway station =

Railway Station in Maharashtra, India

Bandra

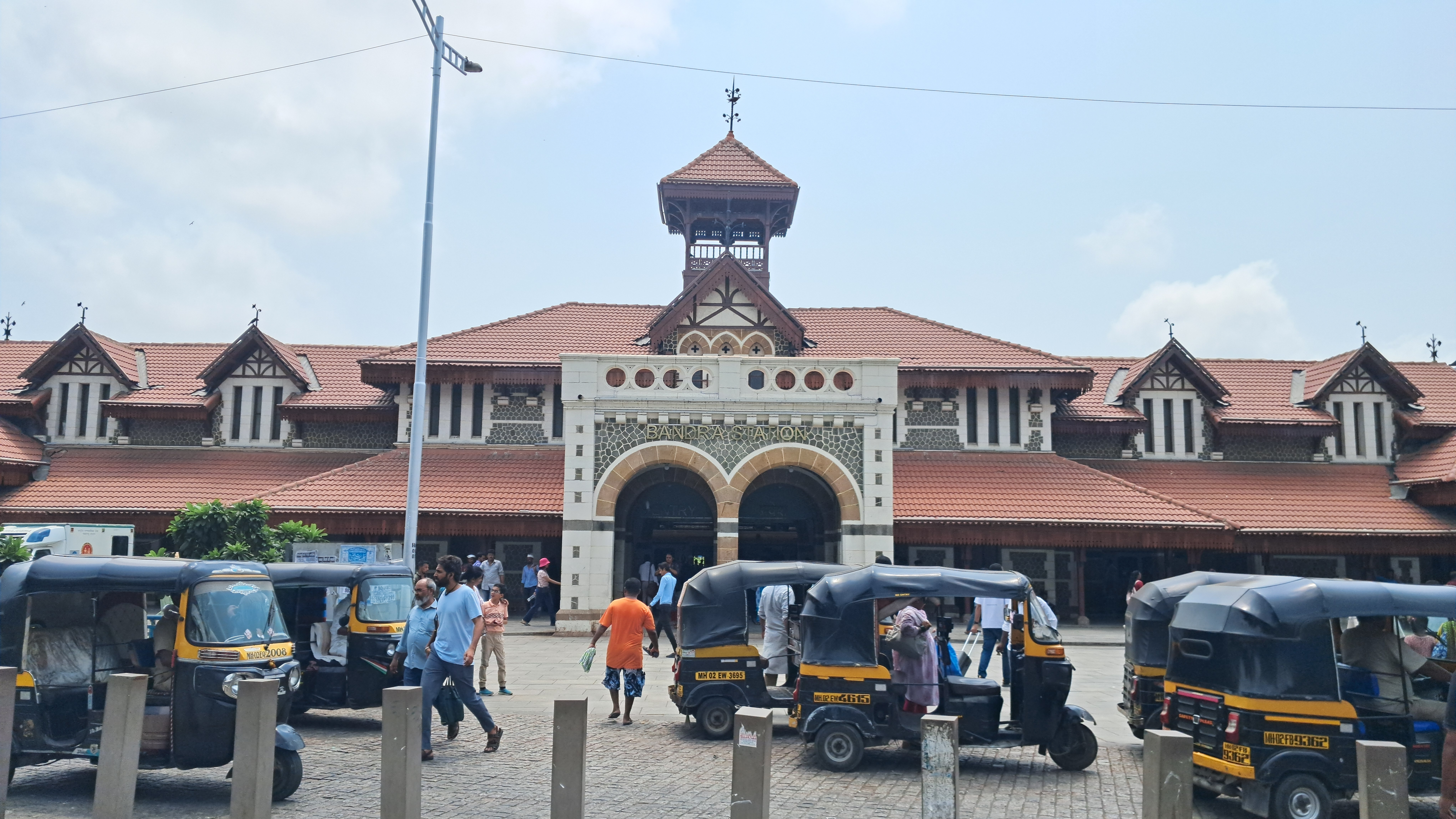

General information
- Coordinates: 19.054444°N 72.840556°E
- System: Mumbai Suburban Railway station
- Owner: Ministry of Railways, Indian Railways
- Lines: Western line, Harbour line
- Platforms: 7 + 1 (under construction)
- Tracks: 8
- Connections: Line 2B Bandra

Construction
- Structure type: Standard on-ground station
- Parking: No
- Cycle facilities: No

Other information
- Status: Active
- Station code: B (suburban); BA (mainline)
- Fare zone: Western Railway zone

Passengers
- 2012-13: 4,91,106

Services
Preceding station	Mumbai Suburban Railway	Following station
Mahim Junction towards Churchgate	Western line	Khar Road towards Dahanu Road
Mahim Junction towards Chhatrapati Shivaji Terminus	Harbour line	Khar Road towards Goregaon
Route map
Location
- Location within India Location within Maharashtra Location within Mumbai

Bandra (/bæːndra/; station code: B for Suburban services and BA for Indian Railways) is a railway station on the Western line and Harbour line of the Mumbai Suburban Railway network. It serves the Bandra suburban area and the commercial area of the Bandra Kurla Complex (BKC). Bandra Terminus is near Bandra railway station and serves interstate traffic on the Western Railway.

The station is a Grade-I heritage structure. The other 4 railway stations on Mumbai's heritage list include Chhatrapati Shivaji Maharaj Terminus, Western Railways Headquarters Building (Churchgate), Byculla railway station and Reay Road railway station.

All fast and slow commuter trains have a halt at this station. Bandra is also directly connected to Victoria Terminus through Harbour line via Wadala Road. BEST buses are also available from Bandra Terminus bus stand or Bandra (West) bus stand; both being very close to the railway station. Auto rickshaws are also available.

== History ==
Bandora (today's Bandra) was among the stations on the BB&CI Railway line when the section from Grant Rd to Ahmedabad was opened on 28 November 1864. Three buildings were completed for the BB&CI railway at Bandora in February 1867. They were to accommodate the slaughterhouse designed by the then Municipal Engineer, Russel Aitkens. These were built of rubble masonry, with facings of Porebunder sandstone, with iron roofs that were ventilated from above. The floors were of finely dressed basalt, set in cement, and well drained. The slaughter houses were shifted from Bori Bunder (near the Bori Bunder station) since their reek offended passengers. Bombay's first Municipal Commissioner Arthur Crawford, relocated these to Bandra. There were two buildings to store mutton, and one for storing beef. These were located nearly 100 yards South-West of Bandra station. A meat train was commenced by the BB&CI railway, but it was discontinued in January 1879, in favour of Bullock Carts. In 1888, it had two platforms. The main building adjoining the platform no.1 was too completed that year.

Bandora station (today's Bandra station) is mentioned as one of the stations where the first Regular Suburban rail service (commenced on 12 April 1867) halted.

After GIP Railway (today's Central Railway) closed its Mahim Branch (see Mahim Railway station), a joint railway service started between GIPR's Bori Bunder station and Bandora station. There is an interesting anecdote about this service, as reported by The Bombay Gazette of 14 June 1867. The story went that the timings of this joint service interfered with GIPR's own Callian Train (Callian was the old name for Kalyan). The traffic managers of both rail companies agreed upon 9 a.m as the time of departure for that joint train from Bandora. However, later the GIPR traffic manager changed the timings of their Callian train to 15 minutes earlier, the result being, both the trains met at Dadur (Dadar). This led to dispute and whistle of both trains with one another for the right of way at the Parell junction (Parel). The points man would then either allow the Bandora train, or the Callian train first. The Callian train would stop at every station, meaning that when it was allowed first, the Bandora train would also be stopped at some station before (as the writer reported sarcastically, in the "pleasant" steaming weather), delaying it by 12-15 min by the time it reached its destination. On the other hand, it would arrive 3–5 minutes earlier when let first. This would happen five days a week. The writer said that the issue lay with the GIPR that timed the Callian train within two minutes of the other train. He wrote that this would be seen as simply a case of rivalry and jealousy among both companies by the public. He ended with suggesting that simply pushing the timings of the Callian train back by 5 minutes would remedy the situation.

By 1873, out of the 24 locals that ran daily, 8 halted at Bandra. By 1892, there were 27 Bandra locals, and by 1900, there were 29 Bandra locals. After the remodeling schemes of Borivali and Virar stations, attention was given for a hump shunting yard at Bandra, due to the inadequacy of goods accommodations at Dadar Junction, Carnac Bridge Goods yard, and Grant Rd goods yard. After the opening of the Mahim link between BB&CI and Bombay port trust railway, the location of the yard was finally determined, and it was set up in 1916. (see diagram below)

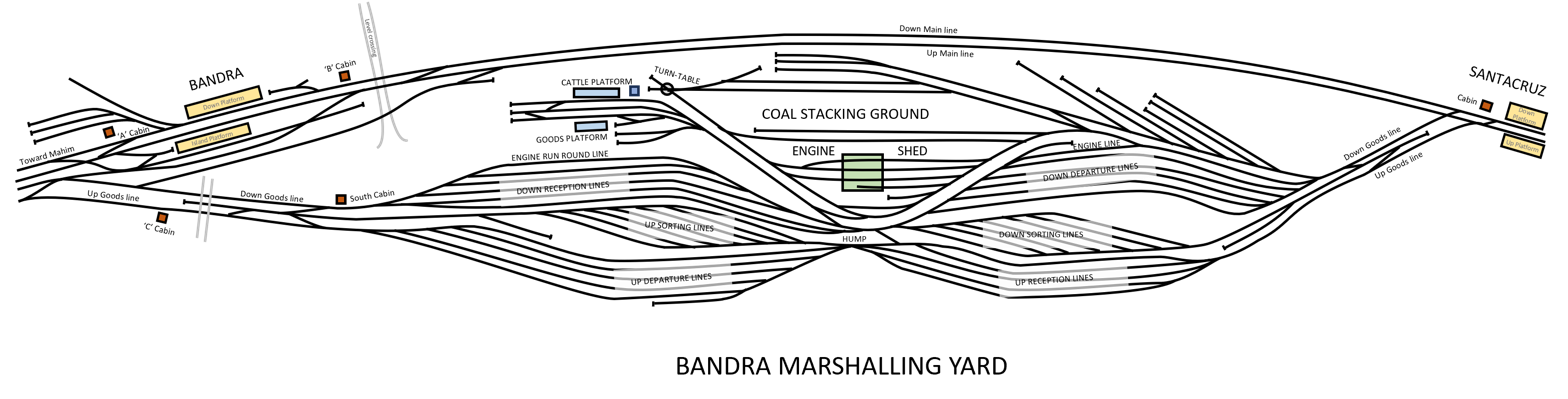
Bandra Yard in 1923

Tracks were Quadrupled between Mahim and Bandra in late 1910s. The section was opened for Goods traffic in May 1917, and for Passenger traffic in October 1920.A BB&CI magazine from December 1923 (from which the above information was procured) states that remodeling schemes for the remaining terminal stations i.e., Bandra and Andheri, were under preparation at that time.

A major renovation project was completed in 2023.

== Gallery ==
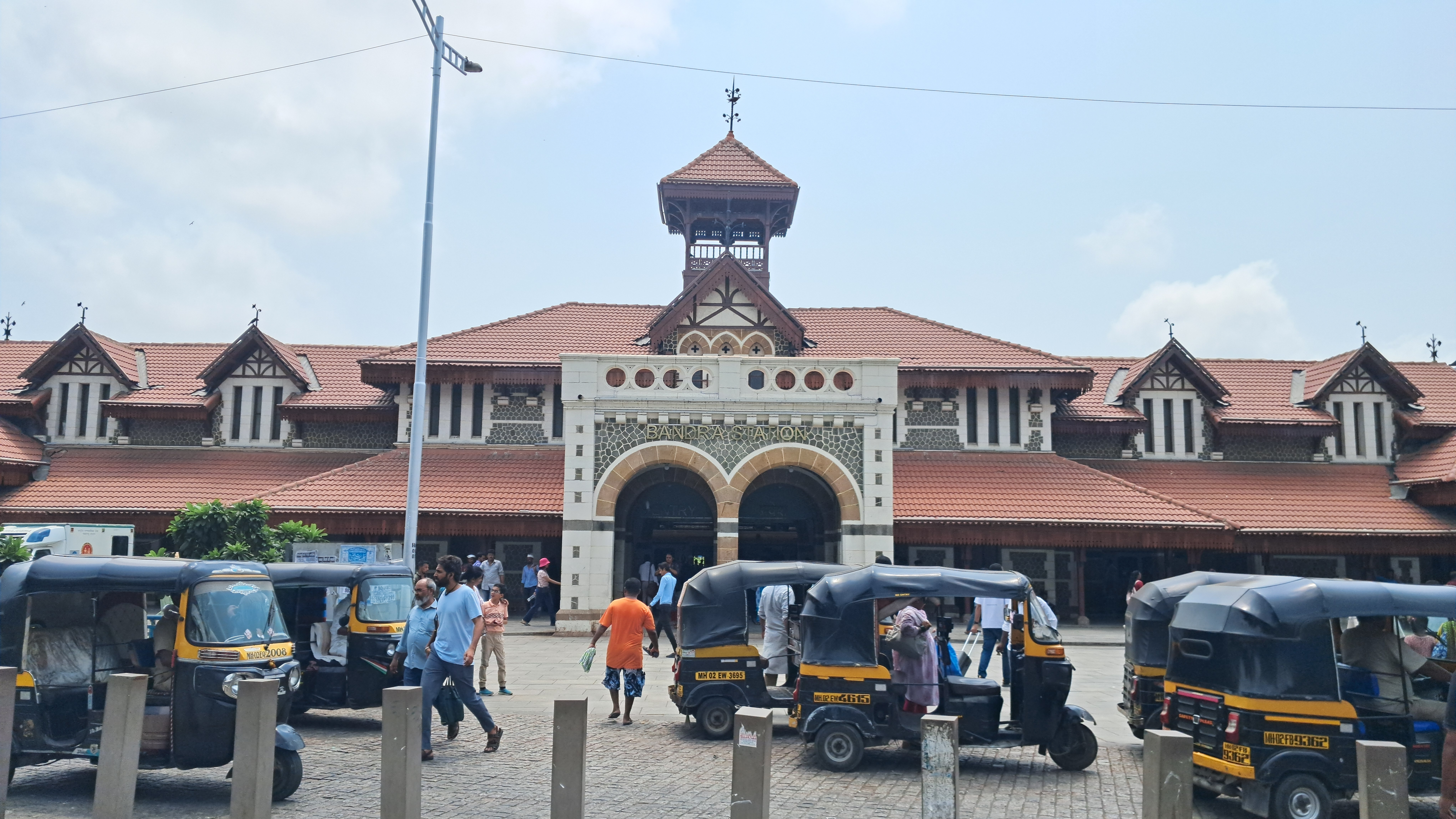
A front view of the Bandra Station Building

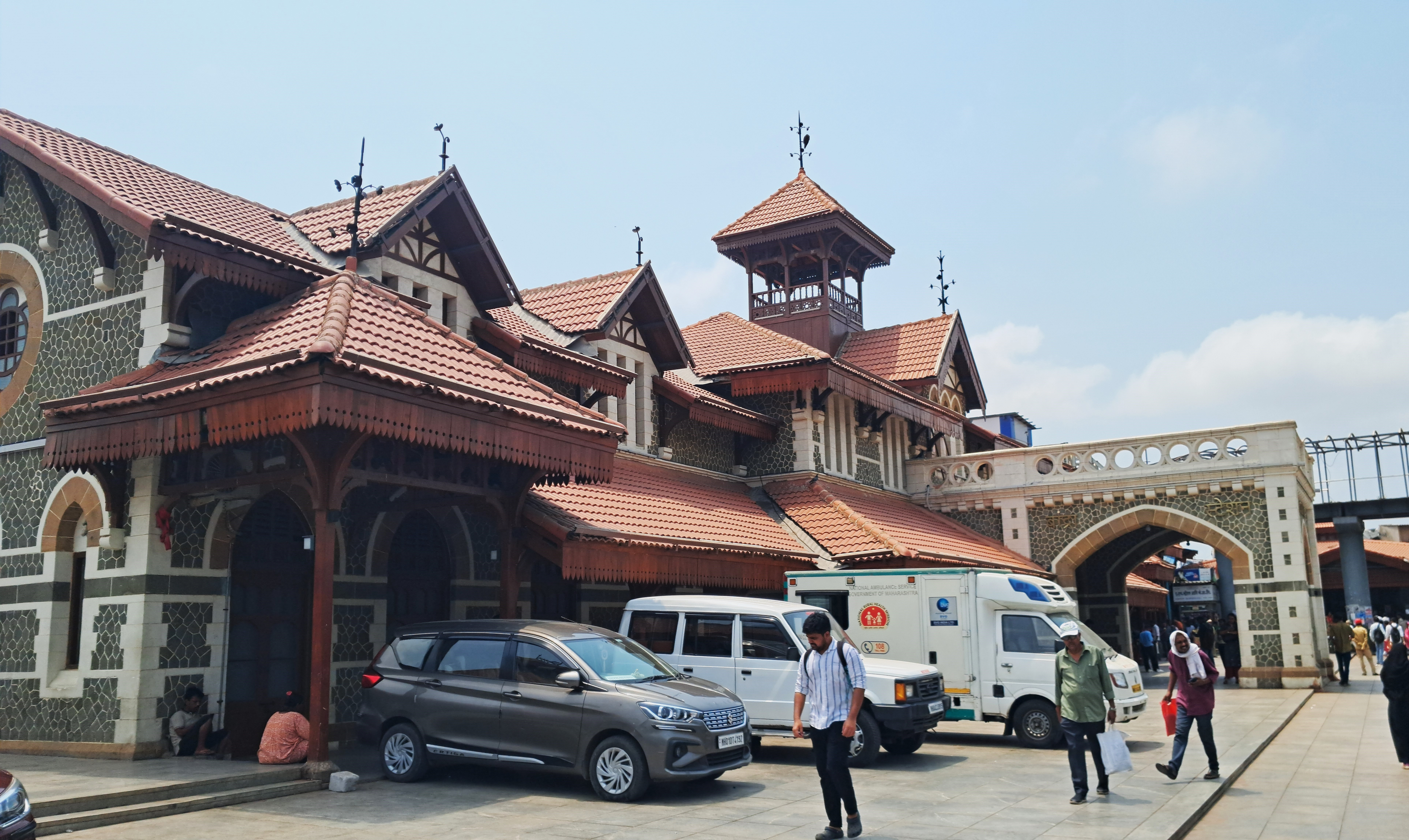
An Oblique view of the stn building

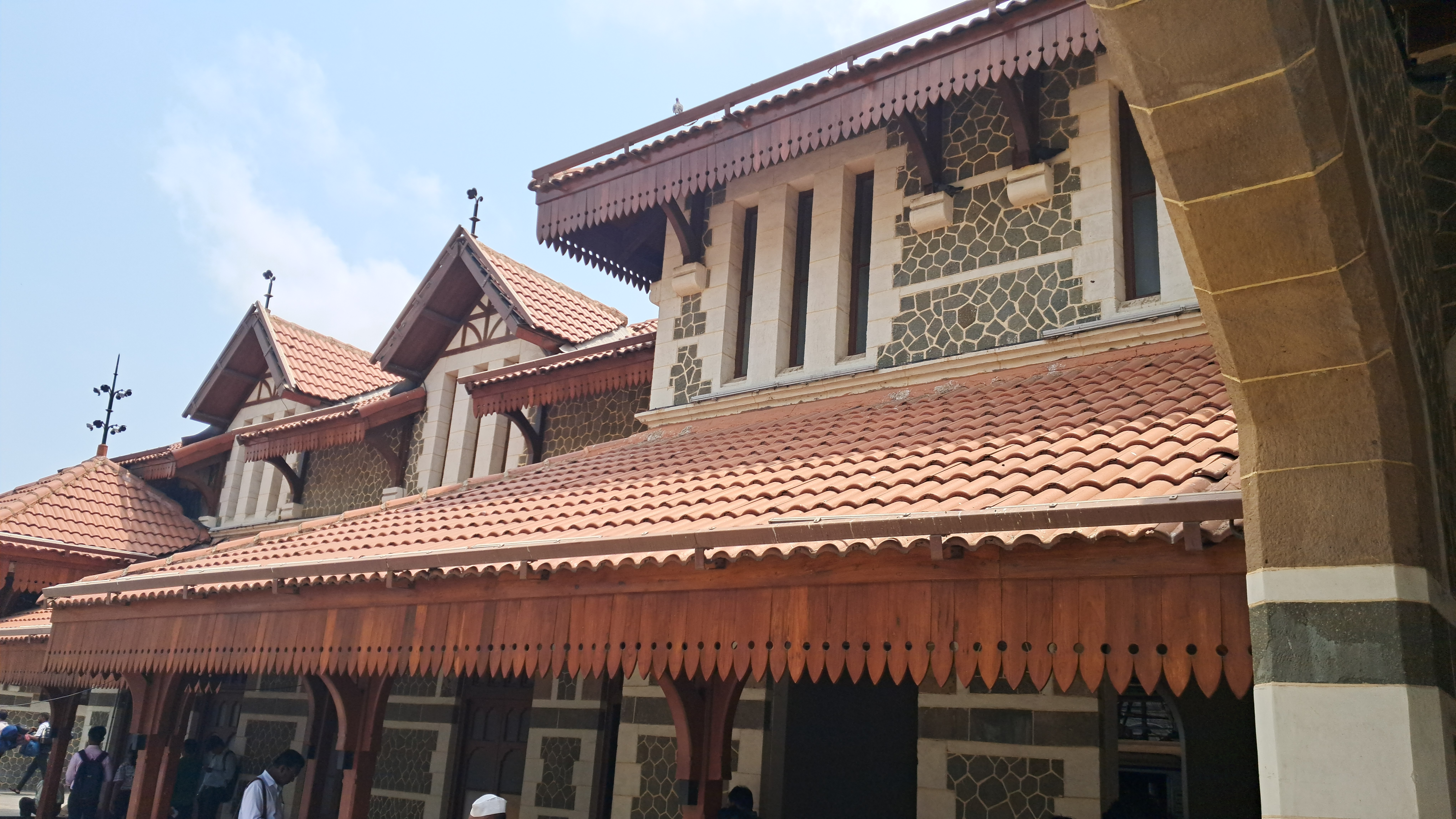
Intricate designs on the roof of the building

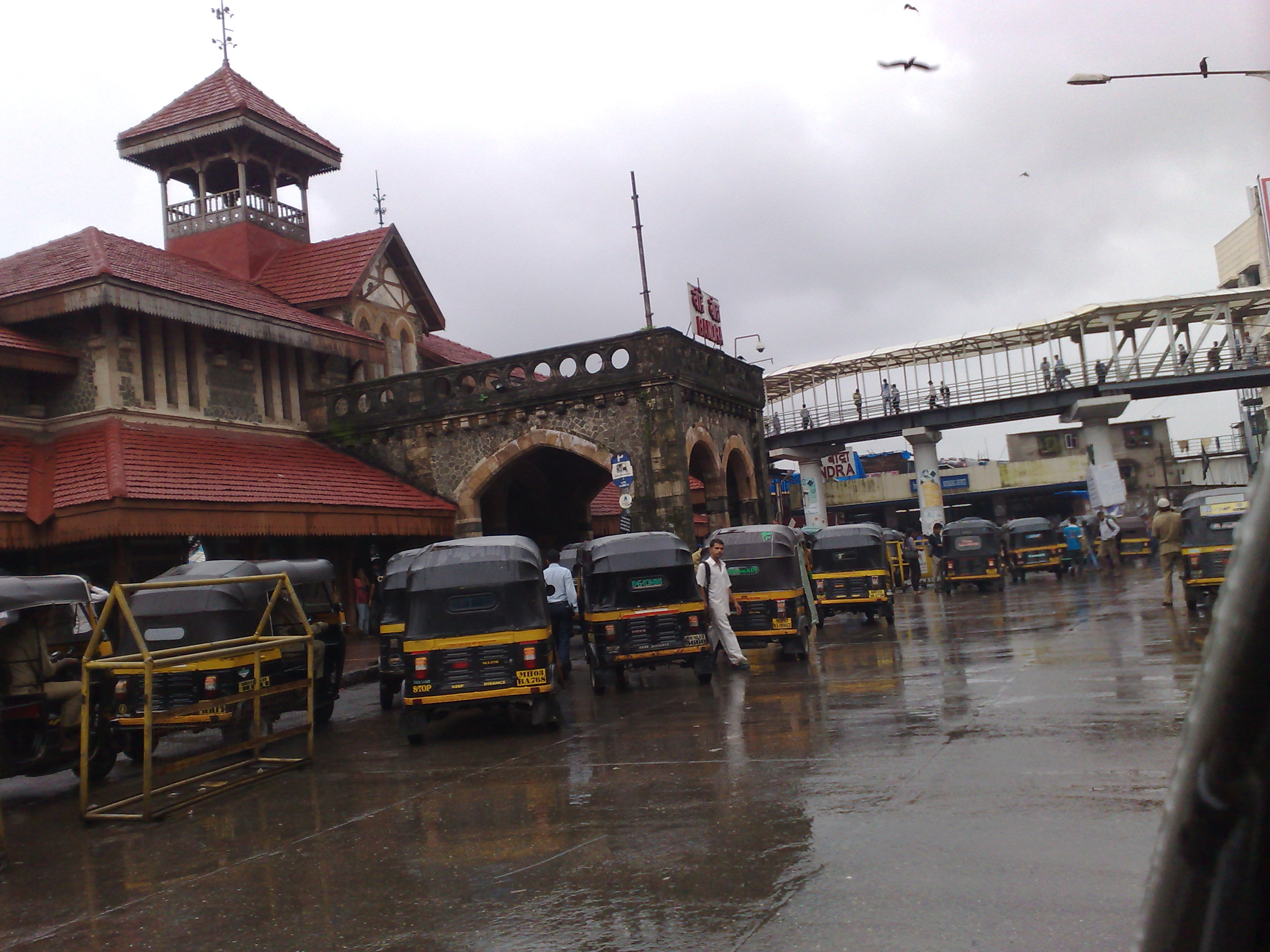
Bandra Railway station (West)

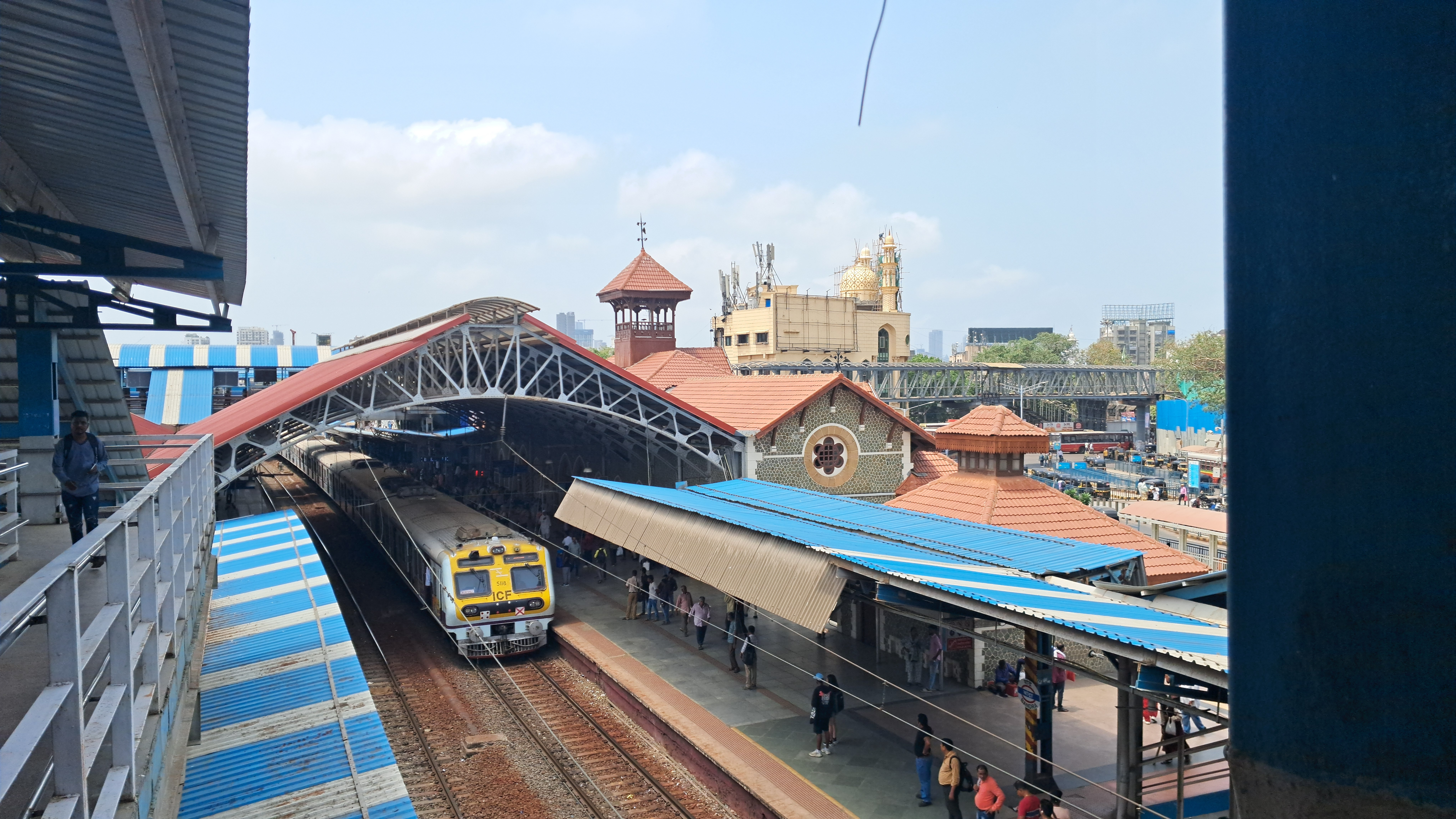
A Local Train entering into the station. View of FoB

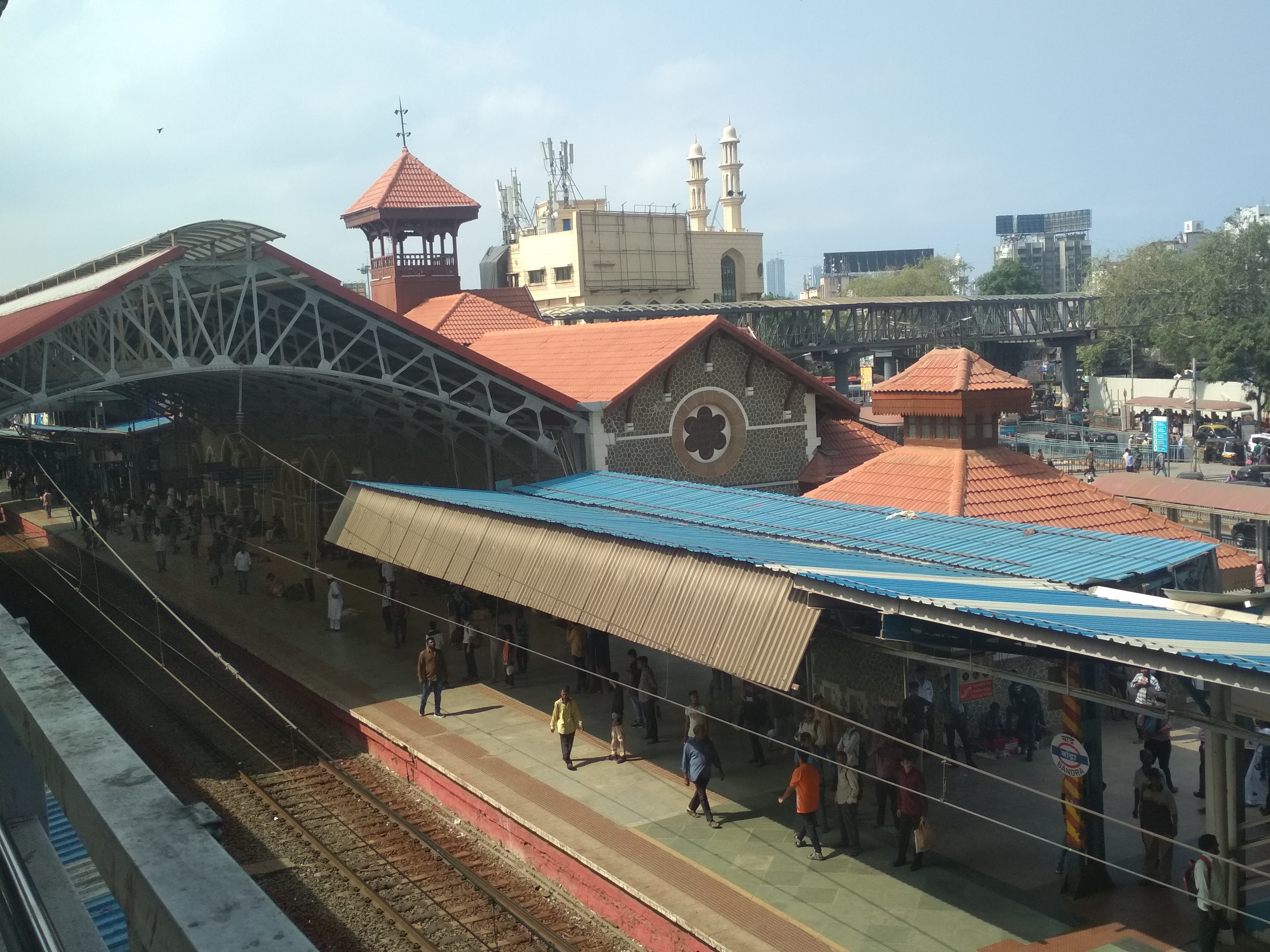
A picture showing Bandra Station main building, and Platform Roof

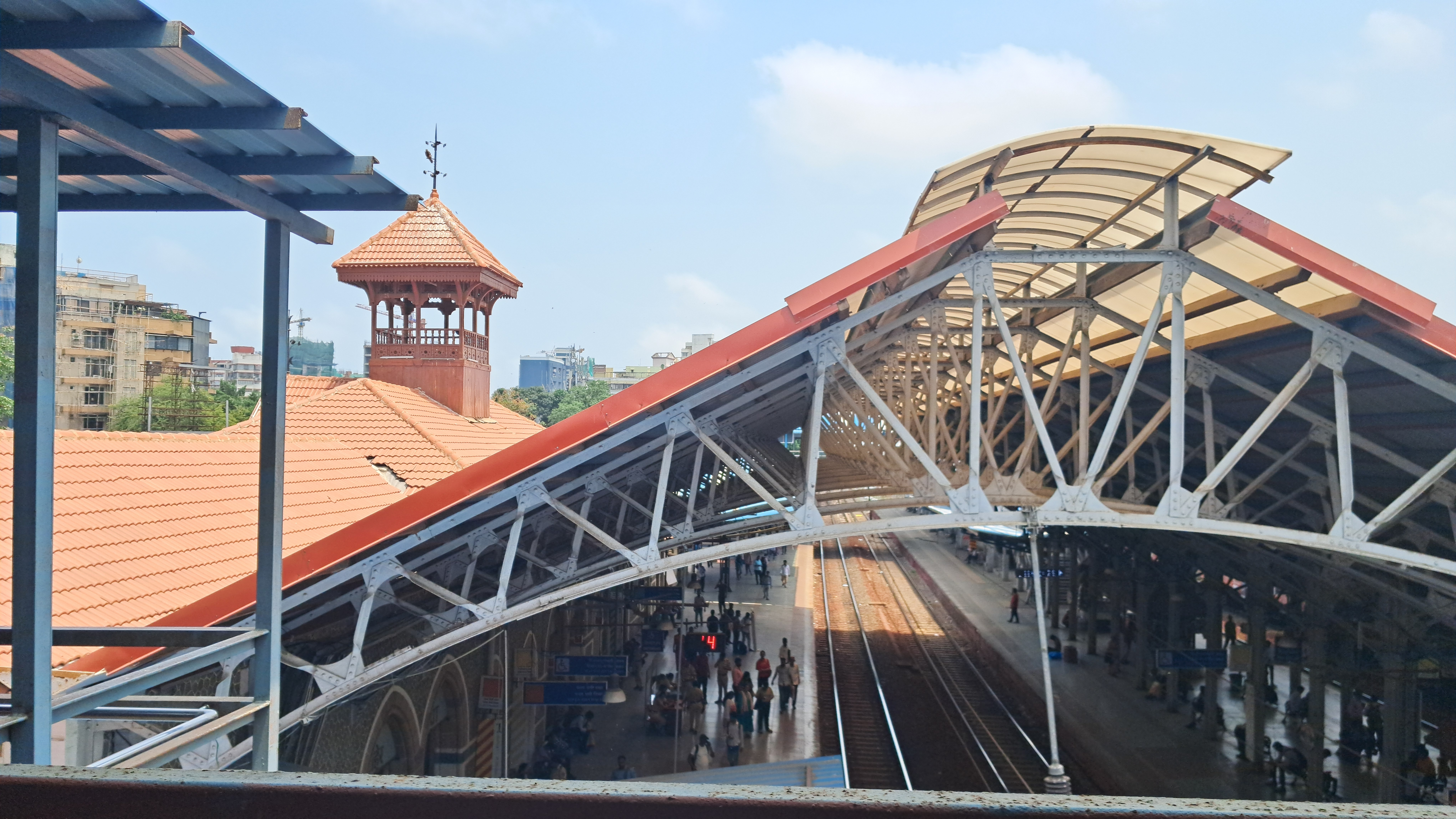
A view of Bandra Stn's roof from FoB

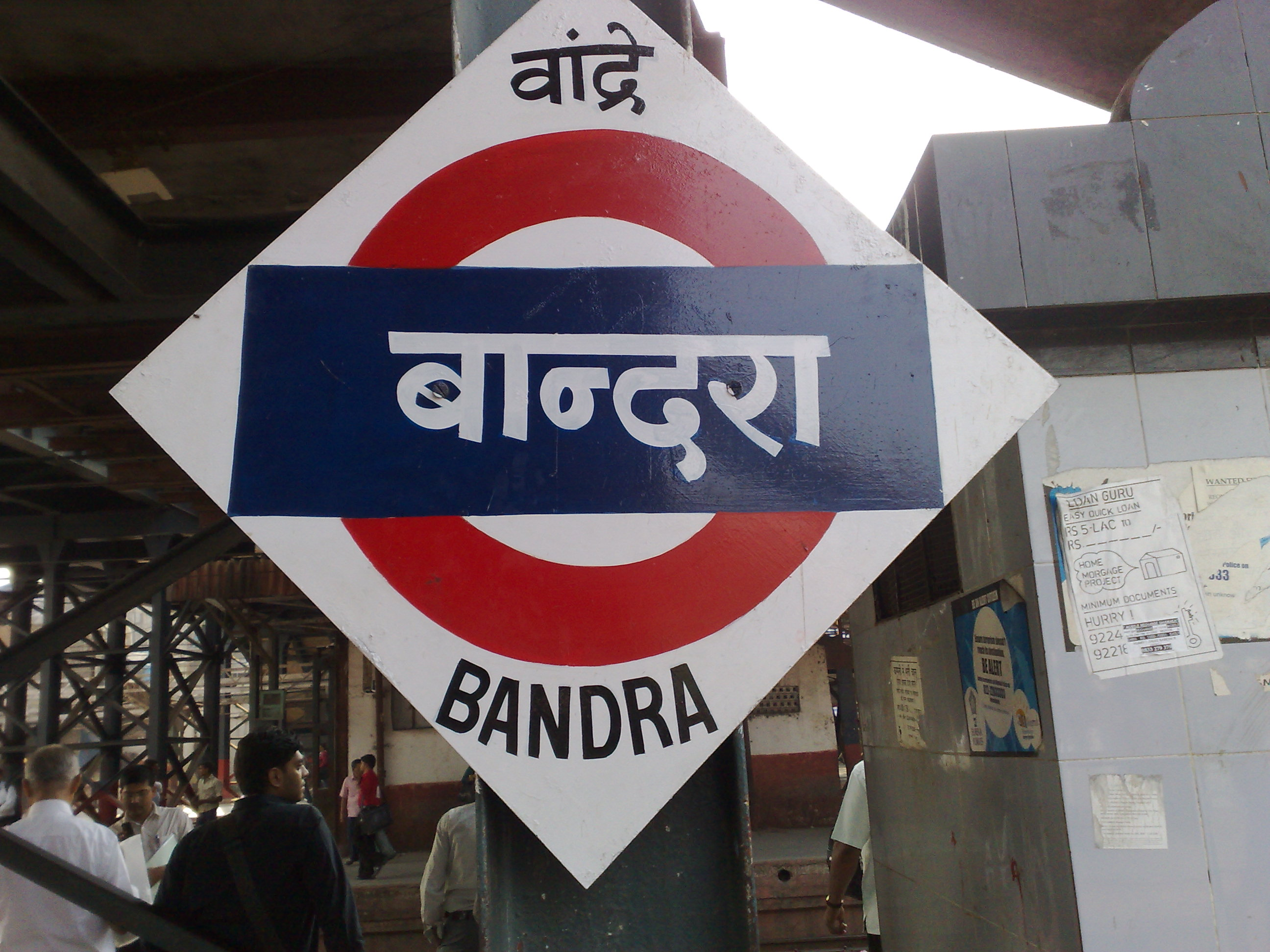
Bandra stn platform board

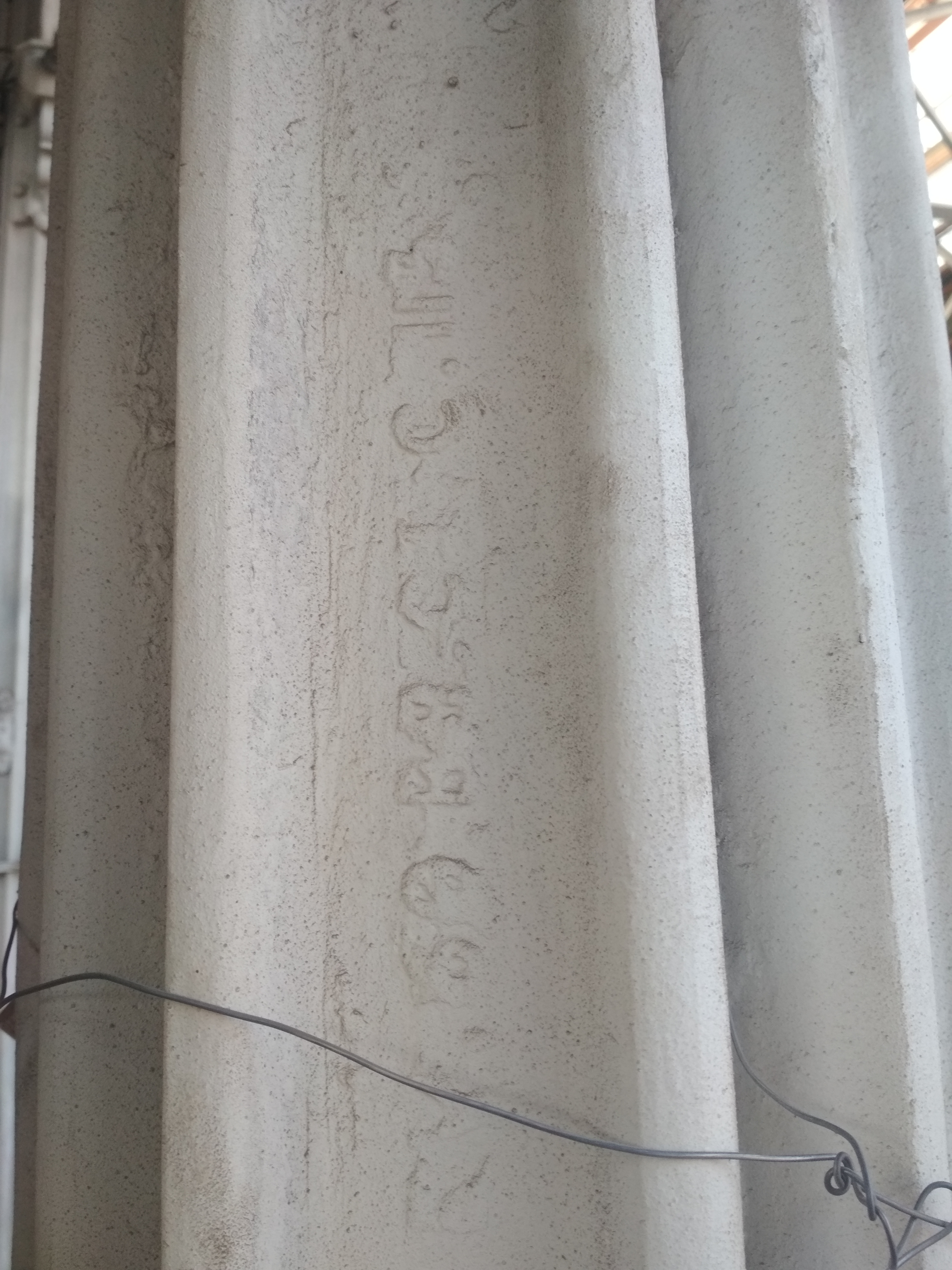
The pillars of the Platform roof made up of Old Double Headed railway tracks.

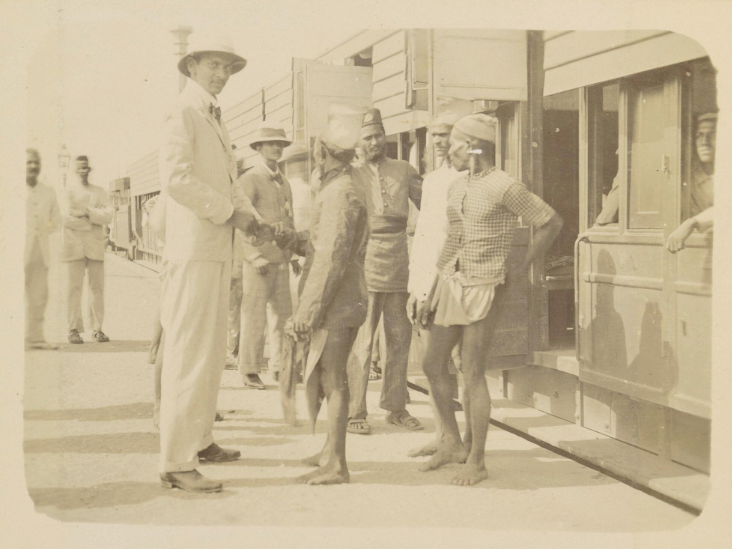
Medical examination of arrived passengers during Plague outbreak at Bandra Railway station in 1890s

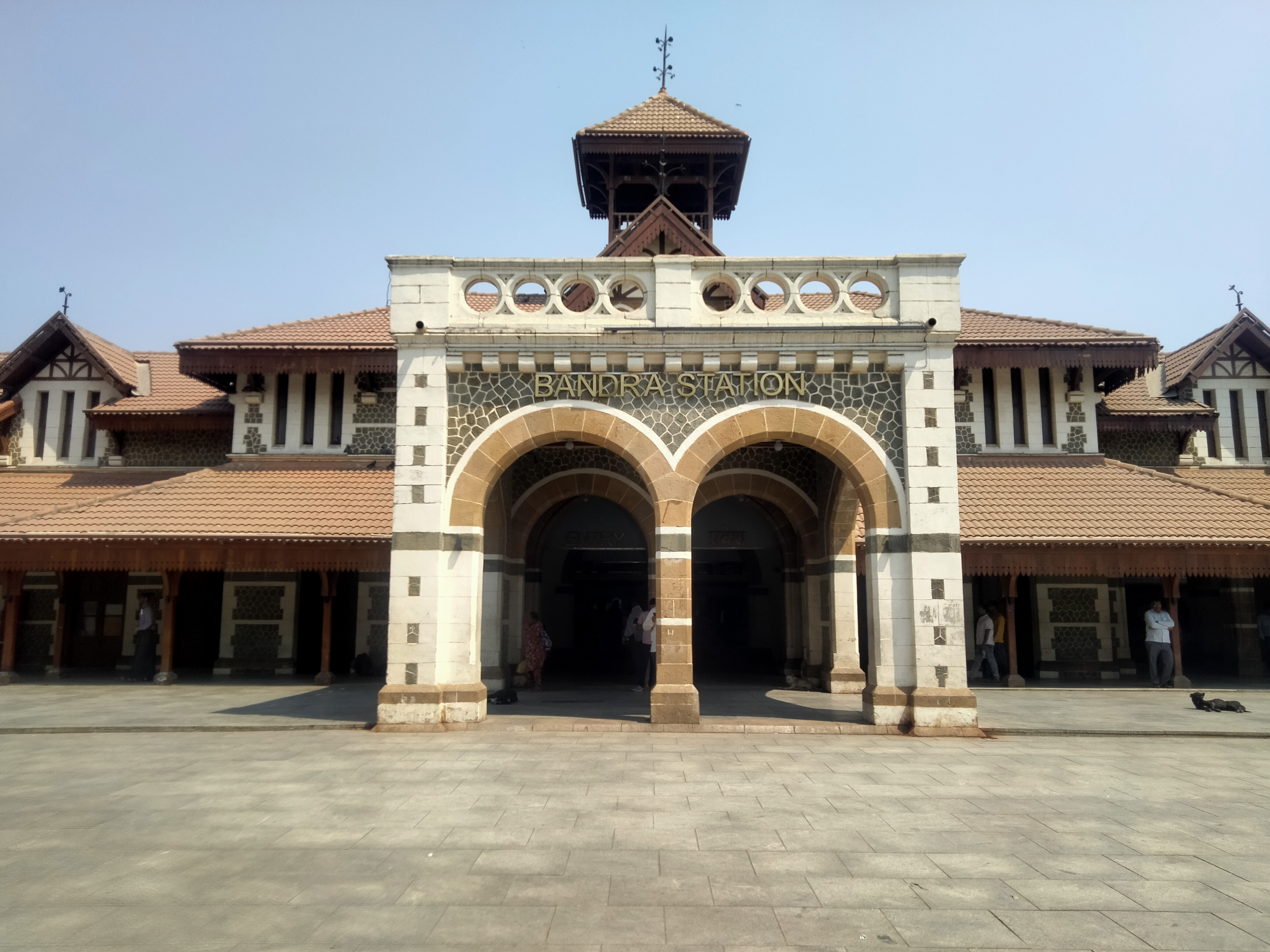
Heritage of Bandra Railway Station
