= Santacruz railway station =

Railway station in Mumbai

Santacruz
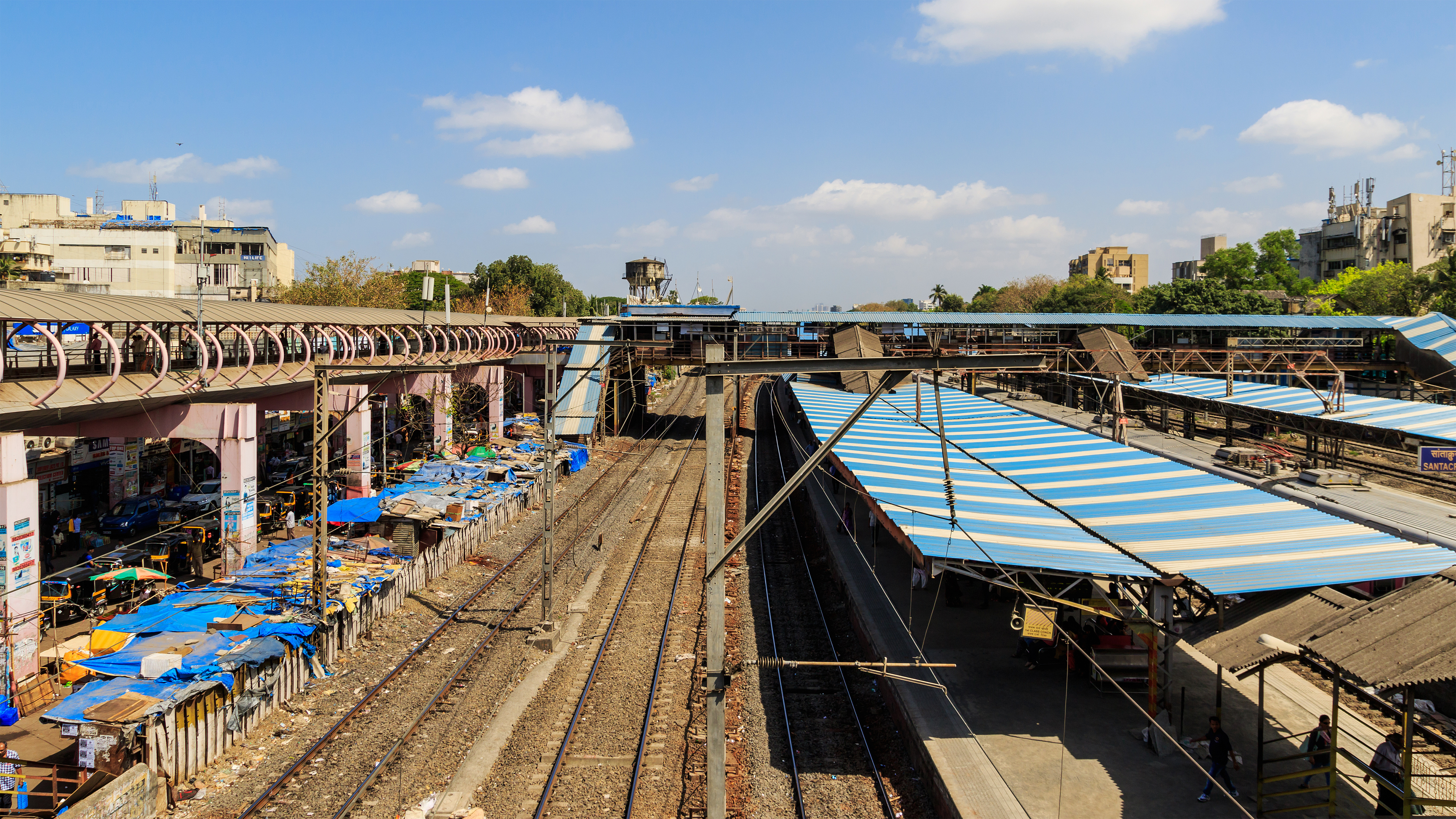

General information
- Location: Mahatma Gandhi Rd, Sen Nagar, Santacruz (West), Mumbai, Maharashtra 400055
- Coordinates: 19°04′54″N 72°50′29″E
- System: Mumbai Suburban Railway station
- Owner: Ministry of Railways, Indian Railways
- Operator: Western Railways
- Lines: Western; Harbour
- Platforms: 6
- Tracks: 8

Construction
- Structure type: At-grade
- Parking: No

Other information
- Status: Active
- Station code: STC

History
- Opened: 1888

Services
Preceding station	Mumbai Suburban Railway	Following station
Khar Road towards Churchgate	Western line	Vile Parle towards Dahanu Road
Khar Road towards Chhatrapati Shivaji Terminus	Harbour line	Vile Parle towards Goregaon
Route map
Location
- Location within Mumbai Location within Maharashtra Location within India

Santacruz railway station (station code: STC) is on the Western Line and Harbour Line of Mumbai Suburban Railway, in Maharashtra, India. The station began operations in October 1888. The neighbourhood is Santacruz.

== History ==
Although Santacruz station was formally opened in 1888, it was a stop on the first regular suburban train service of the BB&CI railway (today's Western Railway), which began on 12 April 1867, between Bombay Backbay and Viraur. Before this, during the Backbay Reclamation scheme of the 1860s, BB&CI was contracted to supply ballast. This would be brought in from Santacruz.

During a move to improve safety and efficiency along the line, power barrier gates were installed for the first time at the Santacruz level crossing in December 1952.

== Gallery ==
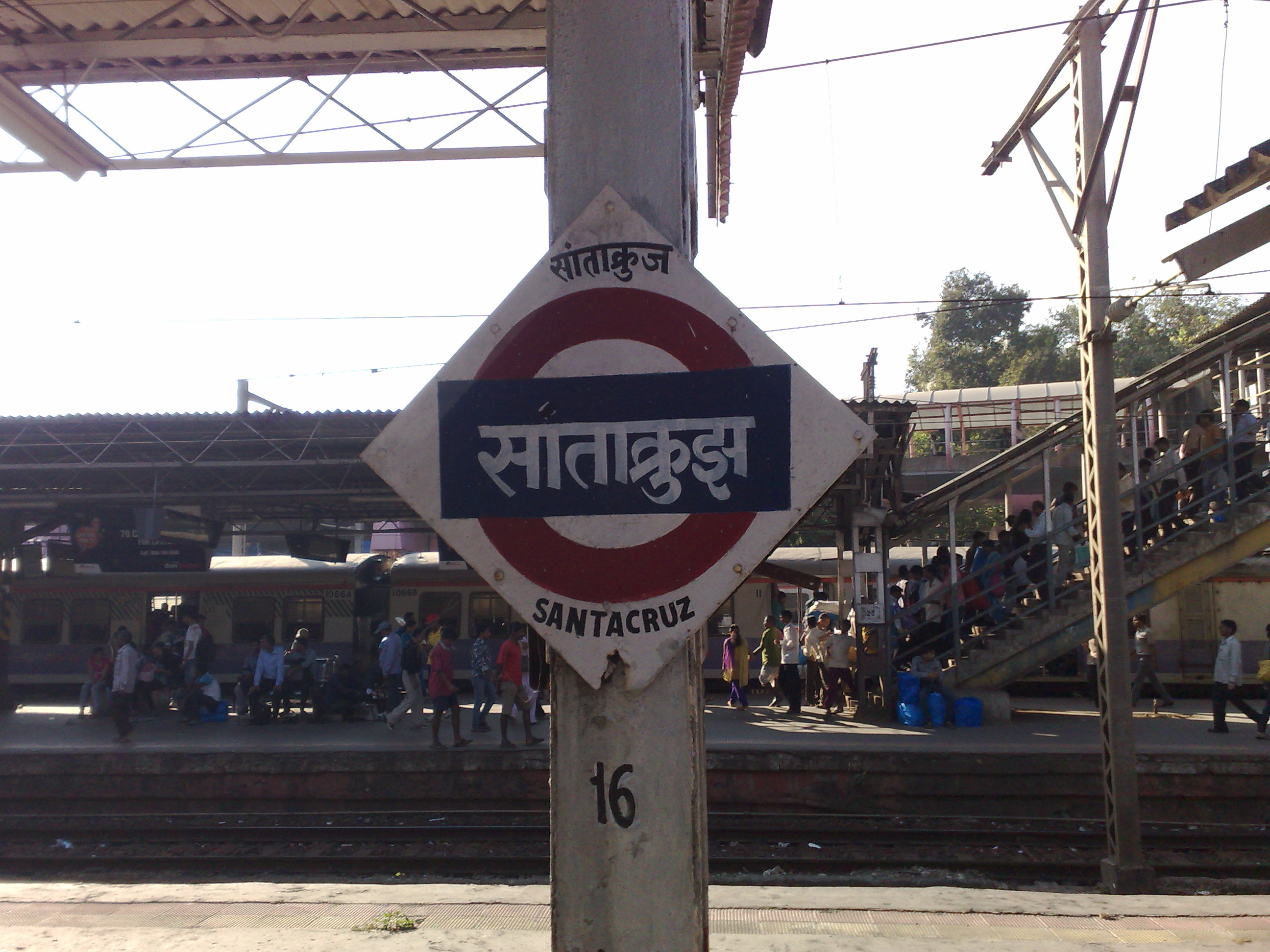
Santacruz Platform board

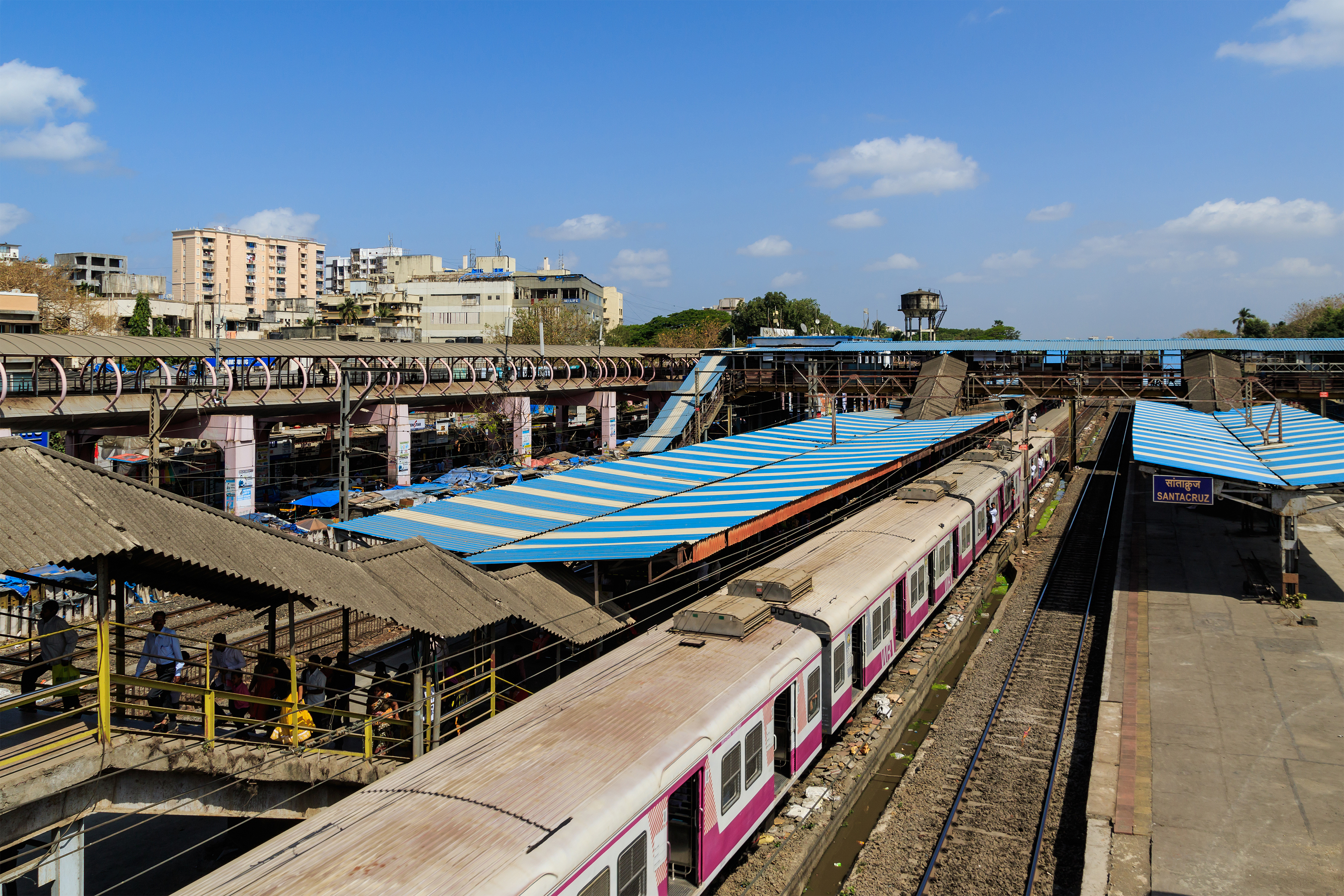
Santacruz railway station: View from FoB

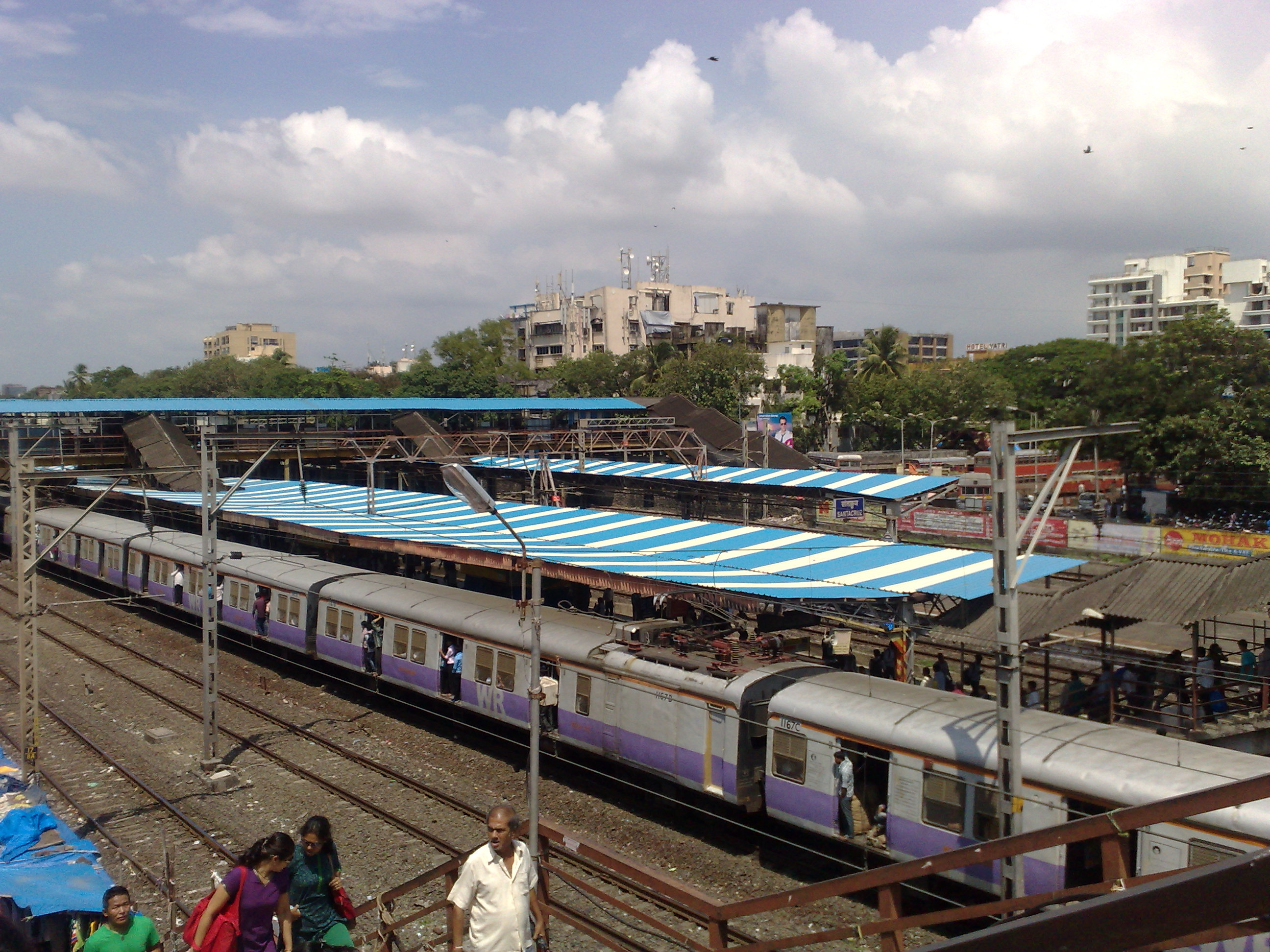
Santacruz railway station – Overview

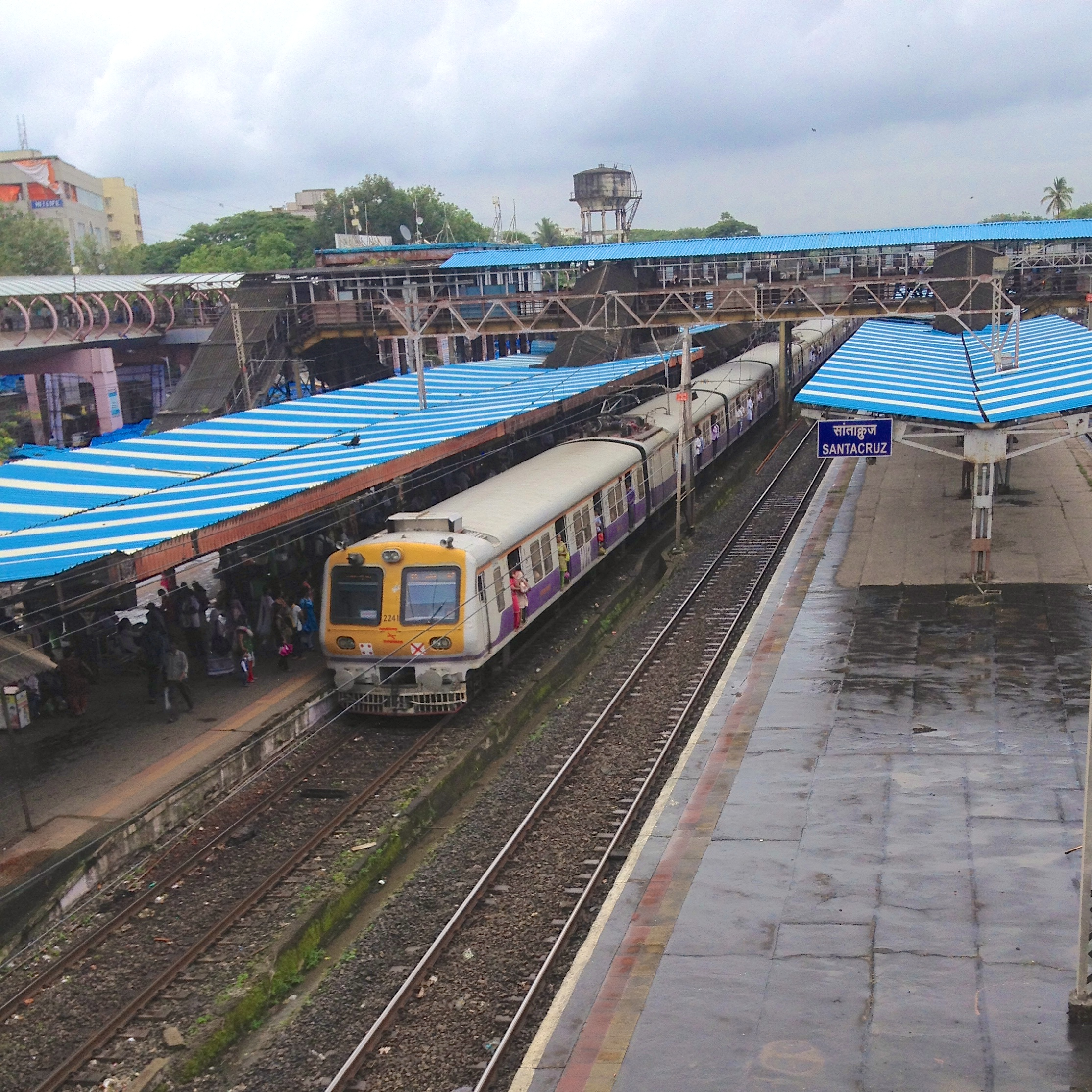
Local train at Santacruz station

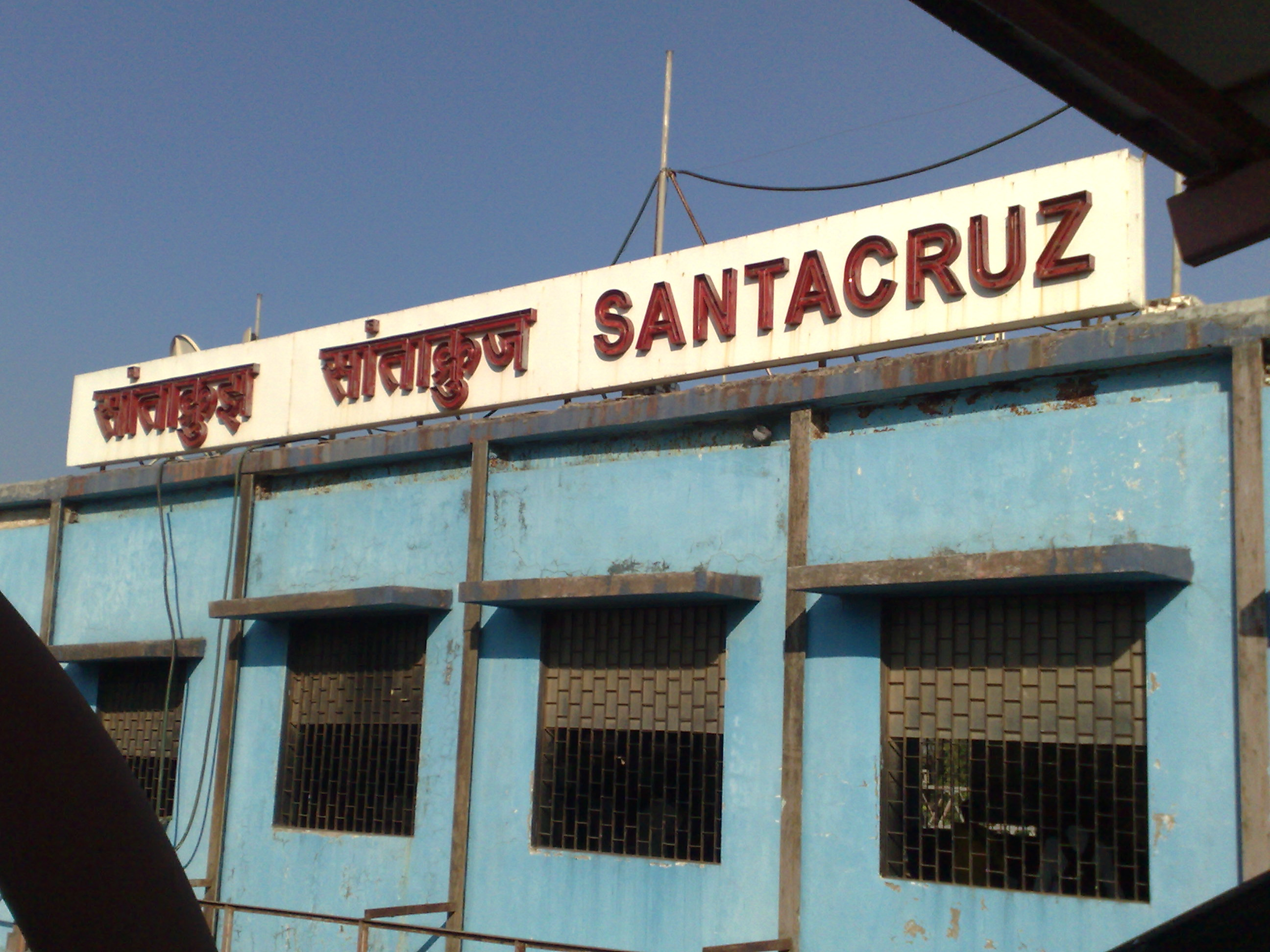
Building at Santacruz station
