= Cotton Green railway station =

Railway Station in Maharashtra, India

Cotton Green

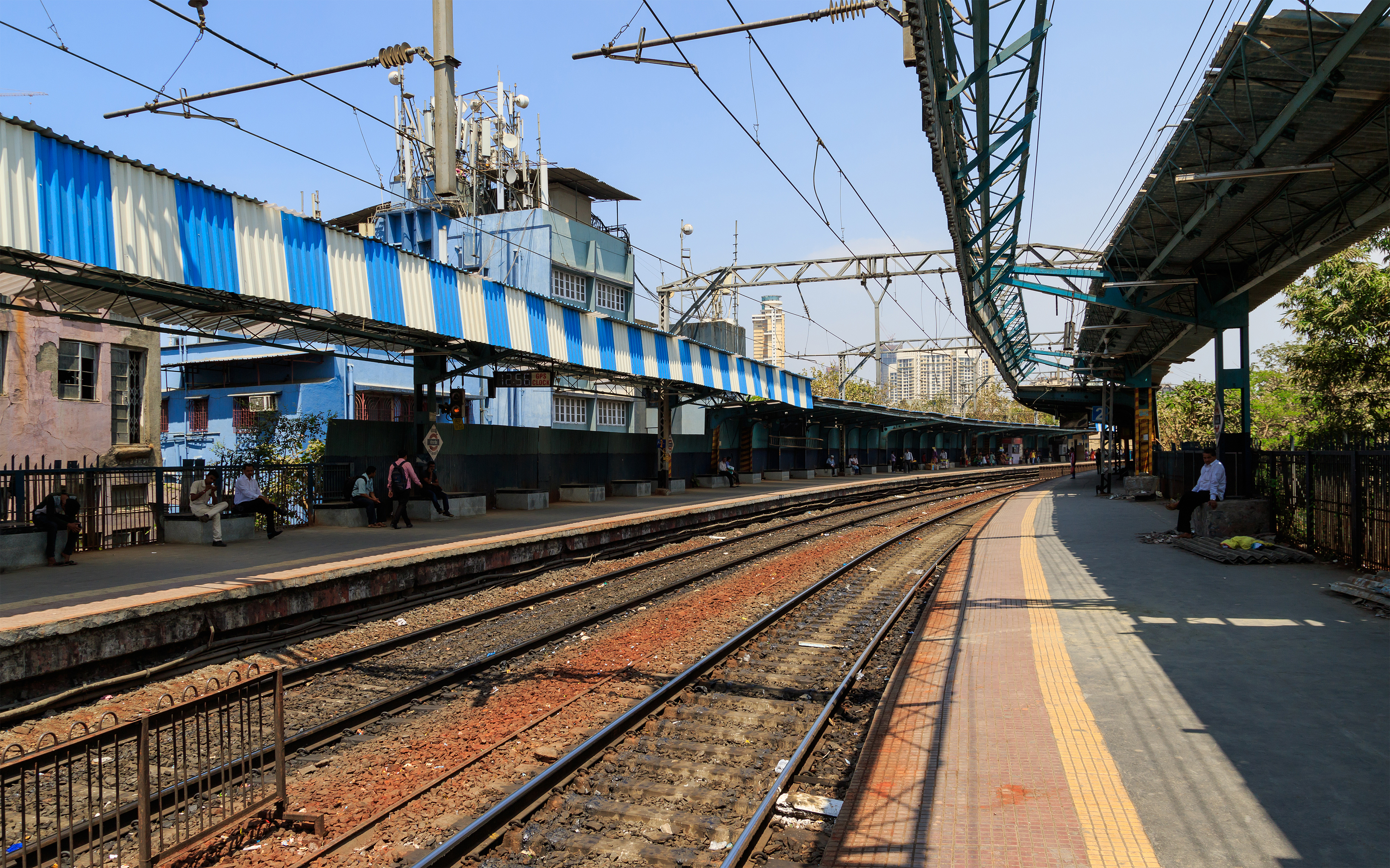
- Platforms of Cotton Green Railway Station

General information
- Coordinates: 18.986209°N 72.844076°E
- System: Mumbai Suburban Railway station
- Owner: Ministry of Railways, Indian Railways
- Line: Harbour Line
- Platforms: 2
- Tracks: 2

Construction
- Structure type: Elevated

Other information
- Status: Active
- Station code: CTGN
- Fare zone: Central Railways

Services
Preceding station	Mumbai Suburban Railway	Following station
Reay Road towards Chhatrapati Shivaji Terminus	Harbour line	Sewri towards Goregaon or Panvel
Route map
Location
- Location within Mumbai

Cotton Green (station code: CTGN) is a railway station on the Harbour Line of the Mumbai Suburban Railway. The track passes under a road connecting both sides of the station platform.

The railway station caters to Kalachowki, Ferbandar and Ghodapdeo.

== Gallery ==
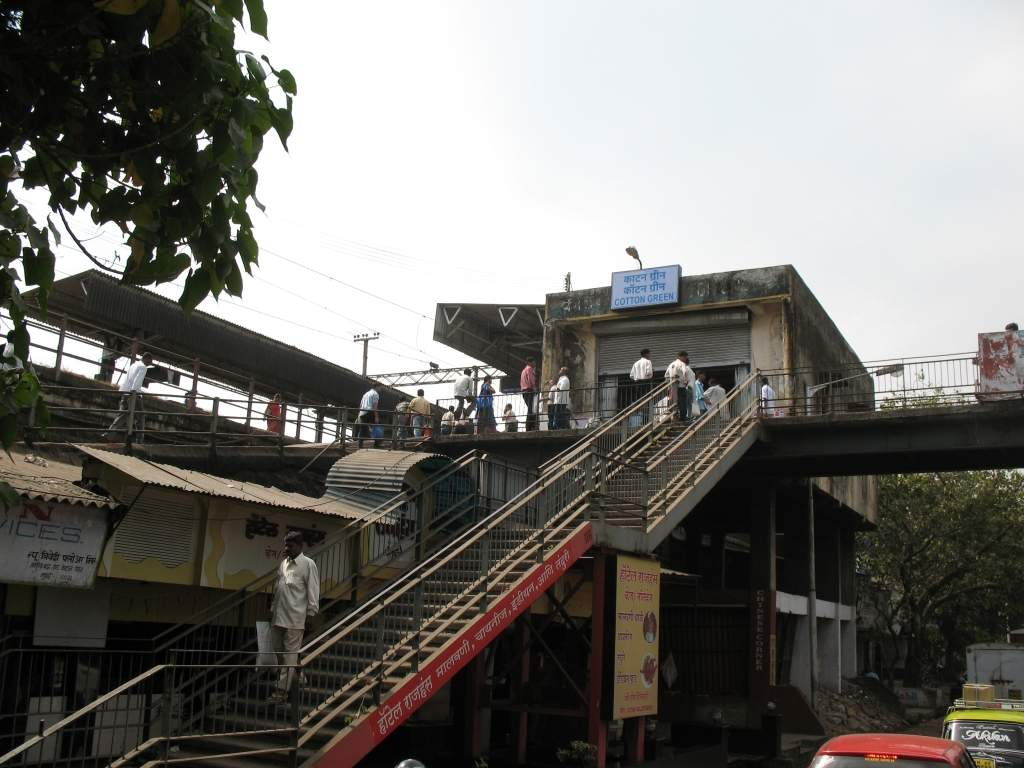
Entrance into the station

Cotton Green station board
