= Harbour line (Mumbai Suburban Railway) =

Railway line in Mumbai, India

Harbour line

Overview
- Owner: Indian Railways
- Locale: Mumbai, Navi Mumbai, Maharashtra
- Termini: Chhatrapati Shivaji Maharaj Terminus; Goregaon, Panvel
- Stations: 35

Service
- System: Mumbai Suburban Railway
- Services: List: CSMT–Panvel Goregaon–Panvel CSMT–Goregaon
- Operator: Central Railway (CR)
- Depot(s): Kurla, Sanpada, Kalwa
- Rolling stock: Siemens
- Daily ridership: 1 million

History
- Opened: 12 December 1910; 115 years ago

Technical
- Line length: 73.84 km (45.88 mi)
- Character: At grade and elevated
- Track gauge: 5 ft 6 in (1,676 mm) broad gauge
- Electrification: Yes

The Harbour Line is a branch line of the Mumbai Suburban Railway operated by Central Railway. It was named so because it catered to the eastern neighbourhoods along the city's natural harbour. Its termini are Chhatrapati Shivaji Maharaj Terminus (CSMT), Goregaon and Panvel on the CSMT-Goregaon, CSMT-Panvel and Panvel-Goregaon routes.

The line is a double line and does not have any fast trains on it. The line runs parallel to the Central line till just before Sandhurst Road where the line turns eastward and runs elevated up till Sewri. At Wadala Road, the line branches into two. The first line goes towards King's Circle and then joins with the Western line at Mahim where it runs parallel with the Western Line on the right side. It then switches sides via an elevated bridge between Bandra and Khar Road where it runs on the left side and finally terminates at Goregaon. The second line follows through Mankhurd into the city of Navi Mumbai, where it again branches out into two lines, one going to Thane (Trans-Harbour line) and the other to Panvel. The first stop outside Mumbai is the township of Vashi.

The stations in Navi Mumbai are designed by CIDCO. There are corporate offices above some of the stations. The rail bridge connecting Vashi and Mankhurd railway stations running over Thane creek, parallel to the road bridge has connected Navi Mumbai to Mumbai by rail.

About 608 services run daily on the Harbour Line. Approximately 172 of those run on the CSMT-Goregaon route. Total of 41 Rakes ply on this line.

== History ==
The first section of the Harbour line, between Kurla and Reay Road, opened on 12 December 1910. In 1925, the line was connected to the then Victoria Terminus via an elevated rail corridor between Dockyard Road and Sandhurst Road. Suburban services to Mankhurd began in 1951.

Later, the line was extended from Mankhurd to serve most of Navi Mumbai through the suburban rail network via the Mankhurd–Belapur–Panvel rail corridor was commissioned in phases in the 1990s. The line was extended to Vashi, with the inaugural suburban service being flagged off by President Ramaswamy Venkataraman on 9 May 1992. The Harbour line was further extended to Nerul in February 1993, Belapur in June 1993 and Panvel in June 1998. The corridor was converted to a double line in April 2000.

In 2004, the Trans-Harbour line was opened to the public. The line directly connected Vashi to Thane. This proved to be a boon for commuters of the two stations, who, until then, had to take a circuitous route via Mumbai city and had to change trains at Kurla.

The last direct current (DC) suburban local train ran on the Harbour line on 10 April 2016. The special train left Kurla at 11:30 pm and reached CSMT at 12:15 am. The iconic yellow-and-maroon DC local trains had their first service on 3 February 1925, when the first electric local ran between CSMT and Kurla ran on the Harbour line. The tickets for the last service were priced at ₹10,000 (US$100), with the proceeds to be donated to drought-affected regions of Maharashtra. The Indian Express reported that not a single ticket was sold. After the last DC service ran, Central Railway officially announced the completion of DC to AC conversion on the Harbour line.

On 4 September 2016, the last 9 car train was put into a sunset as all the trains were converted to 12 coach, which increases the carrying capacity of the line by 33%. Harbor line services were extended up to Goregaon on 29 March 2018. Work is underway to extend the line up to Borivali. Work is expected to be complete by 2028, and Western Railway has cleared out enroachments for this project.

== Stations ==
(All Harbour line services are slow, which means they halt at all passing by stations.)

Harbour Main Line (CSMT–Wadala Road)
#	Station Name	Marathi	Station Code	Connections
1	Chhatrapati Shivaji Maharaj Terminus	छत्रपती शिवाजी महाराज टर्मिनस	ST/CSMT	Central; Aqua Line
2	Masjid	मशीद	MSD	Central
3	Sandhurst Road	सॅंडहर्स्ट रोड	SNRD	Central
4	Dockyard Road	डॉकयार्ड रोड	DKRD	None
5	Reay Road	रे रोड	RRD	None
6	Cotton Green	कॉटन ग्रीन	CTGN	None
7	Sewri	शिवडी	SVE	None
8	Wadala Road	वडाळा रोड	VD/VDLR	To Goregaon or Panvel, Wadala Bridge

At Wadala Road, the Harbour line splits into two corridors, one going to Panvel and the other to Goregaon. The exact split occurs 800 metres north of Wadala Road station, at a location known as Ravli (variously spelled as Raoli, Ravali or Rawli) corresponding to the nearby Ravli slum. There is no railway station at Ravli Junction. However, due to the critical Ravli Junction Yard signal box, there are various public references to this name in news articles and other sources.

=== Towards Panvel ===
Harbour Navi Mumbai Branch Line (Wadala Road–Panvel)
#	Station Name	Marathi	Station Code	Connections
8	Wadala Road	वडाळा रोड	VD/VDLR	To Goregaon; Wadala Bridge
9	Guru Tegh Bahadur Nagar	गुरु तेग बहादुर नगर	GTBN	Guru Tegh Bahadur Nagar
10	Chunabhatti	चुनाभट्टी	CHF	None
11	Kurla	कुर्ला	C/CLA	Central
12	Tilak Nagar	टिळक नगर	TKNG	Lokmanya Tilak Terminus
13	Chembur	चेंबूर	CM/CMBR	Chembur
14	Govandi	गोवंडी	GV	None
15	Mankhurd	मानखुर्द	MK/MNKD	2B-Yellow LineGold Line
16	Vashi	वाशी	VA/VSH	Trans-Harbour
17	Sanpada	सानपाडा	SNCR	Trans-Harbour
18	Juinagar	जुईनगर	JNJ	Trans-Harbour
19	Nerul	नेरूळ	NU/NEU	Trans-Harbour; Port
20	Seawoods-Darave-Karave	सीवूड्स-दारावे-करावे	SWDK	Trans-Harbour; Port
21	CBD Belapur	सीबीडी बेलापूर	BR/BEPR	CBD Belapur; Trans-Harbour; Port
22	Kharghar	खारघर	KHAG	Kharghar; Trans-Harbour
23	Mansarovar	मानसरोवर	MANR	Trans-Harbour
24	Khandeshwar	खांदेश्वर	KNDS	Khandeshwar; Trans-Harbour
25	Panvel	पनवेल	PL/PNVL	Trans-Harbour; Vasai Road–Roha

=== Towards Goregaon ===
Harbour Salsette Branch Line (Wadala Road–Bandra–Goregaon)
#	Station Name	Marathi	Station Code	Connections
8	Wadala Road	वडाळा रोड	VD/VDLR	To Panvel; Wadala Bridge
9	King's Circle	किंग्ज सर्कल	KCE	None
10	Mahim Junction	माहिम जंक्शन	MM	Western
11	Bandra	वांद्रे	B/BA	Western; 2B-Yellow Line
12	Khar Road	खार रोड	KHAR	Western
13	Santacruz	सांताक्रुझ	STC	Western
14	Vile Parle	विलेपार्ले	VLP	Western
15	Andheri	अंधेरी	AD/ADH	Western Blue Line
16	Jogeshwari	जोगेश्वरी	JOS	Western
17	Ram Mandir	राम मंदिर	RMAR	Western
18	Goregaon	गोरेगाव	GO/GMN	Western
19	Malad	मालाड	M/MDD	Western (Under construction)
20	Kandivli	कांदिवली	KILE	Western (Under construction)
21	Borivali	बोरीवली	BO/BVI	Western (Under construction)

== Future development ==
=== Kurla–Shivaji Nagar service ===
CR has sought permission from the Railway Board to run EMUs on the Harbour line between Kurla and Shivaji Nagar in Pune. The service would provide direct connectivity between Navi Mumbai and Pune, which is currently not available. EMUs will be modified to include six motor cars.

CR plans to use 16 coach mail/express trains to cover the 170 km distance in approximately 2 hours and 50 minutes. Stations on the line will be Kurla, Vashi, Nerul, CBD Belapur, Panvel, Karjat, Lonavala and Shivaji Nagar. Work on extending Harbour Line branch from Goregaon to Borivali is underway since March 2024.

== AC Local ==
Services	Days	Started from	Ref.
14	Mon-Sat	26 January 2026	
14	Mon-Sat	1 May 2026	
28	Total		

Up services
Train No.	Departure	Origin	Arrival	Destination
98506	4:15	Vashi	4:46	Wadala Road
98020	6:17	Panvel	7:36	CSMT
98520	6:23	Vashi	7:13	CSMT
98052	8:45	Panvel	10:06	CSMT
98058	9:09	Panvel	10:30	CSMT
98092	11:43	Panvel	13:02	CSMT
98096	12:03	Panvel	13:04	Wadala Road
98356	14:28	Belapur	15:32	CSMT
98128	14:31	Panvel	15:50	CSMT
98558	16:55	Vashi	17:26	Wadala Road
98166	17:07	Panvel	18:26	CSMT
98184	18:37	Panvel	19:56	CSMT
98204	20:07	Panvel	21:26	CSMT
98242	22:58	Panvel	0:17	CSMT

Down services
Train No.	Departure	Origin	Arrival	Destination
98009	5:06	Wadala Road	6:08	Panvel
98045	7:17	CSMT	8:37	Panvel
98051	7:40	CSMT	9:00	Panvel
98083	10:10	CSMT	11:30	Panvel
98089	10:34	CSMT	11:54	Panvel
98339	13:07	CSMT	14:13	Belapur
98119	13:17	Wadala Road	14:20	Panvel
98157	15:36	CSMT	16:56	Panvel
98533	15:54	CSMT	16:43	Vashi
98181	17:30	Wadala Road	18:32	Panvel
98201	18:33	CSMT	19:54	Panvel
98221	20:00	CSMT	21:21	Panvel
98239	21:30	CSMT	22:50	Panvel
98003	0:24	CSMT	1:13	Vashi

== Goregaon-Panvel Local ==
Up services
Train No.	Departure	Origin	Arrival	Destination
98901	5:57	Panvel	7:39	Goregaon
98903	6:53	Panvel	8:43	Goregaon
98905	7:39	Panvel	9:22	Goregaon
98907	10:37	Panvel	12:19	Goregaon
98909	16:34	Panvel	18:18	Goregaon
98911	17:01	Panvel	18:45	Goregaon
98913	17:29	Panvel	19:14	Goregaon
98915	18:33	Panvel	20:16	Goregaon
98917	19:35	Panvel	21:20	Goregaon

Down services
Train No.	Departure	Origin	Arrival	Destination
98902	7:30	Goregaon	9:12	Panvel
98904	8:39	Goregaon	10:22	Panvel
98906	9:30	Goregaon	11:16	Panvel
98908	12:14	Goregaon	14:04	Panvel
98910	18:27	Goregaon	20:13	Panvel
98912	18:55	Goregaon	20:46	Panvel
98914	19:40	Goregaon	21:29	Panvel
98916	20:12	Goregaon	22:05	Panvel
98918	21:28	Goregaon	23:22	Panvel

== WR Special Local ==
Up services
Train No.	Departure	Origin	Arrival	Destination
91392	11:34	Goregaon	12:28	CSMT
91394	13:38	Goregaon	14:32	CSMT
91396	19:45	Goregaon	20:39	CSMT

Down services
Train No.	Departure	Origin	Arrival	Destination
91393	12:36	CSMT	13:29	Goregaon
91395	14:40	CSMT	15:35	Goregaon
91491	20:46	CSMT	21:53	Borivali

== See also ==
- Mumbai Suburban Railway
- List of Mumbai Suburban Railway stations
- CST–Panvel fast corridor
- Central Railway zone
