= Khar Road railway station =

Railway Station in Maharashtra, India

Khar Road

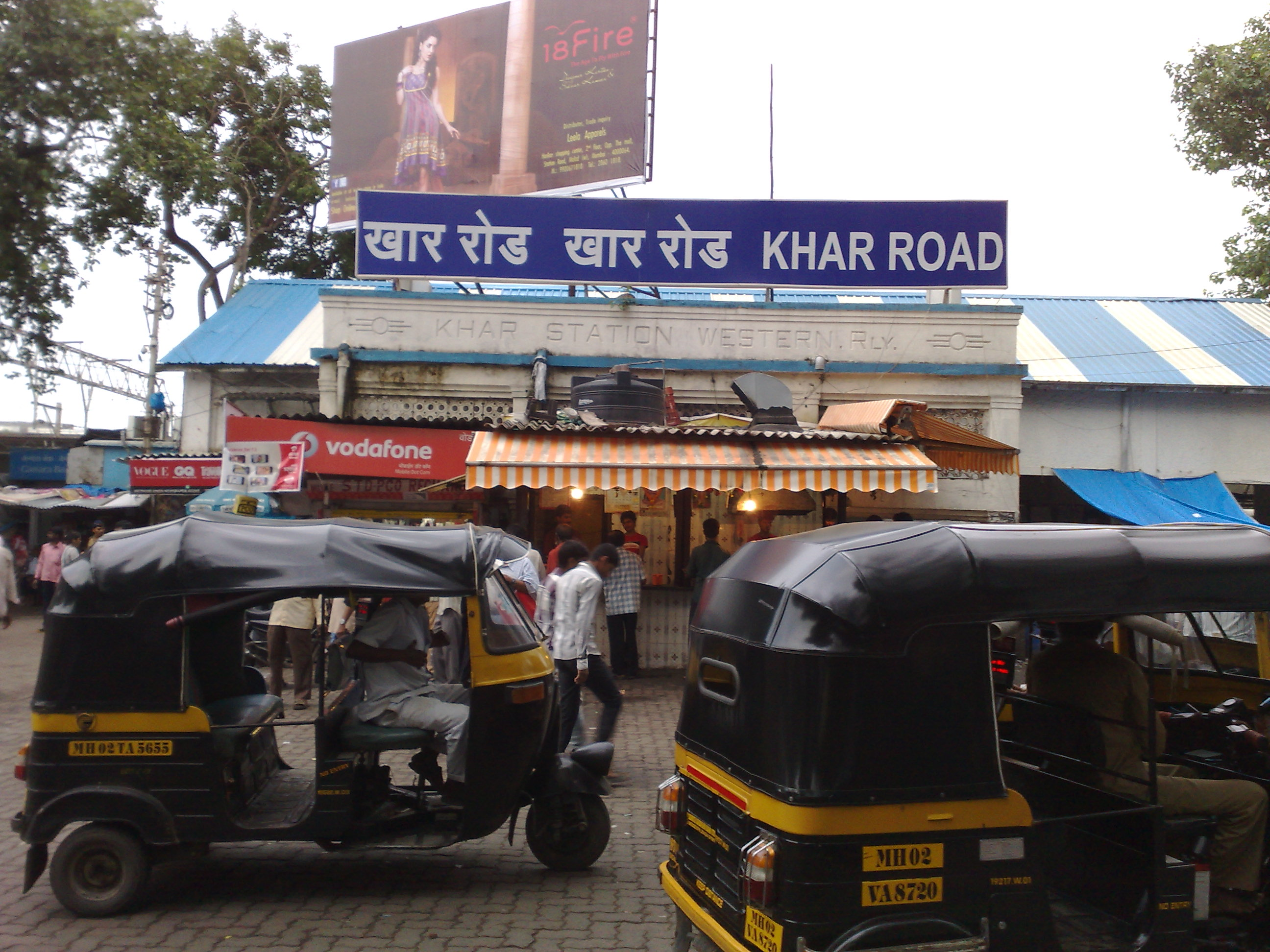

General information
- Coordinates: 19.068598°N 72.840042°E
- System: Mumbai Suburban Railway station
- Owner: Ministry of Railways, Indian Railways
- Lines: Western Line, Harbour Line
- Platforms: 6+1A(under construction)
- Tracks: 6

Construction
- Structure type: Standard on-ground station

Other information
- Status: Active
- Station code: KHAR
- Fare zone: Western Railways

History
- Opened: 1 July 1924

Passengers
- 85,000 (2014)

Services
Preceding station	Mumbai Suburban Railway	Following station
Bandra towards Churchgate	Western line	Santacruz towards Dahanu Road
Bandra towards Chhatrapati Shivaji Terminus	Harbour line	Santacruz towards Goregaon
Route map
Location
- Location within Mumbai

Khar Road ([kʰaːɾ]; station code: KHAR) is a railway station on the Western Line and the Harbour Line of the Mumbai Suburban Railway network, in the Khar suburb of Mumbai, Maharashtra.

== History ==
The station at Khar Rd was opened on 1 April 1924, to cater to the expected 1,700 passengers of the then new town planning scheme. In the 1950s, the extension of covered shed, at the extreme ends of the platform was completed. Besides, a new booking office with five ticket windows was provided for the station.

On 11 July 2006, Khar Road was affected by the Mumbai train bombings.

== Gallery ==
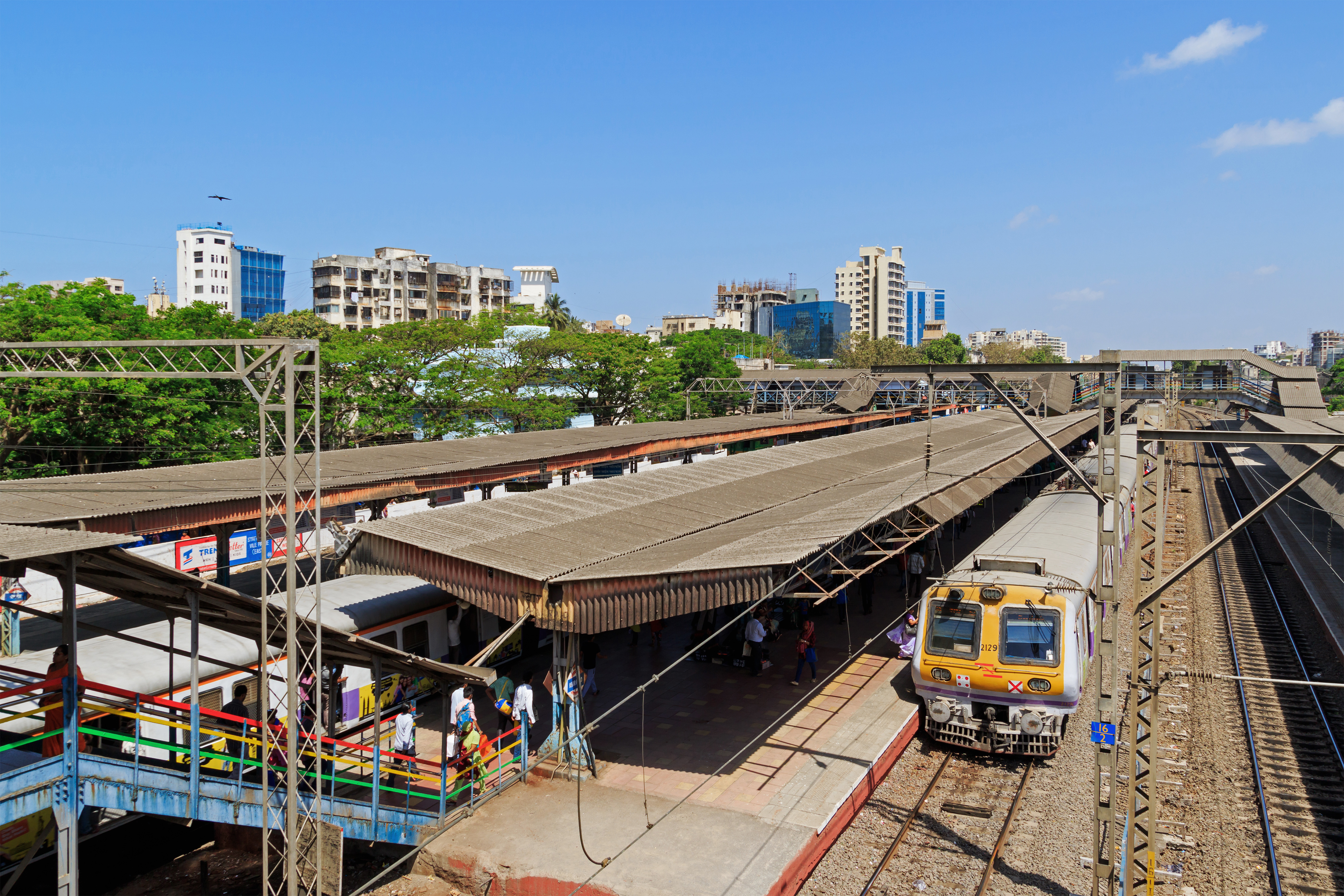
Khar Road station

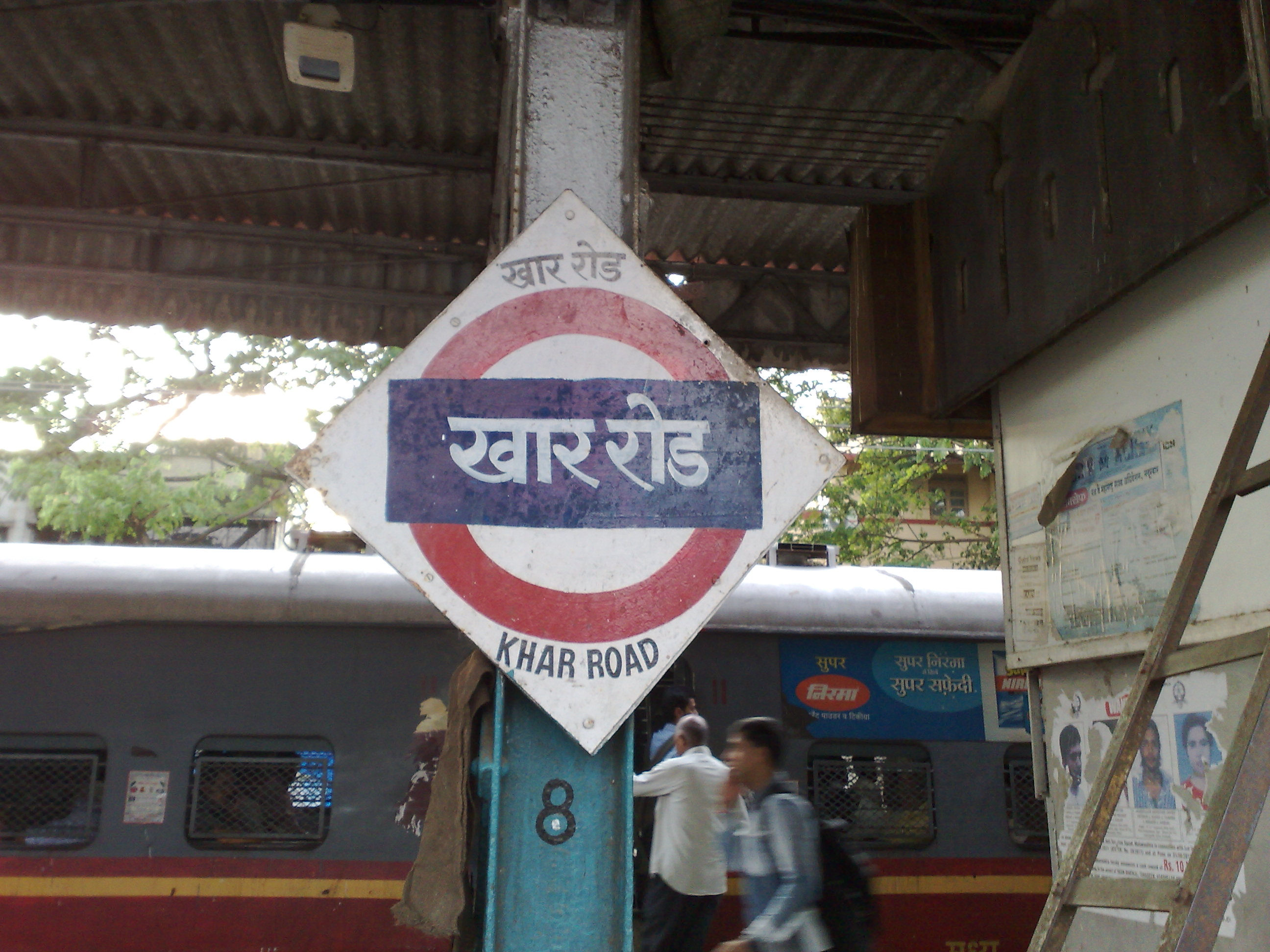
Khar Road Platform board
