= Reay Road railway station =

Railway station in Mumbai

Reay Road

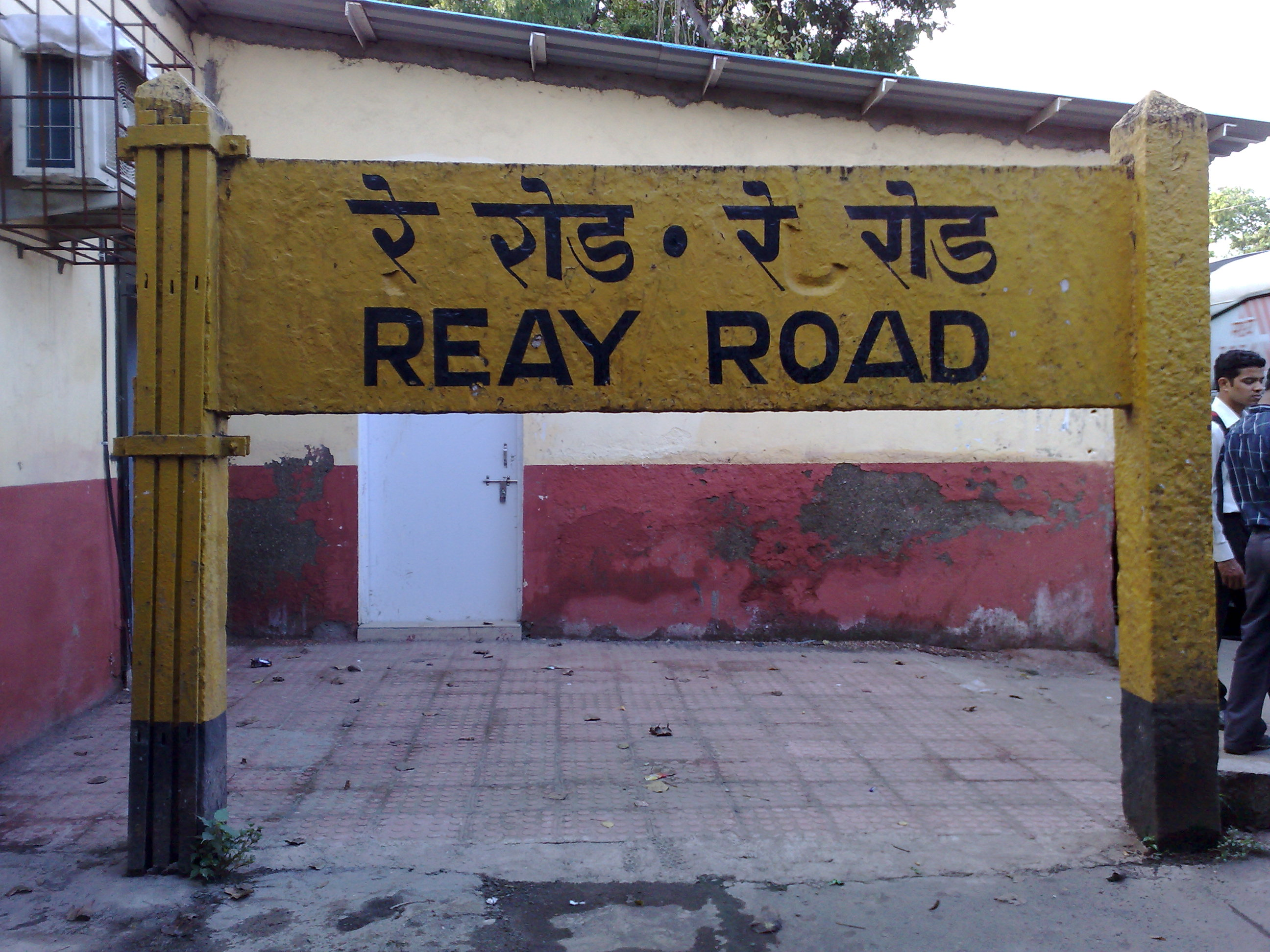

General information
- Coordinates: 18.977443°N 72.844210°E
- System: Mumbai Suburban Railway station
- Owner: Ministry of Railways, Indian Railways
- Line: Harbour Line

Construction
- Structure type: Standard on-ground station

Other information
- Status: Active
- Station code: RRD
- Fare zone: Central Railways

History
- Opened: 1910

Services
Preceding station	Mumbai Suburban Railway	Following station
Dockyard Road towards Chhatrapati Shivaji Terminus	Harbour line	Cotton Green towards Goregaon or Panvel
Route map
Location
- Location within Mumbai

Reay Road (station code: RRD) is a railway station on the Harbour Line of the Mumbai Suburban Railway. The station was named after Lord Reay, Governor of Bombay between 1885 and 1890. It was opened in 1910 and was originally used as a terminus for the Kurla - Reay Road harbour line on the Great Indian Peninsular Railway, the first railway line in India.

The station's single storey colonial building has an exposed stone masonry facade, hooded segmental arches along the front, rectangular pilasters and a lean-to roof.

The station is a Grade-I heritage structure. The other 4 railway stations on Mumbai's heritage list include Chhatrapati Shivaji Maharaj Terminus, Western Railways Headquarters Building (Churchgate), Bandra railway station and Byculla railway station.

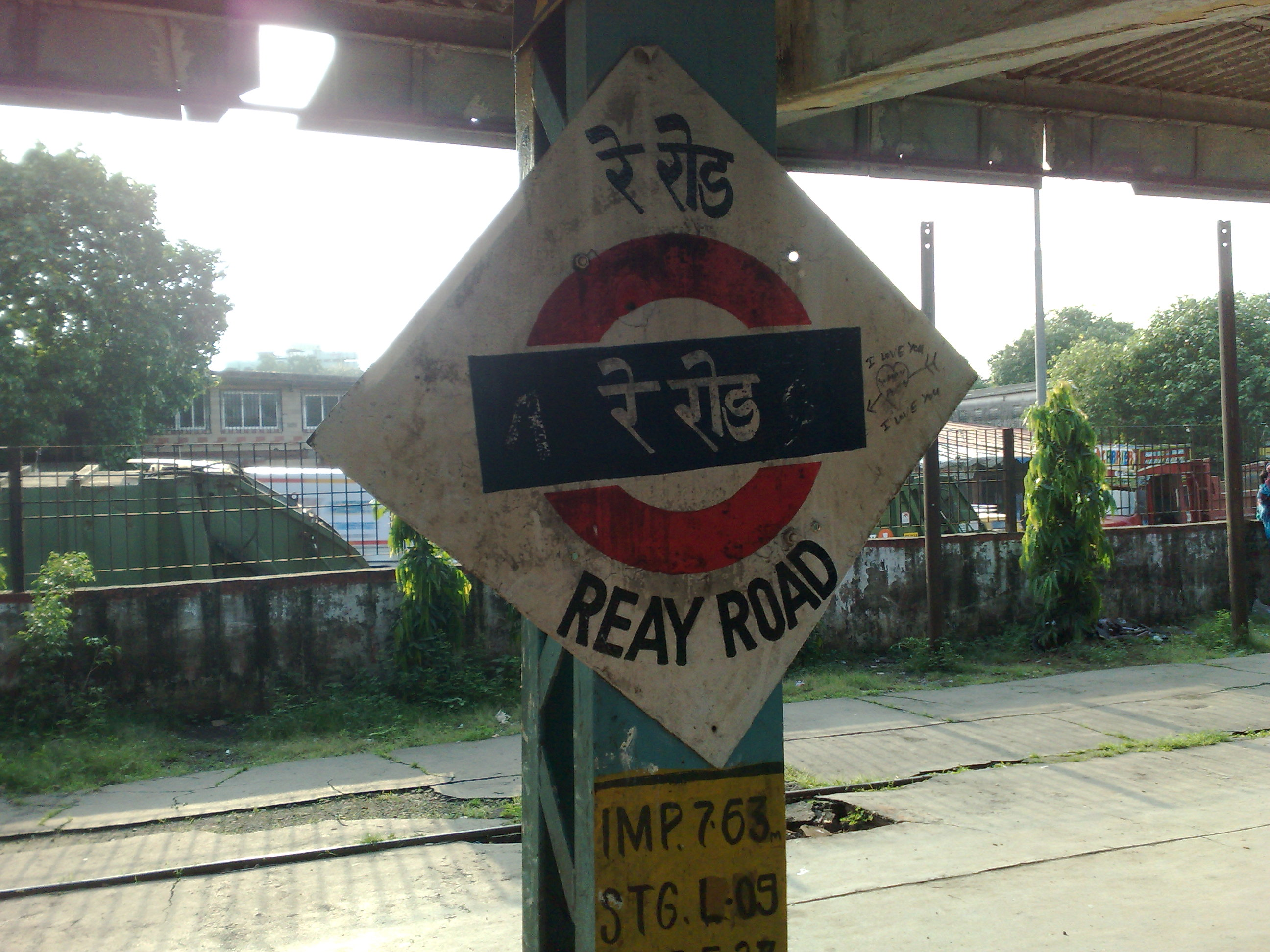
Reay Road – platform board

The letters GIPR can be seen on either side of the station. GIPR is the abbreviation for Great Indian Peninsula Railway, the first rail line in India.

The tracks have been extended for 12 car local trains. The track passes under a road connecting both sides of the station platform.

Britannia, a famous brand of baked goods has a bakery in this area. A forging mill is present next to the railway station. The station gives access for many Iron goods stockists in the area. These Stockists stock iron beams, rods, plates etc. in the nearby warehouses and trade from there. This place is also a source for traders who depend on the ship breaking industry.
