= Sewri railway station =

Railway Station in Maharashtra, India

Sewri

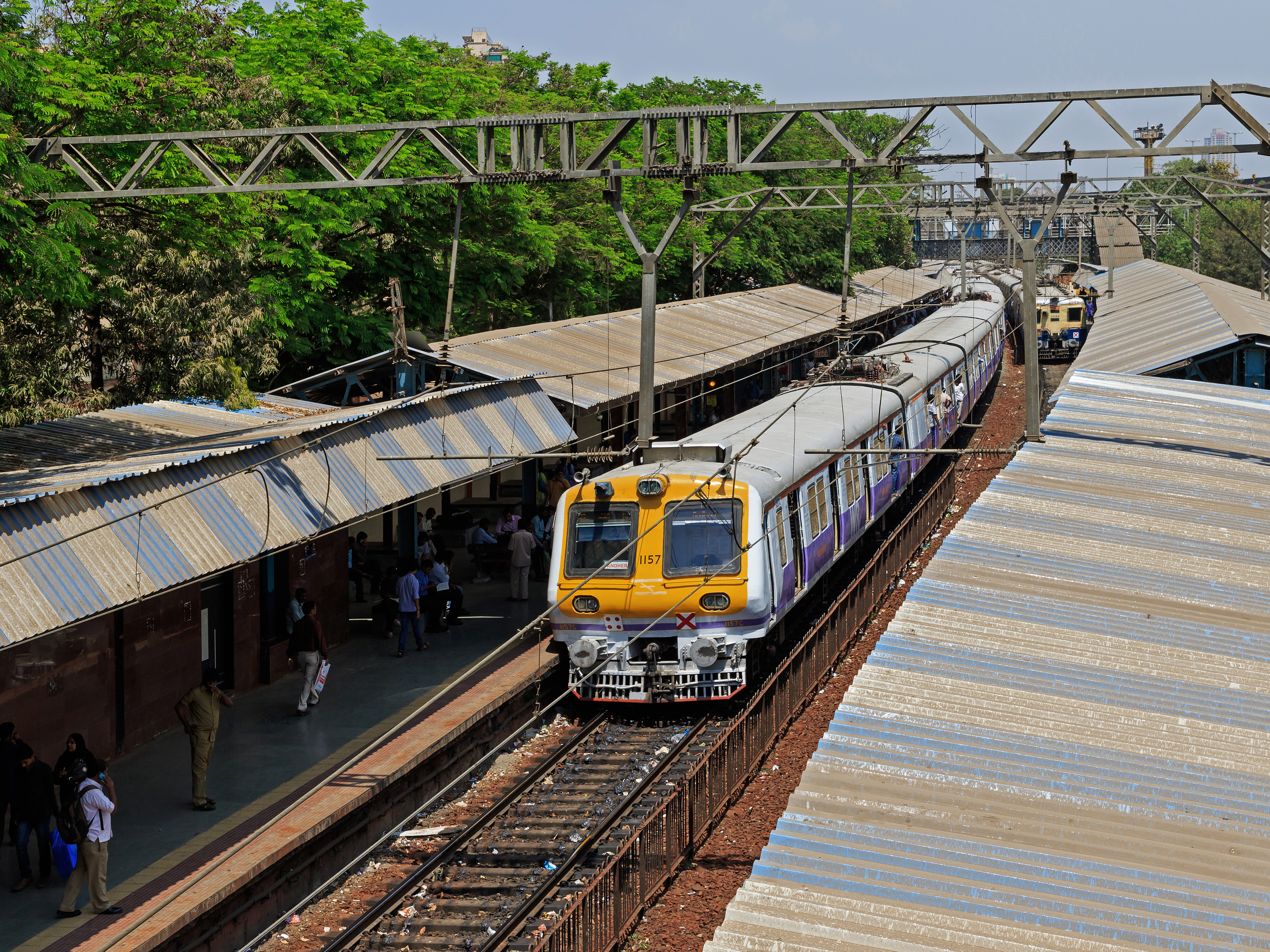

General information
- Coordinates: 18.9987°N 72.8545°E
- System: Mumbai Suburban Railway station
- Owner: Ministry of Railways, Indian Railways
- Line: Harbour line

Construction
- Structure type: Elevated

Other information
- Status: Active
- Station code: SVE
- Fare zone: Central Railways

Services
Preceding station	Mumbai Suburban Railway	Following station
Cotton Green towards Chhatrapati Shivaji Terminus	Harbour line	Wadala Road towards Goregaon or Panvel
Route map
Location
- Location within India Location within Mumbai

Sewri (formerly Sevree, station code: SVE) is a railway station on the Harbour Line of the Mumbai Suburban Railway.

== History ==
Sewri, and Sewri temporary stations were both opened on 1 February 1911. Out of these two, the Sewri station was closed, while 'Sewri Temporary' station was renamed as 'Sewri' station on 22 February 1914. Vadala station (Wadala station) was opened on the same day.

== Gallery ==
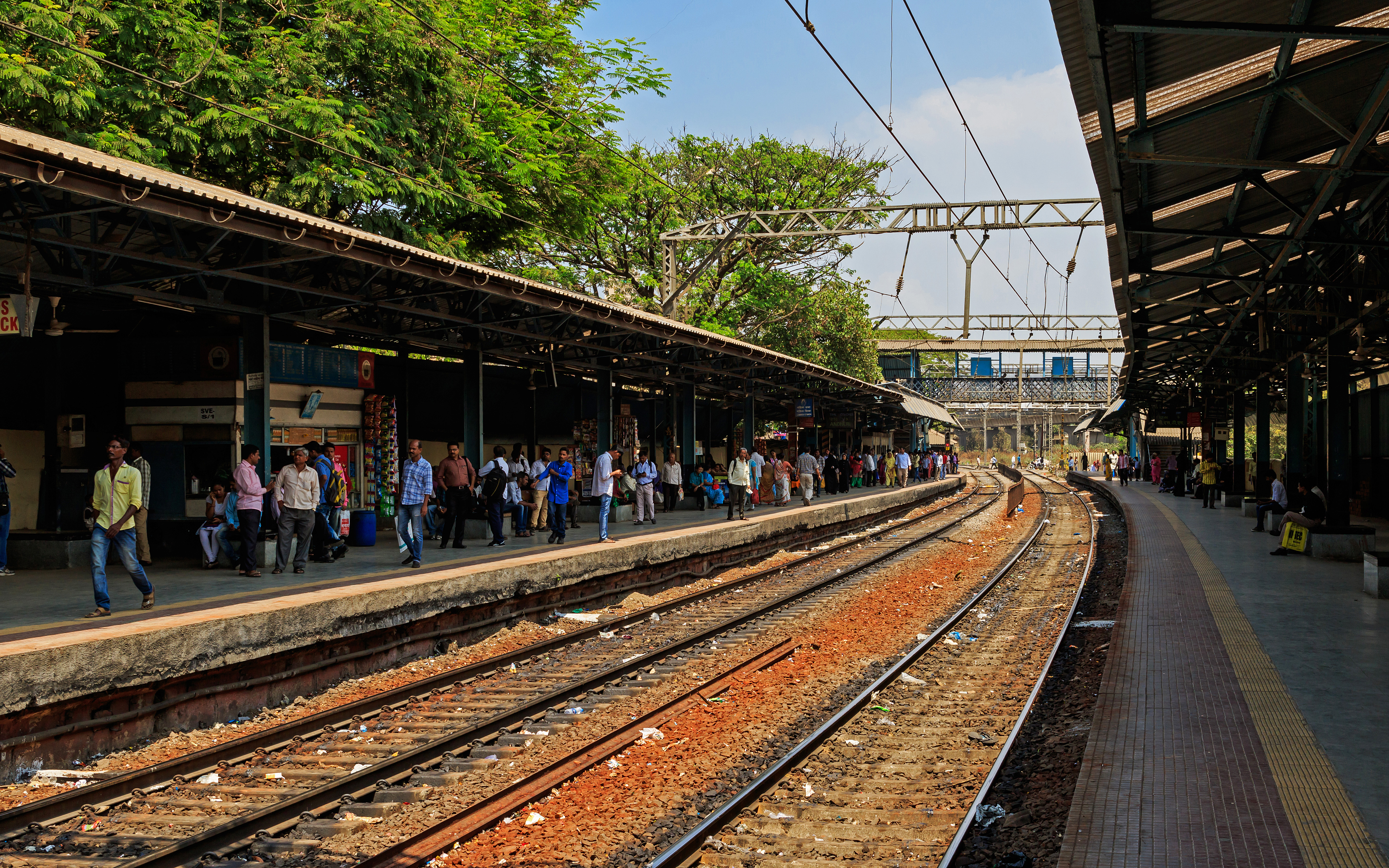
Sewri station- Platform view

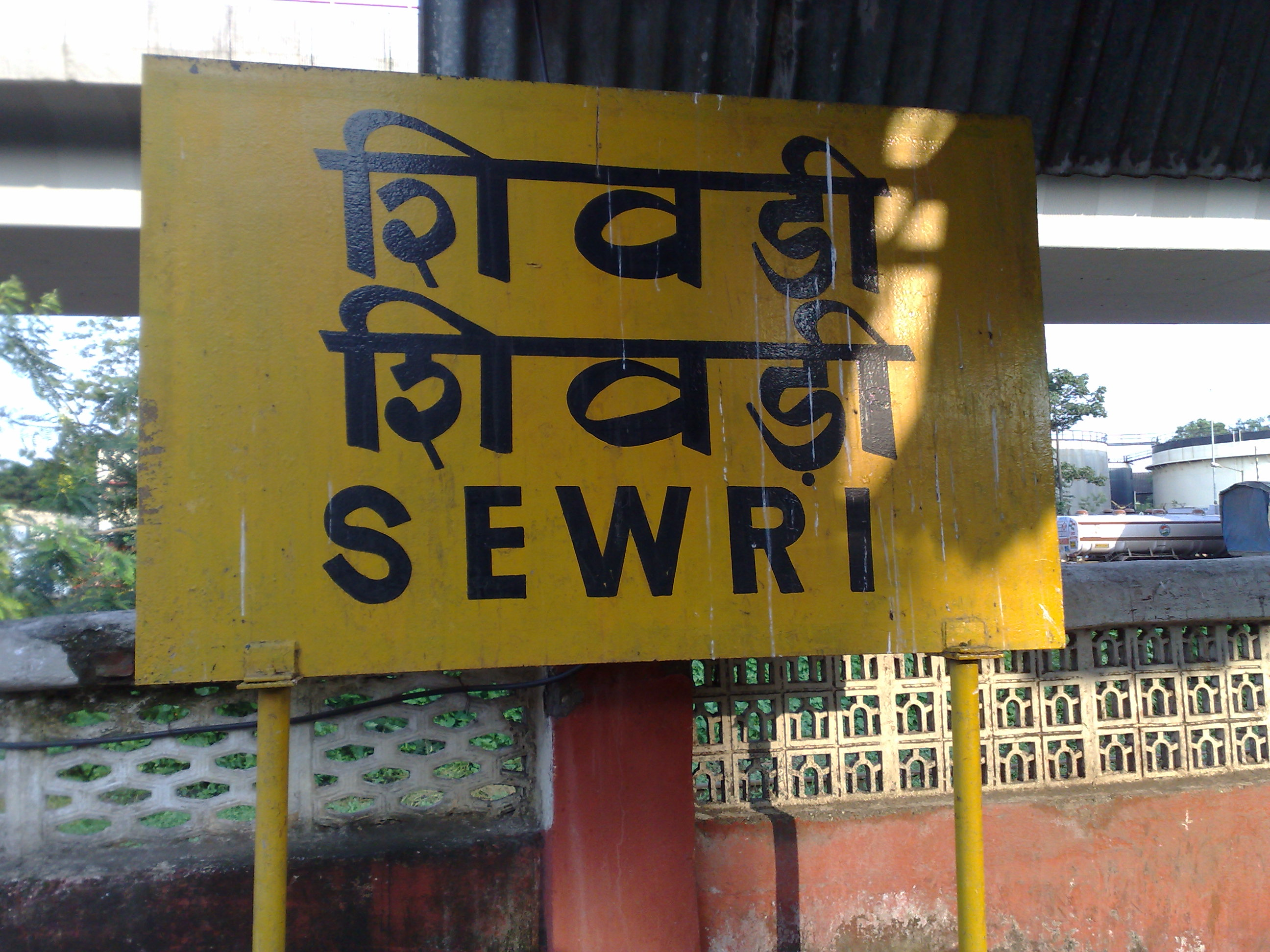
Sewri station board

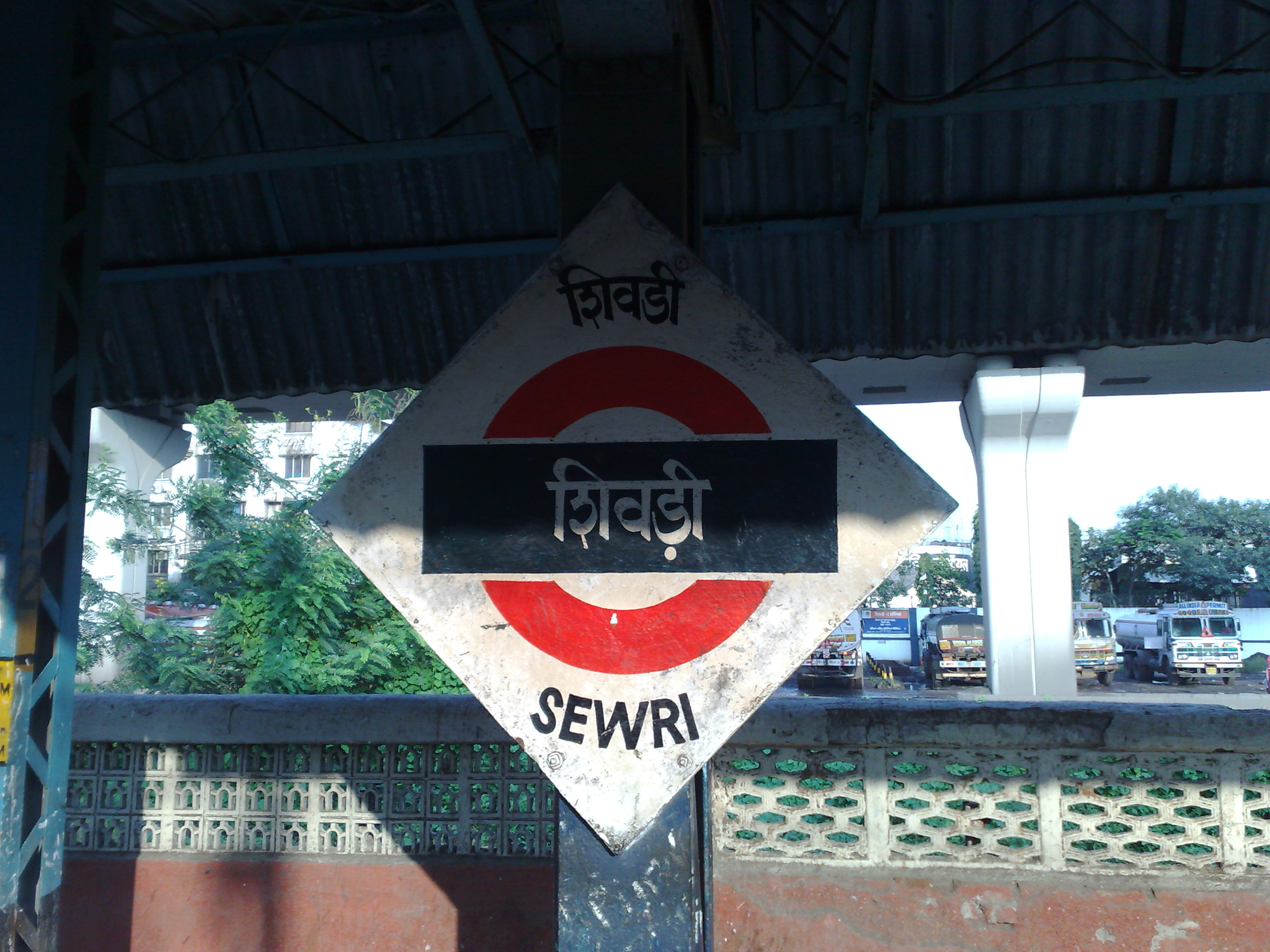
Sewri platform board
