= King's Circle railway station =

Railway Station in Maharashtra, India

King's Circle

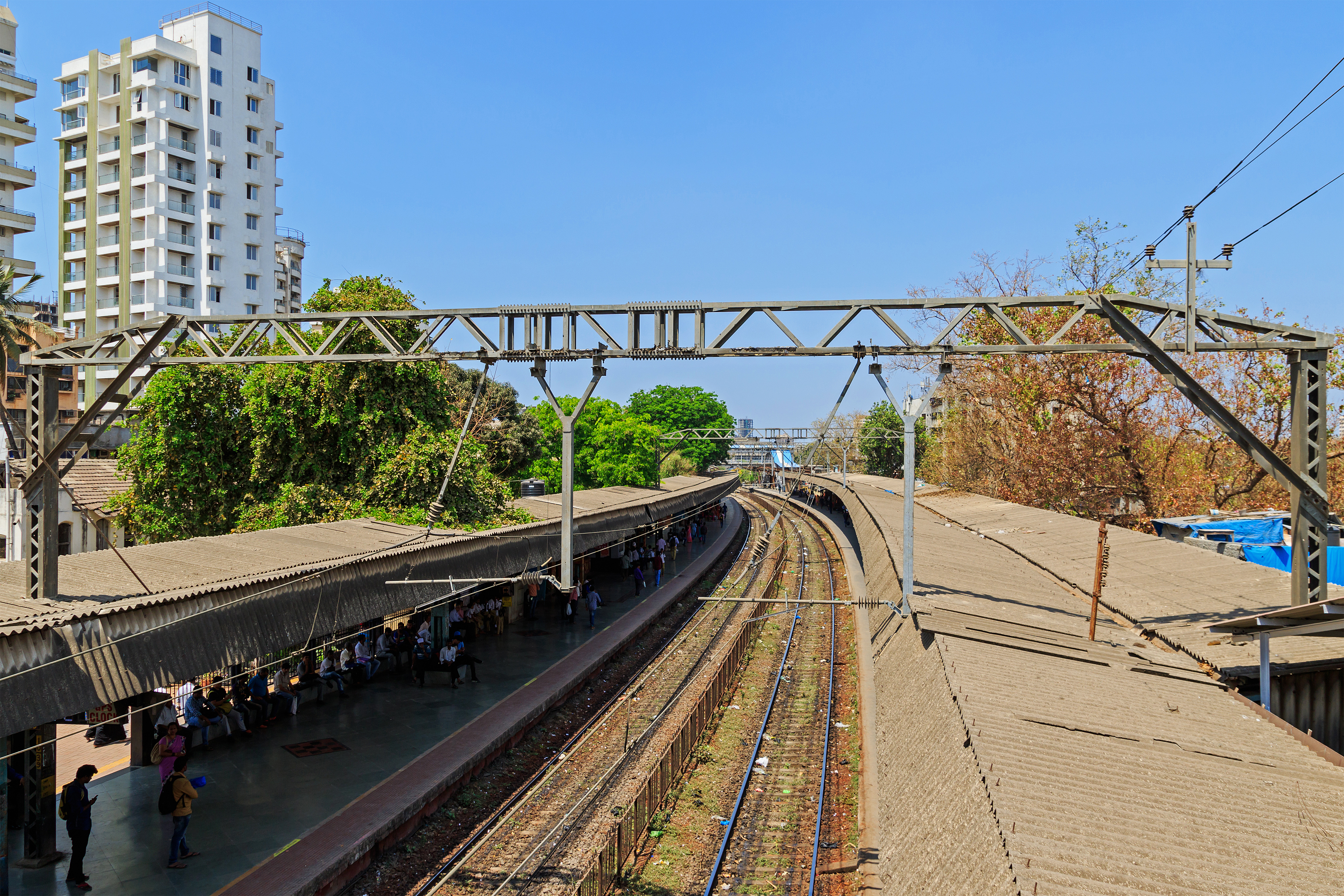

General information
- Location: Matunga
- Coordinates: 19.026734°N 72.855341°E
- System: Mumbai Suburban Railway station
- Owner: Ministry of Railways, Indian Railways
- Line: Harbour line

Construction
- Structure type: Elevated station

Other information
- Status: Active
- Station code: KCE
- Fare zone: Central Railways

Services
Preceding station	Mumbai Suburban Railway	Following station
Wadala Road towards Chhatrapati Shivaji Terminus	Harbour line	Mahim Junction towards Goregaon
Route map
Harbour line
Location
- Location within India Location within Maharashtra Location within Mumbai

King's Circle (station code: KCE) is a railway station on the Harbour line of the Mumbai Suburban Railway network. King's Circle and Matunga stations are next to each other albeit the latter is on the Central line. It is named after the King's Circle Park, which was named after George V, the King-Emperor. The trains passing through King's Circle station are only the ones going to Bandra, Andheri and Goregaon from CSMT or Panvel and vice versa. In March 2024 re-naming the station Tirthankar Parshvanath after Parshvanatha received official approval, though it is unclear when or if this has happened.

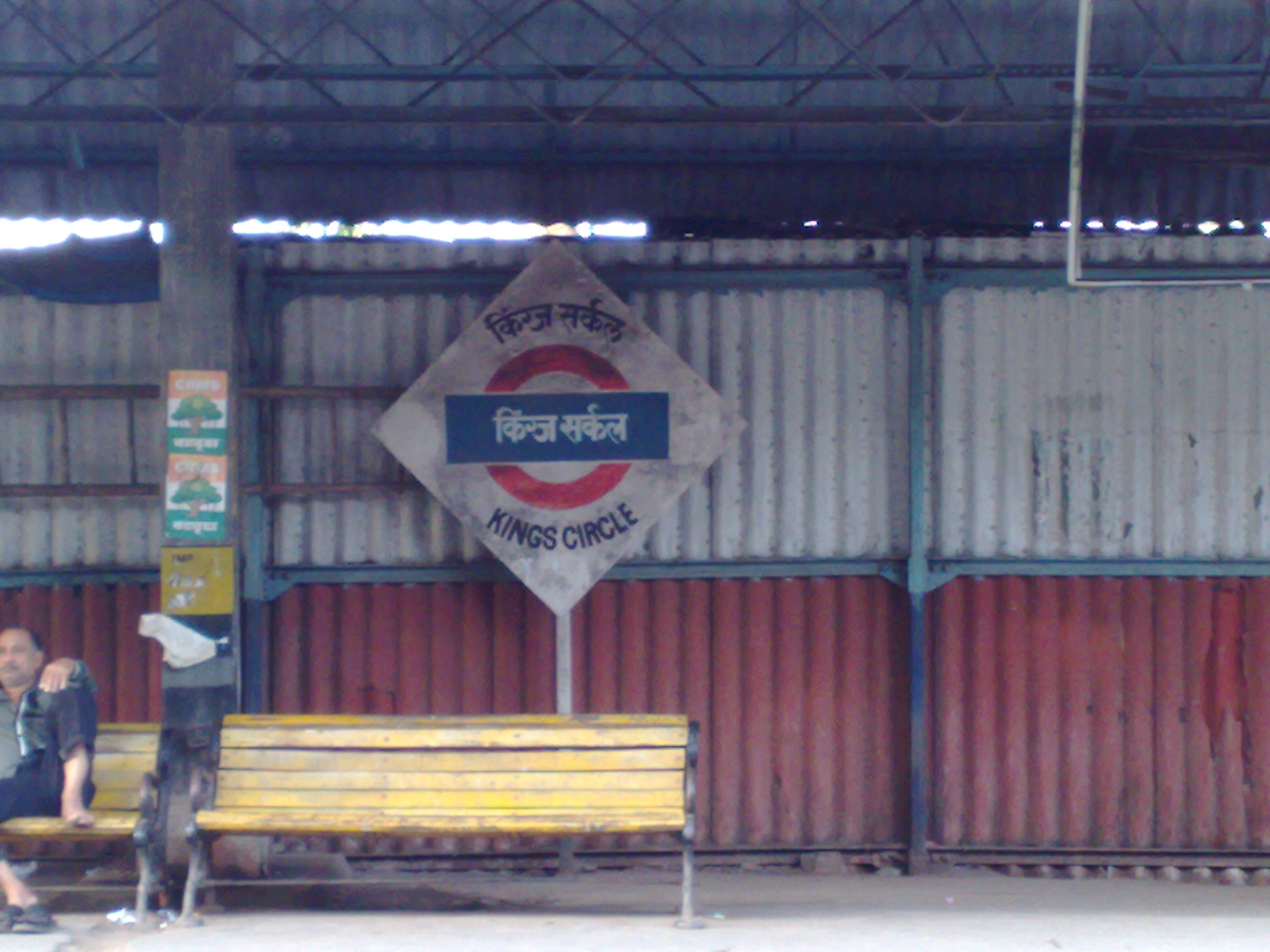
Kings Circle - Southbound platform

== See also ==
- Maheshwari Udyan, Mumbai
- Mumbai Suburban Railway
