= Wadala Road railway station =

Railway Station in Maharashtra, India

Wadala Road

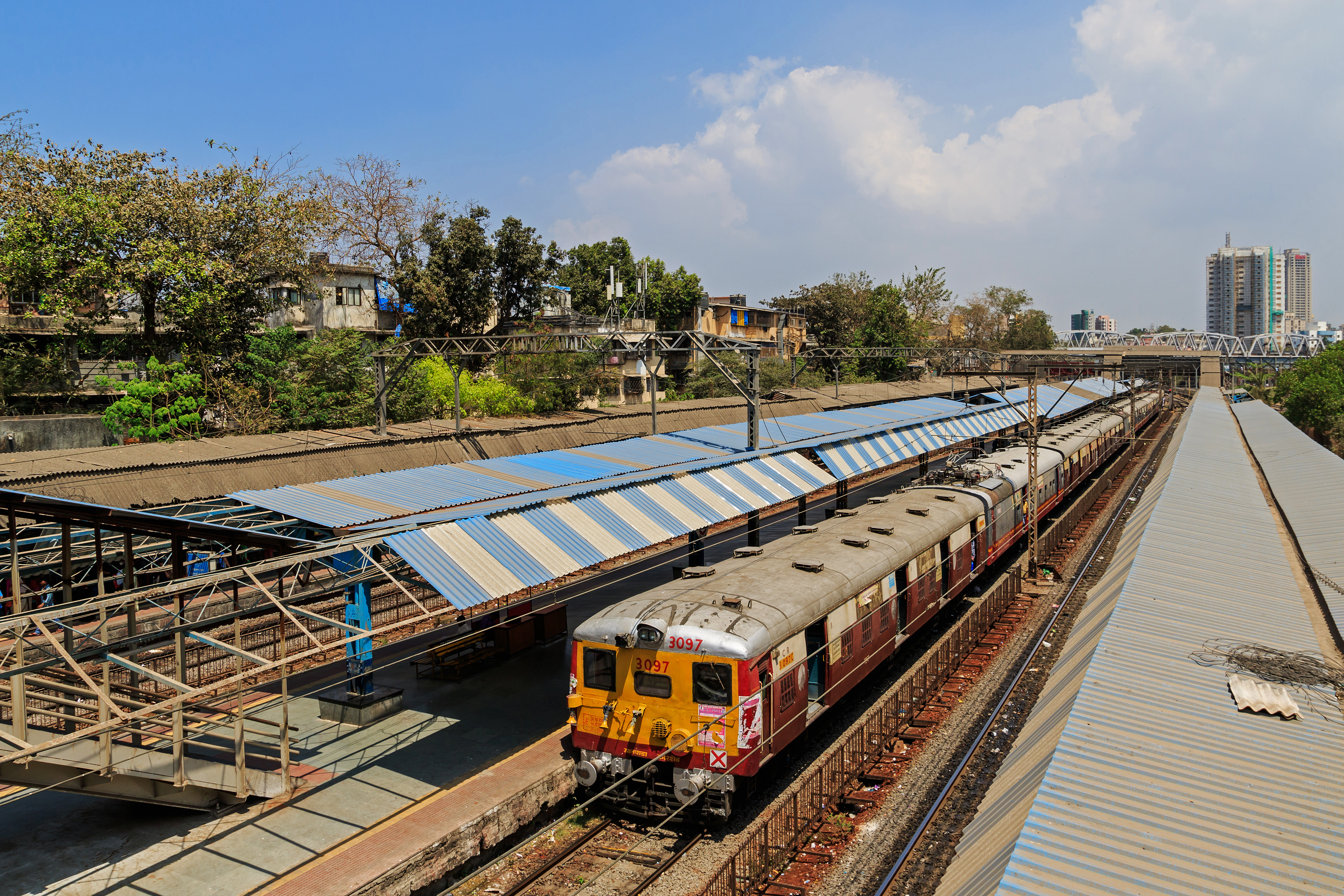
- Wadala Road

General information
- Location: Wadala
- Coordinates: 19.0160°N 72.8588°E
- System: Mumbai Suburban Railway station
- Owner: Ministry of Railways, Indian Railways
- Line: Harbour line
- Platforms: 4
- Connections: Wadala Bridge monorail station

Construction
- Structure type: Standard on-ground station

Other information
- Status: Active
- Station code: VD (suburban); VDLR (mainline)
- Fare zone: Central Railway zone

History
- Opened: 22 February 1914

Passengers
- 2012-13: 1,60,645

Services
Preceding station	Mumbai Suburban Railway	Following station
Sewri towards Chhatrapati Shivaji Terminus	Harbour line	King's Circle towards Goregaon
Sewri towards Chhatrapati Shivaji Terminus	Harbour line	Guru Tegh Bahadur Nagar towards Panvel
Preceding station	Mumbai Monorail	Following station
Out-of-system interchange
Acharya Atre Nagar towards Chembur	Line 1 transfer at Wadala Bridge	Dadar (East) towards Sant Gadge Maharaj Chowk
Route map
Harbour line
Location
- Location within India Location within Maharashtra Location within Mumbai

Wadala Road (formerly Vuddalah Road, station code: VDLR/VD) is a railway station on the Harbour line of the Mumbai Suburban Railway. It was earlier called Gowari station.

This station is infamous for deaths of people who are crossing the tracks. Previously, forty people were killed on the tracks here every year. After behavioral "nudges" were implemented, such as painting ties to help people judge the speed of oncoming trains, and adding pictures of men being run over, the number of deaths reduced to 10 each year.

== History ==
This station was opened in February 1914. It was then renamed to Gowari between 1914-17. The station was temporarily closed along with Koliwada (GTB Nagar station) on 22 November 1919, before being reopened on 1 April 1921. It was renamed to Wadala Road in April 1933.

== Platforms ==
This station has 4 Platforms. PF 1 for trains towards Panvel/Goregaon, PF 2 & 3 for trains terminating / originating from here and PF 4 for Trains towards CSMT.

== Gallery ==
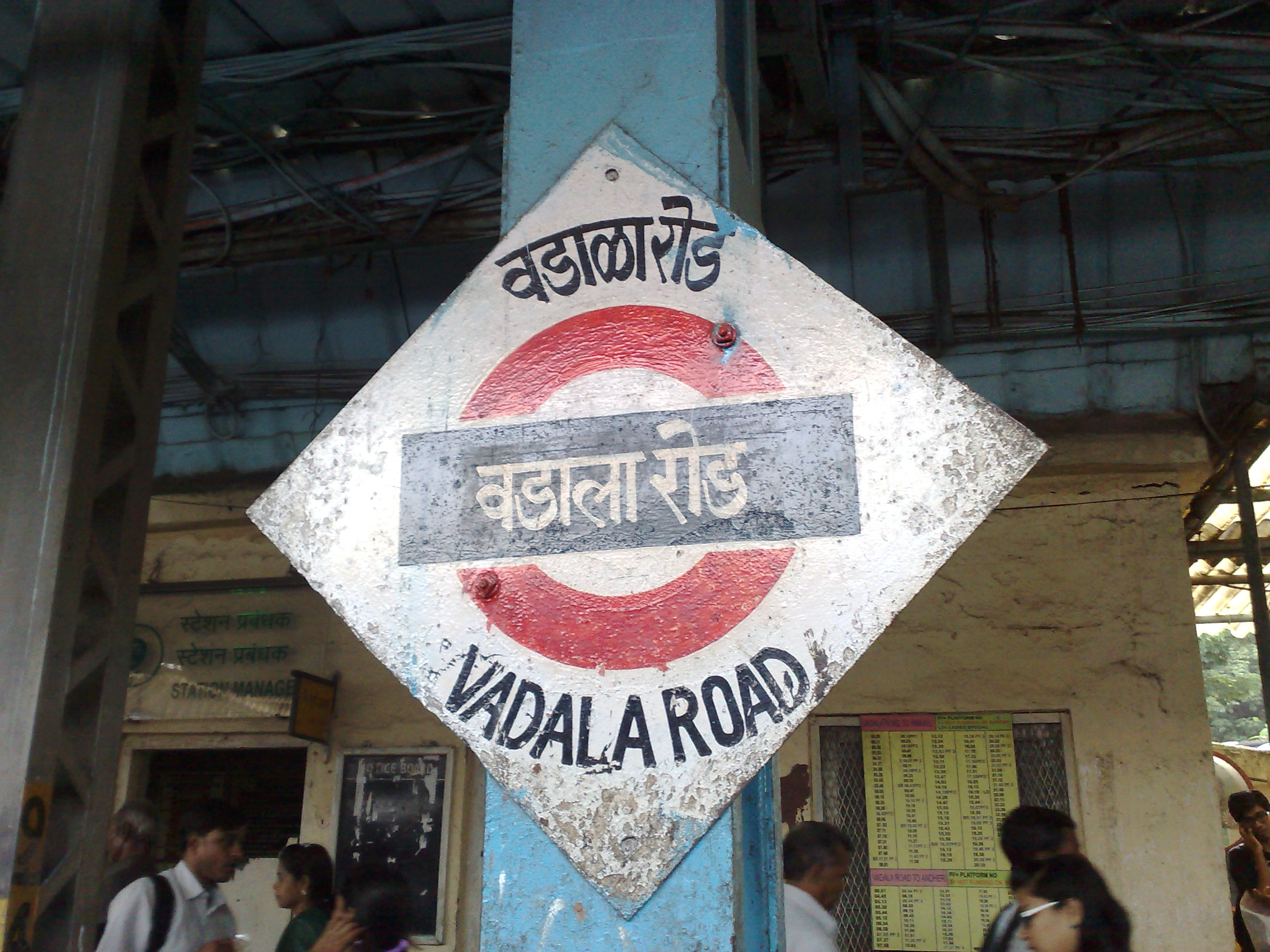
