= Mysore Colony monorail station =

Monorail station in Mumbai, India

Mysore Colony

General information
- Coordinates: 19.027760°N 72.891277°E
- System: Monorail station
- Owner: Mumbai Metropolitan Region Development Authority (MMRDA)
- Line: Line 1
- Tracks: 2

Construction
- Structure type: Elevated
- Parking: No
- Cycle facilities: No

History
- Opened: 2 February 2014; 12 years ago

Passengers
- 2014: 1000 daily

Services
Preceding station	Mumbai Monorail	Following station
Bharat Petroleum towards Chembur	Line 1	Bhakti Park towards Sant Gadge Maharaj Chowk
Route map
- Sources: Google Maps
Location
- Location within Mumbai

Mysore Colony is a monorail station of the Mumbai Monorail, serving the only passenger Rail connectivity to Mahul region of Eastern Mumbai.

It gives direct connectivity to the Bharat Petroleum Refinery, Tata Thermal Power Plant, Trombay MSETCL Substation from Chembur, Curry Road station, Lalbaug, Lower Parel railway station & Wadala, Suburban Railway stations. It was opened to the public on 2 February 2014, as part of the first phase of Line 1. Mysuru Colony recorded the lowest passenger traffic among the 7 stations of Line 1 during the first 3 days of operation.
