= GTB =

GTB may refer to:

- Grand Traverse Band of Ottawa and Chippewa Indians
- Gran Turismo Berlinetta, Ferrari car models
- Global Trust Bank (India)
- Goolpur Talbani railway station (Pakistan)
- Textile and Clothing Union (Gewerkschaft Textil-Bekleidung), a former German trade union
- GTB (advertising agency), Dearborn, Michigan, US
- Wheeler-Sack Army Airfield, Fort Drum, New York, US, FAA LID
- BT (musician), alias
- Grand Theft Bus, a Canadian indie rock band
- Google Toolbar
- GTB Standard Time, an alternative name for Eastern European Time (used in Greece, Turkey, Bulgaria)
- Guru Tegh Bahadur, ninth Sikh guru from 1665 to 1675
  - Guru Tegh Bahadur Nagar (GTB Nagar)
    - Guru Tegh Bahadur Nagar (GTB Nagar), Delhi, India
      - Guru Tegh Bahadur Nagar (GTB Nagar) metro station
    - Guru Tegh Bahadur Nagar (GTB Nagar), Mumbai, India (formerly known as Koliwada)
      - Guru Tegh Bahadur Nagar (GTB Nagar) railway station
      - Guru Tegh Bahadur Nagar (GTB Nagar) monorail station
- Drain Gang, formerly known as Gravity Boys Shield Gang, abbreviated to GTB
