= Dadar (East) monorail station =

Dadar East

General information
- Location: GD Ambedkar Marg, Dadar Parsi Colony, Mumbai
- Coordinates: 19.016311°N 72.852302°E
- System: Monorail Station
- Owner: Mumbai Metropolitan Region Development Authority (MMRDA)
- Line: Line 1
- Tracks: 2

Construction
- Structure type: Elevated
- Parking: No
- Cycle facilities: No

History
- Opened: 3 March 2019; 7 years ago

Passengers
- 2019: 1000 daily

Services
| Preceding station | Mumbai Monorail | Following station |
|---|---|---|
| Wadala Bridge towards Chembur | Line 1 | Naigaon towards Sant Gadge Maharaj Chowk |
Route map
- Sources: Google Maps
Location
- Location within Mumbai

Dadar East is a monorail station of the Mumbai Monorail located beside the famous Pratipandharpur Vitthal Temple on GD Ambedkar Marg in the Dadar Parsi Colony suburb of Mumbai, India.

There is demand for Renaming Dadar (East) monorail station into Vitthal Mandir monorail station because of Vitthal Mandir is nearby at this monorail station so it would preferable for tourists.
