= Ambedkar Nagar monorail station =

Monorail station in Mumbai, India

Ambedkar Nagar

General information
- Location: Acharya Donde Marg, Parel Village, Parel, Mumbai; India
- Coordinates: 19.0016°N 72.8442°E
- System: Monorail station
- Owner: Mumbai Metropolitan Region Development Authority (MMRDA)
- Line: Line 1
- Tracks: 2

Construction
- Structure type: Elevated
- Parking: No
- Cycle facilities: No

History
- Opened: 3 March 2019; 7 years ago

Services
Preceding station	Mumbai Monorail	Following station
Naigaon towards Chembur	Line 1	Mint Colony towards Sant Gadge Maharaj Chowk
Route map
- Sources: Google Maps
Location
- Location within Mumbai

Ambedkar Nagar is a monorail station on Line 1 of the Mumbai Monorail. It was opened to the public on 3 March 2019, as part of the second phase of Line 1.
