= Naigaon monorail station =

Mumbai Monorail Station

Naigaon

General information
- Location: Spring Mill Complex, Wadala, Mumbai
- Coordinates: 19.009529°N 72.847878°E
- System: monorail station
- Owner: Mumbai Metropolitan Region Development Authority (MMRDA)
- Operator: MMRDA
- Line: Line 1
- Tracks: 2

Construction
- Structure type: Elevated
- Platform levels: 2
- Parking: No
- Cycle facilities: No

History
- Opened: 3 March 2019; 7 years ago

Passengers
- 2019: 1000 daily

Services
Preceding station	Mumbai Monorail	Following station
Dadar (East) towards Chembur	Line 1	Ambedkar Nagar towards Sant Gadge Maharaj Chowk
Route map
- Sources: Google Maps
Location
- Location within Mumbai

Naigaon is a monorail station on Line 1 of the Mumbai Monorail located at Spring Mill Complex in the Wadala suburb of Mumbai, India. Lies on the GD Ambedkar Marg which is nearby Spring Mill Complex.
