= Mint Colony monorail station =

Monorail station in Mumbai, India

Mint Colony

General information
- Location: Shri Sai Baba Marg, Parel, Mumbai
- Coordinates: 18.994503°N 72.843311°E
- System: monorail station
- Owner: Mumbai Metropolitan Region Development Authority (MMRDA)
- Line: Line 1
- Tracks: 2

Construction
- Structure type: Elevated
- Parking: No
- Cycle facilities: No

History
- Opened: 3 March 2019; 7 years ago

Passengers
- 2019: 1000 daily

Services
| Preceding station | Mumbai Monorail | Following station |
|---|---|---|
| Ambedkar Nagar towards Chembur | Line 1 | Lower Parel towards Sant Gadge Maharaj Chowk |
Route map
- Sources: Google Maps
Location
- Location within Mumbai

Mint Colony is a monorail station on Line 1 of the Mumbai Monorail located at Wadia Baug, Best Colony in the Parel suburb of Mumbai, India. Lies on the Shri Sai Baba Marg which is nearby Lalbaug Flyover.
