= Wadala Depot monorail station =

Mumbai Monorail station

Wadala Depot
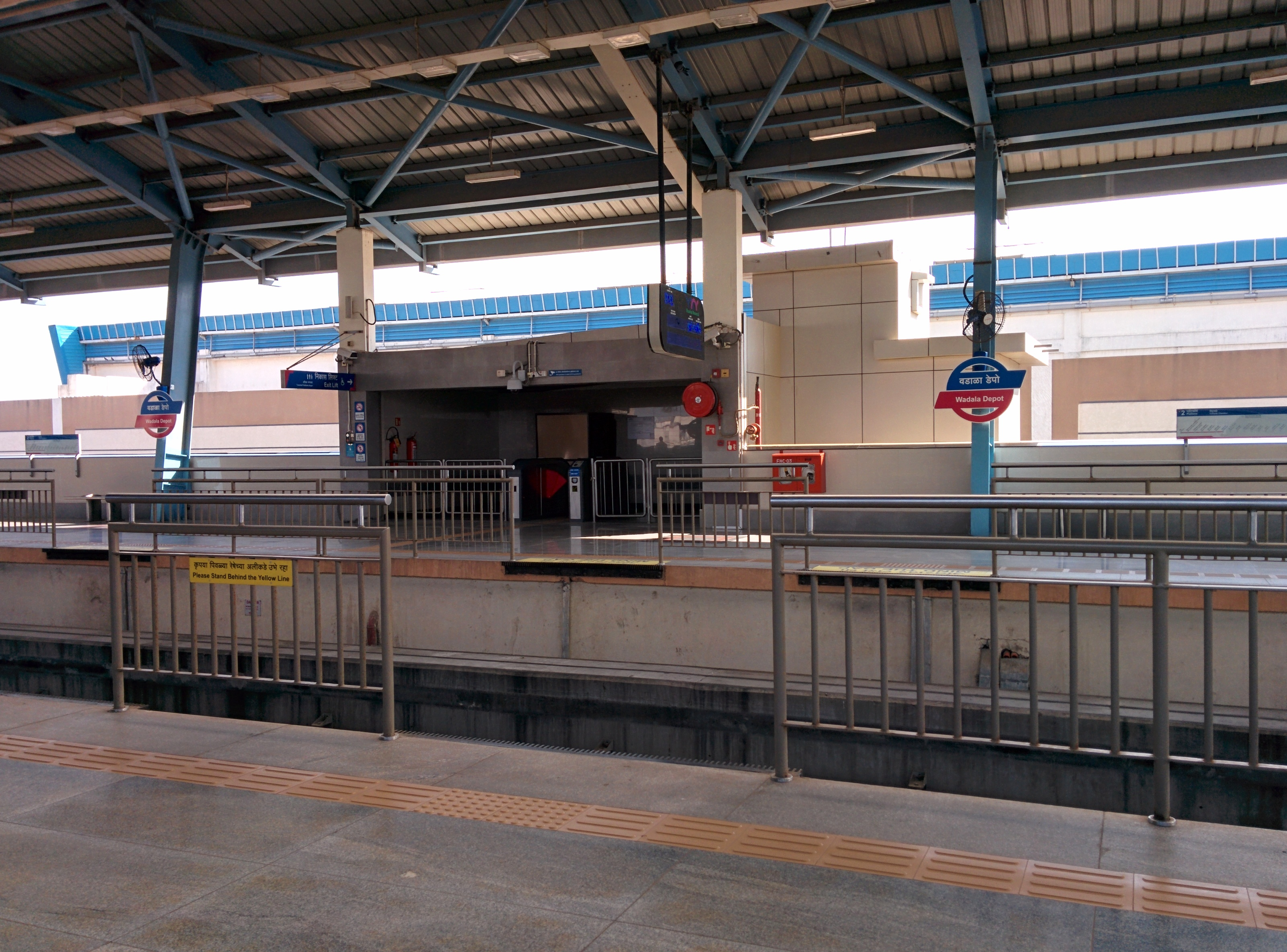

General information
- Location: Pratiksha Nagar, Sion, Mumbai
- Coordinates: 19.0388°N 72.8748°E
- System: monorail station
- Owner: Mumbai Metropolitan Region Development Authority (MMRDA)
- Operator: MMRDA
- Line: Line 1
- Tracks: 2

Construction
- Structure type: Elevated
- Platform levels: 2
- Parking: No
- Cycle facilities: No

History
- Opened: 2 February 2014; 12 years ago

Passengers
- 2014: 2650 daily

Services
Preceding station	Mumbai Monorail	Following station
Bhakti Park towards Chembur	Line 1	Guru Tegh Bahadur Nagar towards Sant Gadge Maharaj Chowk
Route map
- Sources: Google Maps
Location
- Location within Mumbai

Wadala Depot is a monorail station at which thee Monorail Car Depot is located of the Mumbai Monorail located at Pratiksha Nagar in the Sion suburb of Mumbai, India. It was opened to the public on 2 February 2014, as part of the first phase of Line 1. Wadala Depot is located near the Chunabhatti-Kurla junction of the Eastern Express Highway.
