= Fertiliser Township monorail station =

Fertiliser Township

General information
- Coordinates: 19.043849°N 72.893397°E
- System: Monorail station
- Owner: Mumbai Metropolitan Region Development Authority (MMRDA)
- Operator: MMRDA Mumbai Monorail
- Line: Line 1
- Tracks: 2

Construction
- Structure type: Elevated
- Parking: No
- Cycle facilities: No

History
- Opened: 2 February 2014; 12 years ago

Passengers
- 2014: 2200 daily

Services
Preceding station	Mumbai Monorail	Following station
VNP and RC Marg towards Chembur	Line 1	Bharat Petroleum towards Sant Gadge Maharaj Chowk
Route map
- Sources: Google Maps
Location
- Location within Mumbai

Fertiliser Township is a monorail station of Mumbai Monorail. It was opened to the public on 2 February 2014, as part of the first phase of Line 1. It serves Marouli area, Wadavli village, Tolaram Nagar and Camp(E) of Eastern Mumbai. It connects to Vivekananda Education Society.
