= Lalbaug =

- Neighbourhood
- Interactive map of Lalbaug
- Country: India
- State: Maharashtra
- District: Mumbai City
- City: Mumbai

Government
  - Type: Municipal Corporation
  - Body: Brihanmumbai Municipal Corporation (BMC)

Languages
  - Official: Marathi
- Time zone: UTC+5:30 (IST)
- PIN: 400012
- Area code: 022
- Vehicle registration: MH 01
- Civic agency: BMC

Lalbaug or (ISO: Lālbāg) is a neighbourhood in South Mumbai in Mumbai, the capital of Maharashtra an Indian state. It was once part of the neighbourhood called Girangaon, Mumbai's mill district that is now undergoing gentrification due to the shifting of textiles mills to Gujarat. Its railway stations include Currey Road station of Central Railway, Lower Parel station of Western Railway and the new Lower Parel station of the Mumbai Monorail.

== See also ==
- Lalbaugcha Raja (prominent idol during the Ganesh Chaturthi festival)
