= Bhakti Park monorail station =

Mumbai monorail station

Bhakti Park
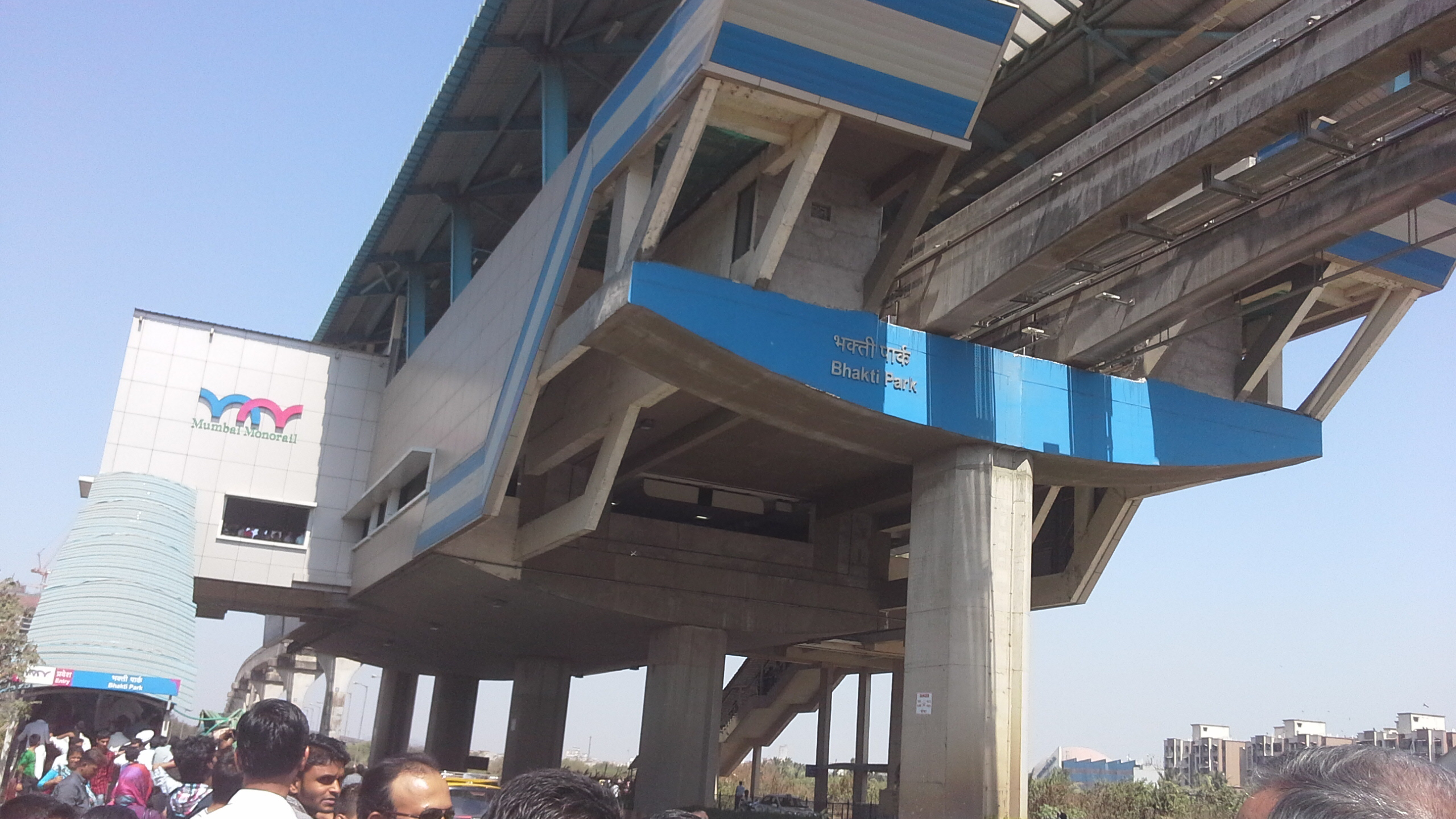

General information
- Coordinates: 19°01′45″N 72°52′39″E
- System: Mumbai Monorail station
- Owner: MMRDA
- Operator: Maha Mumbai Metro Operation Corp. Ltd (MMMOCL)
- Line: Line 1
- Platforms: 2
- Tracks: 2
- Connections: Line 4 Bhakti Park (Wadala)

Construction
- Structure type: Elevated
- Platform levels: 1
- Parking: No
- Cycle facilities: No

History
- Opened: 2 February 2014; 12 years ago

Passengers
- 2014: 700 daily

Services
Preceding station	Mumbai Monorail	Following station
Mysore Colony towards Chembur	Line 1	Wadala Depot towards Sant Gadge Maharaj Chowk
Route map
- Sources: Google Maps
Location
- Location within Mumbai

Bhakti Park is a monorail station on Line 1 of the Mumbai Monorail serving the Bhakti Park housing colony in the Wadala area of Mumbai, India. It was opened to the public on 2 February 2014, as part of the first phase of Line 1.

The station will also be an interchange for the upcoming fourth line of the Mumbai Metro. In 2018, an affidavit was filed in the Bombay High Court stating that the station was among four that did not receive the requisite clearances from the Mumbai Fire Brigade and Brihanmumbai Municipal Corporation.
