= Bharat Petroleum monorail station =

Bharat Petroleum

General information
- Coordinates: 19.035368°N 72.895426°E
- System: Monorail station
- Owner: Mumbai Metropolitan Region Development Authority (MMRDA)
- Line: Line 1
- Tracks: 2

Construction
- Structure type: Elevated
- Parking: No
- Cycle facilities: No

History
- Opened: 2 February 2014; 12 years ago

Passengers
- 2014: 3300 daily

Services
| Preceding station | Mumbai Monorail | Following station |
|---|---|---|
| Fertiliser Township towards Chembur | Line 1 | Mysore Colony towards Sant Gadge Maharaj Chowk |
Route map
- Sources: Google Maps
Location
- Location within Mumbai

Bharat Petroleum is a monorail station on Line 1 of the Mumbai Monorail. It was opened to the public on 2 February 2014, as part of the first phase of Line 1. It serves connectivity to Mahul Gaon, HP Nagar, Bharat Nagar, Shivaji Nagar, Om Ganesh Nagar, Tata Colony and RCF Colony.
