= Mumbai Monorail =

Monorail system in India

Coordinates: 19°3′40″N 72°53′51″E

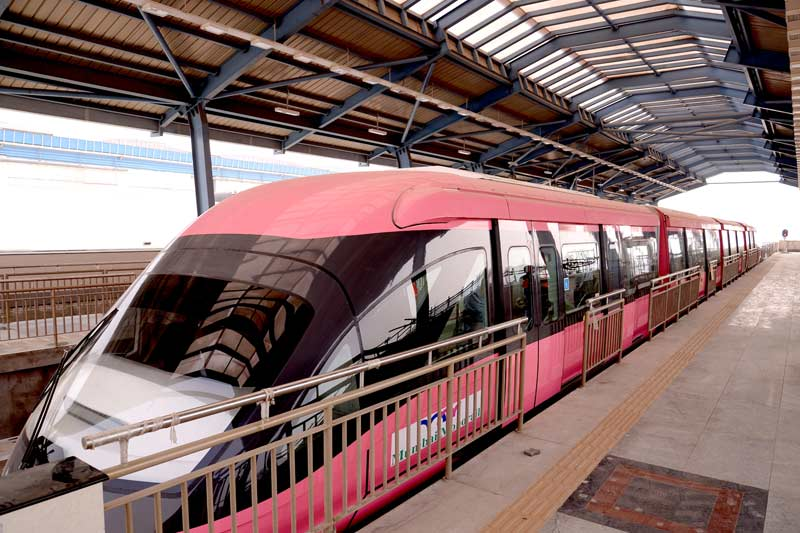

Overview
- Status: Operations Suspended
- Owner: MMRDA
- Locale: Mumbai, Maharashtra, India
- Termini: Chembur; Sant Gadge Maharaj Chowk
- Stations: 18

Service
- Type: Straddle-beam monorail
- Operator: Maha Mumbai Metro Operation Corp. Ltd (MMMOCL)
- Depot: Wadala Depot
- Rolling stock: Scomi (6); Medha Servo (10)
- Daily ridership: 19,000 (April 2017)
- Ridership: 13,072 (2014 weekdays); 16,699 (2014 weekends)

History
- Opened: 2 February 2014; 12 years ago

Technical
- Line length: 19.54 km (12.14 mi)
- Num of tracks: 2
- Character: Elevated
- Track gauge: Straddle-beam monorail
- Electrification: 750 V DC Third rail
- Operating speed: 32 km/h (20 mph) (average); 80 km/h (50 mph) (top)

The MMRDA Mumbai Monorail is a monorail line in the city of Mumbai, Maharashtra, India, built as part of a major expansion of public transport in the city. The project is operated by the Mumbai Metropolitan Region Development Authority (MMRDA).

The monorail runs from Chembur, in the city's eastern suburbs to Sant Gadge Maharaj Chowk at Mahalaxmi in South Mumbai, effectively connecting the city's Harbour Line, Central Line and Western Line.

The monorail, as its name suggests, runs on a narrow single track. A lightweight structure allows the trains to navigate sharp turns in congested urban areas. The Mumbai Monorail is the first in India since the Kundala Valley Railways and the Patiala State Monorail Trainways were closed in the 1920s.

The system began commercial operation in 2014, but has achieved only 10% of the estimated ridership. Over budget, with an "unnecessary" route poorly connected to other modes of transport and suffering from poor maintenance, the system has widely been described as a "failure". As of 2025, it remains the only operating monorail in India.

On 20 September 2025, the monorail was shut down due to numerous safety and reliability issues. Upgrades were initially scheduled to take two months to complete, but repeated setbacks have pushed the planned reopening date to June 2026.

== History ==
=== Background ===
The Mumbai Metropolitan Region Development Authority (MMRDA) first proposed a monorail in 2005.

On 11 November 2008, Larsen and Toubro partnered with the Malaysian company Scomi Engineering Bhd, and the joint venture (JV) company was awarded a ₹24.6 billion (US$260 million) contract by the MMRDA to build, operate, and maintain the project of around eight monorail routes in Mumbai by the year 2029. The construction of the first monorail line in Mumbai mostly began from 2014, which would connect Jacob Circle, Wadala and Mahul via Chembur, providing a feeder service to the existing Mumbai Suburban Railway. However, nothing concrete came out of the notification for many years.

In mid-2018, a dispute arose between the MMRDA and the Malaysian company LTSE, with both parties attempting to end the contract with each other. LTSE, which was reportedly defaulting on the contract on multiple counts, wrote to the MMRDA stating that its responsibilities were over, while the MMRDA was trying to end the contract with the Malaysian operator.

The contract with LTSE was finally ended in December 2018. The MMRDA has now taken over the operations of the monorail and, according to the MMRDA, the bus service operating in the city plied crowded and narrow areas at very slow speeds, thus offering no benefits to the commuters and adding to the traffic congestion. The MMRDA stated that the monorail would connect many parts of the city which were not connected by the suburban rail system or the proposed metro rail system. The agency also stated that the monorail would be an efficient feeder transit to the metro and suburban rail systems offering efficient, safe, air-conditioned, comfortable, and affordable public transport to commuters.

The cost of the monorail service was estimated in 2010 to be ₹2.0 billion (roughly ₹850 million (US$9.1 million) per km). Approximately 135 kilometres (84 mi) of line is planned to be built in phases between 2011 and 2031. The monorail service along with the metro lines, have been reported to have incurred losses.

=== Construction ===
Then Maharashtra Chief Minister Ashok Chavan laid the foundation stone in a ceremony at the Acres Club, Chembur on 9 February 2009. The MMRDA commissioned the construction of the line in two phases. The first stretch linked Wadala on the outskirts of the island city with Chembur in the north-east, and the second connected Wadala with Jacob Circle in South Mumbai. The original deadline for the project was April 2011. The project was delayed by issues involving land, removal of encroachments, delays in getting permissions from the civic body and railways, and missed several deadlines for completion. The following months had all been announced as deadlines for the first phase - December 2010, May 2011, November 2011, May 2012, December 2012, June 2013, August 2013, 15 September 2013, October 2013 and December 2013. Deadlines announced for the second phase were May 2011, December 2011, May 2012, December 2012, December 2013, June 2014, December 2014 and March 2015. A Right to Information (RTI) request filed by RTI activist Anil Galgali revealed that the three-year delay in commissioning the monorail was primarily due to change of alignment of its route, which led to further cost escalation of the project.

A 108-meter test run was successfully conducted on 26 January 2010. A one-kilometer test run from Wadala to the Bhakti Park monorail station was undertaken on 18 February 2012. The first test run of the entire route was conducted by the MMRDA in November 2012.

In late December 2013, the MMRDA announced that it had submitted an application to Safety Certification Authority (Engineer) for the Chembur-Wadala stretch. The Safety Certification Authority goes through the documents, and physically inspects the corridor, and commercial operations can commence only after receiving its approval. The electrical systems were certified by the Electrical Inspector General. The contractor, the consortium of L&T and Scomi Engineering, had safety checks performed by an independent inspector. Official safety checks were performed by SMRT Corp of Singapore and R.C. Garg, retired Commissioner of Railway Safety. The final safety certificate was issued on 20 January. The safety certificate was then forwarded to the State Government, which issued a notification for commissioning the system. The notification contains norms for operation and maintenance of the system, which requires approval from the Chief Minister.

=== Opening ===
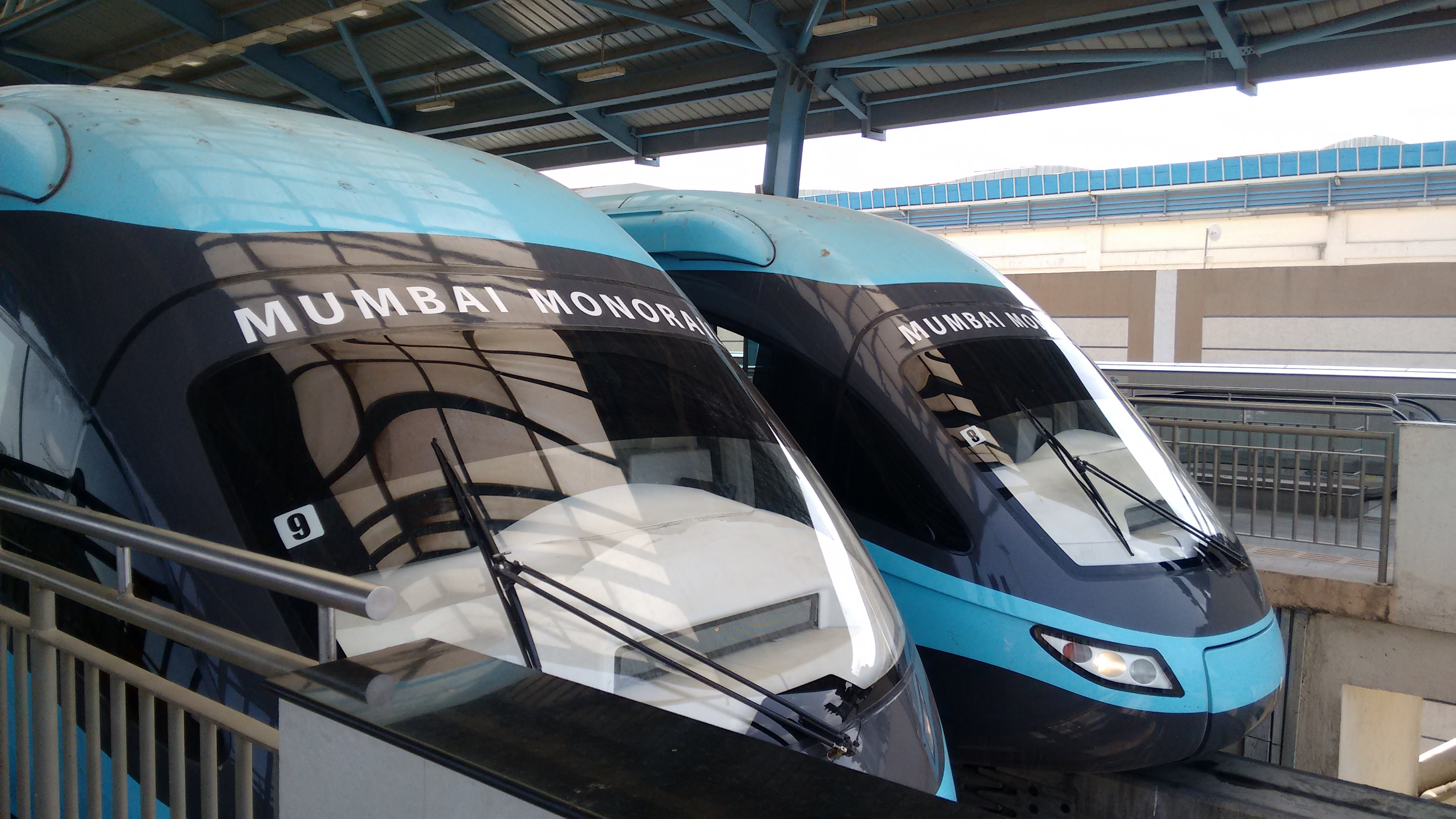
Mumbai Monorail trains parked at Wadala Depot station

Line 1 was inaugurated by Maharashtra Chief Minister Prithviraj Chavan on 1 February 2014 at the Wadala Depot monorail station. After flagging off the first monorail train at 3:47 p.m., Chavan along with Deputy Chief Minister Ajit Pawar, and other officials rode the entire route, arriving at Chembur monorail station, 20 minutes later. The party then proceeded to Gandhi Maidan, 15th Road, Chembur (East), where the Chavan declared the monorail "open". The monorail was opened to the public the following day, with the first trip commencing from Wadala Depot at 7:08 a.m. According to the MMRDA, it had very few passengers, as the gates were opened to the public only at 7:10 am, when the train had already left. The first train from the opposite side, departed Chembur at 7:10 am Services had been scheduled to operate until 3:00 p.m., however, station doors were closed by 2:30 p.m. due to larger than expected ridership. Services were operated until 4:30 p.m., in order to provide a ride to everyone who had purchased a ticket. On opening day, 19,678 passengers travelled on the line. Sixty-six services were operated on the first day, netting a revenue of ₹2.2 lakh (US$2,400) through the sale of tickets and smart cards.

In the first week of operations (2–8 February 2014), the monorail transported 1,36,865 passengers in about 512 trips, earning a total revenue of ₹1,424,810. A total of 132,523 tokens and 1409 smart cards were also sold during the first week. According to the MMRDA, between 2 February and 1 March, a total of 458,871 commuters used the monorail, generating a total revenue ₹4,466,522. The monorail was closed for the first time on 17 March 2014 due to Holi.

Years of delays later, Phase 2 was inaugurated by Maharashtra Chief Minister Devendra Fadnavis on 3 March 2019.

Line 1
Extension date	Termini		Length	Stations
2 February 2014	Chembur	Wadala Depot	8.93 kilometers (5.55 mi)	7
3 March 2019	Wadala Depot	Jacob Circle	11.28 kilometers (7.01 mi)	10
Total	Chembur	Jacob Circle	19.52 kilometers (12.13 mi)	17

=== 2025-2026 closure ===
On 20 September 2025, the Mumbai Metropolitan Region Development Authority (MMRDA) temporarily suspended all monorail operations to execute a comprehensive system-wide modernization and infrastructure overhaul. The upgrade included replacing the old infrastructure with a new Communication-Based Train Control (CBTC) signaling system and introducing 10 new indigenously manufactured train rakes supplied by Medha Servo Drives. By June 2026, the upgraded CBTC system cleared mandatory statutory inspections and received final safety certifications from the Commissioner of Metro Rail Safety (CMRS), alongside administrative approval from the Government of Maharashtra to resume operations. Despite completing safety clearances, passenger services remain suspended as of August 2026 while MMRDA conducts daily technical trial runs across the 19.54 km corridor to stabilize the new systems before establishing an official public reopening date.

== Plan ==
The Mumbai Monorail master plan proposed the construction of 8 lines at a cost of ₹202.96 billion (US$2.2 billion).

Phase	Line	Corridor	Length (km)	Estimated cost
Phase I	1	Chembur–Wadala Depot–Sant Gadge Maharaj Chowk	19.54	₹27.16 billion (US$290 million)
Phase I	2	Mulund–Goregaon–Borivali	30	₹41.7 billion (US$450 million)
Phase I	4	Lokhandwala–SEEPZ–Kanjur Marg	13.14	₹18,265 million (US$200 million)
Phase I	5	Thane – Mira-Bhayandar – Dahisar	24.25	₹33,708 million (US$360 million)
Phase II	6	Kalyan–Ulhasnagar–Dombivli	26.40	₹36,696 million (US$390 million)
Phase II	7	Chembur–Ghatkopar–Koparkhairane	16.72	₹36,863 million (US$390 million)
Phase II	8	Mahape–Shil Phata–Kalyan	21.10	₹29,329 million (US$310 million)

=== Line 1 ===
Phase 1 of Line 1 on Mumbai map

The only operational line of the Mumbai Monorail, Line 1 connects Sant Gadge Maharaj Chowk in South Mumbai with Chembur in eastern Mumbai. It was built at a cost of approximately ₹3,000 crore (US$320 million). The 20.21 km line is fully elevated. Line 1 is owned and operated by the MMRDA. The monorail supplements service of the Mumbai Suburban Railway in some heavily populated areas. The first phase, built at a cost of ₹1,100 crore (US$120 million), consists of 7 stations from Chembur to Wadala Depot, and was opened to the public on 2 February 2014. An extension for Line 1 consisting of 11 stations from Wadala Depot to Jacob Circle was built at a cost of ₹1,900 crore (US$200 million). It suffered through delays due to shortage of functional monorail rakes. Phase 2 finally opened on 3 March 2019.

Line 1
#	Station Name		Opening	Connections
#	English	Marathi	Opening	Connections
1	Chembur	चेंबूर	2 February 2014	Harbour Chembur
2	VNP and RC Marg Junction	व्हीएनपी आणि आरसी मार्ग जंक्शन	2 February 2014	Yellow Line
3	Fertiliser Township	फर्टीलाइझर टाउनशिप	2 February 2014	None
4	Bharat Petroleum	भारत पेट्रोलियम	2 February 2014	None
5	Mysore Colony	मैसूर कॉलनी	2 February 2014	None
6	Bhakti Park	भक्ती पार्क	2 February 2014	Green Line (Under construction)
7	Wadala Depot	वडाळा डेपो	2 February 2014	None
8	Guru Tegh Bahadur Nagar	गुरू तेग बहादुर नगर	3 March 2019	Harbour Guru Tegh Bahadur Nagar
9	Antop Hill	अँटॉप हिल	3 March 2019	None
10	Acharya Atre Nagar	आचार्य अत्रे नगर	3 March 2019	None
11	Wadala Bridge	वडाळा ब्रिज	3 March 2019	Harbour Wadala Road
12	Dadar (East)	दादर (पूर्व)	3 March 2019	None
13	Naigaon	नायगाव	3 March 2019	None
14	Ambedkar Nagar	आंबेडकर नगर	3 March 2019	None
15	Mint Colony	मिंट कॉलनी	3 March 2019	None
16	Lower Parel	लोअर परळ	3 March 2019	Western Lower Parel
17	Sant Gadge Maharaj Chowk	संत गाडगे महाराज चौक	3 March 2019	Aqua Line

=== Expansion plans ===
In September 2011, the MMRDA said that did not have an immediate plan to begin construction of a second monorail line in the region. They clarified that although it did not mean that they are not interested in carrying out the project, it may not follow the currently planned schedule. An MMRDA official stated, "There is no point in going for new routes. As long as the first route is not commissioned and the results are not out, we would not commission any new routes. MMRDA feels the need for a monorail would arise after all the proposed metro rail routes were commissioned with the monorail serving as a feeder service."

In 2009, the MMRDA proposed the construction of an additional line on the Thane-Bhiwandi-Kalyan route. The route was proposed to have a station at every kilometer, cost ₹3,750 crore (equivalent to ₹100 billion or US$1.1 billion in 2026) and be implemented on public-private partnership basis. It was further proposed to extend the corridor from Kalyan to Badlapur in the next phase. This project was shelved by the MMRDA in February 2014. The proposed corridor would have been 23.75 km long, and cost approximately ₹3,169 crore.

Further development of the monorail system is on hold, and questions have been raised as to whether the proposed monorail corridors will have sufficient capacity to meet Mumbai's requirements. The monorail may not be further extended by the MMRDA, as it may prove inadequate for Mumbai's population density. Foreign consultants have suggested a Metro or LRT system over a monorail for many Indian cities, e.g. Bangalore.

== Infrastructure ==
=== Rolling stock ===
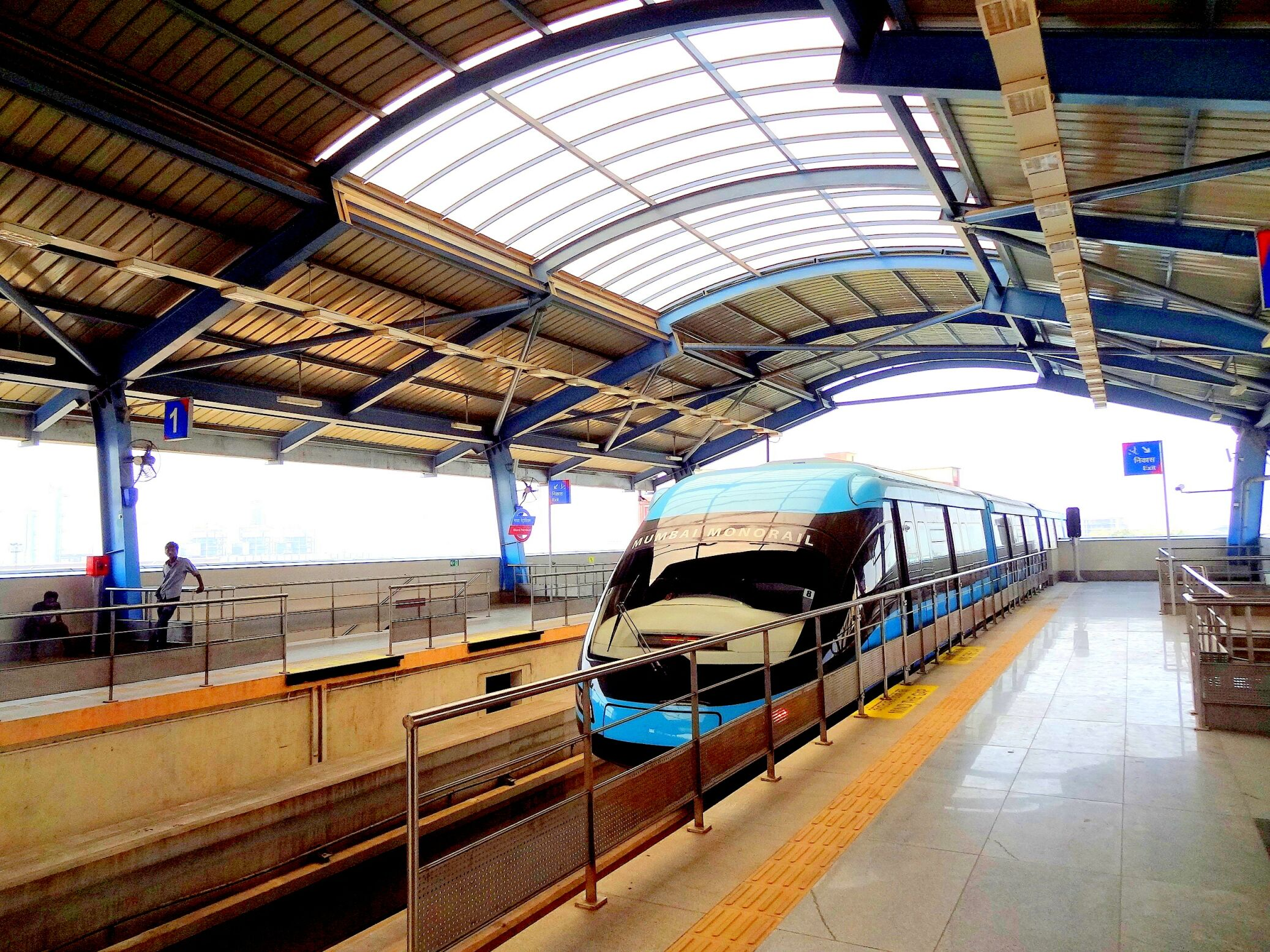
A train arriving

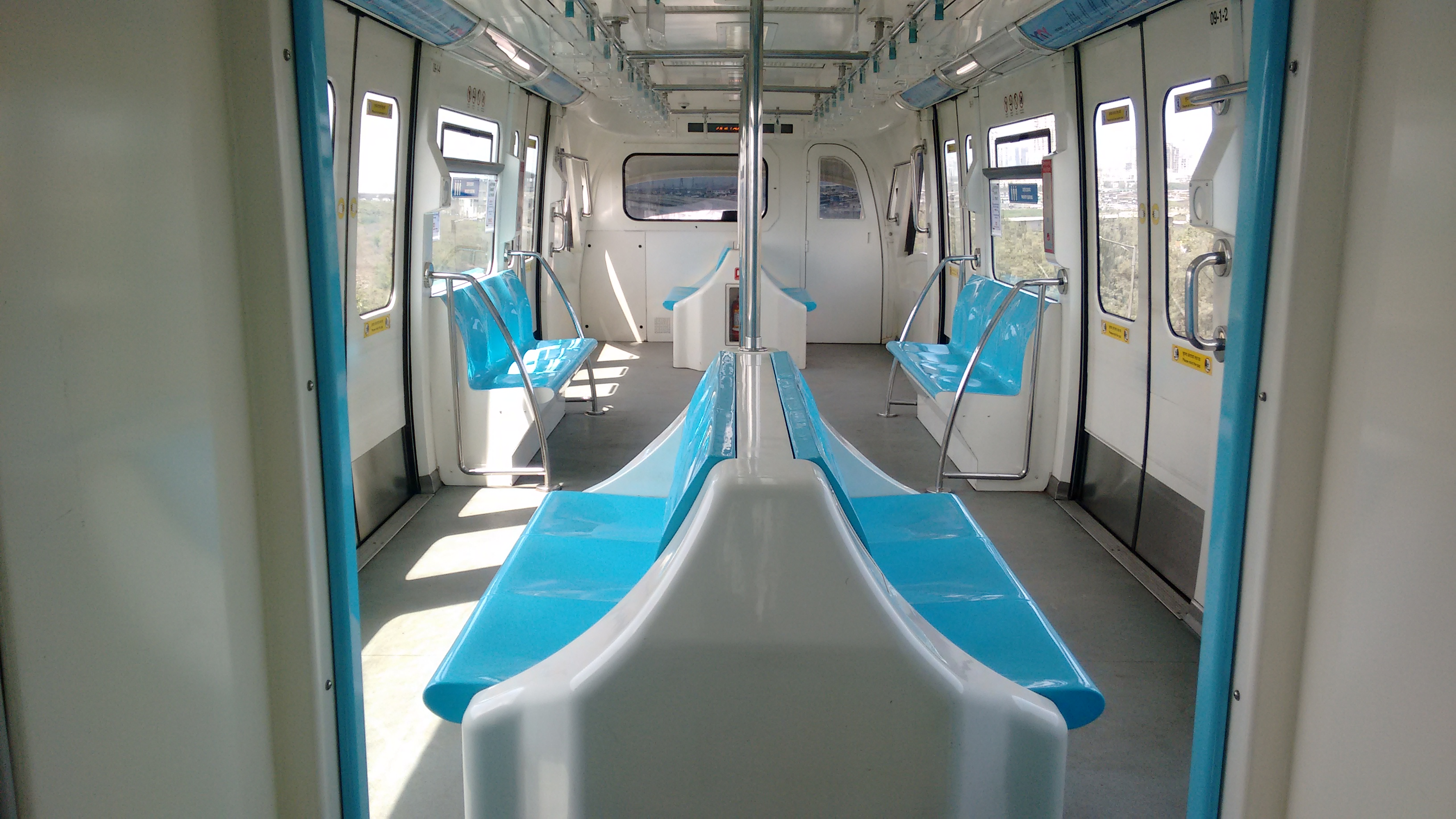
Interior view

The monorail uses Scomi SUTRA systems built in Malaysia by Scomi Rail Bhd. The first car was shipped to India on 2 January 2010, marking the first time that rail cars manufactured by the company were exported overseas. Six trains currently operate in the first phase of the line. Ten more will be added in the second phase. Monorail trains are royal pink, apple green, and ice blue in colour, with black and white stripes.

Each monorail train consists of four coaches with a combined passenger capacity of 568. The low number of seats was to ensure that the flow of people in and out of the coach was not hampered. Some sections of seats are reserved for pregnant women, the elderly and the disabled. Handrails and handgrips are installed in coaches, within easy reach of all standing passengers. A 4-coach monorail train has a total length of 44.8 metres, and each coach weighs 15 tonnes. All coaches are air-conditioned. There are two CCTV cameras installed in each coach.

In March 2023, after an uptick in ridership, the MMRDA ordered 10 new trains for the route.

=== Stations ===
The elevated stations can be reached via staircases and escalators. Stations do not have any public toilets. MMRDA Commissioner UPS Madan said, "Nowhere in the world are there public toilets at monorail stations. The monorail journey is a short one, so the provision of public toilets was not made when the plan for stations was chalked out." All stations are equipped with baggage scanners, armed security guards at all stations entry points and CCTV cameras. Personnel of the Maharashtra State Security Corporation (MSSC) are deployed at the stations.

As part of the Station Area Traffic Improvement Scheme (SATIS), the MMRDA announced in April 2017 that it would move all bus and taxi stands to a distance of about 40–50 metres away from the monorail stations. The MMRDA believes that the current location of the stand just next the stations results in traffic congestion and restricts movement of pedestrians.

=== Depot and control centre ===
At Wadala, facilities were built on a 6.5-hectare site for administration and other operational needs. The operation control centre is equipped with surveillance video feeds from CCTVs and SCADA (supervisory control and data acquisition), which monitors the power supply. Vehicle and train washing specialist Smith Bros & Webb was awarded a contract to provide Britannia Train Wash plants for the Mumbai Monorail. Smith Bros & Webb designs and manufactures its own wash equipment under the brand name of Britannia.

=== Safety and security ===
Every station on the line is equipped with metal detectors, X-ray baggage scanners, and CCTV cameras in compliance with national standards. Around 500 armed personnel and private guards are deployed at the 7 stations of the first phase. Officers in plainclothes are present inside trains, and real-time checks are conducted to curb criminal activities. All stations have armed security guards at all entry points, and personnel of the Maharashtra State Security Corporation (MSSC) are deployed at the stations. All personnel manning the station premises are equipped with hand-held detectors. A bomb detection and disposal squad and a dog squad are also deployed at all stations.

Train operators will be given breath analyser tests when they report for duty. Violations will be met with disciplinary action, fines, and possible civil charges.

== Operations ==
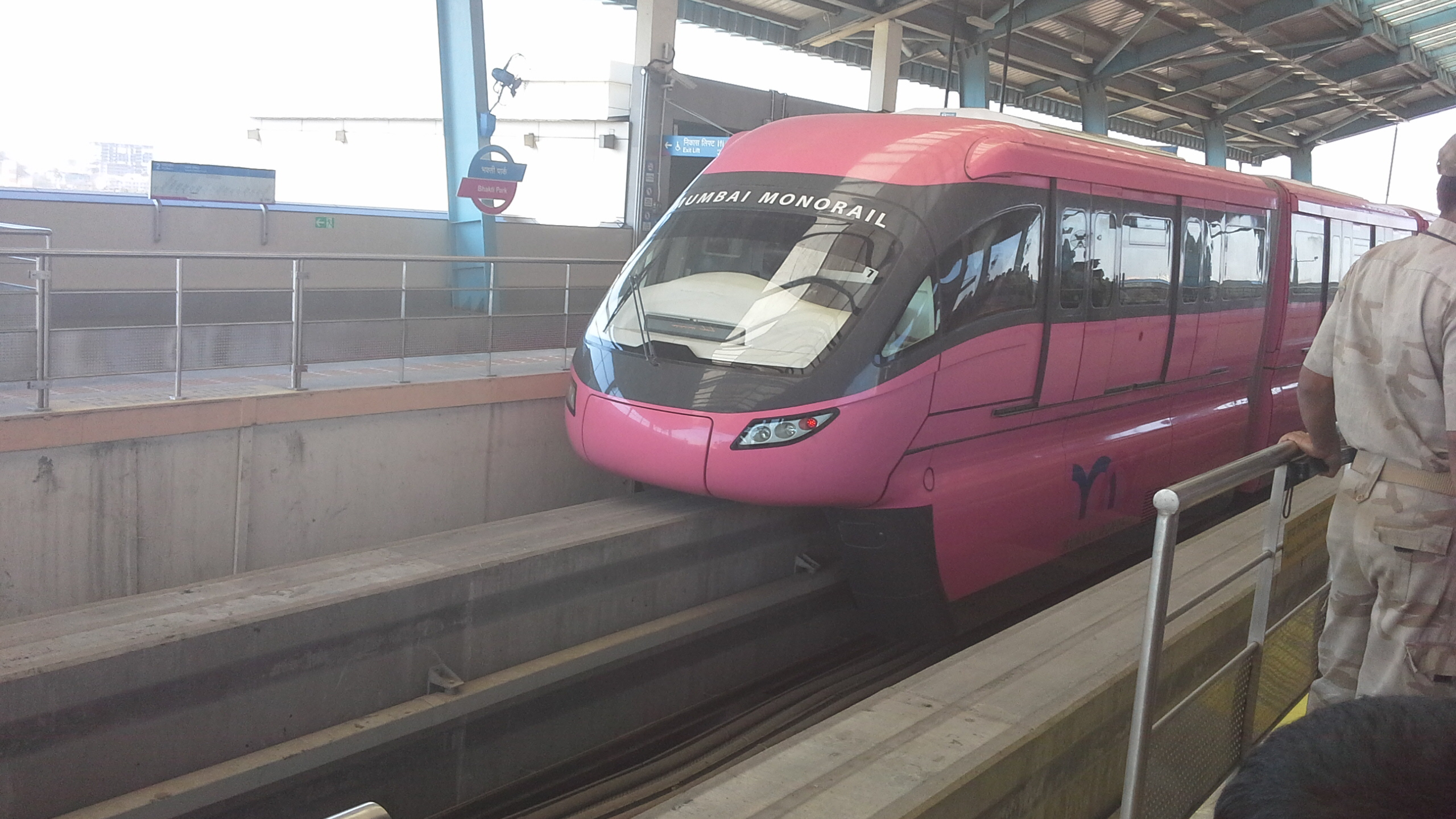
A Mumbai Monorail train at Bhakti Park station

=== Operator ===
Scomi Engineering built and operated the monorail line. The MMRDA paid Scomi ₹15.60 crore (US$1.7 million) monthly as fees for operating the line. The MMRDA terminated the Scomi and L&T consortium's contract to operate the monorail on 14 December 2018 citing failure to meet contractual obligations despite several deadline extensions. Subsequently, the MMRDA assumed control over the operations and maintenance of the monorail.

=== Ticketing ===
The Mumbai Monorail uses an automated fare collection system, where tickets are sold in the form of electronically programmed journey tokens. Tokens are valid for 20 minutes for use at the same station, and 90 minutes for exit at any other station. The minimum fare on the line is ₹5 and the maximum is ₹11. A smart card costs ₹100 (US$1.10), of which ₹50 is a refundable security deposit and ₹50 can be used for travel. Children below 90 cm height ride for free. No tourist passes are sold. The MMRDA had planned to allow the purchase return tickets, but initially dropped plans due to "complications". However, same-day return journey tokens were introduced from October 2014. They are considering offering passes for daily, monthly, and quarterly use.

Fares

Fares as of 2025.

Distance (km)	Cost
0 - 3	₹10 (11¢ US)
3 - 12	₹20 (21¢ US)
12 - 18	₹30 (32¢ US)
18 - 24	₹40 (43¢ US)

=== Frequency ===
Trains operate from 6 am to 10 pm, with the last service departing from both Wadala Depot and Chembur at 2207 (10:07 pm). The services are operated every 15 minutes on the line. Trains have a top speed of 80 km/h, and an average speed of 65 km/h. The system has been designed for a 3-minute headway with operation from 05:00 to 24:00.

Monorail services initially operated only between 7 am and 3 pm, running 64 services per day. The MMRDA had stated that operating hours would be extended after authorities increased operations and maintenance staff, as well as studied the passenger traffic. MMRDA commissioner U.P.S. Madan announced on 3 March 2014 that monorail services would operate from 7 am to 7 pm before the end of that month. This was later postponed to mid-April, but plans were modified to operate the monorail in a 14-hour shift from 6 am to 8 pm. The MMRDA doubled its staff strength in order to operate the additional services. The monorail began operating from 6 am to 8 pm, starting 15 April 2014, bringing the total number of services operating per day to 112. Operating hours were further extended to 10 pm starting 15 August 2014, increasing the number of daily services to 131.

=== Ridership ===
On opening day, 19,678 passengers travelled on the line. Sixty-six services were operated on the first day, netting a revenue of ₹2.2 lakh (US$2,400) through the sale of tickets and smart cards. Sixty-four services were operated on the second day of operations, a frequency of one train every 7–8 minutes. Around 19,600 passengers used the monorail service, netting a revenue of ₹2.5 lakh (US$2,700). On the second day operations, the MMRDA also announced that it had decided to install three benches on each platform. The line transported 19,800 people on Day 3, operating a total of 64 trips. In the first week of operations (2–8 February 2014), the monorail transported 1,36,865 passengers in about 512 trips, earning a total revenue of ₹14,24,810. A total of 1,32,523 tokens and 1409 smart cards were also sold during the first week. Between 8–15 February 142,410 commuters travelled across the corridor in over 521 trips, earning the monorail a total revenue of ₹27,95,115. More than 500 smart cards were sold in the second week itself. Ridership dropped 18% in the third week compared to the first week. About 1.12 lakh passengers made 475 trips on the monorail, earning a revenue of ₹10.50 lakh. Revenues dropped by over 40% in the fourth week of operations (compared to the first week), as 92,771 rode the monorail. According to the MMRDA, between 2 February and 1 March, a total of 4,58,871 commuters used the monorail, generating a total revenue ₹44,66,522.

Over the next two weeks, 76,590 and 41,405 passengers respectively traveled on the line. The average daily ridership dropped from 20,000 during the first few weeks to 15,000 by March 2014. In the last full week of 8-hour operations (from 6 to 12 April), 65,760 commuters used the monorail. Services began operating for 14-hours daily, beginning 15 April 2014, carrying 15,016 commuters for revenue of ₹1.32 lakh. By the last week of January 2015, the monorail had ferried nearly 51 lakh passengers since it began operations.

Consumption of food and chewing tobacco in the premises above the concourse is prohibited.

According to a passenger survey by the MMRDA, 73% of the monorail commuters are regular users, commuting to their workplace or educational institute. Seventy percent of commuters reached stations on foot. Commuters in the age group of 16–22 years made up 33% of the ridership, and those in the age groups of 23–30 years and 31–58 years made up 29% each.

=== Noise ===
According to studies conducted by the MMRDA during the monorail trial run, the trains produce between 65 and 85 decibels of noise, significantly lower than the 95 decibel noise level of a BEST Bus.

=== Future ===
There have been calls among several experts to extend the Mumbai Monorail Line 1, but there are no specific plans to expand the system.

== See also ==
- Transport in Mumbai
- Mumbai Metro
- Mumbai Water Metro
- Mumbai Suburban Railway
- M-Indicator
