= Guru Tegh Bahadur Nagar monorail station =

Guru Tegh Bahadur Nagar

General information
- Location: Indira Nagar, Sion, Mumbai
- Coordinates: 19.036783°N 72.870820°E
- System: monorail station
- Owner: Mumbai Metropolitan Region Development Authority (MMRDA)
- Line: Line 1
- Tracks: 2
- Connections: Harbour Guru Tegh Bahadur Nagar

Construction
- Structure type: Elevated
- Parking: No
- Cycle facilities: No

History
- Opened: 3 March 2019; 7 years ago

Passengers
- 2019: 1000 daily

Services
Preceding station	Mumbai Monorail	Following station
Wadala Depot towards Chembur	Line 1	Antop Hill towards Sant Gadge Maharaj Chowk
Route map
- Sources: Google Maps
Location
- Location within Mumbai

Guru Tegh Bahadur Nagar is a monorail station on Line 1 of the Mumbai Monorail, in Indira Nagar in the Sion suburb of Mumbai, India. It is located on the Truck Terminal Road which is near Wadala Truck Terminal.

Guru Tegh Bahadur Nagar Monorail station connects with Guru Tegh Bahadur Nagar railway station with a distance of 800m.
