= Chembur railway station =

Railway station in Maharashtra, India

Chembur

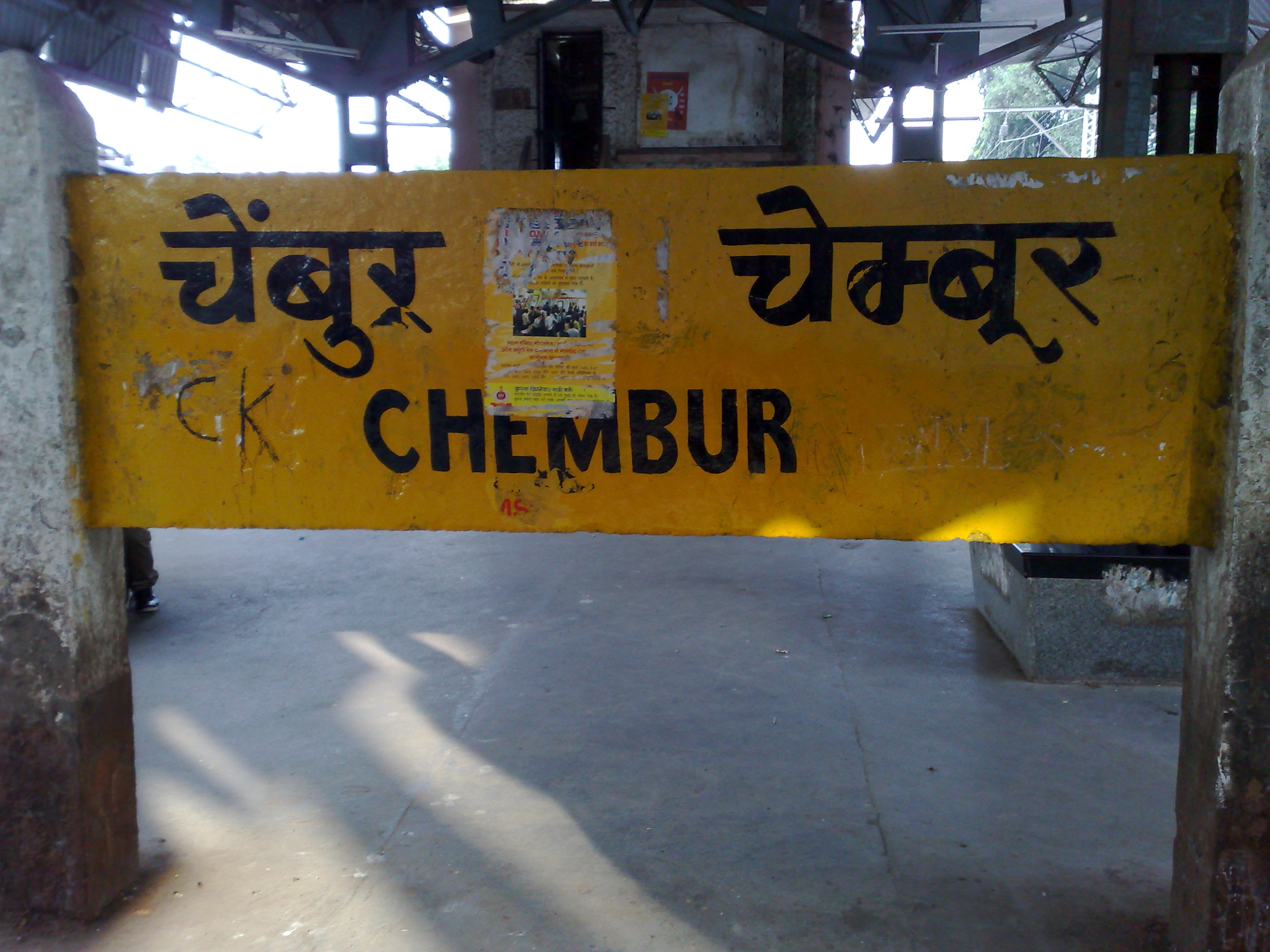

General information
- Coordinates: 19°3′47″N 72°54′2″E
- System: Mumbai Suburban Railway station
- Owner: Ministry of Railways, Indian Railways
- Line: Harbour Line
- Platforms: 2
- Tracks: 2
- Connections: Chembur; Yellow Line Chembur

Construction
- Structure type: Standard on-ground station
- Parking: No
- Cycle facilities: No

Other information
- Status: Active
- Station code: CM (suburban); CMBR (mainline)
- Fare zone: Central Railway zone

History
- Opened: 1906

Passengers
- 2012-13: 1,73,788

Services
Preceding station	Mumbai Suburban Railway	Following station
Tilak Nagar towards Chhatrapati Shivaji Terminus	Harbour line	Govandi towards Panvel
Preceding station	Mumbai Metro	Following station
Out-of-system interchange
Deshbhakt N.G. Acharya Udyan-Diamond Garden, Chembur towards Mandale	Line 2B transfer at Chembur	Eastern Express Highway towards Andheri (West)
Preceding station	Mumbai Monorail	Following station
Terminus	Line 1 transfer at Chembur	VNP and RC Marg towards Sant Gadge Maharaj Chowk
Route map
Location
- Location within Mumbai

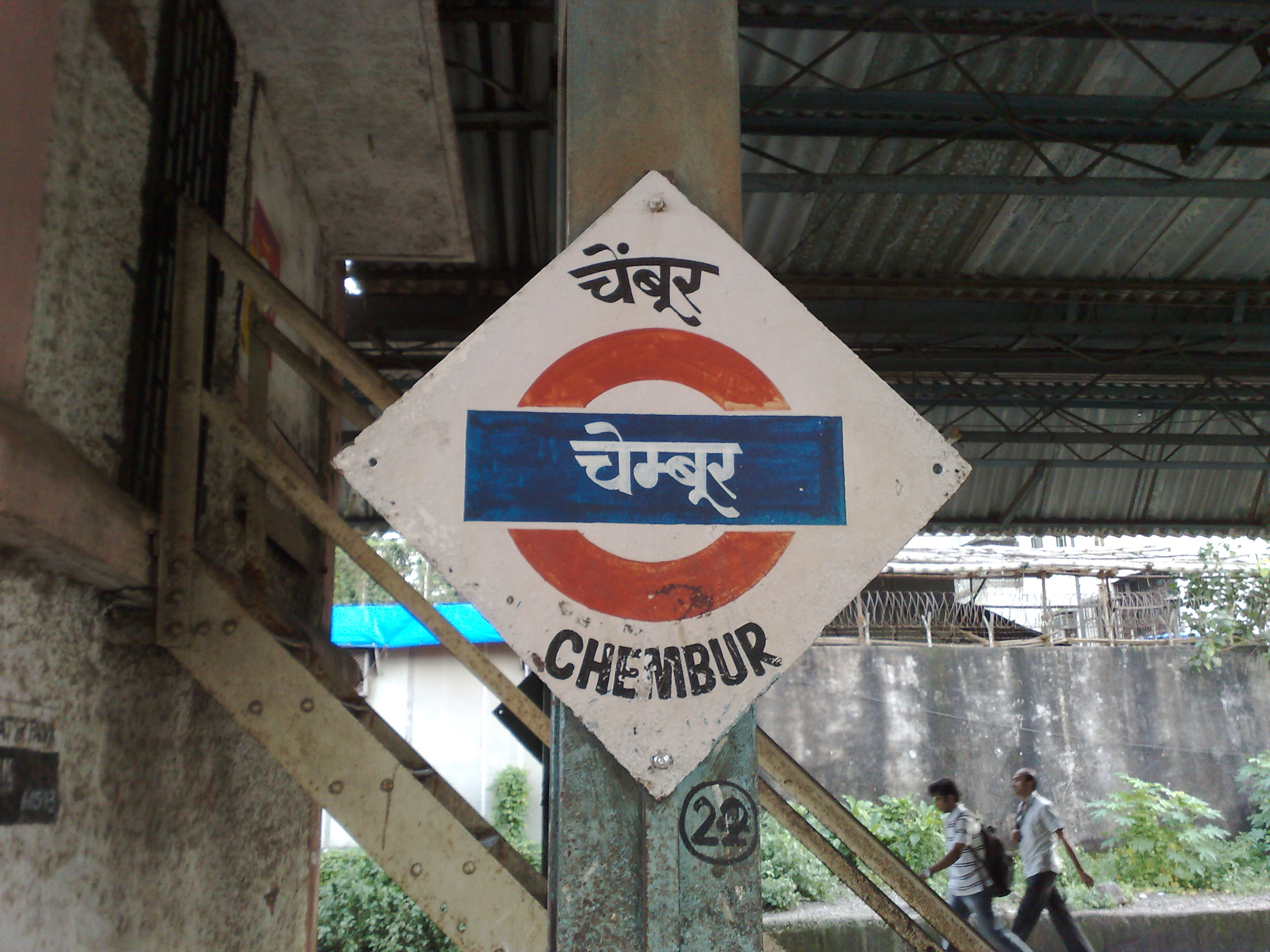
Chembur Platform Board

Chembur Station is a railway station in Chembur on the Harbour Line of the Mumbai Suburban Railway network. It lies near Chembur Market. It has one train in the morning starting from this station. It has two platforms which serves North and South bound railway line.

The Chembur Monorail Station is connected with a skywalk to the Chembur Railway Station.

== History ==
The Kurla–Chembur single line was built in 1906 for garbage trains. It was opened to passenger traffic in the year 1924. The Kurla–Mankhurd section which also contained Chembur was electrified in 1950 and suburban steam services were run on one track from 1951.

== Access ==
The station provides noise indicators for the blind to help them spot where their compartment comes in. It does not have ramp for the disabled. The Station Master's Office has the First Aid Box. The station can be reached by road on both East and West side.
