= Lower Parel monorail station =

Monorail station in Mumbai, India

Lower Parel
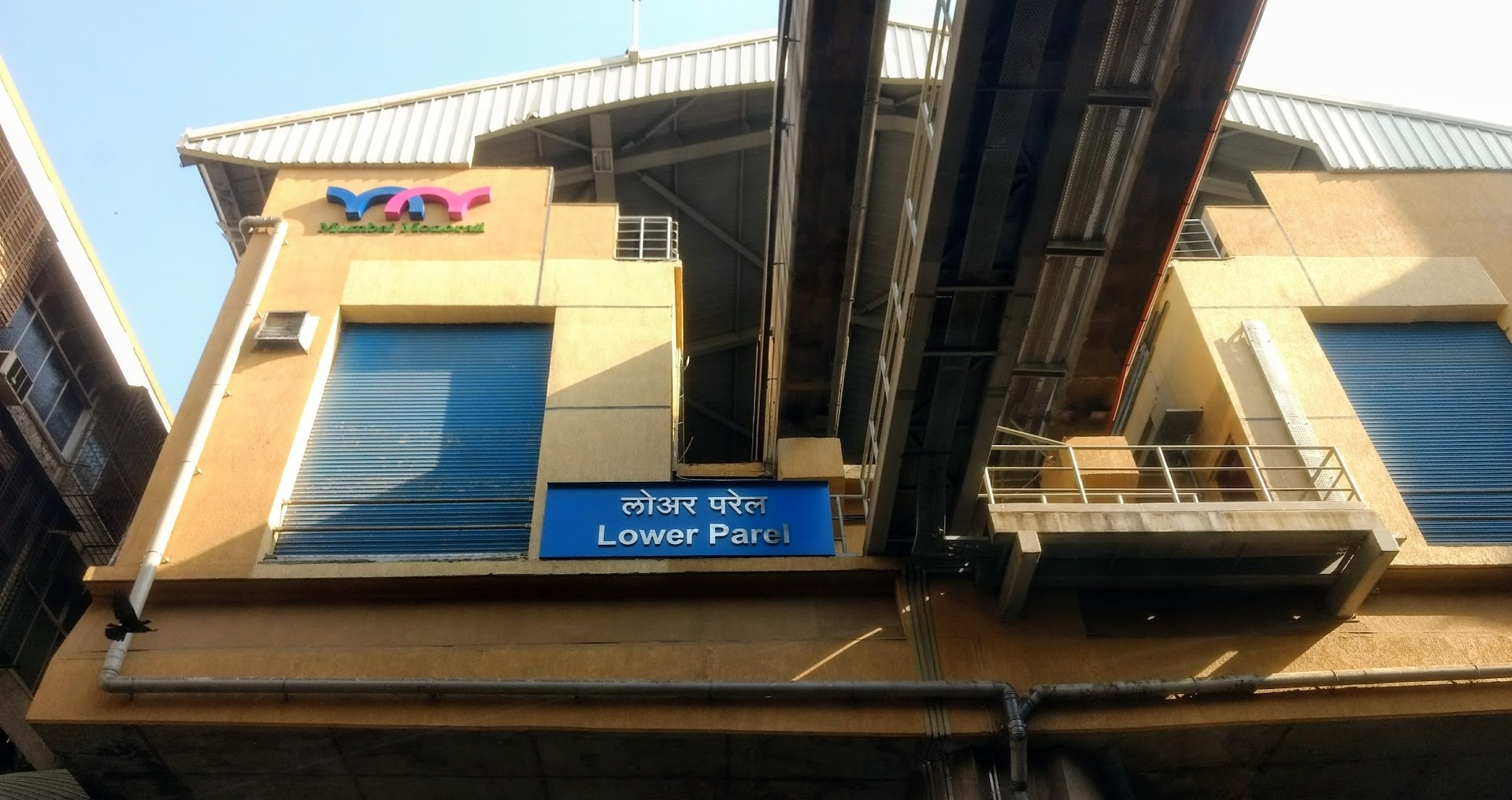
- Station exterior

General information
- Location: NM Joshi Marg, BDD Chawl, Lower Parel, Mumbai, Maharashtra 400012
- Coordinates: 18°59′35″N 72°49′53″E
- System: Mumbai Monorail station
- Owner: MMRDA
- Operator: Maha Mumbai Metro Operation Corp. Ltd (MMMOCL)
- Platforms: 2
- Tracks: 2
- Connections: Western Lower Parel

Construction
- Structure type: Elevated
- Platform levels: 1
- Parking: No
- Cycle facilities: No

History
- Opened: 3 March 2019; 7 years ago

Passengers
- 2019: 1000 daily

Services
Preceding station	Mumbai Monorail	Following station
Mint Colony towards Chembur	Line 1	Sant Gadge Maharaj Chowk Terminus
Route map
- Sources: Google Maps
Location
- Location within Mumbai

Lower Parel is a monorail station of Mumbai Monorail located in the Lower Parel suburb of Mumbai, India. Lies on the NM Joshi Marg. It lies to the West of Lalbaug area of South Central Mumbai.

Lower Parel monorail station connects with Lower Parel railway station is of 300m far.
