= Spenta Multimedia =

Indian publishing house

Spenta Multimedia Pvt. Ltd.
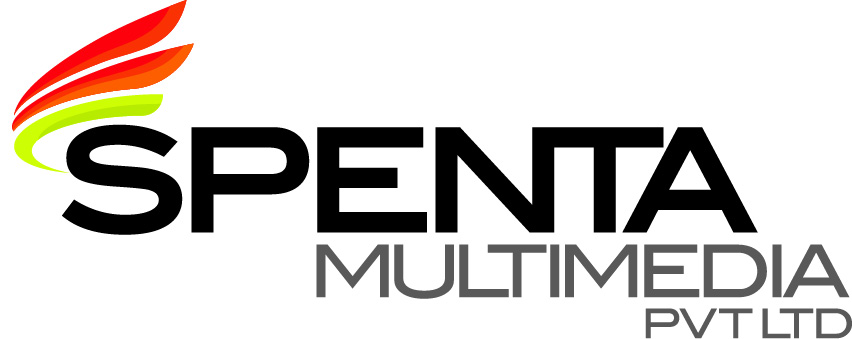
- Company type: Private
- Industry: Printing, Publishing, Content Generation, Event management and Digital marketing
- Founded: 1995 by Maneck Davar
- Headquarters: Mumbai, Lower Parel Todi Mills 400013
- Key people: Maneck Davar, Chairman & Managing Director
- Number of employees: 300
- Website: www.spentamultimedia.com

Spenta Multimedia is a publishing house that undertakes assignments in the field of Content Generation with Design, Event Management, Commercial Printing, Digital Publishing and Web Design.

== History ==
Spenta Multimedia was founded by Maneck Davar in the year 1995. He contributed to The Indian Express newspaper and he was a part of the campaign against Reliance Industries along with Ramnath Goenka. Davar is also known from printing and publishing the Bi-monthly Magazine called 'Liquid magazine'. Spenta Multimedia acquired The 'Mumbai Boat Show' and Blue Water Publications in September 2009.

The company's printing press is located at Ambernath, Mumbai. Spenta Multimedia established its digital arm of business to undertake online initiatives in May 2008 and was referred to as Spenta Multimedia Online. In May 2015, the digital arm of the company was registered as Spenta Digital Pvt. Ltd. The office is situated in Lower Parel, Mumbai.

== Awards and recognition ==
The company received several awards such as Consumer Magazine Printer Of The Year in 2012, and the 'International Property Awards Asia Pacific' in 2013 for building the Wadhwa Group realty website. On 24 July 2015, Spenta Multimedia bagged the CMO Asia Real Estate Excellence Award for designing the LNT Realty website as the Most Admired Real Estate Website of the Year 2015.
