= VNP and RC Marg Junction monorail station =

VNP & RC Marg Jn

General information
- Coordinates: 19.052700°N 72.894199°E
- System: Monorail station
- Owner: Mumbai Metropolitan Region Development Authority
- Operator: MMRDA
- Line: Line 1
- Tracks: 2

Construction
- Structure type: Elevated
- Parking: No
- Cycle facilities: No

History
- Opened: 2 February 2014; 12 years ago

Passengers
- 2014: 700 daily

Services
Preceding station	Mumbai Monorail	Following station
Chembur Terminus	Line 1	Fertiliser Township towards Sant Gadge Maharaj Chowk
Route map
- Sources: Google Maps
Location
- Location within Mumbai

VNP and RC Marg Junction is a monorail station on Line 1 of the Mumbai Monorail. It was opened to the public on 2 February 2014, as part of the first phase of Line 1. It is located at the Busy Chembur Naka, which will in future also serve connectivity to Yellow line of Mumbai Metro.
