= Mahalaxmi railway station =

Railway Station in Maharashtra, India

Mahalaxmi

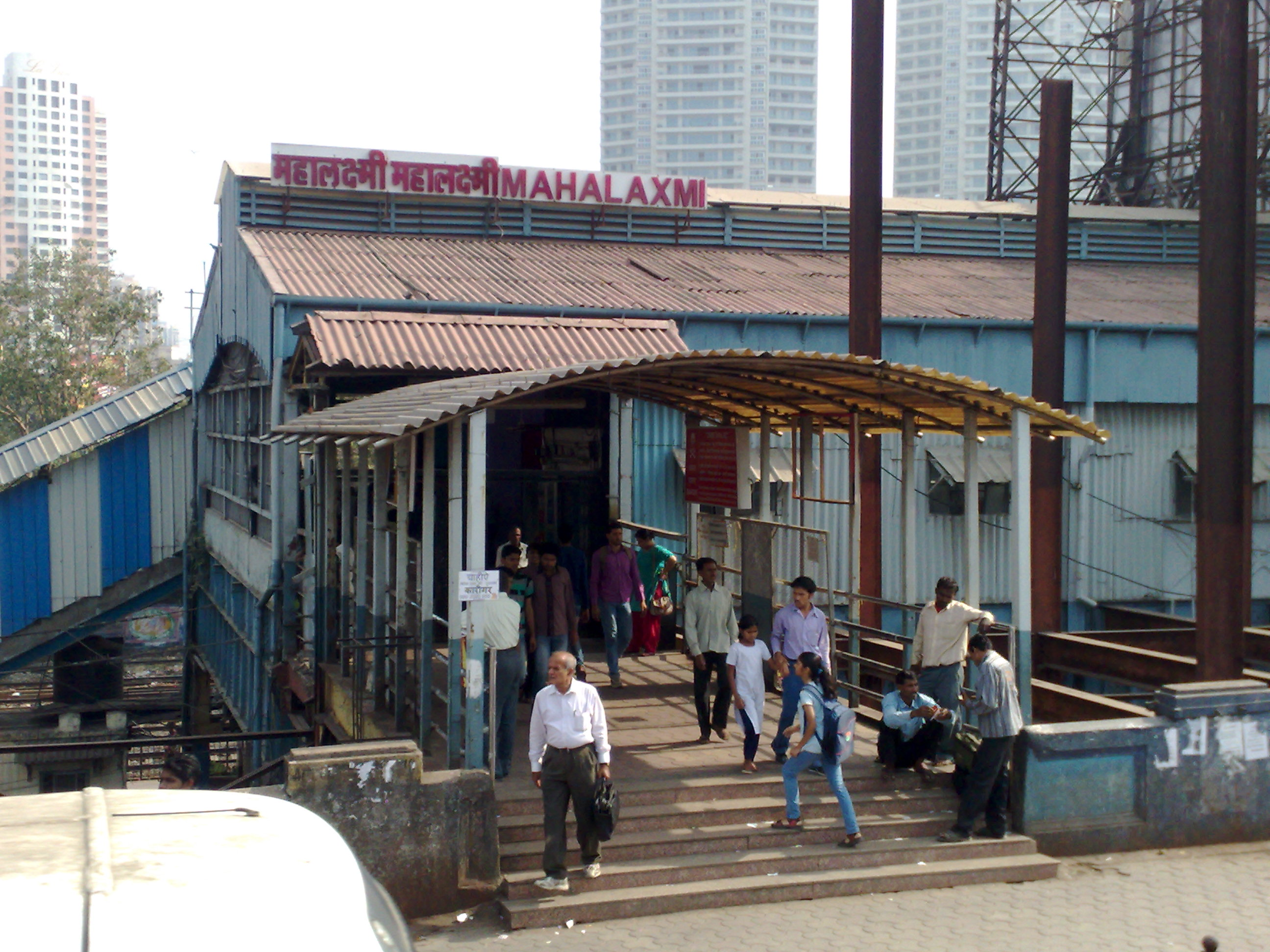
- Mahalaxmi railway station western entrance

General information
- Coordinates: 18.9825°N 72.82417°E
- System: Mumbai Suburban Railway station
- Owner: Ministry of Railways, Indian Railways
- Line: Western Line
- Connections: Sant Gadge Maharaj Chowk; Line 3 Mahalaxmi

Construction
- Structure type: Standard on-ground station
- Parking: No
- Cycle facilities: No

Other information
- Status: Active
- Station code: MX
- Fare zone: Western Railways

History
- Opened: 1884
- Rebuilt: 1926

Services
| Preceding station | Mumbai Suburban Railway | Following station |
|---|---|---|
| Mumbai Central towards Churchgate | Western line | Lower Parel towards Dahanu Road |
Route map
Location
- Location within Mumbai

Mahalaxmi (Pronunciation: [məɦaːləkʂmiː]; station code: MX), also spelled Mahalakshmi, is a railway station on the Western Line of the Mumbai Suburban Railway in Mahalaxmi, Mumbai, in Indian state of Maharashtra. Trains starting from Churchgate pass through Mahalaxmi. The next station south is Mumbai Central Station, while the next station north is Lower Parel Station. Major landmarks in the area are the Mahalaxmi Temple, Haji Ali Dargah, Nehru Planetarium and Mahalaxmi Racecourse Dabbawalla Statue. Worli Seaface is also close from here. Byculla station on the Central Line is located nearby.

The Saat Rasta Project will connect the Mahalaxmi railway station to the proposed Jacob Circle monorail station.The Haji Ali Mahalaxmi Project aims to connect the 225-acre Mahalaxmi Racecourse to the Arabian Sea, by creating a 6-acre public open space.

== History ==
Until the 1920s, the station had just been a siding to transport refuse. In view of the expected weekend crowds for the races at the nearby Race Course, the station had to be redeveloped. Renovation was carried out in 1926, and the station was reopened on 3 October 1926. The station then received am overbridge, a 150 ft (45.72 m) long platform dedicated for races, and 300 ft (91.44 m) long island platforms as well. On 5 January 1928, the Mahalaxmi station welcomed guests for the ceremony for the electrification of the BB&CI Line. The then Governor of Bombay, Sir Leslie Orme Wilson, opened the line to public from the station, in front of 700 invitees. He traveled on the inaugural train till Andheri.

A workshop was established at Mahalaxmi in 1910 for the repair of wagons. In 1962 it was modified to work on carriages, and in 1976 it was adapted for Periodic Overhauls of EMUs.

== Gallery ==
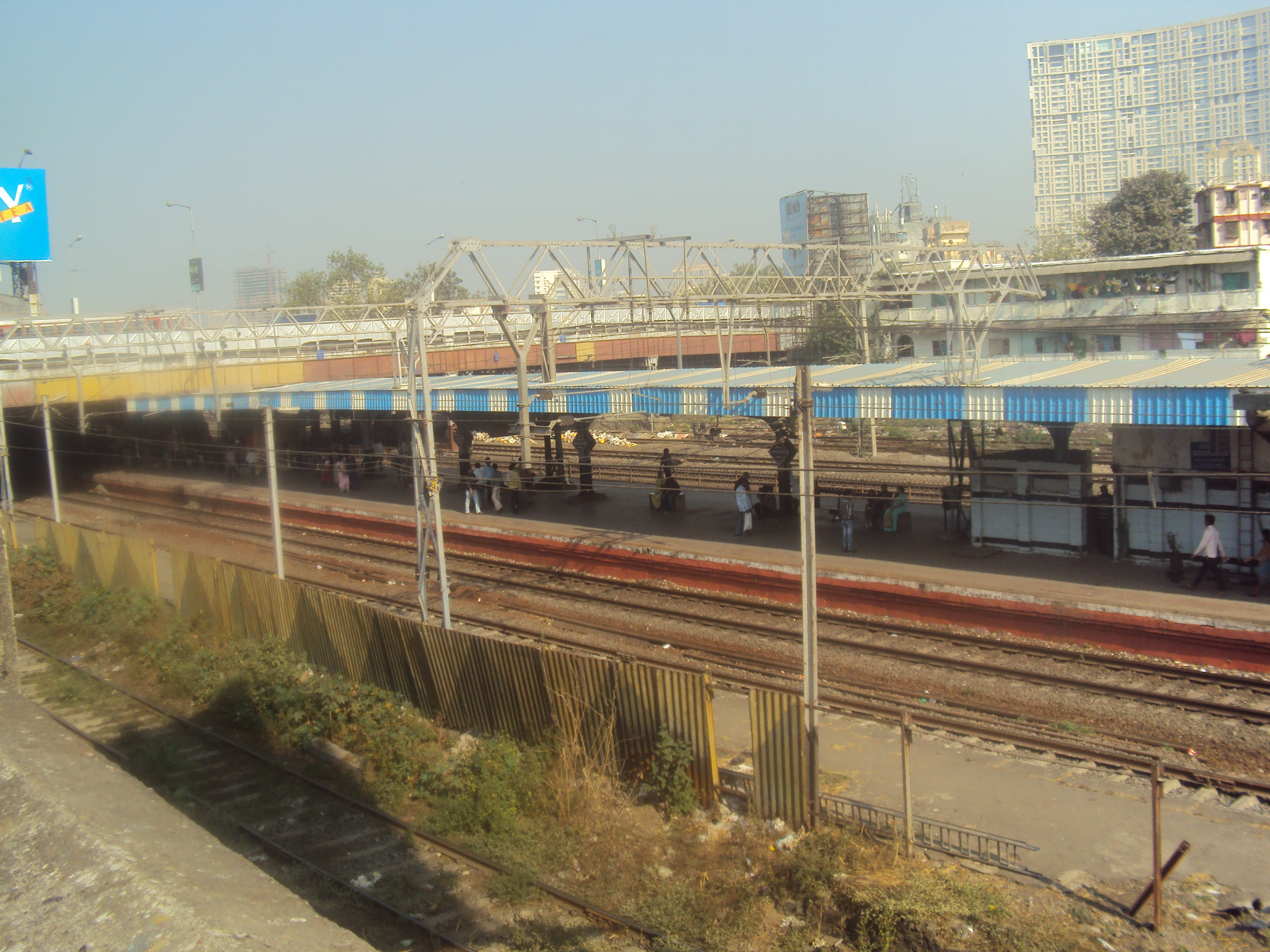
Mahalaxmi railway station platform

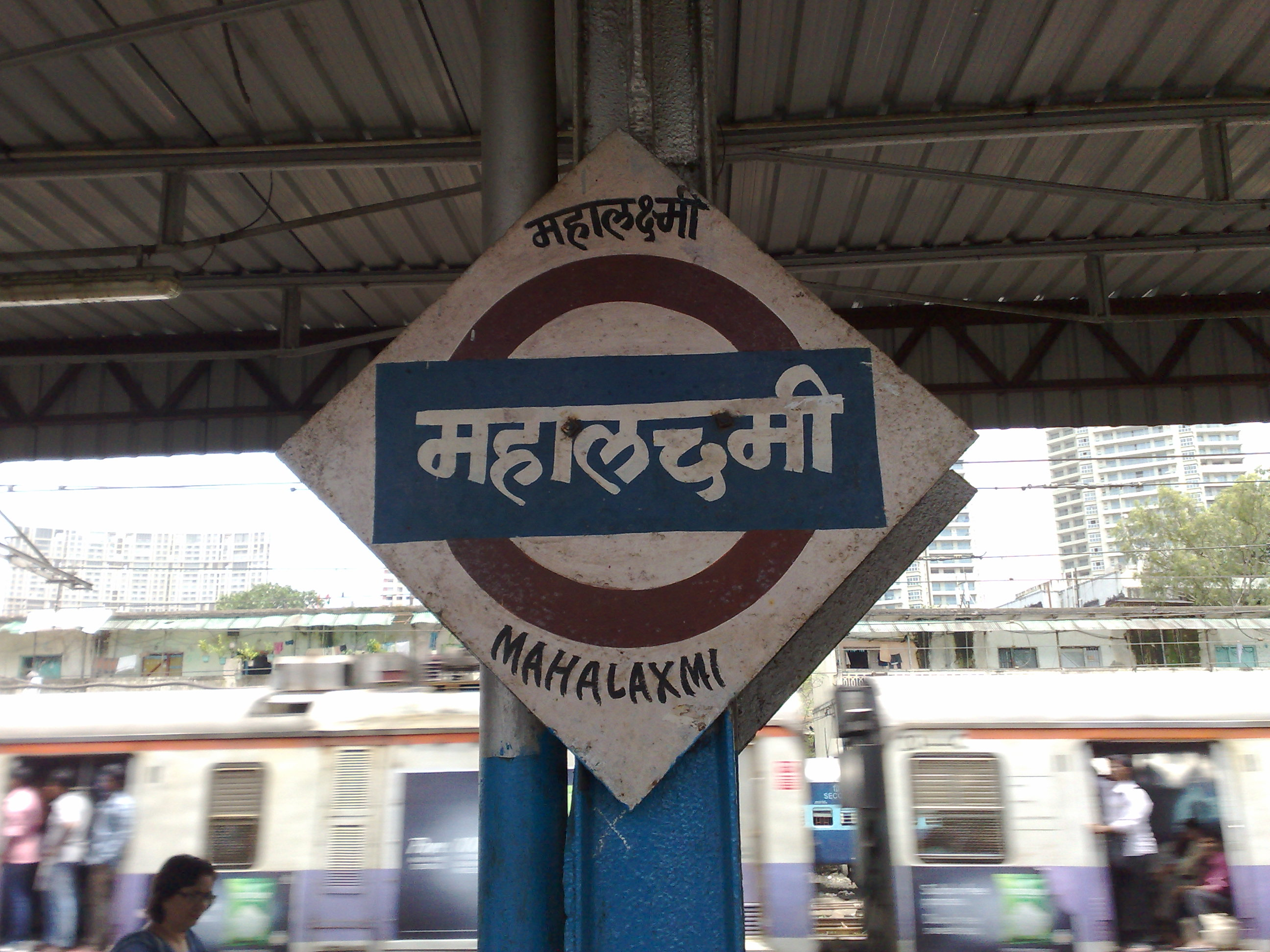
Mahalaxmi Station platformboard

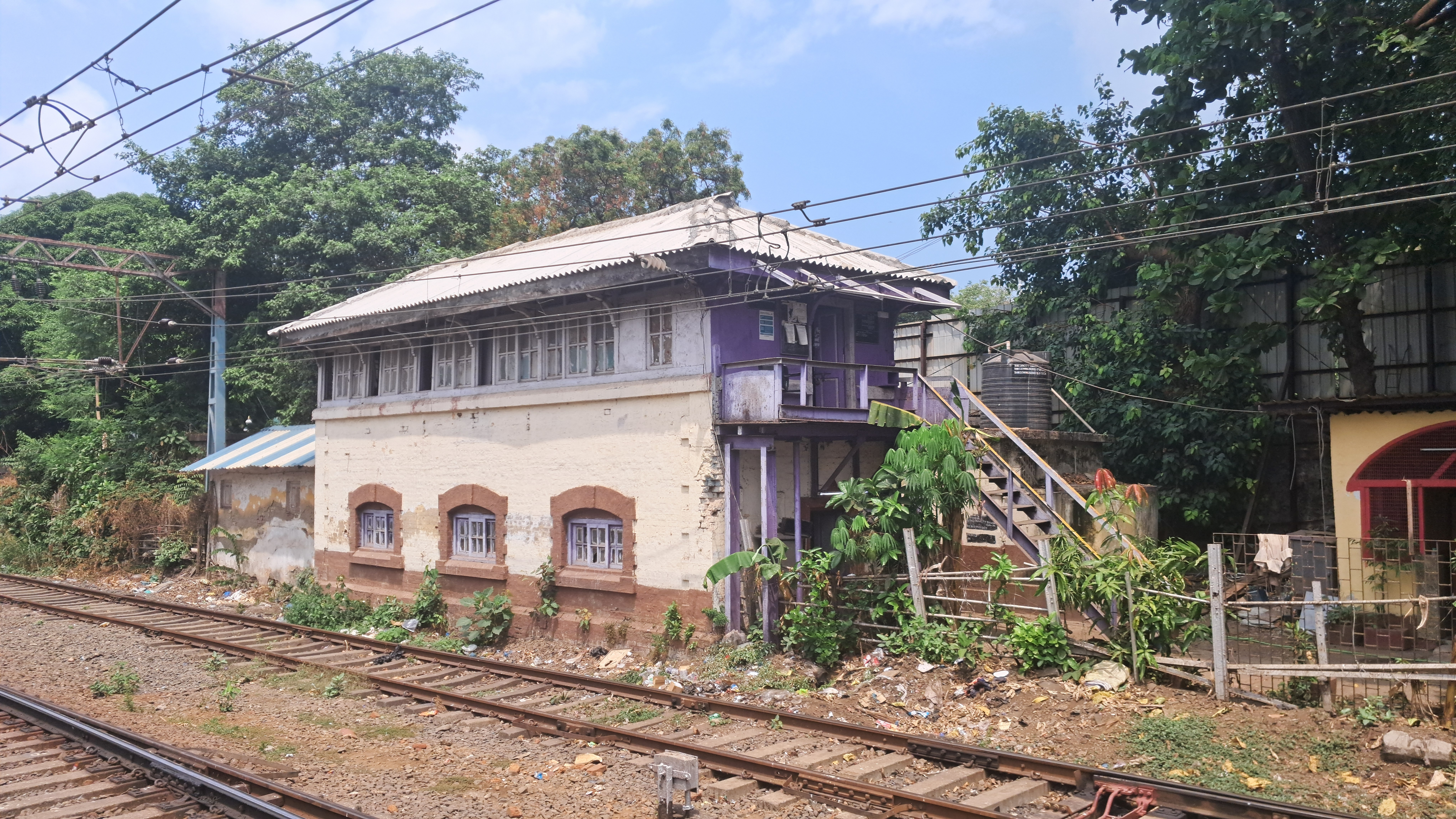
Old Signal Cabin near Mahalaxmi Railway Station

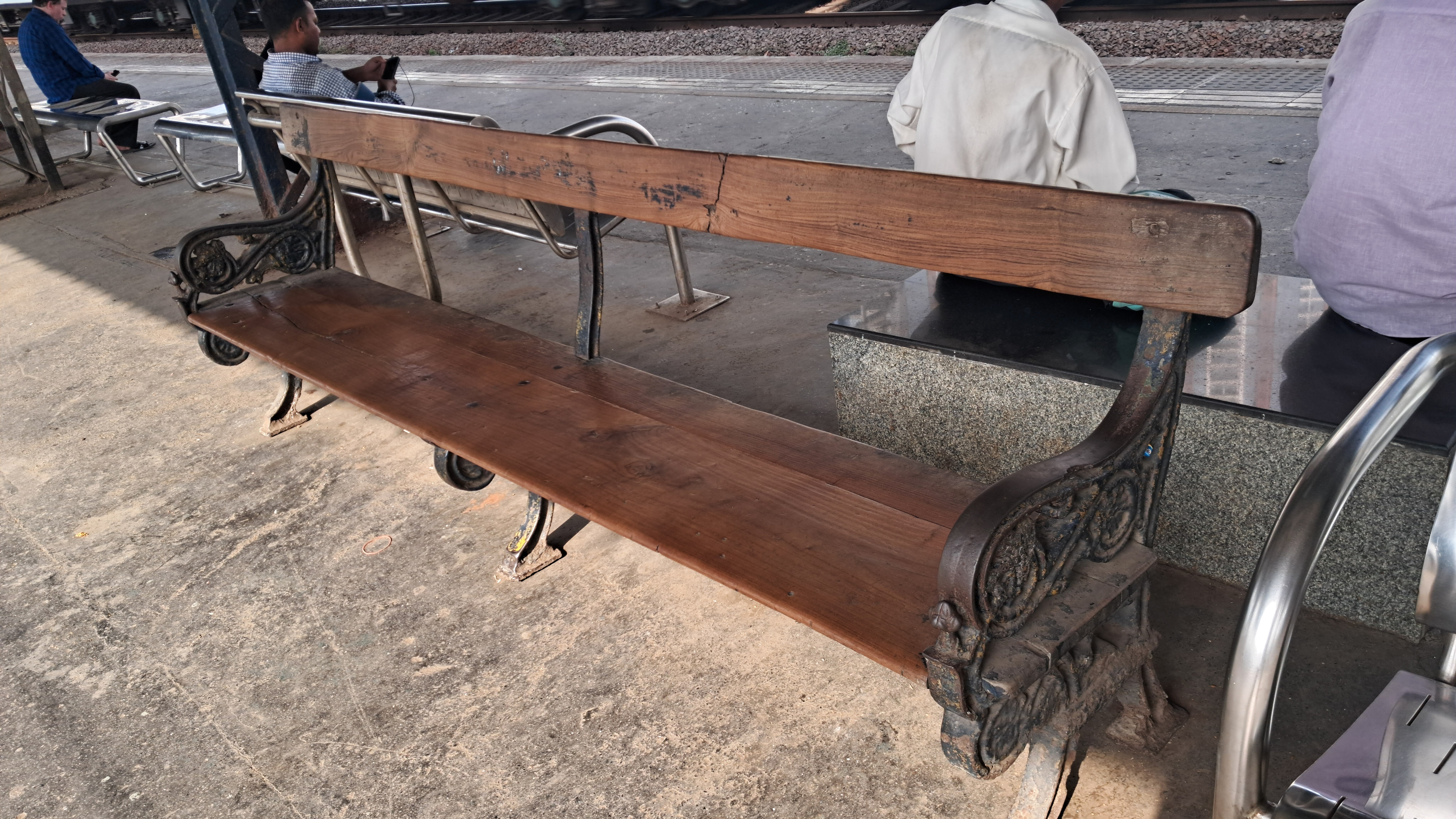
Old Wooden benches at Mahalaxmi Railway Station
