= Tilak Nagar railway station =

Railway Station in Maharashtra, India

Tilak Nagar

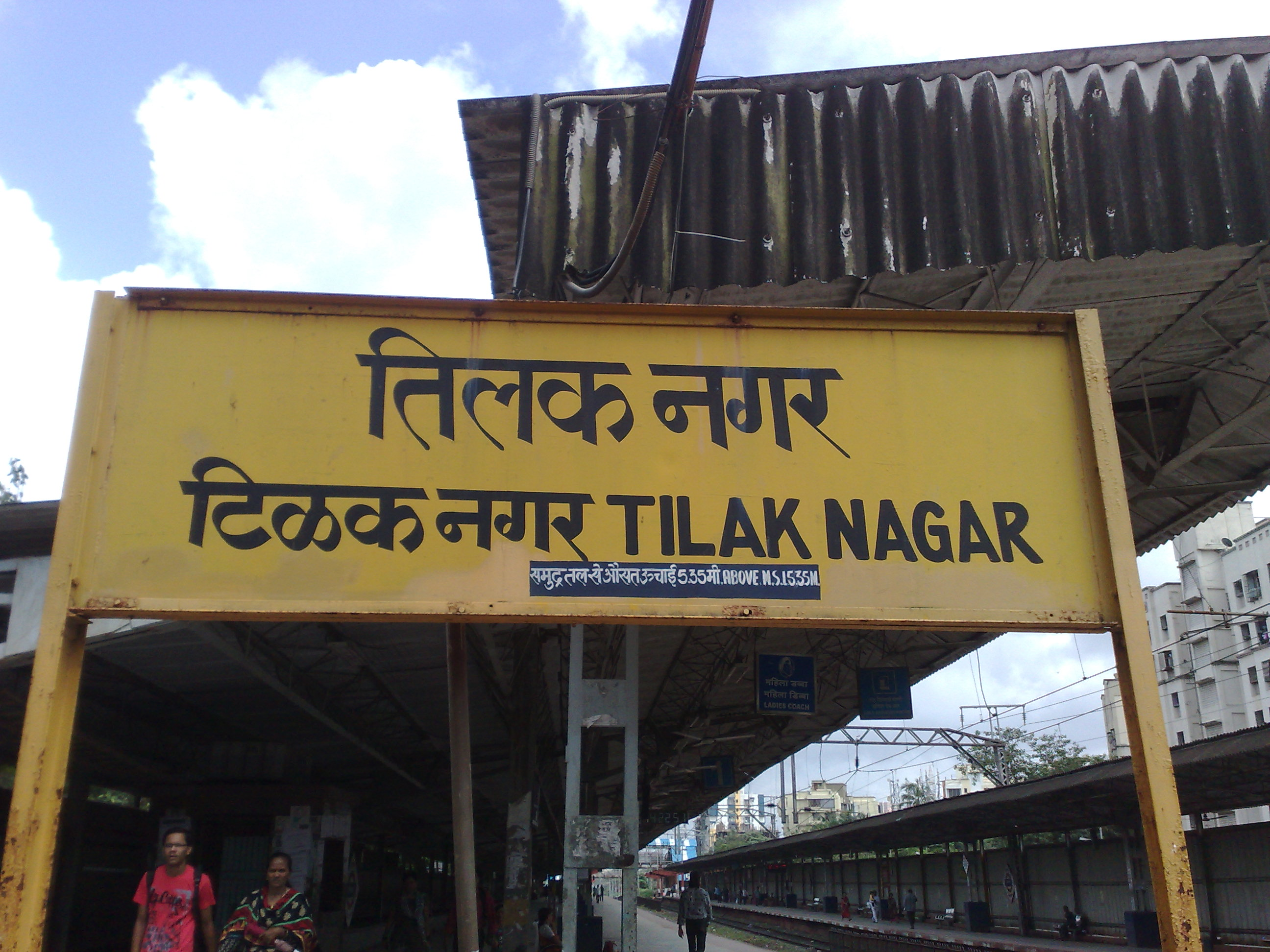

General information
- Coordinates: 19.0658°N 72.8899°E
- Elevation: 5.350 metres (17.55 ft)
- System: Mumbai Suburban Railway station
- Owner: Ministry of Railways, Indian Railways
- Line: Harbour Line
- Platforms: 2
- Tracks: 2

Construction
- Structure type: Standard on-ground station

Other information
- Status: Active
- Station code: TKNG
- Fare zone: Central Railways

Services
Preceding station	Mumbai Suburban Railway	Following station
Kurla towards Chhatrapati Shivaji Terminus	Harbour line	Chembur towards Panvel
Route map
Location
- Location within Mumbai

Tilak Nagar is a railway station on the Harbour Line of the Mumbai Suburban Railway network. It has two platforms which serves North and South bound railway line. The line North goes to the Chembur Railway Station while the line South goes to Kurla Railway Station.

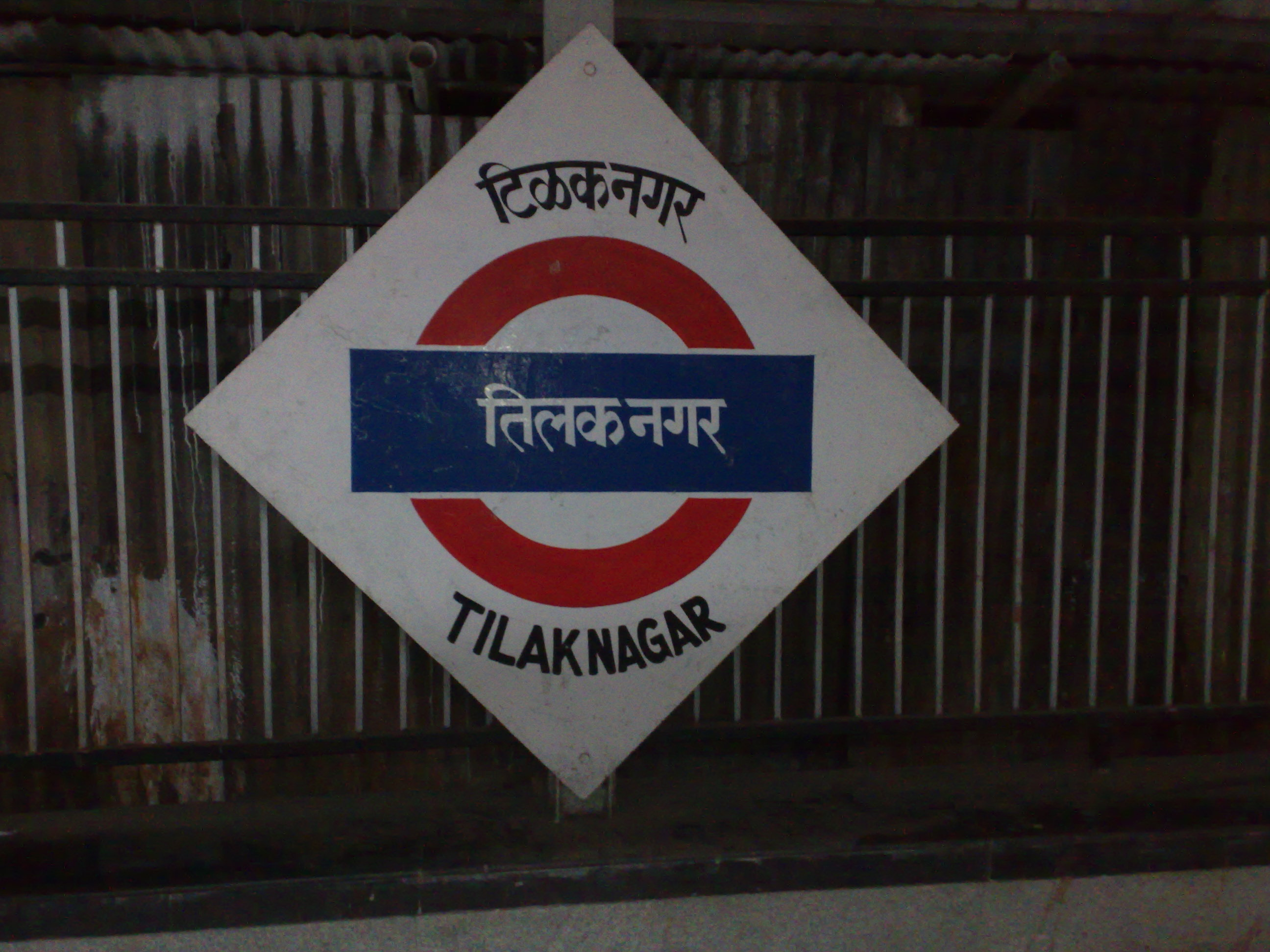
Tilak Nagar Platformboard
