= Goolpur Talbani railway station =

Railway station in Pakistan

General information
- Coordinates: 29.6027°N 72.3278°E
- Owner: Ministry of Railways

Other information
- Station code: GTB

History
- Former names: Great Indian Peninsula Railway
Location

Goolpur Talbani railway station (Urdu: گولپور طالبانی ریلوے اسٹیشن) is located in Pakistan.

== See also ==
- List of railway stations in Pakistan
- Pakistan Railways
