= Bengaluru Monorail =

Rapid transit monorail system

Overview
- Locale: Bengaluru, Karnataka
- Transit type: straddle-beam Monorail

Technical
- System length: 41.3 kilometres (25.7 mi)

Bengaluru Monorail was a rapid transit monorail system proposed for the city of Bengaluru, India.

In 2012 the government was advised light rail was a better option.

== History ==
The State government appointed Capita Symonds, a UK-based consultancy firm, to suggest the best feeder rail network for Bengaluru. Capita Symonds stated that Light Rail Transit (LRT) was more advantageous than monorail.

The Bangalore Airport Rail Link (BARL) Ltd is the nodal agency for implementing the project.

In 2017, the Bengaluru Development Minister stated that the monorail system was still in the proposal phase.

== Network ==
Terminals		Length (km)
JP Nagar	Hebbal	31.3
Peripheral Ring Road	Magadi Road Toll Gate	10

== See also ==
- Namma Metro
- Bengaluru Commuter Rail
- Bangalore
