= Govandi railway station =

Railway station in Mumbai, Maharashtra, India

Govandi

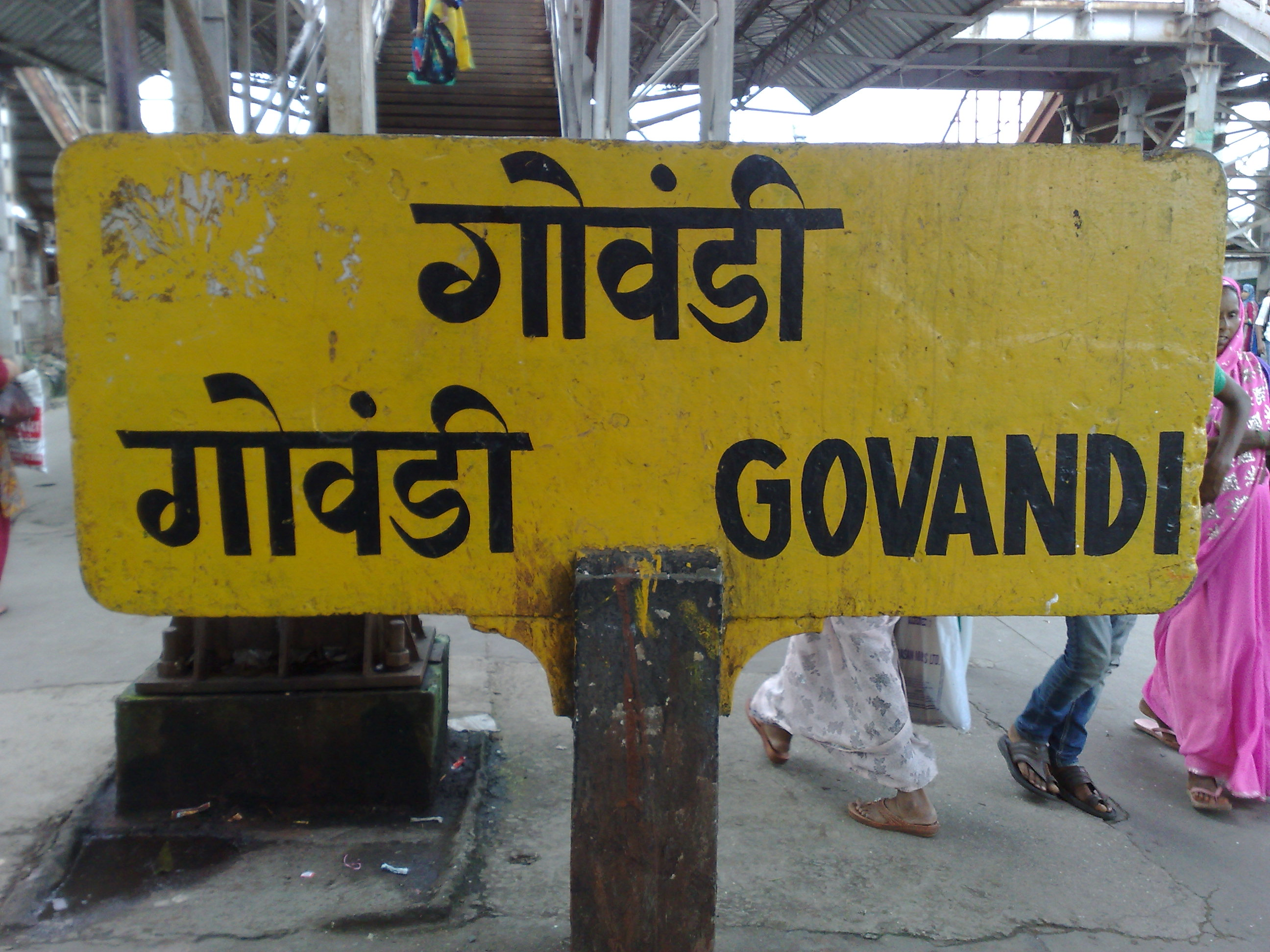

General information
- Coordinates: 19.0550°N 72.9156°E
- System: Mumbai Suburban Railway station
- Owner: Ministry of Railways, Indian Railways
- Line: Harbour Line
- Platforms: 2
- Tracks: 2

Construction
- Structure type: Standard on-ground station
- Parking: No Parking

Other information
- Status: Active
- Station code: GV
- Fare zone: Central Railway zone

Passengers
- 2012-13: 1,32,961

Services
Preceding station	Mumbai Suburban Railway	Following station
Chembur towards Chhatrapati Shivaji Terminus	Harbour line	Mankhurd towards Panvel
Route map
Harbour line
Location
- Location within India Location within Maharashtra Location within Mumbai

Govandi is a railway station in Govandi East, on the Harbour Line of the Mumbai Suburban Railway network in the Central Railways zone. The station code is GV.

It has two platforms. One serves the line north to the Mankhurd railway station, while the others serves the southbound line to Chembur Railway Station.

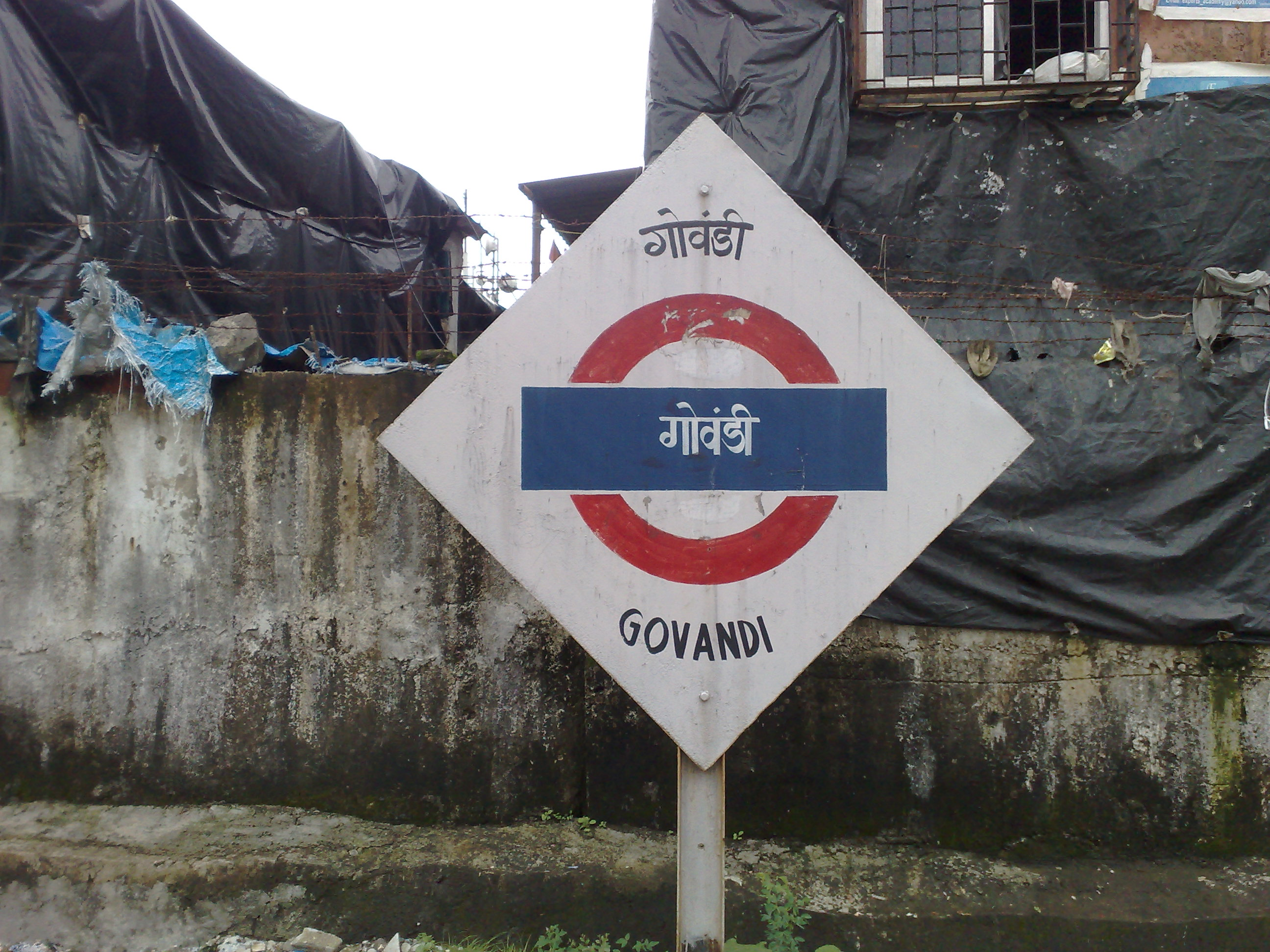
Govandi platformboard
