= Dadar Parsi Colony =

Mancherji Joshi Parsi Colony Dadar दादर पारसी कॉलनी Mancherji Joshi Parsi Colony
- Neighbourhood
- Nickname: Parsi Colony
- Location in Mumbai, India
- Coordinates: 19.0203°N 72.8538°E
- Country: India
- State: Maharashtra
- District: Mumbai City
- City: Mumbai
- Ward: F North

Government
  - Type: Municipal Corporation
  - Body: Brihanmumbai Municipal Corporation (MCGM)
- Elevation: 13 m (43 ft)

Languages
  - Official: Marathi
- Time zone: UTC+5:30 (IST)
- PIN: 400014, 400019
- Area code: 022
- Civic agency: BMC

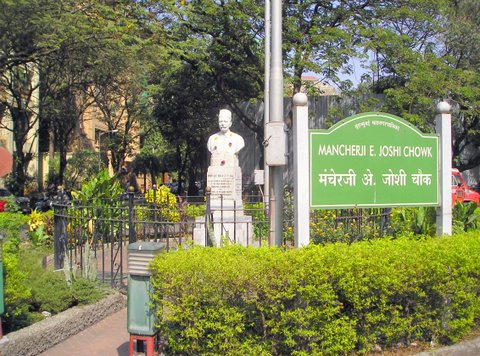
Commemorative statue of M Joshi - Principal Founder

Dadar Parsi Colony (officially Mancherji Joshi Parsi Colony) is an urban planned residential precinct in Mumbai. It is situated in the locality of Dadar. Unlike the other Parsi colonies (also known as 'baugs', literally gardens) it is not surrounded by a wall or fence and is not isolated from its surroundings. The colony houses the famous Five Gardens named in memory of the Principal Founder Mancherji Joshi, a renowned Parsi.

It is the largest Zoroastrian enclave in the world and in 2009, out of the 45,000 Zoroastrians living in Mumbai, 10,000 lived in Dadar Parsi Colony.

== History ==
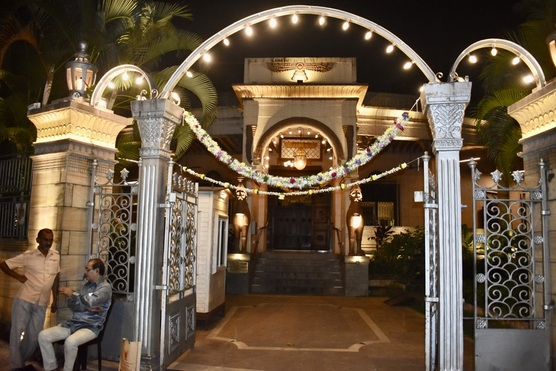
Rustom Faramna Agiary of Parsi Colony Dadar Mumbai

Some housing plots, (when this part of the city was being developed under the efforts of the Bombay Improvement Trust schemes circa 1900’s) was earmarked for Zoroastrians, under the auspices of “ Covenants” through the efforts of Mr Mancherji Edalji Joshi, a then civic employee of the cities Municipal governance, he was later honoured for his efforts by the then Municipal governance, in being named the principal founder of the Dadar Parsi Colony precinct. He was instrumental in facilitating the leasing of plots of land, by Zoroastrians of the day, from the then Municipal governance under the British Raj in India. Most of the buildings built back in the day, were done with a philanthropic and entrepreneurial mindset for the community to be able to reside the way it is in the now.

The area was built by the British under the Dadar-Matunga-Wadala-Sion scheme of 1899-1900, the first planned scheme in Mumbai. The Bombay City Improvement Trust formulated this plan in order to relieve congestion in the centre of the town, following the Mumbai plague epidemics of the 1890s. According to the survey plan, 60,000 people were to be housed at Dadar-Matunga and an equal number in Sion-Matunga. 85,000 people were to be accommodated in the developments in Sewri-Wadala.

The plans regulated constructions with emphasis on proper sanitation. No building was to be more than three storeys high, and the buildings were to have open spaces between them. The land-use was planned to be a mix of residential, commercial and institutional constructions. Parks and gardens were planned, and the streets were well laid out.

440 acres (1.8 km^{2}) of land was procured and leased to the government for selling. For the first time in 1922, housing cooperatives were formed to take advantage of newly developed land. The Parsi and Hindu colonies in Dadar were developed in this way in the 1920s.

Dadar was 6 mi (10 km) away from Crawford Market by the newly constructed Mohammed Ali Road. The tramways were extended here. The GIP constructed a bridge, now the Tilak Bridge, connecting the two railways. Soon, in February 1925, the GIP Railways opened their line, and started the work of electrifying the railways. Among the institutions which moved here according to the BCIP plan were the VJTI, the Sydenham College of Commerce and Wadia Vachha now known as J.B.Vachha high school for Parsi girls.

This residential urban planned precinct in Mumbai is home to an estimated 15,000 civilians, which is by far the largest concentration of Zoroastrians in Mumbai, and possibly the world today.

Zoroastrians is the cultural and sociological term that includes Iranis & Parsi’s as followers of the faith called Zoroastrianism. Originally Persia / Iran being home. The Parsi Colony Dadar is a colloquial reference that is still used to refer to all Zoroastrians residing here. It is a colloquial urban myth that only Zoroastrians do and can reside in the precinct since its inception. Many civilians of other communities also call this precinct their home since many generations.

The M Joshi Parsi Colony geographically lies in Dadar East, it carries the post code 400014. An urban colloquial reference in recent years says that the Parsi Colony Dadar, precinct is part of Matunga 400019, which is not an accurate reference.

== Education ==
The Dadar Parsi Youth Assembly and J.B. Vachha High School and the Dadar Athornan Institute are educational institutions located within the precinct
