= GTB (advertising agency) =

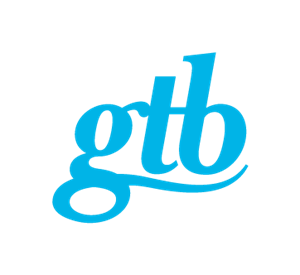
- Industry: Marketing and advertising
- Predecessor: Team Detroit
- Headquarters: Detroit, Michigan, United States
- Area served: Worldwide
- Key people: Robert Guay, CEO
- Parent: WPP plc
- Website: GTB.com

GTB, formerly known as Team Detroit, is an advertising agency based in Detroit, Michigan. It is the primary creative agency for the Ford Motor Company. GTB is a subsidiary of WPP, one of the Big Four advertising firms.

WPP formed Team Detroit in 2006 out of portions of six sibling agencies: J. Walter Thompson (JWT), Young & Rubicam (Y&R), Wunderman, Ogilvy & Mather, MEC, and Mindshare.

In 2016, Team Detroit was rebranded as GTB, originally an acronym for Global Team Blue.
