= Guru Tegh Bahadur Nagar railway station =

Railway station in Mumbai, Maharashtra, India

Guru Tegh Bahadur Nagar Koliwada

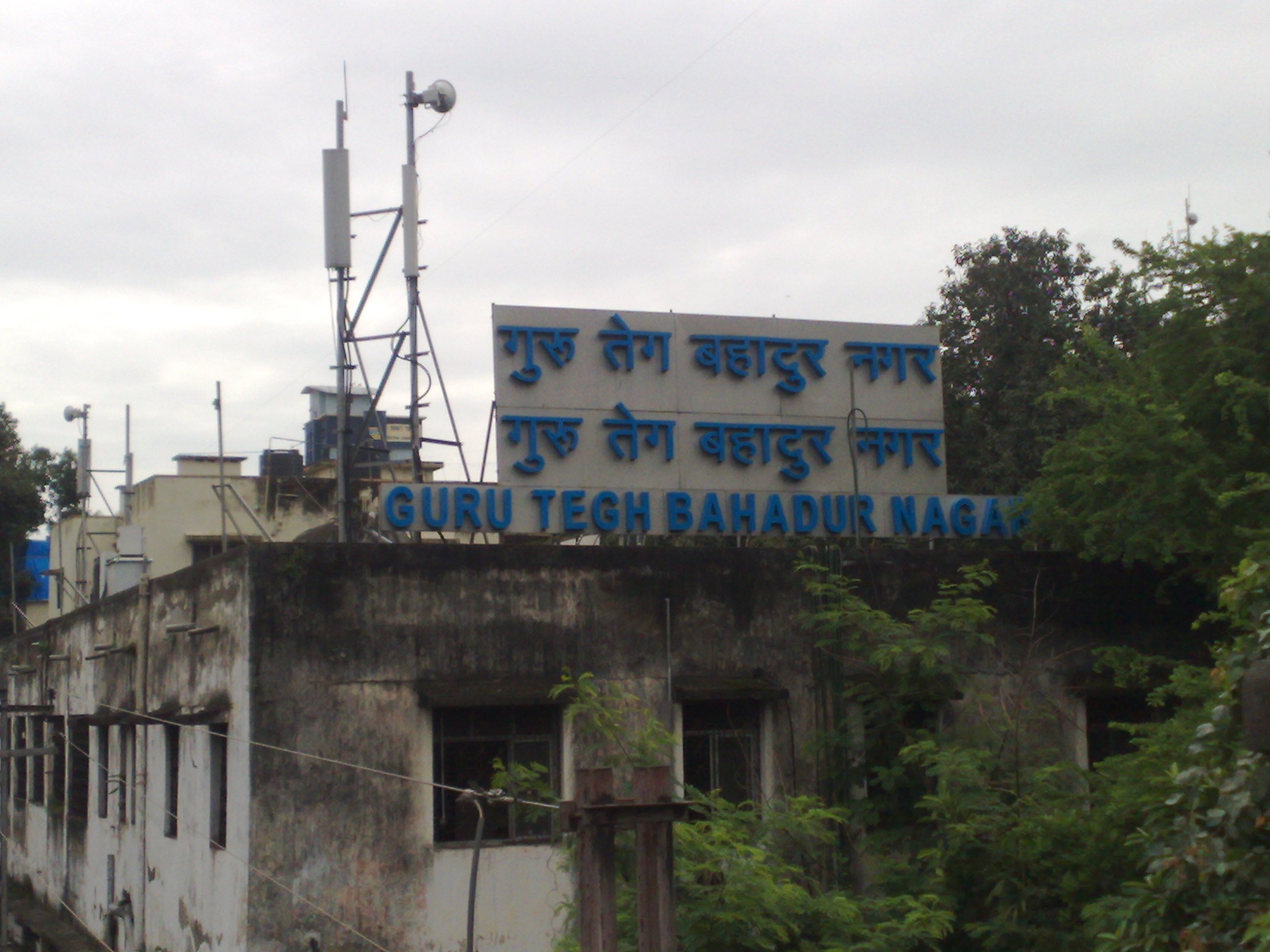

General information
- Coordinates: 19.037728°N 72.864107°E
- Elevation: 5.540 metres (18.18 ft)
- System: Mumbai Suburban Railway station
- Owner: Indian Railways
- Line: Harbour Line
- Platforms: 2
- Tracks: 2
- Connections: Guru Tegh Bahadur Nagar

Construction
- Structure type: Standard on-ground station
- Platform levels: On ground

Other information
- Status: Active
- Station code: GTBN; KWD (former)
- Fare zone: Central Railways

Passengers
- 2012-13: 1,21,102

Services
Preceding station	Mumbai Suburban Railway	Following station
Wadala Road towards Chhatrapati Shivaji Terminus	Harbour line	Chunabhatti towards Panvel
Route map
Location
- Location within India Location within Maharashtra Location within Mumbai

Guru Tegh Bahadur Nagar (formerly Koliwada, station code: GTBN) is a railway station on the Harbour Line of the Mumbai Suburban Railway. It is situated near the King's Circle and Sion local railway stations.

The station was originally called Koliwada railway station. It was renamed Guru Tegh Bahadur Nagar railway station in 1977.
