= Lower Parel railway station =

Railway Station in Maharashtra, India

Lower Parel

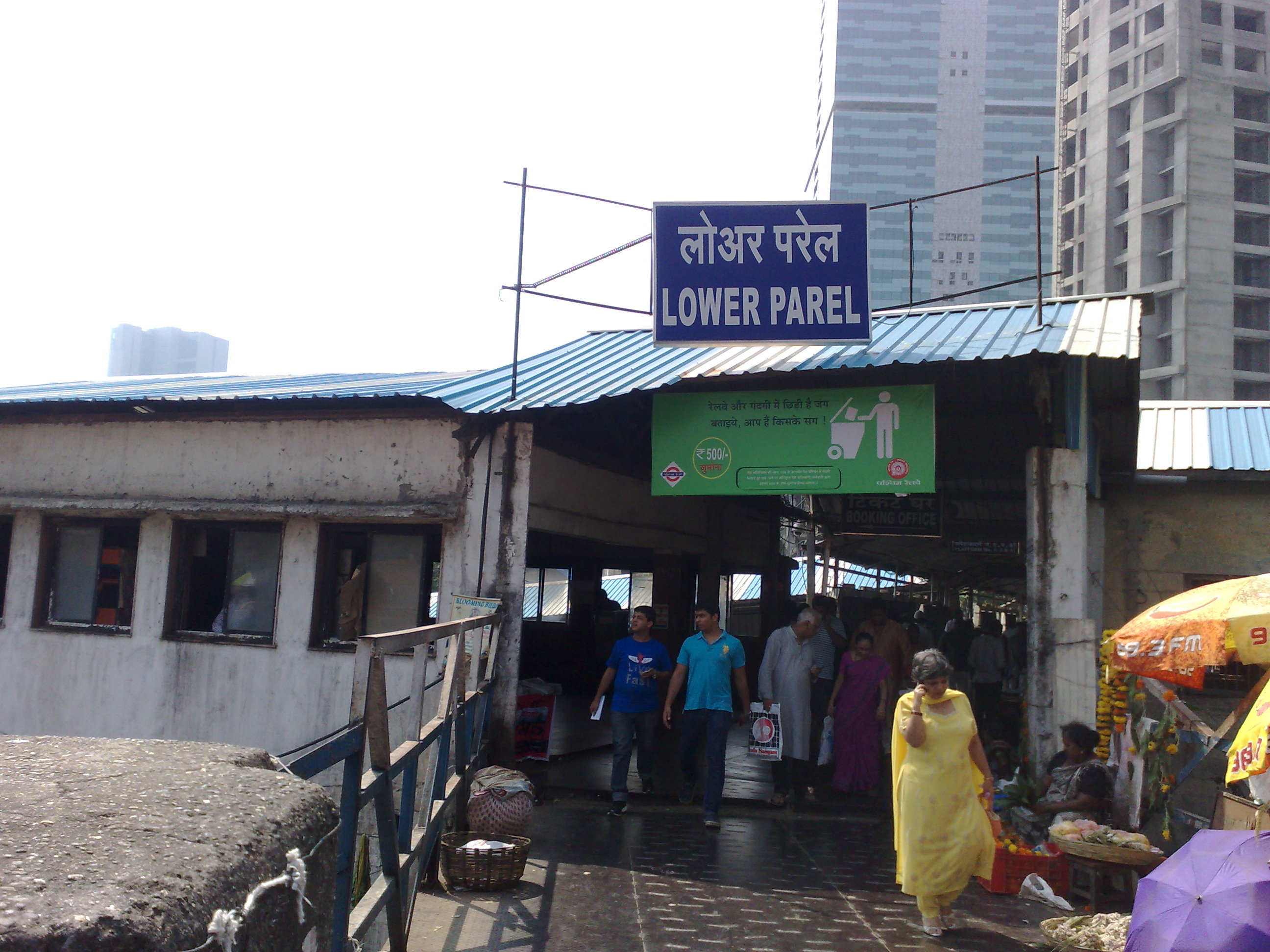

General information
- Coordinates: 18°59′43″N 72°49′48″E
- System: Mumbai Suburban Railway station
- Owner: Ministry of Railways, Indian Railways
- Line: Western Line
- Platforms: 3
- Tracks: 5
- Connections: Lower Parel

Construction
- Structure type: Standard on-ground station

Other information
- Status: Active
- Station code: PL
- Fare zone: Western Railways

Services
Preceding station	Mumbai Suburban Railway	Following station
Mahalaxmi towards Churchgate	Western line	Prabhadevi towards Dahanu Road
Route map
Location
- Location within Mumbai

Lower Parel (Pronunciation: [pəɾəɭ], [pəɾeːl]; station code: PL) is a railway station on the Western Line of the Mumbai Suburban Railway, India. The next station south is Mahalaxmi railway station; the next station north is Prabhadevi.

== Transport ==
It has a connection to phase II of the Mumbai Monorail, opened in 2019.

The Delisle Bridge, which connects to Lower Parel, was shut to traffic in 2018 and reopened in November 2023 after pandemic-caused delays.

== Gallery ==
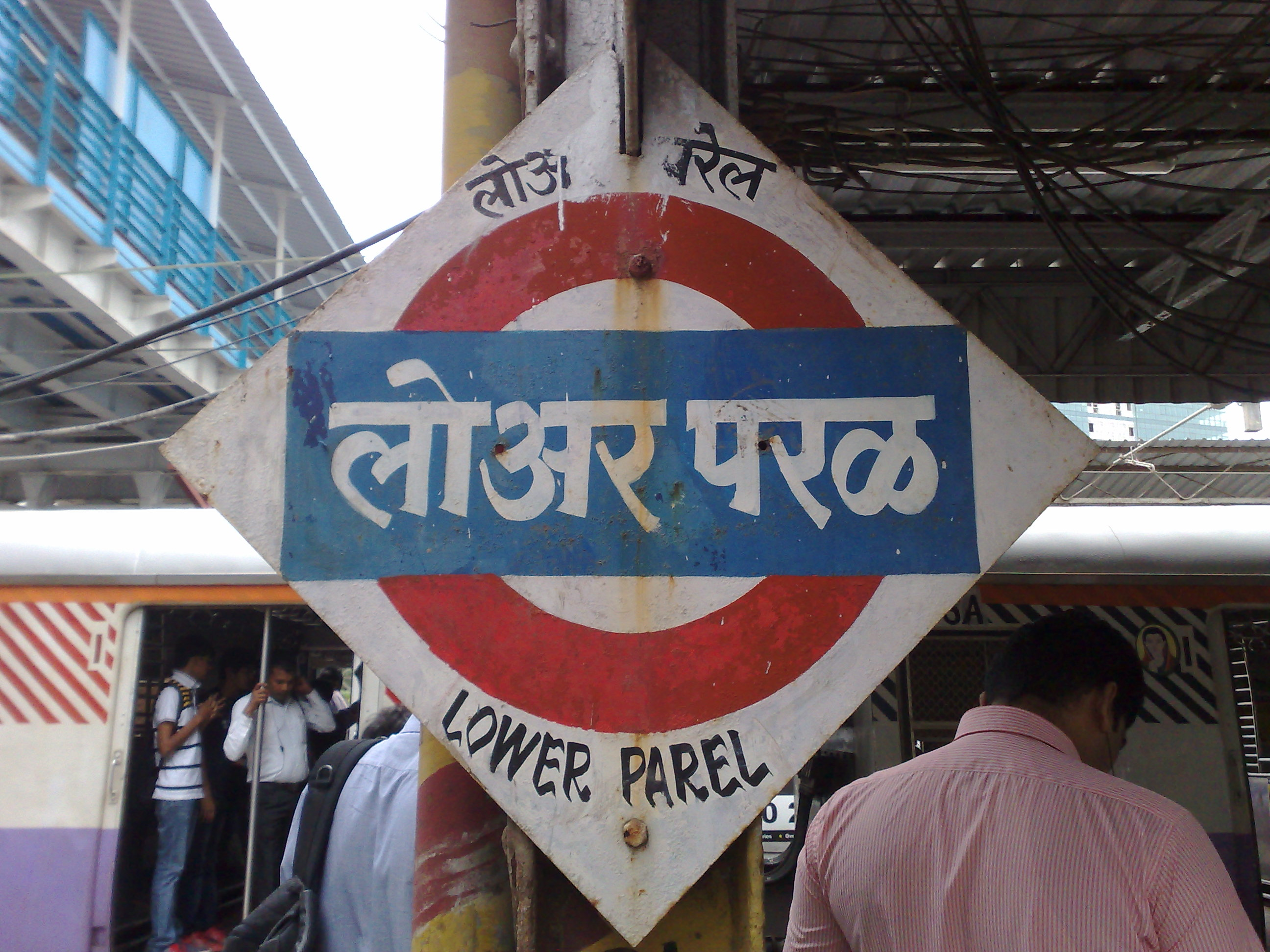
Lower Parel Platform board

== See also ==
- Carriage Repair Workshop, Lower Parel, Mumbai
