= Chembur monorail station =

Train station in Maharashtra, India

Chembur
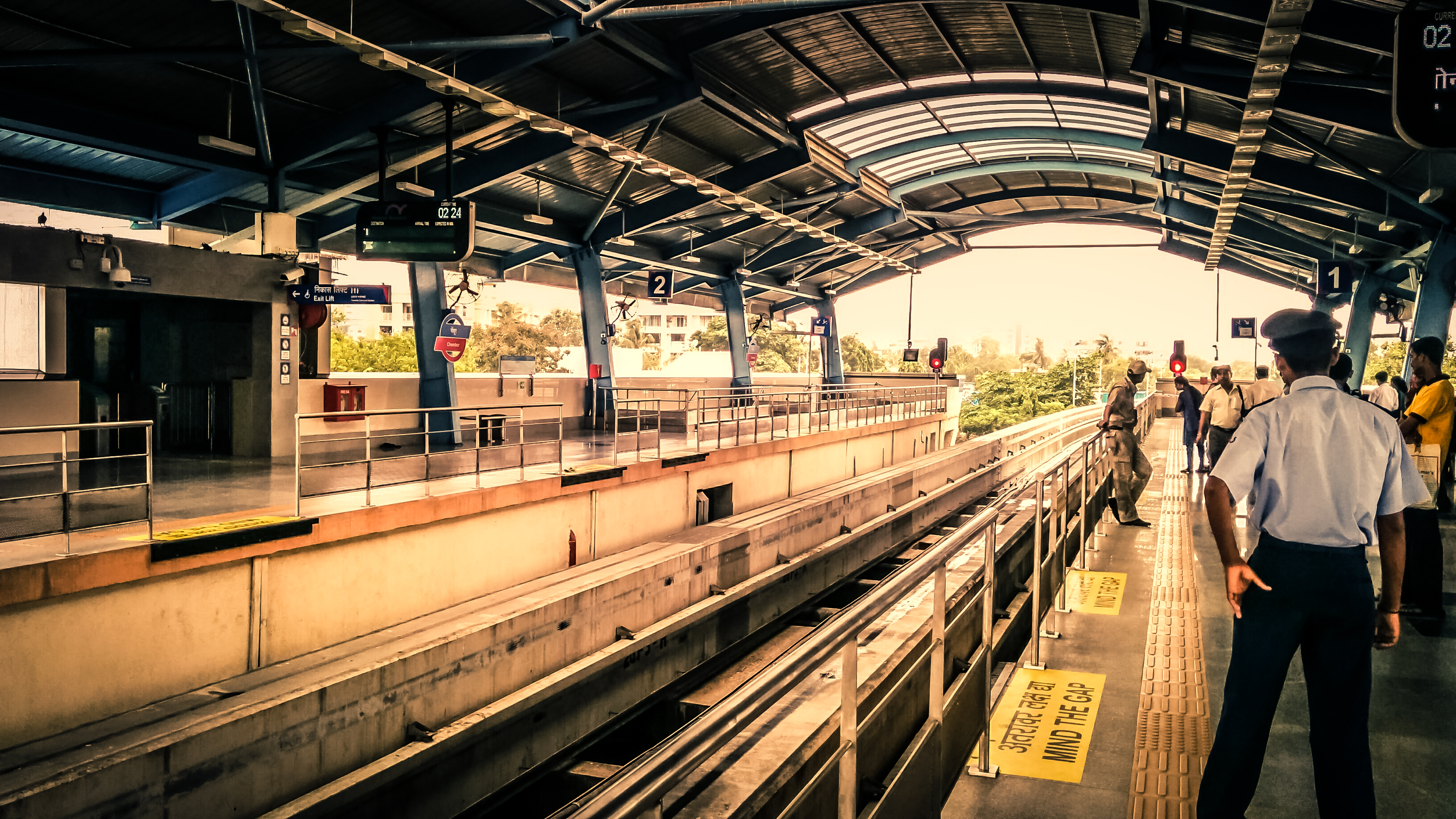
- Chembur Monorail station

General information
- Location: Chembur
- Coordinates: 19°03′40″N 72°53′51″E
- System: Monorail station
- Owner: Mumbai Metropolitan Region Development Authority (MMRDA)
- Line: Line 1
- Tracks: 2
- Connections: Line 2 Chembur; Harbour Chembur

Construction
- Structure type: Elevated
- Parking: No
- Cycle facilities: No

History
- Opened: 2 February 2014; 12 years ago

Passengers
- 2014: 5500 daily

Services
Preceding station	Mumbai Monorail	Following station
Terminus	Line 1	VNP and RC Marg towards Sant Gadge Maharaj Chowk
Out-of-system interchange
Preceding station	Mumbai Suburban Railway	Following station
Tilak Nagar towards Chhatrapati Shivaji Terminus	Harbour line transfer at Chembur	Govandi towards Panvel
Route map
- Sources: Google Maps
Location
- Location within Mumbai

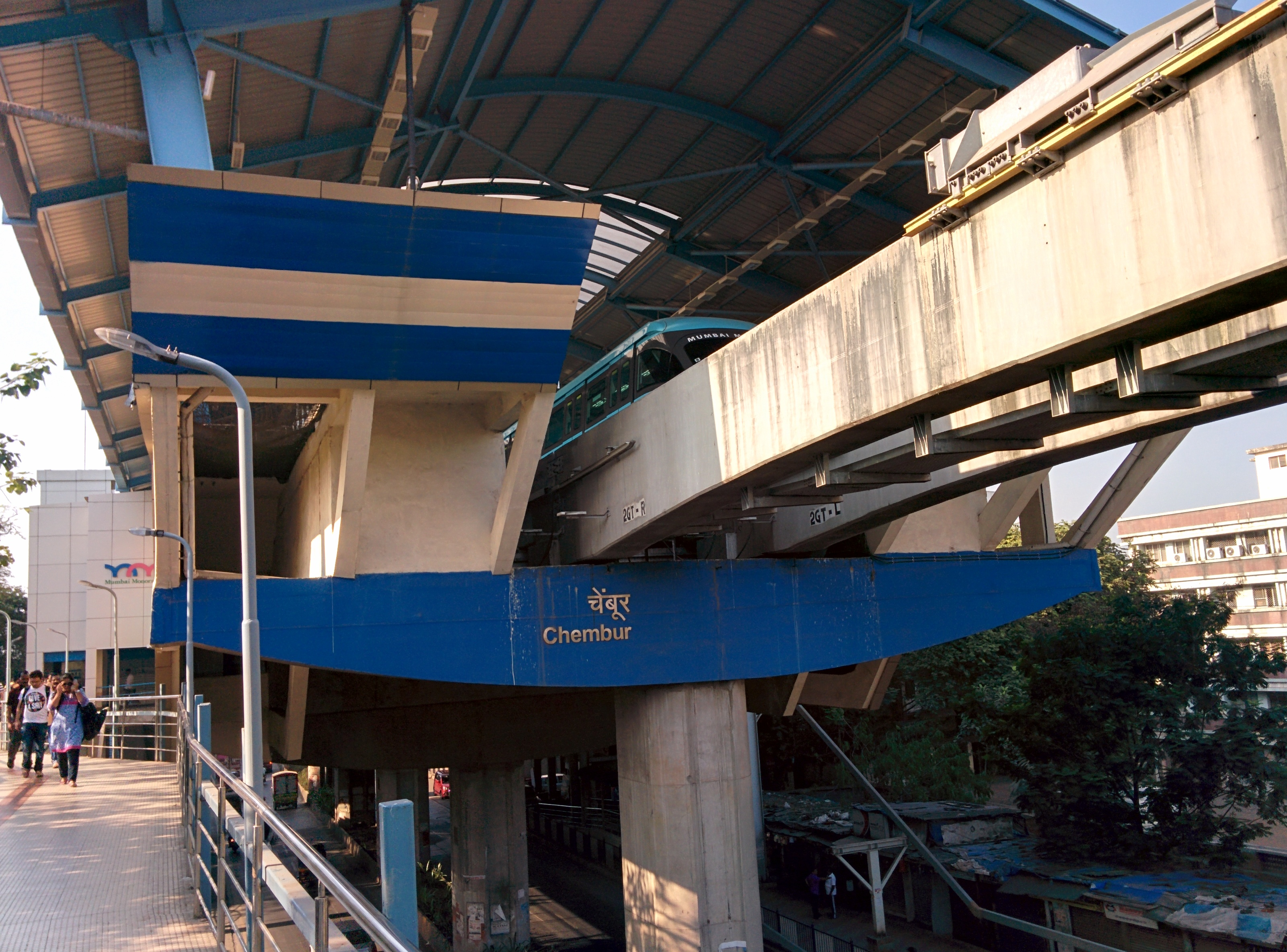
Chembur monorail station seen from outside

Chembur is a monorail station and the northern terminus of Line 1 of the Mumbai Monorail serving the Chembur suburb of Mumbai, India. It was opened to the public on the 2nd of February 2014, as part of the first phase of Line 1.

The Chembur monorail station is connected with a skywalk to the Chembur railway station.
