= Sant Gadge Maharaj Chowk monorail station =

Monorail station in Mumbai, India

Sant Gadge Maharaj Chowk

General information
- Location: Mahalaxmi East
- Coordinates: 18.98309°N 72.82858°E
- System: Light rapid transit
- Owner: MMRDA
- Line: Mumbai Monorail
- Tracks: 2
- Connections: Western Mahalaxmi; Mahalaxmi

Construction
- Structure type: Elevated
- Parking: No
- Cycle facilities: No

Other information
- Station code: GMC

History
- Opened: 3 March 2019; 7 years ago

Services
Preceding station	Mumbai Monorail	Following station
Lower Parel towards Chembur	Line 1	Terminus
Route map
- Sources: Google Maps
Location
- Location within Mumbai

Sant Gadge Maharaj Chowk is a monorail station and the southernmost terminus of the Mumbai Monorail, serving the area of Mahalaxmi and Byculla in South Mumbai. It was inaugurated on 3 March 2019 by Piyush Goyal, the then Railway Minister and Devendra Fadnavis, the then Chief Minister of Maharashtra. It serves as an interchange to Mumbai Metro Aqua Line's HDFC Life Mahalaxmi metro station at a 300metre distance which is also being connected with a travelator to Mahalaxmi railway station and the monorail station.

The station is located in the Vicinity of Arthur Road Jail, it is in close proximity to Mahalaxmi railway station, Chinchpokli railway station and Byculla railway station, Mahalaxmi Racecourse. The Dagdi Chawl can be accessed through this station. St. Ignatius High School is the only school located in its vicinity along with Kasturbha Gandhi Hospital. It also gives connectivity to Haji Ali Dargah and Worli, Lala Lajpat Rai College, Hira Panna, NH.SRCC Hospital.
