= T H Abdul Jabbar =

Indian politician (born 1960)

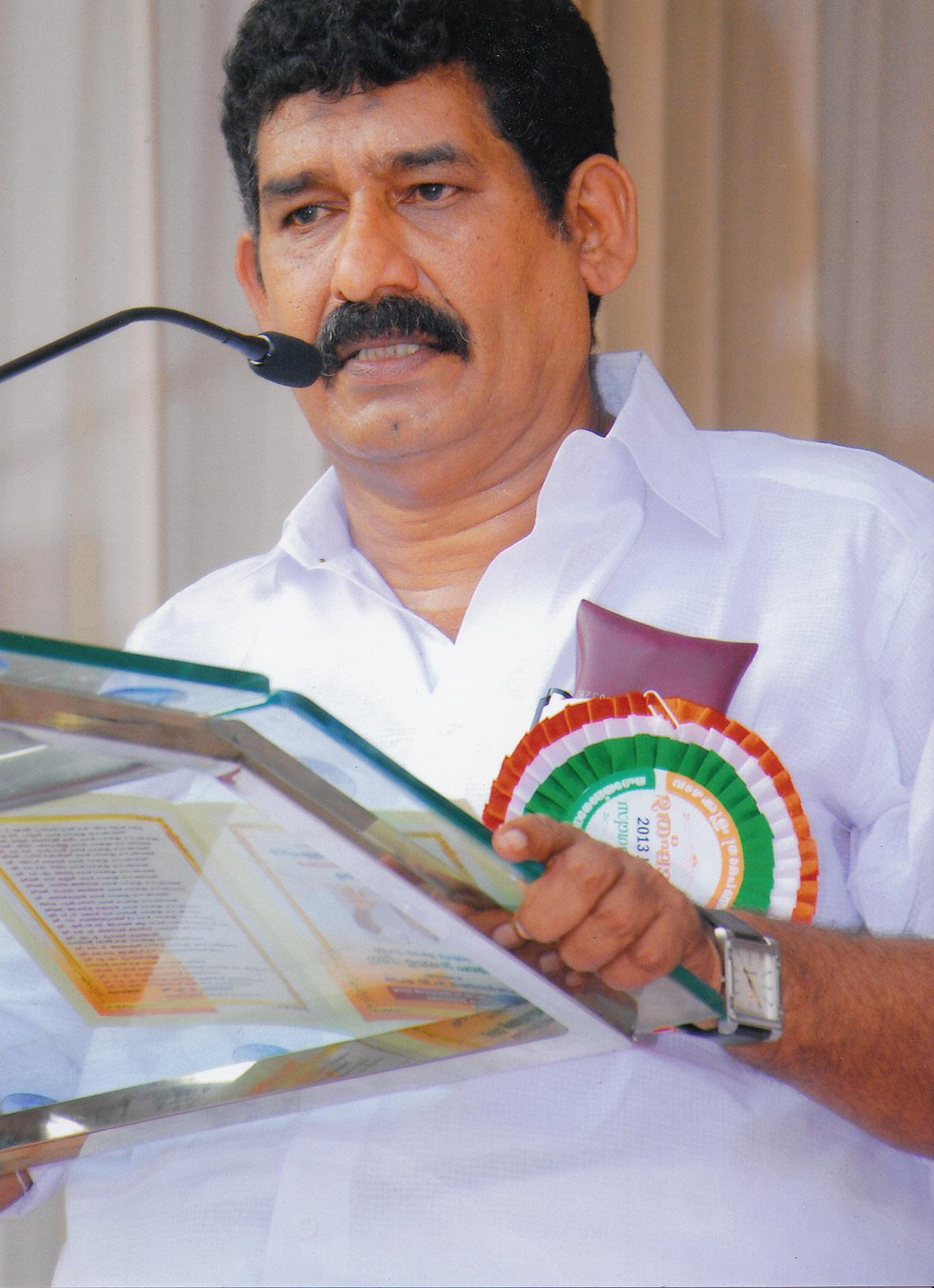
- T H Abdul JAbbar in 2013
- Born: 28 May 1960 (age 66); Perumbavoor, Ernakulam
- Years active: 2014
- Political party: Indian National Congress
- Spouse: Sebeena Jabbar
- Children: 2 son and 1 daughter
- Website: https://www.facebook.com/t.habduljabbar

T H Abdul Jabbar (born 28 May 1960) is the president of Vazhakkulam Panchayath in Ernakulam District and a leader of Indian National Congress. Abdul Jabbar is the brother of former Kerala food minister T H Musthafa. Abdul Jabbar born in Thottathil House, Marampilly, Perumbavoor. He has completed his schooling from Govt. Boys HSS, Perumbavoor. He has completed his graduation from St.Pauls College, Kalamassery, Kerala and post graduation in Economics from Dr. Ambedkar Law College, Wadala, Maharashtra. Abdul Jabbar married Sabeena Jabbar in 1985 and has three children.
