= Vidyalankar =

Vidyalankar may refer to:

== People ==
- Amarnath Vidyalankar (1902–1985), Indian politician
- Mahavarat Vidyalankar, Indian nationalist
- Teddy Vidyalankara (born 1955), Sri Lankan actor, and stunt director
- Vidyalankara Interpretation, concept by Sri Lankan philosopher Nalin de Silva

== Other uses ==
- Vidyalankar Institute of Technology, college
- Vidyalankara Pirivena, Buddhist college in Sri Lanka
- University of Kelaniya, formerly Vidyalankara University, Sri Lanka
