= K. Mohammed Ali =

Indian politician (1946–2022)

Member of the Kerala Legislative Assembly
- In office 1980–2006
- Preceded by: T. H. Musthafa
- Succeeded by: A. M. Yousaf
- Constituency: Aluva

Personal details
- Born: 17 March 1946
- Died: 19 September 2022 (aged 76)

K. Mohammed Ali (17 March 1946 – 19 September 2022) was an Indian politician belonging to Indian National Congress. He represented Aluva in the Kerala Legislative Assembly six times from 1980 to 2006.

He died in Ernakulam on 19 September 2022, aged 73.

== Career ==
Ali entered politics when he was a student through the students wing of congress. He was a member of Kerala Students Union (KSU). In 1966, he was elected as the Ernakulam district president of KSU. Later he became the president of Youth Congress in 1968. In 1970, Ali served as the general secretary of the organizing committee for the state rally by youth congress held at Kochi.

Ali had also served as a member of M.G University senate and Cochin University of Science and Technology syndicate. Mohammed Ali was the KPCC General Secretary from 1972 to 1975. Later he became the vice president of DCC. In 1973, he was appointed the working committee member of KPCC.

He won the Assembly election in 1980 and went on to represent Aluva constituency six times continuously. He contested in 1980 with the support of CPM against T.H Mustafa of Indira Congress who was Aluva's sitting MLA. It was AK Antony, who came up with suggesting Ali.

Ali retired from active politics in 2006 after losing in the assembly election held that year. Although continued to be active in public affairs, he was not active in political activities. Later he supported his daughter-in-law, who entered the field as a leftist candidate which led to criticism from several congress leaders.

== Other positions held ==
- International Peace Conference Moscow (participated in 1976)
- Hajj Committee Member
- State Corporative Union Member
- National Sainik Board Member
- Airport Society Limited Board Member
