= Thomas Joseph =

Malayalam writer (1954–2021)

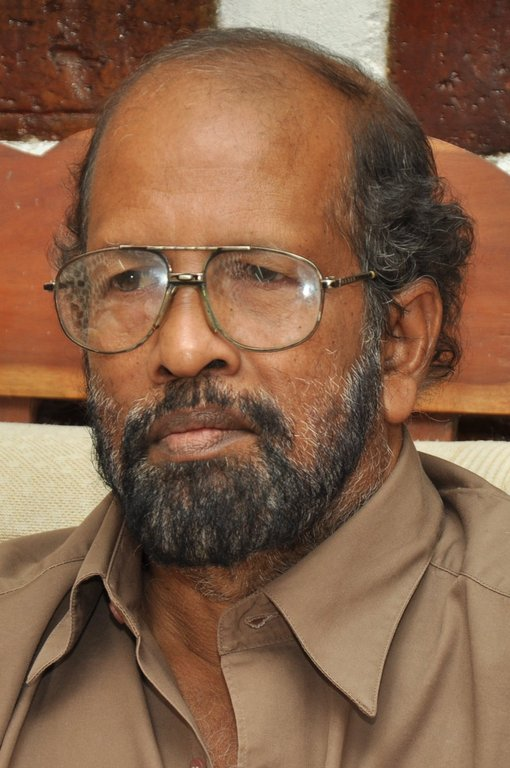
- Born: 8 June 1954; Eloor, Ernakulam district, Kerala, India
- Died: 29 July 2021 (aged 67); Eloor, Ernakulam district, Kerala, India
- Occupations: Short story writer, Novelist, Journalist
- Spouse: Rosily
- Children: 2
- Parents: Thomas Vadaykkal (father); Mary Vellayil (mother)
- Awards: 2013 Kerala Sahitya Akademi Award for Story; 2009 Children's literary institute Award; 2003 V. P. Sivakumar Memorial Keli Award; 1996 SBT Literary Prize; 1995 K. A. Kodungallore Award; Delhi Short Story Award

Thomas Joseph (8 June 1954 – 29 July 2021) was an Indian writer of Malayalam literature. He received Kerala Sahitya Akademi Award for Story in 2013 for his work, Marichavar Cinema KaanukayaaNu (The Dead are Watching Movies). He was also a recipient of SBT Literary Award, Delhi Short Story Award, K. A. Kodungallore Award, V. P. Sivakumar memorial Keli Award and the Children's literary institute Award. He died on 29 July 2021, at the age of 67.

== Biography ==
Thomas Joseph was born on 8 June 1954, in Eloor, an industrial town in Ernakulam district of the south Indian state of Kerala to Thomas Vadaykkal and Mary Vellayil. He wrote his first short story when he was a 5th standard student and started publishing stories in Malayalam weeklies during his high school and college period. He published his first collection of short stories, Athbhuta-samasya, in 1989. His Chitra-salabhangalude Kappal (The Ship of Butterflies), short stories collection, was awarded the SBT Literary Award in 1996. His story "Athbhuta-samasya", was published in the magazine Saketam, under the editorialship of Narendra Prasad and V. P. Sivakumar. He published eight books, which include six collections of short stories.

== Death ==
Thomas Joseph worked at Chandrika and Indian Express daily newspapers and in Pen books. Towards the latter part of his life, he resided at Keezhmad, Aluva and it was here, he suffered a massive stroke while asleep on 15 September 2018, due to which he was admitted to Rajagiri hospital in Kalamassery. Due to limited financial resources, his family could not afford the expenses of the medical treatment and his friends and fellow writers resorted to crowd funding to raise the required money. Though later discharged, he stayed in a coma for around three years before his death at his home on 29 July 2021, aged 67.

== Awards and honors ==
Thomas Joseph received Mrigaya magazine's ‘Mrigaya Award-1984’ through the Readers’ Gallup poll. He was also the recipient of Delhi Short Story Award, K. A. Kodungallore Award (1995), V. P. Sivakumar memorial Keli Award (2003) and the Children's literary institute Award (2009). His short story collection, Marichavar cinema kaaNukayaaNu (The Dead are Watching Movies) received the Kerala Sahitya Akademi Award for Story in 2013.

== Bibliography ==
=== Novels ===
- Joseph, Thomas (2019). Ammayude Udaram Adachu (in Malayalam). Kochi: Vayanappura Publications. p. 264. ISBN 9788193773574.
- Thomas Joseph (2013). Paralōka vāsasthalaṅgaḷ. Kottayam: DC Books. p. 143. ISBN 978-81-264-4884-5. OCLC 878813280.

=== Short story anthologies ===
- Jōsaph, Tōmas (2016). Paippinchuvaṭṭil Moonnu Str̲eekaḷ. Thrissur, [Kerala]: Green Books. p. 88. ISBN 978-81-8423-505-0. OCLC 987157312.
- Joseph, Thomas (2002). Pashuvumaayi Nadakkunna Oraal. Thrissur, [Kerala]: Current Books.
- Joseph, Thomas (2013). Paraloka vasasthalangal. Kottayam, India: DC Books.
- Joseph, Thomas (1988). Atbhutha samasya. Aluva, Kerala: Bansuri Books.
- Joseph, Thomas. Oru Irunda Sasyamaay Chuttippinanju (ഒരു ഇരുണ്ട സസ്യമായി ചുറ്റിപ്പിണഞ്ഞ്‌). Kochi: Mathrubhumi Books. p. 64.
- Joseph, Thomas. Marichavar Cinema Kanukayanu (in Malayalam). Kochi.
