= Aluva Assembly constituency =

Constituency of the Kerala legislative assembly in India

Coordinates: 10.10°N 76.34°E

Aluva
- Constituency No. 76 for the Kerala Legislative Assembly
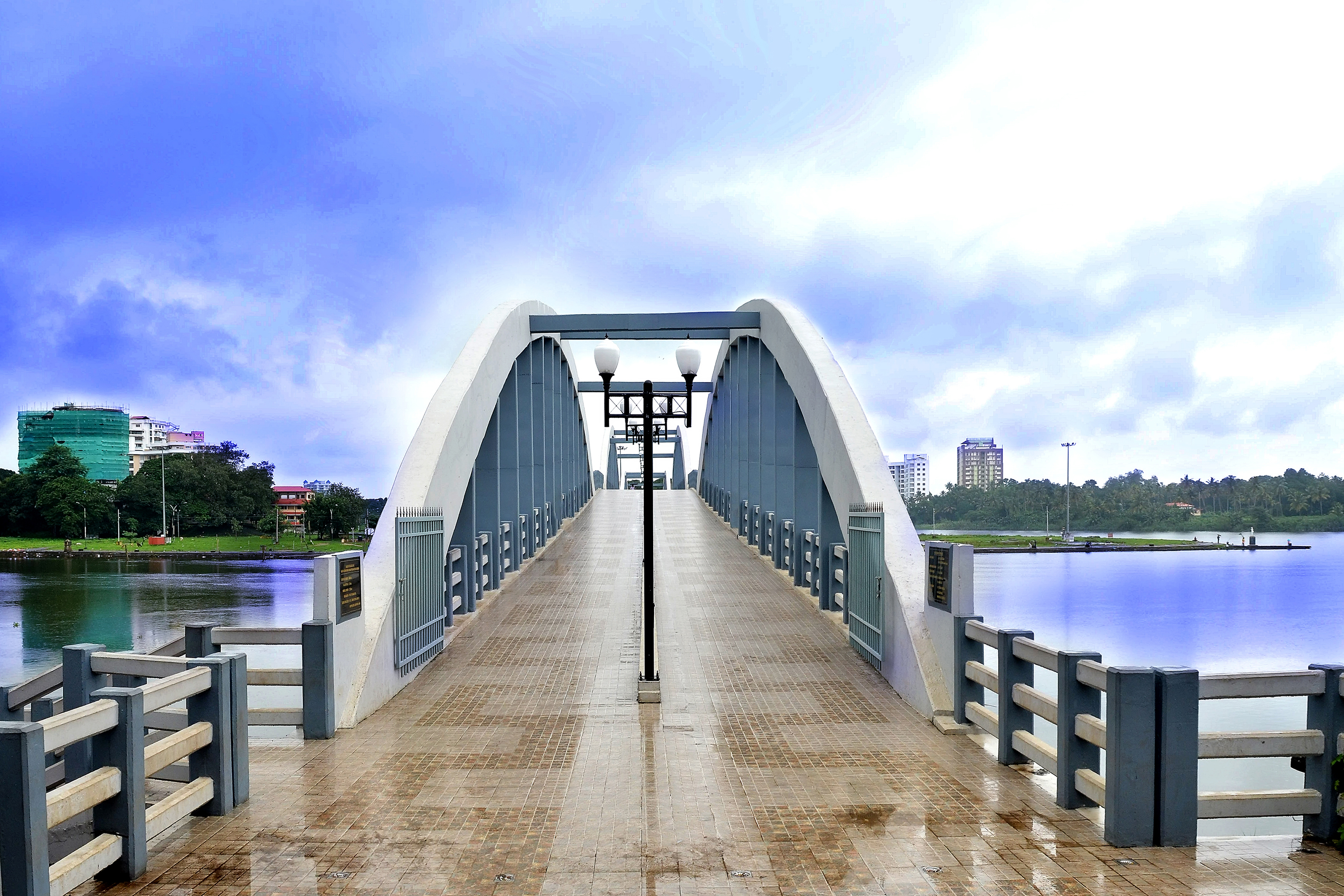
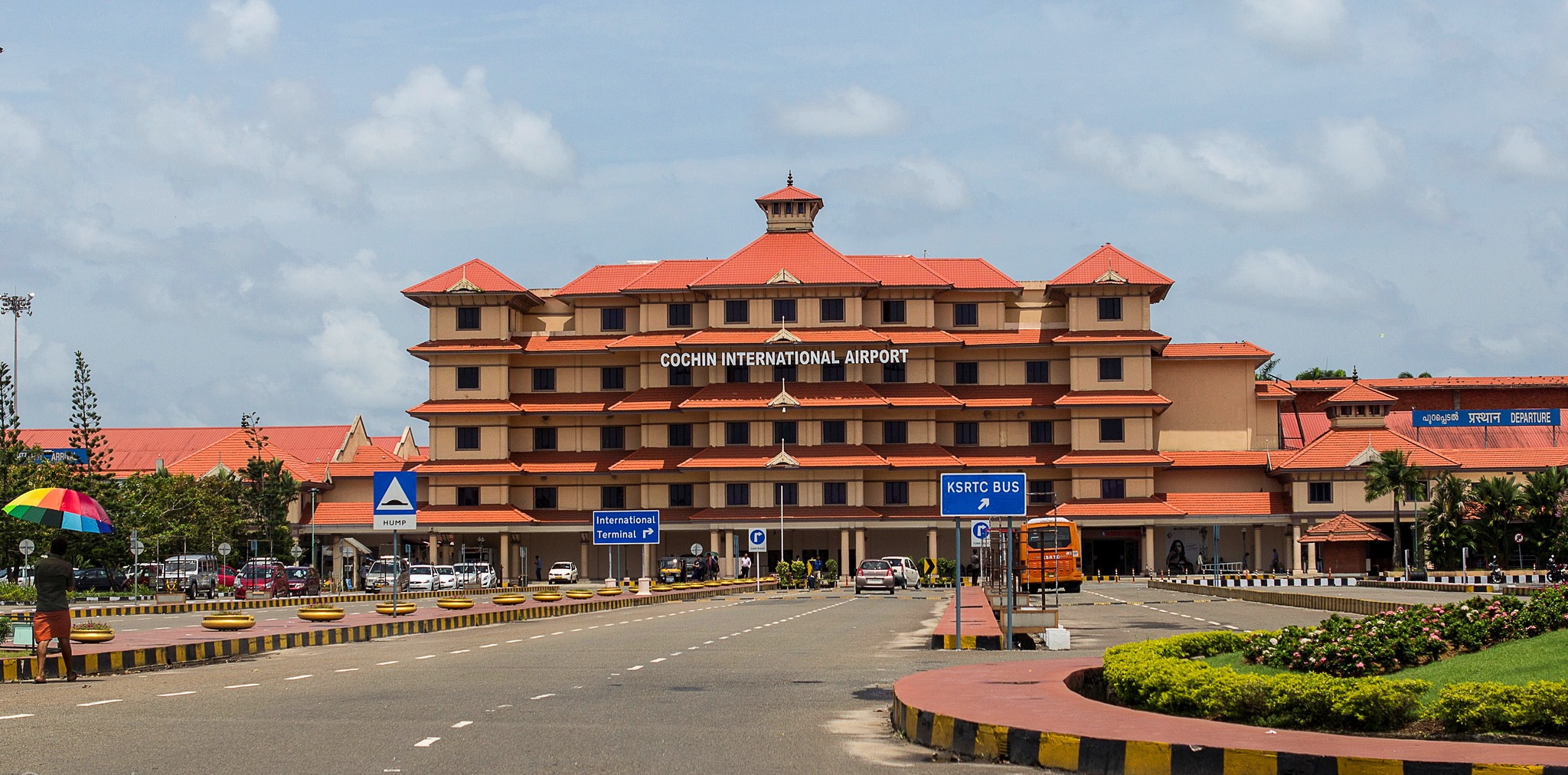
- Top to Bottom: Aluva New Bridge, Cochin International Airport at Nedumbassery

Constituency details
- Country: India
- Region: South India
- State: Kerala
- District: Ernakulam
- Established: 1957
- Total electors: 1,96,483 (2021)
- Reservation: None

Member of Legislative Assembly
- 16th Kerala Legislative Assembly
- Incumbent Anwar Sadath
- Party: INC
- Alliance: UDF
- Elected year: 2026

Aluva State assembly constituency is one of the 140 state legislative assembly constituencies in Kerala in southern India. It is also one of the seven state legislative assembly constituencies included in Chalakudy Lok Sabha constituency. As of the 2026 Assembly elections, the current MLA is Anwar Sadath of INC.

== Local self-governed segments ==
Aluva Niyamasabha constituency is composed of the following local self-governed segments:

Name	Status (Grama panchayat/Municipality)	Taluk
Aluva	Municipality	Aluva
Chengamanad	Grama panchayat	Aluva
Choornikkara	Grama panchayat	Aluva
Edathala	Grama panchayat	Aluva
Kanjoor	Grama panchayat	Aluva
Keezhmad	Grama panchayat	Aluva
Nedumbassery	Grama panchayat	Aluva
Sreemoolanagaram	Grama panchayat	Aluva

== Members of Legislative Assembly ==
The following list contains all members of Kerala Legislative Assembly who have represented the constituency:

Election	Niyama Sabha	Member	Party	Tenure
1957	1st	T. O. Bava	INC	1957 – 1960
1960	2nd	T. O. Bava	INC	1960 – 1965
1967	3rd	M. K. A. Hameed	Independent	1967 – 1970
1970	4th	A. A. Kochunny	INC	1970 – 1977
1977	5th	T. H. Mustafa	INC	1977 – 1980
1980	6th	K. Mohammed Ali	INC(U)	1980 – 1982
1982	7th	K. Mohammed Ali	Independent	1982 – 1987
1987	8th	K. Mohammed Ali	INC	1987 – 1991
1991	9th	K. Mohammed Ali	INC	1991 – 1996
1996	10th	K. Mohammed Ali	INC	1996 – 2001
2001	11th	K. Mohammed Ali	INC	2001 – 2006
2006	12th	A. M. Yousaf	CPI(M)	2006 – 2011
2011	13th	Anwar Sadath	INC	2011 – 2016
2016	14th	Anwar Sadath	INC	2016 - 2021
2021	15th	Anwar Sadath	INC	2021 - 2026
2026	16th	Anwar Sadath	INC	2026 - Current

== Election results ==
Percentage change (±%) denotes the change in the number of votes from the immediate previous election.

=== 2026 ===
2026 Kerala Legislative Assembly election: Aluva
Party	Candidate	Votes	%	±%
INC	Anwar Sadath	83,899	52.78	
CPI(M)	A. M. Ariff	54,756	34.45	
BJP	M. A. Brahmaraj	18,732	11.78	
AAP	Hakhikhath Hameed	403	0.25	
NOTA	None of the above	1,172	0.74	
Margin of victory		29,143	18.33	
Turnout		1,58,962		
INC hold		Swing		

=== 2021 ===
There were 1,82,360 registered voters in the constituency for the 2021 Kerala Assembly election.

2021 Kerala Legislative Assembly election: Aluva
Party	Candidate	Votes	%	±%
INC	Anwar Sadath	73,703		
LDF	Adv. Shelna Nishad	54,817		
BJP	M. N. Gopi	15,893		
SDPI	V. A. Rasheed	2,224		
WPOI	K. M. Shefrin	1,713		
NOTA	None of the above	939		
Independent	K. V. Sarala	569		
Marxist Communist Party of India	Viswakala Thankappan	342		
SUCI(C)	A. G. Ajayan	228		
Margin of victory		18,886		
Turnout		1,49,489		
INC hold		Swing		

=== 2016 ===
There were 1,76,505 registered voters in the constituency for the 2016 Kerala Assembly election.

2016 Kerala Legislative Assembly election: Aluva
Party	Candidate	Votes	%	±%
INC	Anwar Sadath	69,568	47.30	▼2.94
CPI(M)	V. Saleem	50,733	34.56	▼5.35
BJP	Latha Gangadharan	19,349	13.18	▲6.72
WPOI	Samad P. I.	2,031	1.38	−
Independent	Jose Mavely	1,726	1.18	−
SDPI	Ajmal Ismail	1,716	1.17	▼1.15
NOTA	None of the above	750	0.51	−
PDP	Nazar Kodikuthumala	480	0.33	−
Independent	Shamsudeen C. A.	138	0.09	−
Independent	Rejimon	114	0.08	−
SUCI(C)	A. Brahamakumar	114	0.08	▼0.03
Independent	Khalid Mundappilly	86	0.06	−
Margin of victory		18,835	12.83	▲2.50
Turnout		1,46,805	83.17	▲2.66
INC hold		Swing	▼2.94	

=== 2011 ===
There were 1,58,819 registered voters in the constituency for the 2011 election.

2011 Kerala Legislative Assembly election: Aluva
Party	Candidate	Votes	%	±%
INC	Anwar Sadath	64,244	50.24	
CPI(M)	A. M. Youssaf	51,030	39.91	
BJP	M. N. Gopi	8,264	6.46	−
SDPI	Roy Arackal	1,684	1.32	
Independent	M .M .Yoosaf Mundakkal	829	0.65	−
Independent	Anwar Sadath Panackaparambil	547	0.43	
SS	K. Y. Kunjumon	479	0.37	−
BSP	Abdul Azeez	473	0.37	−
Independent	Anthony Joseph Manjooran	182	0.14	−
SUCI(C)	K. K .Sobha	138	0.11	
Margin of victory		13,214	10.33	
Turnout		1,27,870	80.51	
INC gain from CPI(M)		Swing		

== See also ==
- Aluva
- Ernakulam district
- List of constituencies of the Kerala Legislative Assembly
- 2016 Kerala Legislative Assembly election
