= T. O. Bava =

Indian politician

President of the Kerala Pradesh Congress Committee
- In office 1967–1969
- National President: K. Kamaraj; S. Nijalingappa
- Preceded by: K. C. Abraham
- Succeeded by: K. K. Viswanathan

Member of the Kerala Legislative Assembly
- In office 1957–1964
- Constituency: Aluva

Personal details
- Born: 20 January 1919
- Died: 26 July 2007

Tharackandathil Ooran Bava (20 January 1919 – 26 July 2007) was an Indian politician who served as the president of the Kerala Pradesh Congress Committee between 1967 and 1969. Bava represented Aluva in the first and second Kerala Legislative Assemblies. Bava also served as a member of the Travancore-Cochin Legislative Assembly from 1954 to 1956.
