= Wadala =

Locality in Mumbai, Maharashtra, India

Wadala Vadala
- neighborhood
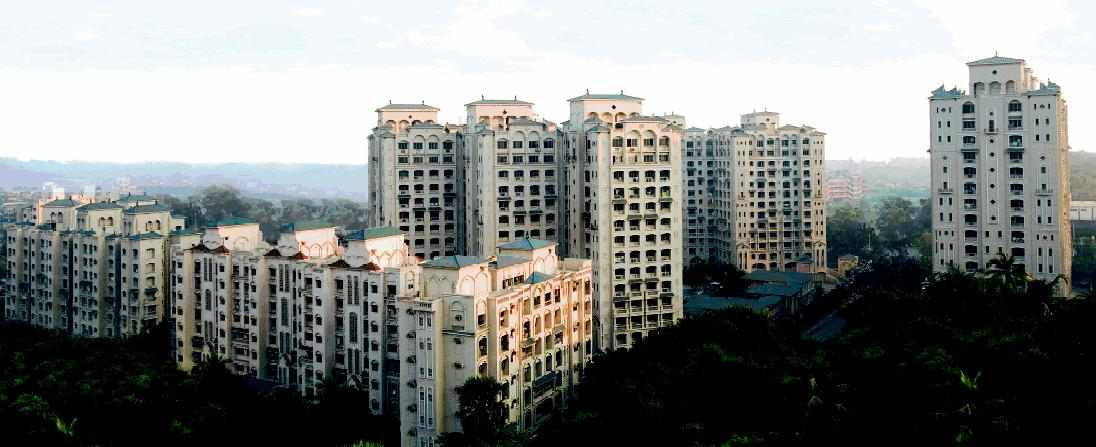
- Dosti Acres, Wadala East

- Location within Mumbai
- Coordinates: 19.021632°N 72.86459°E
- Country: India
- State: Maharashtra
- District: Mumbai City
- City: Mumbai
- Zone: 4
- Ward: H North

Government
  - Type: Municipal Corporation
  - Body: Brihanmumbai Municipal Corporation (MCGM)

Languages
  - Official: Marathi
- Time zone: UTC+5:30 (IST)
- PIN: 400 031; 400 037
- Area code: 022
- Vehicle registration: MH-01
- Lok Sabha constituency: Mumbai South Central
- Vidhan Sabha constituency: Naigaon

Wadala (also spelled Vadala, formula spelt Wuddala, [ʋəɖaːɭa]) is a neighborhood in Mumbai. Wadala Road is a station on the Harbour Line of Mumbai's railway network.

== Overview ==
Wadala has several schools and some renowned institutions like Veermata Jijabai Technological Institute (VJTI), Institute of Chemical Technology (erstwhile UDCT)), Vidyalankar Institute of Technology (VIT), South Indians' Welfare Society College (SIWS), St.Joseph's High School, and Auxilium Convent High School located near one another. SNDT Women's University, Dr. Ambedkar Commerce & Law College also has a campus in Wadala West. The local college of Wadala is SIWS near the Wadala station. The largest bus depot in Mumbai, BEST's Wadala depot, is located here.

The Ackworth Leprosy Hospital was established during British rule, and part of its complex is now given to an AIDS awareness organisation as well. The world's first methane generation plant was set up in the Ackworth hospital complex.

== History ==
=== Prehistoric ===
Wadala village lay on one of the Seven Islands of Bombay that were joined to form the modern day Mumbai. The island was previously called by different names: Parel, Matunga, Dharavi or Sion.

=== 19th century ===
The Dadar-Matunga-Wadala-Sion scheme of 1899-1900 was the first planned suburban scheme in Bombay. The Bombay City Improvement Trust which was set after a bill was passed in the British parliament, formulated this plan in order to relieve congestion in the centre of the town, following the plague epidemics of the 1890s. According to the survey plan, 85,000 people were to be accommodated in the developments in Wadala.

The plans regulated constructions with emphasis on proper sanitation. Buildings were to be three storeys high, and were to have open spaces between them. The land-use was planned to be a mix of residential, commercial and institutional constructions. Parks and gardens were planned, and the streets were well laid out.

440 acres (1.8 km^{2}) of land was procured and leased to the Government for selling. For the first time housing cooperatives were formed to take advantage of newly developed land. The Parsi (Zoroastrian) and Hindu colonies in Dadar-Wadala were developed in this way.

=== 20th century ===
In 1915 the Port Trust Railway opened the Wadala Ballard Pier railway line. Petrol and kerosene installations also came up in Wadala. The Veermata Jijabai Technological Institute (formerly the Victoria Jubilee Technological Institute) moved to its present campus at Wadala in 1923. The Institute of Chemical Technology (formerly the University Department of Chemical Technology) was established in Wadala in 1934.

During the Civil Disobedience Movement, the Wadala Salt Works was raided by around 1,500 volunteers of the Congress party on 1 June 1930. The incident occurred after an appeal was made in the Congress Bulletin of 31 May, to challenge the 'British anarchy'. The British government in India reacted quickly and 11 women were detained.

== Geography ==
Wadala was once considered a central suburb of the city of Mumbai, but it is now well within the city limits. The area is bordered by Dadar on the West, Matunga on the Northwest and Sewri on the South.

The north eastern areas of Wadala are covered by salt pans, which are on the shores of the Thane creek. On the Eastern border of Wadala, MMRDA has planned to construct a truck terminus, spread over 115 hectares (1.15 km^{2}).

Mumbai will have for the first time a centralized facility for the transport of goods by road.

== Landmarks and architecture ==
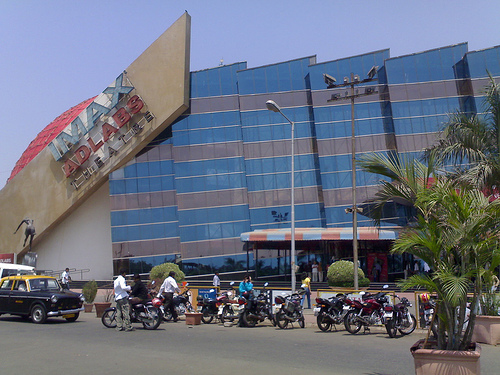
IMAX Wadala, the world's largest IMAX dome theater

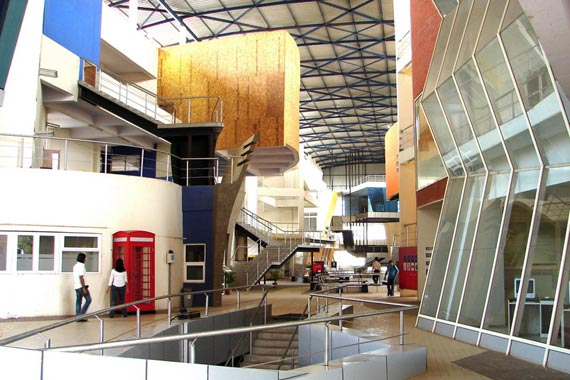
Vidyalankar Institute of Technology

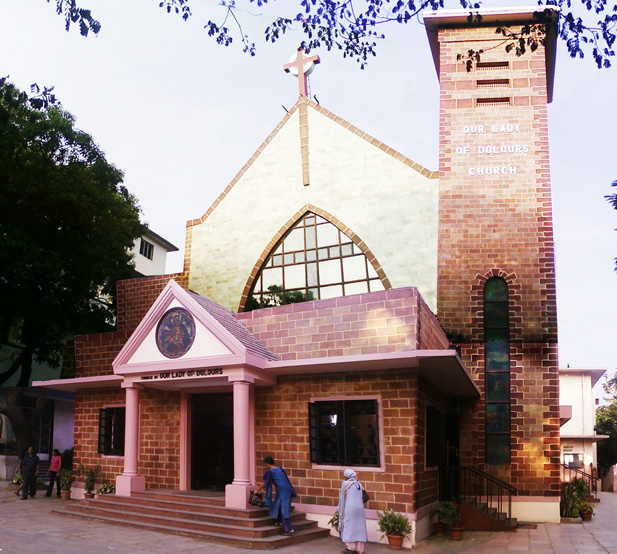
Our Lady of Dolours Church Wadala, situated inside the campus of St. Joseph's High School, Wadala

Wadala has a large number of old temples, university campuses and is also home to a former world's largest IMAX dome theater. It is also home to the Vidyalankar Educational Campus, whose building design has won an international award viz. Designshare's Honour award. The BEST Transport Museum is also located at Wadala's Anik bus depot.

It features amateur mini models of BEST buses and the ancient trams.

Wadala is also known for churches, temples and dargas. Near the station is the 400-year-old Vitthal Temple built by Sant Tukaram who brought the idol from Pandharpur, home of the original temple of Lord Vithal. The temple is known as Prati Pandharpur (Pandharpur temple's replica). One of the many one-day festivals in Mumbai has been held in this temple to devote Lord Vitthal on Ashadhi Ekadashi (According to Hindu Calendar) in June/July. Near this temple is the 15th-century Lord Ram temple and the Hanuman temple on the opposite side of the road. The Ram Temple also houses a marriage hall. Located on David S. Baretto Road is a Krishna Temple which also houses an orphanage. Wadala also has a Balaji Temple, that celebrates the Jatra festival each year in the month of January. Apart from these, there is also a Shiv Temple, a Devi Mandir and a small Gurudwara near the station.

The St. Joseph Church (Our Lady of Dolours Church) is situated on the D. S. Barretto Road, between Five Gardens and Wadala station. This also houses the St. Joseph's High School. Opposite is the Don Bosco Shelter which is a centre for the rehabilitation and education of underprivileged children. The Barkat Ali Dargah is located on a hill where the bridge connecting Wadala East to Wadala West ends. It is another of Wadala's landmarks.

The St. Dominic Savio Church is located in Wadala East. This church, built in 1981, was the first of Mumbai churches to be situated on the first floor.

Wadala (East) houses two cemeteries, the Baháʼí Cemetery and the Chinese Cemetery. These cemeteries were laid out in Wadala a long time ago, for the same reason that the Ackworth Leprosy Home was built at Wadala viz. Wadala was considered a distant suburb of the city.

A number of housing colonies exist in Wadala. Some of them are Bhakti Park, Dosti Acres, Eucress and Lloyd's Estate. Wadala East also has the BPT (now MbPT housing colony), a large sprawling colony for the port workers complete with a hospital. Near Antop Hill, the government of India established the Intellectual Property Office responsible for Controlling General of Patents, Designs and Trademarks in India.

About 2 kilometers from Wadala Station East, past the truck terminus, is Flamingo Bay. From 1994, lesser flamingos have been wintering here. From December to March, thousands of flamingos descend on the mudflats, a mile from the shore, to feed on the nutrient-rich marshes. The proposed Nhava Sheva bridge that will connect the island to the mainland has faced criticism from environmentalists, who allege that the habitat of these birds would be destroyed if the project is approved and completed.

Over the years, slum development had started in Wadala adjacent to the railway tracks and a large colony began to form. In 2006, the state government took action and cleared the area of slums.

== Utilities ==
Wadala receives electricity supplied by the BEST undertaking. Wadala experiences very few electricity cuts in a year, if at all. There are a number of schools, colleges and hospitals. There are police stations in both Wadala West and East. The Voice of Wadala is the neighbourhood newsletter, in print since 1988. One of the concerns for residents of Wadala is that it does not have any malls or supermarkets. For shopping, one has to use local shops, or travel to Matunga or Dadar.

=== List of colleges ===
- Institute of Chemical Technology (formerly UDCT)
- Vidyalankar Campus (Engineering (UG & PG), Science and Management Colleges)
- Veermata Jijabai Technological Institute (V.J.T.I)

== Gallery ==
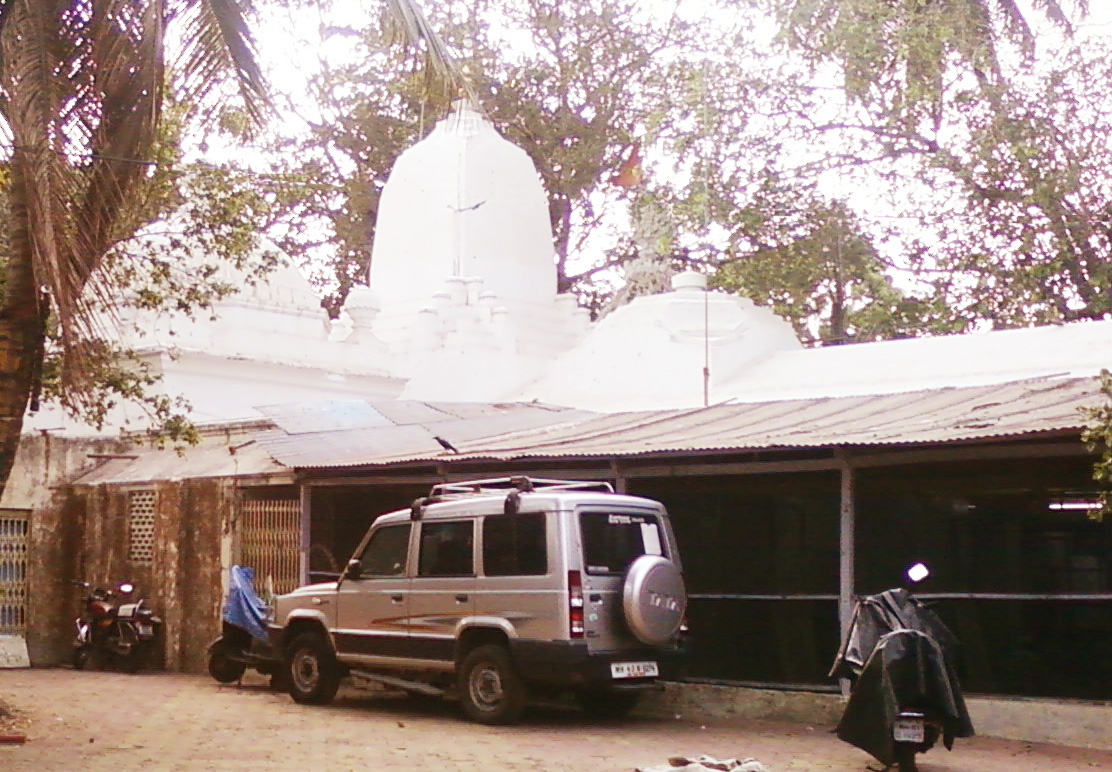
Vithhal Mandir, Wadala West

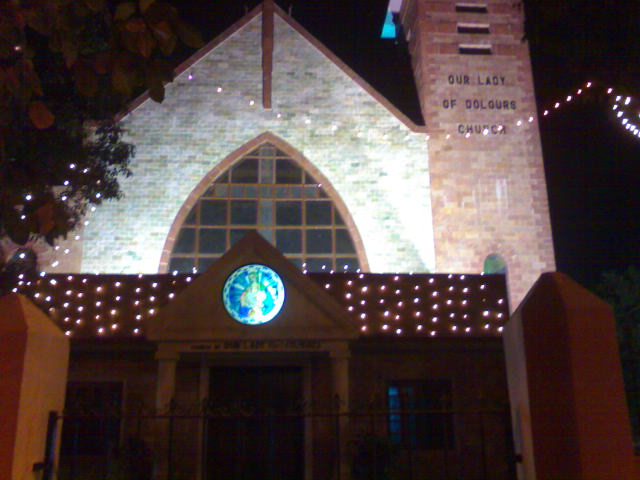
Our Lady of Dolours Church, Wadala West

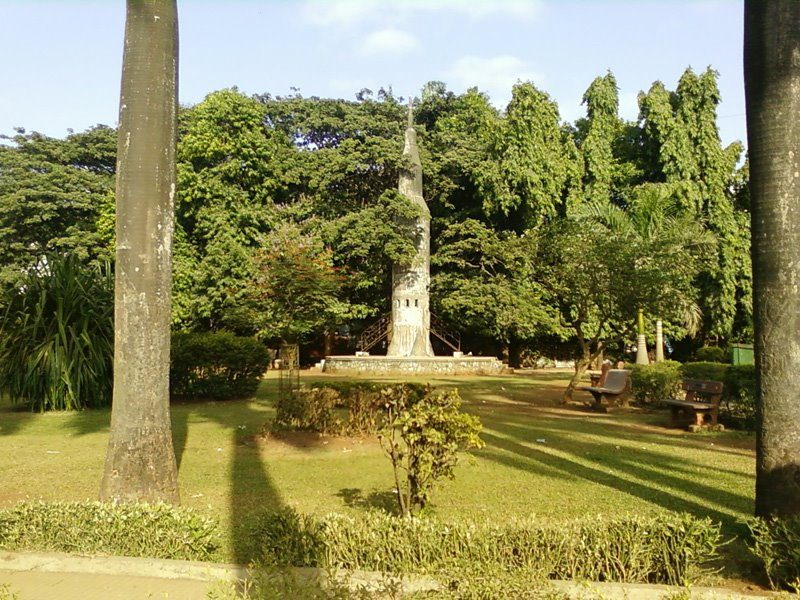
Rocket Garden, Wadala West

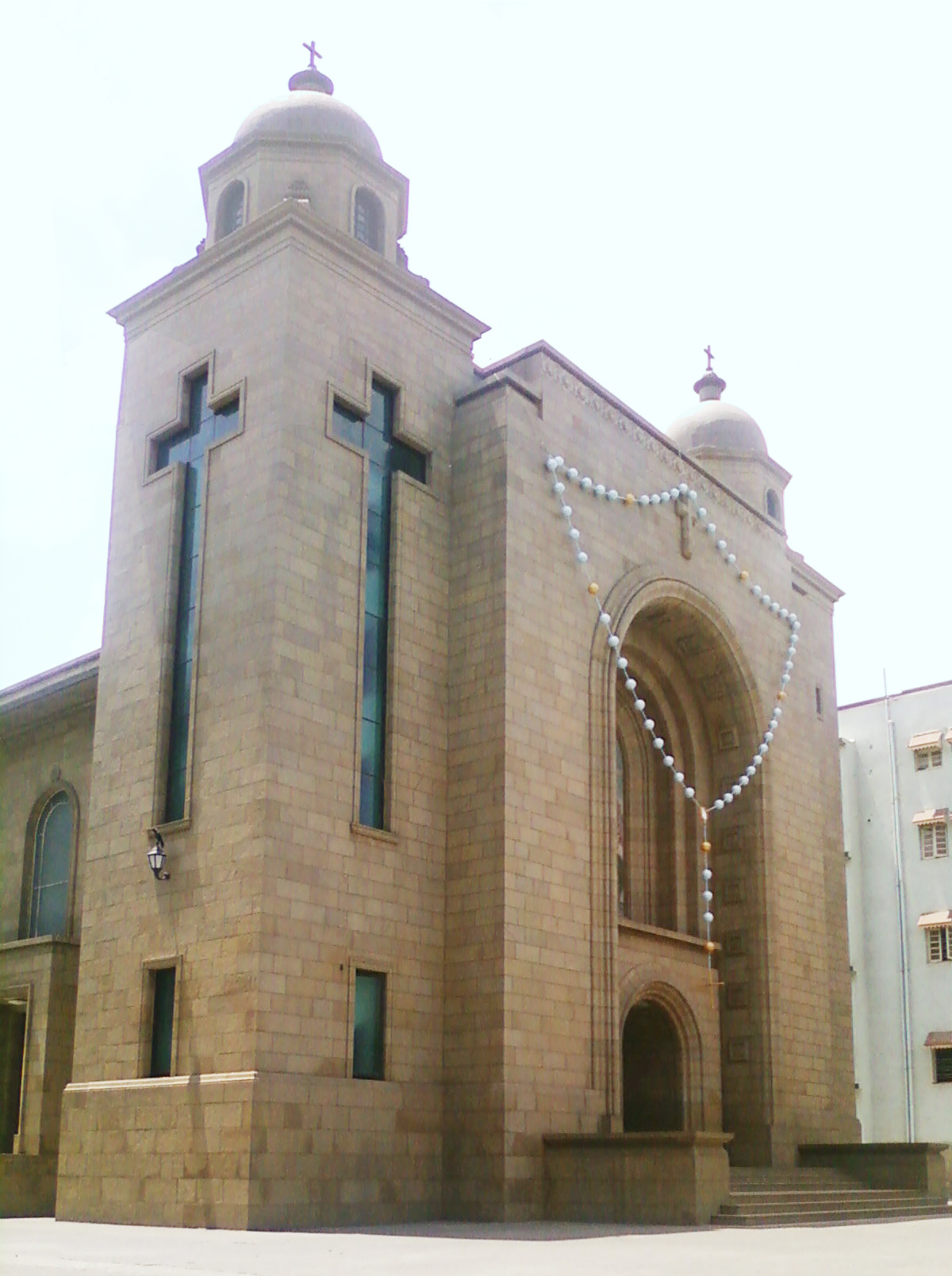
Don Bosco Church, Wadala West

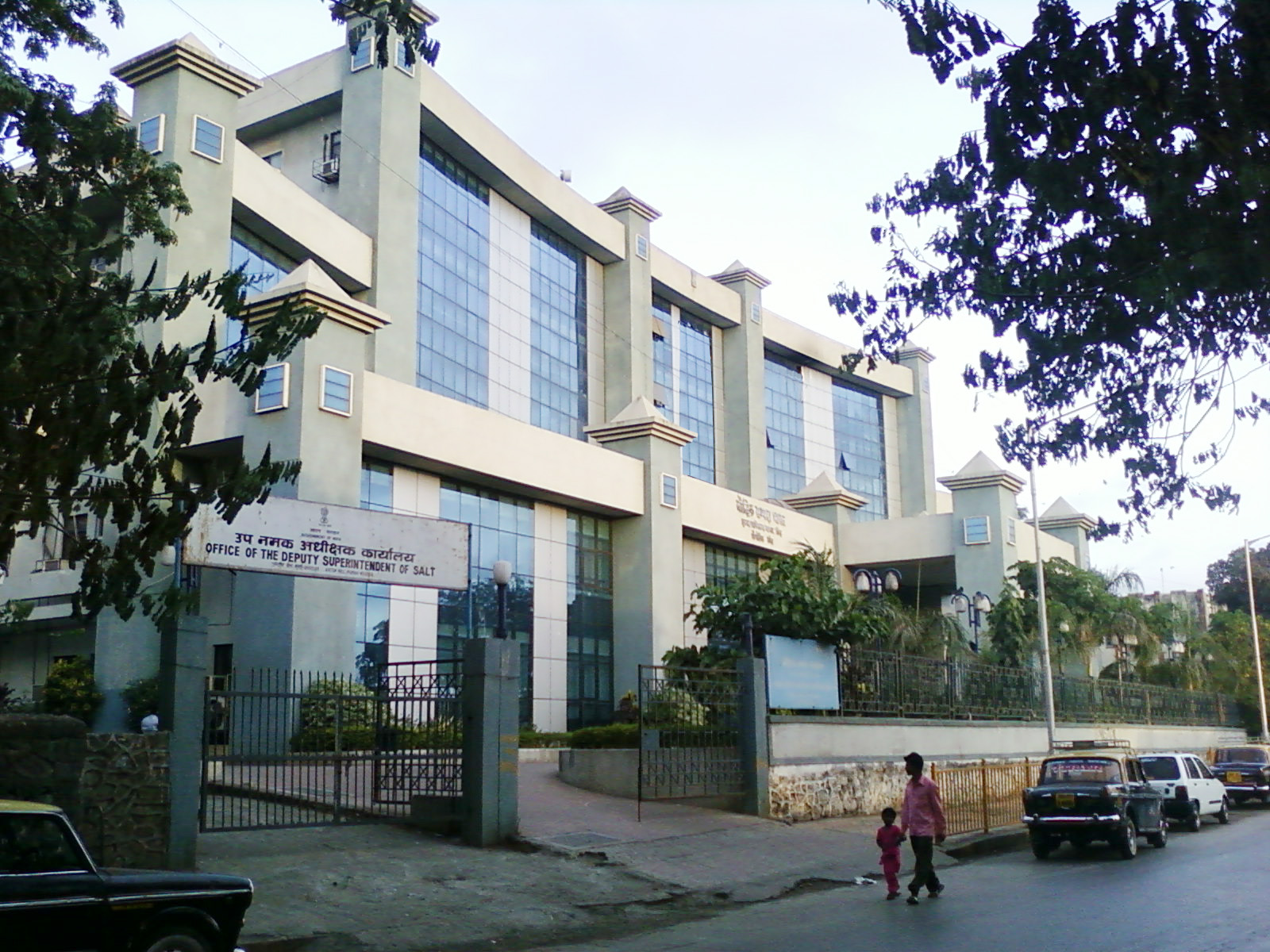
Indian Patent Office, Wadala East

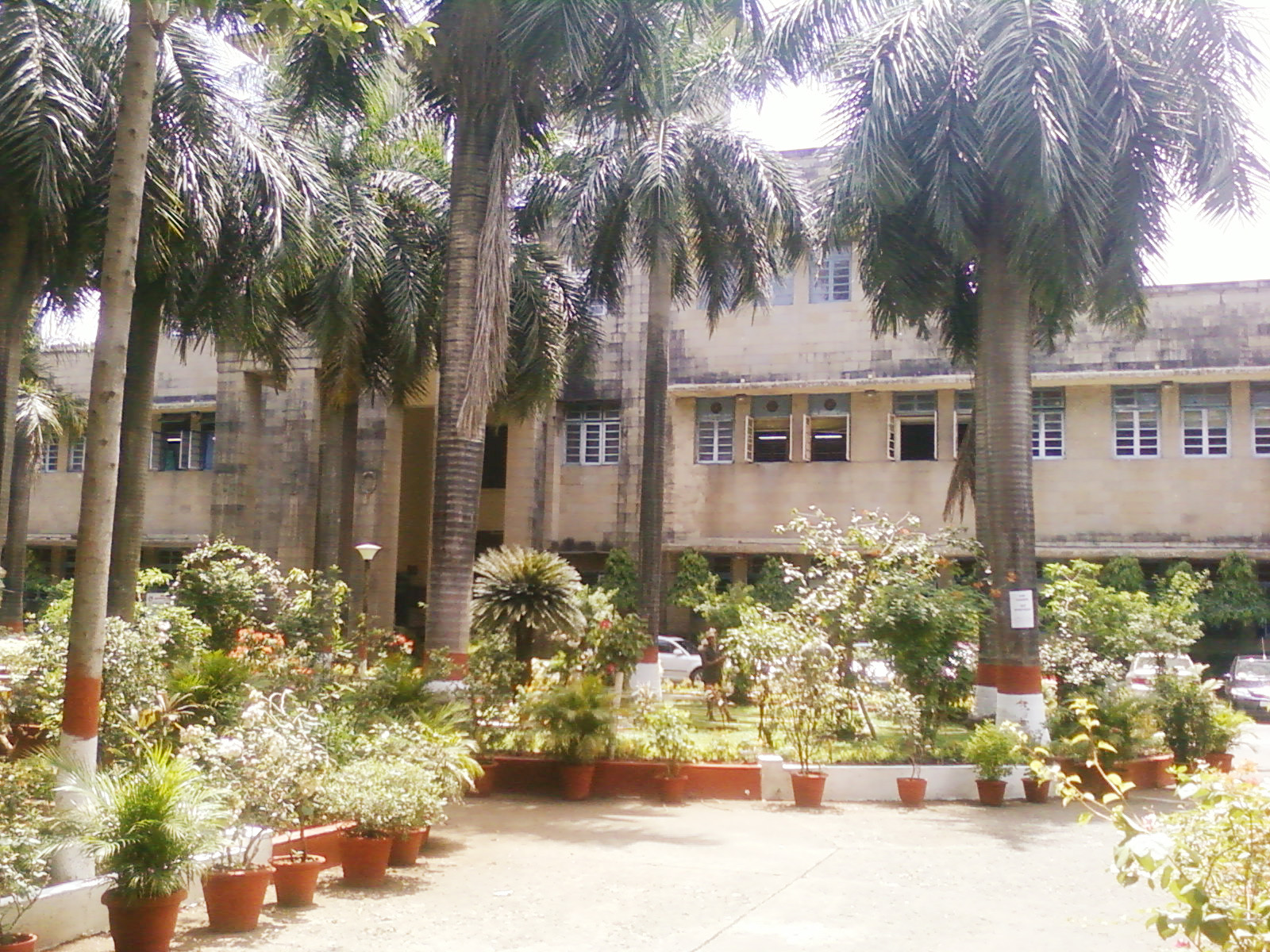
UDCT, Wadala West

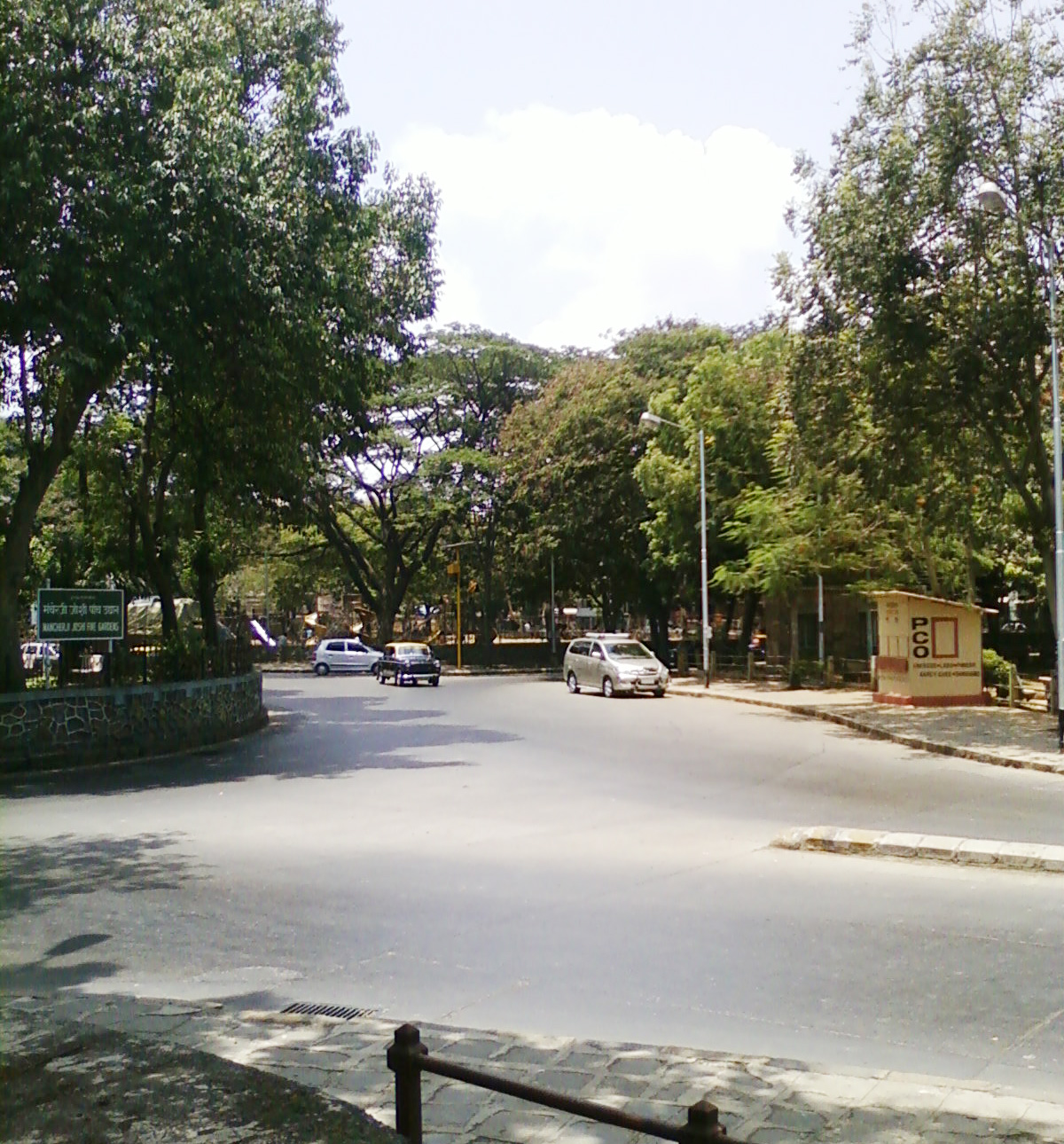
Five Garden Area, Wadala West

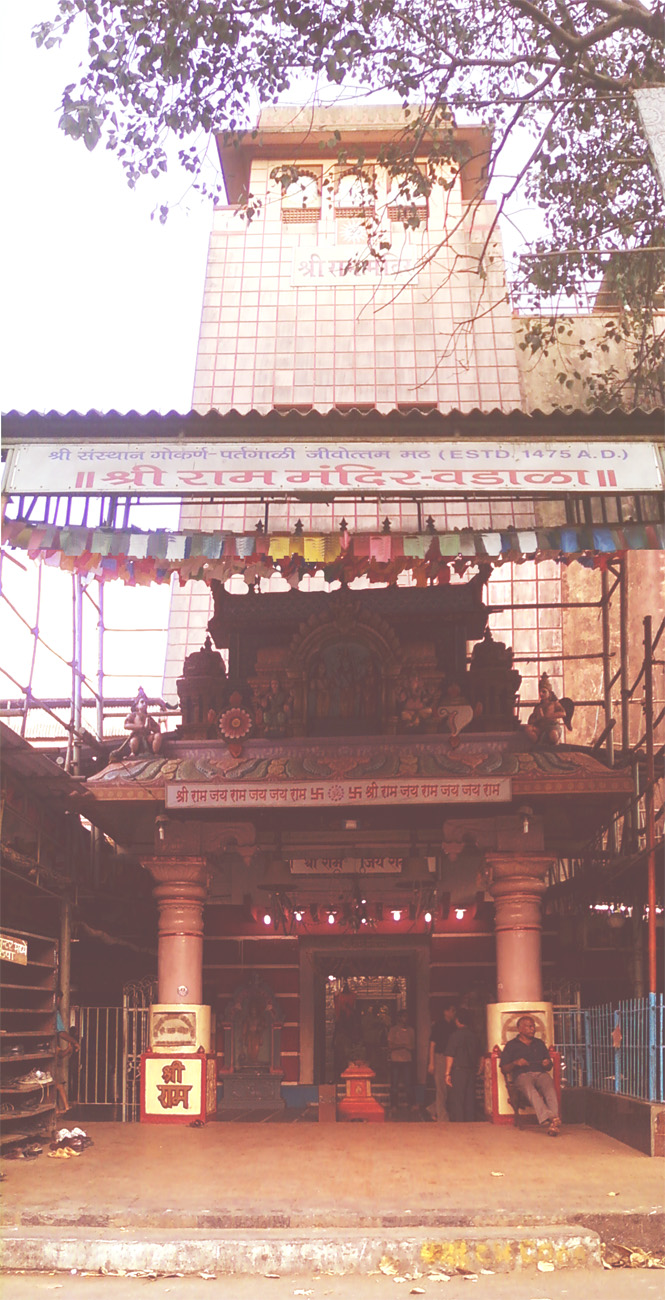
Ram Mandir, Wadala West

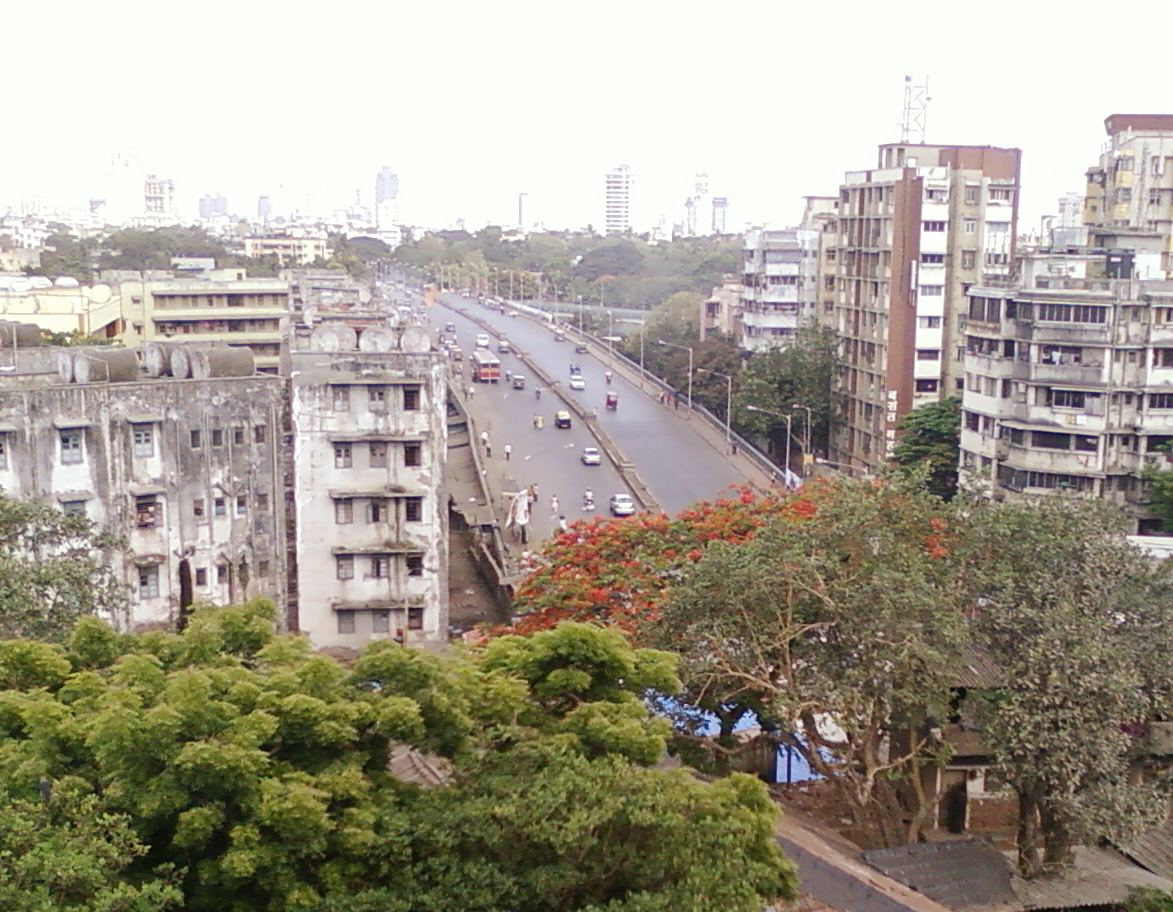
Wadala Bridge (Nana Fadnavis Flyover)

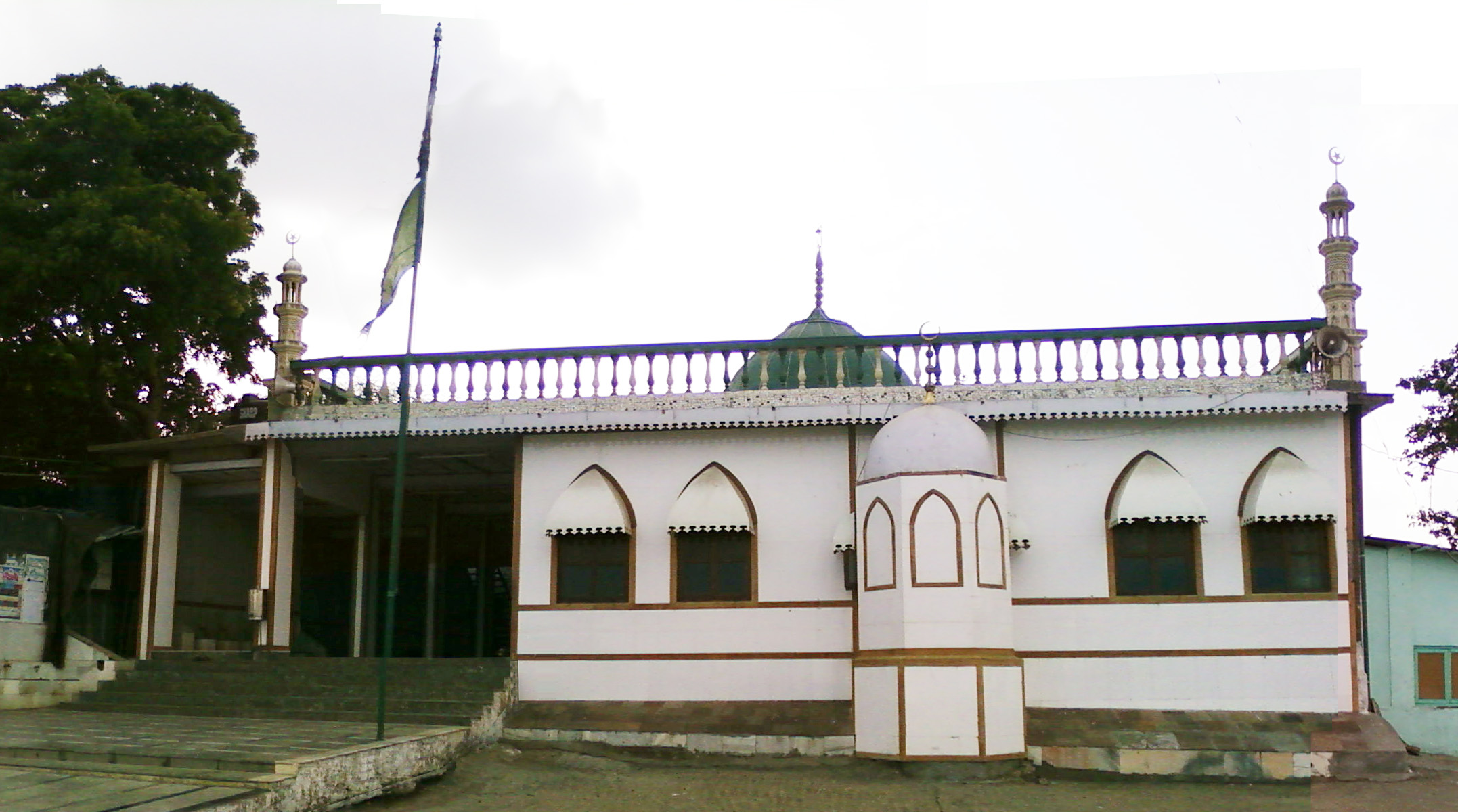
Barkat Ali Dargah, Wadala East

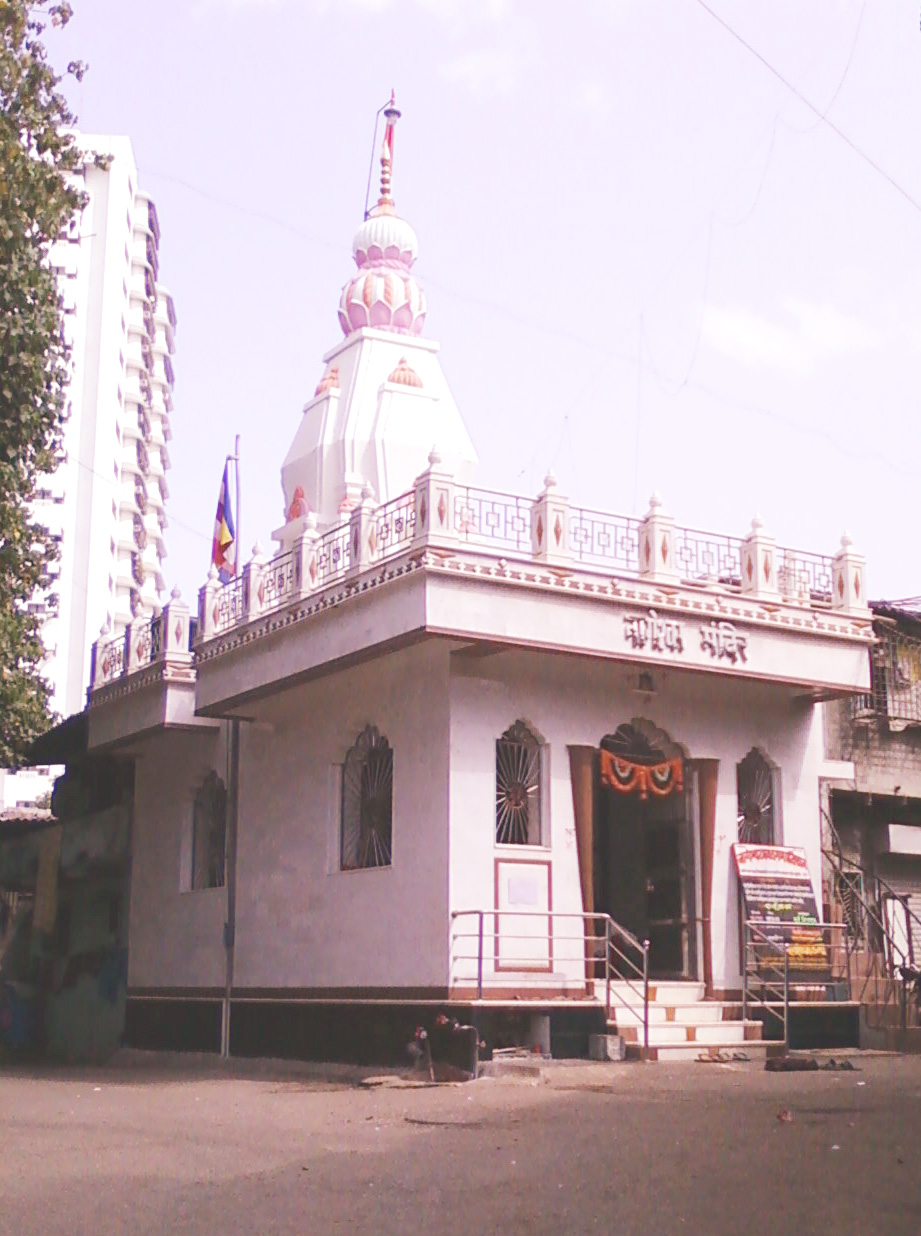
Nageshwar Mandir, Wadala East

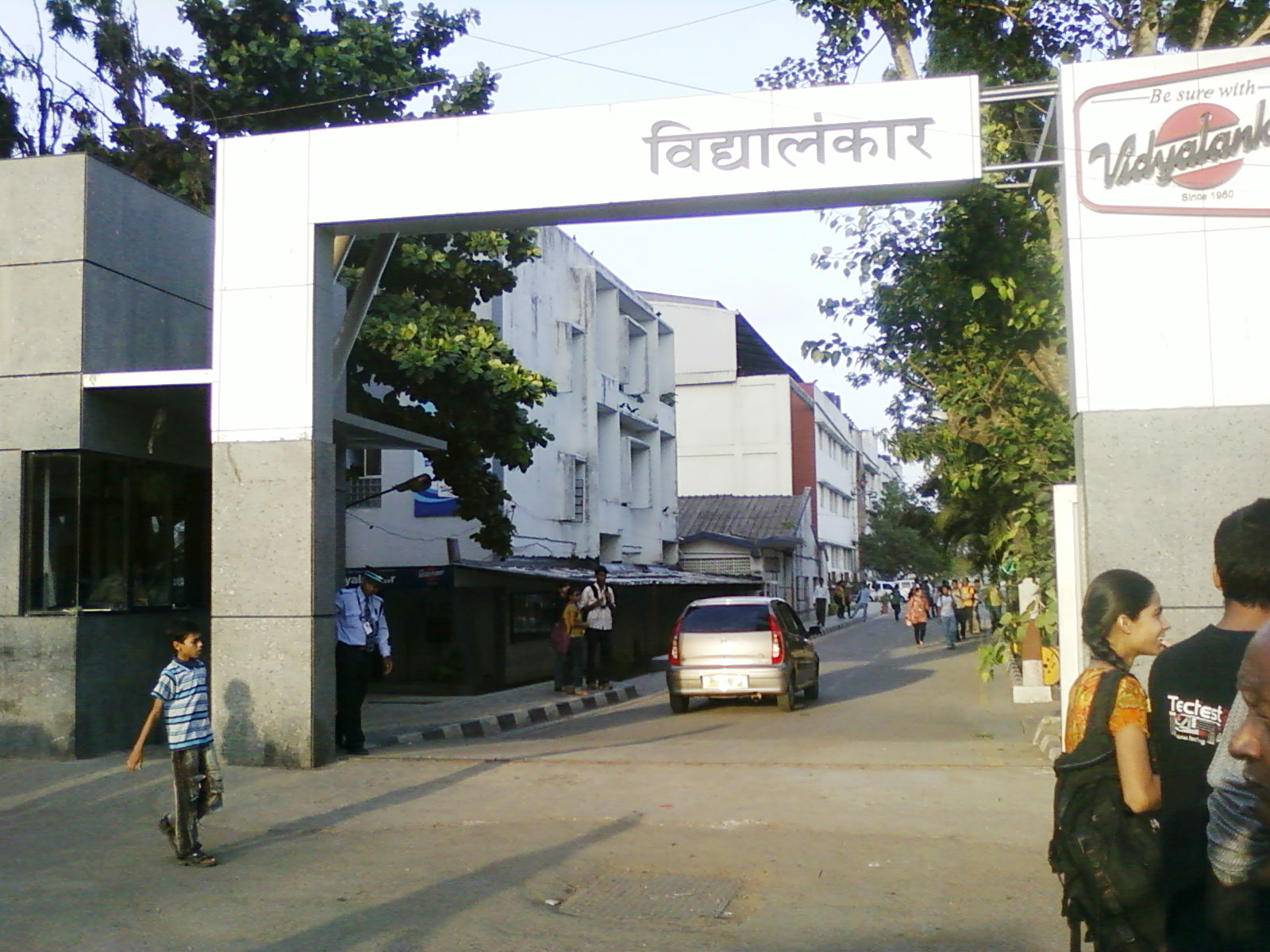
Vidyalankar Educational Campus, Wadala East

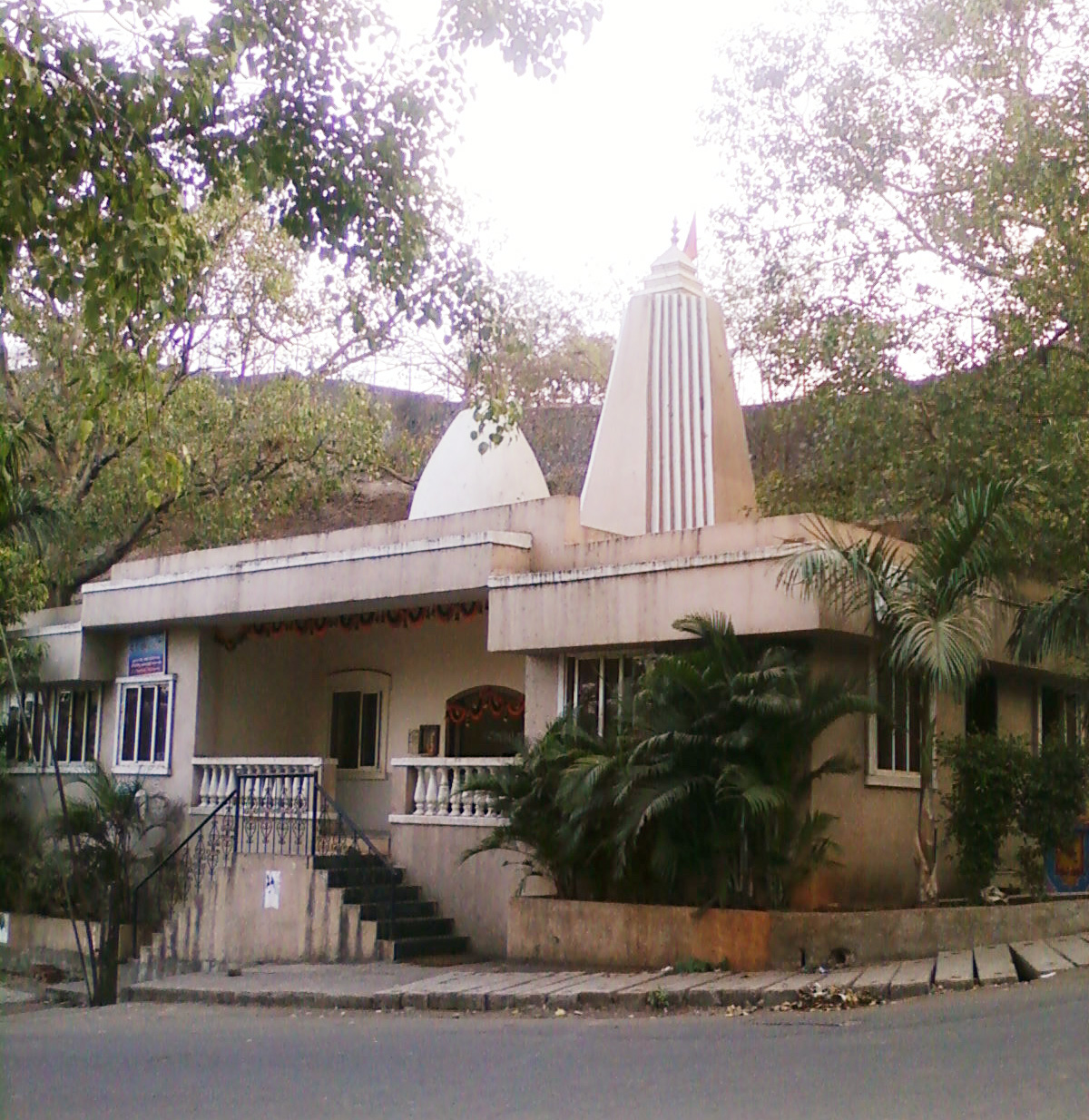
Hanuman Mandir, Wadala East

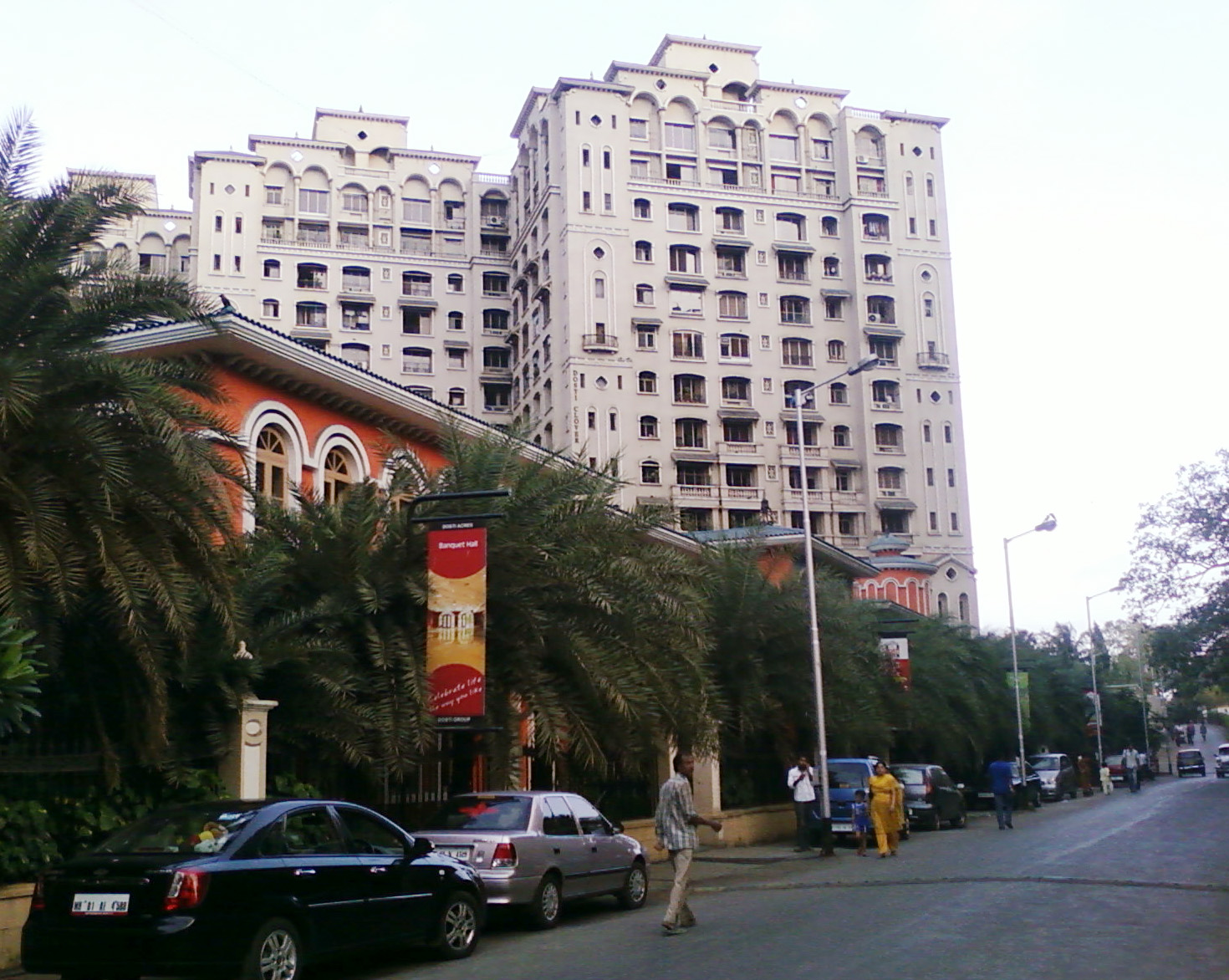
Dosti Acres, Wadala East

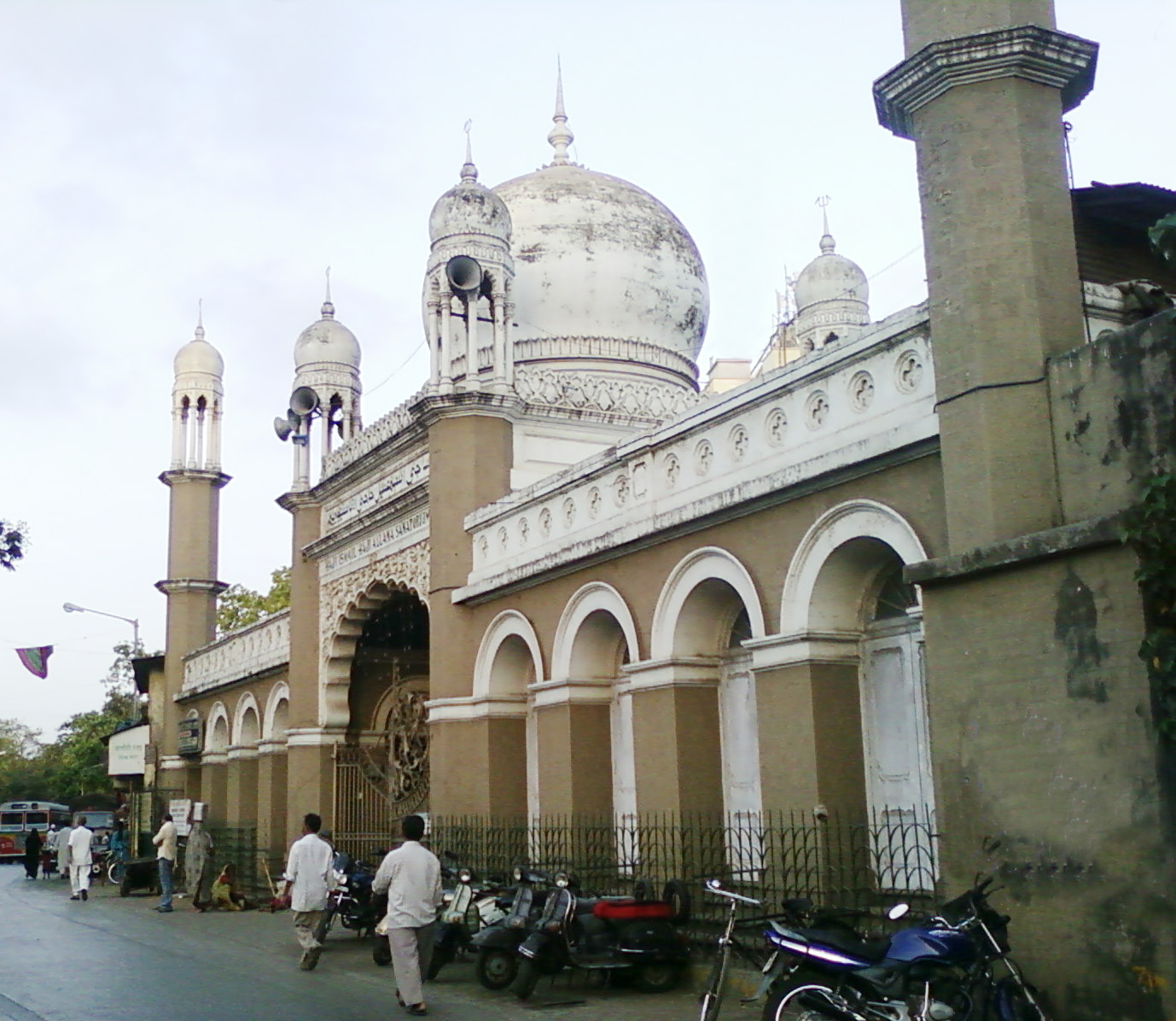
Shaikh Mistry Dargah, Wadala East

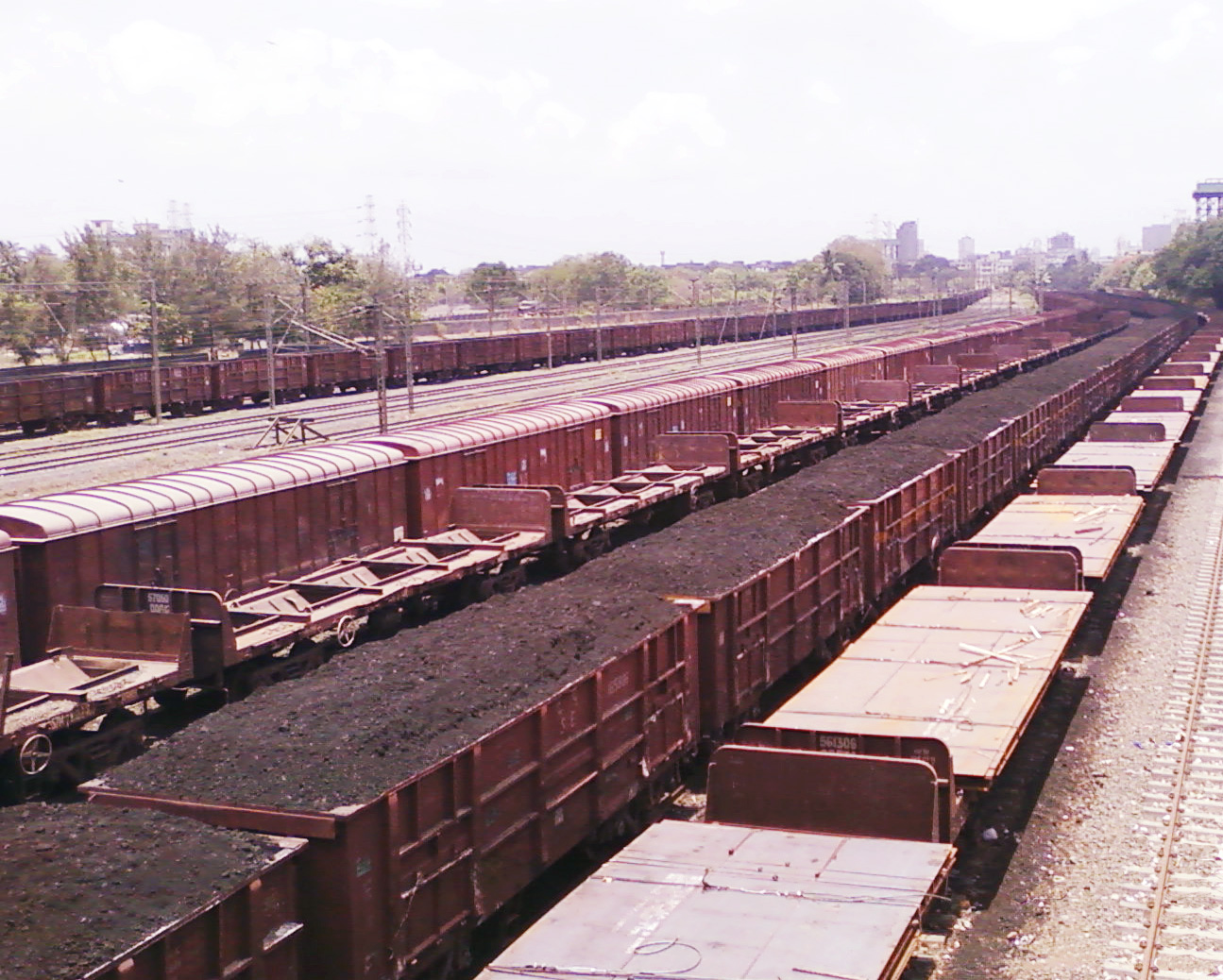
Mumbai Port Trust Railway Yard

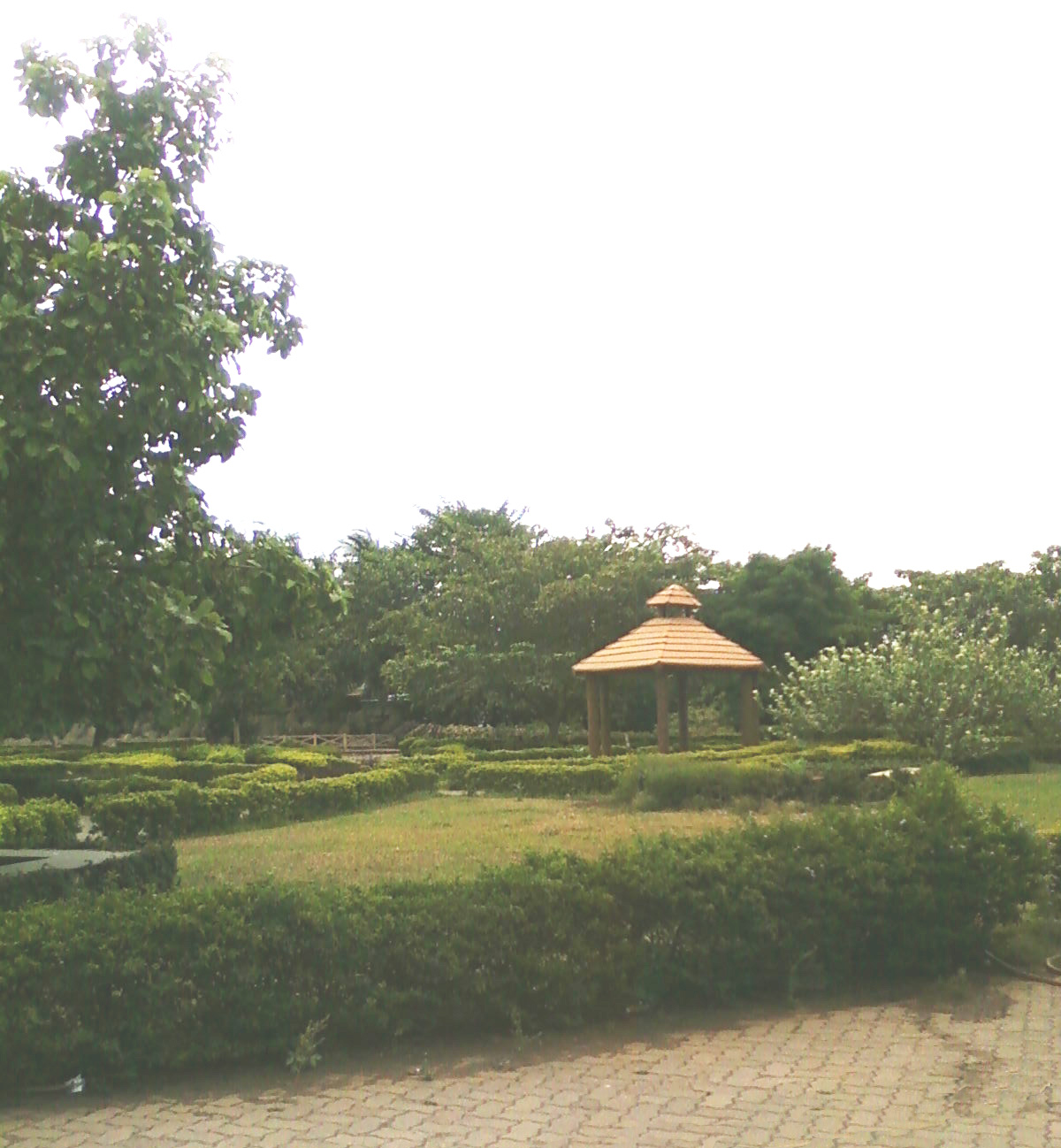
Bhakti Park, Wadala East

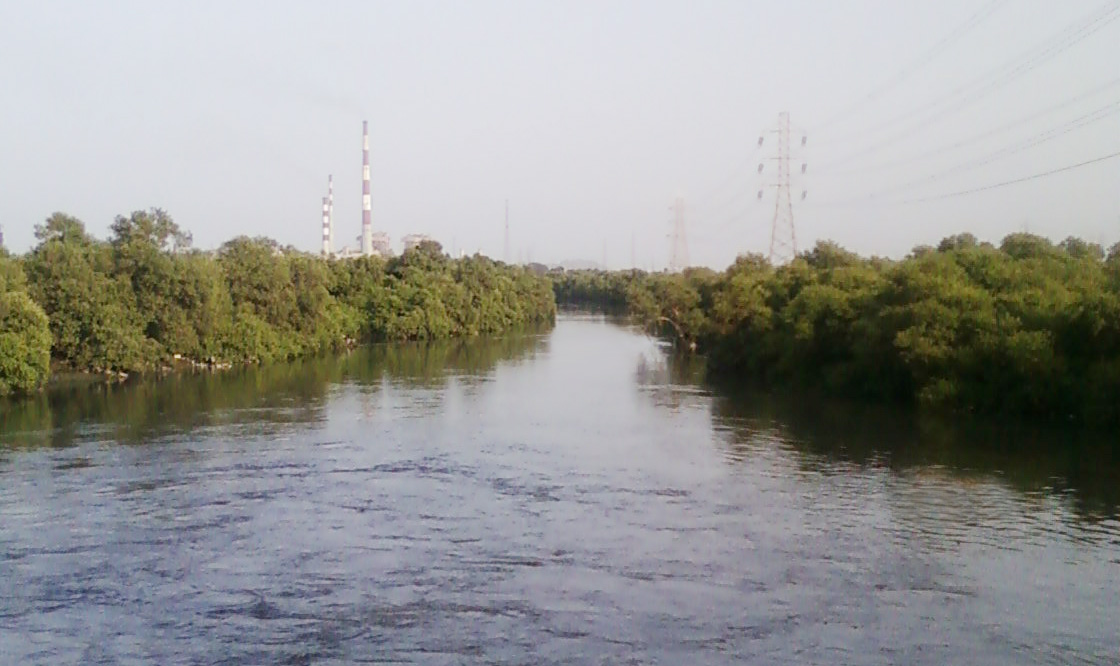
Mangrove Garden, Wadala East

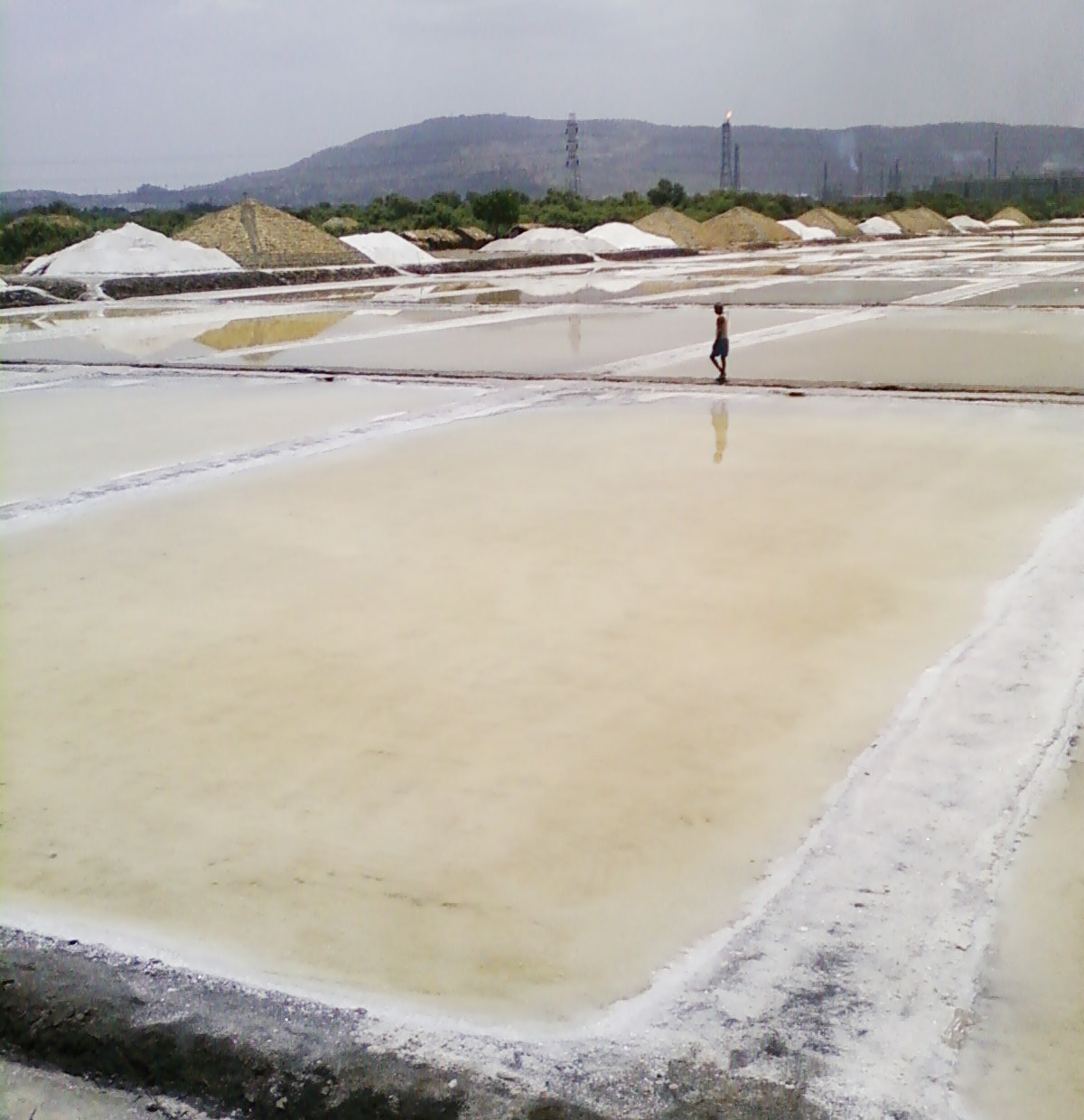
Salt Pan, Wadala East

== See also ==
- Wadala Road
