= Vidyalankar Institute of Technology =

Engineering and technology institution in Mumbai, India

- Motto: Provoked by Intellect, Propelled by values
- Type: Engineering and Technology Institution
- Established: 1999
- Accreditation: NAAC Grade:A+
- Academic affiliations: University of Mumbai and AICTE
- Principal: Dr. Sunil Patekar
- Director: Milind Tadvalkar
- Undergraduates: Intake 660 per year
- Postgraduates: Intake 144 per year
- Location: Wadala, Mumbai, Maharashtra, India; 19.021571°N 72.87077°E
- Campus: Urban, Spread over 11 acres (45,000 m^{2}) in Central Mumbai
- Acronym: VIT
- Mascot: Bull
- Website: vit.edu.in vidyalankarlive.com vitcouncil.com

Vidyalankar Institute of Technology (VIT) is an Autonomous Engineering and Management college approved by the All-India Council for Technical Education (AICTE), New Delhi, Directorate of Technical Education, Maharashtra State and affiliated to the University of Mumbai It was accredited by National Assessment and Accreditation Council in 2019.

Vidyalankar Institute of Technology was started in the year 1999 after having secured permission from the AICTE and University of Mumbai.

Vidyalankar Institute of Technology secured a grade rating of "A" from Mumbai University in 2005.

It has been also the two different other sections of VSIT ( Vidyalankar School of Technology) and Vidyalankar Polytechnic as apart.

== History ==
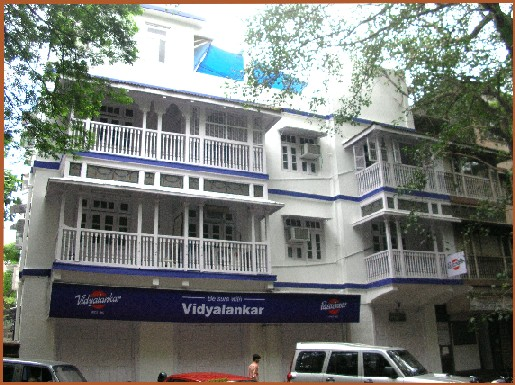
Vidyalankar Classes at Dadar

Established in the year 1999, Vidyalankar Institute of Technology is an autonomous (from A.Y. 2022-23 for period of 10 years) engineering degree and management college.

VIT is managed by Vidyalankar Dnayapeeth Trust.

VIT provides multidisciplinary technical education.

It is approved by the All India Council of Technical Education (AICTE), the Directorate of Technical Education (DTE), Maharashtra state, and affiliated to the University of Mumbai.

VIT received an ‘A’ grade certificate from the Maharashtra State Government in 2005.

Three of its undergraduate programmers are accredited by the National Board of Accreditation for the period of three years with effect from 01 July 2016 and are permanently affiliated to the University of Mumbai, since 2017.

It is the recipient of the Distinguished College Award at TechNet India 2017 (annual academic conference and awards to academia, jointly organized by CSI, Mumbai Chapter in association with Spoken Tutorial- FOSSEE at IIT Bombay).

The institute is also accredited by Tata Consultancy Services.

VIT is also an Academia Partner with L&T Infotech for its ‘Brand Ambassador Programmer’ and has MOU's with leading organizations.

The Institute has been accredited with a CGPA of 3.41 at A+ grade by the National Assessment & Accreditation Council (NAAC) valid for a period of 5 years from 04 March 2019.

== Programs offered ==
VIT currently offers Undergraduate and Postgraduate programs in engineering and management. Following are the details of the programs as of 2023.

=== Undergraduate programs ===
Following are the branches in which the Bachelor of Technology (B.Tech.) degree of University of Mumbai is offered at VIT:

- Bio-Medical Engineering: 60 Seats
- Electronics & Telecommunication Engineering: 120 Seats
- Electronics & Computer Science: 120 Seats
- Information Technology: 180 Seats
- Computer Engineering: 180 Seats

Accreditation: All undergraduate courses (Information Technology, Computer Engineering, Electronics and Computer Science, Electronics & Telecommunication Engineering, and Bio-Medical Engineering are accredited by the National Board of Accreditation.

Accreditation: Accredited A+ by NAAC in the First Cycle with a score of 3.41

=== Graduate programs ===
The college offers a graduate course in MMS (Master of Management Studies), where the degree is conferred by the University of Mumbai. Admission is based on the Maharashtra CET (Common Entrance Test) score. The college also offers a master's program in computer engineering, where the degree is conferred by the University of Mumbai.

- Master of Management Studies: 120 Seats
- M.E (Computer Engineering): 12 Seats
- M.E (Electronics and Telecommunication Engineering): 12 Seats

=== Doctoral programs ===
The college offers a doctoral program in computer engineering. The degree is conferred by the University of Mumbai.

- Ph.D. (Computer Engineering): 10 Seats
- Ph.D. (Electronics & Telecommunication Engineering):10 Seats

== Campus ==
Interiors of Main Building

The campus is located in Wadala (East), a central suburb of Mumbai, and stretches over 11 acres (45,000 m^{2} or 480,000 sq ft) of land. It is close to some residential complexes like Dosti Acres Dosti Eastern Bay and Lloyd's Estate.

The campus comprises 3 buildings, 2 gardens, a football field, a Multipurpose court where volleyball, basketball, throwball, handball is played and also a cricket pitch. A canteen and a café both offer a wide range of food and beverages. Also, separate parking lots are available for students and faculty members, for both 2-wheelers and 4-wheelers (only for faculties).

== Library ==
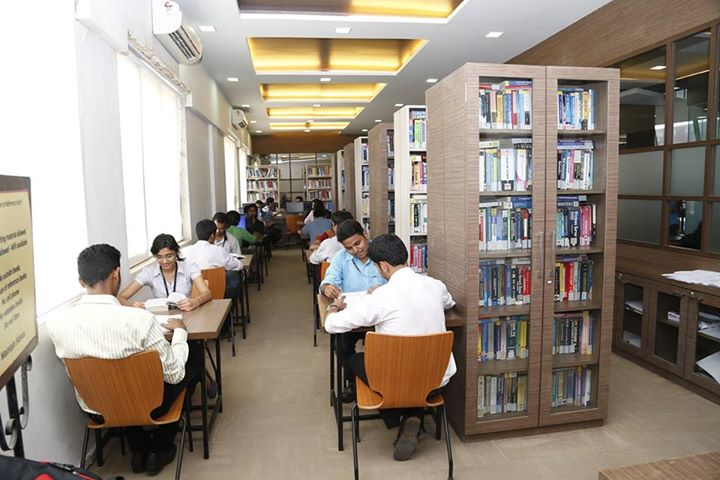
VIT Library

The library provides a wide-ranging collection of books which include university-prescribed textbooks and reference material. The library also subscribes to all major international journals and magazines. Some major non-technical magazines are also subscribed to. The library also has a reading hall which is open 6 days a week and on Sundays when exams are approaching.

Number of books	Number of titles	Number of Non-Academic books
31,308	6,222	1,452

Apart from books, the college also provides students with the facility of using the IEEE/IET electronic library (IEL); an online database, that holds more than 3,796,274 full-text documents.

== Laboratories ==
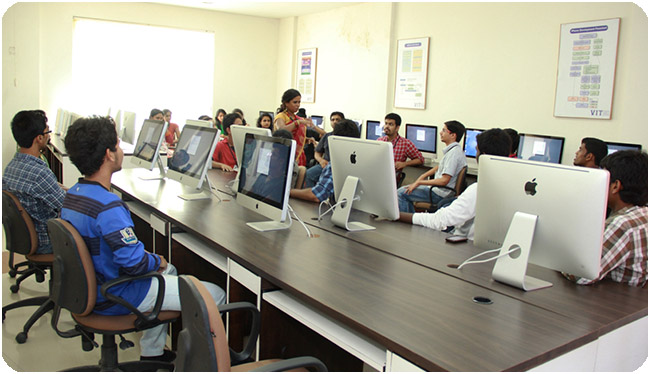
Apple Lab

An entire floor of the main building is reserved for laboratories. They include labs maintained by the 5 departments as well as other core departments such as Applied Sciences and Mechanics departments.

In addition to 12 computer laboratories, the Institute has set up a state-of-the-art 'Central Computing Centre'. An area of 300 sq m is dedicated for the Computer Centre. Apart from IBM-compatible P4 desktops, the Centre has Apple Mac desktops and Sun Blade Workstations. All these computers are networked and backed up with various legal operating systems & application software along with printing & scanning devices.

== Hostel ==
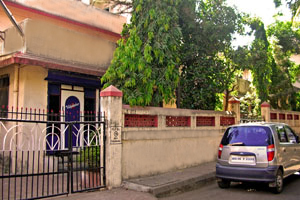
Vidyalankar Hostel

The Vidyalankar Gurkula, a hostel for boys and girls at Nerul, has been run by the Vidyalankar Dnayapeeth Trust since June 1996. A total of 131 students (both boys and girls) reside here. A few of the students are from the western suburbs of Mumbai, while others come from different states of India. The hostel is located near Nerul railway station, in Sector 17.

Amongst other facilities, the hostel also provides computers with internet facilities, a library consisting of academic and general books, and also carrom and chess boards for recreation.

== Achievements and awards ==
- Vidyalankar has won the award for the "Top Institutional Theatre Design in the world" at the Interior Design Best of the Year Awards held on 4 December 2014 at the IAC Building, Manhattan, New York City.
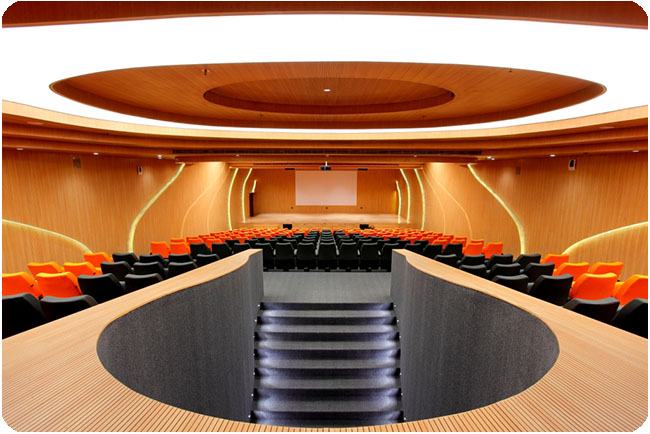
  Vidyalankar Auditorium
  Vidyalankar has won the Honor Award from Design share, New York, USA for its innovative design. The structure boasts of a gateless campus, a man-size chess board, an amphitheater, and a multi-purpose zone for students to chill.
- Infosys has selected Vidyalankar as a partner for its Campus-Connect Program, wherein they train pre-final year Vidyalankar students to make them industry-ready.
- Recently, Vitina's joined hands with the Indian Development Foundation (Formerly the Indian Leprosy Foundation) to spread awareness of Tuberculosis to the masses.
- Vidyalankar Group of Educational Institutes' Friday Paathshala earned recognition nationally by winning a silver in the ‘college contact programme of the year’ category at the 1st WOW Event and Experiential Awards.

== Student life ==
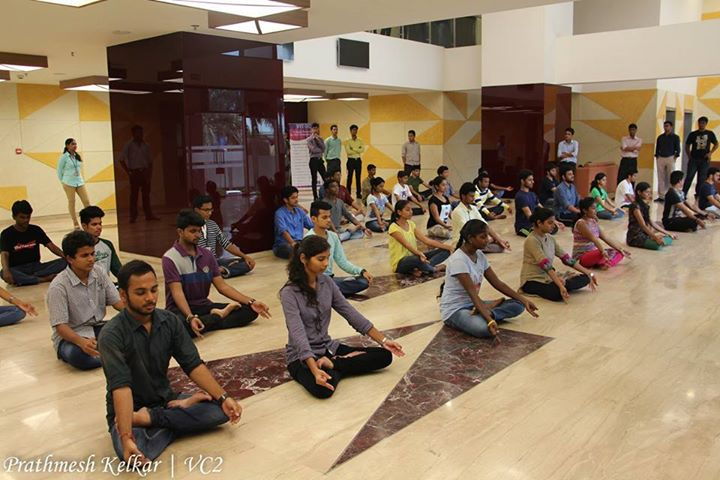
Yoga Session at VIT

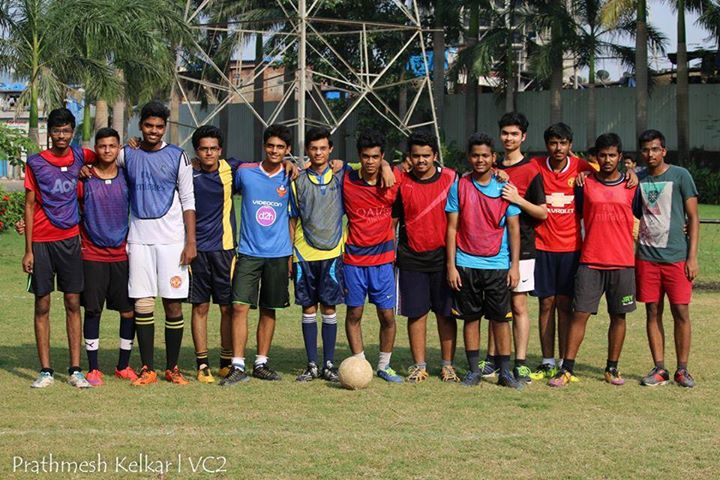
Football match at VIT

The college has student chapters of various international organizations. It has also set up various development and interaction cells to help students decide on the path they want to take in the future. The college's annual festivals are organized in the summer semester while smaller events are conducted throughout the year by the student organizations.

=== Student chapters ===
- Association for Computing Machinery, ACM
- CSI
- ISTE
- IEI
- BMESI-VIT Chapter

Vidyalankar Institute of Technology's Computer Society of India (CSI-VIT) Student Chapter was conferred with the prestigious "Best Accredited Student Branch" Award for 2015-16 at the CSI Annual Convention 2016. The Institute's CSI Chapter won the "Best Accredited Student Branch" Award for 2013-14, in the past.

- IEEE
- IETE

=== Student cells ===
- Research and Development Cell
- Entrepreneurship Development Cell
- Industry Institute Interaction Cell

=== Student organizations ===
- Academic:
  - SC - Student Council
  - EESA - Electronics Students' Association
  - ETSA - Electronics and Telecommunications Students' Association
  - ITSA - Information Technology Students' Association
  - BMSA - Bio-Medical Students' Association
  - CESA - Computer Education Students' Association
- Non-academic:
  - Hobby Club Committee
  - Sports Council
  - Women Development Committee
  - Vidyalankar Service Scheme
  - Personality Enrichment Committee
  - VIT Volunteering Committee
- Administrative Committees
  - Anti Ragging Committee
  - Admission Committee
  - Alumni Committee
  - Career Counselling Committee
  - Laboratory Development Committee
  - Library Committee
  - Parent Interaction Committee (PIC)
  - Placement Committee
  - Value Added Services
  - Corporate Communication
  - Final Year Projects Quality Assurance Committee
  - Food and Beverages Committee
  - Staff Development Committee
  - Staff Welfare Committee

=== Annual festivals ===
- An intra-collegiate cultural festival called VERVE is held in February every year. Some events like Dance Competitions, Fashion Shows, and War of the DJs are held on an inter-collegiate level. It also includes events like Antashia, Ad-Mad show, Press Conference etc.
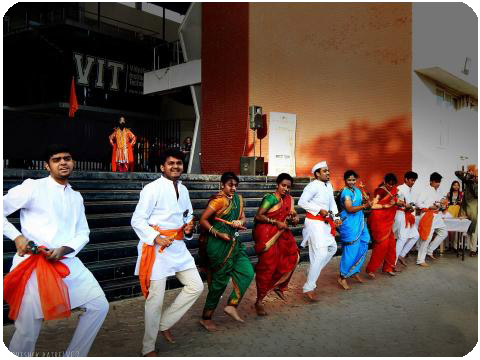
  Marathi Diwas
  An inter-collegiate technical festival called Tantra Vihar is held in April/May every year. Registrations for various events open in mid-March. Events include Robotics, Technical Paper Presentations, Debates, Quizzes, Open Software competitions, Stock Market Simulation competitions etc.
- Every February, an inter-collegiate sports festival is held on the college campus, including both indoor and outdoor sports. The highlight of the festival is the S6 (Six a side - Six overs) cricket tournament in which more than 15 colleges participate. It also includes intra-collegiate competitions in volleyball, box-cricket, throwball, carrom, chess etc.

=== V-Express ===
V-Express is the official annual magazine published by the college. The issue usually comes out in the month of April. The magazine is created by the Student Council of VIT while the editing staff consists of the Literary Council team.

=== Friday Paata-Shala ===
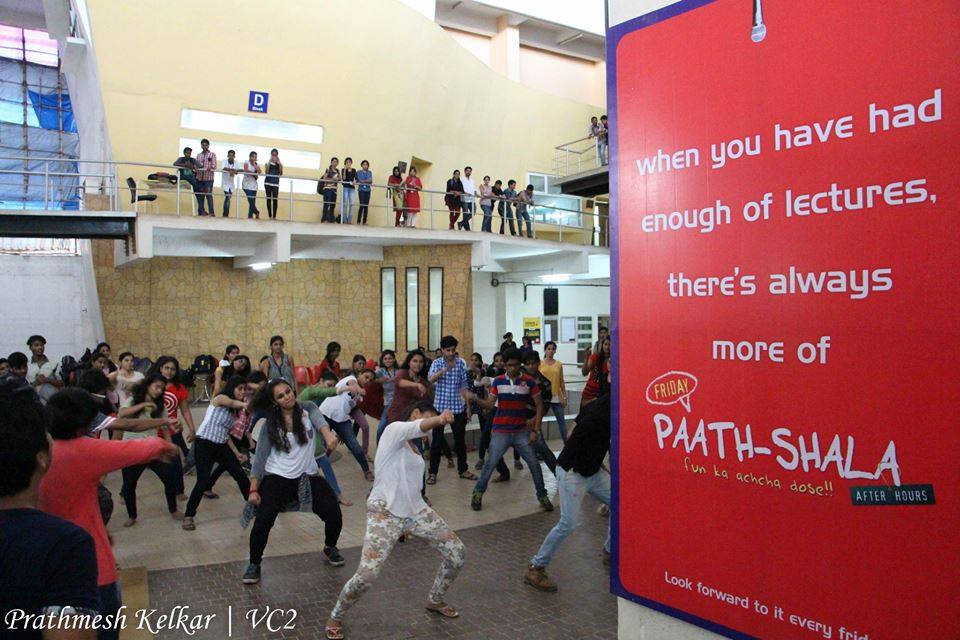
Dance Show at VIT

Friday Paata-Shala is a platform created for students to indulge in their non-academic passions & pursuits. This ranges from dance workshops to screening thought-provoking movies and debates to musical jams where students bring their favourite musical instruments. The allotted time is every Friday between 4.30 pm to 6.30 pm and the venue is the amphitheatre.

Vidyalankar Group of Educational Institute’s ‘Friday Paata-Shala’ earned recognition nationally by winning a silver in the ‘college contact programme of the year’ category at the 1st WOW Event and Experiential Awards.

‘Friday Paathshala’ from being a single college activity has now extended out to all engineering colleges in Mumbai and have involved them in an annual S6 cricket tournament (6 a side, 6 over each). The S6 cricket carnival is now 2 editions old and is becoming a landmark sports event in the annual sports calendar of engineering colleges.

== Location ==
The Vidyalankar campus is situated in Wadala (E) in Central Mumbai, 1 kilometer away from Wadala Road Station. It is located on Vidyalankar College Marg next to residential complexes, Dosti Acres and Lloyd's Estate. The campus is also bordered by the Antop Hill Warehouse company.

== See also ==
- University of Mumbai
- List of Mumbai Colleges
- Wadala
