= T. H. Musthafa =

Indian politician (1941–2024)

Member Kerala Legislative Assembly
- In office 1977, 1982, 1987, 1991, 2001
- Constituency: Aluva and Kunnathunadu

Minister for Food and Civil Supplies
- In office 1991-1995
- Preceded by: E.Chandrashekharan Nair
- Succeeded by: K.K. Ramachandran master

Personal details
- Born: 7 December 1941 Vazhakulam, Ernakulam District, Cochin, India
- Died: 14 January 2024 (aged 82) Kochi, Kerala, India
- Spouse: Rifka Beegum
- Children: 6 sons and 2 daughters
- As of 24 January, 2021 Source: [Kerala Legislative Assembly]

T. H. Musthafa (7 December 1941 – 14 January 2024) was an Indian politician who served as the Food Minister of Kerala from 1991 to 1995 while Karunakaran was the Chief Minister. He was a five-time legislator belonging to the Indian National Congress. Musthafa died on 14 January 2024, at the age of 82.

== Early life ==
T. H. Musthafa was born and brought up in a Muslim family named "Thottathil Kottappurath". He did his primary school education in his village and neighbourhoods. His grandfather and family were appointed the tax collector of old royal family of central Travancore. His family name is considered one of the oldest and most traditional families of the state. Traditionally, they farmed to provide income for the family. His grandfather was a farmer and landlord.

Musthafa completed high school in 1965. He discontinued his studies due to lack of good schools in his neighbourhoods.

== Political career ==
Musthafa started his party leadership at age 16 as per party records. He was a closest ally and loyalist of Indira Gandhi and Rajiv Gandhi. His political career was affected after their assassination.

Positions held

- 1957–1960 Youth Congress Mandalam President Vazhakulam
- 1962–1964 Youth Congress Perumbavoor Block President
- 1962–1965 Youth Congress Ernakulam District Gen. Secretary
- 1964–1968 President Perumbavoor Block Congress Committee
- 1966–1968 Gen. Secretary Ernakulam DCC
- 1968–1978 President Ernakulam DCC
- 1978–1983 Gen. Secretary KPCC
- 1982, 1984 Deputy Leader Congress Legislative Party
- 1982–1986 Vice Chairman Kerala Khadi Industries Board
- 1983–1997 Vice President KPCC
- Kerala Legislative Assembly Member (MLA) 1977
- Kerala Legislative Assembly Member (MLA) 1982
- Kerala Legislative Assembly Member (MLA) 1987
- Kerala Legislative Assembly Member (MLA) 1991
- 1991–1995 Minister Food and Civil Supplies
- Kerala Legislative Assembly Member (MLA) 2001

Musthafa had served more than 60 years in the Indian National Congress by the time of his death. The book related to his long political career in Congress was published by A.K. Antony.

Musthafa was the captain of Raj bhavan March from Manjeshwaram to Raj bhavan Trivandrum covering a total distance of more than 1572 kilometres by foot.

Musthafa was elected as DCC (District Congress committee) president for 14 years in Cochin. He got selected as KPCC vice president, AICC member and prestigious party leadership in Indian National Congress (INC). K. Karunakaran and Musthafa made the base for Congress in Kerala at the time of party split, Indira Gandhi was their direct reports to Delhi.

His family includes social activists, farmers, engineers, doctors, management professionals as their profession. One of his brothers Sri. T.H. Abdul Jabbar served as the president of Vazakulam grama panchayath during 2010–2015. one of his son Sri. Zakeer Hussin made the municipal chairman of Perumbavoor during 2021-2023. Shri. Musthafa became MLA for the first time in 1977, from Aluva constituency, as a Congress candidate. He was again elected as MLA in 1982, 1987, 1991 and 2001 from Kunnathunadu constituency. He lost elections at Aluva in 1980 and Kunnathunadu in 1996.

Musthafa served as the head for several Kerala government organizations including Kerala state khadi board Lmtd., Rubber Marketing board Lmtd., CIAL (Cochin International airport limited), etc. Noted educated IAS, IPS, IFS, IRS officers served Musthafa in his entire political career. Rather than his educational qualifications, Musthafa was considered a go-getter and trendmaker politician of Kerala.
