= Keezhmad =

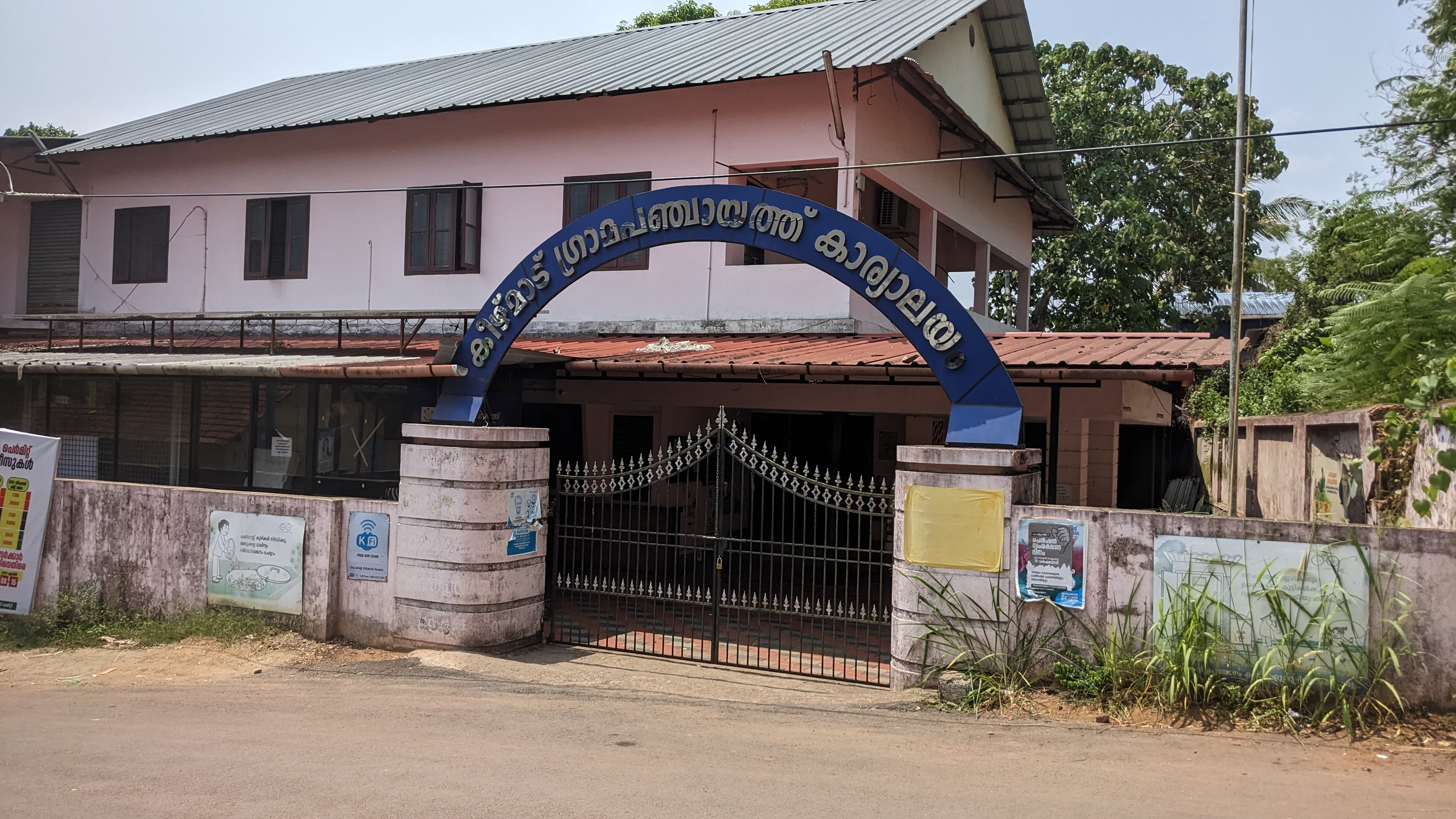
Keezhmad Panchayath Office

Keezhmad is a village in Aluva. It is located 3 km from Aluva town, between the parallel Aluva – Perumbavoor roads, the KSRTC route along the Periyar river and "private" route that passes through Choondy and Chunangamveli. It is also the headquarter of the namesake Gramapanchayath in Ernakulam district in the state of Kerala, India. Keezhmad is home to several educational institutions, including Christava Mahilalayam Girls High School, Crescent Public School, Shivagiri Public school and a school for the blind. Keezhmad is connected with adjacent places like Aluva Town and Perumbavoor by major roads. TCS Ion – the digital exam centre for central government exam are situated in keezhmad. Proposed Sea port air port high way is passed through the heart of Keezhmad. Kerala State Road Transport Corporation (KSRTC) operates regular services through this area in the circular form.

Keezhmad is surrounded by green foliage and paddy fields. The fertile land of Keezhmad is used for crops including rice, rubber and coconut. The proximity of Periyar River, the lifeline of Kerala, makes the land fertile.
