= List of Mumbai Suburban Railway stations =

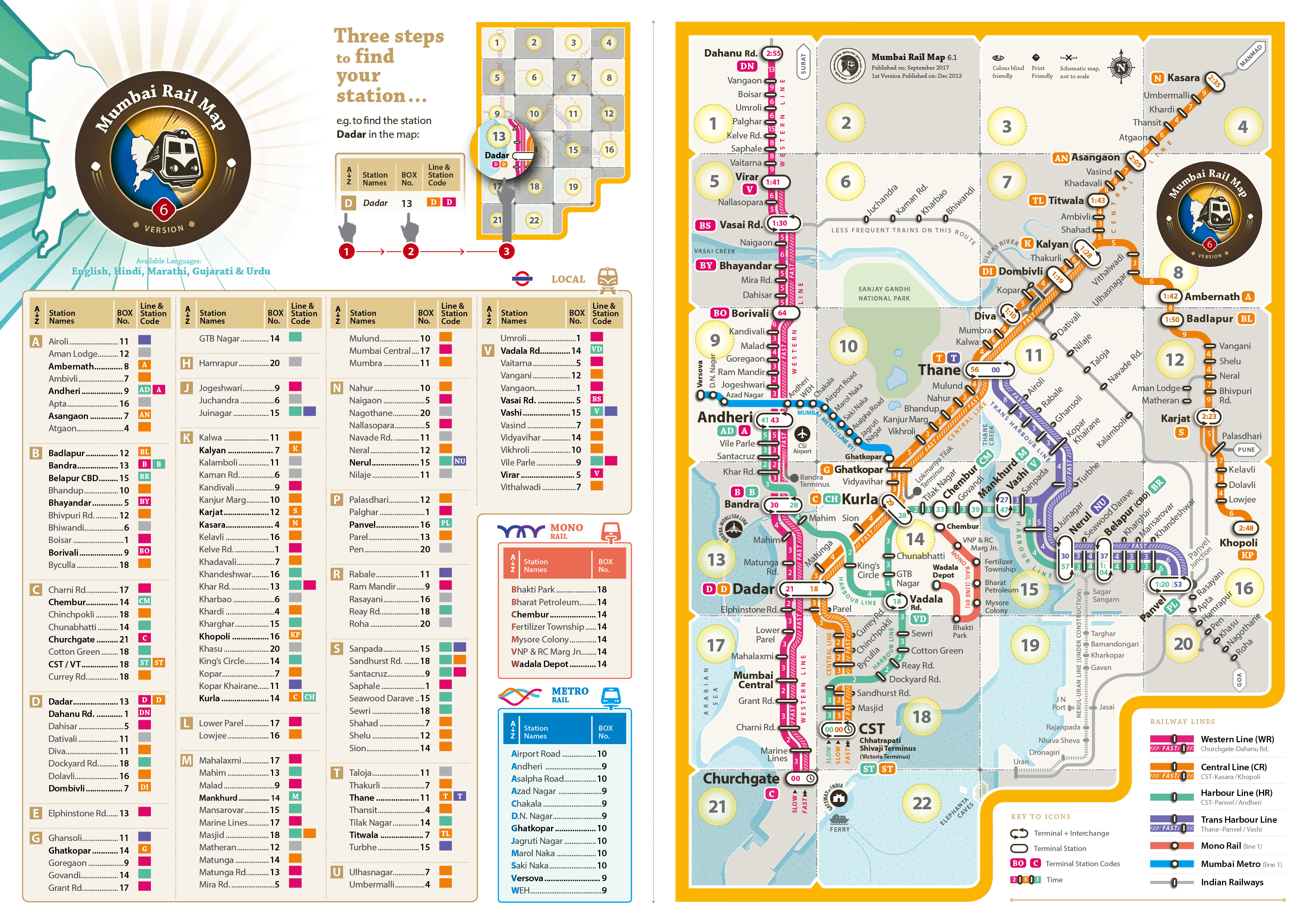
Complete map with index for Mumbai suburban rail network in English

This is a List of stations of the Mumbai Suburban Railway, a suburban rail system serving the Mumbai Metropolitan Region in Maharashtra, India. The system is operated by Western Railway and Central Railway. Modeled on the London Underground system, the Mumbai Suburban Railway first opened in 1853, making it the first suburban railway system in India.

Each route contains "slow" and "fast" tracks. "Slow" tracks are dedicated tracks for suburban trains, while "fast" tracks are shared with long-distance trains operated by Indian Railways. Some railway stations on the network serve both suburban as well as long-distance trains.

The Mumbai Suburban Railway comprises a major 7 lines – Western Line, Central Line, Harbour Line, Trans-Harbour Line, Port Line, Vasai Road–Roha Line and Panvel-Karjat Line. Each of these corridors may consist of additional lines that may intersect with each other. The system uses rolling stock of broad gauge. The railway system is open from 4 AM to 1 AM and has an average daily ridership of 8 million commuters.

== Stations ==
†	Terminal station
*	Transfer station (excluding transfer to Indian Railways)
†*	Terminal and transfer station to other lines

Station Name		Station Code		Line	Fast train stop (Note: Fast train stop indicates that fast services on the Mumbai Suburban Railway halt at this station. Except Central and Western Line, Other line services are slow.)	Long Distance (Note: Long Distance indicates that trains other than local trains halt at this station. These trains are usually part of the Indian Railways network.)	District	Notes
English	Marathi	Suburban	Mainline	Line	Fast train stop	Long Distance	District	Notes
Airoli	ऐरोली		AIRL	Trans-Harbour line	X mark	X mark	Thane	
Aman Lodge	अमन लॉज		ANLG	Matheran Hill Railway	X mark	X mark	Raigad	
Ambarnath	अंबरनाथ	A	ABH	Central line	check	X mark	Thane	
Ambivli	आंबिवली		ABY	Central line	X mark	X mark	Thane	
Andheri	अंधेरी	A/AD	ADH	Western line Harbour line	check	check	Mumbai Suburban	
Apta	आपटा		APTA	Vasai Road–Roha line	X mark	X mark	Raigad	
Asangaon	आसनगाव	AN	ASO	Central line	check	X mark	Thane	
Atgaon	आटगाव		ATG	Central line	X mark	X mark	Thane	
Badlapur	बदलापूर	BL	BUD	Central line	check	X mark	Thane	
Bamandongri	बामणडोंगरी		BMDR	Port line	X mark	X mark	Raigad	
Bandra	वांद्रे	B	BA	Western line Harbour line	check	X mark	Mumbai Suburban	
Bandra Terminus	वांद्रे टर्मिनस		BDTS	Western line	X mark	check	Mumbai Suburban	
Bhandup	भांडुप		BND	Central line	check	X mark	Mumbai Suburban	
Bhayandar	भाईंदर	BY	BYR	Western line	check	X mark	Thane	
Bhivpuri Road	भिवपुरी रोड		BVS	Central line	X mark	X mark	Raigad	
Bhiwandi Road	भिवंडी रोड		BIRD	Vasai Road–Roha line	X mark	check	Thane	
Boisar	बोईसर		BOR	Western line	X mark	X mark	Palghar	
Borivali	बोरीवली	BO	BVI	Western line	check	check	Mumbai Suburban	Harbour line (under construction)
Byculla	भायखळा	BY		Central line	check	X mark	Mumbai City	
CBD Belapur	सी.बी.डी. बेलापूर	BR	BEPR	Harbour line Port line	X mark	X mark	Thane	
Charni Road	चर्नी रोड		CYR	Western line	X mark	X mark	Mumbai City	
Chembur	चेंबूर	CM	CMBR	Harbour line	X mark	X mark	Mumbai Suburban	
Chhatrapati Shivaji Maharaj Terminus	छत्रपती शिवाजी महाराज टर्मिनस	ST	CSMT	Central line Harbour line	check	check	Mumbai City	
Chikhale	चिखले		CKHS	Panvel-Karjat Railway Corridor	X mark	X mark	Raigad	
Chikhloli	चिखलोली		CHLI	Central line	X mark	X mark	Thane	under construction
Chinchpokli	चिंचपोकळी		CHG	Central line	X mark	X mark	Mumbai City	
Chouk	चौक		CHOK	Panvel-Karjat Railway Corridor	X mark	X mark	Raigad	
Chunabhatti	चुनाभट्टी		CHF	Harbour line	X mark	X mark	Mumbai Suburban	
Churchgate	चर्चगेट	C	CCG	Western line	check	X mark	Mumbai City	
Cotton Green	कॉटन ग्रीन		CTGN	Harbour line	X mark	X mark	Mumbai City	
Currey Road	करी रोड		CRD	Central line	X mark	X mark	Mumbai City	
Dadar	दादर	D	DR/DDR	Central line Western line	check	check	Mumbai City	
Dahanu Road	डहाणू रोड	DN	DRD	Western line	check	X mark	Palghar	
Dahisar	दहिसर		DIC	Western line	X mark	X mark	Mumbai Suburban	
Dativali	दातिवली		DTVL	Vasai Road–Roha line	X mark	X mark	Thane	
Digha Gaon	दिघा गाव		DIGH	Trans-Harbour line	X mark	X mark	Thane	
Diva Junction	दिवा जंक्शन	DW	DIVA	Central line Vasai Road–Roha line	check	check	Thane	
Dockyard Road	डॉकयार्ड रोड		DKRD	Harbour line	X mark	X mark	Mumbai City	
Dolavli	डोळवली		DLV	Central line	X mark	X mark	Raigad	
Dombivli	डोंबिवली	DI		Central line	check	X mark	Thane	
Dronagiri	द्रोणागिरी		DRGI	Port line	X mark	X mark	Raigad	
Gavan	गव्हाण		GAVN	Port line	X mark	X mark	Raigad	
Ghansoli	घणसोली		GNSL	Trans-Harbour line	X mark	X mark	Thane	
Ghatkopar	घाटकोपर	G	GC	Central line	check	X mark	Mumbai Suburban	
Goregaon	गोरेगाव	G/GO	GMN	Western line Harbour line	check	X mark	Mumbai Suburban	
Govandi	गोवंडी		GV	Harbour line	X mark	X mark	Mumbai Suburban	
Grant Road	ग्रँट रोड		GTR	Western line	X mark	X mark	Mumbai City	
Guru Tegh Bahadur Nagar	गुरु तेग बहादुर नगर		GTBN	Harbour line	X mark	X mark	Mumbai Suburban	
Hamrapur	हमरापूर		HMRR	Vasai Road–Roha line	X mark	X mark	Raigad	
Jite	जिते		JITE	Vasai Road–Roha line	X mark	X mark	Raigad	
Jogeshwari	जोगेश्वरी		JOS	Western line Harbour line	X mark	X mark	Mumbai Suburban	
Juchandra	जुचंद्र		JCNR	Vasai Road–Roha line	X mark	X mark	Palghar	
Juinagar	जुईनगर		JNJ	Harbour line Trans-Harbour line	X mark	X mark	Thane	
Jummapatti	जुम्मापट्टी		JTT	Matheran Hill Railway	X mark	X mark	Raigad	
Kalamboli	कळंबोली		KLMC	Vasai Road–Roha line	X mark	X mark	Raigad	
Kalwa	कळवा		KLVA	Central line	X mark	X mark	Thane	
Kalyan Junction	कल्याण जंक्शन	K	KYN	Central line	check	check	Thane	
Kaman Road	कामण रोड		KARD	Vasai Road–Roha line	X mark	X mark	Palghar	
Kandivli	कांदिवली		KILE	Western line	X mark	X mark	Mumbai Suburban	Harbour line (under construction)
Kanjur Marg	कांजुर मार्ग		KJRD	Central line	X mark	X mark	Mumbai Suburban	
Karjat	कर्जत	S	KJT	Central line Panvel-Karjat Railway Corridor	check	check	Raigad	
Kasara	कसारा	N	KSRA	Central line	check	check	Thane	
Kasu	कासू		KASU	Vasai Road–Roha line	X mark	X mark	Raigad	
Kelavli	केळवली		KLY	Central line	X mark	X mark	Raigad	
Kelve Road	केळवे रोड		KLV	Western line	X mark	X mark	Palghar	
Khadavli	खडावली		KDV	Central line	X mark	X mark	Thane	
Khandeshwar	खांदेश्वर		KNDS	Harbour line	X mark	X mark	Raigad	
Khar Road	खार रोड		KHAR	Western line Harbour line	X mark	X mark	Mumbai Suburban	
Kharbav	खारबाव		KHBV	Vasai Road–Roha line	X mark	X mark	Thane	
Khardi	खर्डी		KE	Central line	X mark	X mark	Thane	
Kharghar	खारघर		KHAG	Harbour line	X mark	X mark	Raigad	
Kharkopar	खारकोपर	KR	KARP	Port line	X mark	X mark	Raigad	
Khopoli	खोपोली	KP	KHPI	Central line	check	X mark	Raigad	
King's Circle	किंग्ज सर्कल		KCE	Harbour line	X mark	X mark	Mumbai Suburban	
Kopar	कोपर		KOPR	Central line Vasai Road–Roha line	X mark	X mark	Thane	
Koparkhairane	कोपरखैरणे		KPHN	Trans-Harbour line	X mark	X mark	Thane	
Kurla	कुर्ला	C	CLA	Central line Harbour line	check	X mark	Mumbai Suburban	
Lokmanya Tilak Terminus	लोकमान्य टिळक टर्मिनस		LTT	Central line	X mark	check	Mumbai Suburban	
Lower Parel	लोअर परळ		PL	Western line	X mark	X mark	Mumbai City	
Lowjee	लौजी		LWJ	Central line	X mark	X mark	Raigad	
Mahalaxmi	महालक्ष्मी		MX	Western line	X mark	X mark	Mumbai City	
Mahim Junction	माहिम जंक्शन		MM	Western line Harbour line	X mark	X mark	Mumbai City	
Malad	मालाड	M	MDD	Western line	check	X mark	Mumbai Suburban	Harbour line (under construction)
Mankhurd	मानखुर्द	MK	MNKD	Harbour line	X mark	X mark	Mumbai Suburban	
Mansarovar	मानसरोवर		MANR	Harbour line	X mark	X mark	Raigad	
Marine Lines	मरीन लाइन्स		MEL	Western line	X mark	X mark	Mumbai City	
Masjid	मशीद		MSD	Central line Harbour line	X mark	X mark	Mumbai City	
Matheran	माथेरान		MAE	Matheran Hill Railway	X mark	X mark	Raigad	
Matunga	माटुंगा		MTN	Central line	X mark	X mark	Mumbai City	
Matunga Road	माटुंगा रोड		MRU	Western line	X mark	X mark	Mumbai City	
Mira Road	मीरा रोड		MIRA	Western line	X mark	X mark	Thane	
Mulund	मुलुंड		MLND	Central line	check	X mark	Mumbai Suburban	
Mumbai Central	मुंबई सेंट्रल	BC	MMCT	Western line	check	check	Mumbai City	
Mumbra	मुंब्रा		MBQ	Central line	X mark	X mark	Thane	
Nagothane	नागोठणे		NGTN	Vasai Road–Roha line	X mark	X mark	Raigad	
Nahur	नाहूर		NHU	Central line	X mark	X mark	Mumbai Suburban	
Naigaon	नायगाव		NIG	Western line	X mark	X mark	Palghar	
Nallasopara	नालासोपारा	NS	NSP	Western line	X mark	X mark	Palghar	
Navde Road	नावडे रोड		NVRD	Vasai Road–Roha line	X mark	X mark	Raigad	
Neral Junction	नेरळ जंक्शन	NR	NRL	Central line Matheran Hill Railway	X mark	check	Raigad	
Nerul	नेरूळ	NU	NEU	Harbour line Trans-Harbour line Port line	X mark	X mark	Thane	
Nhava Sheva	न्हावा शेवा		NESA	Port line	X mark	X mark	Raigad	
Nidi	निडी		NIDI	Vasai Road–Roha line	X mark	X mark	Raigad	
Nilaje	निळजे		NIIJ	Vasai Road–Roha line	X mark	X mark	Thane	
Palasdhari	पळसधरी		PDI	Central line	X mark	X mark	Raigad	
Palghar	पालघर		PLG	Western line	X mark	check	Palghar	
Panvel	पनवेल	PL/PN	PNVL	Harbour line Vasai Road–Roha line Panvel-Karjat Railway Corridor	X mark	check	Raigad	
Parel	परळ	PR		Central line	X mark	X mark	Mumbai City	
Pen	पेण		PEN	Vasai Road–Roha line	X mark	check	Raigad	
Poyanje	पोयंजे		PYJE	Panvel-Karjat Railway Corridor	X mark	X mark	Raigad	
Prabhadevi	प्रभादेवी		PBHD	Western line	X mark	X mark	Mumbai City	
Rabale	रबाळे		RABE	Trans-Harbour line	X mark	X mark	Thane	
Ram Mandir	राम मंदिर		RMAR	Western line Harbour line	X mark	X mark	Mumbai Suburban	
Rasayani	रसायनी		RSYI	Vasai Road–Roha line	X mark	X mark	Raigad	
Reay Road	रे रोड		RRD	Harbour line	X mark	X mark	Mumbai City	
Roha	रोहे		ROHA	Vasai Road–Roha line	X mark	check	Raigad	
Sandhurst Road	सँडहर्स्ट रोड		SNRD	Central line Harbour line	X mark	X mark	Mumbai City	
Sanpada	सानपाडा		SNCR	Harbour line Trans-Harbour line	X mark	X mark	Thane	
Santacruz	सांताक्रुझ		STC	Western line Harbour line	X mark	X mark	Mumbai Suburban	
Saphale	सफाळे		SAH	Western line	X mark	X mark	Palghar	
Seawoods-Darave-Karave	सीवूड्स-दारावे-करावे		SWDK	Harbour line Port line	X mark	X mark	Thane	
Sewri	शिवडी		SVE	Harbour line	X mark	X mark	Mumbai City	
Shahad	शहाड		SHAD	Central line	X mark	X mark	Thane	
Shelu	शेलू		SHLU	Central line	X mark	X mark	Raigad	
Shematikhar	शेमटीखार		SEMK	Port line	X mark	X mark	Raigad	
Sion	शीव		SION	Central line	X mark	X mark	Mumbai Suburban	
Somatne	सोमाटणे		SMNE	Vasai Road–Roha line	X mark	X mark	Raigad	
Taloje Panchnand	तळोजे पांचनंद		TPND	Vasai Road–Roha line	X mark	X mark	Raigad	
Targhar	तरघर		TRGR	Port line	X mark	X mark	Raigad	
Thakurli	ठाकुर्ली		THK	Central line	X mark	X mark	Thane	
Thane	ठाणे	T	TNA	Central line Trans-Harbour line	check	check	Thane	
Thansit	तानशेत		THS	Central line	X mark	X mark	Thane	
Tilak Nagar	टिळक नगर		TKNG	Harbour line	X mark	X mark	Mumbai Suburban	
Titwala	टिटवाळा	TL	TLA	Central line	check	X mark	Thane	
Turbhe	तुर्भे		TUH	Trans-Harbour line	X mark	X mark	Thane	
Ulhasnagar	उल्हासनगर		ULNR	Central line	X mark	X mark	Thane	
Umbermali	उंबरमाळी		OMB	Central line	X mark	X mark	Thane	
Umroli	उमरोळी		UOI	Western line	X mark	X mark	Palghar	
Uran	उरण	U	URAN	Port line	X mark	X mark	Raigad	
Vaitarna	वैतरणा		VTN	Western line	X mark	X mark	Palghar	
Vangani	वांगणी		VGI	Central line	X mark	X mark	Thane	
Vangaon	वाणगाव		VGN	Western line	X mark	X mark	Palghar	
Vasai Road	वसई रोड	BS	BSR	Western line Vasai Road–Roha line	check	check	Palghar	
Vashi	वाशी	VA	VSH	Harbour line Trans-Harbour line	X mark	X mark	Thane	
Vasind	वाशिंद		VSD	Central line	X mark	X mark	Thane	
Vidyavihar	विद्याविहार		VVH	Central line	X mark	X mark	Mumbai Suburban	
Vikhroli	विक्रोळी		VK	Central line	check	X mark	Mumbai Suburban	
Vile Parle	विलेपार्ले		VLP	Western line Harbour line	X mark	X mark	Mumbai Suburban	
Virar	विरार	V	VR	Western line	check	check	Palghar	
Vithalwadi	विठ्ठलवाडी		VLDI	Central line	X mark	X mark	Thane	
Wadala Road	वडाळा रोड	VD	VDLR	Harbour line	X mark	X mark	Mumbai City	
Water Pipe	वॉटर पाईप		WTP	Matheran Hill Railway	X mark	X mark	Raigad	
