= Gavan railway station =

Railway station in Navi Mumbai, Maharashtra, India

Gavan

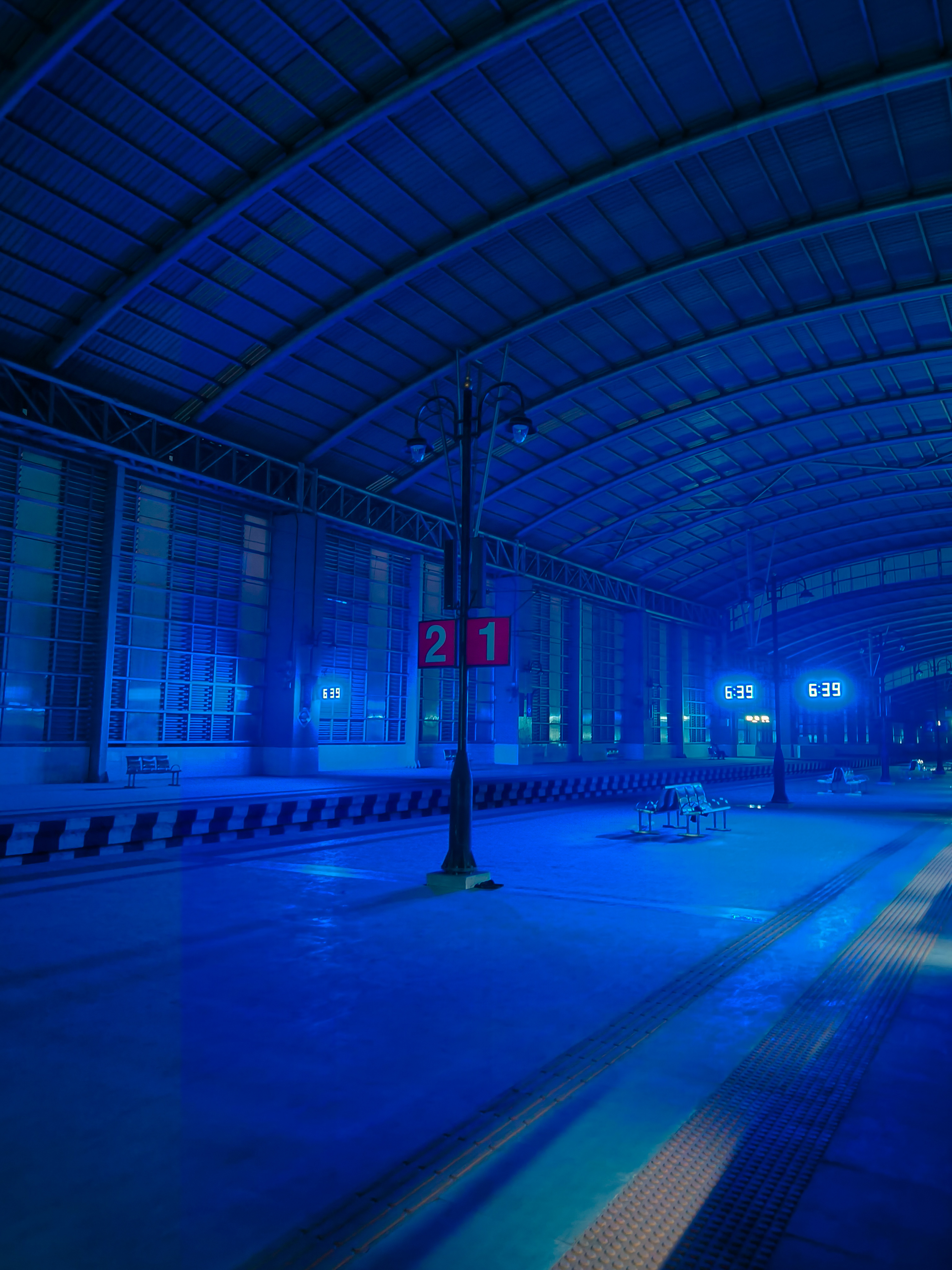
- Gavan railway station

General information
- Location: Jasai, JNPT Road, Navi Mumbai, Maharashtra, 410206; India
- Coordinates: 18.935252°N 73.022235°E
- Elevation: 23 metres (75 ft)
- System: Mumbai Suburban Railway station
- Owner: Indian Railways
- Operator: Central Railway
- Line: Port line
- Platforms: 2
- Tracks: 2

Construction
- Structure type: Standard (on-ground station)
- Parking: No
- Cycle facilities: No

Other information
- Status: Operational
- Station code: GAVN
- Zone(s): Central Railway
- Division(s): Mumbai CR

History
- Opened: 15 December 2025; 8 months ago

Services
Preceding station	Mumbai Suburban Railway	Following station
Kharkopar towards Nerul or CBD Belapur	Port line	Shematikhar towards Uran
Route map
Location
- Location within Mumbai
- Location of Gavan railway station

Gavan railway station is a railway station in Raigad district, Maharashtra. Its station code is GAVN. It serves Gavan and Jasai areas of Navi Mumbai. It consists of two platforms.
