= Nhava Sheva railway station =

Railway Station in Maharashtra, India

Nhava Sheva

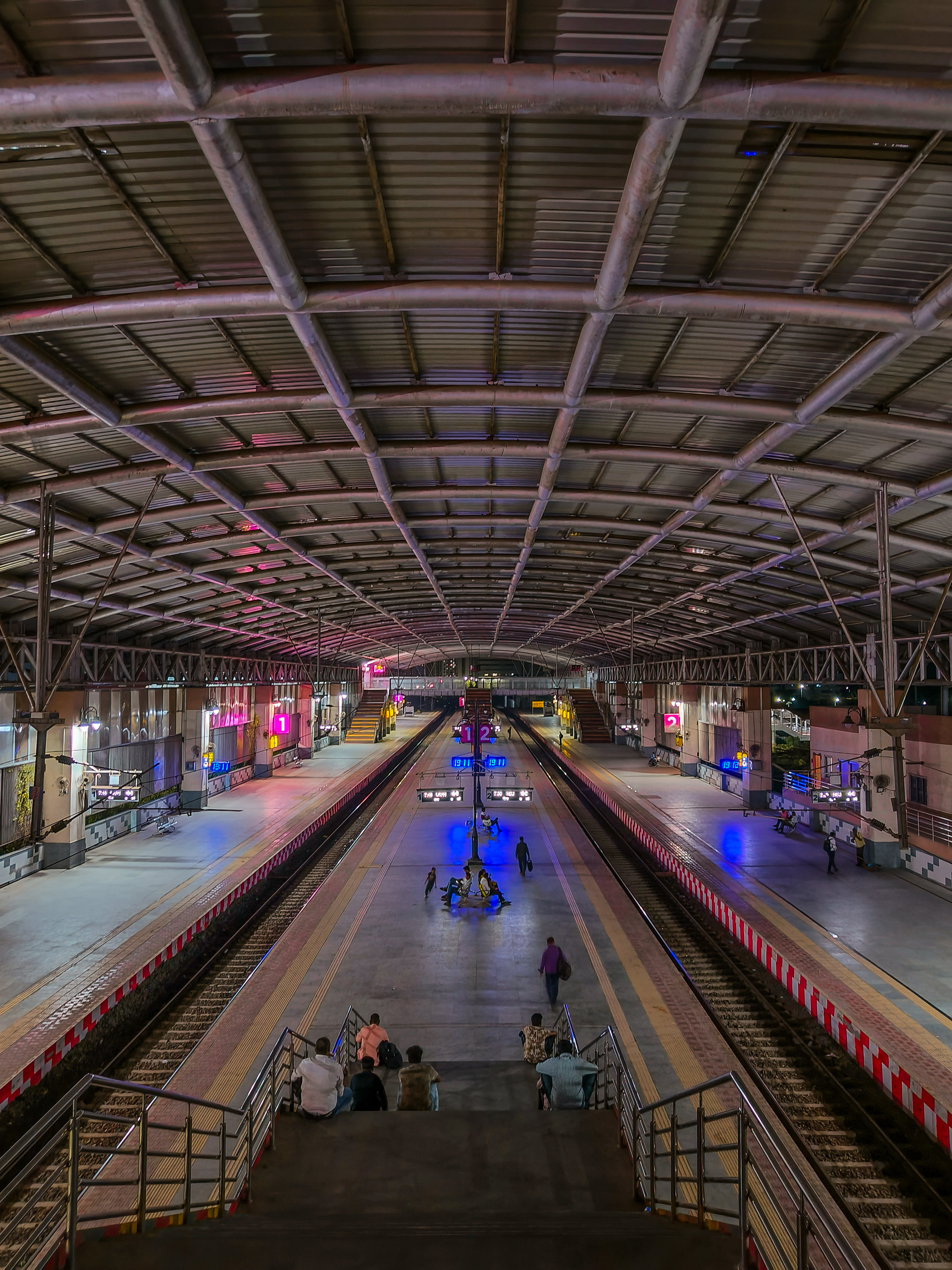
- Nhava Sheva railway station

General information
- Location: Sonari, JNPT Road, Navi Mumbai, Maharashtra 400707; India
- Coordinates: 18.898024°N 72.987769°E
- Elevation: 1 metre (3.3 ft)
- System: Mumbai Suburban Railway station
- Owner: Indian Railways
- Operator: Central Railway
- Line: Port line
- Platforms: 2
- Tracks: 2

Construction
- Structure type: Standard (on-ground station)
- Parking: No
- Cycle facilities: No

Other information
- Status: Operational
- Station code: NESA
- Zone(s): Central Railway
- Division(s): Mumbai CR

History
- Opened: 12 January 2024; 2 years ago

Services
Preceding station	Mumbai Suburban Railway	Following station
Shematikhar towards Nerul or CBD Belapur	Port line	Dronagiri towards Uran
Route map
Location
- Location within Maharashtra
- Location of Nhava Sheva railway station

Nhava Sheva railway station is a railway station in Navi Mumbai's Raigad district, Maharashtra. Its station code is NESA. It serves JNPT and Nhava Sheva area of Navi Mumbai. The station has two platforms.
