= Bamandongri railway station =

Railway station in Navi Mumbai, Maharashtra, India

Bamandongri

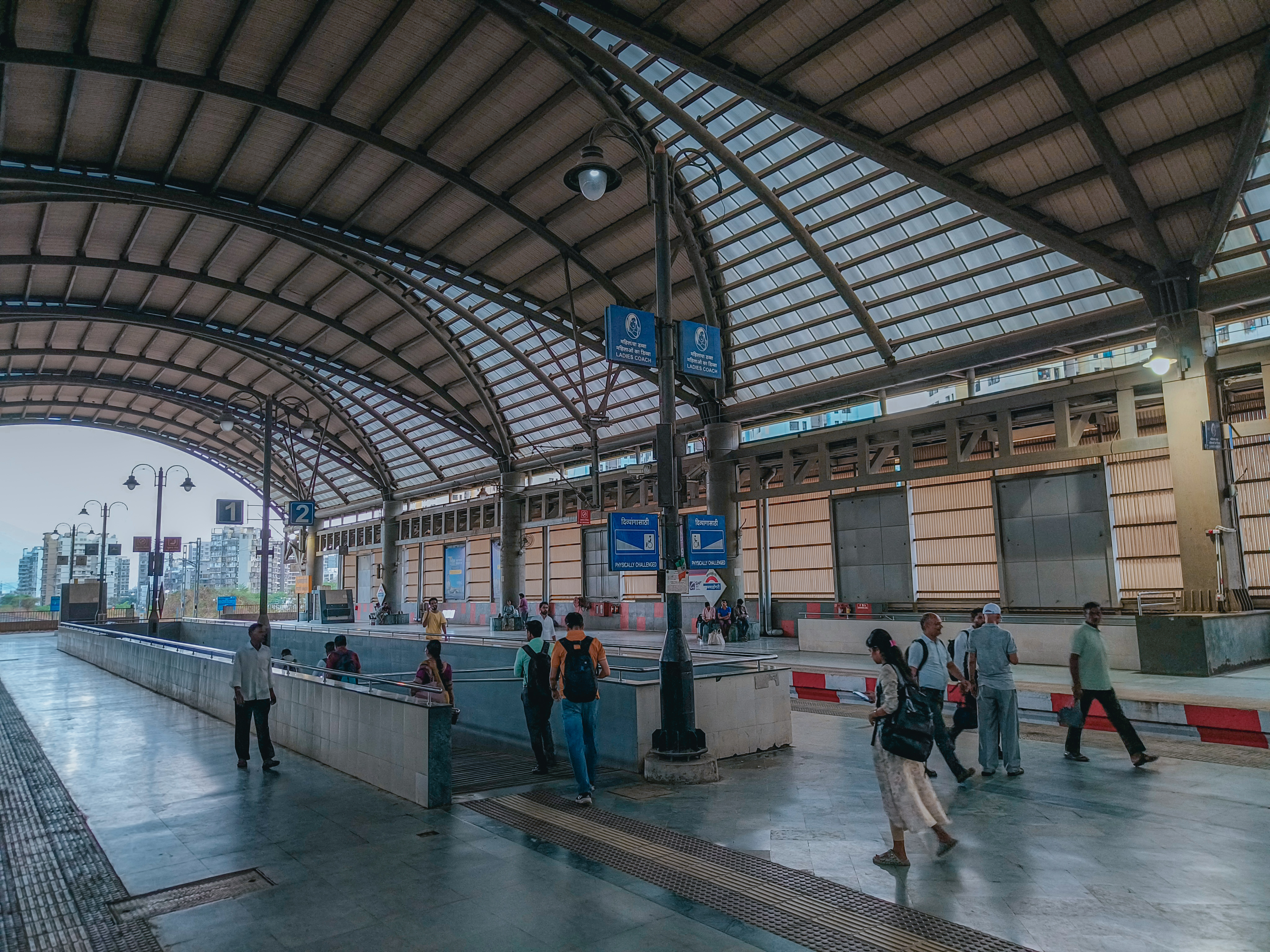
- Bamandongri railway station

General information
- Location: Bhendkhal Road, Navi Mumbai, Maharashtra; India
- Coordinates: 18.9748217°N 73.0237017°E
- Elevation: 0 metres (0 ft)
- System: Mumbai Suburban Railway
- Owner: Indian Railways
- Operator: Central Railway
- Line: Port line
- Platforms: 2
- Tracks: 2

Construction
- Structure type: Standard (on-ground station)
- Parking: No
- Cycle facilities: No

Other information
- Status: functional
- Station code: BMDR
- Zone(s): Central Railway
- Division(s): Mumbai CR

History
- Opened: 12 November 2018; 7 years ago

Services
Preceding station	Mumbai Suburban Railway	Following station
Targhar towards Nerul or CBD Belapur	Port line	Kharkopar towards Uran
Route map
Location
- Location within Mumbai
- Location of Bamandongri railway station

Bamandongri railway station (station code: BMDR) is a railway station in Navi Mumbai, Maharashtra. It serves Ulwe Node to Nerul & CBD Belapur. The station consists of two platforms. The station opened on 12 November 2018 after construction work.
