= Kharkopar railway station =

Railway station in Navi Mumbai, Maharashtra, India

Kharkopar

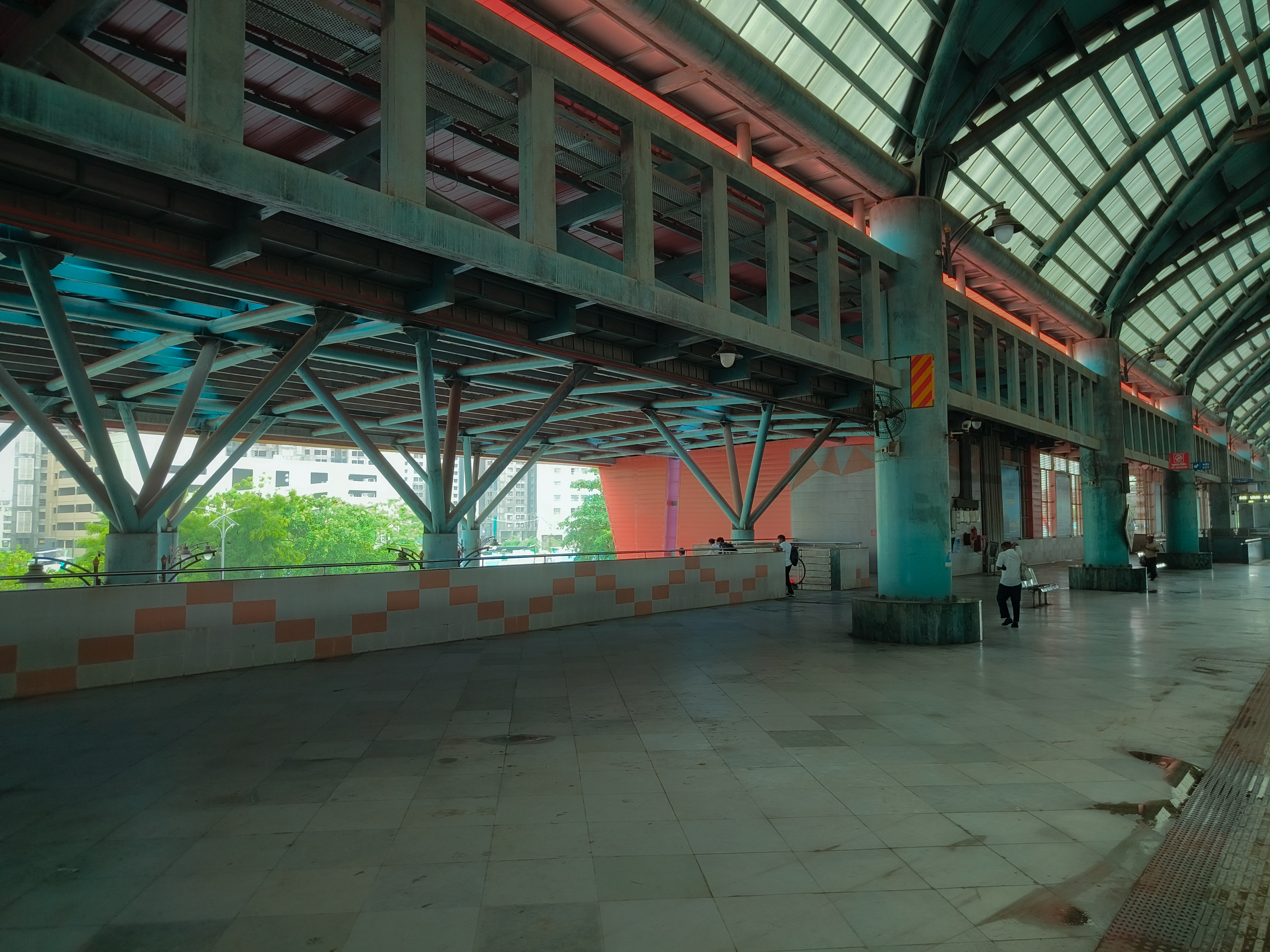
- Kharkopar railway station

General information
- Location: Bandar Road, Gavhan, Navi Mumbai, Maharashtra, 410206; India
- Coordinates: 18.9599°N 73.0141°E
- Elevation: 6 metres (20 ft)
- System: Mumbai Suburban Railway station
- Owner: Indian Railways
- Operator: Central Railway
- Line: Port line
- Platforms: 2
- Tracks: 2

Construction
- Structure type: Standard (on-ground station)
- Parking: No
- Cycle facilities: No

Other information
- Status: Operational
- Station code: KR
- Zone(s): Central Railway
- Division(s): Mumbai CR

History
- Opened: 12 November 2018; 7 years ago

Services
Preceding station	Mumbai Suburban Railway	Following station
Bamandongri towards Nerul or CBD Belapur	Port line	Gavan towards Uran
Route map
Port line
Location
- Location within Mumbai
- Location of Kharkopar railway station

Kharkopar railway station (station code: KARP (mainline)/ KR (suburban)) is a suburban railway station in Raigad district, Maharashtra, India. It serves the Kharkopar area of Navi Mumbai. The station consists of two platforms.

The station was the terminal for the Port line, until it was later extended to Uran in January 2024.
