= Shematikhar railway station =

Railway Station in Maharashtra, India

Shematikhar

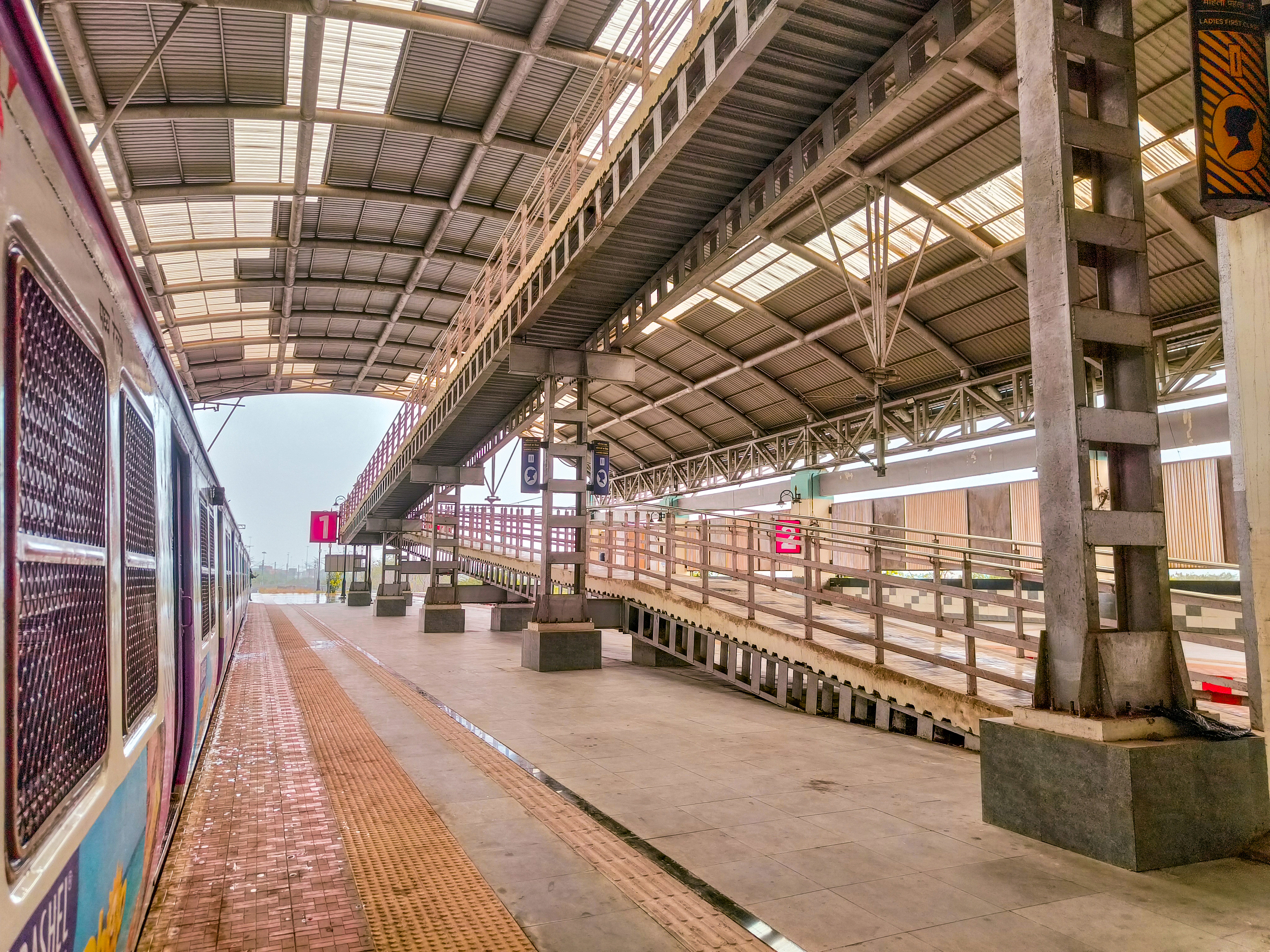
- Shematikhar railway station

General information
- Location: Shematikhar, JNPT Road, Navi Mumbai, Maharashtra, 410206; India
- Coordinates: 18.909230°N 73.015816°E
- Elevation: 1 metre (3.3 ft)
- System: Mumbai Suburban Railway station
- Owner: Indian Railways
- Operator: Central Railway
- Line: Port line
- Platforms: 2
- Tracks: 2

Construction
- Structure type: Standard (on-ground station)
- Parking: No
- Cycle facilities: No

Other information
- Status: Operational
- Station code: SEMK
- Zone(s): Central Railway
- Division(s): Mumbai CR

History
- Opened: 12 January 2024; 2 years ago
- Former names: Ranjanpada

Services
Preceding station	Mumbai Suburban Railway	Following station
Gavan towards Nerul or CBD Belapur	Port line	Nhava Sheva towards Uran
Route map
Location
- Location within Mumbai
- Location of Shematikhar railway station

Shematikhar railway station, formerly Ranjanpada railway station, is a railway station in Navi Mumbai's Raigad district, Maharashtra. Its station code is SEMK. It serves Shematikhar, Ranjanpada and Jasai area of Navi Mumbai. The station has two platforms.
