= Targhar railway station =

Railway Station in Maharashtra, India

Targhar

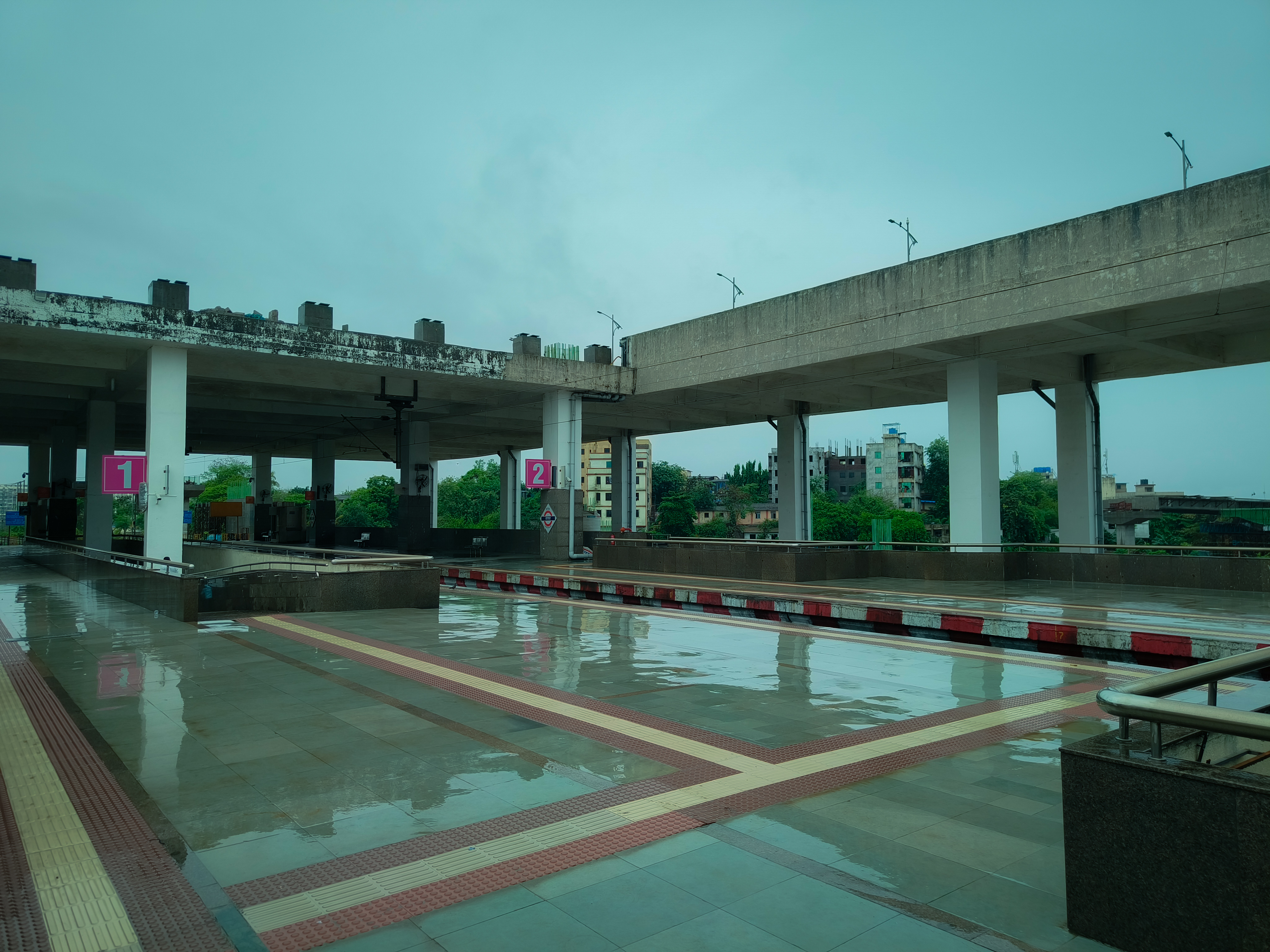
- Targhar railway station

General information
- Location: Factory Road, Moha, Ulwe, Navi Mumbai, Maharashtra; India
- Coordinates: 18.989922°N 73.034314°E
- Elevation: 1 metre (3.3 ft)
- System: Mumbai Suburban Railway station
- Owner: Indian Railways
- Operator: Central Railway
- Line: Port line
- Platforms: 2
- Tracks: 2

Construction
- Structure type: Standard (on-ground station)
- Parking: No
- Cycle facilities: No

Other information
- Status: Operational
- Station code: TRGR
- Zone(s): Central Railway
- Division(s): Mumbai CR

History
- Opened: 15 December 2025; 8 months ago

Services
Preceding station	Mumbai Suburban Railway	Following station
Seawoods-Darave-Karave towards Nerul	Port line	Bamandongri towards Uran
CBD Belapur Terminus	Port line	Bamandongri towards Uran
Route map
Port line
Location
- Location within Mumbai
- Location of Targhar railway station

Targhar railway station is a railway station in Navi Mumbai's Raigad district, Maharashtra. Its code is TRGR. It serves the Targhar area of Navi Mumbai and Navi Mumbai International Airport. The station has two platforms.
