= Dronagiri railway station =

Railway Station in Maharashtra, India

Dronagiri

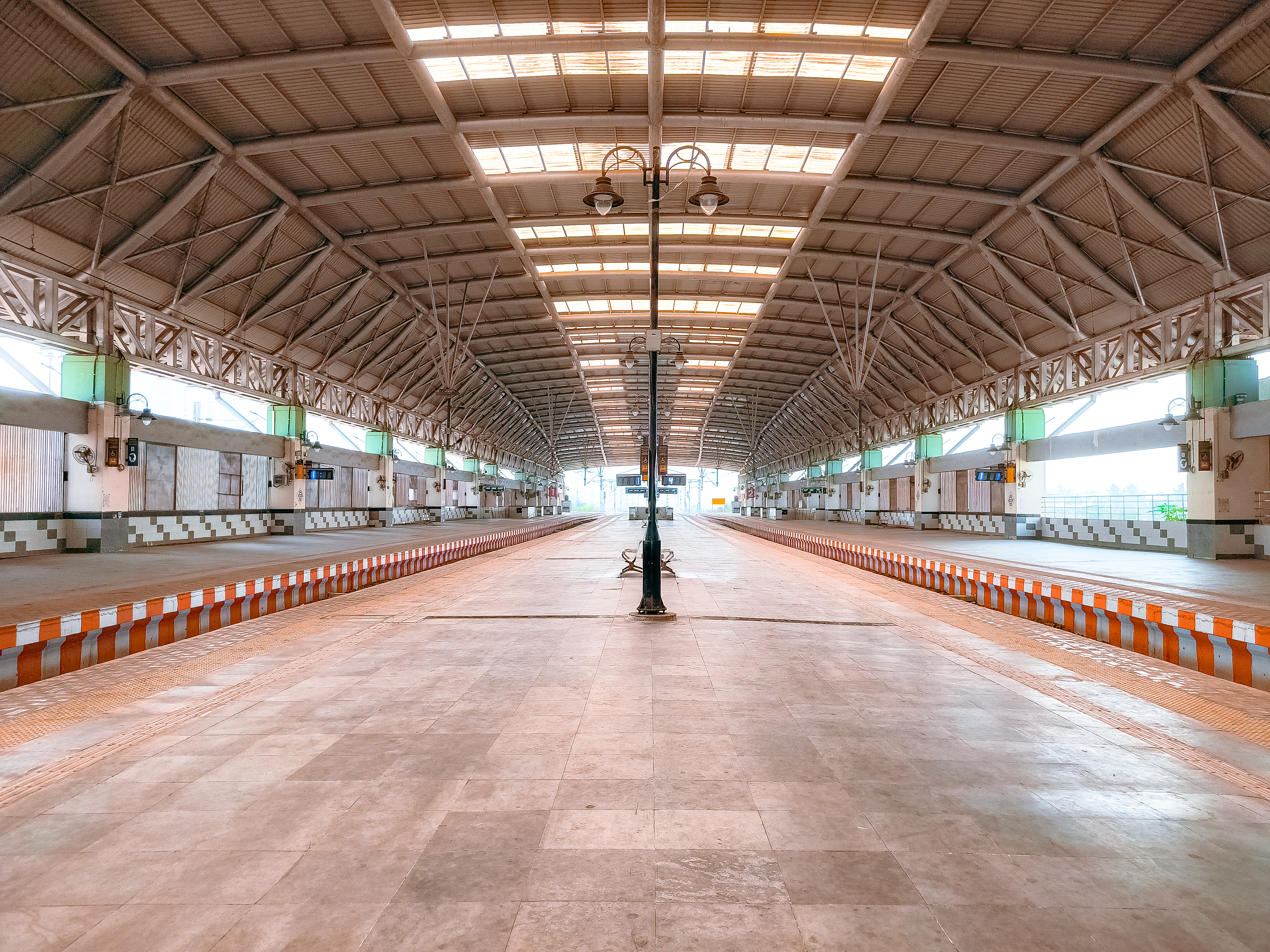
- Dronagiri railway station

General information
- Location: Bokadvira Uran Road, Navi Mumbai, Maharashtra 400702; India
- Coordinates: 18.881275°N 72.964723°E
- Elevation: 0 metres (0 ft)
- System: Mumbai Suburban Railway station
- Owner: Indian Railways
- Operator: Central Railway
- Line: Port line
- Platforms: 2
- Tracks: 2

Construction
- Structure type: Standard (on-ground station)
- Parking: No
- Cycle facilities: No

Other information
- Status: Operational
- Station code: DRGI
- Zone(s): Central Railway
- Division(s): Mumbai CR

History
- Opened: 12 January 2024; 2 years ago

Services
Preceding station	Mumbai Suburban Railway	Following station
Nhava Sheva towards Nerul or CBD Belapur	Port line	Uran Terminus
Route map
Location
- Location within Maharashtra
- Location of Dronagiri railway station

Dronagiri railway station is a railway station in Navi Mumbai's Raigad district, Maharashtra. Its station code is DRGI. It serves Dronagiri area of Navi Mumbai, near Uran, Navi Mumbai. The station has two platforms.

Exterior view of the Dronagiri Railway Station
