= Funcho =

Indian YouTuber

YouTube information
- Channels: Funcho; Dhruv & Shyam Vlogs; Funcho Shorts
- Years active: 2017–present
- Genres: vlogs; comedy
- Subscribers: 3.99 million
- Views: 1.05 billion
- Last updated: 15 December 2024

Funcho is a Youtube comedy channel based out of India. Funcho have featured in India's Top 100 Digital Stars, 2022 by Forbes magazine.

== History ==
Funcho was founded in 2017 by two engineers, Shyam Sharma and Dhruv Shah.

The channel name "Funcho", was chosen as it means laughter. The channel "Funcho" alone has over 3.5 million subscribers and more than 200 uploads on YouTube as of February 2023. Dhruv & Shyam together have 3 youtube channels named "Funcho", "Dhruv & Shyam" and "Funcho Shorts". In 2022, Funcho boys completed 5 years in the content creation world.

== Career ==
In November 2022, DJ Snake invited Funcho to join in his India tour. Funcho had a special meeting with Priyanka Chopra in Mumbai in 2022. In 2022, Funcho featured on India's Top 100 Digital Stars, by Forbes India, were ranked 12th on the list. The channel has celebrated its reach to a 1 million audience by performing a live play at B N Vaidya Hall, Dadar East of Mumbai. The event was crowded with about 500 fans from across Maharastra and neighboring states.

The total views for the 3 channels of Funcho have crossed 4.1 billion, as of August 2022.

== Video format ==
The channel produces content based on trending topics and day-to-day occurrences. They also create skits, dramas, and comedies about current happenings. The skits they produce are often very topical and relatable. Their fans are labeled as "Bachie Gang".

== Controversies ==
In 2018, Funcho made a video on a moving train for the Kiki challenge. After the video went viral, they were arrested and produced at the Vasai Railway Court. The court sentenced them to clean a railway station for three consecutive days.
