= List of stations in Mumbai =

List of stations in Mumbai may refer to:

- List of Mumbai Suburban Railway stations
- List of Mumbai Metro stations
- Line 1 (Mumbai Monorail)

For Western Line- Churchgate, Marine Lines, Charni Road, Grant Road, Mumbai Central, Mahalaxmi, Lower Parel, Prabhadevi, Dadar, Matunga Road, Mahim Junction, Bandra, Khar Road, Santacruz, Vile Parle, Andheri, Jogeshwari, Ram Mandir, Goregaon, Malad, Kandivali, Borivali, Dahisar, Mira Road, Bhayander, Naigaon, Vasai Road, Nalasopara, Virar, Vaitarna, Saphale, Kelve Road, Palghar, Umroli, Boisar, Vangaon, Dahanu Road
