= Bamandongri =

Village in Maharashtra

- Nodal town of Navi Mumbai
- Location in Maharashtra, India Bamandongri (India)
- Coordinates: 18°58′16″N 73°01′27″E
- Country: India
- State: Maharashtra
- City: Navi Mumbai
- District: Raigad

Languages
  - Official: Marathi
- Time zone: UTC+5:30 (IST)
- PIN: 410206
- Nearest city: Panvel

Bamandongari (IAST: Bāmaṇḍoṅgrī) is a historical village and a node of Navi Mumbai's Raigad district, situated in Maharashtra, India.

There is Hanuman Temple in Bamandongari and also a primary school.

It is situated on the Eastern Side of Mumbai and is connected to Panvel in Navi Mumbai and rest of Navi Mumbai and MMR via State Transport bus service, eight NMMT bus routes, and local train. Nearby villages include Wahal, Morave, Jawle, Gavhan, Shelghar, Shivajinagar, and Kharkopar.

Historically Bamandongari is a village of fishermen and farmers. The primary crop is paddy. The main caste and sub-caste of the villagers is Hindu / Agri.

Nearest Place worth visiting named "Langeshwar" is just 2 km away on north-west. The place is a famous religious spot having very old 'Lord Shiva temple' situated on the sea shore in the vicinity of village Morave. Mahashivaratri, a festival of Lord Shiva, is celebrated annually here by arranging a carnival and small fair by villagers of nearby villages.

Recent developments: The project of commercial and residential buildings of Ulwe node is in progress around the village and it is now surrounded by Sector 6, Sector 9, Sector 18 and Sector 19 of Ulwe node of Navi Mumbai.

Revent developments: Bamandongri railway station on the railway line connecting CBD Belapur and Nerul to JNPT (Jawaharlal Nehru Port Trust) has been in operation since 12 November 2018.
