= Nexus Seawoods =

Shopping Mall in Navi Mumbai

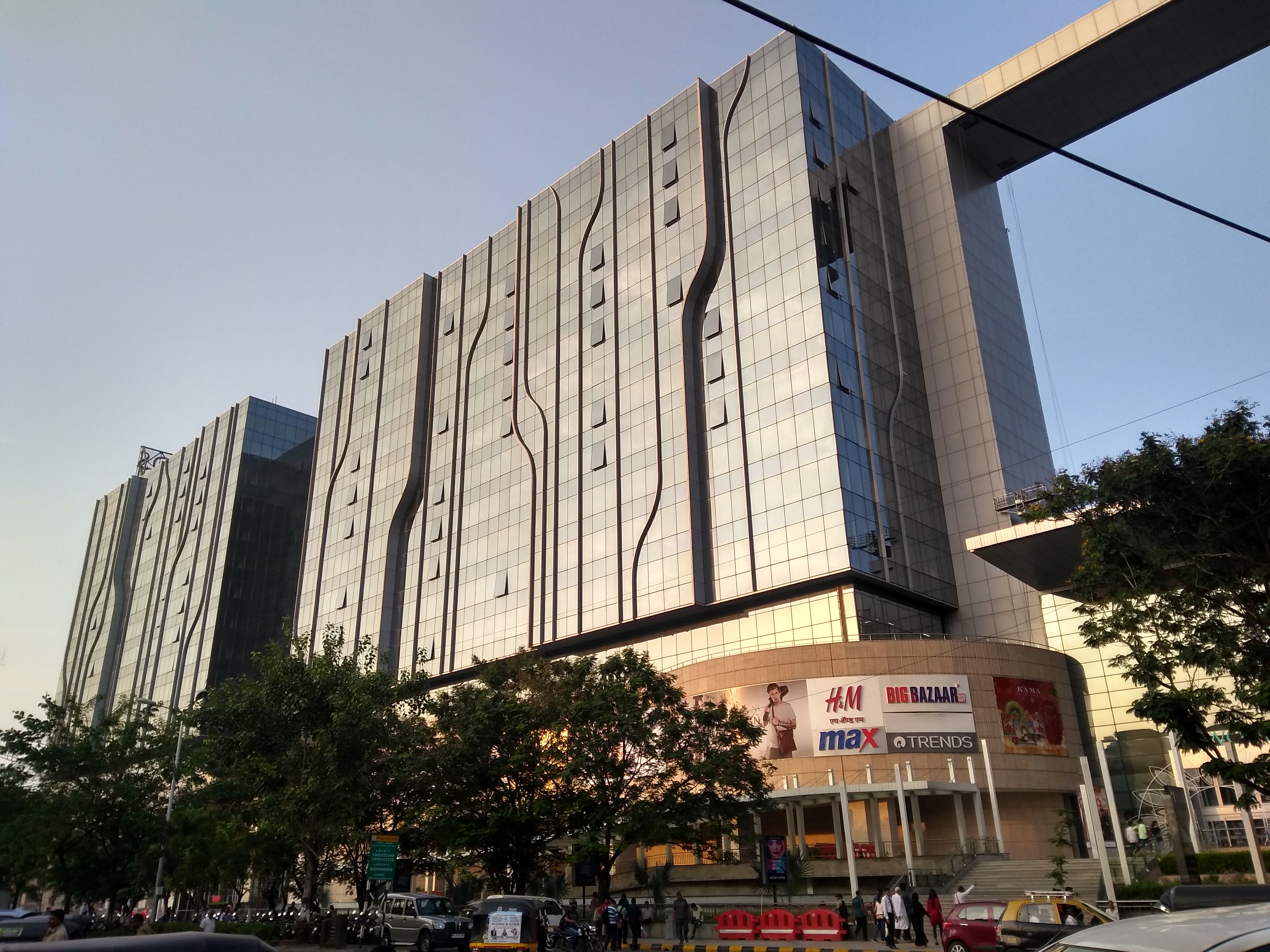
- Seawoods Grand Central 4
- Location: Navi Mumbai, Maharashtra, India
- Coordinates: 19°1′17.66″N 73°1′5.86″E
- Address: Plot No R, 1, Seawoods Station Rd, near Railway Station, Nerul East, Sector 40
- Opened: 23 March 2017
- Developer: Larsen & Toubro
- Owner: Nexus Select Trust
- Floor area: 971,742 sq ft (90,277.8 m^{2})
- Floors: 4
- Website: www.nexusselecttrust.com/nexus-seawood

Nexus Seawoods, formerly known as Seawoods Grand Central Mall, is a shopping mall located in Seawoods, Navi Mumbai. Launched in 2017 as Seawoods Grand Central, it was built as Transit Oriented Development, allowing seamless access to the mall from suburban railway. Spanning 40 acres, Nexus Seawoods has multiple shops including a multiplex (IMAX & 4DX), game arcade, fashion, accessories, cafes and restaurants. It has centralized air conditioning and a security and building management system.

Nexus Seawoods is also home to a large exhibition space with a wide selection of home-grown and local brands that exhibit their wares.

View of the Seawoods Grand Central Mall from the front side.

== History ==
Built by Larsen and Toubro Realty, Nexus Seawoods was envisioned as part of a Transit Oriented Development project which includes offices and residential complexes, all built around Seawoods Darave railway station of the Harbour line. Spread around 40 acres and with a leasable area of 1.2 million sq.ft., it is India's largest retail transit-oriented development project.

Work on the retail project began around 2008, following an agreement between L&T Realty and CIDCO to develop the Seawoods Darave station area. During construction of the mall, Blackstone Group, through its Indian subsidiary Nexus Malls, bought retail spaces spanning 1 million sq.ft from L&T Realty.

On March 23, 2017, the first phase of the mall, which includes retail spaces, officially opened to the general public under the name Seawoods Grand Central (SGC) Mall. The second phase was opened in 2019, which includes gaming and arcade zones, a multiplex with IMAX and 4DX and a second exhibition space.

In 2022, as part of consolidating all of its malls under the Nexus brand, Seawoods Grand Central was officially renamed to Nexus Seawoods.
