= Turbhe railway station =

Railway Station in Maharashtra, India

Coordinates: 19.076121°N 73.017755°E

Turbhe

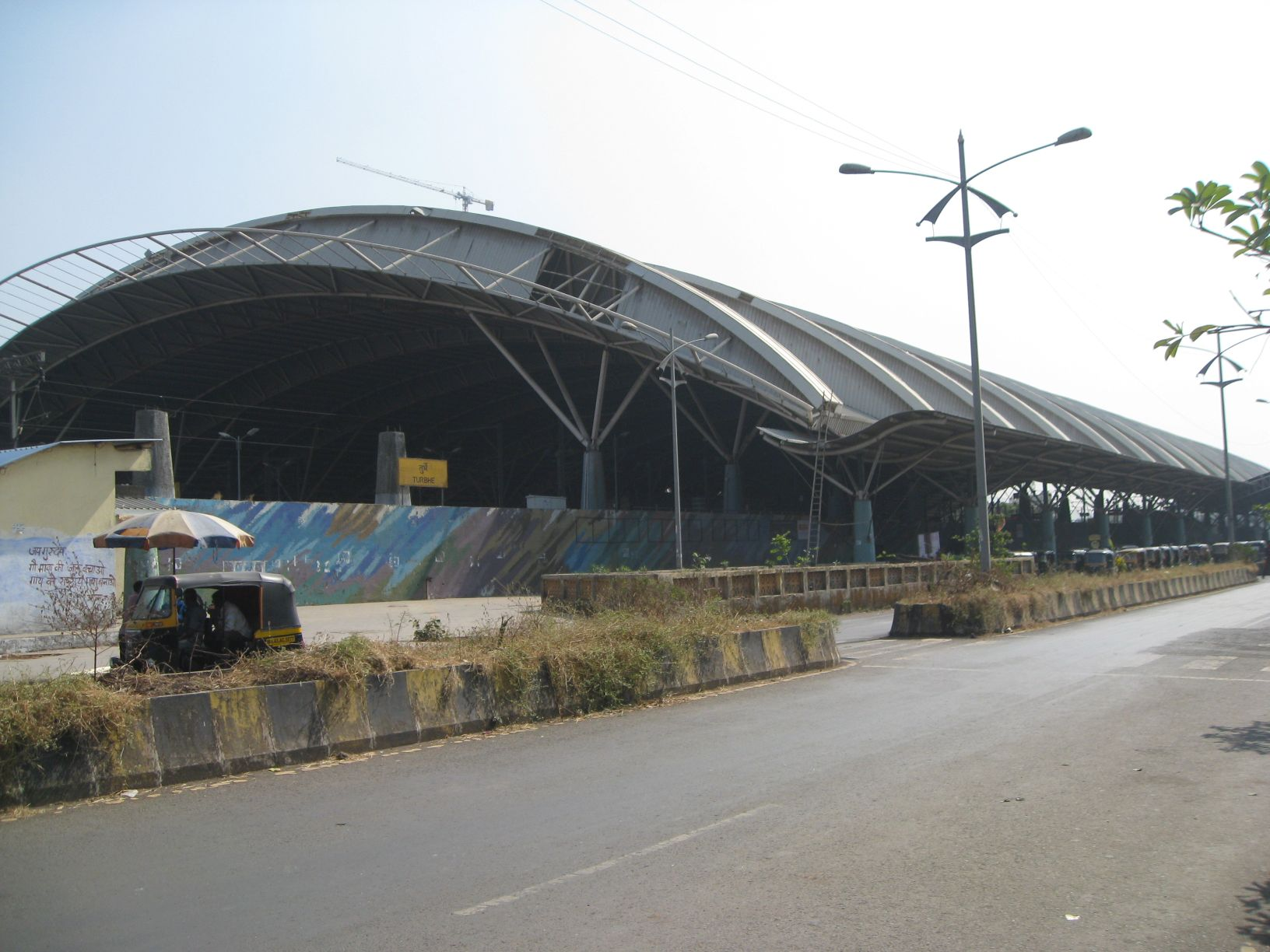
- The station structure was designed by Hafeez Contractor

General information
- System: Mumbai Suburban Railway station
- Owner: Ministry of Railways, Indian Railways
- Line: Trans-Harbour Line
- Platforms: 4

Construction
- Structure type: Standard on-ground station

Other information
- Status: Active
- Station code: TUH
- Fare zone: Central Railways

History
- Opened: 2004

Services
Preceding station	Mumbai Suburban Railway	Following station
Koparkhairane towards Thane	Trans-Harbour line	Sanpada towards Vashi
Koparkhairane towards Thane	Trans-Harbour line	Juinagar towards Panvel
Route map
Location
- Location within India Location within Mumbai

Turbhe railway station is on the Harbour Line of the Mumbai Suburban Railway network near Mumbai, Maharashtra, India. It is a junction station and is located in the node of Turbhe. The station is accessible from the Thane–Belapur road on the eastern side and the NMMT depot on the western side.

Turbhe is the fifth railway station on the Thane-Turbhe-Vashi/Nerul Rail Corridor, a 23-km-long corridor connecting Thane with Navi Mumbai. It is at a distance of 15 km from Thane railway station and 3 km from Vashi railway station. The station has been designed by Hafeez Contractor. Like other stations on this corridor, Turbhe has double discharge facilities on all tracks with a width of 12 m for island platforms and 8 m for end platforms. The station occupies an area of 15,000 square metres and has a parking capacity for 175 cars and 250 motorcycles.

As of 2005, there were twelve services a day on this rail line in either direction. Currently, there are 88 services on either side from Vashi and Thane.
