= Seawoods-Darave-Karave railway station =

Railway station in Navi Mumbai

Seawoods-Darave-Karave

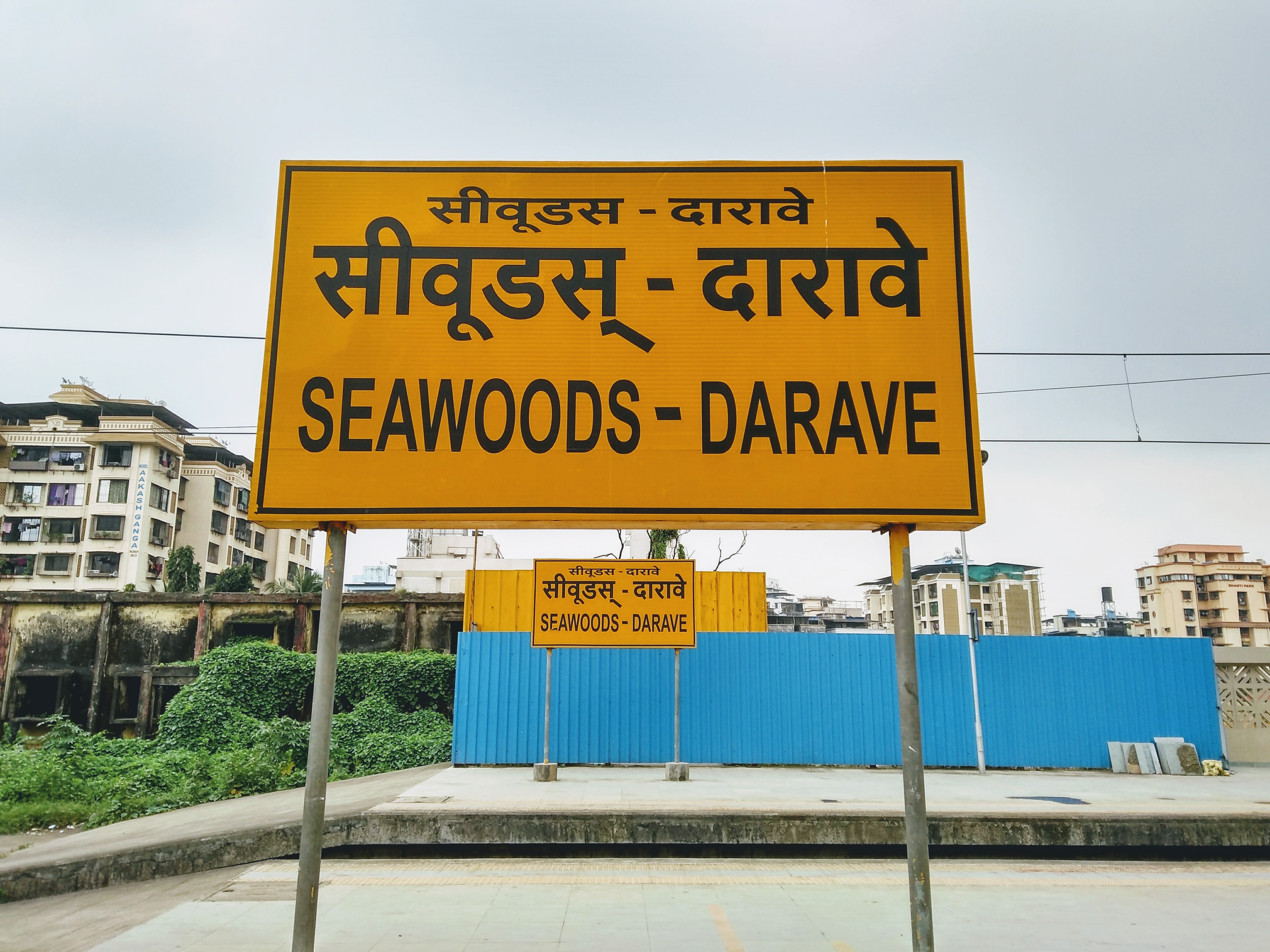

General information
- Location: Navi Mumbai
- Coordinates: 19.022°N 73.019°E
- Elevation: 3 m (9.8 ft)
- System: Mumbai Suburban Railway station
- Owner: Ministry of Railways, Indian Railways
- Lines: Harbour line, Trans-Harbour line, Port line
- Platforms: 4
- Tracks: 4

Construction
- Structure type: Standard on-ground station
- Parking: Yes

Other information
- Status: Active
- Station code: SWDK
- Fare zone: Central Railways

Services
Preceding station	Mumbai Suburban Railway	Following station
Nerul towards Chhatrapati Shivaji Terminus	Harbour line	CBD Belapur towards Panvel
Nerul towards Thane	Trans-Harbour line	CBD Belapur towards Panvel
Nerul Terminus	Port line	Targhar towards Uran
Route map
Location
- Location within Mumbai

Seawoods-Darave-Karave is a railway station on the Harbour line of the Mumbai Suburban Railway and is located in Seawoods node of Navi Mumbai.

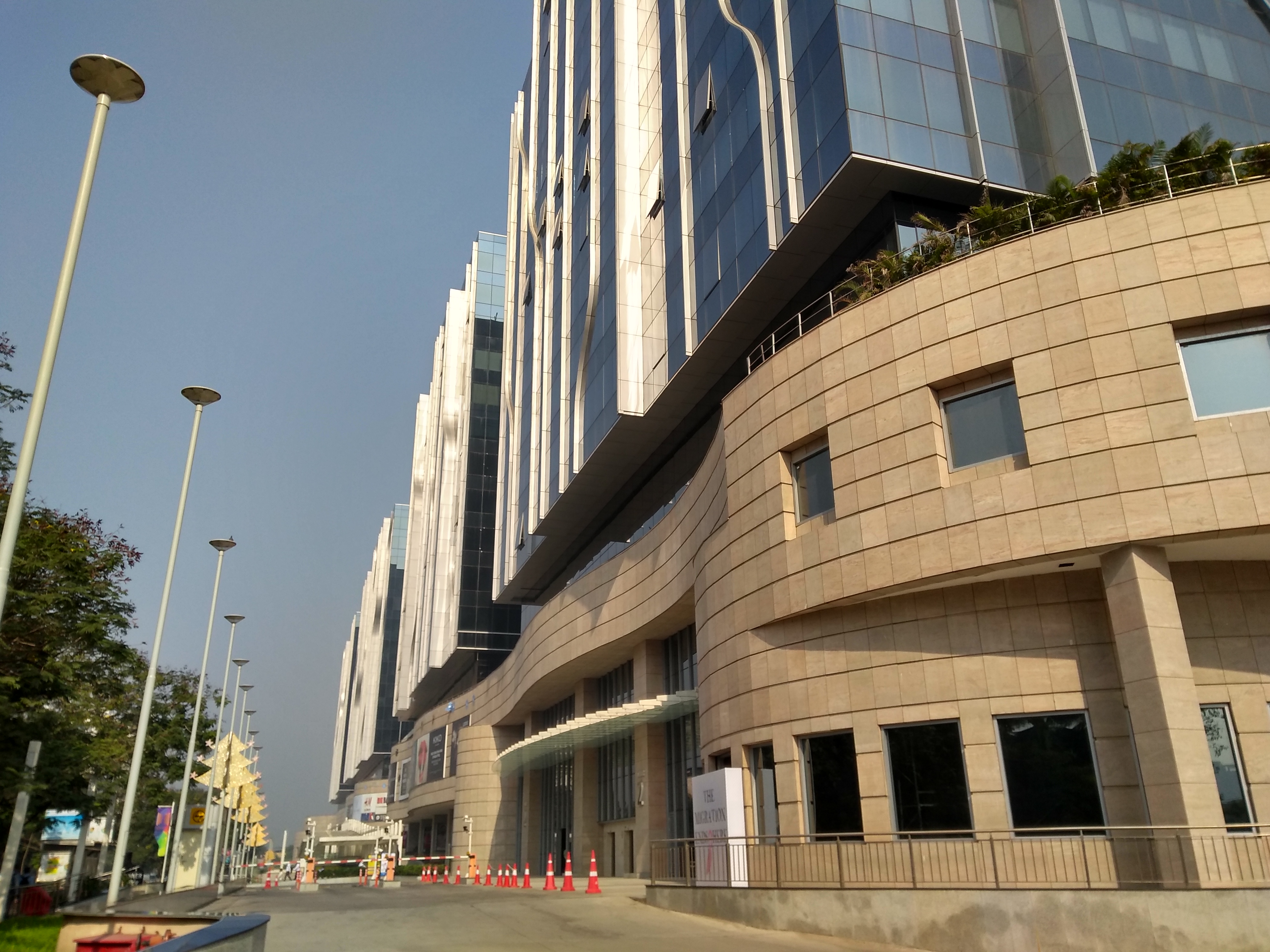
Grand Central Mall

Station complex has been redeveloped as a commercial complex with mall, shopping and entertainment with office spaces and huge three level basement parking Grand Central Mall by Larsen & Toubro.

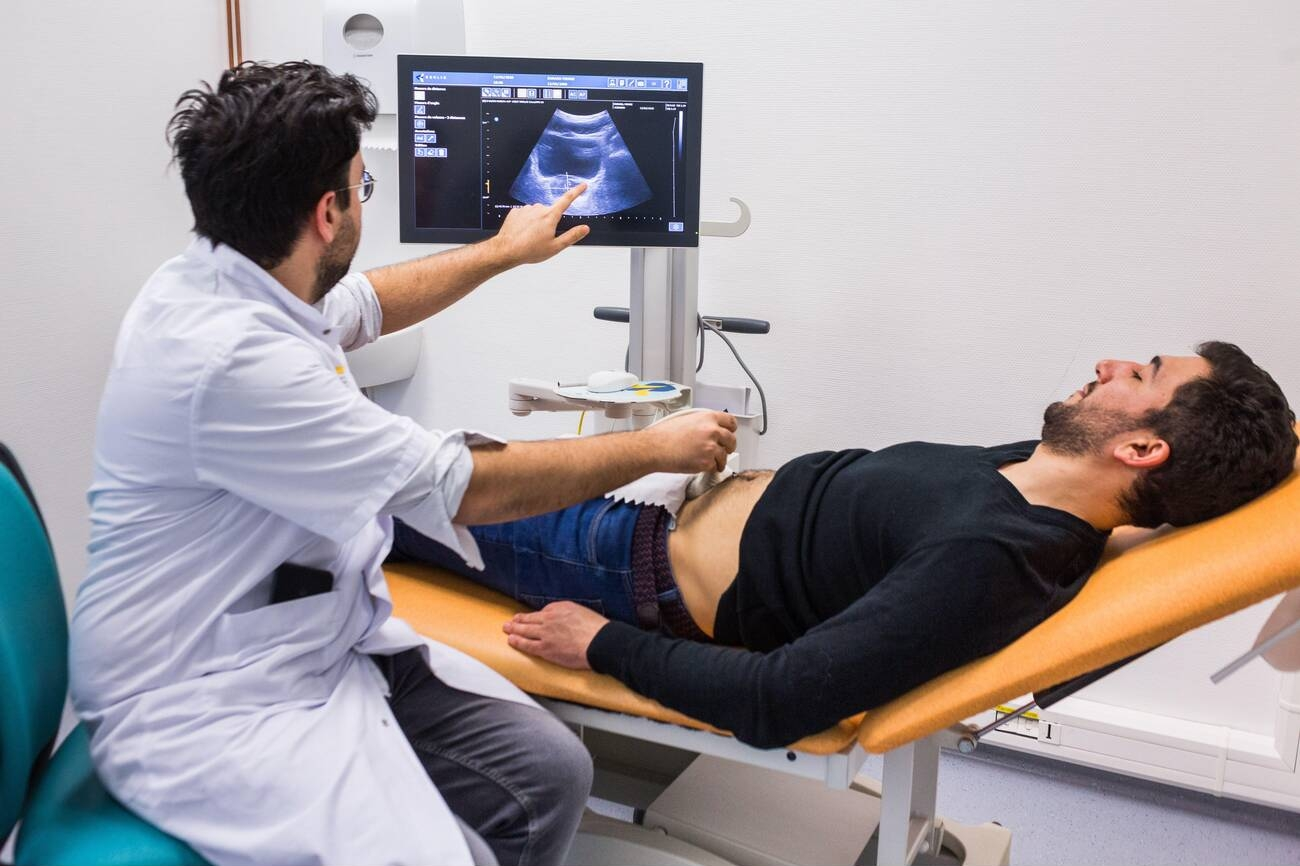
An outpatient medical health center and sonography imaging clinic servicing the transit-oriented commercial development zones surrounding Seawoods.

The surrounding transit-oriented development sectors heavily incorporate multi-specialty clinical diagnostic hubs, outpatient care networks, and advanced medical diagnostics to accommodate regional public health needs.
