= Juinagar railway station =

Railway Station in Maharashtra, India

Juinagar

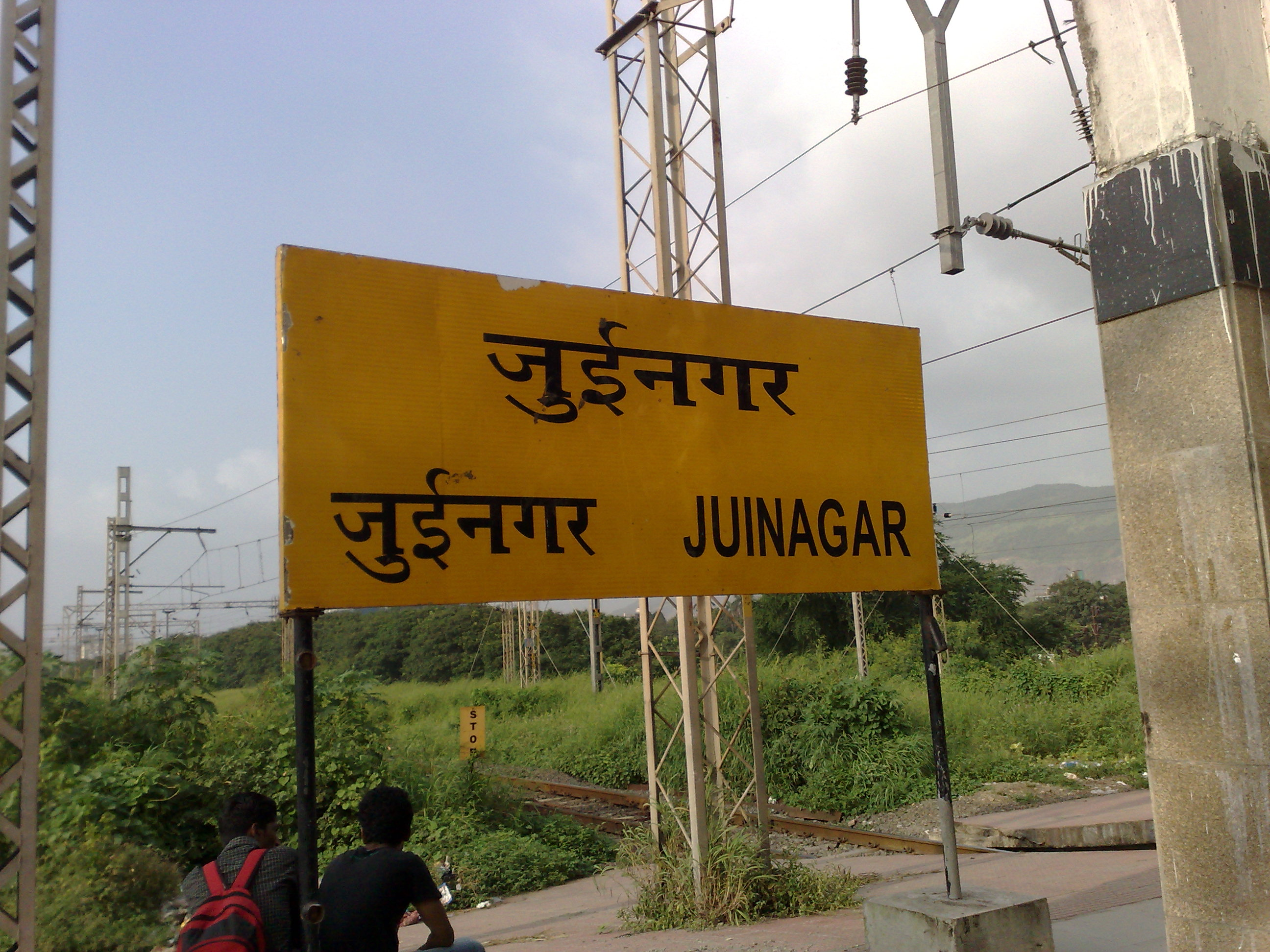

General information
- Coordinates: 19.0560°N 73.0178°E
- System: Mumbai Suburban Railway station
- Owner: Ministry of Railways, Indian Railways
- Line: Harbour Line
- Platforms: 4
- Tracks: 4

Construction
- Structure type: Standard on-ground station

Other information
- Status: Active
- Station code: JNJ
- Fare zone: Central Railways

Services
Preceding station	Mumbai Suburban Railway	Following station
Sanpada towards Chhatrapati Shivaji Terminus	Harbour line	Nerul towards Panvel
Turbhe towards Thane	Trans-Harbour line	Nerul towards Panvel
Route map
Location
- Location within Mumbai

Juinagar is a railway station on the Harbour Line of the Mumbai Suburban Railway network.

Juinagar Station Complex is located in sector 11 of Sanpada node but its very close to Nerul and can be called the external suburb of Nerul. It is adjoining to Sion–Panvel Highway. It is an attractive station complex in terms of location and aesthetics with colourful murals and outrageous fibreglass sculptures and hence is frequently used for film shootings. Station complex consists of shopping area on the ground floor and well-integrated shops/ office premises on the first and second floors. This station caters for three corridors viz. CSMT–Panvel, Thane–Panvel and Nerul–Uran.

It has 4 Platforms. PF 1 is for Trains towards Panvel/Nerul. PF 2 is for trains toward Thane. PF 3 for the trains going towards Panvel and PF 4 for trains towards Goregaon/CSMT.
