= Trans-Harbour line (Mumbai Suburban Railway) =

Rail line in India

Trans-Harbour line

Overview
- Status: Operational
- Owner: Indian Railways
- Locale: Navi Mumbai, Maharashtra; Thane, Maharashtra
- Termini: Thane; Vashi, Panvel
- Stations: 17

Service
- Type: Suburban rail
- System: Mumbai Suburban Railway
- Services: List: Thane–Vashi Thane–Nerul Thane–Belapur Thane–Panvel
- Operator: Central Railways (CR)
- Depot(s): Sanpada, Kalwa
- Rolling stock: Siemens

History
- Opened: 1993; 33 years ago (for goods); 9 November 2004; 21 years ago (for passengers)

Technical
- Line length: 38 km (24 mi)
- Track gauge: 5 ft 6 in (1,676 mm) broad gauge

The Trans-Harbour line is a branch of the Mumbai Suburban Railway's Harbour line that connects Navi Mumbai and Thane and is operated by the Central Railway. Its termini include Thane, Vashi and Panvel on the Thane–Vashi and Thane–Panvel routes. Thane is the common terminus for both the routes.

This line is a double track and does not have any fast trains. It starts from separate platforms (numbers 9 and 10) located at the far east in Thane and runs parallel to the Main line, crossing over Thane Creek until just before the Parsik Tunnel. Here, the line turns southwards and continues until Koparkhairane. At Turbhe, the line branches into two, both running parallel to the Harbour line. The first line joins at Sanpada and terminates at Vashi, while the second line joins at Juinagar and terminates at Panvel.

The stations on the Navi Mumbai side of the Trans-Harbour line were designed by CIDCO. Some IT, corporate, and commercial offices, along with shopping malls, are located above some of these railway stations. As of December 2021, 252 services operate on the Trans-Harbour line in both directions. A total of 12 EMU Rakes ply on this line.

== History ==
The City and Industrial Development Corporation of Maharashtra (CIDCO) was appointed as the new town development authority in 1970. The government acquired land from 95 villages and handed it over to CIDCO for the development of towns. To decongest Mumbai, CIDCO developed 14 nodes in Navi Mumbai. The development of Navi Mumbai International Airport and six railway corridors in Navi Mumbai was meant to increase connectivity between towns, nodes, and mega establishments. The major features of the rail corridors include direct access from residential areas to railway stations by foot, convenient interchange facilities from one corridor to another, double discharge platforms at every station, easy-to-follow routes, and comfortable and pleasant journeys, forming key features of the commuter railway system in Navi Mumbai.

The line was exclusively for freight from 1993 until 2004 when passenger services commenced. It was formally inaugurated on 9 November 2004 by Railway Minister Lalu Prasad Yadav. On 19 January 2013, the conversion of all ten rakes on the Trans-Harbour line into 12-car trains was completed.

The fourth air-conditioned rake of the Mumbai Suburban Railway and the first of the Central Railway was commissioned on 30 January 2020 to serve the Trans-Harbour line. However, in January 2022, the Central Railway ceased operating the only air-conditioned train on the line, citing a poor response from commuters due to low frequency and exorbitant fares.

== Stations ==
Trans-Harbour line
Station Name		Station Code	Platforms	Connections
English	Marathi	Station Code	Platforms	Connections
Thane	ठाणे	T/TNA	9 & 10	Central & Indian Railways
Digha Gaon	दिघा गाव	DIGH	all	none
Airoli	ऐरोली	AIRL	all	none
Rabale	रबाळे	RABE	all	none
Ghansoli	घणसोली	GNSL	all	none
Koparkhairane	कोपरखैरणे	KPHN	all	none
Turbhe	तुर्भे	TUH	all	none
Sanpada	सानपाडा	SNCR	1 & 2	Harbour
Vashi	वाशी	VA/VSH	1	Harbour
Juinagar	जुईनगर	JNJ	1 & 2	Harbour
Nerul	नेरूळ	NU/NEU	1 & 2	Harbour & Port
Seawoods-Darave-Karave	सीवूड्स-दारावे-करावे	SWDK	1 & 2	Harbour & Port
CBD Belapur	सी.बी.डी. बेलापूर	BR/BEPR	1 & 3	Harbour, Navi Mumbai Metro & Port
Kharghar	खारघर	KHAG	1 & 2	Harbour
Mansarovar	मानसरोवर	MANR	3 & 4	Harbour
Khandeshwar	खांदेश्वर	KNDS	1 & 2	Harbour
Panvel	पनवेल	PL/PNVL	1	Harbour, Vasai Road–Roha, Panvel-Karjat Railway Corridor & Indian Railways

== See also ==
- Mumbai Suburban Railway
- List of Mumbai Suburban Railway stations
- Port line (Mumbai Suburban Railway)
- Harbour line (Mumbai Suburban Railway)
