= Wahal =

Village in Maharashtra

- village
- Country: India
- State: Maharashtra
- City: Navi Mumbai
- District: Raigad
- Subdistrict: Panvel

Area
  - Total: 2.05 km^{2} (0.79 sq mi)

Population (2020)
  - Total: 39,498
  - Density: 19,300/km^{2} (49,900/sq mi)

Languages
  - Official: Marathi and English
- Time zone: UTC+5:30 (IST)
- Postal code: 410206
- Vehicle registration: MH-43, MH-46

Wahal is a small village in Navi Mumbai, Panvel taluka, in the Raigad district of Maharashtra, India.
