= Kharghar railway station =

Railway Station in Maharashtra, India

Kharghar

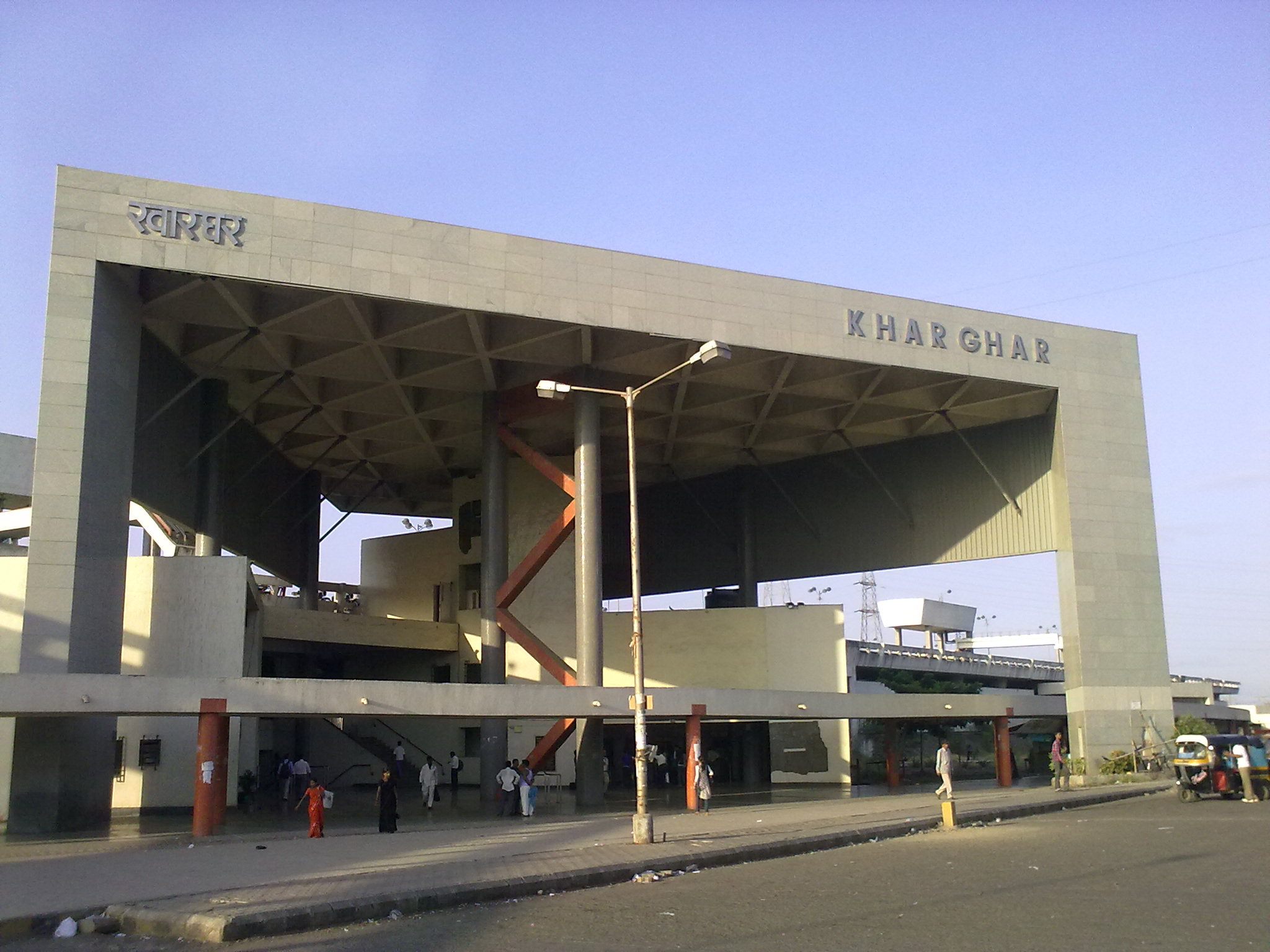
- Kharghar railway station

General information
- Coordinates: 19°01′33″N 73°03′33″E
- System: Mumbai Suburban Railway station
- Owner: Ministry of Railways, Indian Railways
- Line: Harbour line
- Platforms: 4
- Tracks: 4
- Connections: Belpada

Construction
- Structure type: Standard on-ground station

Other information
- Status: Active
- Station code: KHAG
- Fare zone: Central Railway zone

Passengers
- 2012-13: 1,11,793

Services
Preceding station	Mumbai Suburban Railway	Following station
CBD Belapur towards Chhatrapati Shivaji Terminus	Harbour line	Mansarovar towards Panvel
CBD Belapur towards Thane	Trans-Harbour line	Mansarovar towards Panvel
Route map
Location
- Location within Mumbai

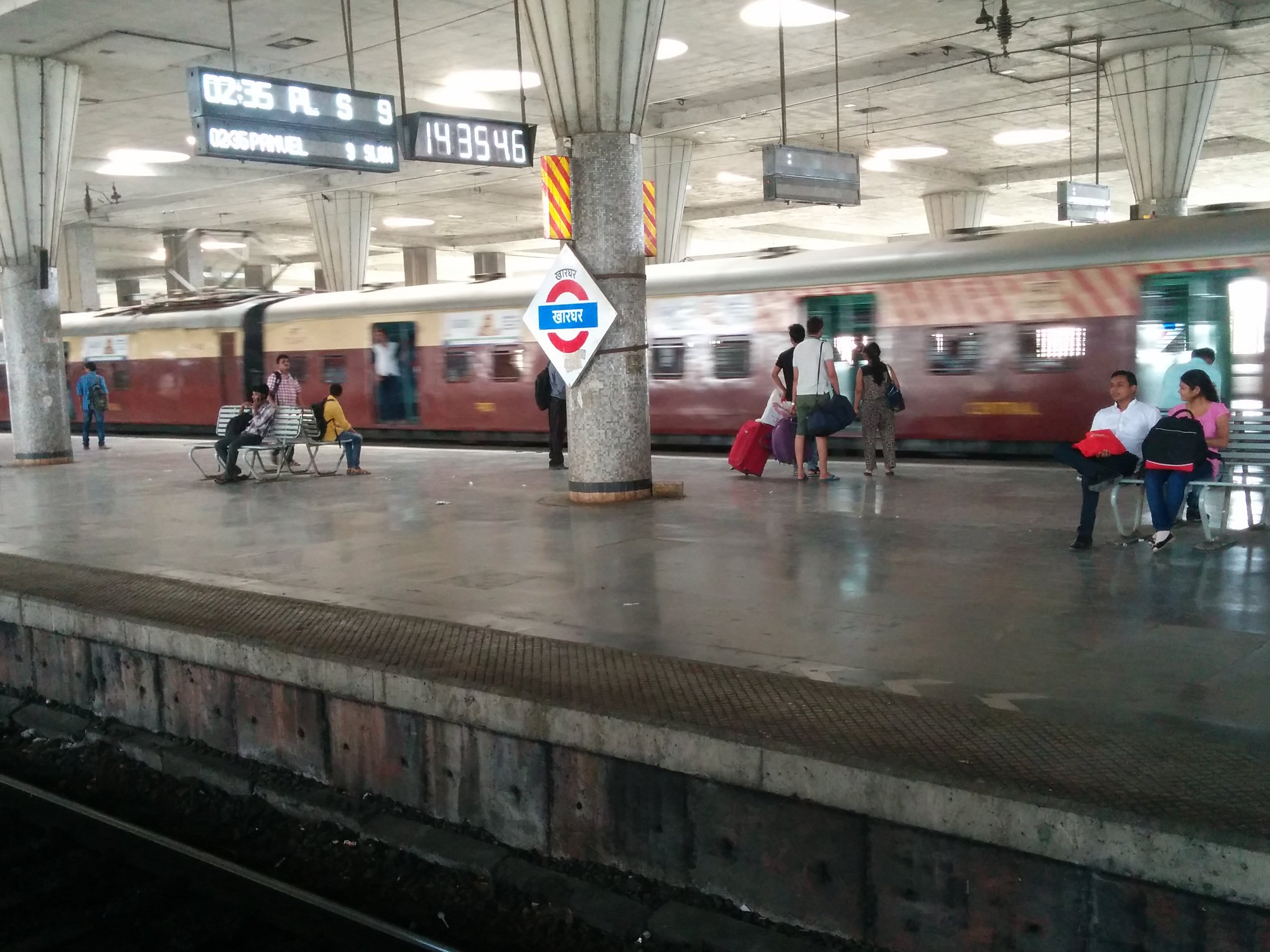
CST-bound local train arriving on platform No. 2

Kharghar is the fourth railway station from Panvel on the Harbour Line of the Mumbai Suburban Railway network. Local trains of the Harbour line in the Central Railway ply between Panvel and Chhatrapati Shivaji Maharaj Terminus stations and the Western line is connected through the Wadala Road station.

It takes about 65 minutes to reach Kharghar by suburban train from Chhatrapati Shivaji Maharaj Terminus. Station code of Kharghar Railway Station is KHAG.

The Kharghar station has a roof that also functions as a full-fledged parking lot which helps create an elevation statement. This idea, an effort to create value from the original brief, accommodates upwards of 1000 vehicles on daily basis functioning as a park and ride facility. Kharghar railway station covers the 2,00,000 sq.ft area.

In Kharghar station there is also bus service from station to Taloja phase 2, station to Kharghar valley Shilp, station to Taloja RAF. Kharghar Railway Station is connected to Belpada Metro Station via a dedicated flyover. This integration allows commuters to switch between the suburban railway and metro system efficiently, enhancing last-mile connectivity within Kharghar and surrounding nodes.

It has 4 Platforms. PF 1 for the trains going towards Panvel and PF 2 for trains towards Thane/Goregaon/CSMT. The other two are used for Parking of trains.
