= Sanpada railway station =

Railway station in Mumbai, India

Sanpada

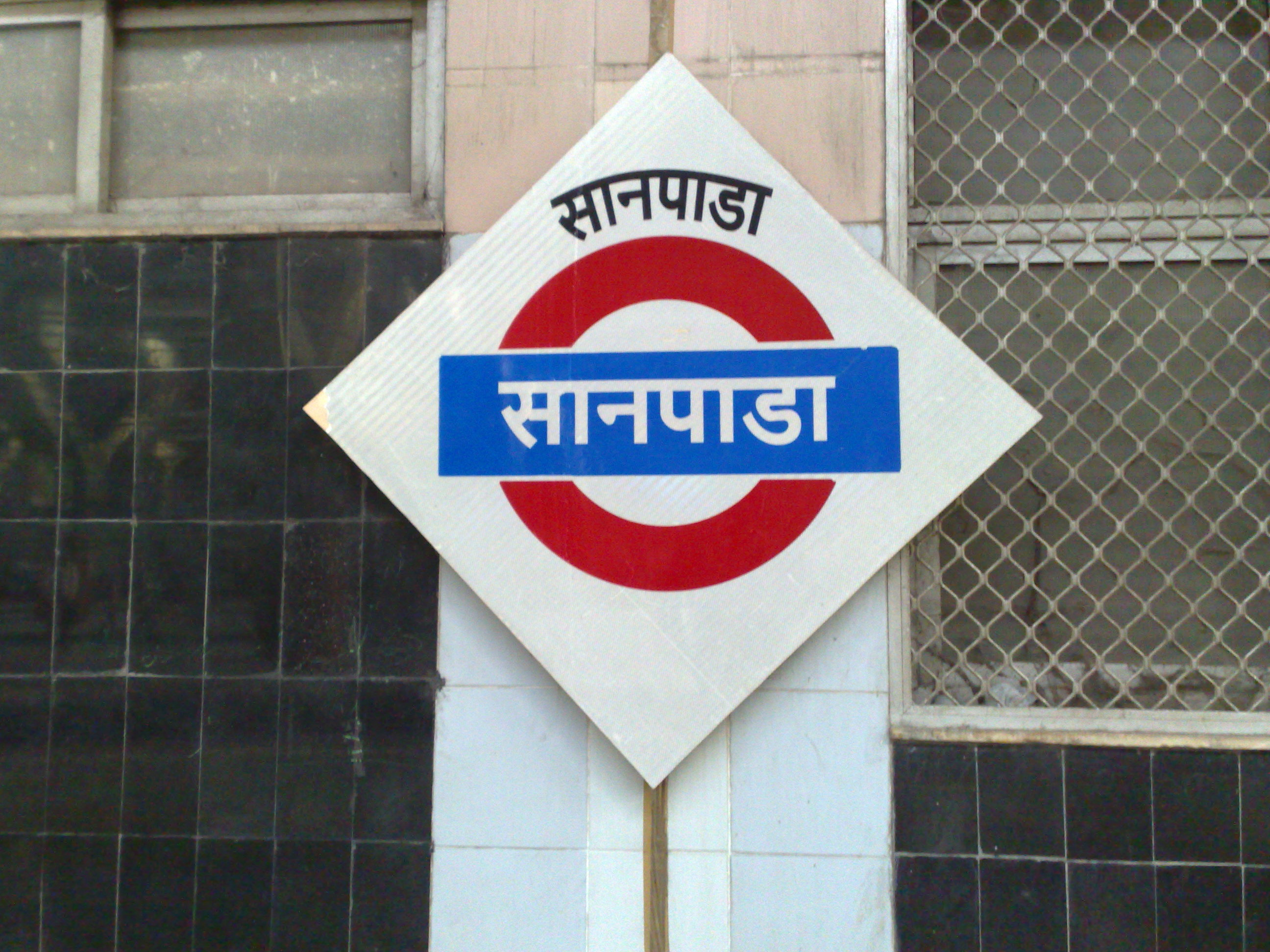
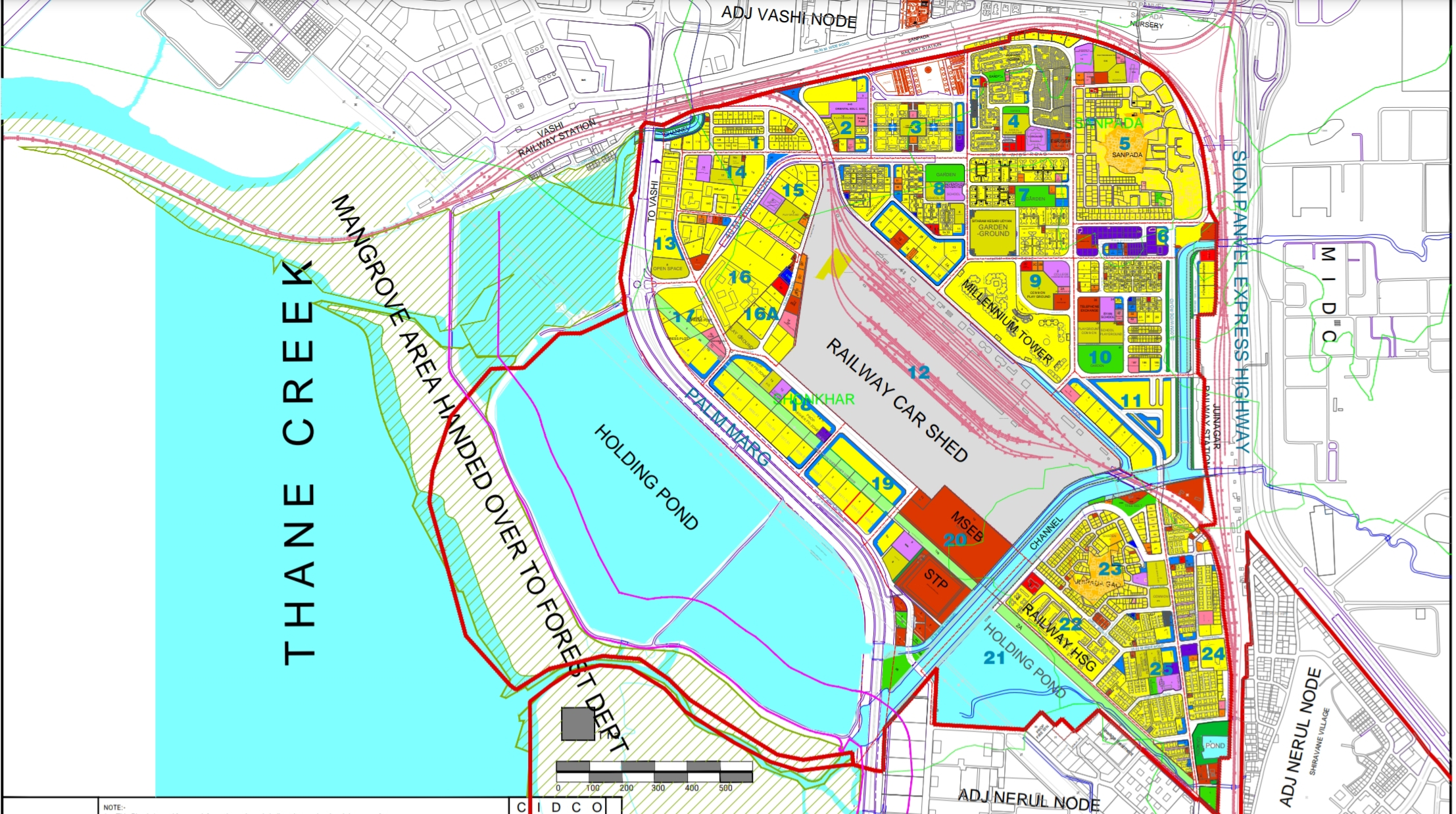
- Sanpada Node of Navi Mumbai

General information
- Coordinates: 19.0660°N 73.0096°E
- System: Mumbai Suburban Railway station
- Owner: Ministry of Railways, Indian Railways
- Line: Harbour Line
- Platforms: 4
- Tracks: 4
- Connections: Sanpada Bus Depot

Construction
- Structure type: Standard on-ground station

Other information
- Status: Active
- Station code: SNCR
- Fare zone: Central Railways

Services
| Preceding station | Mumbai Suburban Railway | Following station |
|---|---|---|
| Vashi towards Chhatrapati Shivaji Terminus | Harbour line | Juinagar towards Panvel |
| Turbhe towards Thane | Trans-Harbour line | Vashi Terminus |
Route map
Location
- Location within Mumbai

Sanpada is a Node of Navi Mumbai; it has railway station on the Harbour Line of the Mumbai Suburban Railway network. Sanpada has railway connections with CSMT, Thane and Panvel.

Sanpada is the smallest Node in Navi Mumbai at 8.6 sq km.

It has 4 Platforms. PF 1 for the trains going towards Thane and PF 2 for trains towards Vashi. PF 3 is for trains towards CSMT/Goregaon and PF 4 is for trains towards Panvel.
