= Port line (Mumbai Suburban Railway) =

Transit link in Maharashtra

Port line

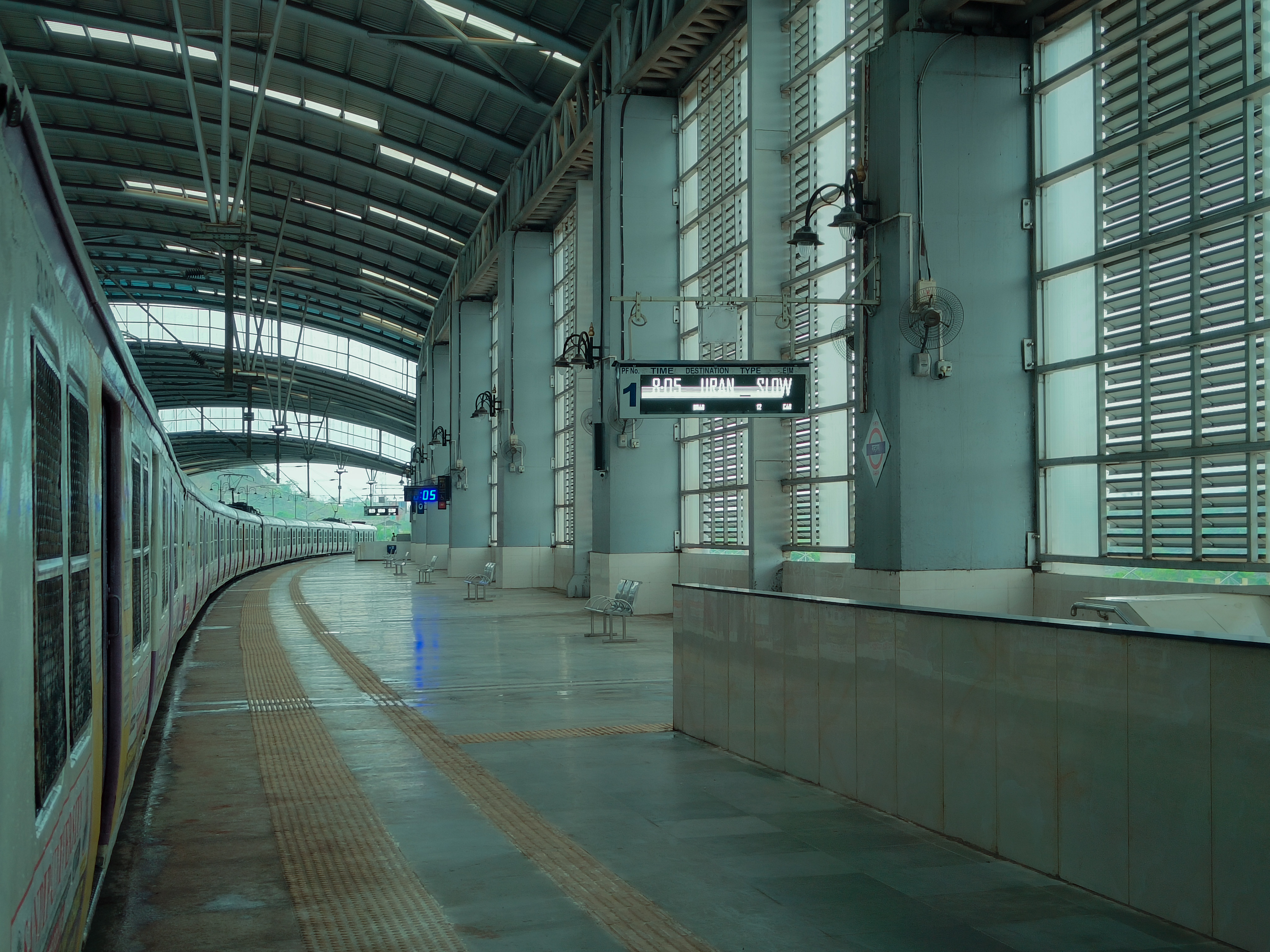
- Uran bound Electric multiple unit

Overview
- Owner: CIDCO and Indian Railways
- Locale: Navi Mumbai, South Navi Mumbai
- Termini: Nerul (West), CBD Belapur (East); Uran (South)
- Stations: 11

Service
- Type: Suburban rail
- System: Mumbai Suburban Railway
- Operator: Central Railway (CR)
- Rolling stock: BHEL, Siemens

History
- Opened: 11 November 2018; 7 years ago

Technical
- Line length: 26.7 km (16.6 mi)
- Character: At Grade
- Track gauge: 5 ft 6 in (1,676 mm) broad gauge
- Electrification: Yes

Port line of the Mumbai Suburban Railway is a railway line located entirely in Navi Mumbai serving from CBD Belapur and Nerul to Uran in South Navi Mumbai, it is a branch line of Harbour line. It was inaugurated on 11 November 2018 and daily services started on 12 November 2018.

This railway line will help to accelerate the growth of Navi Mumbai, Jawaharlal Nehru Port and the Newly developed nodes of Navi Mumbai and also will cater to the passenger traffic demands generated by Jawaharlal Nehru Port, port-based industries, ONGC, the Defence establishment and other residential, industrial, and warehousing complexes in Ulwe and Uran

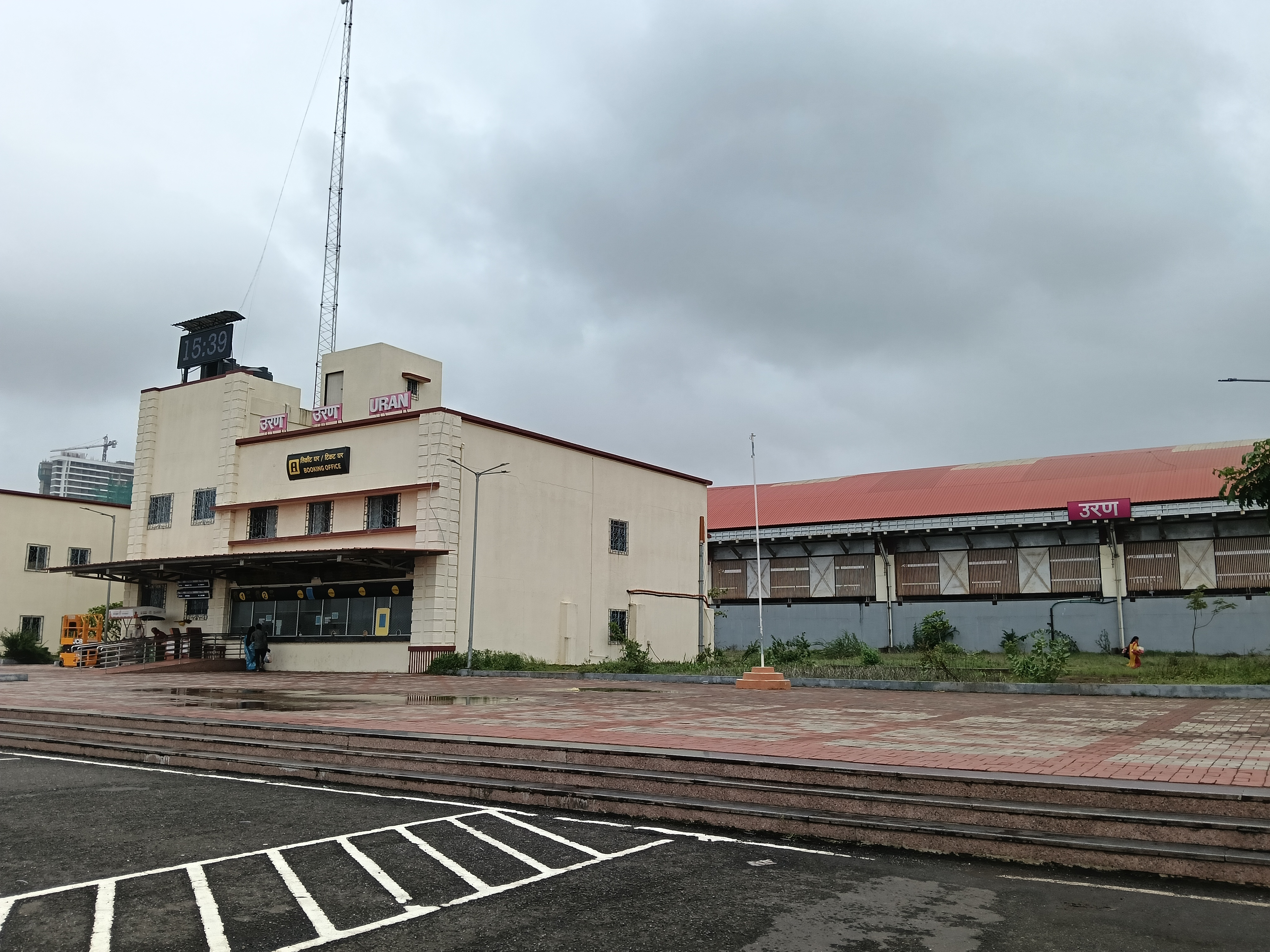
View of Uran Railway Station. The last railway station on the port line.

== Technical specifications ==
The total length of the corridor is 27 km (17 mi) and consists of ten stations; four major bridges; five roads over bridges, 15 roads under bridges, one track under bridge. The 270 m (890 ft) platforms for two Broad gauge (BG) tracks to cater 12-car electric multiple unit rakes with double discharge. The railway track structure shall comprise 60 kg/m (120 lb/yd) I-class rails laid on monoblock prestressed concrete sleepers to 16,660/km (26,810/mi) sleeper density. The bridges will be built to the Modified Broad gauge (MBG) standard of loading. Stone ballast 65 mm (2 1/2 in) gauge with ballast cushion of 300 mm (12 in) below the underside of sleepers will be provided and also provisions are made for one branch of the railway line to go to CBD Belapur. Currently, 4 EMU rakes ply on this line.

This railway line project is divided into three phases :

- Phase I starts from Nerul and CBD Belapur to Kharkopar with station halt at Seawoods-Darave-Karave, Bamandongri and Kharkopar.
- Phase II starts from Kharkopar to Uran with station halt at Shematikhar, Nhava Sheva, Dronagiri and Uran.
- In Phase III, Targhar and Gavan stations were started.

=== Status ===
- In Phase I, Bamandongri and Kharkopar are fully operational and Targhar railway station was still under construction.
- In Phase II, the Construction of all stations lying between Kharkopar and Uran were completed except Gavan railway station and flagged of by PM Narendra Modi on 12 January 2024.
- In Phase III, Targhar and Gavan stations were started fully operational from 15 December 2025.

== History ==
The City and Industrial Development Corporation (CIDCO) was appointed as a New Town Development Authority in 1970. The government acquired land from 95 villages and handed it over to CIDCO for the development of towns. To decongest city centre, Mumbai, CIDCO developed 14 nodes in Navi Mumbai. The development of Navi Mumbai International Airport and six railway corridors in Navi Mumbai were meant to increase connectivity between the towns, nodes and mega establishments. The major features of the rail corridor are direct access from residential areas to the railway stations by foot, convenient interchange facility from one corridor to another, double discharge platforms at every station, easy-to-follow routes and comfortable and pleasant journeys from the key features of the commuter railway system in Navi Mumbai.

The railway Project between CBD Belapur and Nerul-Seawoods-Uran was approved by Ministry of Railways and the CIDCO Board. The work on the project began in July 1997. However, due to various unforeseen reasons, the work was delayed and hence stalled, until recently when the project was revived after the tripartite agreement between Railways, CIDCO and Govt. of Maharashtra was executed on 29 July 2011.

The original estimated cost for the project was ₹495 crore (equivalent to ₹28 billion or US$290 million in 2026) in 1997, which escalated to ₹1,782 crore. The cost is shared by CIDCO and the Indian Railways, 67:33.

Construction of Phase I on this route began in the first week of March 2017. After completion of Phase I, it was commissioned by CRS on 1 November 2018 and after, was inaugurated on 11 November 2018 through video conferencing by Railway Minister Piyush Goyal and Chief Minister of Maharashtra Devendra Fadnavis. More than 3,000 tickets were sold, with earnings of ₹90,000 (US$930) during inauguration day of Phase I.

== Stations ==
Port line
Station Name		Station Code	Connections
English	Marathi	Station Code	Connections
Nerul^{†}	नेरूळ	NU/NEU	Harbour and Trans-Harbour
Seawoods-Darave-Karave^{†}	सीवूड्स-दारावे-करावे	SWDK	Harbour and Trans-Harbour
CBD Belapur^{‡}	सी.बी.डी. बेलापूर	BR/BEPR	Harbour, Trans-Harbour and Navi Mumbai Metro
Targhar	तरघर	TRGR	Navi Mumbai International Airport
Bamandongri	बामणडोंगरी	BMDR	none
Kharkopar	खारकोपर	KR/KARP	none
Gavan	गव्हाण	GAVN	none
Shematikhar	शेमटीखार	SEMK	none
Nhava Sheva	न्हावा शेवा	NESA	none
Dronagiri	द्रोणागिरी	DRGI	none
Uran	उरण	U/URAN	none
† - when travelling from/to Nerul ‡ - when travelling from/to CBD Belapur

== Services ==
Up services
Train No.	Departure	Origin	Arrival	Destination
99702	5:30	Uran	6:03	C.B.D. Belapur
99602	6:10	Uran	6:44	Nerul
99704	6:40	Uran	7:13	C.B.D. Belapur
99604	7:15	Uran	7:49	Nerul
99706	7:45	Uran	8:18	C.B.D. Belapur
99606	8:15	Uran	8:49	Nerul
99708	8:45	Uran	9:18	C.B.D. Belapur
99608	9:15	Uran	9:49	Nerul
99710	9:45	Uran	10:18	C.B.D. Belapur
99610	10:15	Uran	10:49	Nerul
99712	11:15	Uran	11:48	C.B.D. Belapur
99612	12:15	Uran	12:49	Nerul
99714	13:15	Uran	13:48	C.B.D. Belapur
99614	14:15	Uran	14:49	Nerul
99716	15:15	Uran	15:48	C.B.D. Belapur
99616	16:15	Uran	16:49	Nerul
99718	17:15	Uran	17:48	C.B.D. Belapur
99618	18:00	Uran	18:34	Nerul
99720	18:35	Uran	19:08	C.B.D. Belapur
99620	19:05	Uran	19:39	Nerul
99722	19:35	Uran	20:08	C.B.D. Belapur
99622	20:05	Uran	20:39	Nerul
99724	20:50	Uran	21:23	C.B.D. Belapur
99624	21:35	Uran	22:09	Nerul
99726	22:30	Uran	23:03	C.B.D. Belapur

Down services
Train No.	Departure	Origin	Arrival	Destination
99701	5:30	C.B.D. Belapur	6:03	Uran
99601	6:15	Nerul	6:49	Uran
99703	6:45	C.B.D. Belapur	7:18	Uran
99603	7:15	Nerul	7:49	Uran
99705	7:45	C.B.D. Belapur	8:18	Uran
99605	8:15	Nerul	8:49	Uran
99707	8:45	C.B.D. Belapur	9:18	Uran
99607	9:15	Nerul	9:49	Uran
99709	9:45	C.B.D. Belapur	10:18	Uran
99609	10:45	Nerul	11:19	Uran
99711	11:30	C.B.D. Belapur	12:03	Uran
99713	13:00	C.B.D. Belapur	13:33	Uran
99611	13:45	Nerul	14:19	Uran
99715	14:45	C.B.D. Belapur	15:18	Uran
99613	15:45	Nerul	16:19	Uran
99717	17:00	C.B.D. Belapur	17:33	Uran
99615	17:30	Nerul	18:04	Uran
99617	18:00	Nerul	18:34	Uran
99719	18:30	C.B.D. Belapur	19:03	Uran
99619	19:00	Nerul	19:34	Uran
99721	19:30	C.B.D. Belapur	20:03	Uran
99621	20:00	Nerul	20:34	Uran
99723	20:45	C.B.D. Belapur	21:18	Uran
99623	21:30	Nerul	22:04	Uran
99725	22:30	C.B.D. Belapur	23:03	Uran

== See also ==
- Mumbai Suburban Railway
- List of Mumbai Suburban Railway stations
- Harbour line (Mumbai Suburban Railway)
- Trans-Harbour line (Mumbai Suburban Railway)
