= Vashi railway station =

Railway Station in Maharashtra, India

Vashi

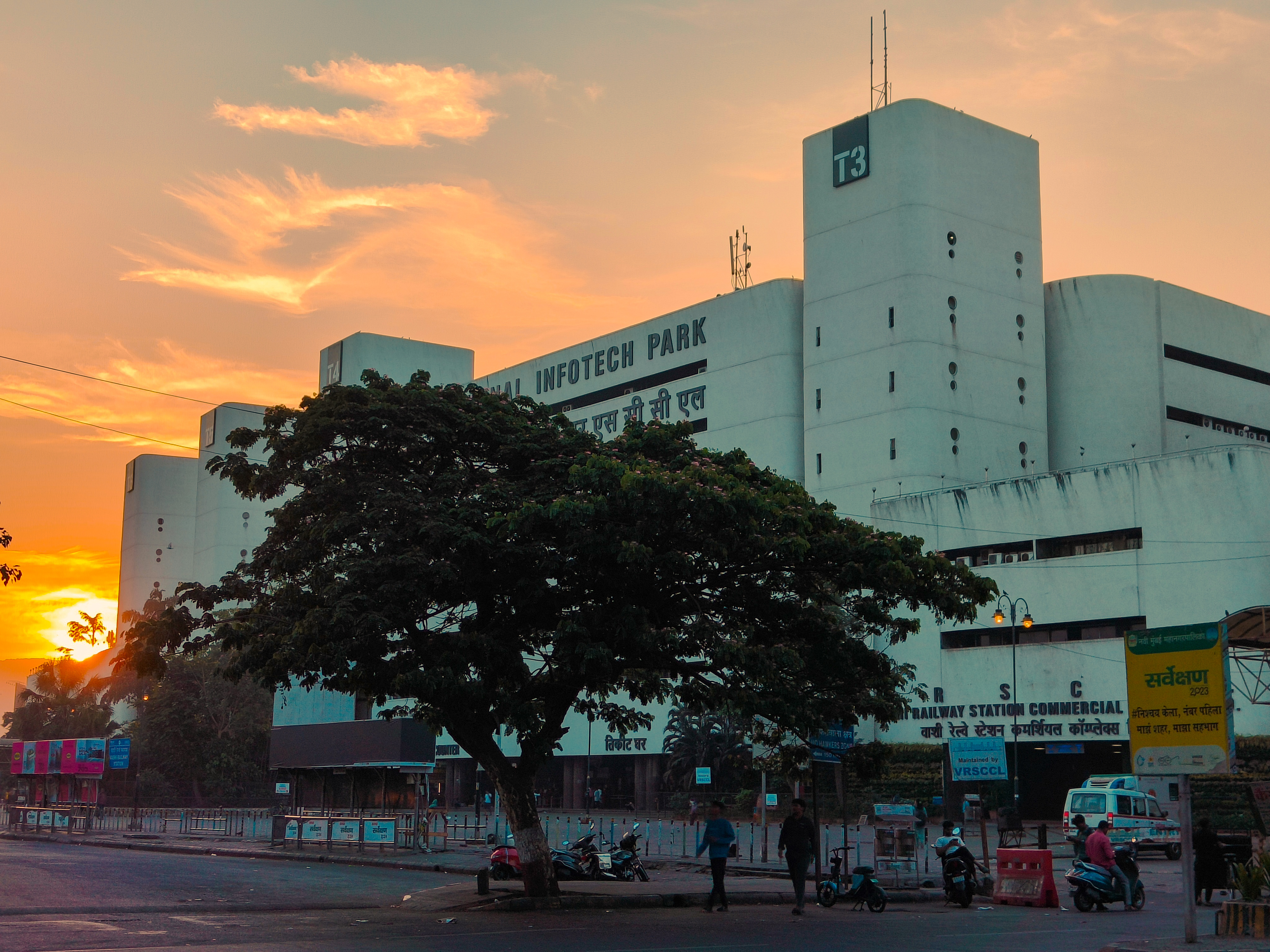
- Vashi railway station

General information
- Coordinates: 19.0632°N 72.9988°E
- System: Mumbai Suburban Railway station
- Owner: Ministry of Railways, Indian Railways
- Line: Harbour Line
- Platforms: 4
- Tracks: 4

Construction
- Structure type: Standard on-ground station

Other information
- Station code: VA (suburban); VSH (mainline)
- Fare zone: Central Railway zone

History
- Opened: 1992

Passengers
- 2012-13: 2,34,769

Services
Preceding station	Mumbai Suburban Railway	Following station
Mankhurd towards Chhatrapati Shivaji Terminus	Harbour line	Sanpada towards Panvel
Sanpada towards Thane	Trans-Harbour line	Terminus
Route map
Location
- Location within Mumbai

Vashi is a railway station on the Harbour Line of the Mumbai Suburban Railway network. Vashi railway station is the terminal point for CSMT and Thane Trains. Around 75,000 people travel from Vashi to Mumbai CSMT, and around 32 thousand people travel towards Panvel every day.

Vashi railway station was built into and under the International Infotech Park, to ISO 9002 quality standards.

It has 4 Platforms. PF 1 for the trains terminating here which go to Thane. PF 2 for trains terminating here which go to CSMT/Thane. PF3 & 4 for trains on the Harbour line.
