= Mumbai CR railway division =

Railway division of India

Mumbai CR railway division is one of the five railway divisions under the jurisdiction of Central Railway zone of the Indian Railways. This railway division was formed on 1853 and its headquarter is located at Mumbai CSMT in the state of Maharashtra of India.

Bhusawal railway division, Solapur railway division, Nagpur railway division, and Pune railway division are the other railway divisions under CR Zone headquartered at Mumbai CSMT.

One of the oldest and important railway project of Ahmednagar railway station was kalyan-Ahmednagar railway project which was in planning stage since British regime. It was referred to as 3rd ghat project. The survey of this project was carried out in 1973, 2000, 2006, 2014 etc. This project was in pink book in 2010. This project could not be started. The alignment length of thus project was 184 km and it could have been shortest route for marathwada, andhra and Telangana. The major challenge for this project is 18.96 km long tunnel in malshej ghat section. Malshej Kriti samiti is following for kalyan ahmednagar railway project. Kalyan-murbad section which is first phase of this project is already under survey stage.

== List of railway stations and towns ==
The list includes the stations under the Mumbai CR division and their station category.

Category of station	No. of stations	Names of stations
A-1	5	Chhatrapati Shivaji Maharaj Terminus, Lokmanya Tilak Terminus, Dadar, Thane, Kalyan Junction
A	2	Lonavala, Panvel
B	2	Matheran, Igatpuri
C suburban station	71	-
D	2	-
E	11	-
F halt station	9	-
Total	102	-

== Routes ==
- CSMT-Kurla-Thane-Kalyan
- Kalyan-Karjat-Lonavala
- Kalyan-Kasara-Igatpuri
- CSMT-Kurla-Vashi-Panvel
- Thane-Turbhe-Vashi/Nerul
- Panvel-Karjat Railway Corridor
- Uran-Kharkopar-Nerul/CBD Belapur
- Vasai Road-Diva-Panvel-Roha
- Neral-Aman Lodge-Matheran

== One Rupee Clinics ==
To provide speedy medical assistance to rail accident victims, central railway in association with Magicdil, have established 24 by 7 one rupee clinics across 14 Mumbai railway stations.
