= Uran railway station =

Railway Station in Maharashtra, India

Uran

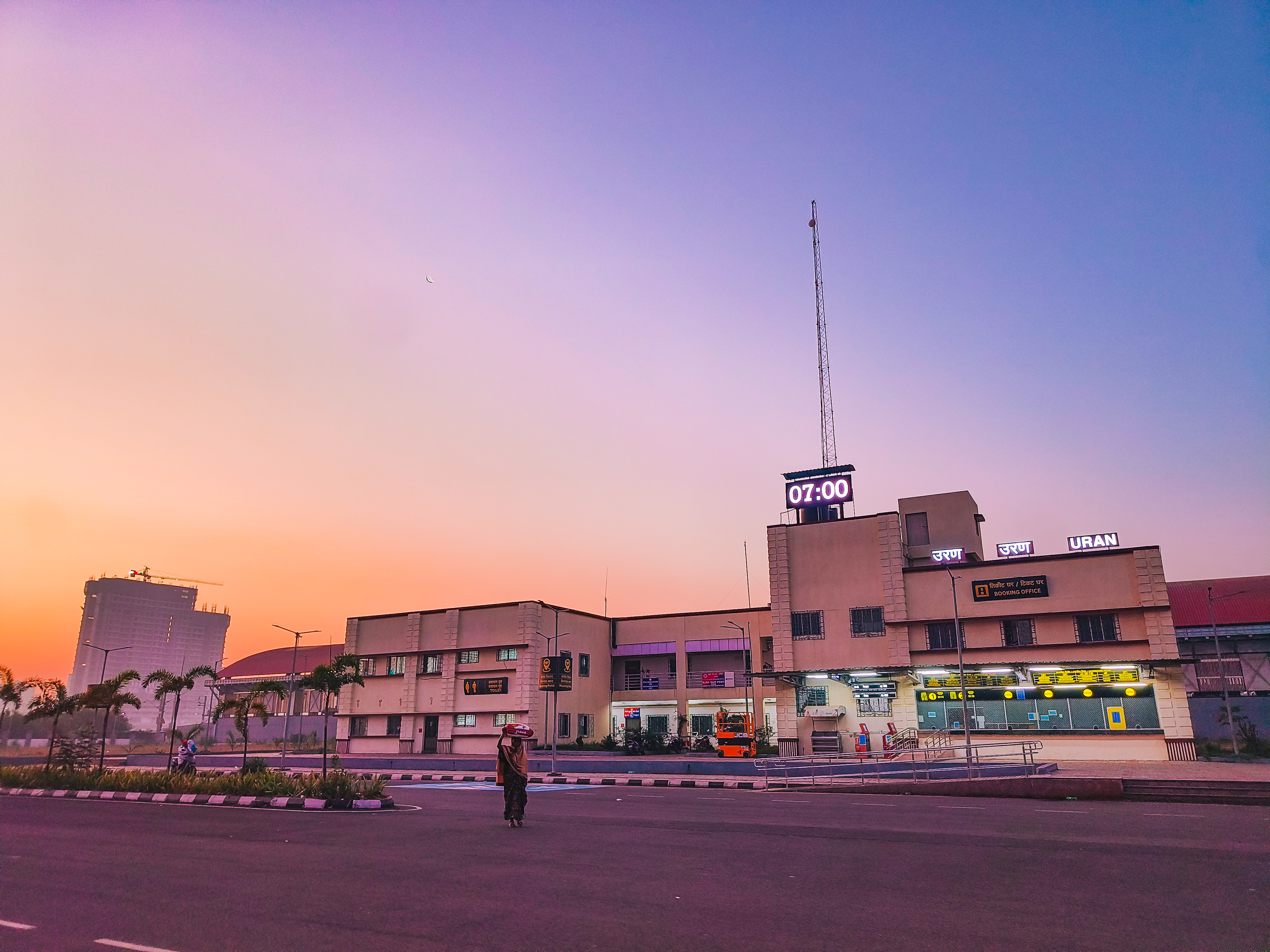
- Uran railway station

General information
- Location: Uran, Raigad, Navi Mumbai, Maharashtra; India
- Coordinates: 18.878412°N 72.952493°E
- Elevation: 6 metres (20 ft)
- System: Mumbai Suburban Railway station
- Owner: Indian Railways
- Operator: Central Railway zone
- Line: Port line
- Platforms: 2
- Tracks: 4
- Connections: Auto stand

Construction
- Structure type: Standard (on-ground station)
- Parking: No
- Cycle facilities: No

Other information
- Status: Operational
- Station code: U
- Zone(s): Central Railway zone
- Division(s): Mumbai CR

History
- Opened: 12 January 2024; 2 years ago

Services
Preceding station	Mumbai Suburban Railway	Following station
Dronagiri towards Nerul or CBD Belapur	Port line	Terminus
Route map
Location
- Location within Maharashtra
- Location of Uran railway station

Uran is a railway station in Raigad district, Maharashtra. Its station code is URAN. It serves Uran, a node of Navi Mumbai. This station has 2 platforms.

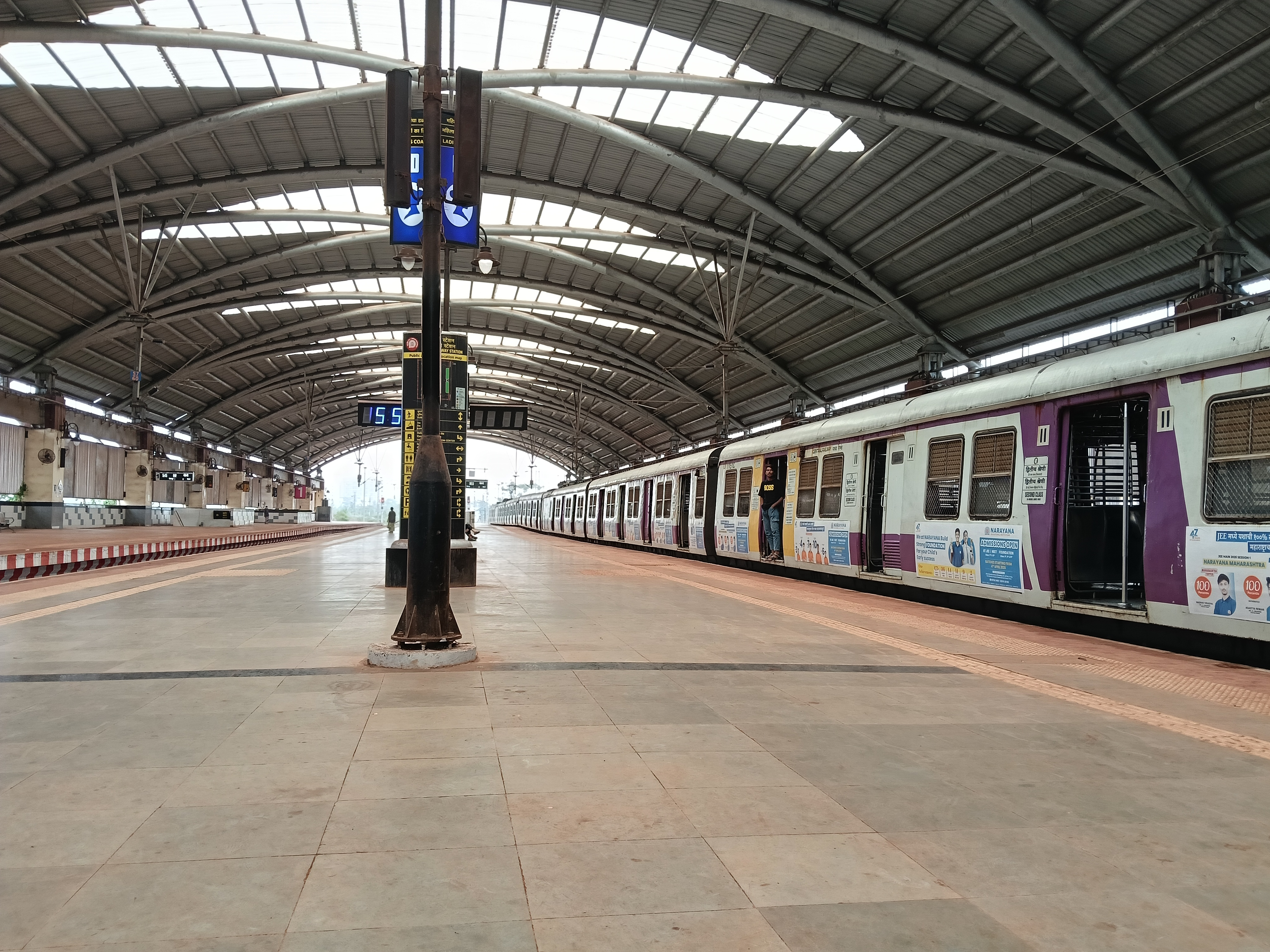
View of the Mumbai Suburban local train at the Uran Railway Station.
