= CBD Belapur railway station =

Railway station in Maharashtra, India

CBD Belapur

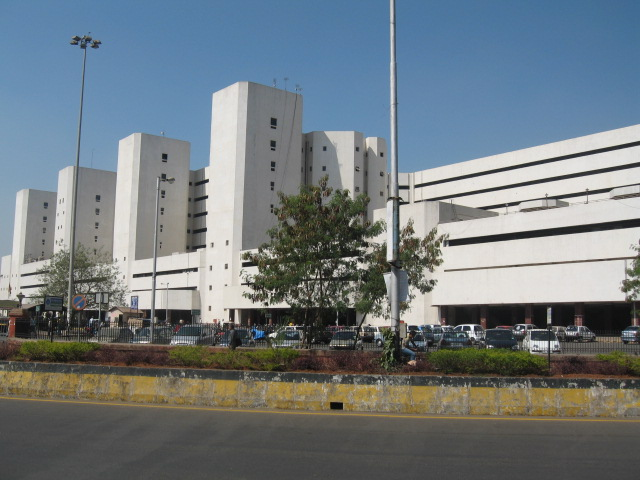
- CBD Belapur Railway Station

General information
- Coordinates: 19°01′07″N 73°02′20″E
- System: Mumbai Suburban Railway station
- Owner: Ministry of Railways, Indian Railways
- Lines: Harbour line, Trans-Harbour line, Port line
- Platforms: 4
- Tracks: 4
- Connections: CBD Belapur

Construction
- Structure type: Standard on-ground station
- Cycle facilities: Yes

Other information
- Status: Active
- Station code: BR (suburban); BEPR (mainline)
- Fare zone: Central Railway zone

Passengers
- 2012-13: 1,82,851

Services
Preceding station	Mumbai Suburban Railway	Following station
Seawoods-Darave-Karave towards Chhatrapati Shivaji Terminus	Harbour line	Kharghar towards Panvel
Seawoods-Darave-Karave towards Thane	Trans-Harbour line	Kharghar towards Panvel
Terminus	Port line	Targhar towards Uran
Route map
Location
- Location within Mumbai

CBD Belapur is a railway station on the Harbour Line of the Mumbai Suburban Railway network. It serves the Central Business District of Navi Mumbai. Around 50,000 people travel towards CSMT and 15,000 travel towards Panvel every day. Navi Mumbai Metro starts from Belapur terminal metro station which is built adjacent to the railway station.

It has 4 Platforms. PF 1 is for trains going towards Panvel. PF 2 is for trains originating from here. PF 3 is trains Going to CSMT/Goregaon/Thane and PF 4 is for trains going towards Uran.

When constructed it was the largest station complex in Navi Mumbai. It also has a provision for landing of helicopters on the deck.
