= Nerul railway station =

Railway Station in Maharashtra, India

Nerul

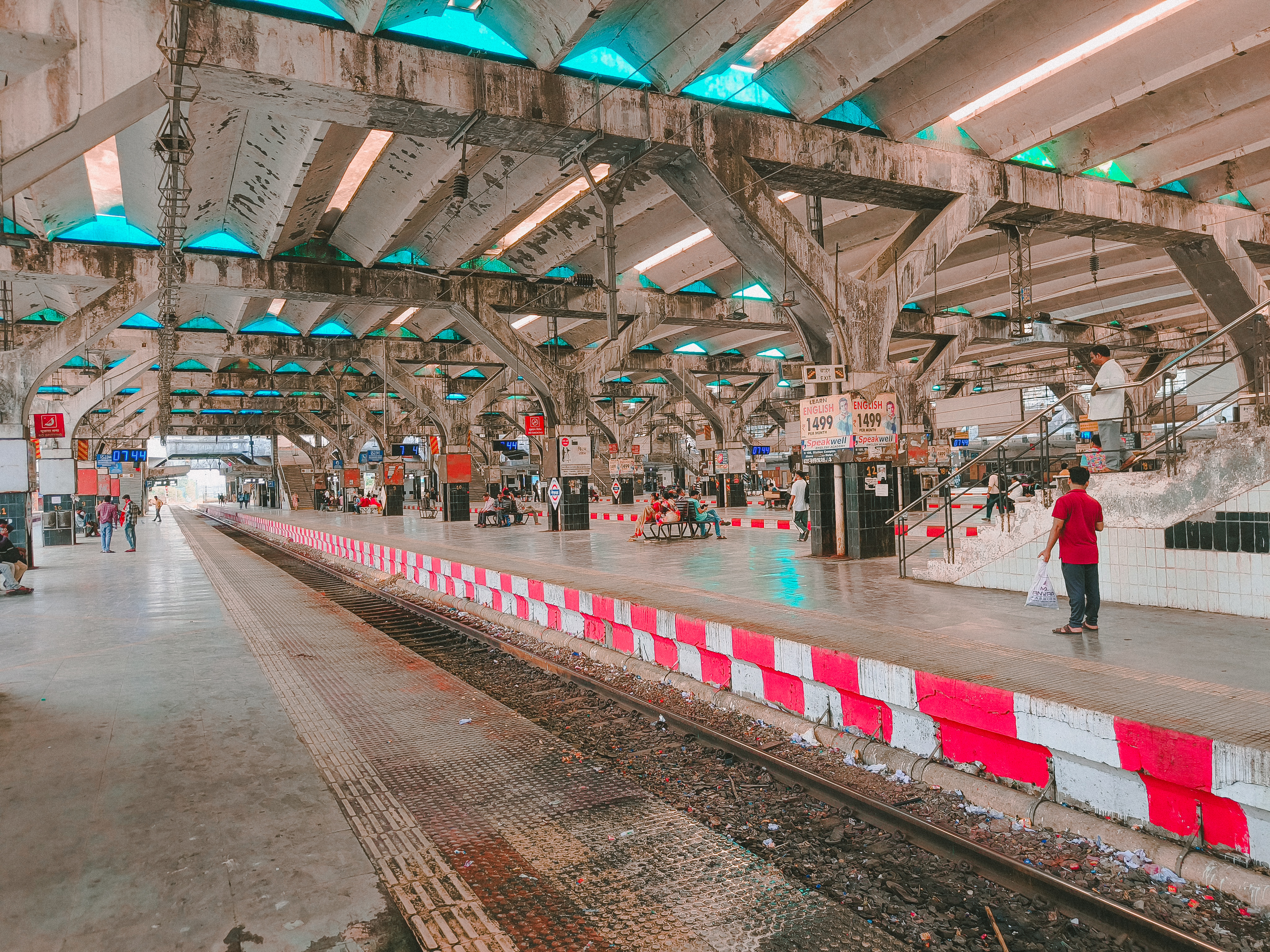

General information
- Coordinates: 19.0336°N 73.0181°E
- System: Mumbai Suburban Railway station
- Owner: Ministry of Railways, Indian Railways
- Lines: Harbour line, Trans-Harbour line, Port line
- Platforms: 6
- Tracks: 6

Construction
- Structure type: Standard on-ground station

Other information
- Station code: NEU
- Fare zone: Central Railway zone

Passengers
- 2012-13: 1,03,923

Services
Preceding station	Mumbai Suburban Railway	Following station
Juinagar towards Chhatrapati Shivaji Terminus	Harbour line	Seawoods-Darave-Karave towards Panvel
Juinagar towards Thane	Trans-Harbour line	Seawoods-Darave-Karave towards Panvel
Terminus	Port line	Seawoods-Darave-Karave towards Uran
Route map
Location
- Location within Mumbai

Nerul is a railway station on the Harbour Line of the Mumbai Suburban Railway network. Around 1,00,000 people travel from Nerul towards Mumbai CSMT daily, and around 50,000 people travel in the Panvel direction every day. Nerul station is a terminus station for Port line and Trans-Harbour line, respectively.

It has 6 platforms. PF 1 is for trains going to Panvel or Terminating here. PF 2 is for trains going to Thane via Nerul. PF 3 is for trains Going towards CBD Belapur/Panvel. PF 4 is for trains Going towards CSMT/Goregaon. PF 5&6 are for Trains going to Uran.
