= Dronagiri =

Node in Navi Mumbai, Maharashtra

- Node of Navi Mumbai
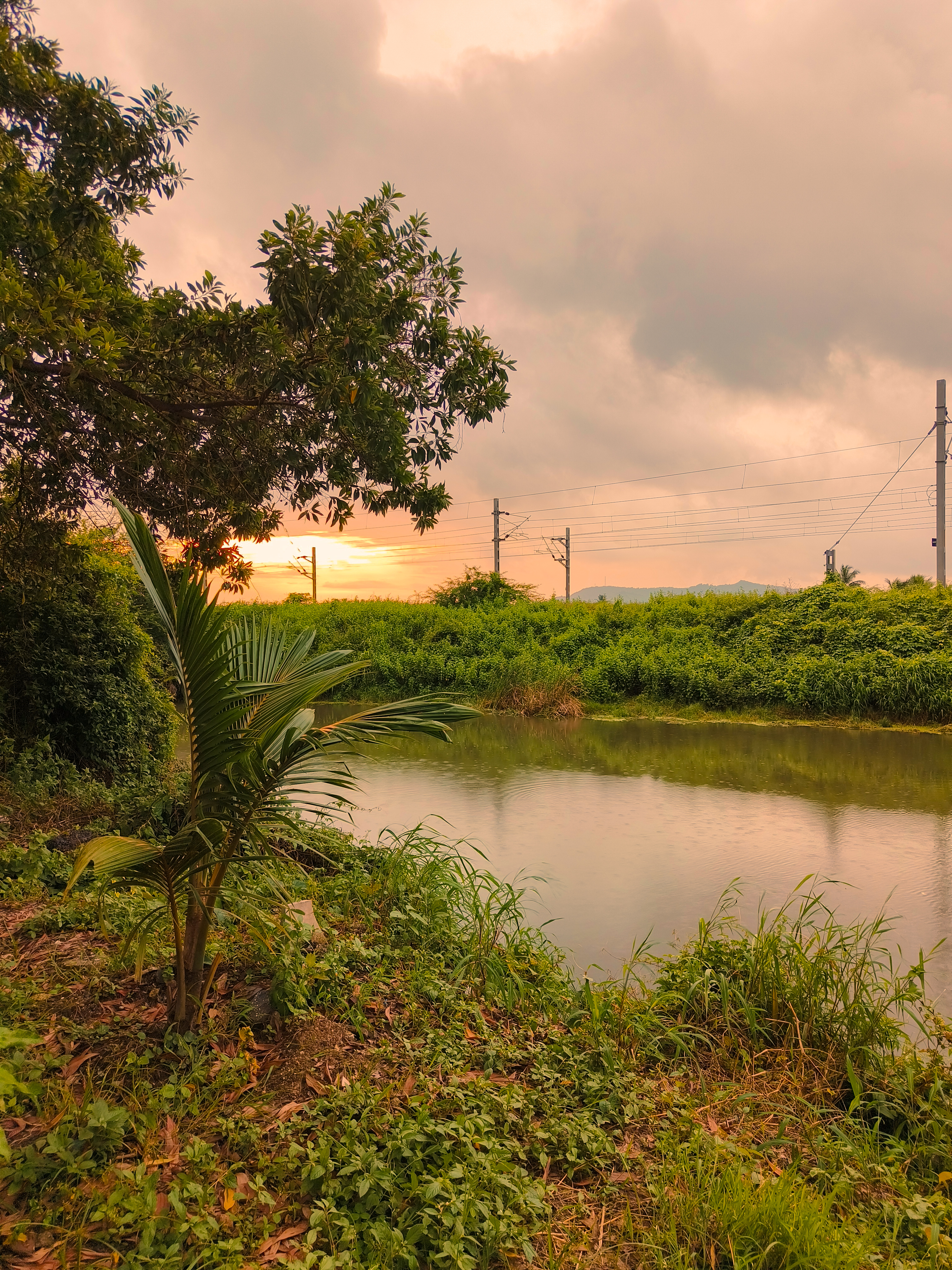
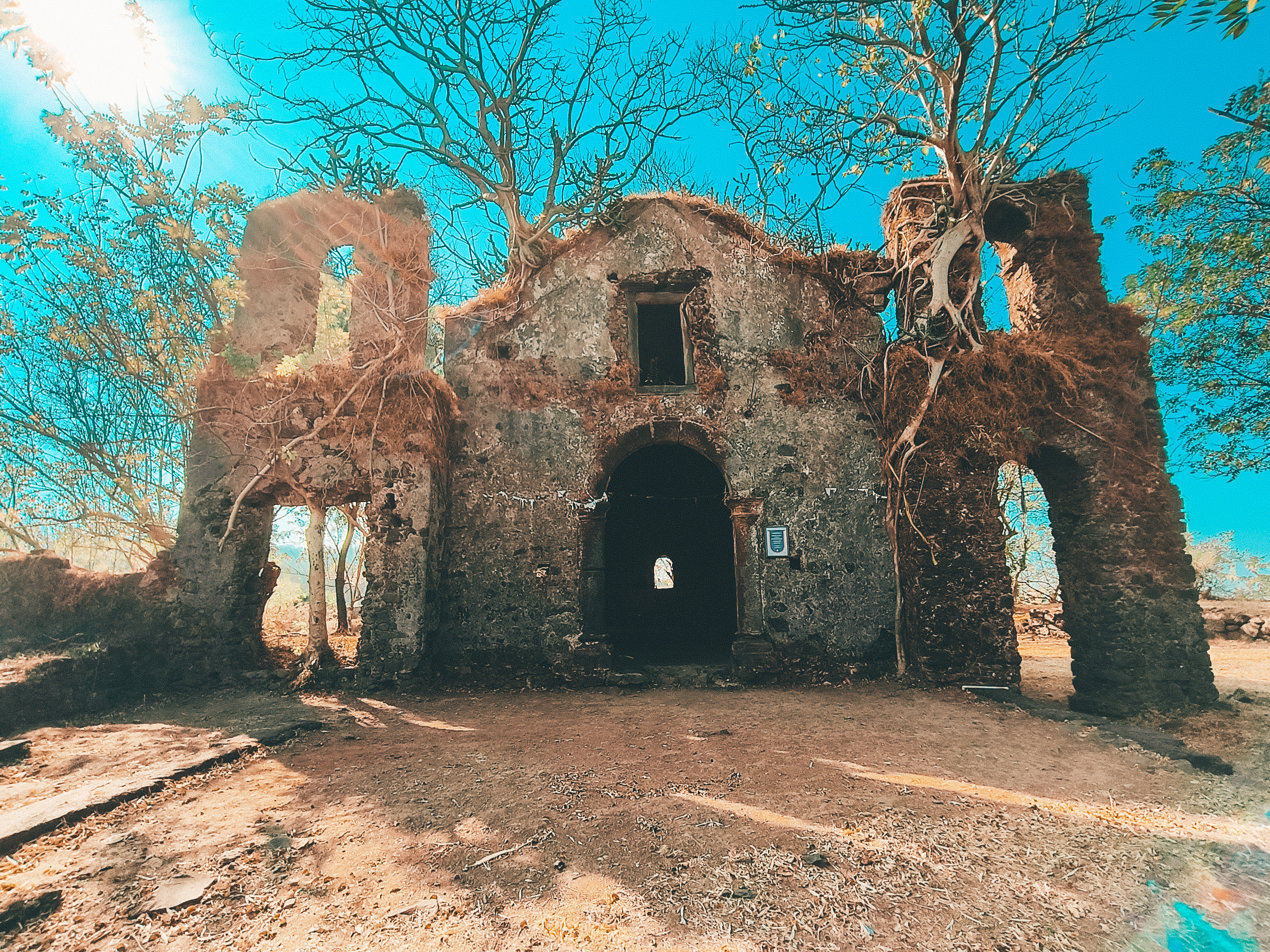
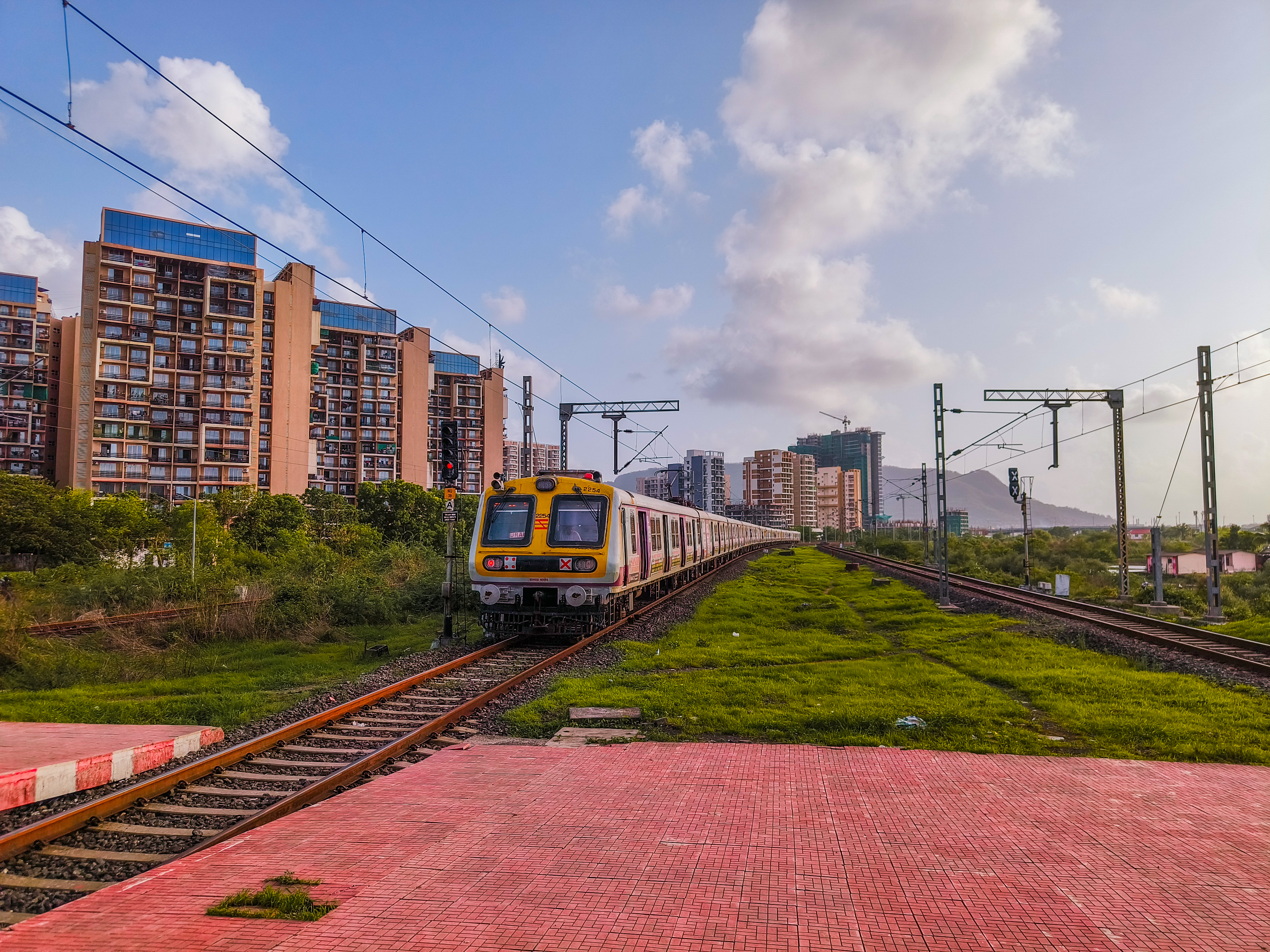
- Dronagiri skyline Dronagiri Talav Sv. Ba. V Chowk Dronagiri Gadkilla Port line Karanja khadi
- Interactive map of Dronagiri
- Location within Maharashtra Location within India
- Coordinates: 18.875431°N 72.961658°E
- Country: India
- State: Maharashtra
- City: Navi Mumbai
- District: Raigad
- Taluka: Uran
- Vidhan Sabha constituency: Uran
- Lok Sabha constituency: Maval

Government
  - Type: City planning agency
  - Body: CIDCO (City and Industrial Development Corporation)

Area
  - Total: 12.50 km^{2} (4.83 sq mi)

Population ((est.) 2025)
  - Total: (approx.) 8,500
- Demonym(s): Dronagirikar, Navi Mumbaikar

Languages
  - Official: Marathi
- Time zone: UTC+5:30 (IST)
- PIN: 400702, 400707
- Telephone code: 022
- Vehicle registration: MH-46

Dronagiri is a node of Navi Mumbai located on a peninsula in South Navi Mumbai's Raigad district. Dronagiri railway station, on the Port line provides suburban rail connectivity, while road links connect the node to Uran, JNPT, and other parts of Navi Mumbai and Mumbai, respectively.

The node is located to the east of Uran and is bound by the Karanja creek on the south-east. Residential areas of Karanja, Chanje, Navin Sheva are located to the west and Kaladhonda, Bokadvira to the north-west of the node, while the Jawaharlal Nehru Port (JNPT) area and township are located towards the north of the node. The node is adjacent to the JNPT port, and is located farthest from the central business districts of Belapur, Nerul and Vashi. Due to its proximity to the port, this node is ideal for port-based industries.

== Introduction ==
Navi Mumbai is envisaged as a metro-sized counter magnet to reduce the pressure on the Mumbai metropolis. It is planned as a polycentric new town with a series of nodal concentrations along mass-transport corridors. It is anticipated to have 14 of these townships when it is fully constructed, with a total population holding capacity of four million people and one million jobs. Dronagiri is one of these 14 nodes and is being developed by CIDCO. Dronagiri has a mountain near the sea and has a Dronagiri Fort Old Church.

== Topography ==
The topography includes a hilly region towards the west of the zone. The region receives rather heavy rainfall regularly during the months of August through November and in order to ensure proper drainage of the area, CIDCO has constructed holding ponds in the area to allow water to accumulate during high tide and heavy downpour. During low tide, water from the holding ponds flows back into the sea.

The zone is characterized by loose soil with low bearing capacity and black stiff clay. Construction work could, therefore, require pile foundation.

Basic infrastructure has already been developed in the zone, and around 350 ha (20 percent of land) has already been sold. In addition, around 90 ha is currently being used for commercial purposes. There is a multispeciality hospital 125 bedded called Carepoint Hospital. This is the only multispeciality hospital in this node.

== Navi Mumbai International Airport ==
Navi Mumbai International Airport was conceived because of the excessive pressure in Mumbai International Airport. It is spread over an area of 1160 hectares. The proposed new Navi Mumbai International Airport was initially expected to be operational by 2014 in the Kopra area between Khandeshwar and Kamothe. This was passed by CIDCO on 1 August 2009. Despite getting environmental clearance from the Centre almost three years ago, the project was stuck due to protracted negotiations with farmers who wanted a compensation package of Rs 20 crore per hectare or 35 percent of the land bank as a developed plot.

The project, which will come upon 1,160 hectares of land, will be built in four phases. The first phase with an annual capacity of 10 million passengers will be completed by 2019. After the completion of the whole project, it will cater to about 60 million passengers a year.

The affected villagers will mostly be rehabilitated in a new township called Pushpak Nagar and in Wadghar and Wahal villages around the project area. Under the project plan, the rare island village of Waghivali in Panvel creek will be converted into a mangrove lagoon and its ecology will be maintained

A new sea link between Nhava Sheva and Sewri would be completed by Oct 2022 thus making the new airport accessible to not only Navi Mumbai residents but also the residents of South Mumbai as well.
