= South Navi Mumbai =

- Informal region within Navi Mumbai
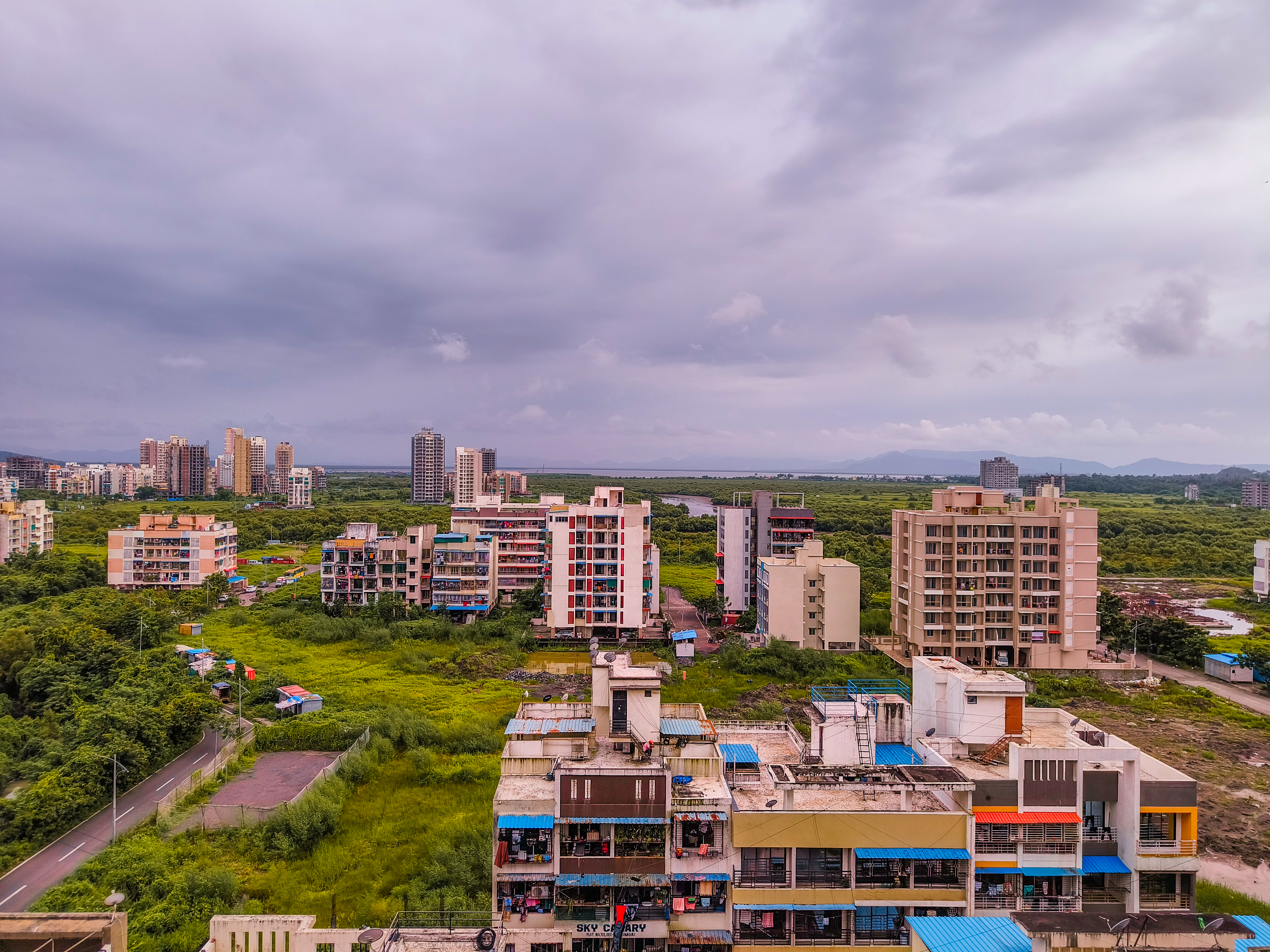
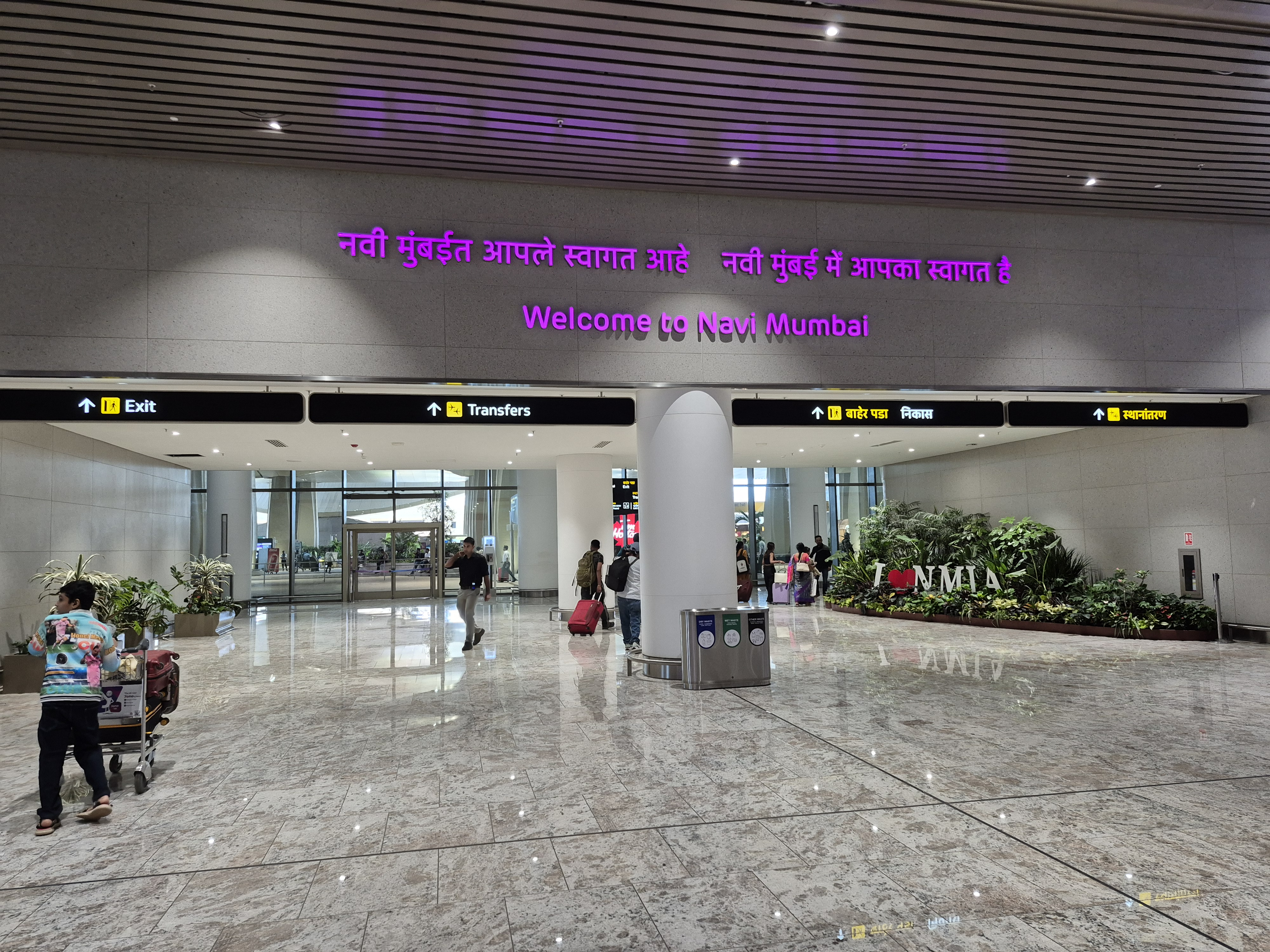
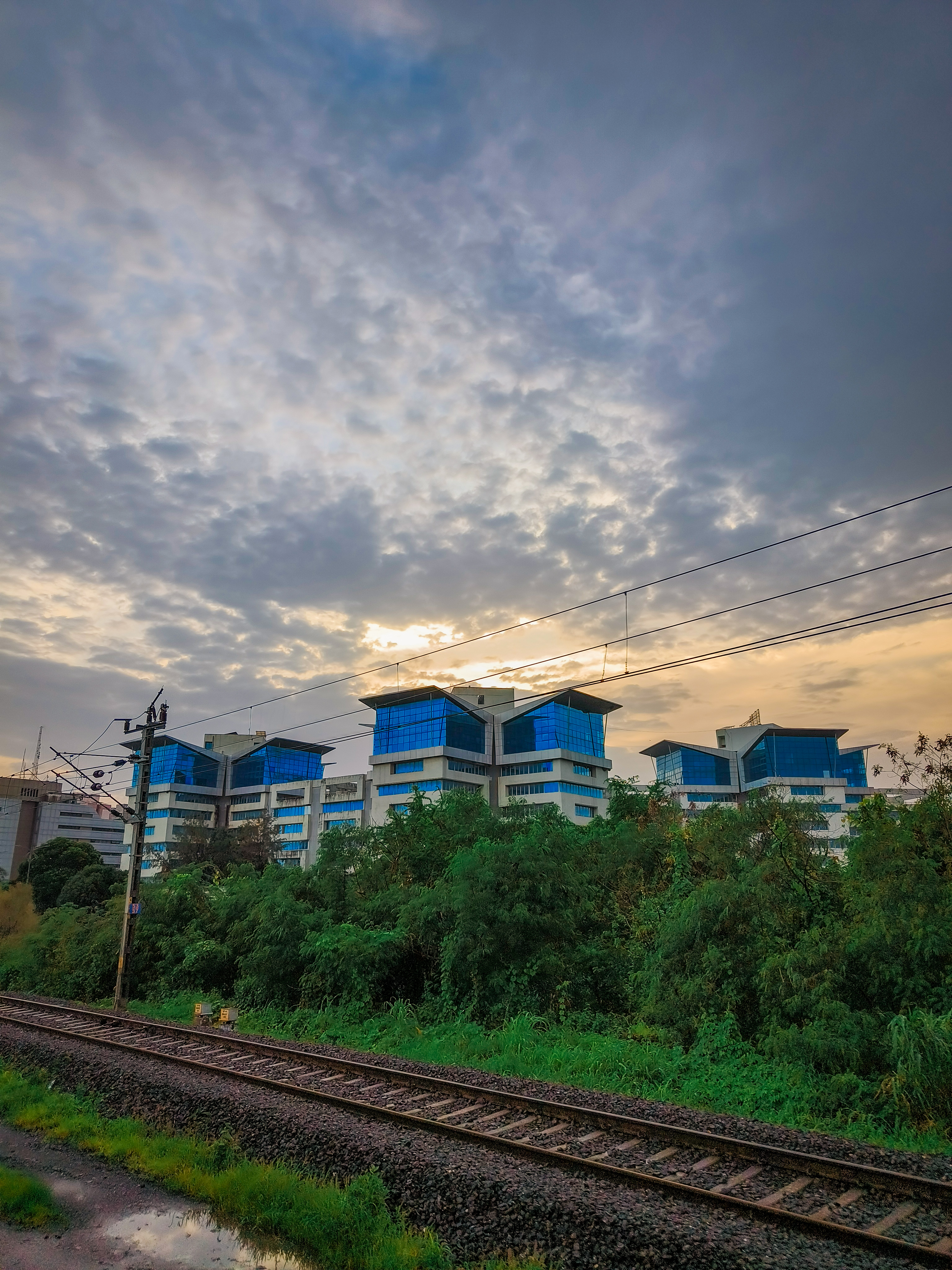
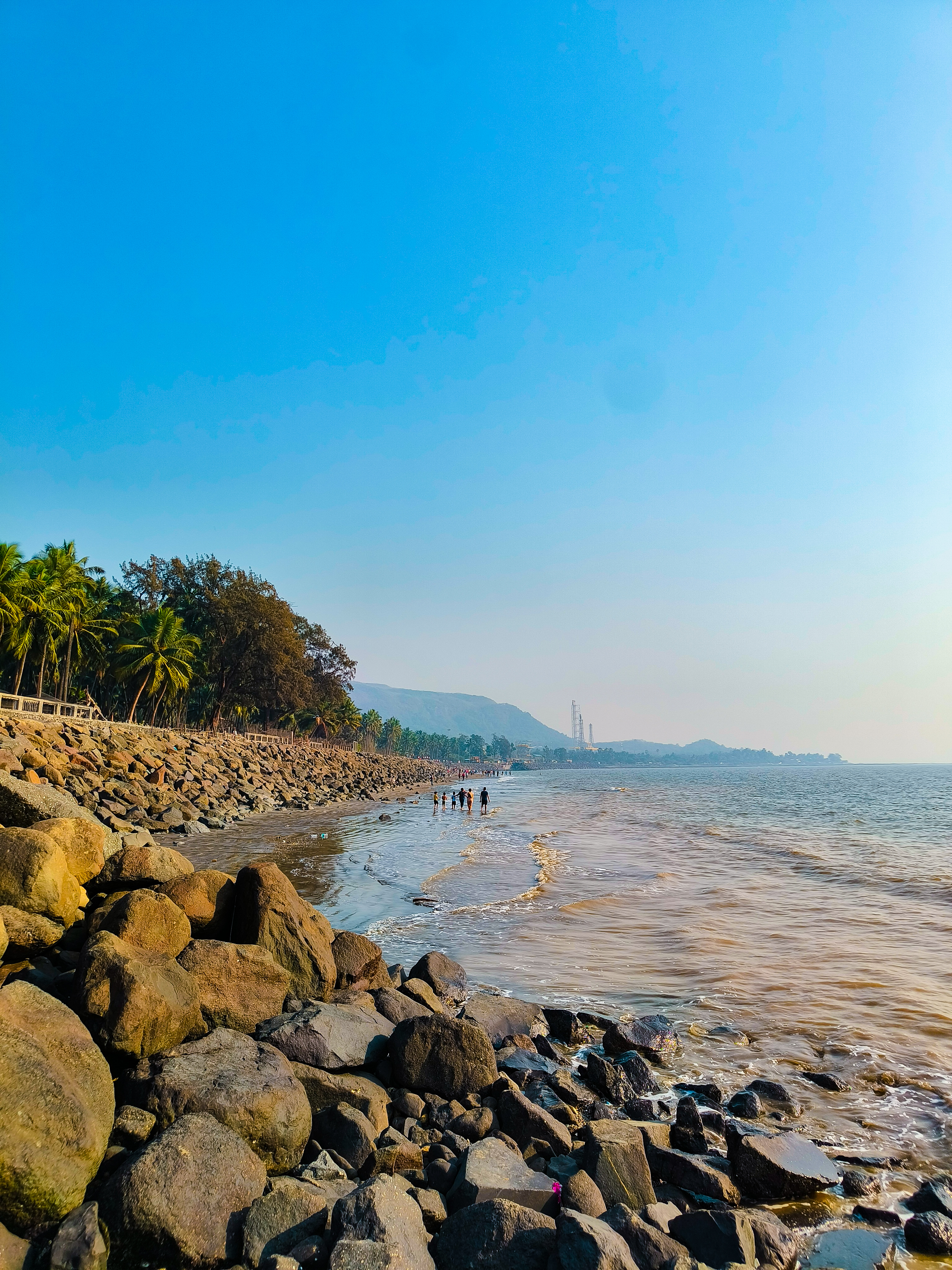
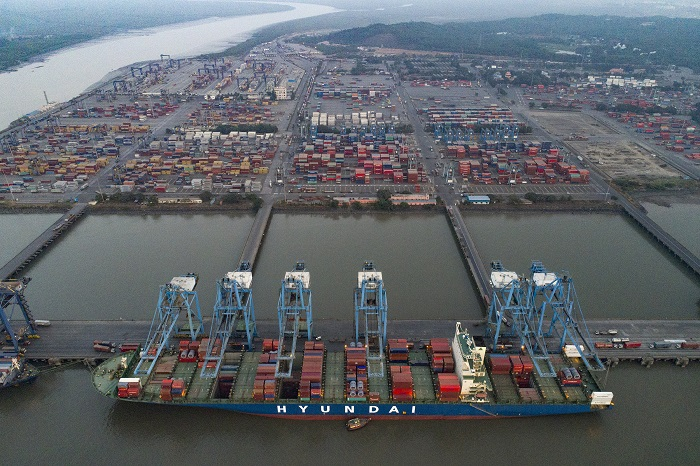
- Dronagiri skyline Navi Mumbai International Airport Nhava Sheva Ulwe skyline Dronagiri tekdi Uran Nagav Chowpatty Panvel khadi Nhava Sheva Port
- Country: India
- State: Maharashtra
- Division: Konkan division
- City: Navi Mumbai
- District: Raigad district
- Taluka: Panvel, Uran
- Planned as part of: Navi Mumbai development (1971)

Government
  - Body: City and Industrial Development Corporation (planning authority); Raigad District Administration
- Time zone: UTC+5:30 (IST)
- Vehicle registration: MH-46
- Website: cidco.maharashtra.gov.in

South Navi Mumbai is a colloquial term for southern nodes of Navi Mumbai. The region includes nodes of Dronagiri, Ulwe and Uran. These nodes are developed and planned by the City and Industrial Development Corporation (CIDCO). It lies in Raigad district and forms part of the Mumbai Metropolitan Region (MMR).
