= Belapur Fort =

Hill fort in Navi Mumbai, India

- Belapur, Navi Mumbai, India
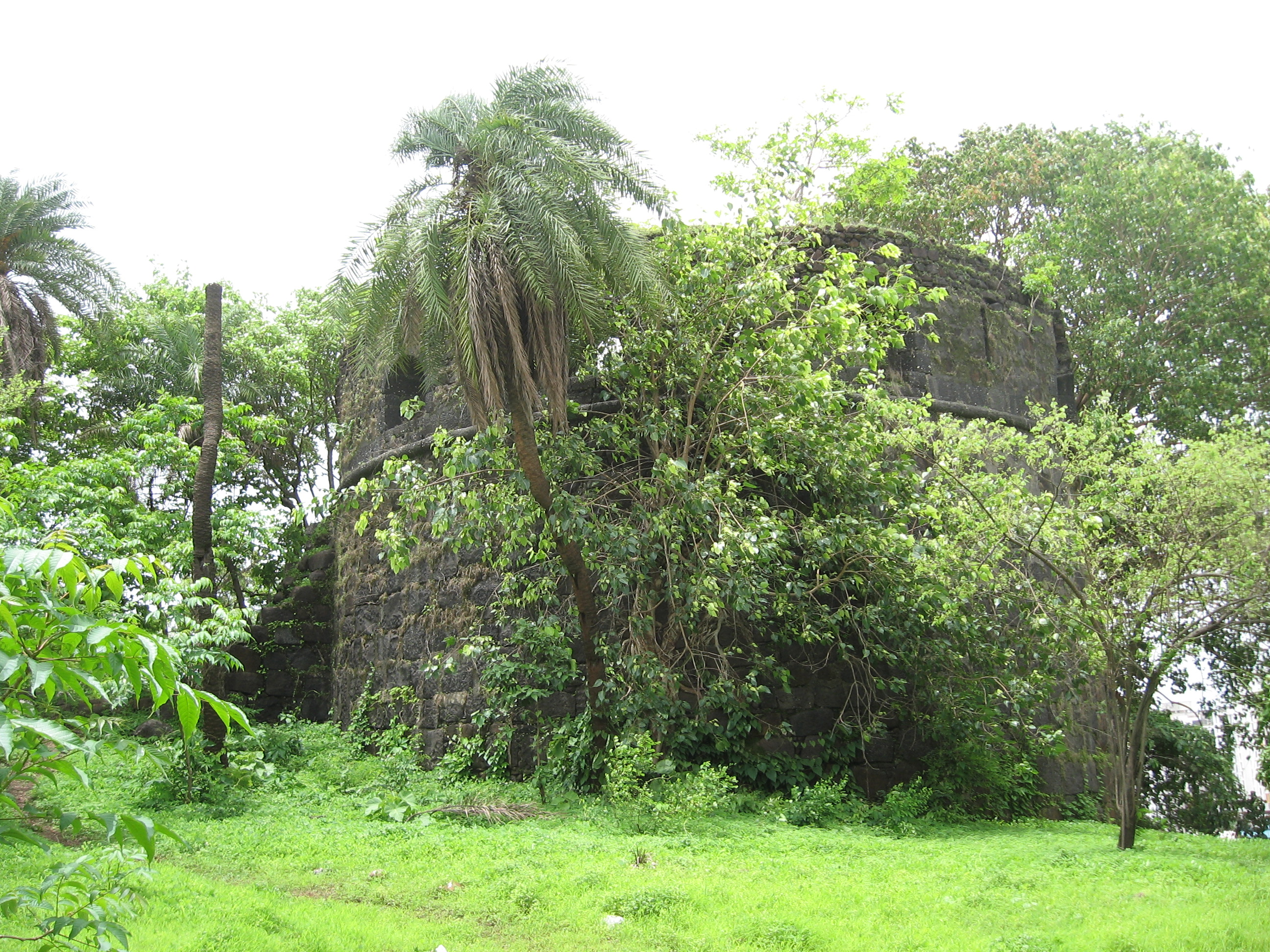
- Belapur Fort as seen from its base

Site information
- Type: Hill Fort; Land battery
- Owner: Siddi Dynasty (before 1682); Portuguese Empire (1682–1734); Maratha Kingdom (1734–1817); East India Company (1817–1947); Government of India (1947- Present)
- Open to the public: No
- Condition: Dilapidated

Location
- Coordinates: 19.005524°N 73.028403°E

Site history
- Built: 1570; 456 years ago
- Architect: Shazada Wal jah bahadur
- Materials: Basalt and Lime mortar
- Demolished: Partially demolished in 1817; 209 years ago

Belapur Fort is a fort near the township of Belapur in Navi Mumbai, Maharashtra, India. The fort was built by the Siddhis of Janjira. It was later conquered by the Portuguese, and then Marathas. In the early 19th century, the fort was captured by the British. After the British gained supremacy in the region, with the expansion of the Bombay Presidency, the strategic importance of the fort declined, and it fell into disuse.

== History ==
Built by the Siddhi dynasty in the Navi Mumbai region, it is located atop a hillock, near the mouth of the Panvel Creek. In 1682, the fort was formerly annexed by the Portuguese, who had managed to defeat a revolt in the regions controlled by the Patkar family, the parganas "Cairena, Sabaio and Panchena", near Belapur (at that time known as Shabaz, Belaflor do Sabaio in Portuguese).

In 1737, the Marathas, led by Chimaji Appa, wrested control of the fort from the Portuguese. He had made a vow that if it were to be successfully recaptured from the Portuguese, he would place a garland of beli leaves in a nearby Amruthaishwar temple, and after the victory the fort was christened as Belapur Fort. The Marathas ruled the area until 23 June 1817, when it was captured by Captain Charles Gray of the British East India Company. The British partially destroyed the fort under their policy of razing any Maratha stronghold in the area.

During its active days, the fort stationed four companies each of 180 men, and 14 guns ranging from 4–12 pounds (2–5 kg) in weight. A tunnel is also supposed to exist, which many locals believe connects it to Gharapuri Island, the site of the Elephanta Caves.

== Restoration ==
The fort comes under the jurisdiction of City and Industrial Development Corporation (CIDCO). It lies in a dilapidated state. Plans are underway to renovate the fort which is in danger of being lost to encroachments. Residents have used the Right to Information Act to save the fort from dumping and debris. A pond in the vicinity that supplies water to the area is also in danger of being choked. There is no renovation or restoration as per the given reference as of January 2018.

== See also ==
- List of forts in Maharashtra
