= Ramrao Adik Institute of Technology =

Engineering college located in Navi Mumbai, India

- Type: Private
- Established: 1983
- Accreditation: NAAC Grade A
- Affiliations: D. Y. Patil Deemed to be University
- President: Dr. Vijay D. Patil
- Principal: Dr. Mukesh D. Patil
- Students: 4000
- Undergraduates: 900 as of 2019
- Location: Navi Mumbai, Maharashtra, India; 19°02′35″N 73°01′31″E
- Campus: 5.0-acre (2.0 ha), Urban
- Website: Official website

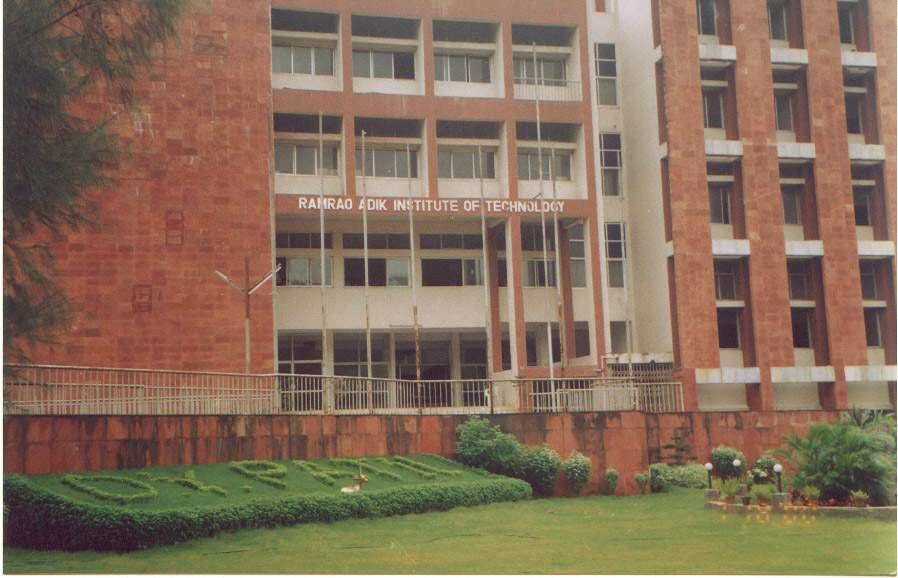
Ramrao Adik Institute of Technology

Ramrao Adik Institute of Technology (RAIT) is a private engineering college located in Nerul, Navi Mumbai, India. It was established in the year 1983. The institute is recognized by the All India Council for Technical Education (AICTE). Since 2020–21, the institute under the ambit of D. Y. Patil Deemed to be University, Navi Mumbai. The Computer Engineering, Electronics Engineering, and Electronics and Telecommunications departments have been accredited by the National Board of Accreditation (NBA).

== Campus ==
RAIT is located in the campus of Dr. D. Y. Patil Vidyapeeth University, Nerul. The 72-acre (29 ha) campus houses the Dr. D. Y. Patil Medical College, Dr. D. Y. Patil Dental College and Hospital, the Institute of Hotel Management and Catering Technology, the Colleges of Law, Architecture, Occupational and Physiotherapy, and the Ayurveda College and Hospital. RAIT occupies 2.7 acres (1.1 ha) of the total area. The infrastructure and facilities include libraries, air-conditioned classrooms, medical rooms, playground, and gymnasium.

== Academics ==
RAIT offers various courses in engineering, technology, and sciences both in undergraduate and postgraduate levels. It also offers PhD programs for research in computer science and electronics.

=== Undergraduate programs ===
RAIT offers a bachelor's degree in nine areas that include:

- Computer Engineering
- Electronics and Computer Engineering
- Computer Science and Engineering (Cybersecurity)
- Computer Science and Engineering (AIML)
- Artificial Intelligence and Data Science
- Computer Science and Business Systems
- Information Technology
- Electronics and Telecommunication Engineering
- Electrical and Instrumentation Engineering

=== Postgraduate programs ===
RAIT offers a master's degree in five areas that include:

- Computer Engineering (Data Science)
- Computer Science (AI)
- Information Technology
- Computer Engineering
- Instrumentation Engineering

=== Research programs ===
The research (PhD) programs offered are:

- Electronics Engineering
- Computer Engineering
- Electronics and Telecommunication Engineering
- Instrumentation Engineering
- Information Technology

University and college rankings

Engineering – India
- NIRF (2023): 151-200

== Extra curricular activities ==
RAIT arranges many extra curricular activities. Technical Festival is held twice a year by all the technical committees and open to people outside the college. Cultural Festival called "Horizon" is arranged every year in the months of March (For the first time Culture Festival got cancelled in the year 2020 due to COVID-19 Pandemic), which is one of the best Cultural Festival in all over Mumbai and Navi Mumbai. It is a three-day cultural festival which has various events like Live concerts, Fashion shows, EDM concerts, and various entertainment games. Passes are available for people outside not attending the college.

RAIT hosts a charity run called Udaan every year during February or March. It is open to all. Its distance is between 6 and 7 km. The event witnesses huge response from people. The event saw participation of few thousands in the year 2020.

The college also arranges many events for its students like Stamina (Sports event), Cultural days, Teacher's days, etc. RAIT also provides a platform to develop performing arts, literary, and fine arts by encouraging students to participate in various competitions as well organize several state level and national level events.

== Notable alumni ==
- Shankar Mahadevan, composer and playback singer

== See also ==
- DY Patil Stadium
- List of schools in Maharashtra
