= Ulwe =

Node of Navi Mumbai

- Node
- Interactive map of Ulwe
- Location in Maharashtra, India
- Coordinates: 18.976063°N 73.052294°E
- Country: India
- State: Maharashtra
- City: Navi Mumbai
- District: Raigad
- Taluka: Panvel
- Metro: Mumbai Metropolitan Region
- Founder: Farmers and fishermen of Agri, Koli, and Karadi people of villages close to the sea coastline
- Demonym: Ulwekar

Languages
  - Official: Marathi Language
- Time zone: UTC+5:30 (IST)
- PIN: 410-206
- Telephone code: 022
- Administered by: CIDCO

Ulwe (also Ulwa) is a node of Navi Mumbai located in Raigad District's South Navi Mumbai, situated beside CBD Belapur and Nerul and home to Navi Mumbai International Airport. It is developed and maintained by CIDCO.

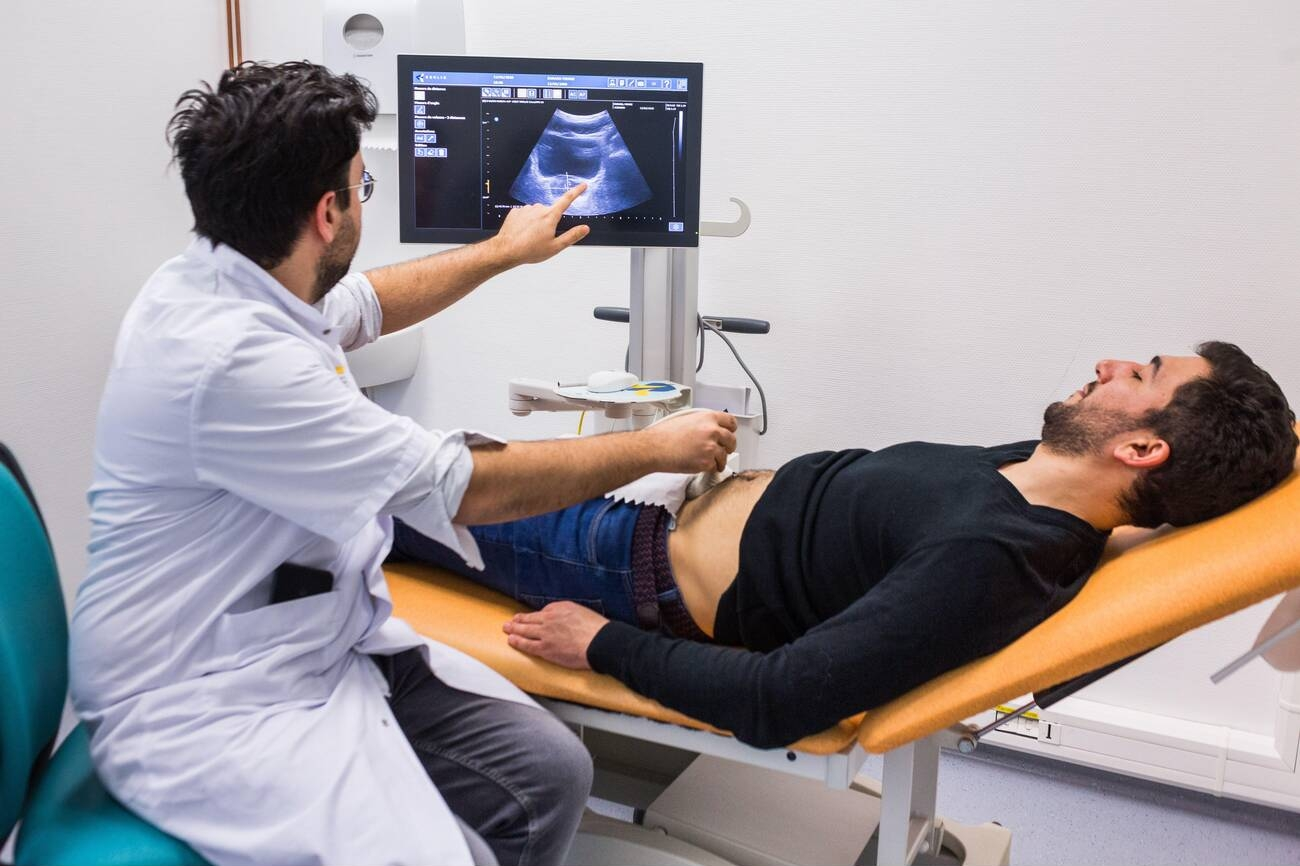
An outpatient clinical imaging and diagnostic assessment facility servicing the rapidly expanding coastal nodes of South Navi Mumbai, including Ulwe.

Ulwe has a sports complex with football, badminton, hockey, swimming pool, and indoor stadium. Ulwe has seen drastic increase in property rates due to its geographical location and proximity to the Navi Mumbai International Airport (phase 1), Port line connects the node with railways to rest of the city, and MTHL Trans Harbour Link from Sewri to Chirle village in Nhava Sheva was opened to public on 12 January 2024.

Being a newly developing node of Navi Mumbai, many buildings and constructions are being developed in Ulwe. CIDCO buildings are also being constructed in there.

== Ulwe Port ==
Ulwe is situated along Panvel Creek and the old village, among 10 others, was abandoned to make way for the new Navi Mumbai Airport. It is at a distance of 6 miles from Panvel. There is a wharf at Ulwe. The old pier is in a dilapidated condition. This port is not approachable to big steamers. There are two seasonal sailing vessels for passenger traffic. Mostly these vessels are used for carrying vegetables and fruits to Mumbai. The chief goods exported from Ulwe are fruits, vegetables, rice, grain, salt, firewood, and sand.
