= Bokadvira =

Village in Raigad district

Bokadvira बोकडवीरा Navin Sheva
- Village
- View of the Bokadvira village
- Interactive map of Bokadvira
- Country: India
- State: Maharashtra
- Region: Konkan region
- District: Raigad

Government
  - Type: Grampanchayat
  - Body: Bokadvira

Bokadvira (Marathi: बोकडवीरा) also known as Navin Sheva is a village in the Raigad district of Maharashtra in India. It is located near the Dronagiri Railway Station. It is situated in the area of Uran Taluka. It is connected by Uran-Panvel road. The village holds a police chowki called Bokadvira Police Chowki. It is close to the Jawaharlal Nehru Port (JNPT) near Navi Mumbai.

Shree Ganesh Mandir at Bokadvira village.

The Patils are the dominant community in the village of Bokadvira. The mother tongue of the village is Marathi. Presently the village comes under the broader region of the Navi Mumbai development projects in the Mumbai Metropolitan region of Maharashtra. The village is locally governed by the Grampanchayat of Bokadvira.

== Demographics ==
According to the Indian population census 2011, the total population of the village is 2810. Out of the total population, 1492 are males and 1318 are females. There are total 679 number of households in the village.

Among the total population, 2191 are literate people, while 619 people are illiterate.

== History ==
During the British rule in 1826, the village of Bokadvira was granted for reclamation of salt wastes. In 1984, the people of nearby village named Sheva gaon were displaced from their village for construction of the Jawahar Lal Nehru Port. The farmers of the village were given the village of Bokadvira.

The farmers were promised compensation for the loss of their land, livelihoods, and way of life.
