= Dronagiri Fort =

- Navi Mumbai, Raigad district, Maharashtra
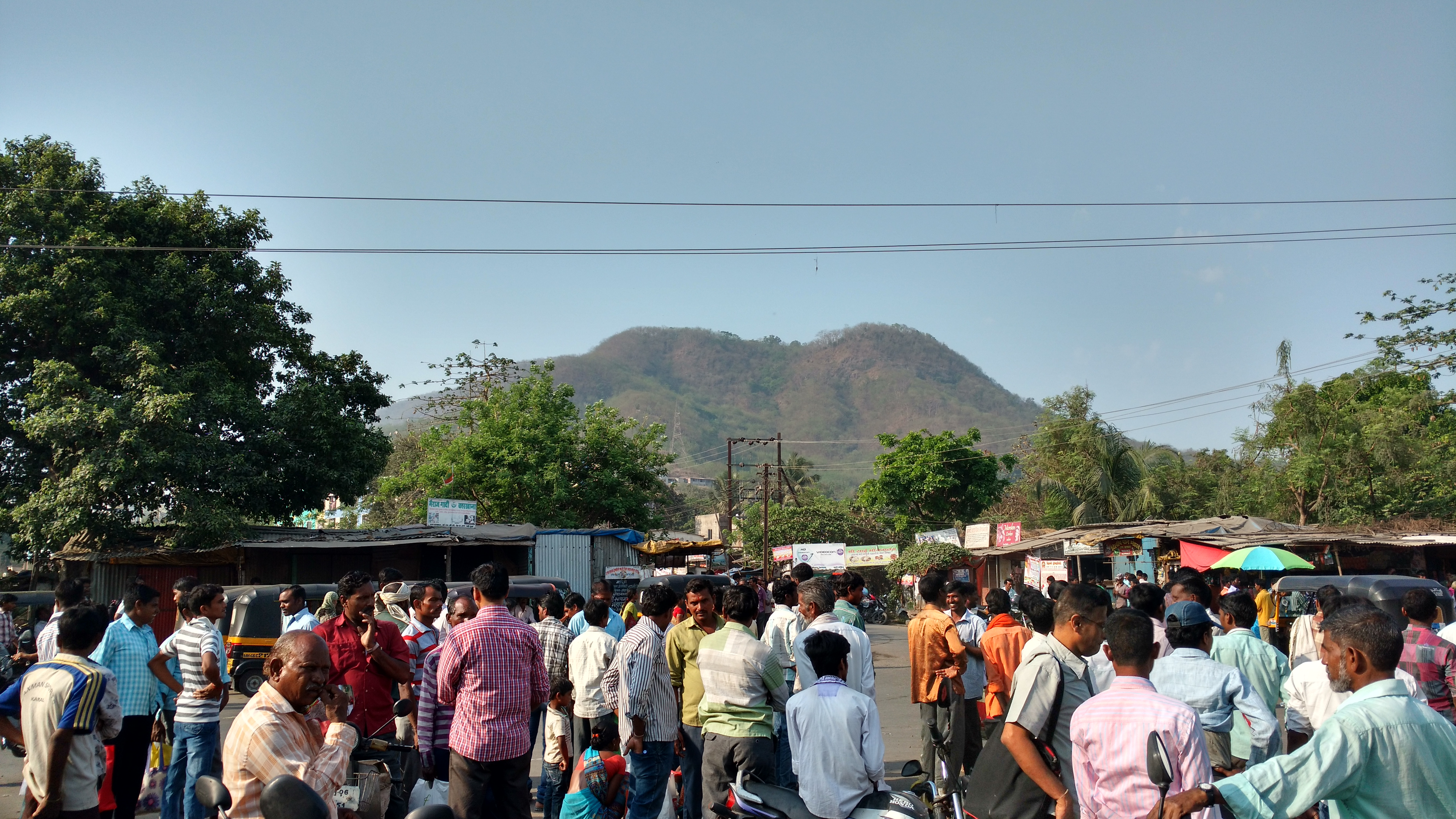
- Fort seen from Uran square

Site information
- Type: Hill fort
- Owner: Government of India
- Open to the public: Yes
- Condition: Ruins

Location
- Shown within Maharashtra
- Location within Maharashtra
- Location of Dronagiri Fort within Navi Mumbai
- Coordinates: 18°52′01″N 72°56′09.3″E

Site history
- Built: Unknown
- Materials: Stone
- Demolished: 1818

Dronagiri Fort is a fort in Navi Mumbai's Raigad district, Maharashtra, India.

== Introduction ==
The fort is situated on the top of the hill which is close to Uran town in Raigad district. The fort is accessible in all seasons. The trek to the fort is simple and safe. Being close to Uran and Karanja, the fort was strategic importance since old times. The entire hill is densely covered with forest.

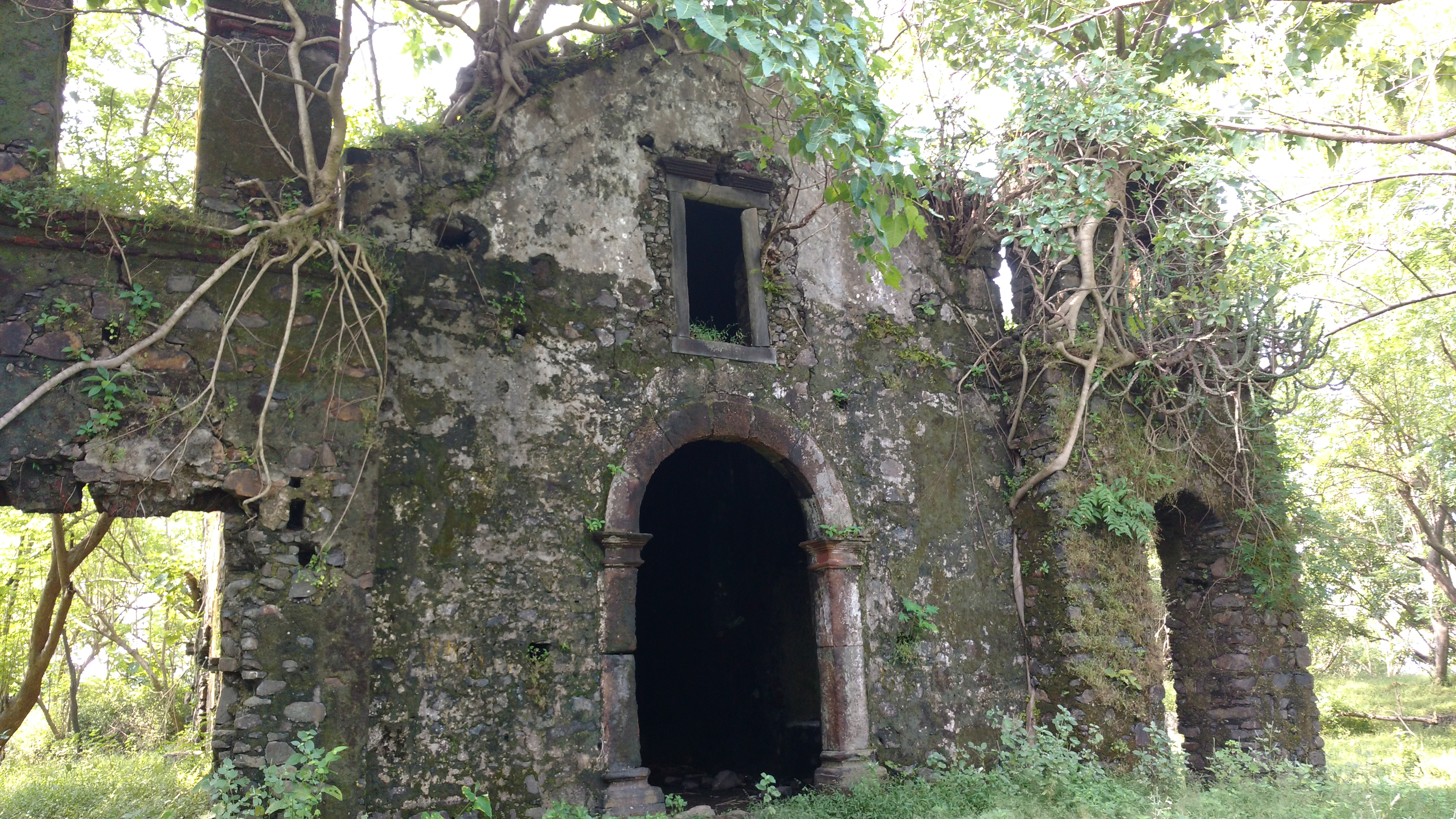
The church on the fort

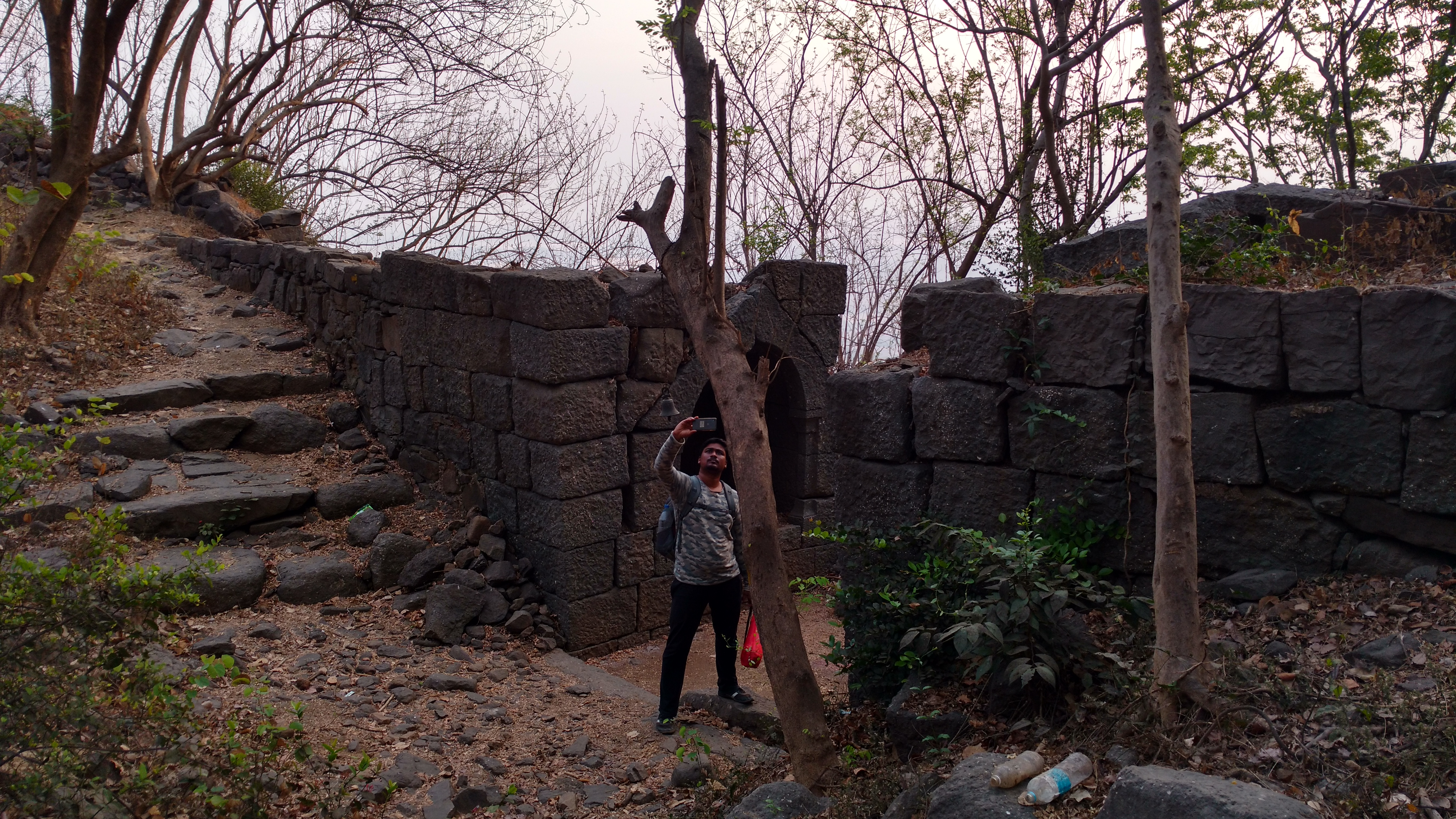
The main gate fort

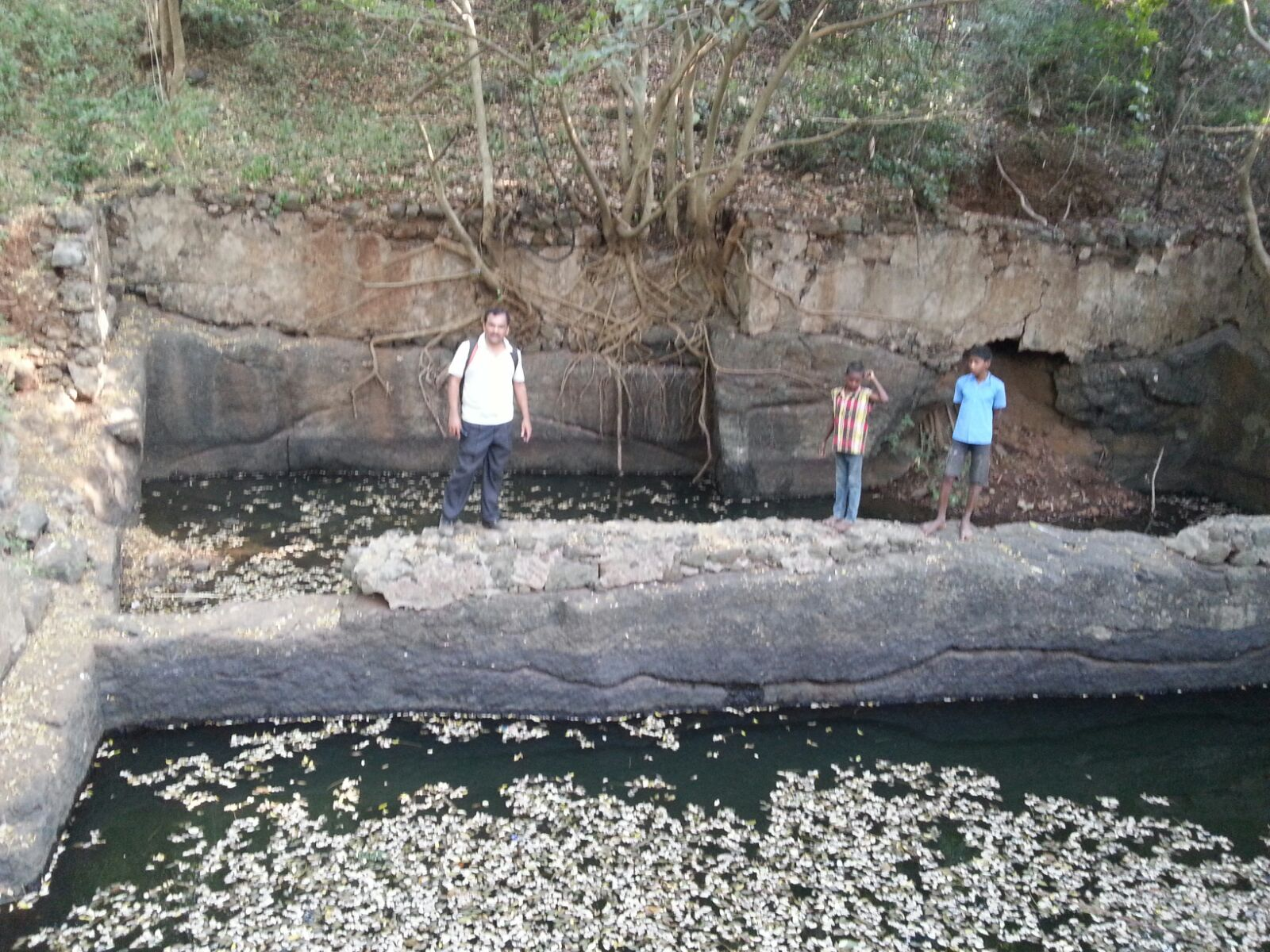
Water tank on the fort

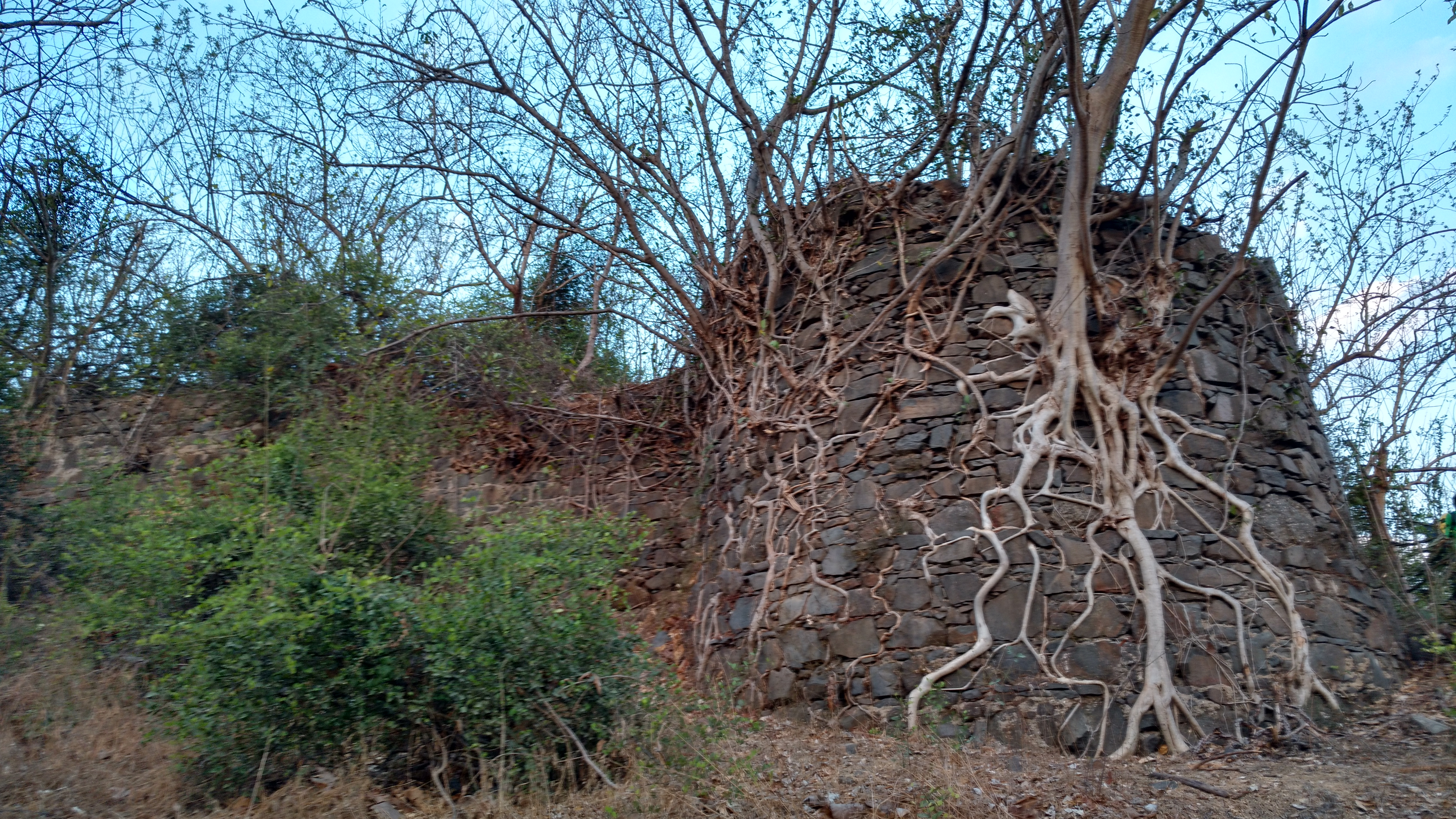
Bastion on the fort

== History ==
The fort was under the rule of Yadav of Devgiri. In 1530, the fort was repaired by the Portuguese. In 1535, the father Antono-de-porto constructed three churches Nosa senhora, N.S.Da Penha and Sam Francisco. In the 16th century the fort was captured by Adilshah and was in his control for some period. Finally it passed to the hand of British. On 10 March 1739, the fort was captured by Manaji Angre along with the Uran (Daurnagar) fort.

== Places to see ==
The ruins of the fortification are seen on the fort. There is a church Nossa Senhora da Penha in good condition, but without any idol or inscription. There are two water tanks "Gagoni and Gijoni" near the church. The church is in the inner fortification. The main gate to the fort is situated on the south of the church 50 m away. The arch of the gate is broken, yet the guards rooms are in good condition. The Ganpati carved on the key stone is placed in one of the guard room. From the main gate a path way leads south to the Village Karanja. In between a Vetal mandir in ruined state is located. The pathway starting from the back of the Vetal mandie leads to large water tank in good condition situated among the forest. The ONGC plant is well overlooked from the fort, however photography of the plant is not allowed.

== How to reach ==
The path to the Dronagiri fort starts from the Uran Bus stand. The narrow road in front of the Bus stand leads to Daur Nagar. After passing through the tribal hutments in Daur nagar a lone path leads to the fort. The path is a gradually climbing northern detour around the hill. The entire path passes through dense forest of Gliricidia sepium or Mexican Lilac trees planted by Forest department. There is a Police Chowki near the Church on the fort. Night halt on the fort is restricted.
