= Navi Mumbai =

City in Maharashtra, India

Navi Mumbai Navī Muṁbaī (Marathi) New Bombay
- City
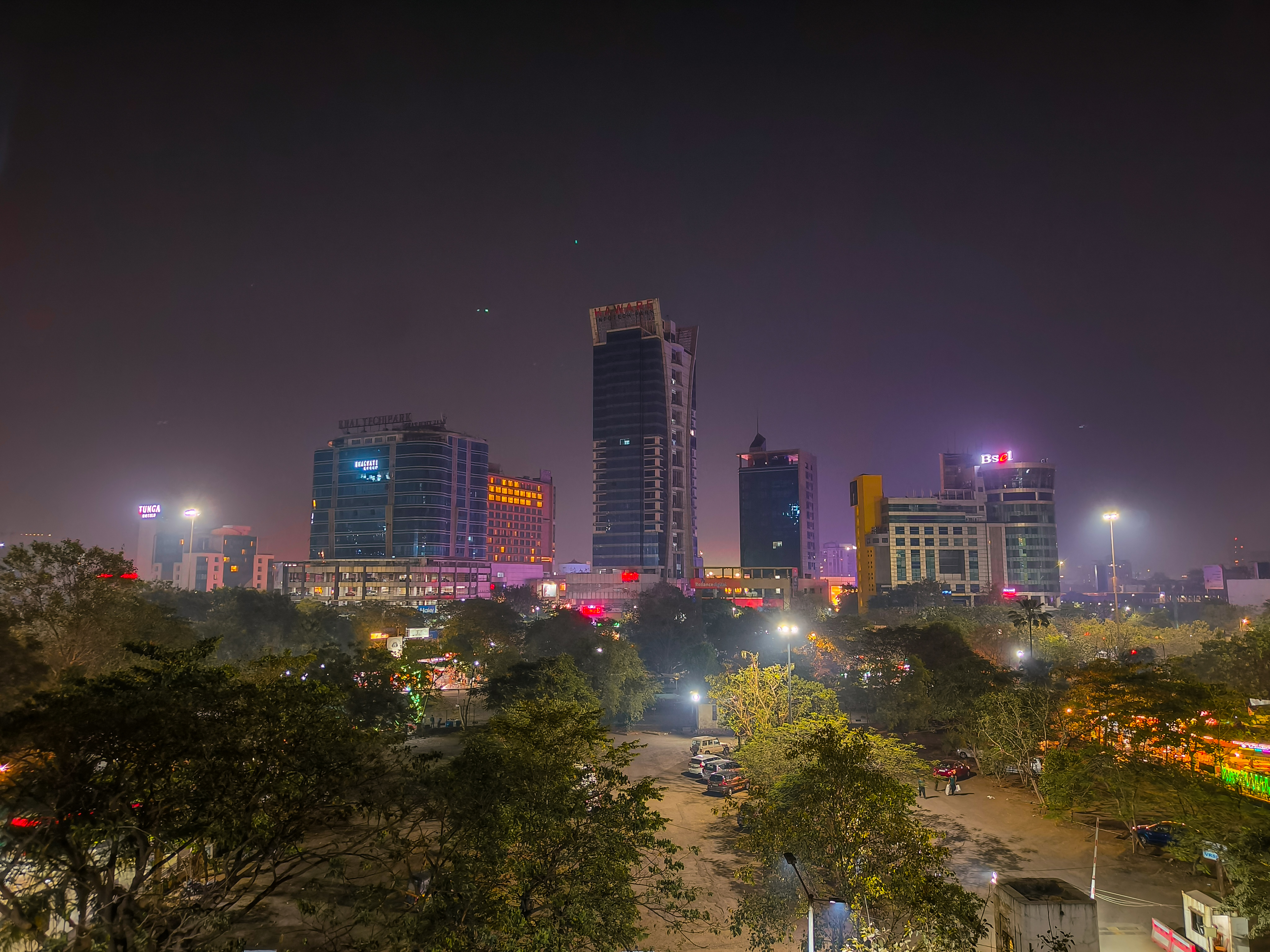
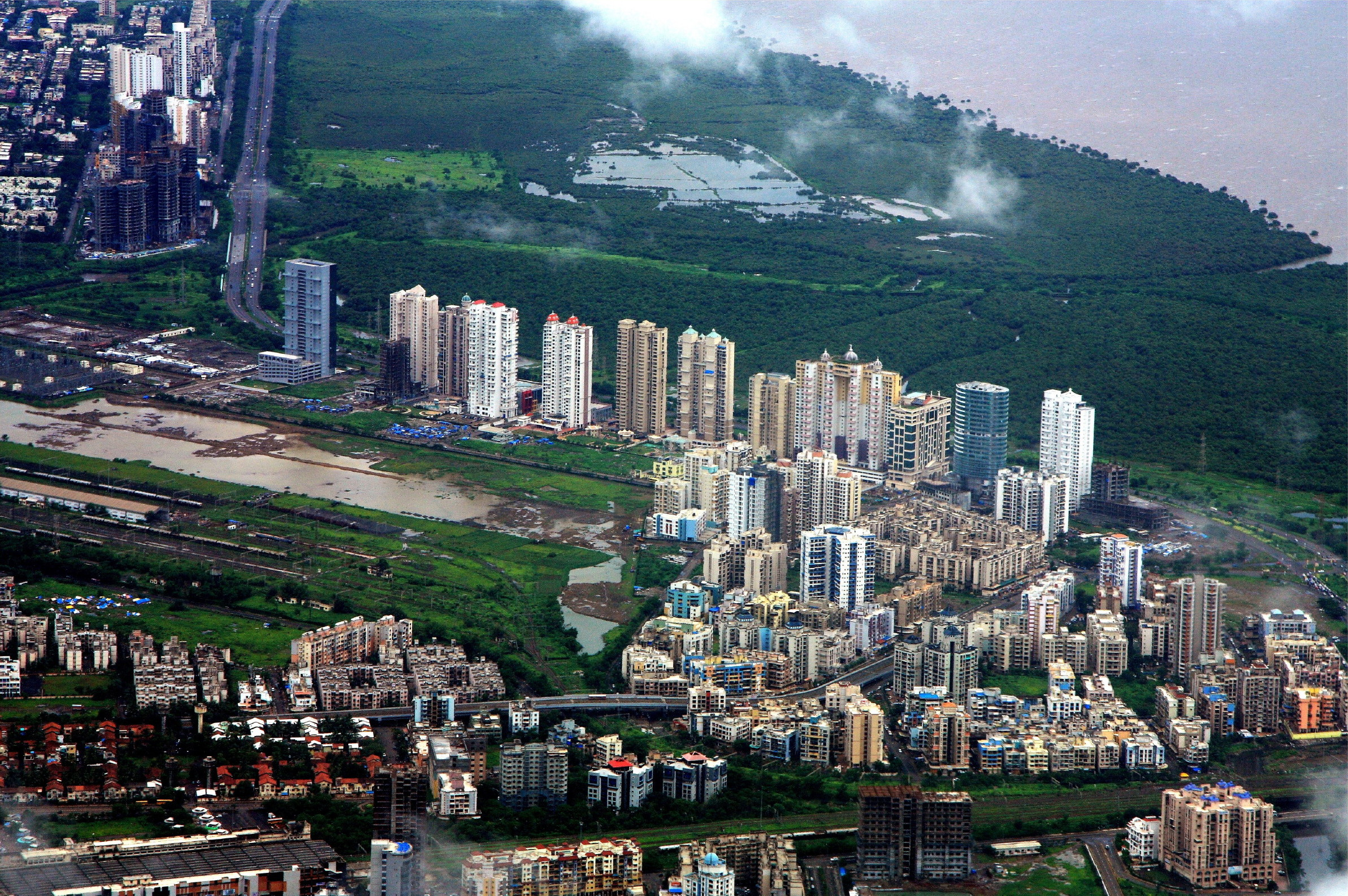
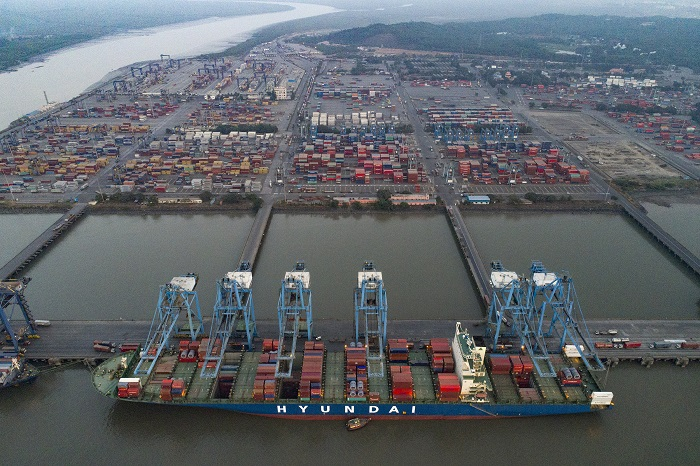
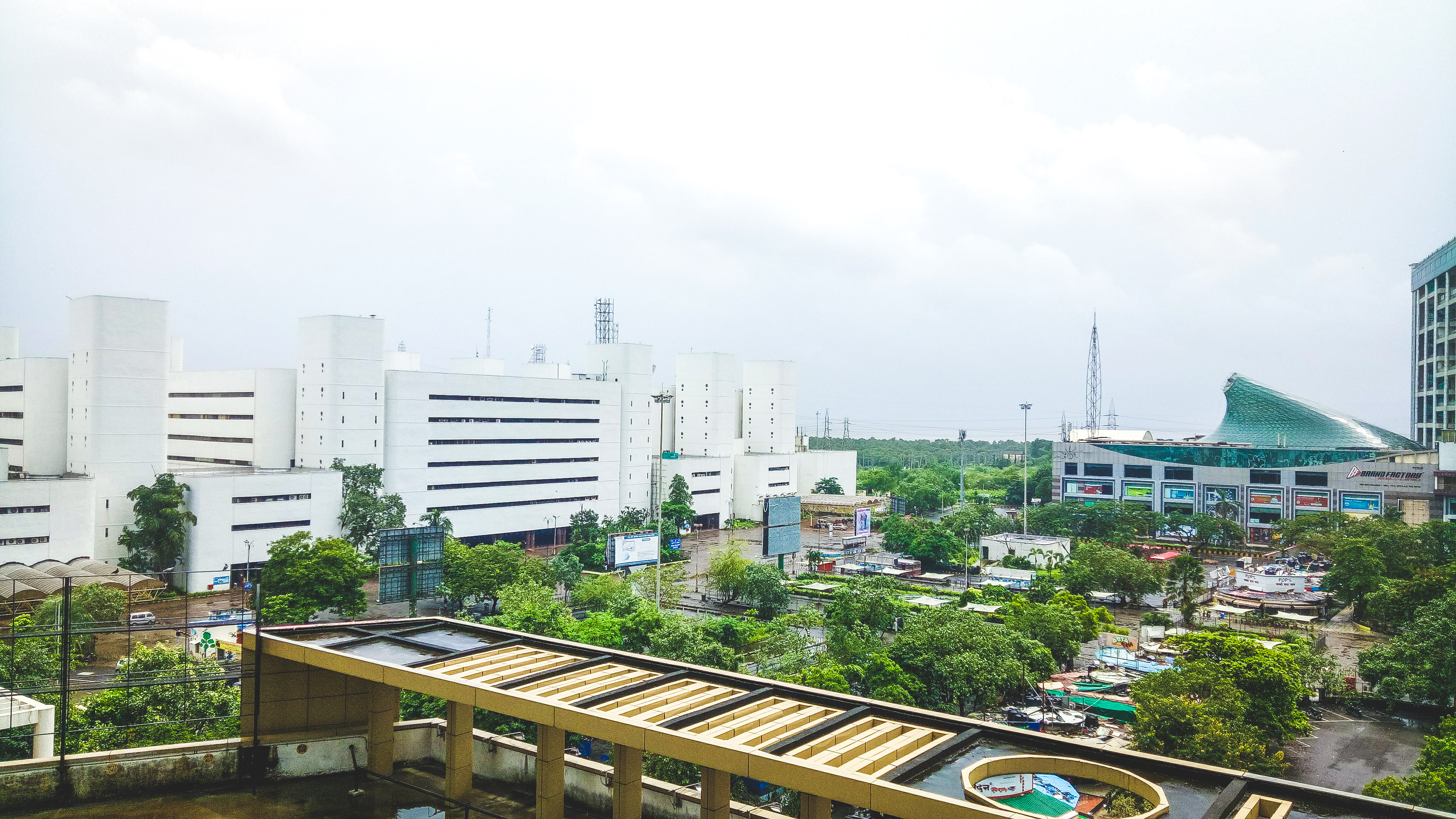
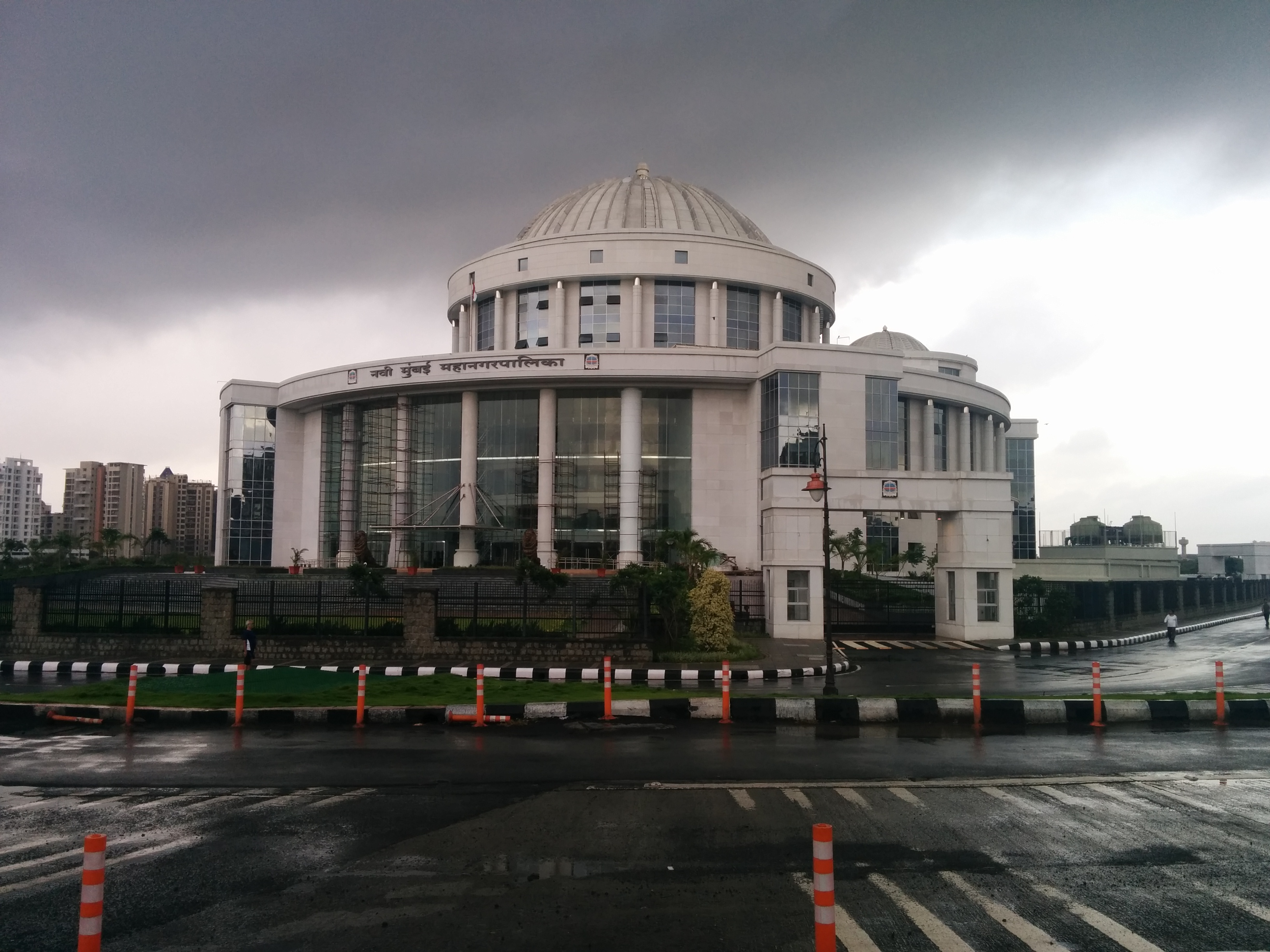
- Vashi skyline Dronagiri Skyline Palm Beach Road Jawaharlal Nehru Port Vashi railway station NMMC headquarter
- Nickname: Flamingo City
- Location of Navi Mumbai

- Location within Maharashtra Location within India
- Country: India
- State: Maharashtra
- Division: Konkan
- District: Thane district; Raigad district
- Planned and Developed by: City and Industrial Development Corporation

Government
  - Type: Municipal Corporation; Urban planning agency
  - Body: Navi Mumbai Municipal Corporation 109.59 Km²(Thane district); Panvel Municipal Corporation 110.06 Km² (Raigad district); CIDCO 124.05 Km² (Raigad district)

Area
  - Total: 343.70 km^{2} (132.70 sq mi)
- Elevation: 14 m (46 ft)

Population
  - Total: 1,618,000
  - Density: 4,700/km^{2} (12,000/sq mi)
- Demonym: Navi Mumbaikar
- Time zone: UTC+5:30 (IST)
- Vehicle registration: MH-43 (Thane district); MH-46 (Raigad district)
- International Airport: Navi Mumbai International Airport
- Transit: Rapid Transit: Navi Mumbai Metro; Commuter rail: Mumbai Suburban Railway

Navi Mumbai (Marathi: [nəʋiː mumbəi]; also known as New Bombay, its official name until 1995) is a city in the Mumbai Metropolitan Region, located in the Konkan division of the Western Indian state of Maharashtra. Navi Mumbai is situated on the Indian mainland, opposite Salsette Island and the city of Mumbai, and is part of Thane district (North) and Raigad district (South), respectively

The area within the Navi Mumbai Municipal Corporation has been ranked third among 73 cities surveyed for cleanliness and hygiene by the Union Ministry of Urban Development and the Quality Council of India as part of Swachh Bharat Abhiyan, and is being modified through various projects and developments. Navi Mumbai has, for two consecutive years (2022 and 2023), held on to the third rank in the Indian Commonwealth Cleanliness Survey (Swachh Survekshan) — a nationwide sanitation survey of cities — while Mumbai's ranking slipped to 37 in 2023 from 31 in 2022.

Navi Mumbai is home to various educational institutions. Several multinational corporations have their head offices or branches across the city, making it an active business hub. Airoli, Thane–Belapur Road, Vashi, Nerul MIDC, Seawoods,CBD Belapur and Palm Beach Road are major business attractions and upmarket residential areas, respectively. Navi Mumbai is emerging as a data center powerhouse of India.

== History ==
In the late 1500s, the Siddis of Janjira built the Belapur Killa, located atop a small hill near the mouth of the Panvel Creek. In 1682, the fort was captured by the Portuguese, who had managed to annex the regions controlled by the Siddis.

In 1733, the Marathas, led by Chimaji Appa, wrested control of the fort from the Portuguese. Appa had made a vow that if it were to be successfully recaptured from the Portuguese, he would place a garland of beli leaves in the nearby Amruthaishwar temple, and after the victory, the fort was christened as Belapur Fort. The Marathas ruled the area until 23 June 1817, when it was captured by Captain Charles Gray of the British East India Company. The British partially destroyed the fort under their policy of razing any Maratha stronghold in the area.

Navi Mumbai’s journey began in the early 1970s, when the Maharashtra government recognized the need for an alternative urban area to relieve the growing pressure on Mumbai, which was then struggling with issues like overcrowding, inadequate housing, and strained infrastructure.

== Planning and development ==
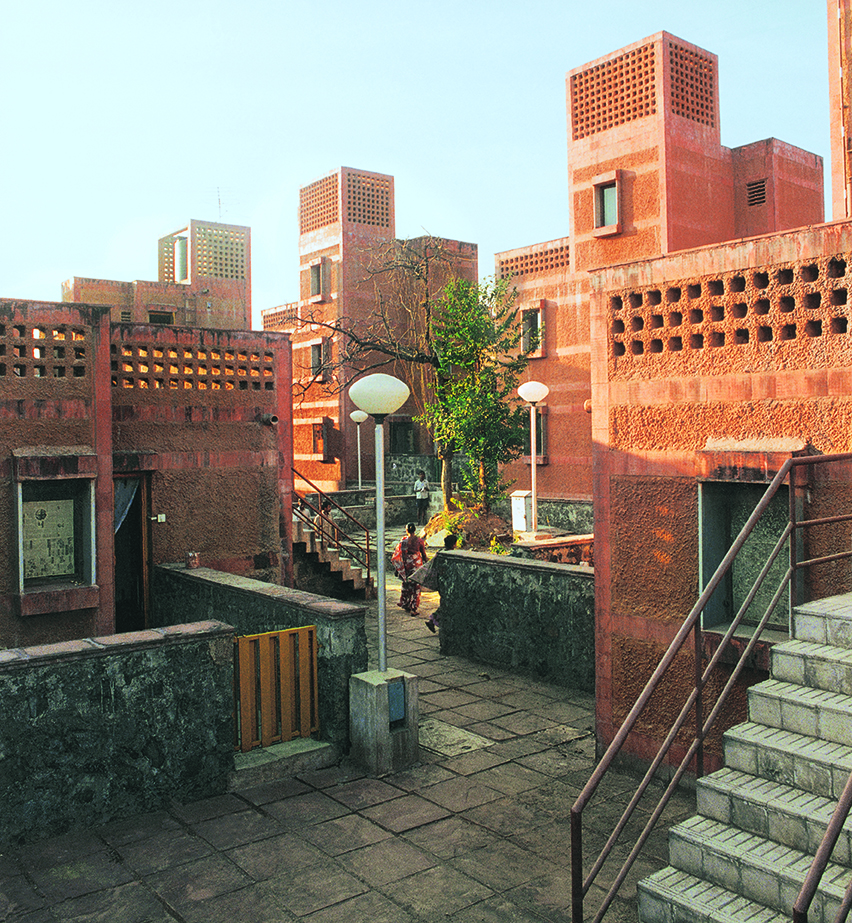
Low Income housing facilities in Navi Mumbai

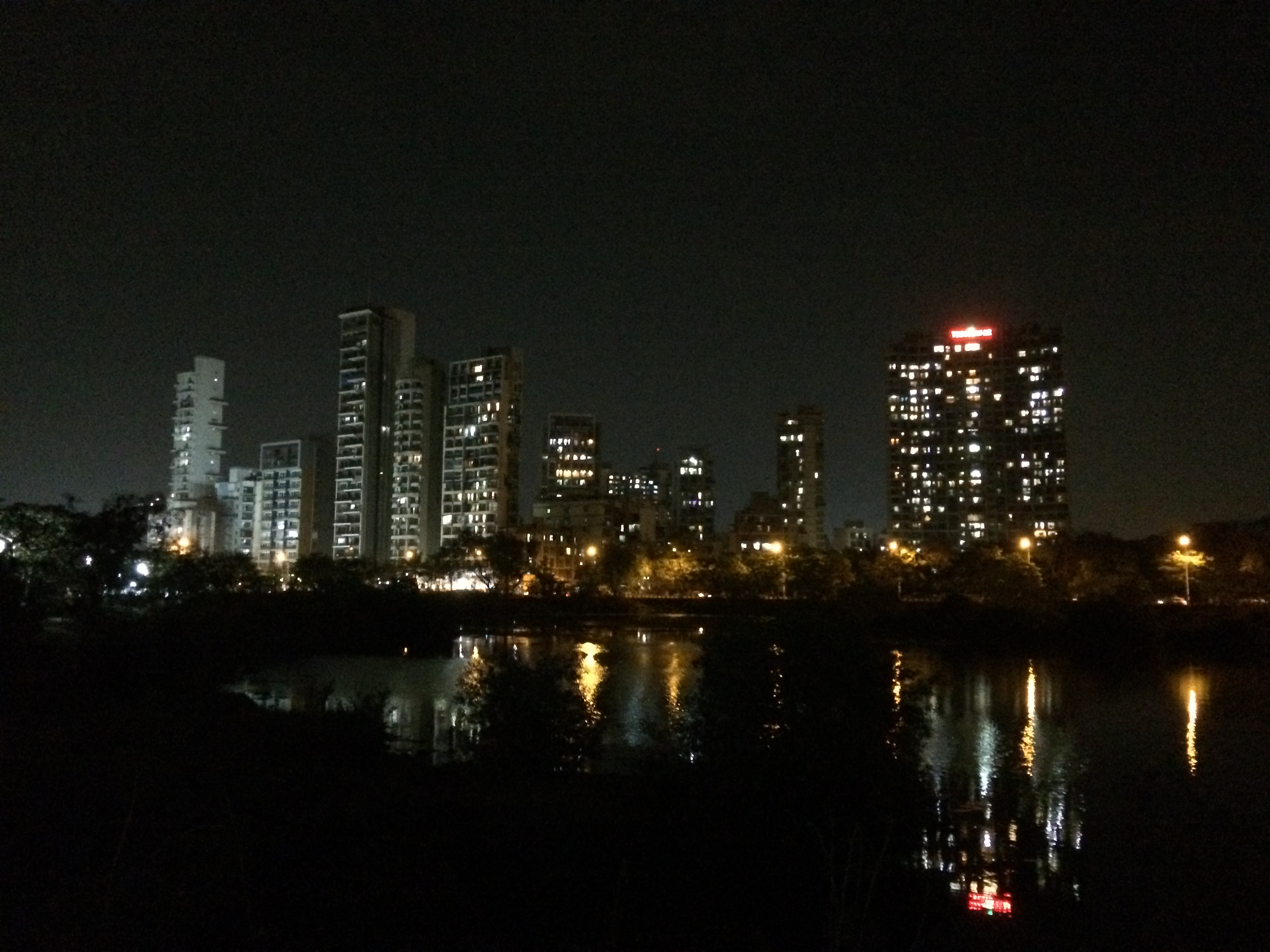
Skyline of Nerul, Navi Mumbai

The population of Greater Mumbai doubled from three to nearly six million between 1951 and 1971. The population growth led to a deteriorating quality of life for many in the city.

The Maharashtra Regional and Town Planning Act was passed in 1966, and the Mumbai Metropolitan Region was created in June 1967 and finalized in 1970. The plan called for development, of a twin city across the harbour, on the mainland to the east.

Before Navi Mumbai was made, railway was linked to Panvel railway station with Diva Junction railway station in 1964, in 1966 it was extended to Apta via Rasayani, then in the 1980s to Roha and in phases was linked to the Konkan Railway by 1998, in 1990s Harbour line of Mumbai Suburban Railway reached Navi Mumbai connecting Vashi, Nerul.

The Board recommended that the new metro-centre or Navi Mumbai as it is now called, be developed to accommodate a population of 2.1 million.

The planning of Navi Mumbai began in 1971 and involved leading architects and urban planners including Adi Kanga, Charles Correa, Shirish Patel, Pravina Mehta and R. K. Jha. The City and Industrial Development Corporation (CIDCO) was created as part of these efforts.

The area covered 150 kilometres (93 mi) of the Konkan coast. Privately owned land consisting of 86 villages covering within the present limits of Navi Mumbai were acquired by the government of Maharashtra. Navi Mumbai covers the southern part of Thane taluka (from Thane District) and part of Panvel and Uran talukas (from Raigad District).

CIDCO developed 13 Nodes of the city in North and South parts which were divided into villages, sectors and plots to facilitate comprehensive development. The nodes in the North are Airoli, Ghansoli, Kopar Khairane, Vashi, Turbhe, Sanpada, Juinagar, Nerul, Seawoods, CBD Belapur, in the South Ulwe, Dronagiri and Uran. Sanpada is the smallest node of Navi Mumbai at 8.6 km^{2}.

CIDCO planned and constructed railway stations, roads, and public spaces in Navi Mumbai and developed nearby areas commercially. In 1973, the Vashi bridge was opened to the public for residents of Vashi, CBD Belapur and Nerul. The Sion Panvel Highway was built to reduce the time taken to travel from Sion to Panvel. Major changes took place only after 1990, with the commissioning of a wholesale agricultural produce market at Turbhe and the construction of a commuter railway line from Mankhurd to Vashi in May 1992. These developments caused a sudden growth in economic activities and population in Navi Mumbai.

The city originally planned to create affordable housing for people who could not afford living in Mumbai, with planners intent on preventing the growth of slums in the city. However, according to the 2001 census, a fifth to a third of the population of municipalized Navi Mumbai live in slums and gaothans (urban villages), with thousands of buildings violating planning norms.

By the end of the 1990s, the planning authority of Navi Mumbai sought to attract private developers to the city. A new rail link (Port line)between Nerul and Uran was opened on 11 November 2018.

South Navi Mumbai is developing rapidly in the modern nodes of Ulwe and Dronagiri, infrastructural developments due to their proximity to the Navi Mumbai International Airport (Phase 1) started operations on 25th December 2025.

Navi Mumbai has, been ranked 5th best “National Clean Air City” in India.

== Flora and fauna ==
Seawoods Flamingo Refuge in Seawoods Sector 58

A significant percentage of flamingos that settle in the Greater Mumbai Region are found in Navi Mumbai. Navi Mumbai also contains a stretch of mangroves.

== Administration ==
=== CIDCO ===
The City and Industrial Development Corporation (CIDCO) was responsible for maintenance, tax collection, and development of the city since its inception in the 1970s.

CIDCO planned 14 Nodes for the city. The seven Nodes in the North were Airoli node, Ghansoli node, Kopar Khairane node, Vashi node, Sanpada node, Nerul node and Belapur node. The Nodes in the South Navi Mumbai are Ulwe node and Dronagiri node. Later, municipal body were incorporated, Navi Mumbai Municipal Corporation (NMMC) in the North and cidco developing in South. Each Node is sub divided into village, sectors and plot.

CIDCO initially developed areas like Juhu Nagar (Vashi), Nerul, and CBD Belapur with homes, schools, and roads. Later, due to a growing population with the railway extension in the 1990s, CIDCO shifted focus to Kharghar, Kamothe, New Panvel and Kopar Khairane. Private builders played a large role in developing these areas. CIDCO, as of 2015, administers newer Nodes in South Navi Mumbai.

Skyline across Palm Beach Road

=== Navi Mumbai Municipal Corporation ===
On 17 December 1991, Navi Mumbai Municipal Corporation (NMMC) was constituted by the state government for maintaining some of the developed nodes of Navi Mumbai.

Local self-government started on 1 January 1992. NMMC was handed seven of the 14 nodes of the Navi Mumbai project area for its jurisdiction. However, CIDCO, as a planning authority, has rights on the open plots in these seven nodes.

The NMMC jurisdiction starts at Digha Gaon in the North and ends at Belapur in the South. The NMMC area is planned into seven nodes (zones) - Belapur, Nerul, Sanpada, Vashi, Kopar Khairane, Ghansoli and Airoli.

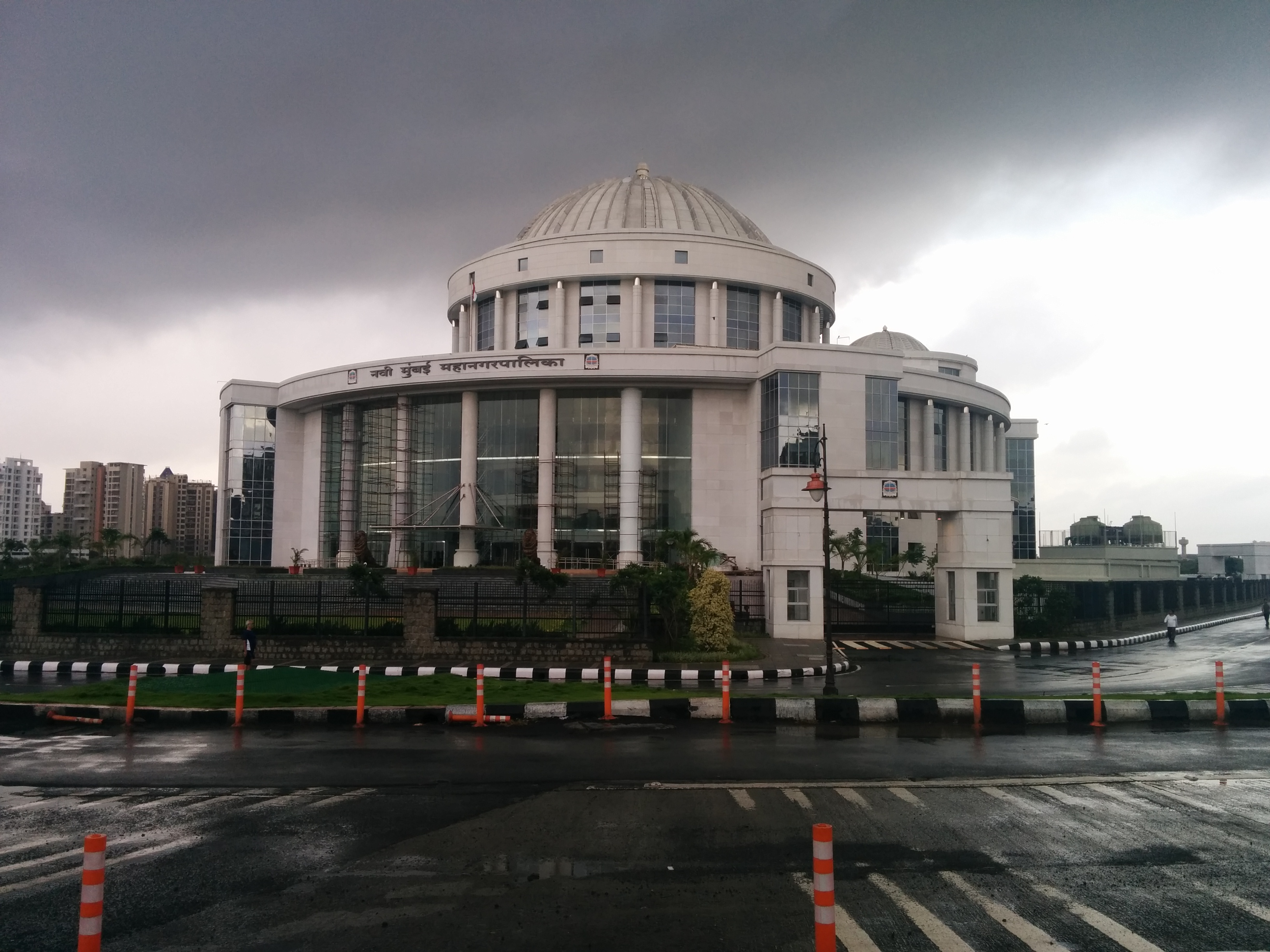
NMMC Main Building, CBD Belapur

Navi Mumbai Municipal Corporation is rated amongst the richest corporations in Maharashtra.

The Municipal Corporation is headed by a Municipal Commissioner and an elected Mayor.

Municipal finance

According to financial data published on the CityFinance Portal of the Ministry of Housing and Urban Affairs, the Navi Mumbai Municipal Corporation reported total revenue receipts of ₹2,497 crore (US$300 million) and total expenditure of ₹1,991 crore (US$240 million) in 2022–23. Tax revenue accounted for about 76.0% of the total revenue, while the corporation received ₹3 crore in grants during the financial year.

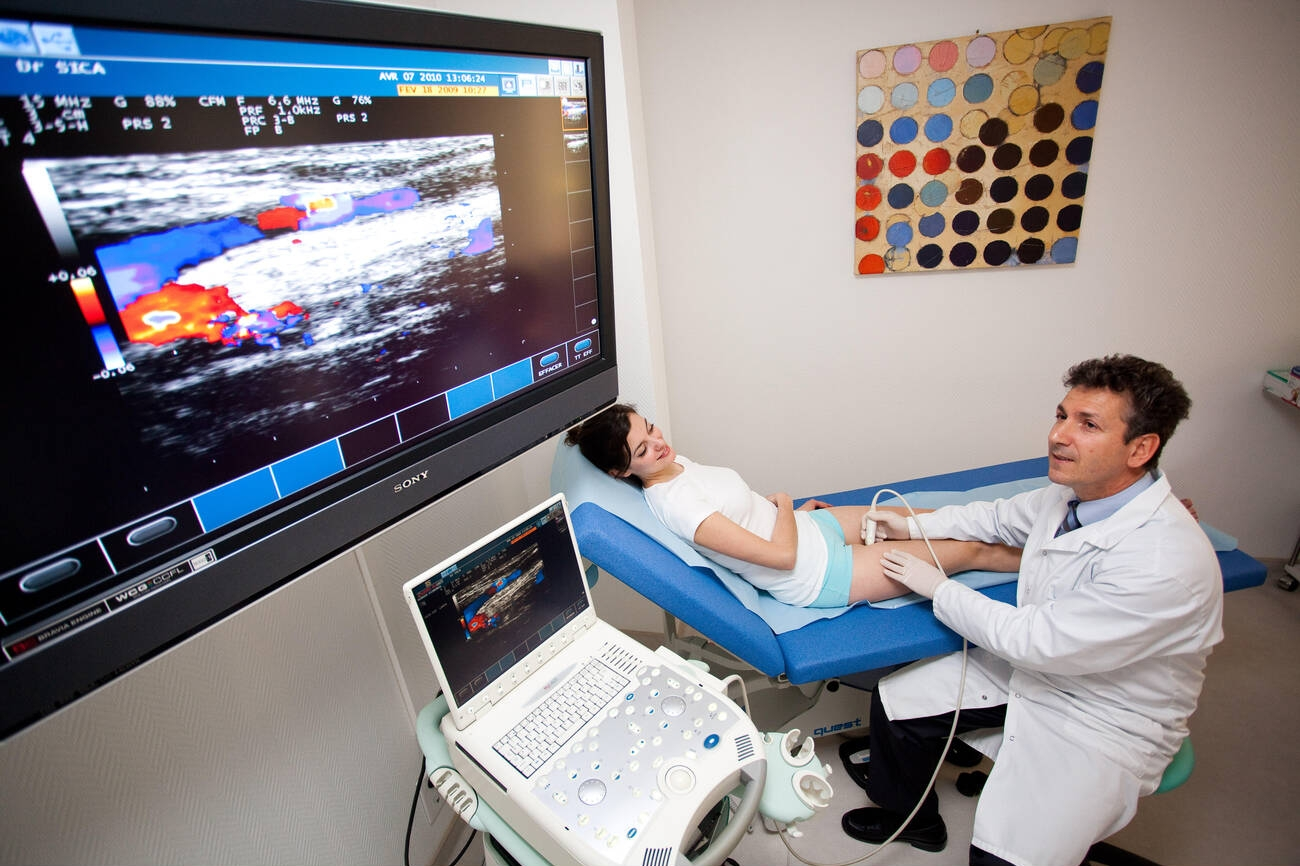
A vascular sonographer performing a lower extremity color Doppler ultrasound examination at a medical facility in Navi Mumbai, Maharashtra.

== Healthcare ==
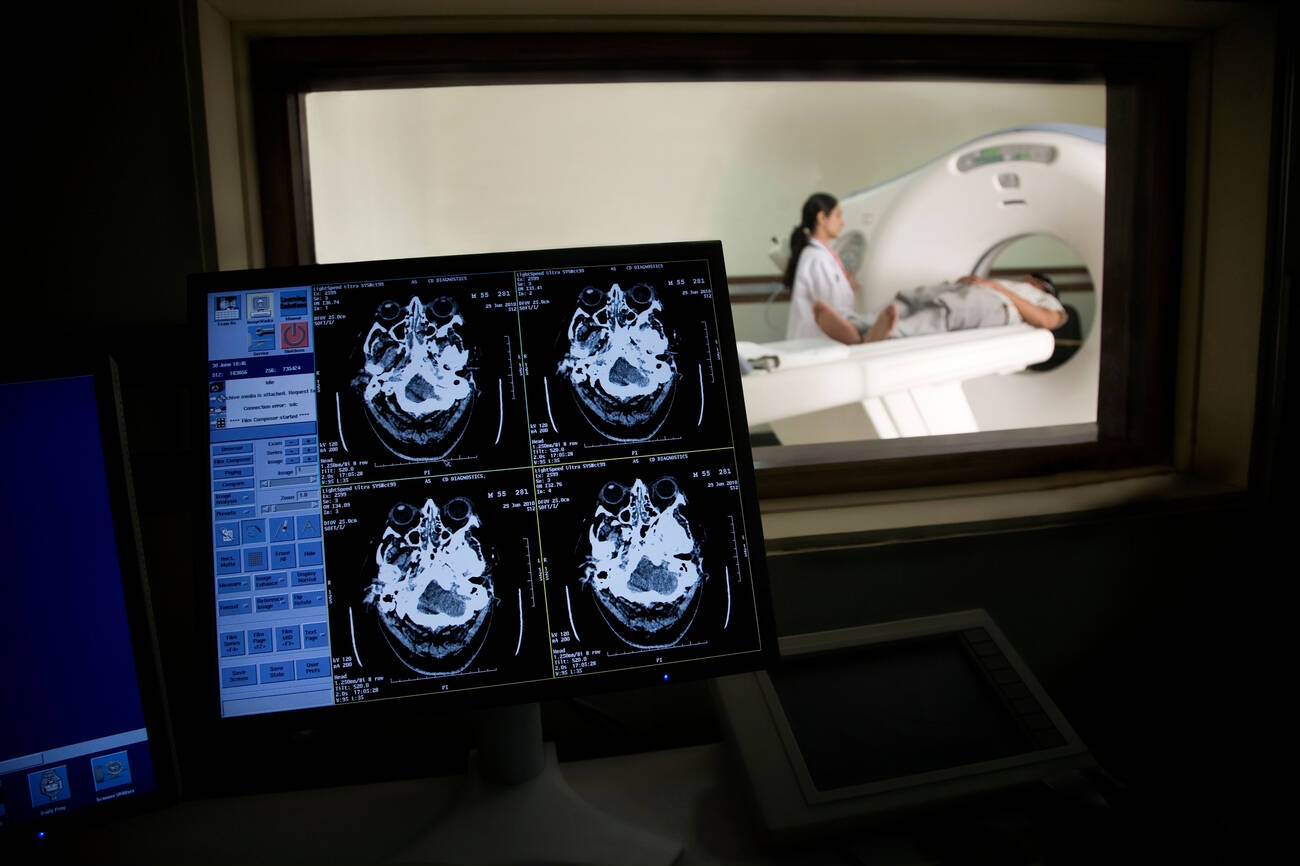
A modern medical imaging workstation monitoring a computed tomography (CT) brain scan, reflecting the advanced diagnostic and radiology infrastructure available across municipal and private healthcare networks in Navi Mumbai.

Navi Mumbai has evolved into a major medical hub within the Mumbai Metropolitan Region, supported by a mix of public municipal infrastructure and large private tertiary care networks. The public healthcare system, managed primarily by the Navi Mumbai Municipal Corporation (NMMC), underwent significant modernization to introduce advanced diagnostics—including MRI scanners, high-end ultrasound systems, and cardiac catheterization labs—directly into public civic hospitals in Vashi and Airoli to improve affordable care access.

The city also hosts several major multi-specialty tertiary institutions, such as the Kokilaben Dhirubhai Ambani Hospital in Kopar Khairane and UMC Hospitals in Nerul, which provide highly specialized advanced treatments like robotic surgeries, complex cardiology, and comprehensive radiology workflows. To establish the region as an international destination for medical tourism, the Government of Maharashtra signed a landmark $1.2 billion agreement to develop the 250-acre Navi Mumbai International MediCity near the new airport, anchored by global healthcare institutions to integrate advanced medical research, genomics, and AI-driven clinical treatments.

== Demographics ==
Religion in Navi Mumbai City (2011)
Religion	Percent
Hinduism	80.39%
Islam	8.68%
Buddhism	6.23%
Christianity	2.35%
Sikhism	1.01%
Jainism	0.99%
Other or not stated	0.36%

According to Census India, the population of Navi Mumbai in 2011 is 1,120,547, out of which males and females are 610,060 and 510,487 respectively. Meanwhile, its metropolitan population is 18,414,288, of which 9,894,088 are males and 8,520,200 are females. At least 60% of the population speaks the Marathi language.

Language in Navi Mumbai M. Corp (2011)
1. Marathi 61.66 (57.8%)
2. Hindi 23.21 (21.7%)
3. Gujarati 3.81 (3.57%)
4. Malayalam 2.58 (2.42%)
5. Urdu 2.46 (2.30%)
6. Bhojpuri 2.21 (2.07%)
7. Kannada 2.21 (2.07%)
8. Tamil 2.04 (1.91%)
9. Bengali 2.02 (1.89%)
10. Punjabi 1.67 (1.56%)
11. Telugu 1.64 (1.54%)
12. Marwari 1.24 (1.16%)

== Transport and infrastructure ==
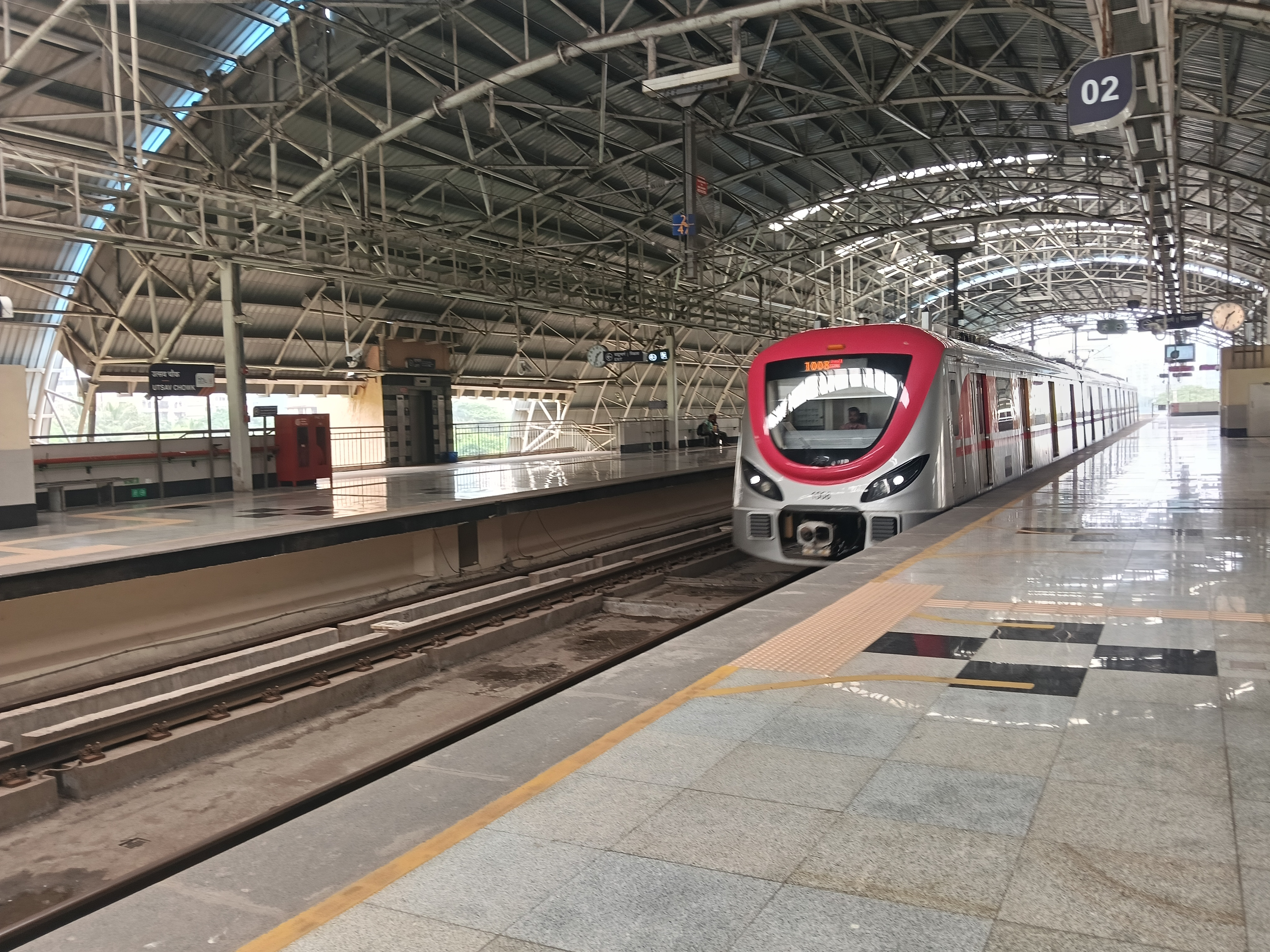
Navi Mumbai Metro

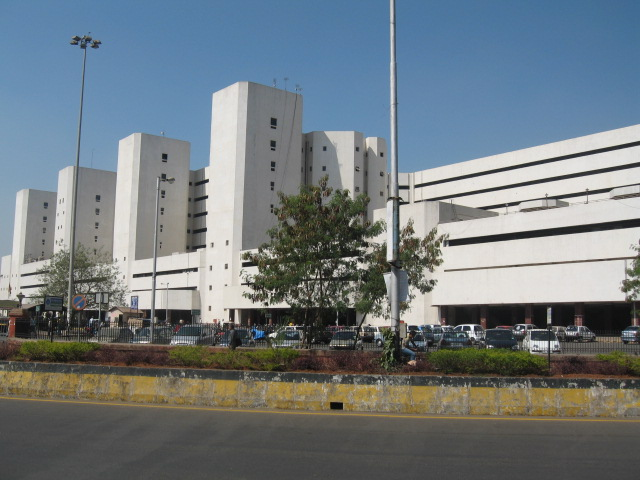
Belapur Railway Station

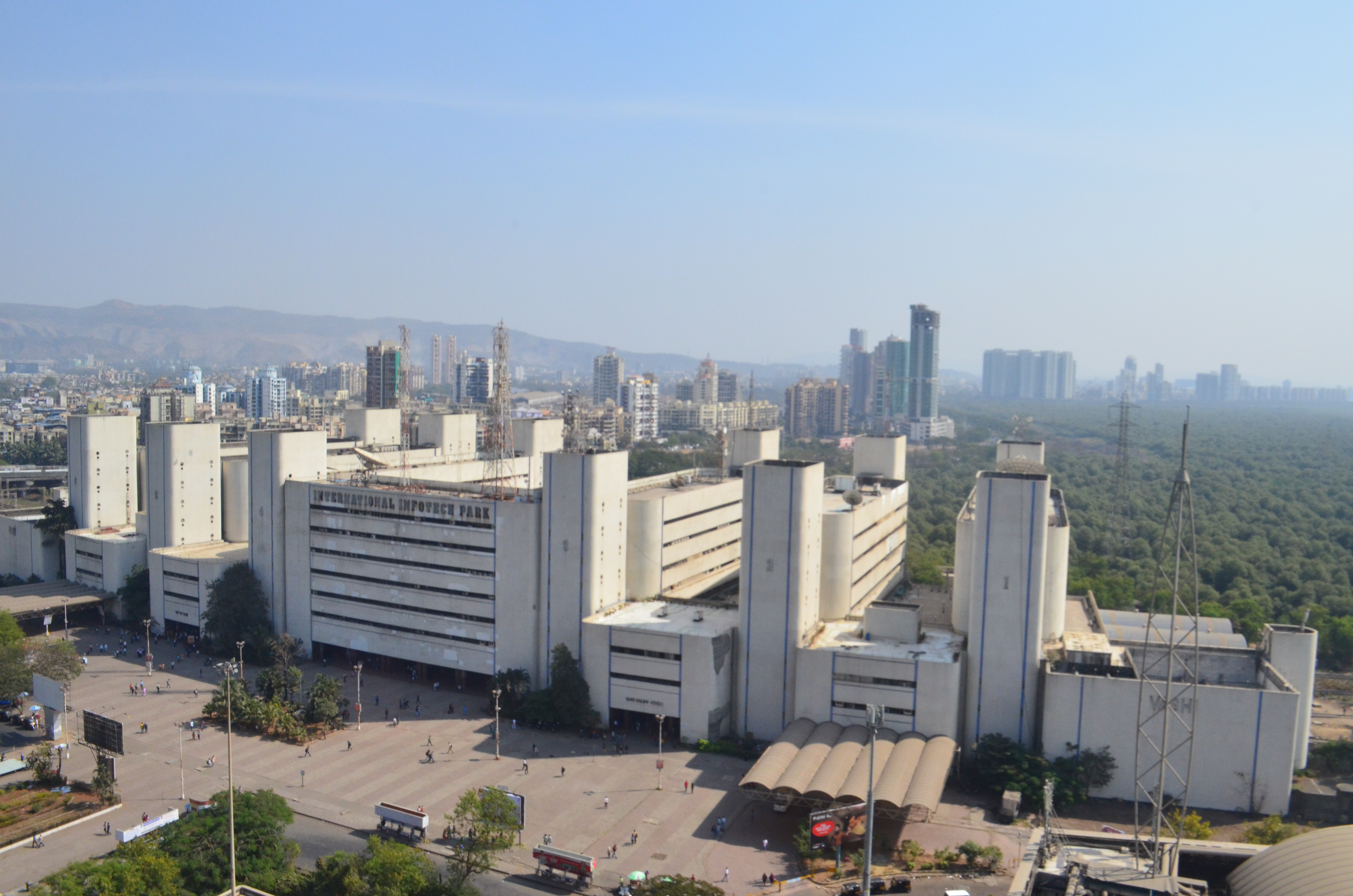
Vashi station complex

Navi Mumbai has a robust infrastructure, is well connected to other parts of the state and country and is less polluted compared to Mumbai. The city has a good public transportation system with NMMT, the transport wing of NMMC, serving bus commuters, the Mumbai suburban railway serving train commuters and a large fleet of auto rickshaws for intra-nodal commute. The Mumbai-Pune Expressway starts at Kalamboli in Panvel. The Mumbai Trans Harbour Link (MTHL), also known as the Sewri-Nhava Sheva Trans Harbour Link, is a 22-kilometre (14 mi) long freeway grade road bridge connecting South Mumbai with South Navi Mumbai. It opened on 12 January 2024, after Prime Minister Narendra Modi inaugurated the bridge.

The Mumbai suburban railway network covers most of the populated regions of the city. The most important suburban stations are Vashi, Nerul, Belapur and Panvel. The stations are planned as major railway junctions. Panvel is the only mainline station. All outstation trains halt here for time periods varying from five to 20 minutes. It is an important junction; railway lines come and meet here and it is connected to almost all parts of India. A new broad gauge line is functional between Karjat & Panvel.

Brihanmumbai Electric Supply and Transport (BEST) buses run from various area of Mumbai to Navi Mumbai & Navi Mumbai Municipal Transport (NMMT) buses run all over Navi Mumbai and various area in Mumbai, Thane, Bhiwandi, Kalyan-Dombivli-Badlapur, Panvel-Khopoli-Taloja, Uran-Ulwe etc. The Palm Beach Marg, a 10-kilometre (6.2 mi) long six lane road connects Vashi to CBD Belapur running parallel to the Thane Creek.

Auto rickshaws provide inter- and intra-nodal public transport across the city. Taxis operating from designated taxi stands provide the means to travel to further destinations. Taxis charge a fixed rate approved by the R. T. O., details of which can be found on popular local transit apps of the city.

Navi Mumbai has the second-largest container terminal in India after Mundra Port, Jawaharlal Nehru Port at Nhava Sheva in South Navi Mumbai. It is well connected by road and rail and handles approximately 56.13% of India's container traffic. The city will be served by the newly inaugurated Navi Mumbai International Airport.

=== Airports ===
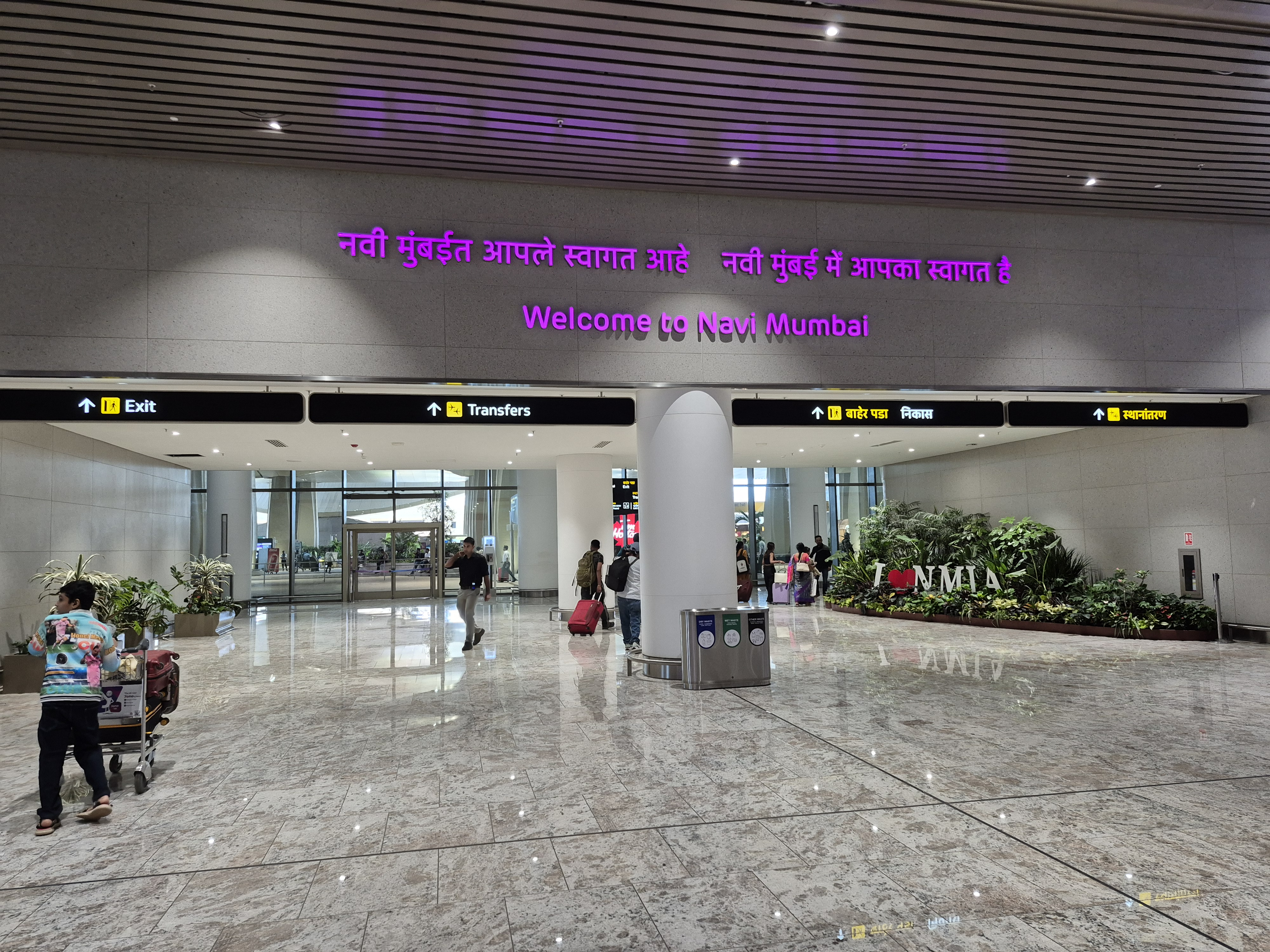
Navi Mumbai Airport

The Navi Mumbai International Airport is located near Ulwe. The ₹16,700 crore (US$1.8 billion) project was executed by Navi Mumbai International Airport Limited (NMIAL), a special-purpose vehicle formed by the Adani Airports Holdings Limited and CIDCO. It is being built in three phases. The first phase, now complete, features Terminal 1, designed to handle 20 million passengers annually. The foundation stone for the project was laid by Prime Minister Narendra Modi on 18 February 2018, and construction was started in August 2021. Phase 1 was inaugurated on 8 October 2025 by Prime Minister Narendra Modi, and flights commenced on 25 December 2025. NMIA is set to become the first airport in the country with multimodal connectivity through metro, rail and road. The airport will be connected to three roads: NH 4B (348), the Sion Panvel Highway and through MTHL. The railway connection will be through Targhar railway station, and metro connectivity will be via Mumbai Metro Line 8 (Gold Line) and the Navi Mumbai Metro Line 1. Another major airport serving Navi Mumbai is the Chatrapati Shivaji Maharaj International Airport in Mumbai, which is the main Airport with International connections around the world.

=== Metro ===
The Navi Mumbai Metro is a new rapid transit system serving the city. A network of as many as five lines has been planned, of which four lines will be constructed by CIDCO in the Navi Mumbai south region, while the second and third lines of the metro system will be constructed by NMMC and MMRDA, respectively. The first line of the metro system was completed by CIDCO and was opened to the public on 17 November 2023, after several delays spanning for around a decade due to various construction and land acquisition issues. This line includes three phases. In the first phase, the line joins the CBD Belapur station on the Mumbai suburban railway and Pendhar village. In the second phase, the line will join Taloja MIDC and Khandeshwar node (which will be extended to the newly inaugurated Navi Mumbai International Airport in Ulwe, and in the third phase, the line will link the Pendhar and Taloja MIDC metro stations. The cost of the metro project has risen from 4,163 crore for 21.45 km in 2011 to 8,904 crore for 26.26 km in 2018.

== Commerce ==
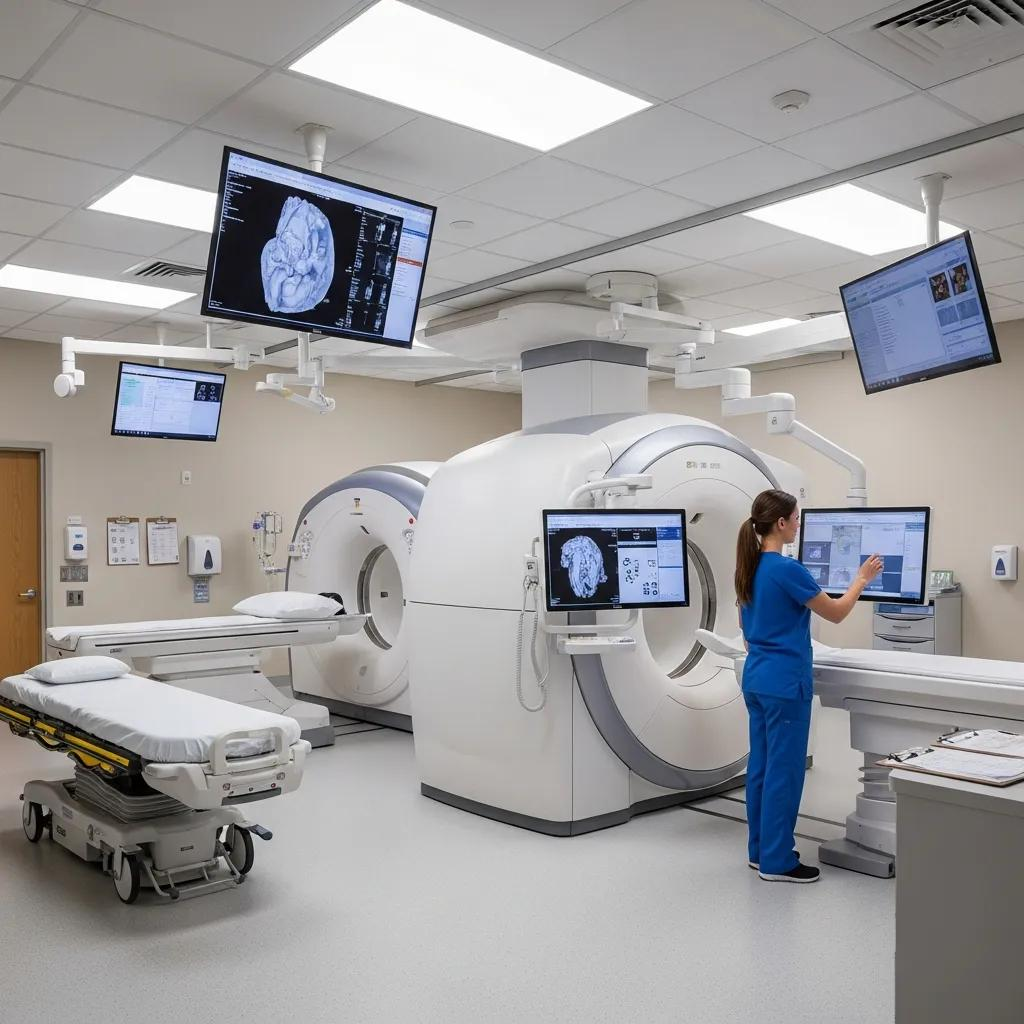
A modern diagnostic imaging and radiology facility, representing commercial healthcare infrastructure growth and advanced clinical research settings in Navi Mumbai.

The Navi Mumbai Special Economic Zone (SEZ), located in South Navi Mumbai Nodes of Dronagiri and Ulwe are planned to provide commercial growth and employment to the city. Positioned en route to the proposed Navi Mumbai Airport, this megaproject has attracted investments of close to 60,000 crores. Navi Mumbai is a new hub for newly incorporated companies & start ups to establish their base in Mumbai. The city holds a large agricultural products market called APMC Market in Vashi/Turbhe nodes.

== Sport ==
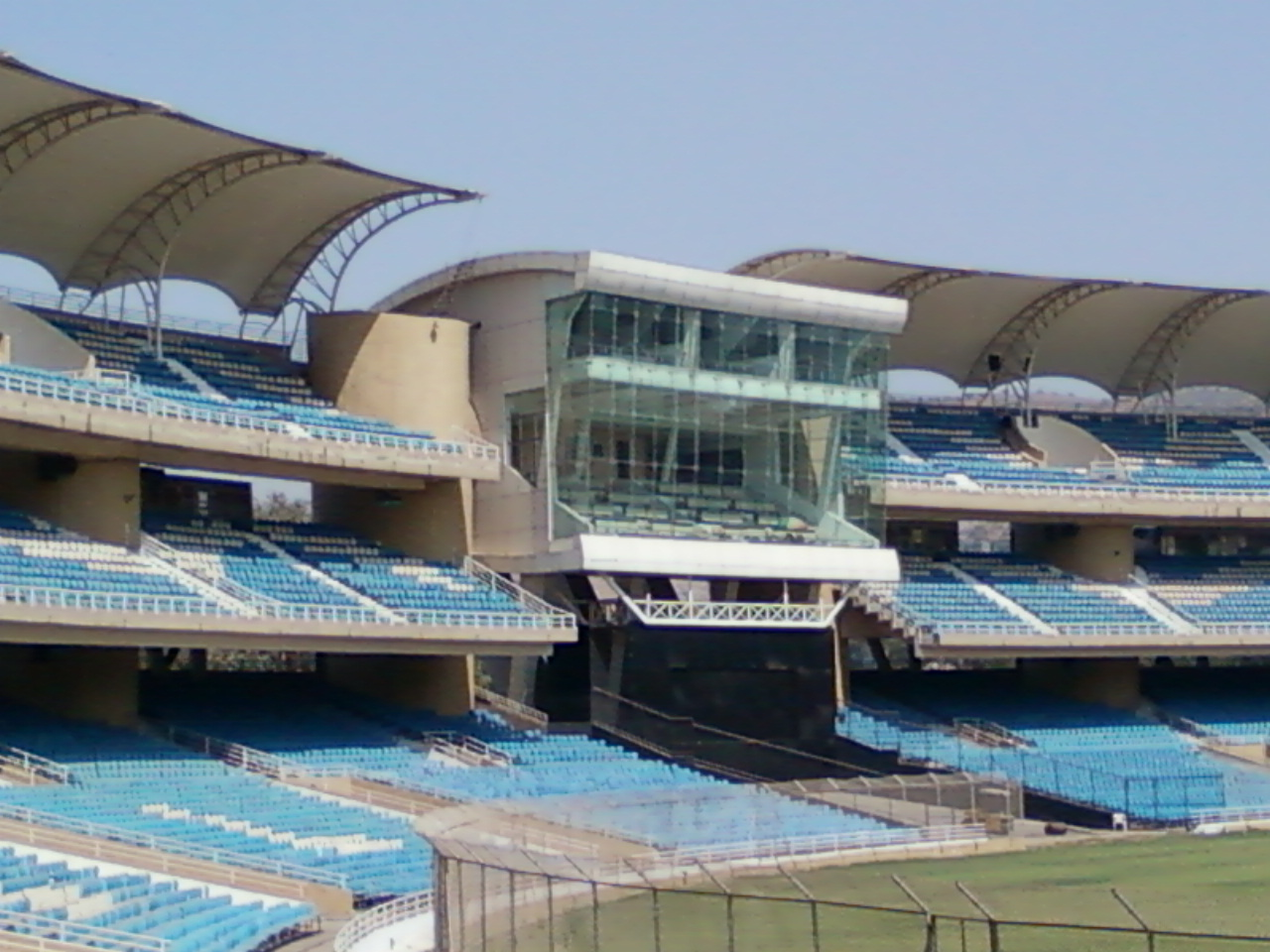
Cricket Stadium in Nerul

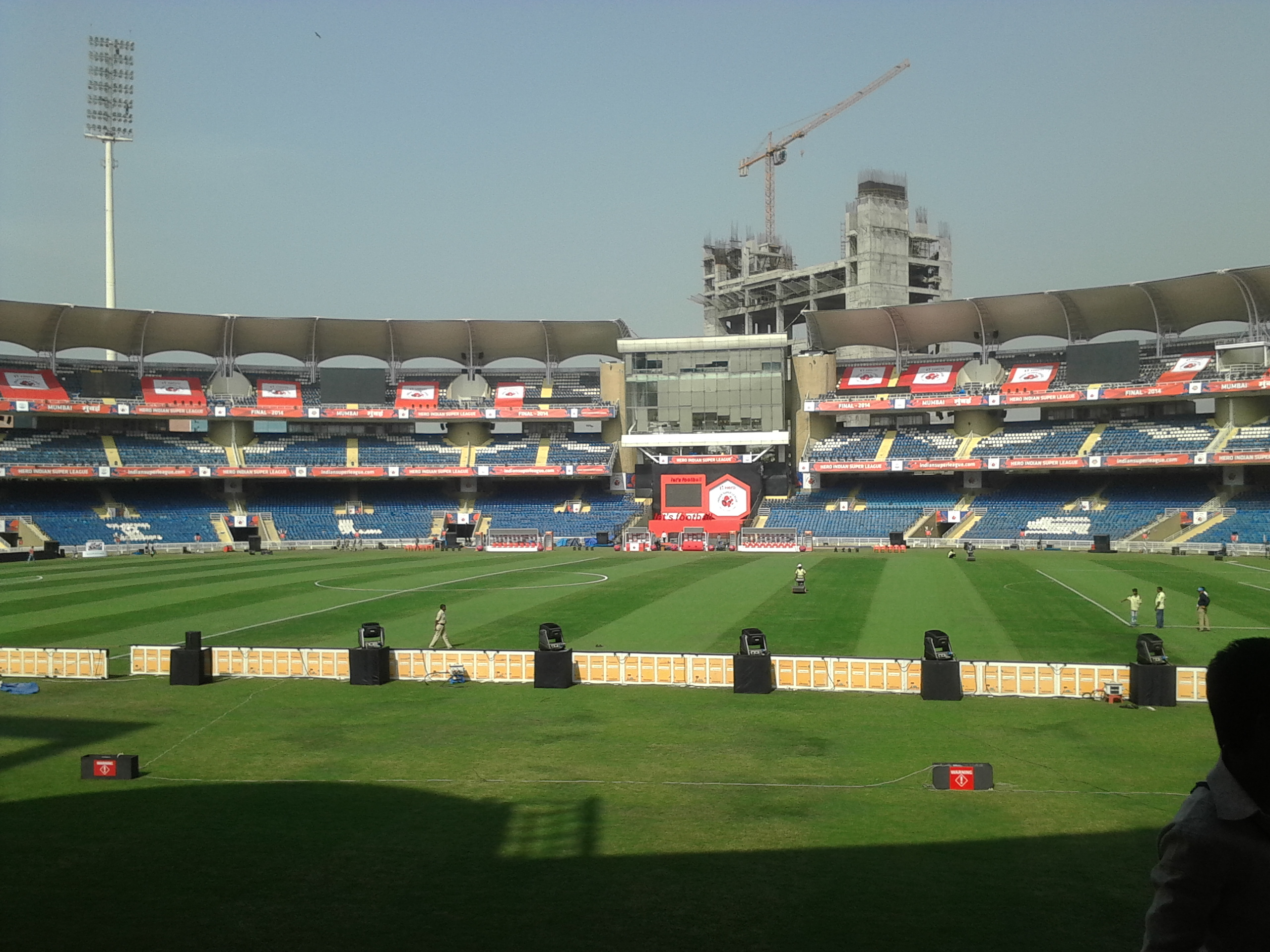
The DY Patil International Stadium in Nerul

Cricket is the most popular sport in the city. Navi Mumbai has its own International Cricket Stadium in Shiravne (Nerul) called the DY Patil Stadium which hosts IPL T-20 matches, including hosting the 2008 and 2010 IPL finals. It was one of the two venues for the inaugural edition of the Women's Premier League (WPL) in 2023. It is also the home ground for the Indian Super League football club Mumbai City FC. The Fr. Agnel Stadium in Vashi is the training ground of the team.

Navi Mumbai was one of the host cities of the 2017 FIFA U-17 Men's World Cup and the 2022 FIFA U-17 Women's World Cup with the DY Patil Stadium hosting the final of the event in 2022.

Navi Mumbai Sports Association is the oldest sports complex in Navi Mumbai; NMSA has contributed significantly to the sports world by creating international level athletes from Navi Mumbai. Navi Mumbai has an Olympic-size swimming pool at Nerul. CIDCO has proposed two 18-hole golf course academies at Nerul.

== Education ==
Provision of schools and colleges was a priority in the planning of Navi Mumbai. The nodes were designed to provide one primary school per 5,000 people, one high school for 12,500 people and one college for 50,000 people.

Each of the nodes is self-sufficient in terms of providing quality education. Students are given access to various syllabi, including the State Education Board, CBSE, IGCSE, IB and CISCE patterns. Other than these, CIDCO encouraged private institutions as well.

About 22.5% of the total population is considered to be school-going children. Most students attend school and college within their node (township). 76% of the students walk to their school or college, 12% use public transport, 10% use bicycles and only 2% travel by school bus.

A number of premier schools and colleges have been set up in Navi Mumbai. Even beyond local students, students from Mumbai and even outside come to Navi Mumbai in their quest for quality education. As such, Navi Mumbai is quickly acquiring the title of educational hub. Some of these premium institutions have been listed below.

=== Colleges and universities ===
- Indian Maritime University Navi Mumbai
- ITM Group of Institutions
- Pillai University
- Dr. D. Y. Patil Medical College, Hospital & Research Centre

=== Engineering colleges ===
- Fr. Conceicao Rodrigues Institute of Technology, Vashi
- Datta Meghe College of Engineering, Airoli
- Indian Institution of Industrial Engineering, Belapur
- Lokmanya Tilak College of Engineering, Koparkhairane
- Pillai College of Engineering, New Panvel
- Ramrao Adik Institute of Technology, Nerul
- SIES Graduate School of Technology, Nerul

=== Medical colleges ===
- Bharati Vidyapeeth Dental College, Kharghar
- MGM Institute of Health Sciences, Kalamboli
- Terna Medical College, Nerul

=== Schools ===
- Avalon Heights International School
- Fr. Agnel Multipurpose School and Junior College, Vashi
- Dr Pillai Global Academy, New Panvel
