= Panvel Creek =

Panvel Creek is a creek near the city of Panvel, near Mumbai. The creek opens up into the Thane Creek. Dredging activity takes place in this creek. The Panvel #or Ulve) creek gets special mention in the Bombay Gazette records. The 7 km long creek passes through Taloja, Panvel and Ulve, before entering the sea at Belapur.

In the history, the creek used to have pearls on its sandy bed and was a focal point of trade and commerce with Persia. The creek is mined for its dark sand and is used for dumping of debris on both sides of the creek, creating much pollution.

The Maharashtra government and its City and Industrial Development Corporation (Cidco) have identified 1,500 hectares at Madh island in Panvel creek near Navi Mumbai as an alternative site for the proposed international airport. In the first model, filling of 1.5 metres on the proposed 1,500 ha is identified in Panvel creek. In the case of flooding due to rain, a permanent pumping system will be put in place. The airport will be constructed at Rs 3,000 crore.
