= Pen railway station =

Railway station in Maharashtra, India

Pen
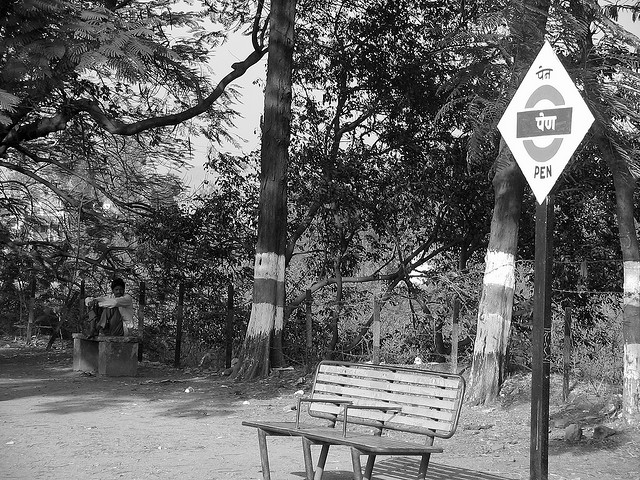

General information
- Location: N.H.66 Pen Dist - Raigad
- Coordinates: 18.7354°N 73.0867°E
- System: Regular = Indian Railways Station
- Owner: Indian Railways
- Line: Panvel–Roha line
- Platforms: 3
- Tracks: 7

Construction
- Structure type: standard on Ground Station
- Parking: Yes

Other information
- Status: Active
- Station code: PEN
- Fare zone: Central Railway

Services
Preceding station	Mumbai Suburban Railway	Following station
Hamrapur towards Vasai Road	Vasai Road–Roha line	Kasu towards Roha
Route map
Location
- Location within India Location within Maharashtra

Pen railway station is a railway station on the Panvel–Roha route of Central Railway in India. It is at a distance of 103.59 km from Chhatrapati Shivaji Maharaj Terminus via Diva Junction. Its station code is PEN. It belongs to the Mumbai division of Central Railway.

The station is situated in Raigad district of Maharashtra. It is situated between Hamrapur and Kasu railway stations. Two MEMUs originate from here and terminate at Diva Junction and vice versa. In addition to this, MEMUs from Roha to Diva and vice versa halts here. Also, Dadar–Ratnagiri Passenger and Diva–Sindhudurg Passenger also has a halt here. These trains are being utilized completely by the local people but still there is a long pending demand to start Local trains on this route both slow and fast services, for the convenience of the passengers. It will also facilitate office-goers who goes to SoBo or Mumbai Suburbs on a regular basis.

There's a goods train's line bifurcating from main line and goes to a factory in Alibag. There's a recent plan to introduce passenger train services on this route, thereby reducing travel time of the office-goers as Pen has direct passenger train services to Thane and Dadar. At present one needs to take an ST (State Transport) bus to Pen and then take a train or ST bus to Panvel, from where they can easily board the Local trains to Mumbai.
