= Nagothane railway station =

Railway Station in Maharashtra, India

Nagothane

General information
- Location: N.H.66 Tal - Roha, Dist - Raigad
- Coordinates: 18.540°N 73.141°E
- System: Regular
- Owner: Indian Railways
- Line: Panvel–Roha line
- Platforms: 2
- Tracks: 6

Construction
- Structure type: standard on Ground
- Parking: Yes
- Cycle facilities: No

Other information
- Status: Yes
- Station code: NGTN
- Fare zone: Central Railway

History
- Electrified: Yes

Services
Preceding station	Mumbai Suburban Railway	Following station
Kasu towards Vasai Road	Vasai Road–Roha line	Nidi towards Roha
Route map
Location
- Location within India Location within Maharashtra

Nagothane railway station is a railway station on the Panvel–Roha route of Central Railway in India. It is 130.91 km from Chhatrapati Shivaji Maharaj Terminus via Diva Junction. Its station code is NGTN. It belongs to the Mumbai division of Central Railway.

The station is in Raigad district of Maharashtra. It is between Kasu and Nidi railway stations.
