= Apta railway station =

Railway station in Maharashtra, India

Apta
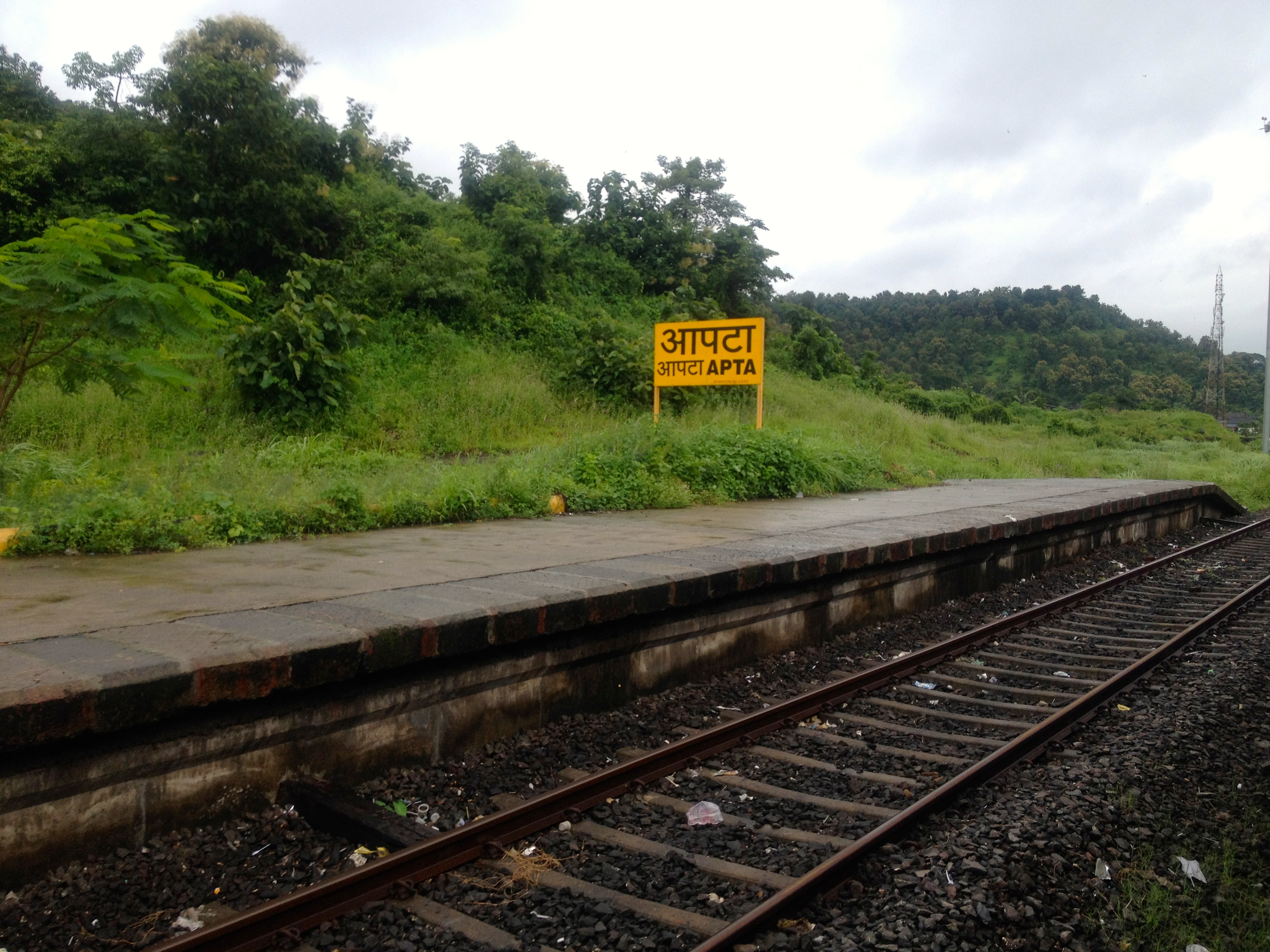
- Apta Railway station

General information
- Location: Dist - Raigad
- Coordinates: 18.8635°N 73.1528°E
- System: Indian Railways Station
- Owner: Indian Railways
- Line: Panvel–Roha line
- Platforms: 2
- Tracks: 4
- Connections: Bollywood Station

Construction
- Structure type: on Ground Station
- Parking: Yes

Other information
- Status: Active
- Station code: APTA
- Fare zone: Central Railway

History
- Electrified: Yes

Services
Preceding station	Mumbai Suburban Railway	Following station
Rasayani towards Vasai Road	Vasai Road–Roha line	Jite towards Roha
Route map
Location
- Location within India Location within Maharashtra

Apta railway station is a railway station on the Panvel–Roha route of Central Railway in India. The station is situated in Raigad district of Navi Mumbai city in Maharashtra. It is 83.24 km from Chhatrapati Shivaji Maharaj Terminus via Diva Junction. Its station code is APTA. It belongs to the Mumbai Railway Division of Central Railway.

== Popular cultures ==
The last scene of Dilwale Dulhania Le Jayenge starring Shah Rukh Khan and Kajol was shot there. The action scene of the Rajkumar Santoshi's Khakee was also taken there. Other movies that were shot at this location include Bunty Aur Babli, Chinatown, Fida, Rang De Basanti, Shaadi No. 1, Swades, Slumdog Millionaire and Aahat (season 4 ep 1 Blara Junction).
