= Hamrapur railway station =

Railway station in Maharashtra, India

Hamrapur

General information
- Location: Hamrapur Tal- Pen, Dist-
- Coordinates: 18.7839°N 73.0793°E
- System: Regular
- Owner: Indian Railways
- Line: Panvel–Roha line
- Platforms: 2
- Tracks: 2

Construction
- Structure type: on Ground

Other information
- Status: Active
- Station code: HMPR
- Fare zone: Central Railway

History
- Electrified: Yes

Services
Preceding station	Mumbai Suburban Railway	Following station
Jite towards Vasai Road	Vasai Road–Roha line	Pen towards Roha
Route map
Location
- Location within Maharashtra

Hamrapur is a railway station on the Panvel–Roha route of Central Railway in India. It is 98 km from Chhatrapati Shivaji Maharaj Terminus via Diva Junction. Its station code is HMPR. It belongs to the Mumbai division of Central Railway.

The station is in Raigad district of Maharashtra. It is between Jite and Pen railway stations.
