= Somatne railway station =

Railway station in Maharashtra, India

General information
- Location: Panvel, Dist - Raigad
- Coordinates: 18.9506°N 73.1455°E
- System: Regular
- Owner: Indian Railways
- Line: Vasai Road–Roha line
- Platforms: 2
- Tracks: 4

Construction
- Structure type: on Ground

Other information
- Status: Active
- Station code: SMNE
- Fare zone: Central Railway

History
- Electrified: Yes

Services
Preceding station	Mumbai Suburban Railway	Following station
Panvel towards Vasai Road	Vasai Road–Roha line	Rasayani towards Roha
Route map
Location
- Location within India Location within Maharashtra

Somatne is a railway station on the Panvel–Roha route of Central Railway in India. It is at a distance of 73.3 km from Chhatrapati Shivaji Maharaj Terminus via Diva Junction. Its station code is SMNE. It belongs to the Mumbai division of Central Railway.

The station is situated in Raigad district of Navi Mumbai, Maharashtra. It is situated between Panvel and Rasayani railway stations, both too in Navi Mumbai.
