= Rasayani railway station =

Railway Station in Maharashtra, India

Rasayani

General information
- Location: Rasayani Tal- Khalapur, Dist - Raigad
- Coordinates: 18.8940°N 73.1517°E
- System: Regular
- Owner: Indian Railways
- Line: Panvel–Roha line
- Platforms: 2
- Tracks: 2

Construction
- Structure type: on Ground

Other information
- Status: Active
- Station code: RSYI
- Fare zone: Central Railway

History
- Electrified: Yes

Services
Preceding station	Mumbai Suburban Railway	Following station
Somtane towards Vasai Road	Vasai Road–Roha line	Apta towards Roha
Route map
Location
- Location within India Location within Maharashtra

Rasayani railway station is a railway station on the Panvel–Roha route of Central Railway. It is at a distance of 79.8 km from Chhatrapati Shivaji Maharaj Terminus via Diva Junction. Its station code is RSYI. It belongs to the Mumbai division of Central Railway.

The station is situated in Raigad district of Navi Mumbai city, of Maharashtra, an Indian state. It is situated between Somtane and Apta railway stations, both too in Navi Mumbai city.
