= Kasu railway station =

Railway Station in Maharashtra, India

Kasu
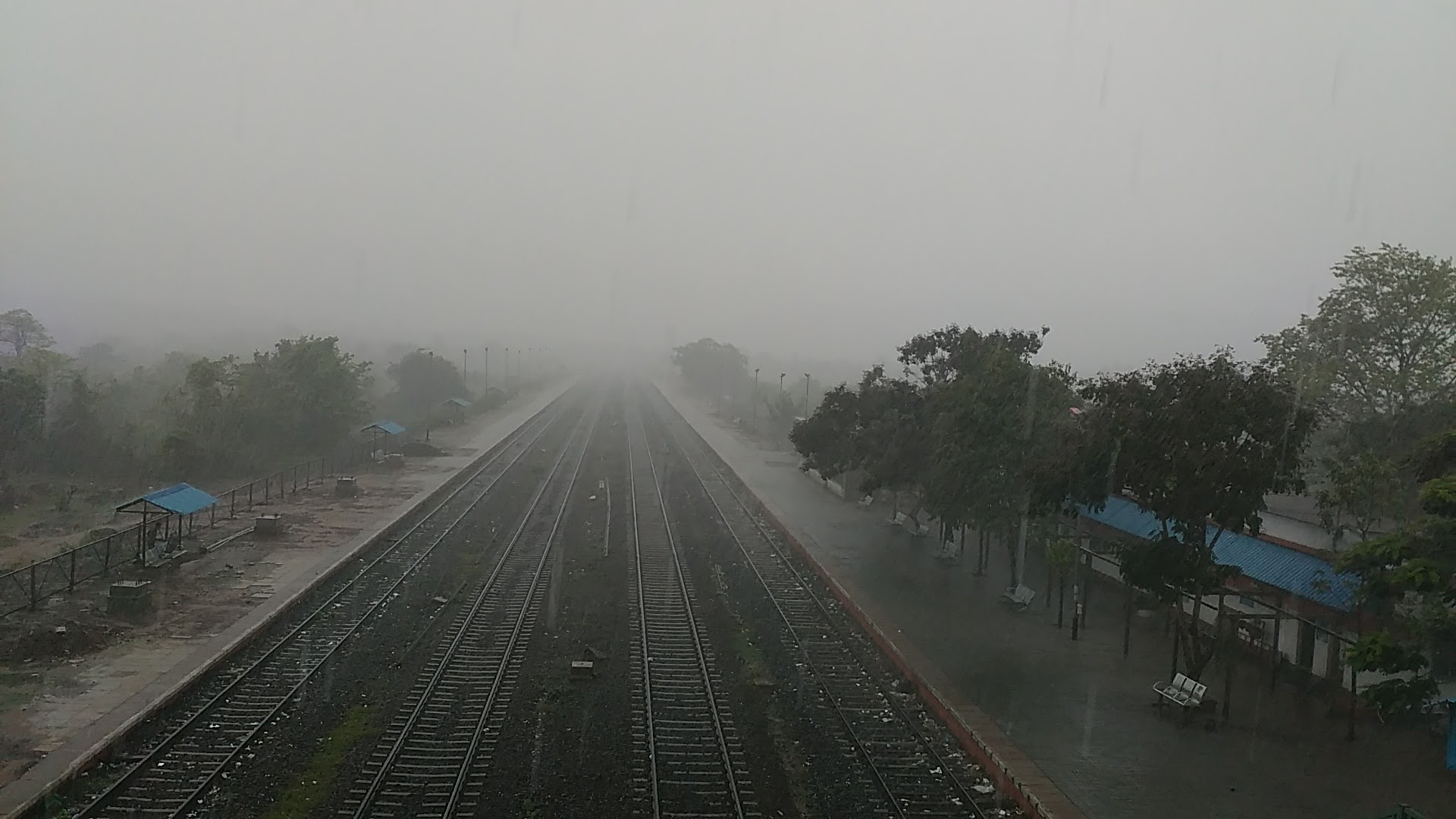
- Kasu Railway station in Monsoon

General information
- Location: Tal - Pen, Dist - Raigad
- Coordinates: 18.6413°N 73.0794°E
- System: Indian Railway Station
- Owner: Indian Railways
- Line: Panvel–Roha line
- Platforms: 2
- Tracks: 4

Construction
- Structure type: structure On Ground
- Parking: No
- Cycle facilities: No

Other information
- Status: Active
- Station code: KASU
- Fare zone: Central Railway

History
- Electrified: Yes

Services
| Preceding station | Mumbai Suburban Railway | Following station |
|---|---|---|
| Pen towards Vasai Road | Vasai Road–Roha line | Nagothane towards Roha |
Route map
Location
- Location within India Location within Maharashtra

Kasu railway station (station code is KASU) is a railway station on the Panvel–Roha route of Central Railway in India. It is 117.28 km from Chhatrapati Shivaji Maharaj Terminus via Diva Junction. It belongs to the Mumbai division of Central Railway.

The station is in Raigad district of Maharashtra. It is between Pen and Nagothane railway stations.
