= Jite railway station =

Railway Station in Maharashtra, India

Jite

General information
- Coordinates: 18.8200°N 73.0869°E
- System: Regular
- Owner: Indian Railways
- Line: Panvel–Roha line
- Platforms: 2
- Tracks: 4

Construction
- Structure type: On ground station
- Parking: Available

Other information
- Status: Functioning
- Station code: JITE
- Fare zone: Central Railway

History
- Electrified: Yes

Services
Preceding station	Mumbai Suburban Railway	Following station
Apta towards Vasai Road	Vasai Road–Roha line	Hamrapur towards Roha
Route map
Location
- Location within India Location within Maharashtra

Jite is a railway station on the Panvel–Roha route of Central Railway in India. It is 93.01 km from Chhatrapati Shivaji Maharaj Terminus via Diva Junction. Its station code is JITE. It belongs to the Mumbai division of the Central Railway.

The station is in the Raigad district of Maharashtra. It is between Apta and Hamrapur railway stations.
