= Navde Road railway station =

Railway station in Maharashtra, India

Navde Road

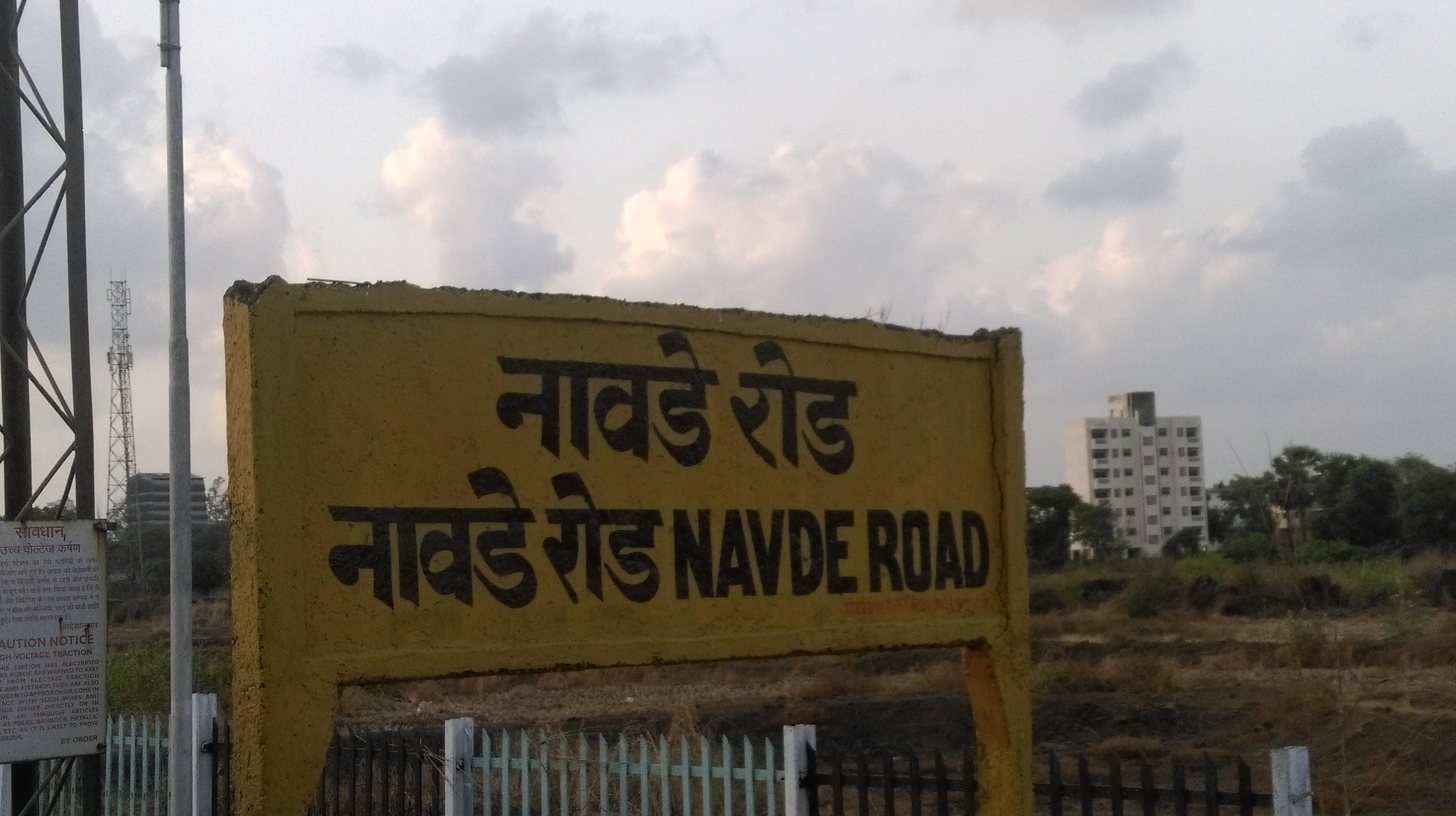

General information
- Location: Navde Gaon Road Tal.- Panvel, Dist - Raigad
- Coordinates: 19.053374°N 73.103183°E
- System: Mumbai Suburban Railway station
- Owner: Ministry of Railways, Indian Railways
- Line: Vasai Road–Roha line
- Platforms: 3
- Tracks: 4

Construction
- Structure type: Standard on-ground station
- Parking: No
- Cycle facilities: No

Other information
- Status: Active
- Station code: NDR
- Fare zone: Central Railways

History
- Opened: 1966

Services
Preceding station	Mumbai Suburban Railway	Following station
Taloje Panchnand towards Vasai Road	Vasai Road–Roha line	Kalamboli towards Roha
Route map
Location
- Location within Mumbai

Navde Road is a railway station on the Vasai Road–Diva–Panvel–Roha route of the Central Line, of the Mumbai Suburban Railway network. Navde node is a small node developed by CIDCO with single point access to the node.

The Navde colony is divided in two phases, Phase II in the West of the Navde Road Station and the Phase I in East of the Station. The Phase I is currently under construction. The Navade colony shares it Eastern boundary with Taloja MIDC, Northern boundary with Pandher and Southern boundary with Roadpali.

It is like a small township with 165 plots and approx 80-90 buildings. It is a part of Navi Mumbai city. Construction in this area is in developing stage and good properties are available. It has got good transportation facility from Panvel via six seater rickshaw and 73 numbered route of NMMT bus, KDMT bus nos. 20 & 70, and from CBD Belapur, NMMT bus nos. 71 and 72. There is also an auto rickshaw stand in Navde. It has close proximity to Kharghar node of CIDCO with Navade village falling in Kharghar sec 45. Also close proximity to Kalamboli.

D Mart is 1 km from Navde node and Reliance Smart 0.5 km. Navi Mumbai Metro line 1 phase 2 will be passing through Navde road and shall have interconnection with Navade railway station. Panvel–Virar local train which is approved from the government and the work is expected to start soon. There are many prominent buildings like Devdrishti, Dev Aashirwad, Neelkamal, Keshav Garden, Laxmi Kalash CHS etc.

Navde colony is on NH4 highway and connects to Sion Panvel Expressway via Taloja link road. Usually there is heavy traffic of trailers and trucks due to JNPT, oil refineries as well as, nearby MIDC area, but once the NH4 road widening and flyover is completed and proposed service roads are constructed, much lighter traffic is expected. There is also smell problem from nearby Taloja MIDC for which Navade and Kharghar/Kalamboli residents are fighting. Nearby Kasadi river is passing through Navade node but this river has contaminated water and the aqua life is totally dead due to careless attitude of the factories in Taloja MIDC.

Recently CIDCO had started to construct a holding pond in Navade near Devdrishti apartment but left it half done after some works. The internal roads have been in too poor state waiting for the awarded contractor to start construction work.

CIDCO has developed a small garden with children play area with slides and other equipments. Although small, this garden is having a jogging track, benches and a green lawn.

There is a private indoor playzone and family entertainment zone named "Happy Town." Recently open in Navde where families can spend their time instead of going far for malls. There are plots reserved for Police station, market, temple and post office but is not at all developed from CIDCO. Every Thursday and Saturday there is market which sells vegetables, household items, clothes, bags, shoes etc.This mobile market is causing the loss to the Shop owners because they are not able to match the pricing.

In front of the colony there is illegally occupied area near NH4 and the colony. The Panvel municipal corporation isn't taking action against this illegal encroachment.

Almost all types of shops are opened in Navde node and it is self contained with very less dependency of travelling to other nodes. Also there is one 6 bed full-fledged hospital Anand Hospital in Navde apart from various clinics. Heavy vehicles and trailers are parked illegally at the internal roadside for which government should take action to avoid inconvenience to Navde residences.
