= Nidi =

Nidi may refer to:

- Nidi Sohana
- Nidi Yahana Kelabei
- Nidi railway station
- Niði, see Dwarf (folklore)
