= Line 1 (Navi Mumbai Metro) =

Metro line in Navi Mumbai, India

Navi Mumbai Metro Line 1
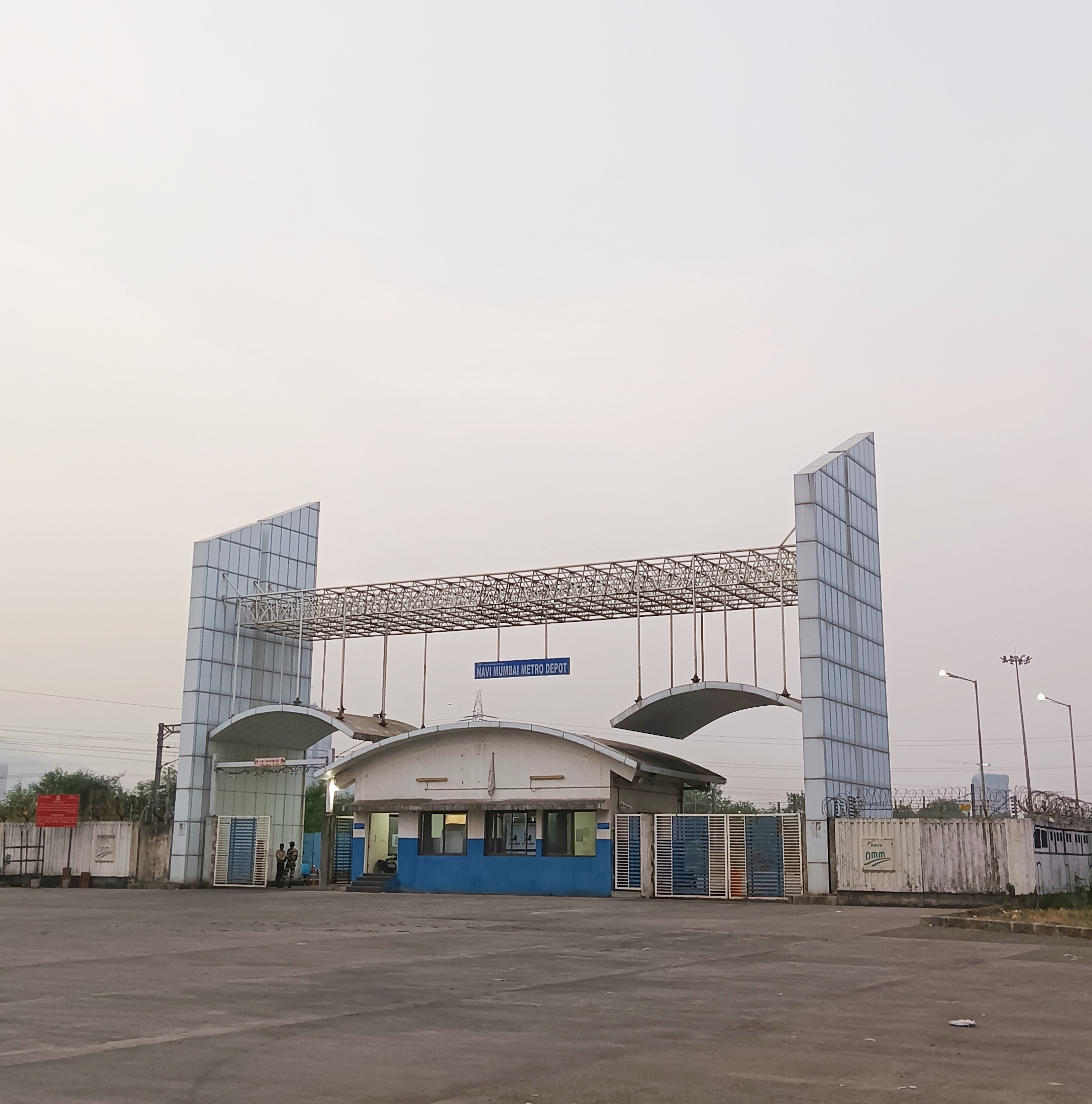
- Metro Depot in Taloja

Overview
- Status: Phase 1 - Operational; Phase 2 - Planned; Phase 3 - Planned
- Owner: CIDCO
- Line number: 1
- Locale: Navi Mumbai, Maharashtra, India
- Termini: Belapur; Khandeshwar
- Stations: 20

Service
- Type: Rapid transit
- System: Navi Mumbai Metro
- Operator: Maha Metro
- Depot: Taloja
- Rolling stock: CRRC Zhuzhou Locomotive

History
- Work began: 28 October 2011
- Opened: 17 November 2023; 3 years ago

Technical
- Line length: 23.4 km (14.5 mi)
- Num of tracks: 2
- Character: Elevated
- Track gauge: 1,435 mm (4 ft 8 1/2 in) standard gauge
- Electrification: 25 kV 50 Hz AC overhead catenary
- Operating speed: 32 km/h (20 mph)
Route map

Line 1 of the Navi Mumbai Metro is part of the rapid transit rail system for the city of Navi Mumbai, India. When fully completed, the 23.40 km fully-elevated line will consist of 20 metro stations from Belapur to Khandeshwar.

Construction on the line began in 2011 and was originally scheduled to open in 2016, but faced several delays. An 11.1 km (6.9 mi) section from Belapur to Pendhar with 11 stations, The Phase 1 of the line was inaugurated on 17 November 2023.

== History ==
The following dates represent the dates the section opened to the public, not the private inauguration.

History
Extension date	Termini		Length	Stations
17 November 2023	Belapur	Pendhar	11.1 kilometers (6.9 mi)	11
	Pendhar	MIDC Taloja	2.2 kilometers (1.4 mi)	1
	MIDC Taloja	Khandeshwar	10.30 kilometers (6.40 mi)	8
Total	Belapur	Khandeshwar	23.60 kilometers (14.66 mi)	20

=== Planning ===
The Government of Maharashtra issued a gazette notification on the proposed Navi Mumbai Metro project on 28 April 2010, requesting comments from the public. No objections or suggestions on the proposed project were received by 28 May, the final date to submit comments. The City and Industrial Development Corporation (CIDCO) was named as the implementing agency for the proposed Belapur–Pendhar–Kalamboli–Khandeshwar line, under the Indian Tramway Act 1886, by the Government of Maharashtra on 30 September 2010. The state government later asked CIDCO to implement the Navi Mumbai Metro project under the Central Metro Act.

The Delhi Metro Rail Corporation submitted the final detailed project report for the Navi Mumbai Metro project in October 2011. CIDCO appointed the Louis Berger Group and Balaji Rail Road Systems as general consultants for the project. The proposed route would link Belapur, Kharghar, Taloje, MIDC, Kalamboli and Khandeshwar, before terminating at the proposed Navi Mumbai International Airport. In September 2013, CIDCO proposed extending Line 1 up to Kalyan–Ulhasnagar–Murbad.

Line 1 is being developed in 3 phases. Phase I is an 11.1 km (6.9 mi) section from Belapur to Pendhar with 11 stations. In the second phase, an 8.15-kilometre (5.06 mi) line will be built from Khandeshwar to Taloje MIDC, with seven stations. The third phase will entail the merging of two rail corridors between Pendhar and MIDC with a 2.2-kilometre (1.4 mi) link, forming a loop from Belapur to Khandeshwar.

Phase	Section	Length	Stations	Cost (2012 estimate)
Phase I	Belapur to Pendhar	11.10 kilometres (6.90 mi)	11	₹1,984 crore (US$210 million)
Phase II	Khandeshwar to MIDC Taloja (extension to Airport proposed)	10.30 kilometres (6.40 mi)	8	₹1,509 crore (US$160 million)
Phase III	Interlink between Pendhar and MIDC Taloja	2.2 kilometres (1.4 mi)	1	₹574 crore (US$61 million)
Total		23.40 kilometres (14.54 mi)	20	₹4,068 crore (US$430 million)

=== Construction ===
The metro's foundation stone was laid on 1 May 2011 by Chief Minister Prithviraj Chavan, and general foundation work on the system's first phase commenced on 28 October 2011. CIDCO awarded the contract for civil works in Phase I to six firms. In June 2012, CIDCO awarded a ₹321 crore (US$34 million) contract for the construction of the 11.1 km (6.9 mi) section from Belapur to Pendhar to a consortium of San José Constructora (Spain), Mahavira Road and Infrastructure (Navi Mumbai), and Supreme Infrastructure (Mumbai). Line 1's first girder was placed on 13 December 2012. J Kumar Infraprojects Ltd was awarded a ₹132 crore (US$14 million) contract to design and build the depot at Taloja in February 2013.

The original deadline to commission Line 1 was 2016. This was later extended to mid-2017, and then mid-2018. By January 2017, only 60% of the work on Phase I stations had been completed. Finding the progress of work to be unsatisfactory, CIDCO sent a notice terminating the contract to the San José-Mahavira-Supreme consortium on 11 January 2017. On 1 March 2017, CIDCO floated new tenders to complete the remaining 40% work on the Belapur-Pendhar section. The new contract was estimated to be worth ₹141 crore (US$15 million). The consortium appealed the termination of the contract in the Bombay High Court in February 2017. In September 2017, the Court permitted the consortium to proceed with civil works on 5 stations and permitted CIDCO to re-tender the remaining 6 stations.

Nashik-based Prakash Constrowell Limited was awarded the contract to complete work on the 6 stations. In December 2018, Navi Mumbai Metro's superintending engineer Deepak Hartalkar stated that "work on the elevated corridor is almost complete" with 68% of the stations and 50% work on the signal system having been completed. In September 2019, a CIDCO official stated that around 83% of work on stations had been completed. The official also stated that a metro train had been run on the 3 km (1.9 mi) section of track connecting Pendhar station with the depot at Taloja. Prakash Constrowell was unable to carry out any work for several months due to the pending court case filed by the previous contractors. In 2020, Prakash Constrowell requested CIDCO to terminate its contract. In March 2020, the Comptroller and Auditor General of India's report on state public sector undertakings accused CIDCO of “inadequate planning for the execution of individual projects” including the Navi Mumbai Metro project.

In January 2021, CIDCO issued a press statement declaring that development work of six stations "had not been executed at the expected speed" due to the COVID-19 pandemic and some technical issues. It also announced that it had appointed Maharashtra Metro Rail Corporation Limited (Maha Metro) to complete the work on Phase I at a cost of ₹850 crore (US$91 million). In July, CIDCO appointed Mahametro to operate and maintain Line 1 for 10 years, for which CIDCO will pay Mahametro ₹885 crore (US$95 million) plus taxes. On 7 May, CIDCO conducted a successful trial run on the approach route to and the test track at Taloja metro depot, and claimed that it was "successful in all respects".

The Research Design and Standards Organisation (RDSO) began oscillation and emergency breaking distance trials on 28 August. The RDSO also tested rolling stock on different parameters including speed weight and breaking. Oscillation trials were completed on the 5.14 km (3.19 mi) section from Pendhar to Central Park station on 14 September. The RDSO granted Interim Speed Certificate for the section from Central Park to Pendhar station in October. In the same month, the Commissioner of Metro Railway Safety (CMRS) required the replacement of the bearings on most of the pillars on the stretch between Belapur and Kharghar. Mahametro awarded a ₹168.22 crore (US$18 million) contract to J Kumar Infraprojects Ltd to complete the remaining work in November 2021.

The CMRS began conducting safety inspections on the stretch between Pendhar and Central Park stations on 17 January 2022. The section received approval from the CMRS in April 2022. Mahametro completed a successful trial run on the 5.96 km (3.70 mi) section between Central Park and Belapur on 30 December 2022. In April 2023, CIDCO responded to a Right to Information query filed by activist Anil Galgali stating that only 5 of the 11 stations were complete and ready for service, while work was still ongoing at the remaining stations. The CMRS completed its final safety inspection of Phase I on 25 April, and issued the final safety certification for Phase I on 21 June 2023. Operation projected to commence in 23.11.2023.

== Funding ==
Phase I of the line from Belapur to Pendhar was estimated to cost ₹1,984 crore (equivalent to ₹41 billion or US$440 million in 2026) in 2012. The cost at the time of completion in 2023 was estimated to be ₹3,063.63 crore (US$330 million). Phase I was executed using CIDCO funds. CIDCO had spent ₹2,600 crore (US$280 million) on the project as of December 2022. The agency secured a ₹500 crore (US$53 million) line of credit from ICICI Bank on 25 November 2022. CIDCO stated that it would fund the rest of the project using the line of credit and the agency's internal accruals.

== Stations ==
=== Stage 1 ===
Line 1
#	Station Name		Inter-station Distance (km)	Cumulative Distance (km)	Opening	Connections
#	English	Marathi	Inter-station Distance (km)	Cumulative Distance (km)	Opening	Connections
1	CBD Belapur	सी.बी.डी. बेलापूर)	0.06	0.06	17 November 2023	CBD Belapur
2	RBI Colony	आर.बी.आय. कॉलनी	0.71	0.77	17 November 2023	None
3	Belpada	बेलपाडा	1.27	2.04	17 November 2023	Kharghar
4	Utsav Chowk (Kharghar)	उत्सव चौक (खारघर)	1.37	3.41	17 November 2023	None
5	Kendriya Vihar	केंद्रीय विहार	0.71	4.12	17 November 2023	None
6	Kharghar Village	खारघर गाव	1	5.12	17 November 2023	None
7	Central Park (Kharghar)	सेंट्रल पार्क (खारघर)	1	6.12	17 November 2023	None
8	Pethpada (Kharghar)	पेठपाडा (खारघर)	1.32	7.44	17 November 2023	None
9	Amandoot	अमनदूत	1.23	8.67	17 November 2023	Orange Line
10	Pethali - Taloja	पेठाली - तळोजा	1.48	10.67	17 November 2023	Taloje Panchnand
11	Pendhar	पेणधर	0.95	11.10	17 November 2023	None

=== Stage 2 ===
Line 2
#	Station Name	Inter-station Distance (km)	Cumulative Distance (km)	Opening	Connections
12	MIDC Station 2	1.50	8.35		None
13	MIDC Station 1	1.20	6.85		None
14	Kasadi	1.15	5.65		None
15	Sector 7E (Kalamboli)	1.63	4.50		None
16	Sector 13 (Kalamboli)	0.77	2.87		None
17	Sector 2E (Kalamboli)	1.01	2.10		None
18	Sector 10 (Kamothe)	0.99	1.09		None
19	Khandeshwar	0.10	0.10		Khandeshwar

As part of a revised Stage 2 in 2026, the Maharashtra Government has approved Metro Line 1A, a 3 km extension from Sagar Sangam to Belapur CBD - connecting with the Proposed Mumbai Metro Gold Line 8 at Sagar Sangam.

=== Stage 3 ===
Stage 3 involves the construction of a 2 km link and one station between Pendhar and MIDC, to join Stage 1 and Stage 2, and also the construction of a 5 km link to connect the upcoming Navi Mumbai International Airport from Khandeshwar, from where the Navi Mumbai International Airport Metro Station will be connected with the proposed Line 8 (Gold Line) of Mumbai Metro till Chhatrapati Shivaji Maharaj International Airport.

== Infrastructure and operations ==
An international consortium of companies including Ansaldo STS, Tata Projects and CSR Zhuzhou was awarded a EUR 78 million contract to supply the electrical and mechanical systems for Phase I in July 2014. Ansaldo STS carried out systems integration and supplied the communications-based train control signalling system, telecommunications, automated fare collection and equipment storage. CSR Zhuzhou was responsible for supplying 8 three-coach trainsets for Phase I.

=== Rolling stock ===
The three-car trainsets are 64.6 metres (212 ft) long and 3.1 metres (10 ft) wide, with a passenger capacity of around 1,128 (including 150 seated passengers) and a maximum speed of 80 km/h (50 mph). The first two rakes arrived at Mumbai port in March 2019. All 8 trainsets were delivered to Mumbai port by 15 May 2020.

=== Depot ===
The depot for train maintenance is located at Taloja.

=== Power ===
Line 1 is electrified at 25 kV 50 Hz AC, with power provided via an overhead catenary. The line has two traction substations located at Panchanand and Kharghar.

=== Fares ===
The minimum fare on the line is ₹10 (11¢ US), and maximum fare for an end-to-end trip on Phase I is ₹30.

Non Fare Revenue

CIDCO has awarded Advertising rights to Bright Outdoor Media Pvt ltd, covering the rights to 85,000 sq.ft of all 11 stations for 10 years.
