= Nilaje railway station =

Railway Station in Maharashtra, India

Nilaje

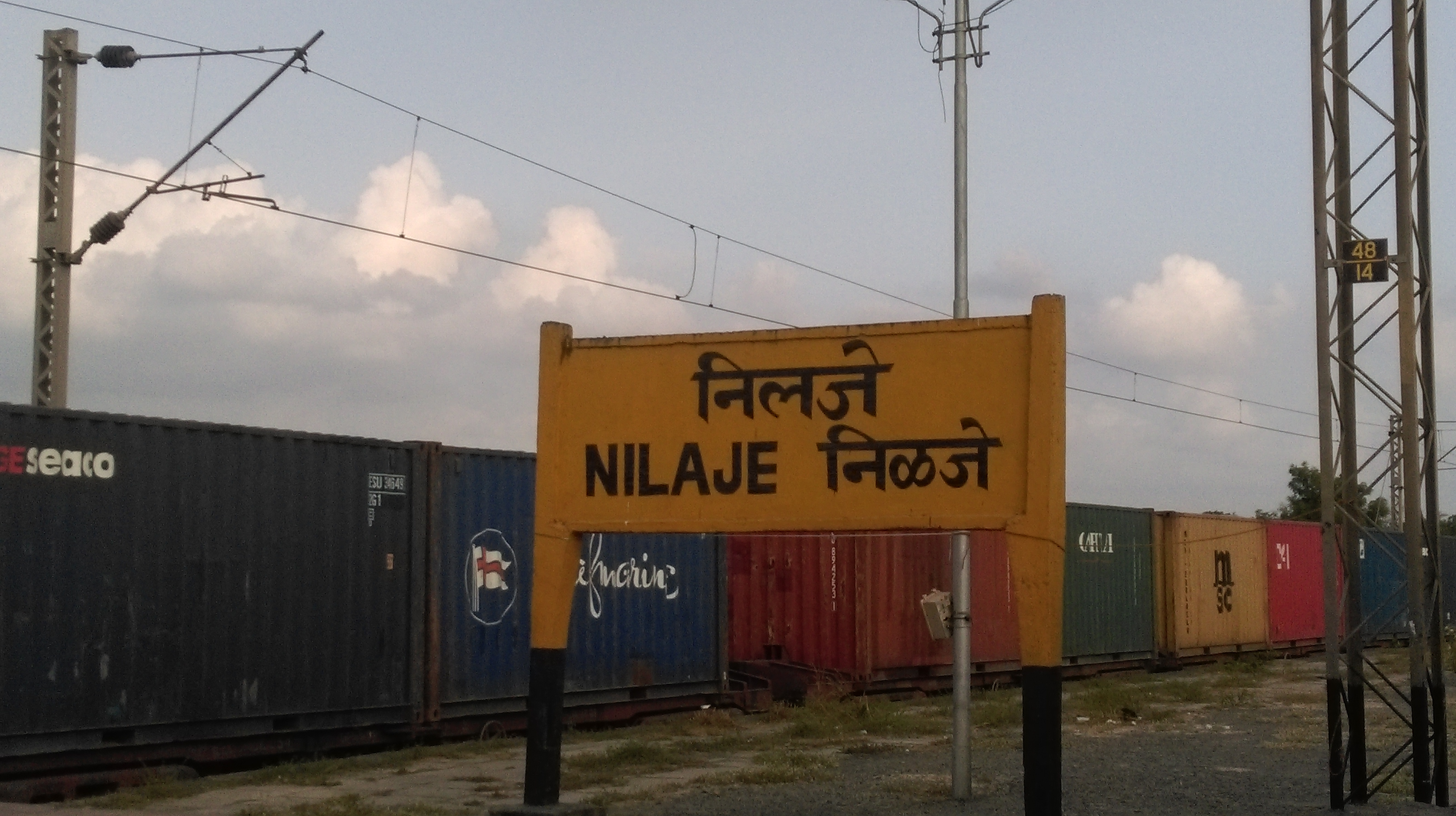

General information
- Coordinates: 19.155060°N 73.080282°E
- System: Mumbai Suburban Railway station
- Owner: Ministry of Railways, Indian Railways
- Line: Vasai Road–Roha line
- Platforms: 2
- Tracks: 4

Construction
- Structure type: Standard on-ground station
- Parking: No
- Cycle facilities: No

Other information
- Status: Active
- Station code: NIIJ
- Fare zone: Central Railways

History
- Opened: 1966

Services
Preceding station	Mumbai Suburban Railway	Following station
Dativali towards Vasai Road	Vasai Road–Roha line	Taloja Panchnand towards Roha
Route map
Location
- Location within India Location within Maharashtra Location within Mumbai

Nilaje is a railway station on the Vasai–Diva–Panvel–Roha route of the Central Line, of the Mumbai Suburban Railway network. The station code is NIIJ. It has three platforms.

== Gallery ==
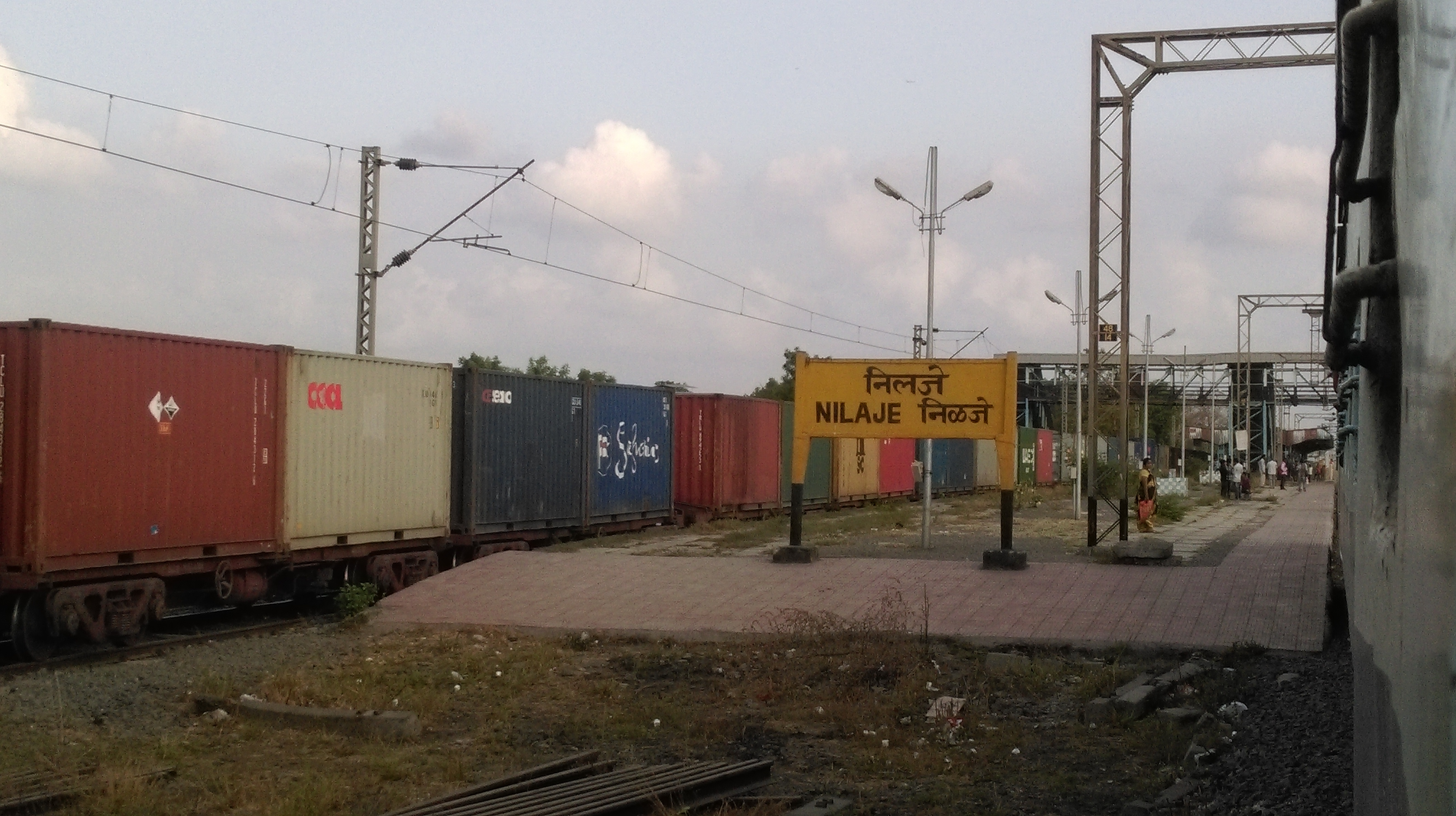
Nilaje railway station – Approach

Nilaje railway station – Platform board
