= Dativali railway station =

Railway Station in Maharashtra, India

Dativali

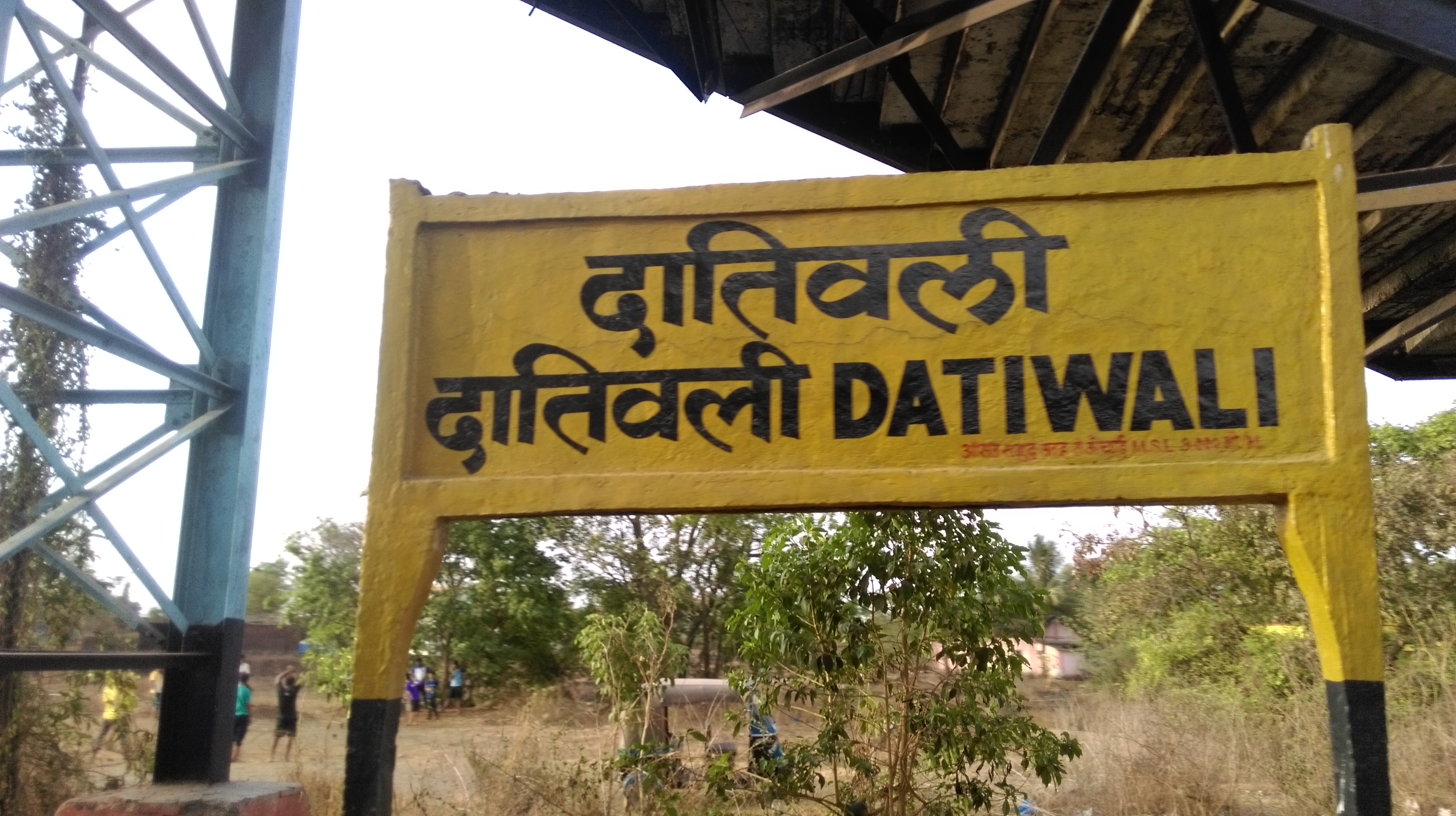

General information
- Location: Datiwali Gaon, Thane, Maharashtra 400612
- Coordinates: 19.187063°N 73.059211°E
- Elevation: 9.000 metres (29.528 ft)
- System: Mumbai Suburban Railway station
- Owner: Ministry of Railways, Indian Railways
- Operator: Mumbai Suburban Railway
- Line: Vasai Road–Roha line
- Platforms: 3
- Tracks: 2

Construction
- Structure type: Standard on-ground station

Other information
- Status: Active
- Station code: DTVL
- Fare zone: Central Railways

Services
Preceding station	Mumbai Suburban Railway	Following station
Diva Junction towards Vasai Road	Vasai Road–Roha line	Nilaje towards Roha
Route map
Location
- Location within India Location within Mumbai

Dativali is a railway station on the Vasai Road–Diva–Panvel–Roha route of the Central Line, of the Mumbai Suburban Railway network.
