= Taloje Panchnand railway station =

Railway Station in Maharashtra, India

Taloje Panchnand

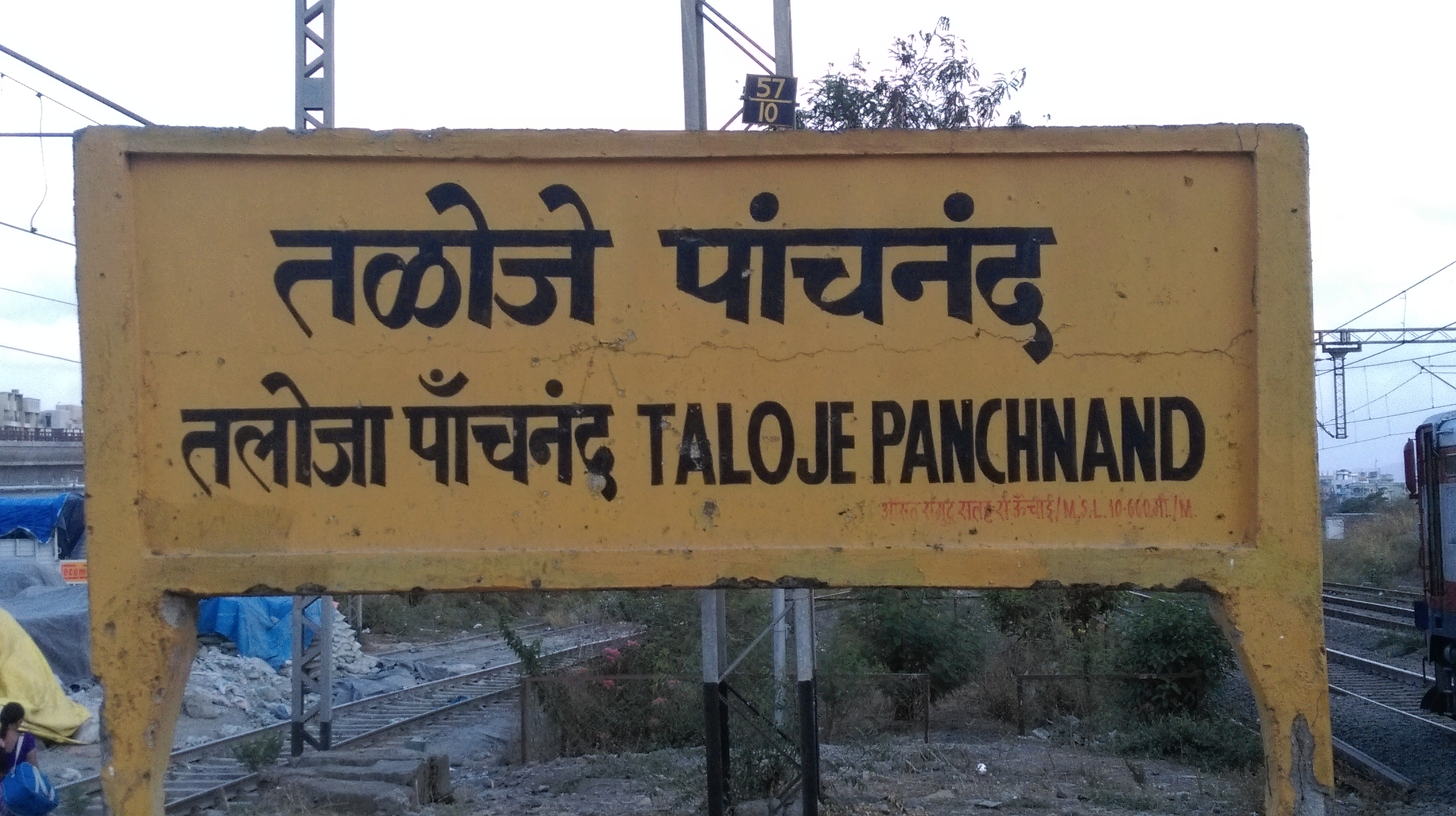

General information
- Location: Near Taloja MIDC, Navi Mumbai
- Coordinates: 19.078666°N 73.088222°E
- Elevation: 10.660 metres (34.97 ft)
- System: Mumbai Suburban Railway station
- Owner: Ministry of Railways, Indian Railways
- Line: Vasai Road–Roha line
- Platforms: 2
- Tracks: 4
- Connections: Pethali - Taloja

Construction
- Structure type: Standard on-ground station
- Parking: No

Other information
- Status: Active
- Station code: TPND
- Fare zone: Central Railways

History
- Opened: 1966

Services
Preceding station	Mumbai Suburban Railway	Following station
Nilaje towards Vasai Road	Vasai Road–Roha line	Navde Road towards Roha
Route map
Location
- Location within India Location within Mumbai

Taloja Panchanad (formerly Taloja) is a railway station in Taloja Panchnand in Raigad district on the Vasai Road–Diva–Panvel–Roha route of the Central Line, of the Mumbai Suburban Railway network.

Taloja Panchanand railway station and Vasai Road–Diva–Panvel route is included in suburban section. Also this section is under the consideration in MUTP 3.

Taloja Panchanand has regular trains for Panvel, Diva and Vasai. Express trains does not halt at this station, only Passenger train halts. Pethali-Taloja metro station is connected to this railway station. This station is also used for goods train (cement) unloading.

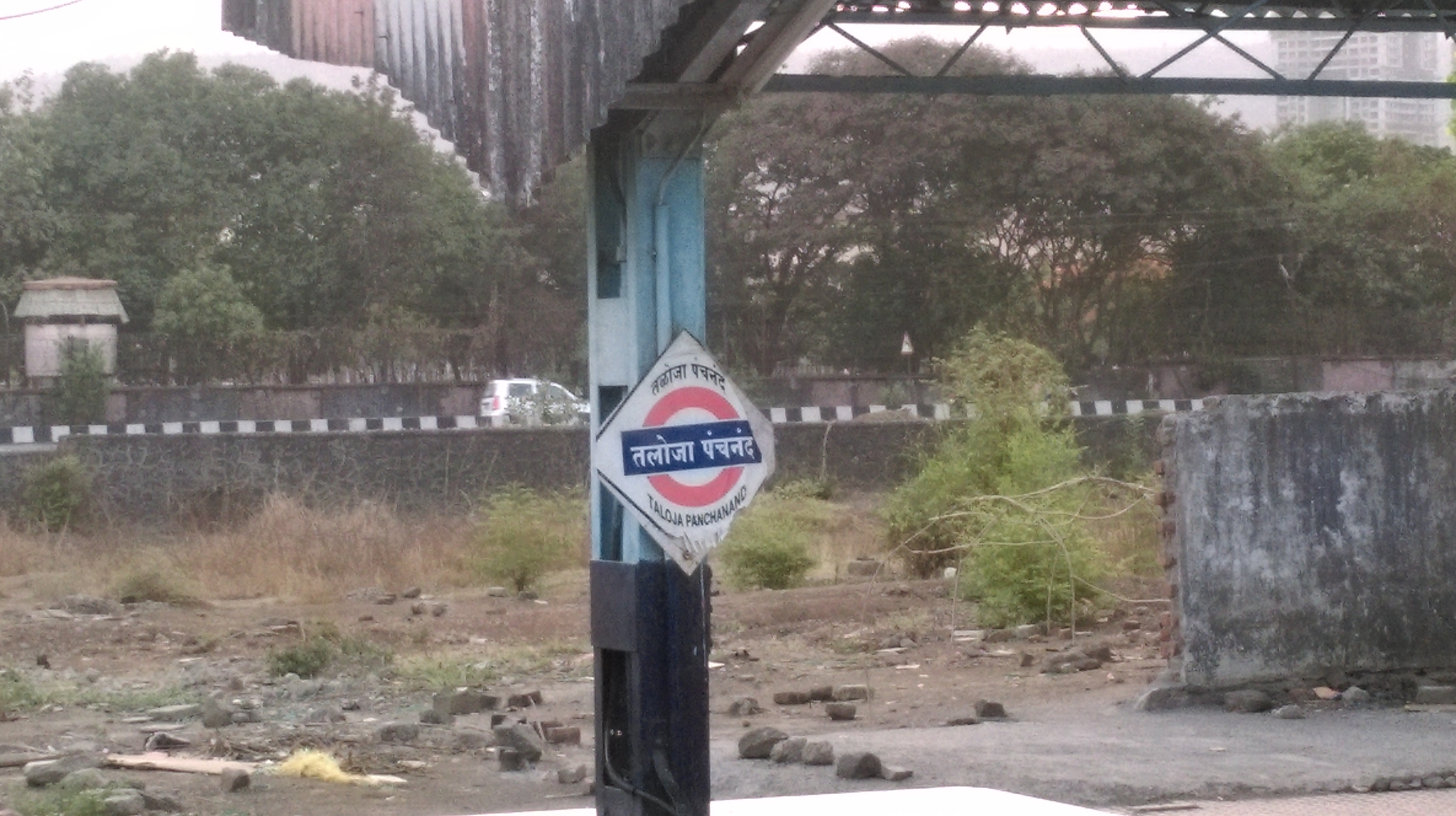
Taloja Panchnand railway station – Platform board

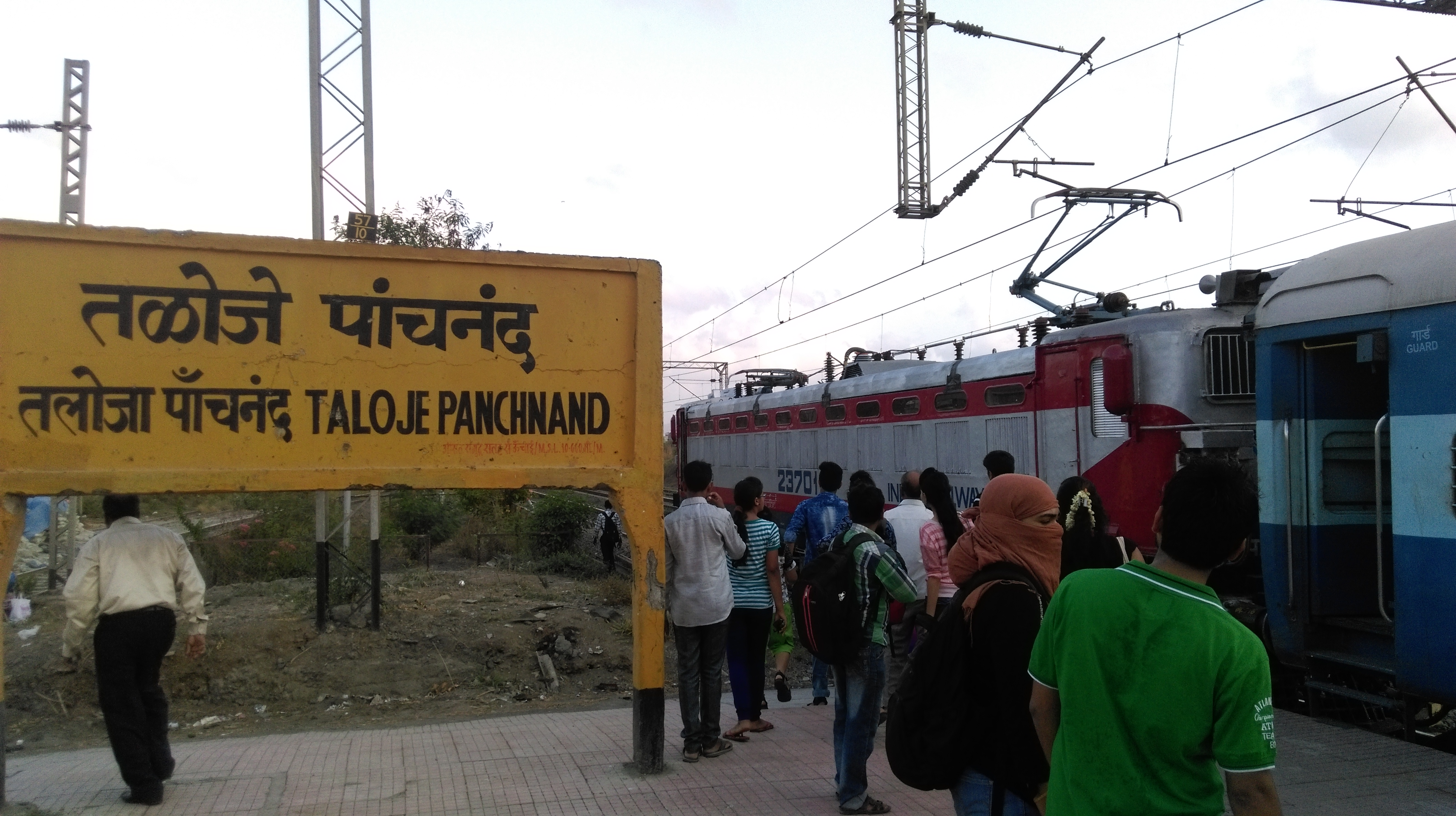
WAG-5 at Taloja Panchnand railway station
