= Nidi railway station =

Railway Station in Maharashtra, India

Nidi

General information
- Location: Nidi Tal - Roha Dist - Raigad
- Coordinates: 18.4726°N 73.1068°E
- Owner: Indian Railways
- Line: Panvel–Roha line
- Platforms: 2
- Tracks: 2

Construction
- Parking: No
- Cycle facilities: No

Other information
- Status: Active
- Station code: NIDI
- Fare zone: Central Railway

History
- Electrified: Yes

Services
Preceding station	Mumbai Suburban Railway	Following station
Nagothane towards Vasai Road	Vasai Road–Roha line	Roha Terminus
Route map
Location
- Location within Maharashtra

Nidi railway station is a railway station on the Panvel–Roha route of Central Railway in India. It is at a distance of 139.43 km from Chhatrapati Shivaji Maharaj Terminus via Diva Junction. Its station code is NIDI. It belongs to the Mumbai division of Central Railway.

The station is situated in Raigad district of Maharashtra. It is situated between Nagothane railway station and Roha railway station.

On 4 May 2014, a train derailed near here killing at least 18 people and injuring 125 others.
