= List of Navi Mumbai Metro Stations =

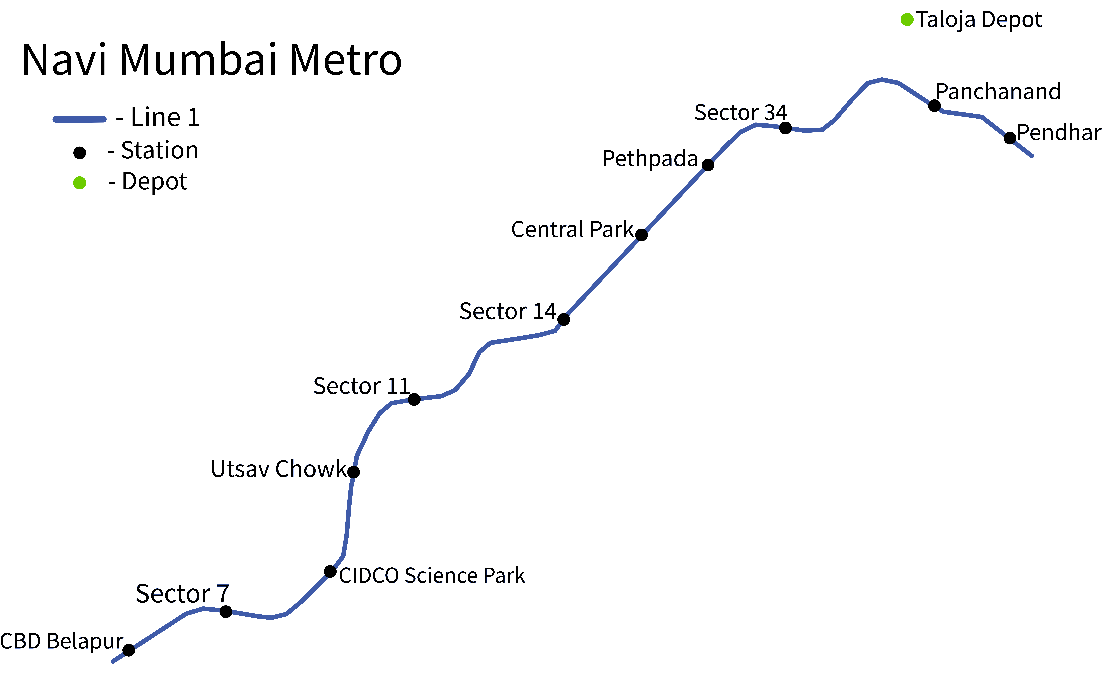
Navi Mumbai Metro map

This is a list of all the stations of the Navi Mumbai Metro, a rapid transit system serving the city of Navi Mumbai, a part of the Mumbai Metropolitan Region. It is the 16th metro system in India.

The metro is implemented by CIDCO and opened to the public on 17 November 2023.

== Metro stations ==
†	Terminal station
*	Transfer station
†*	Terminal and transfer station to Mumbai Suburban Railway
††	Transfer station to Mumbai Suburban Railway

Metro Station		Layout	Opened	Notes	Ref.
English	Marathi	Layout	Opened	Notes	Ref.
CBD Belapur†*	सी.बी.डी. बेलापूर	Elevated	17 November 2023	Interchange with CBD Belapur railway station	
RBI Colony	आर.बी.आय. कॉलनी	Elevated	17 November 2023		
Belpada††	बेलपाडा	Elevated	17 November 2023	Interchange with Kharghar railway station	
Utsav Chowk (Kharghar)	उत्सव चौक (खारघर)	Elevated	17 November 2023		
Kendriya Vihar	केंद्रीय विहार	Elevated	17 November 2023		
Kharghar Village	खारघर गाव	Elevated	17 November 2023		
Central Park (Kharghar)	सेंट्रल पार्क (खारघर)	Elevated	17 November 2023		
Pethpada (Kharghar)	पेठपाडा (खारघर)	Elevated	17 November 2023		
Amandoot	अमनदूत	Elevated	17 November 2023		
Pethali - Taloja††	पेठाली - तळोजा	Elevated	17 November 2023	Interchange with Taloje Panchnand railway station	
Pendhar†	पेणधर	Elevated	17 November 2023		

== Statistics ==
Total number of metro stations	11
Number of interchange stations	-
Number of elevated stations	11
Number of underground stations	0
Number of stations at-grade	0

== See also ==
- List of Ahmedabad Metro stations
- List of Chennai Metro stations
- List of Coimbatore Metro stations
- List of Delhi Metro stations
- List of Hyderabad Metro stations
- List of Jaipur Metro stations
- List of Kochi Metro stations
- List of Kolkata Metro stations
- List of Lucknow Metro stations
- List of Madurai Metro stations
- List of Mumbai Metro stations
- List of Noida Metro stations
- List of Nagpur Metro stations
- List of Namma Metro stations
- List of Pune Metro stations
- List of Surat Metro stations
