= Vasai Road–Roha line =

Railway line in Mumbai, India

Overview
- Status: Operational
- Owner: Indian Railway
- Locale: Palghar district Raigad district Thane district
- Termini: Vasai Road; Diva Junction, Panvel, Pen, Roha
- Stations: 23

Service
- System: Mumbai Suburban Railway
- Operator(s): Central Railway (CR); Western Railway (WR)

History
- Opened: 1964 (Diva-Panvel); 1966 (Panvel-Apta); 1983 (Diva-Vasai); 1986 (Apta-Roha)

Technical
- Number of tracks: 2
- Character: At grade
- Track gauge: 5 ft 6 in (1,676 mm) broad gauge
- Electrification: Yes
- Operating speed: 100 km/h (62 mph)

The Vasai Road–Roha line of the Mumbai Suburban Railway is a public transit system. It connects the northern suburbs of Mumbai with Navi Mumbai and Roha on the Konkan Railway. The Vasai Road–Roha line connects the Western line station of Vasai Road with the Central line station of Roha, which is the last station before Konkan Railway starts.

It intersects the main line of the Central line at Diva Junction. The MEMUs operate between Panvel–Dahanu Road MEMU, Panvel–Vasai Road MEMU, Diva–Panvel Passenger and Vasai Road–Diva DEMU. It consists of 23 stations from Vasai Road in the north to Roha in the south.

== Electrification ==
The electrification of Diva to Vasai Road line was completed in 1982-83, followed by Diva to Panvel line in 1991-92. Both of those lines used the 1500 V DC traction to match with the Mumbai division's standard. They were converted to 25 kV AC only in early 2004 to facilitate the running of freight trains hauled by AC locos because that section sees a huge amount of freight traffic, especially high-speed container trains called ConRaj or Container Rajdhani's between the JNPT/Nhava Sheva ports in Navi Mumbai and the Inland Container Depot at Tughlakabad.

== Stations ==
Vasai Road–Roha line
Station name		Station code	Connections
English	Marathi	Station code	Connections
Vasai Road	वसई रोड	BSR	Western and Indian Railways
Juchandra	जुचंद्र	JCNR	None
Kaman Road	कामण रोड	KARD	None
Kharbao	खारबाव	KHBV	None
Bhiwandi Road	भिवंडी रोड	BIRD	None
Kopar	कोपर	KOPR	Central
Diva Junction	दिवा जंक्शन	DIVA	Central
Dativali	दातिवली	DTVL	None
Nilaje	निळजे	NIIJ	None
Taloje Panchnand	तळोजे पांचनंद	TPND	Navi Mumbai Metro
Navde Road	नावडे रोड	NVRD	None
Kalamboli	कळंबोली	KLMC	None
Panvel	पनवेल	PNVL	Harbour, Trans-Harbour and Indian Railways
Somatne	सोमाटणे	SMNE	None
Rasayani	रसायनी	RSYI	None
Apta	आपटा	APTA	None
Jite	जिते	JITE	None
Hamrapur	हमरापूर	HMRR	None
Pen	पेण	PEN	None
Kasu	कासू	KASU	None
Nagothane	नागोठणे	NGTN	None
Nidi	निडी	NIDI	None
Roha	रोहे	ROHA	Konkan Railway zone

== Services ==
Up services
Train No.	Departure	Origin	Arrival	Destination
61010	5:15	Roha	7:45	Diva
61002	5:49	Dombivli	8:20	Boisar
61016	6:40	Roha	9:10	Diva
61024	6:45	Pen	8:30	Diva
69165	9:20	Panvel	11:05	Vasai Road
61018	10:30	Panvel	11:10	Diva
61004	11:30	Diva	12:30	Vasai Road
61020	13:55	Pen	15:30	Diva
61006	14:33	Diva	15:25	Vasai Road
69167	14:35	Panvel	16:10	Vasai Road
61012	15:55	Roha	18:50	Diva
61022	16:25	Diva	17:25	Vasai Road
61008	17:55	Diva	18:55	Vasai Road
61026	18:05	Pen	19:40	Diva
69161	19:05	Panvel	22:30	Dahanu Road

Down services
Train No.	Departure	Origin	Arrival	Destination
69164	5:25	Dahanu Road	8:55	Panvel
61001/3	8:35	Boisar	10:50	Diva
61011	8:45	Diva	11:05	Roha
61017	9:10	Diva	9:50	Panvel
61023	9:40	Diva	11:15	Pen
61019	11:20	Diva	12:55	Pen
69168	12:10	Vasai Road	13:45	Panvel
61005	12:55	Vasai Road	13:55	Diva
61007	15:35	Vasai Road	16:35	Diva
69166	16:40	Vasai Road	18:25	Panvel
61021	17:35	Vasai Road	18:35	Diva
61015	18:45	Diva	21:20	Roha
61009	19:15	Vasai Road	20:07	Diva
61025	19:50	Diva	21:20	Pen
61013	20:00	Diva	22:30	Roha

== See also ==
- Mumbai Suburban Railway
- Western Railway
- List of Mumbai Suburban Railway stations
- Central Railway
