= Khandeshwar =

Node in Navi Mumbai, Maharashtra, India

Khandeshwar is one of the recently developed nodes of Navi Mumbai and is located in Raigad district. It has a railway station on the harbour line of the Mumbai suburban railway network. It is also connected by the Navi Mumbai Metro. Khandeshwar is a rapidly developing city. Government is making the second International Airport in Mumbai Metropolitan Region and first in Navi Mumbai and trying to connect this airport to Chhatrapati Shivaji Maharaj International Airport that is Terminal 2 by metro rail.

Khandeshwar also has a temple of God Shiva. Devotees from many places come here for the fair on Maha Shivaratri.
