= Mansarovar railway station =

Railway station in Navi Mumbai, Maharashtra, India

Mansarovar

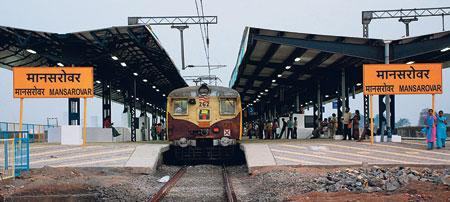

General information
- Coordinates: 19.016317°N 73.080883°E
- System: Mumbai Suburban Railway station
- Owner: Ministry of Railways, Indian Railways
- Line: Harbour Line
- Platforms: 2
- Tracks: 2

Construction
- Structure type: Standard on-ground station

Other information
- Status: Active
- Station code: MANR
- Fare zone: Central Railways

History
- Opened: 28 March 2008

Services
Preceding station	Mumbai Suburban Railway	Following station
Kharghar towards Chhatrapati Shivaji Terminus	Harbour line	Khandeshwar towards Panvel
Kharghar towards Thane	Trans-Harbour line	Khandeshwar towards Panvel
Route map
Location
- Location within Mumbai

Mansarovar is a railway station on the Harbour Line of the Mumbai Suburban Railway network in Mansarovar.

It has 2 Platforms. PF 1 for the trains going towards Panvel and PF 2 for trains towards Thane/Goregaon/CSMT.

The City and Industrial Development Corporation (CIDCO) built a bus station in 2010.
