= Mansarovar, Navi Mumbai =

Mansarovar is one of the recently developed nodes of Navi Mumbai, and is also a Mansarovar railway station on the harbour line of the Mumbai Suburban Railway network.

This station is near to Kamothe. Kamothe is old name and now its new name is "Mansarovar" which is being developed by CIDCO, almost all constructions are residential and commercial. This area offers good connectivity with Navi Mumbai and Panvel.
