= Nidi Sohana =

- Town and union council
- Sovereign state: Pakistan
- Dependent territory: Azad Kashmir
- District: Kotli
- Tehsil: Khuiratta
- Union council: Sohana
- Time zone: UTC+5 (PST)

Nidi Sohana (also spelled Needi Sohana) is a union council in the Kotli District, Azad Kashmir. It lies 19 km from Khoiratta and is a union council of the Khoi Ratta Tehsil on LA Kotli 6, situated at the LOC and at the end of the Kotli Tehsil. It consists of Changa gahi, zerin dhara, bala dhara, banni, haripur, androoth, nidi, sohana, mianmora, baira kotehra, rajhdhani, phalni, hilan nawnian, pathan etc. Before partition, Nidi Sohana was part of the Rajori Tehsil in the Riyasi District. The Muthrani Post is in this union council and is the highest point in the Kotli District. Its peak is 4,500 feet (1,370 m) above sea level.

== Schools ==
The union council has 11 primary schools, five middle schools for boys and one for girls, and two high schools for boys and one for girls.

- Government Boys High School Rajdhani Sohana
- Government Boys High School Nidi Sohana
- Government Girls High School Nidi Sohana
- Government Boys Middle School Behara Kotera
- Government Girls Middle School Behara Kotera
- Government Girls Middle School Rajdhani Sohana
- Government Boys Middle School Mitthi Dhara
- Government Girls Middle School Mitthi Dhara

•Primary school Hillan Nawnian Ghulam Ahmed Raza khattana late.

== Main villages ==
The main villages are Nidi, Sohana, Rajdhani, Mithi Dara, Haripur, Bala Dara, Zerein Dara, Chanaga Gai, and Bera Kothara.bhaiyl, Hillan Nawnian Khattana Abad

== Main tribes ==
Most of the inhabitants of this union council (75%) are from the Gujjar tribe. Others are from the Rajput, Saadat Syed, Butt, Bhatti, and Mughal tribes.

== Khui Forest ==
The Khui Forest is located in the Nidi Sohana Union Council.
