= Mumbai railway division =

Mumbai railway division may refer to these divisions of the Indian Railways:

- Mumbai CR railway division, Central Railway zone
- Mumbai WR railway division, Western Railway zone
