= Khandeshwar railway station =

Railway Station in Maharashtra, India

Khandeshwar

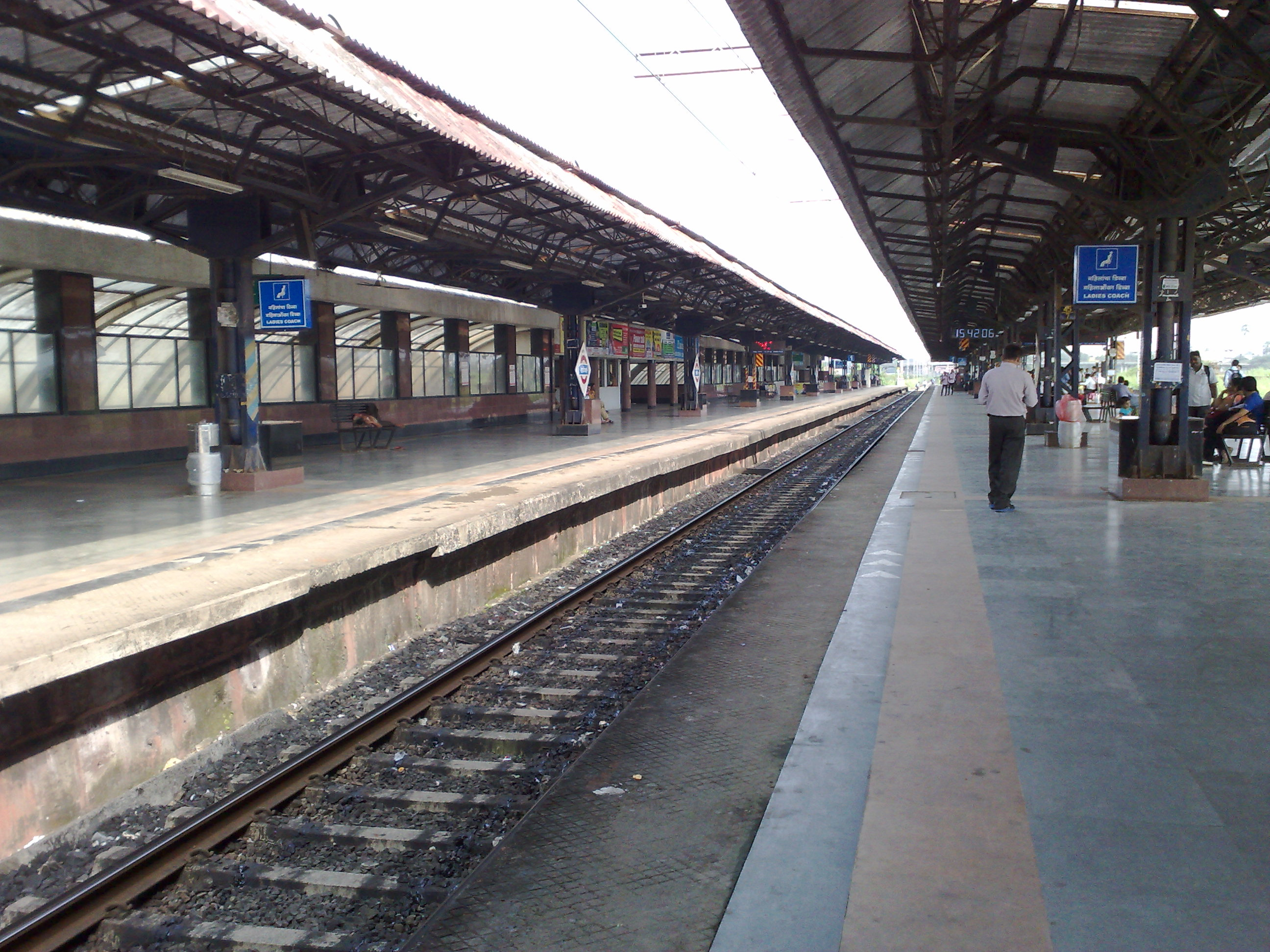

General information
- Coordinates: 19.007756°N 73.095087°E
- System: Mumbai Suburban Railway station
- Owner: Ministry of Railways, Indian Railways
- Line: Harbour Line
- Platforms: 2
- Tracks: 2

Construction
- Structure type: Standard on-ground station

Other information
- Status: Active
- Station code: KNDS
- Fare zone: Central Railways

Services
Preceding station	Mumbai Suburban Railway	Following station
Mansarovar towards Chhatrapati Shivaji Terminus	Harbour line	Panvel Terminus
Mansarovar towards Thane	Trans-Harbour line	Panvel Terminus
Route map
Location
- Location within Mumbai

Khandeshwar is a railway station on the Harbour Line of the Mumbai Suburban Railway network. In 2014, the City and Industrial Development Corporation (CIDCO) announced that it would set up an Inter State Bus Terminal on private-public participation at Khandeshwar Station. Khandeshwar railway station caters to New Panvel West but is built away from the city, while it is strategically near to Kamothe. The station derives its name from the Khandeshwar Mahadev Mandir and Khandeshwar Lake and Park. As Khandeshwar Railway station adjoins the nearer Kamothe node the people from Kamothe prefer Khandeshwar station over Manasarowar railway station which is cornered in the Juip Village.

It has 2 Platforms. PF 1 for the trains going towards Panvel and PF 2 for trains towards Thane/Goregaon/CSMT.

== Gallery ==
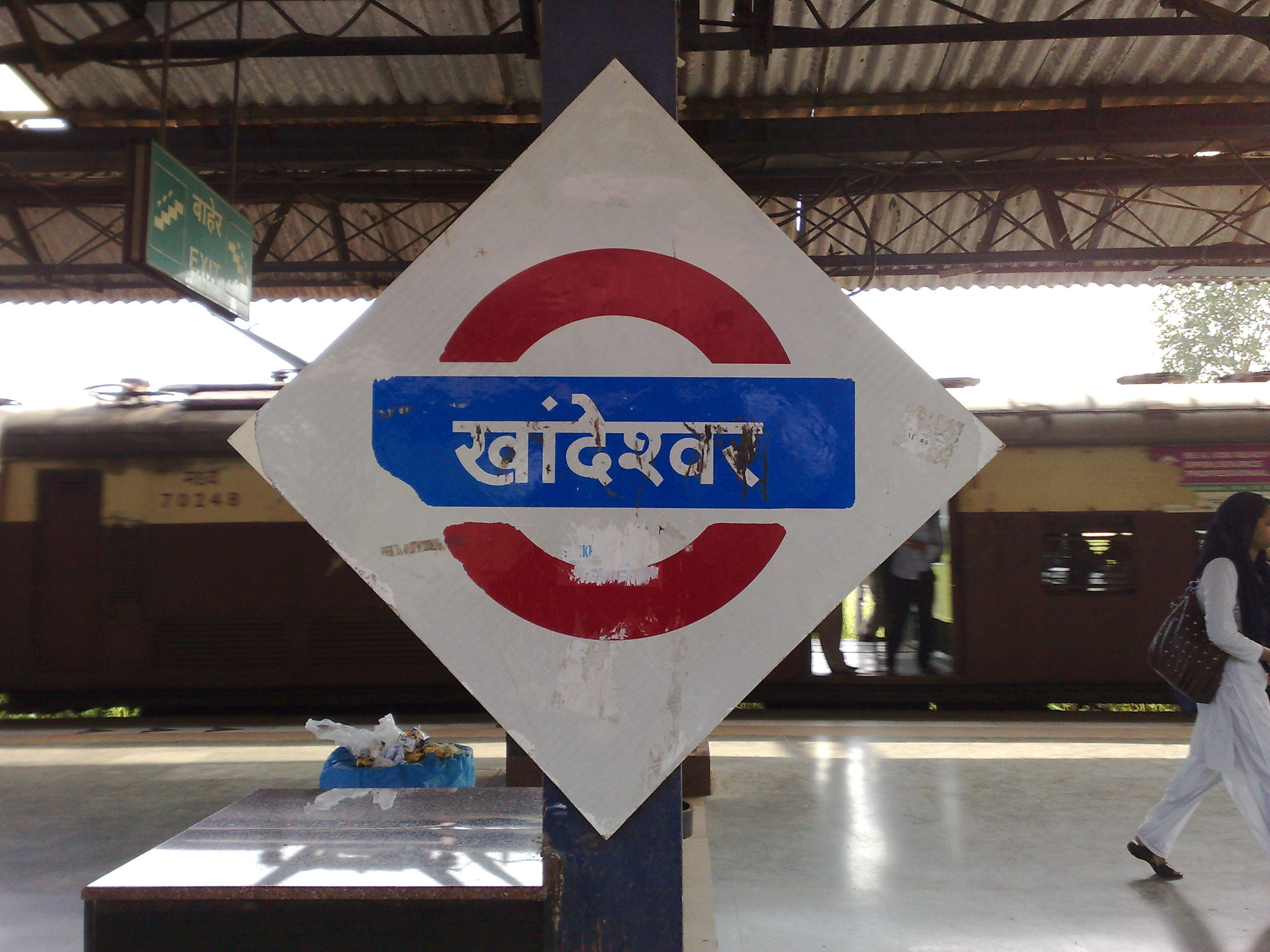
Khandeshwar Station – Platformboard

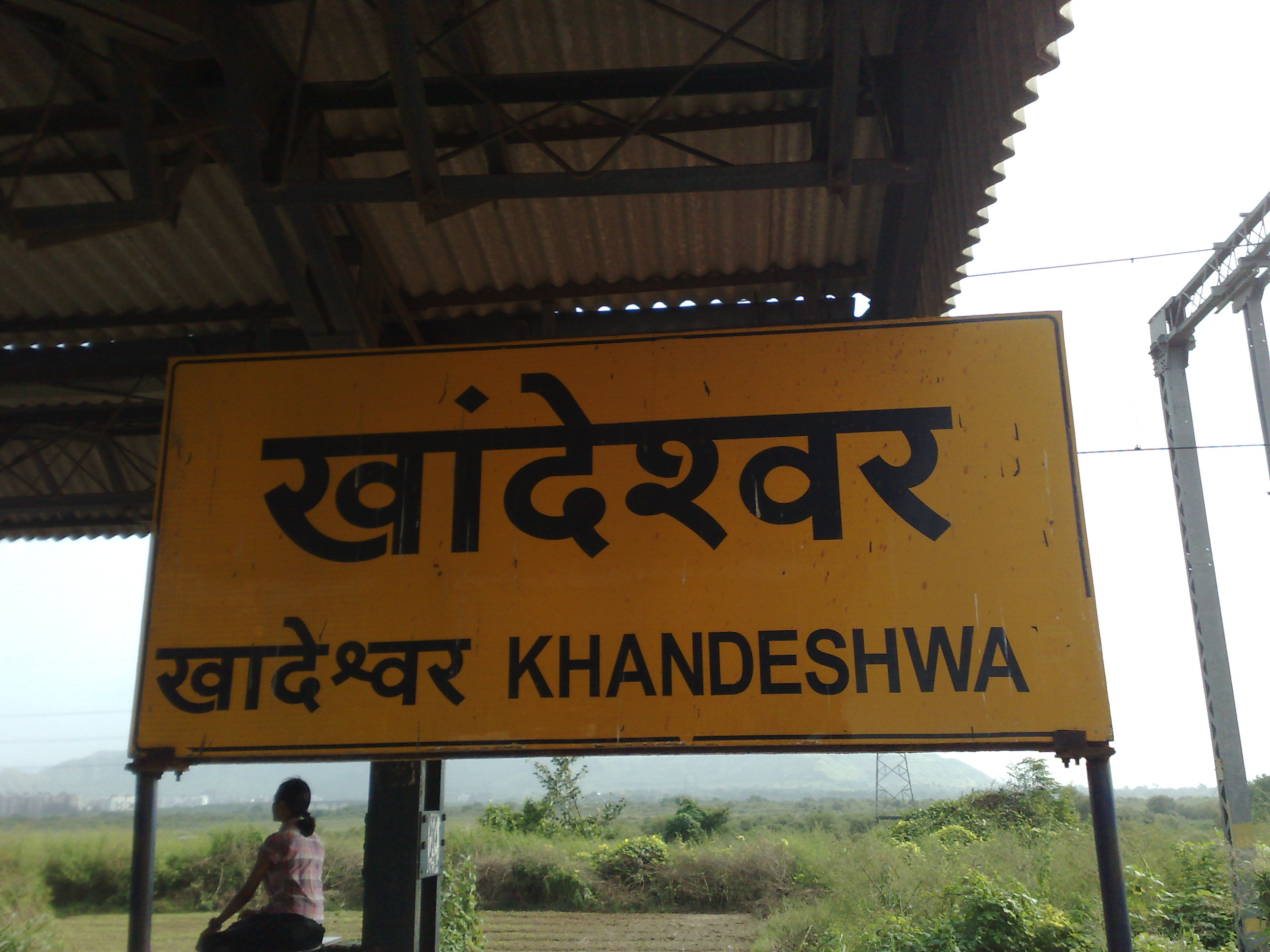
Khandeshwar Station – Stationboard
