= Diva Junction railway station =

Railway station in Maharashtra, India

Diva Junction दिवा जंक्शन
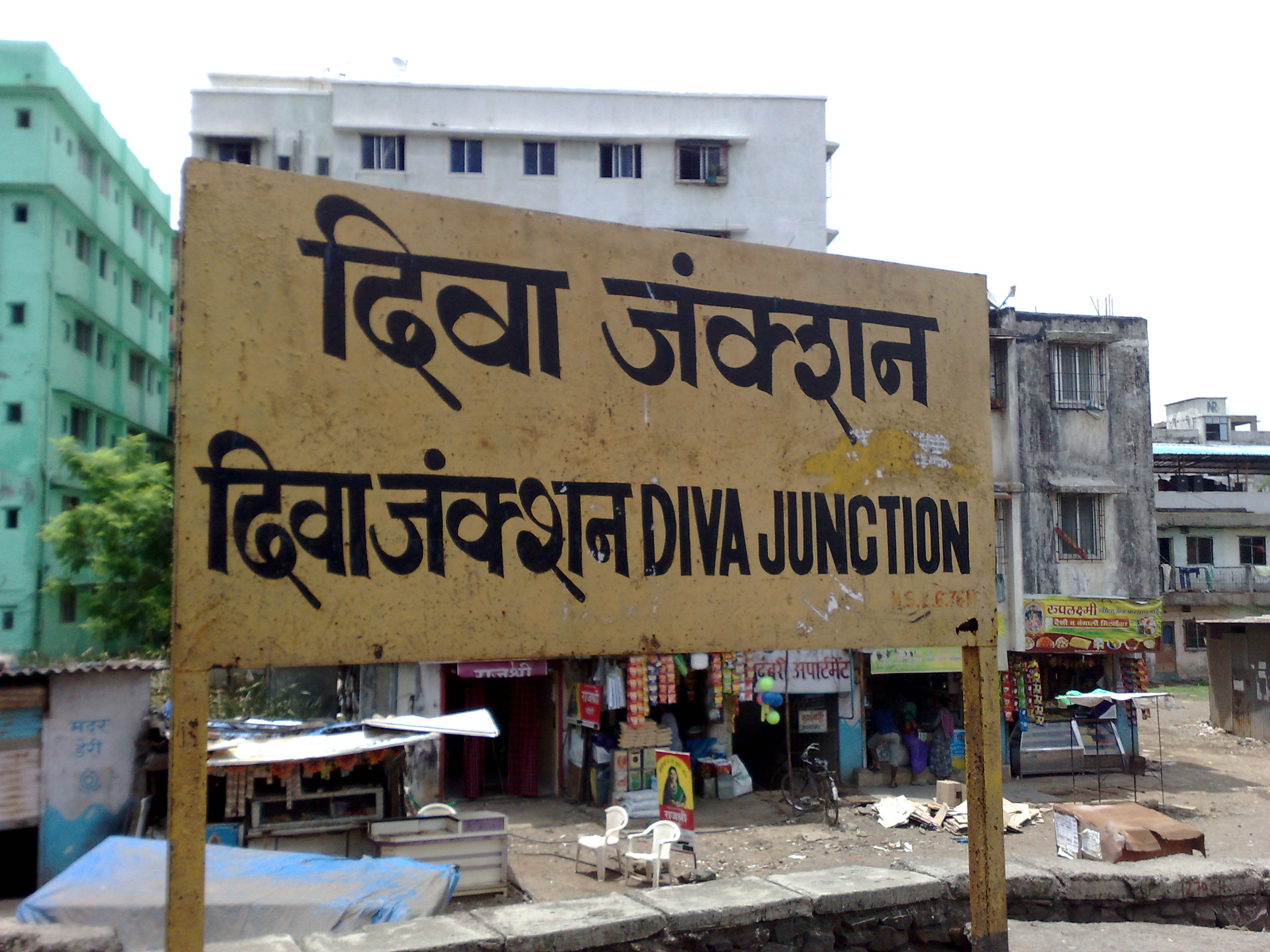

General information
- Location: Diva, Thane, Maharashtra
- Coordinates: 19.188993°N 73.043268°E
- Elevation: 6.760 metres (22.18 ft)
- System: Indian Railways and Mumbai Suburban Railway station
- Owner: Indian Railways
- Lines: Central Line & Vasai Road–Roha line
- Platforms: 8
- Tracks: 13 (Quadruple Electric-Line)

Construction
- Structure type: On ground
- Parking: Yes

Other information
- Status: Active
- Station code: DIVA
- Fare zone: Central Railway

History
- Opened: 3 April 1867
- Rebuilt: 2013

Passengers
- 2016–17: 95,691 (daily)

Services
| Preceding station | Mumbai Suburban Railway | Following station |
|---|---|---|
| Mumbra towards Chhatrapati Shivaji Terminus | Central line | Kopar towards Kasara or Khopoli |
| Kopar towards Vasai Road | Vasai Road–Roha line | Dativali towards Roha |
Route map
Location
- Location within Mumbai

Diva Junction railway station (station code: DIVA) is a junction between Mumbra and Kopar that is situated in Thane city, Maharashtra state, in India. It was opened on 3 April 1867.

Diva Junction railway station is an originating and terminating Railway Station for some of Konkan Railway zone trains namely Sindhudurg Passenger.
