= Roha railway station =

Railway Station in Maharashtra, India

Roha
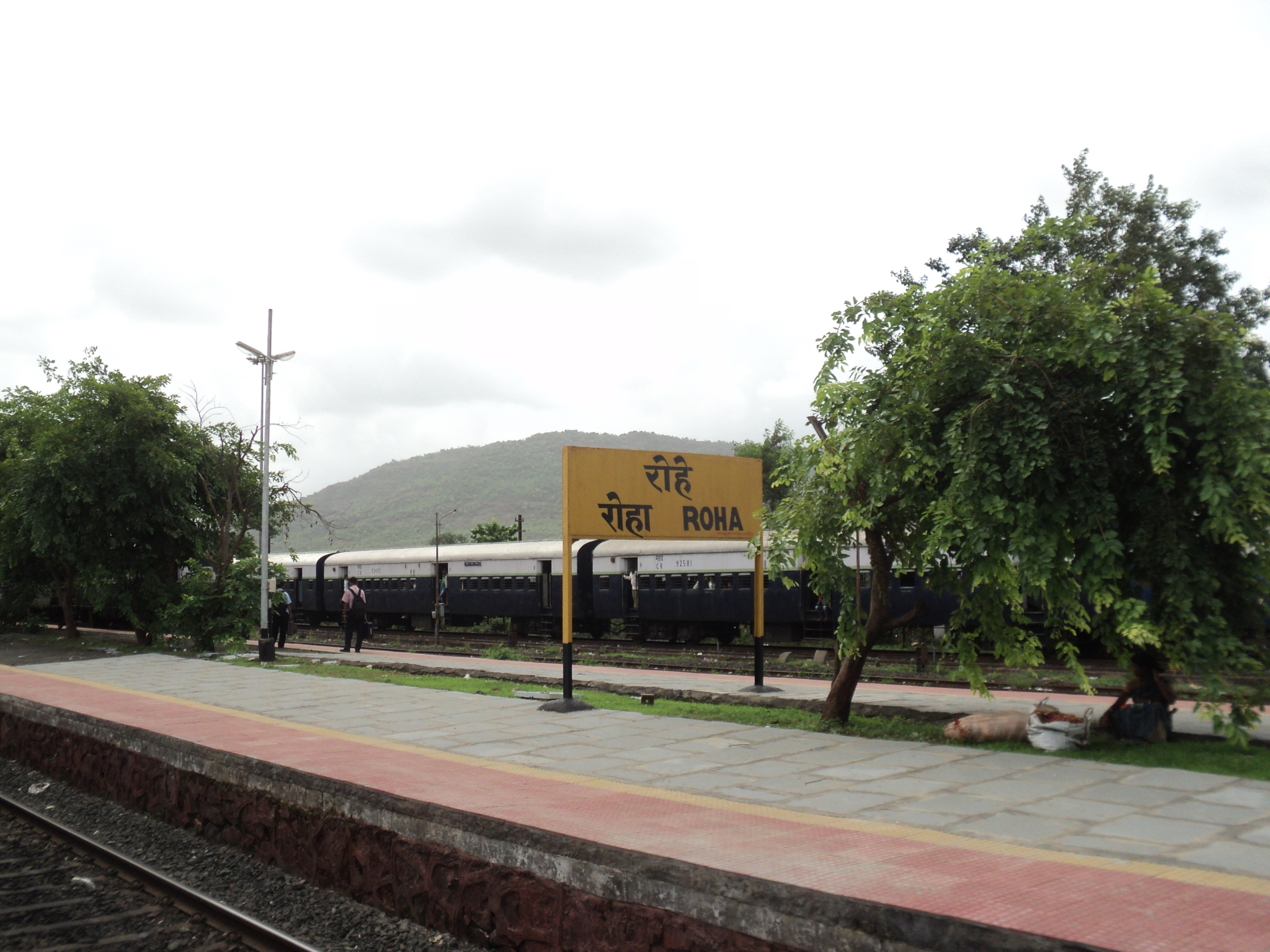
- Roha station platform

General information
- Location: Roha, Raigad district
- Coordinates: 18.4469°N 73.1239°E
- Elevation: 6.613 metres (21.70 ft)
- System: Regular Indian Railways Station
- Owner: Indian Railways
- Lines: Central railway Vasai Road–Roha line Roha–Thokur line
- Platforms: 3 (end platform)
- Tracks: 7

Construction
- Structure type: Standard on-ground station
- Parking: Yes

Other information
- Status: Active
- Station code: ROHA
- Fare zone: Central Railway

History
- Opened: 1986
- Electrified: Yes (2018)

Services
Preceding station	Mumbai Suburban Railway	Following station
Nidi towards Vasai Road	Vasai Road–Roha line	Terminus
Preceding station	Indian Railways	Following station
Terminus	Konkan Railway Konkan Railway	Kolad towards Thokur
Route map
Location
- Location within India Location within Maharashtra

Roha railway station (station code: ROHA) is the terminus railway station on the Vasai Road–Roha line of Central Railway in India. It is 143.61 km from Chhatrapati Shivaji Maharaj Terminus via Diva Junction. It belongs to the Mumbai division of Central Railway.

The station is situated in Raigad district of Maharashtra. Its preceding railway station is Nidi. The jurisdiction of Central Railway ends 1170 m down from Roha railway station. From that point, the jurisdiction of Konkan Railway Corporation Limited (KRCL) starts and ends down south at Thokur railway station in Karnataka (Karunadu) state traversing along west coast of India (Bharata). Roha Diva Memu originated & terminated from Roha Railway station operated by Central Railway zone (CR).
