= Vasai Road railway station =

Railway Station in Maharashtra, India

Vasai Road
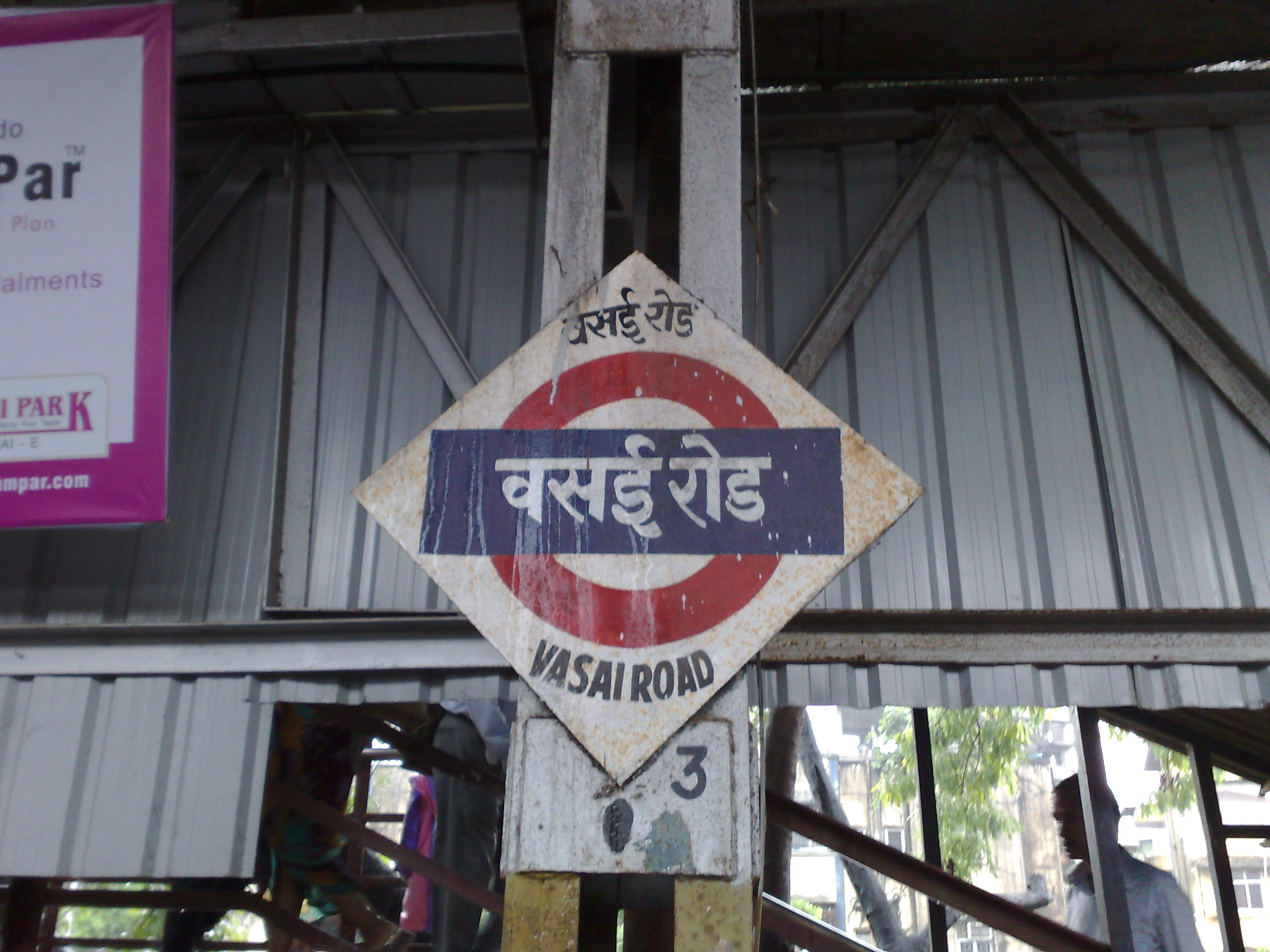

General information
- Location: Vasai
- Coordinates: 19.38238°N 72.83216°E
- System: Indian Railways and Mumbai Suburban Railway
- Owner: Ministry of Railways, Indian Railways
- Lines: Western line Vasai Road–Roha line
- Platforms: 7
- Tracks: 9

Construction
- Structure type: Standard on-ground station
- Parking: Yes
- Cycle facilities: Yes

Other information
- Status: Active
- Station code: BS (suburban); BSR (mainline)
- Fare zone: Western Railway zone

History
- Opened: in or before 1864

Passengers
- 2012-13: 2,15,296

Services
Preceding station	Mumbai Suburban Railway	Following station
Naigaon towards Churchgate	Western line	Nallasopara towards Dahanu Road
Terminus	Vasai Road–Roha line	Juchandra towards Roha
Route map
Location
- Location within Maharashtra

Vasai Road Junction (station code: BSR) is a railway station on the Western line and Vasai Road–Roha line of the Mumbai Suburban Railway network, in India.

Vasai is a historical suburban town north of Mumbai located in Palghar district. It is a much modern part of Vasai Taluka and part of the new Vasai-Virar city.

== History ==
The station was formerly known as Bassein Road (Bassein being Vasai's Portuguese name). This is the reason why the station code is BSR standing for the original Bassein Road.

It was a station on the erstwhile BB&CI railway's (today's Western Railway) first passenger train service between Grant Rd and Ahmedabad, when it commenced operations on 28 November 1864. It was also the northern terminus of the first local service of the BB&CI railway, when it started two coach services between Grant Rd and Bassein Rd on 1 November 1865. The service had one train plying each direction. Just the following month, in an effort to construct a second platform with roof at the station, Rs. 6,522 were sanctioned in December 1865. This was necessary, since it was often, that two passenger train happened to be at the station at the same time. Wells were provided at Bassein Rd, along with a station called Pahadee (today's Goregaon station).

== Gallery ==
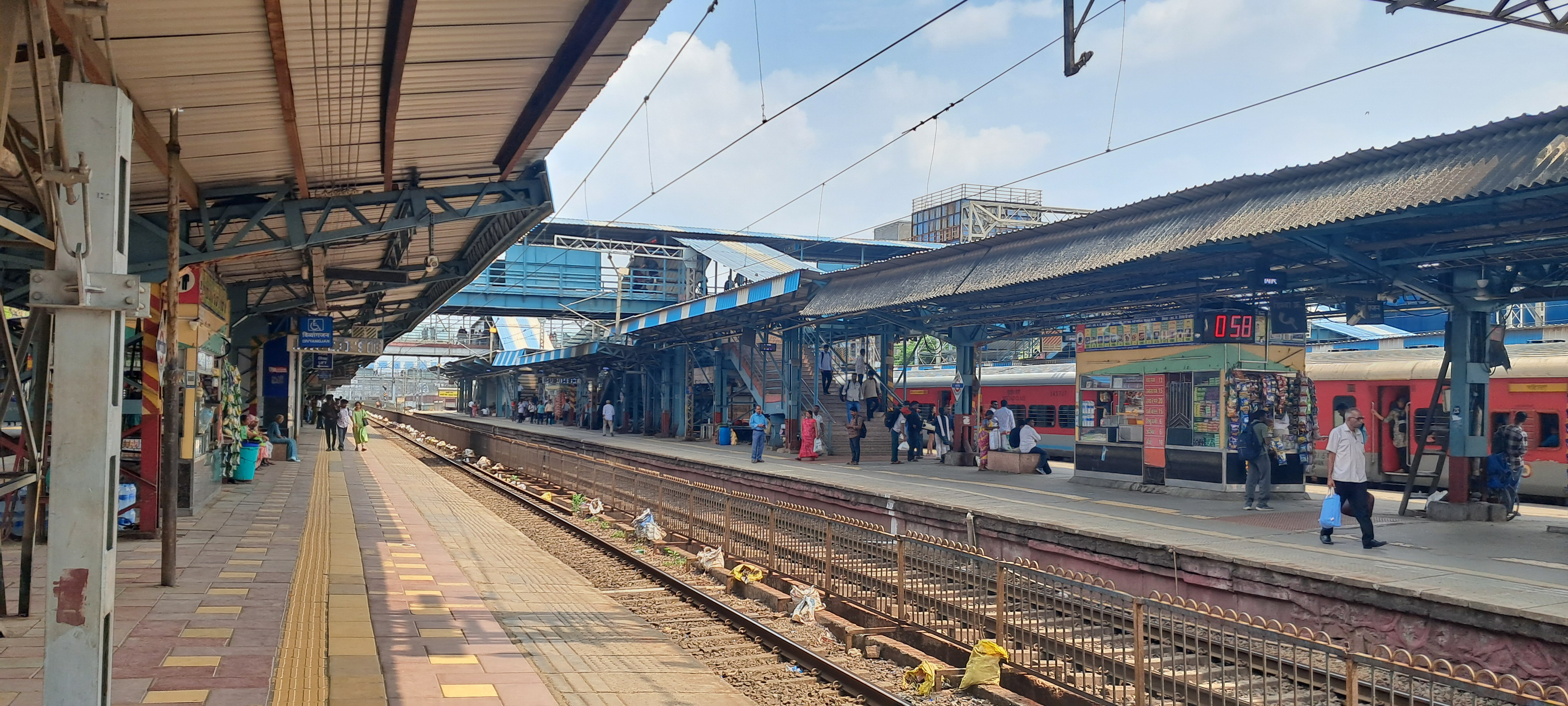
Northern view of Vasai Road stn platform

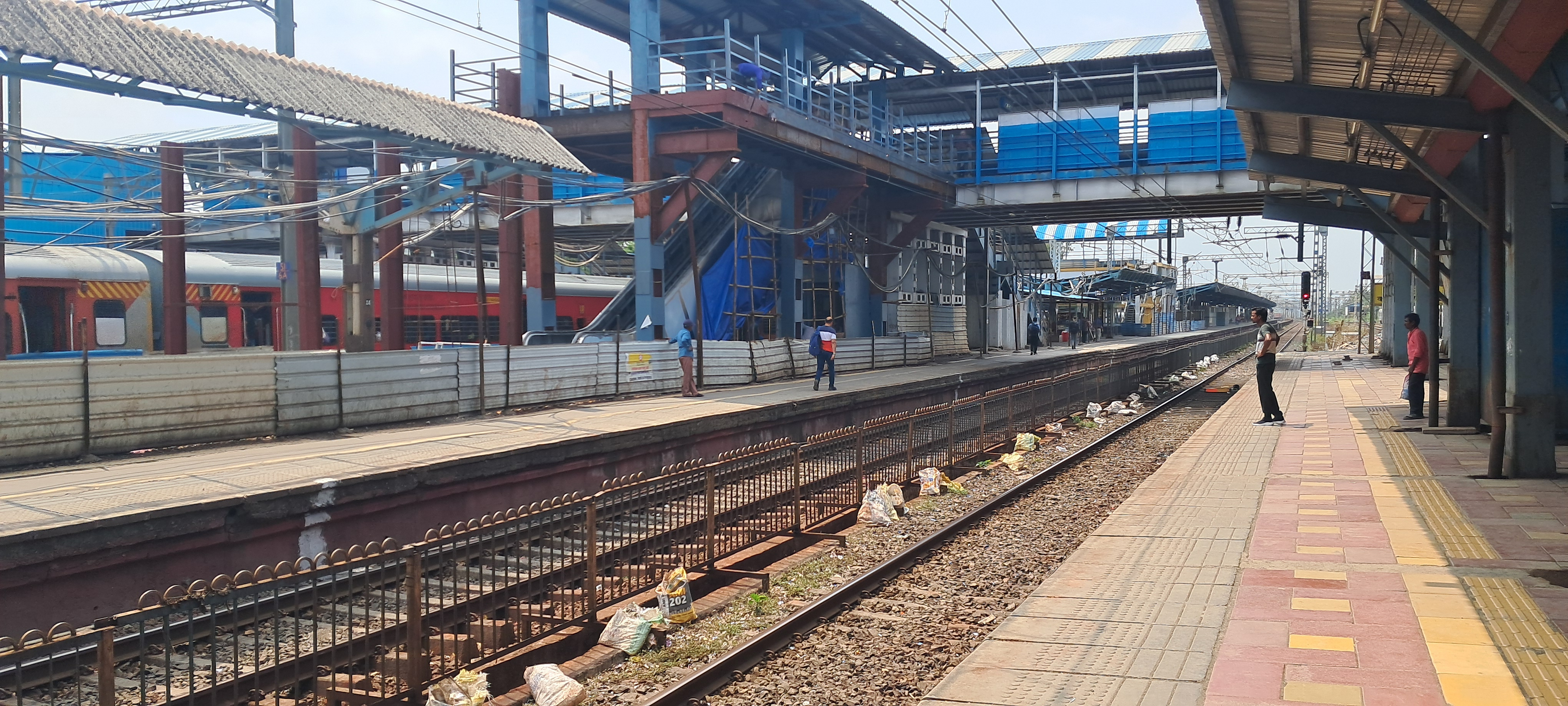
Southern view of Vasai Road stn platform

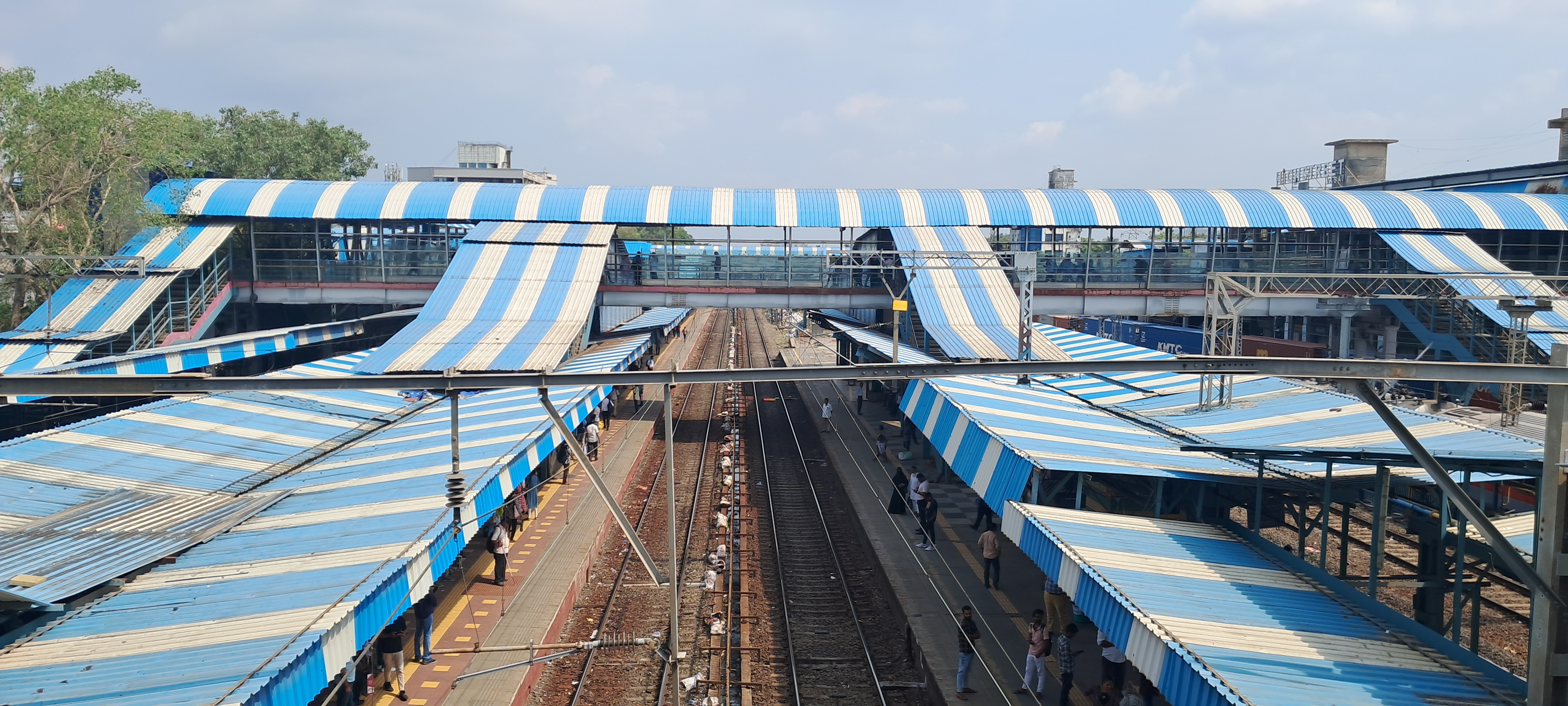
Northward View of Vasai Road station from FoB

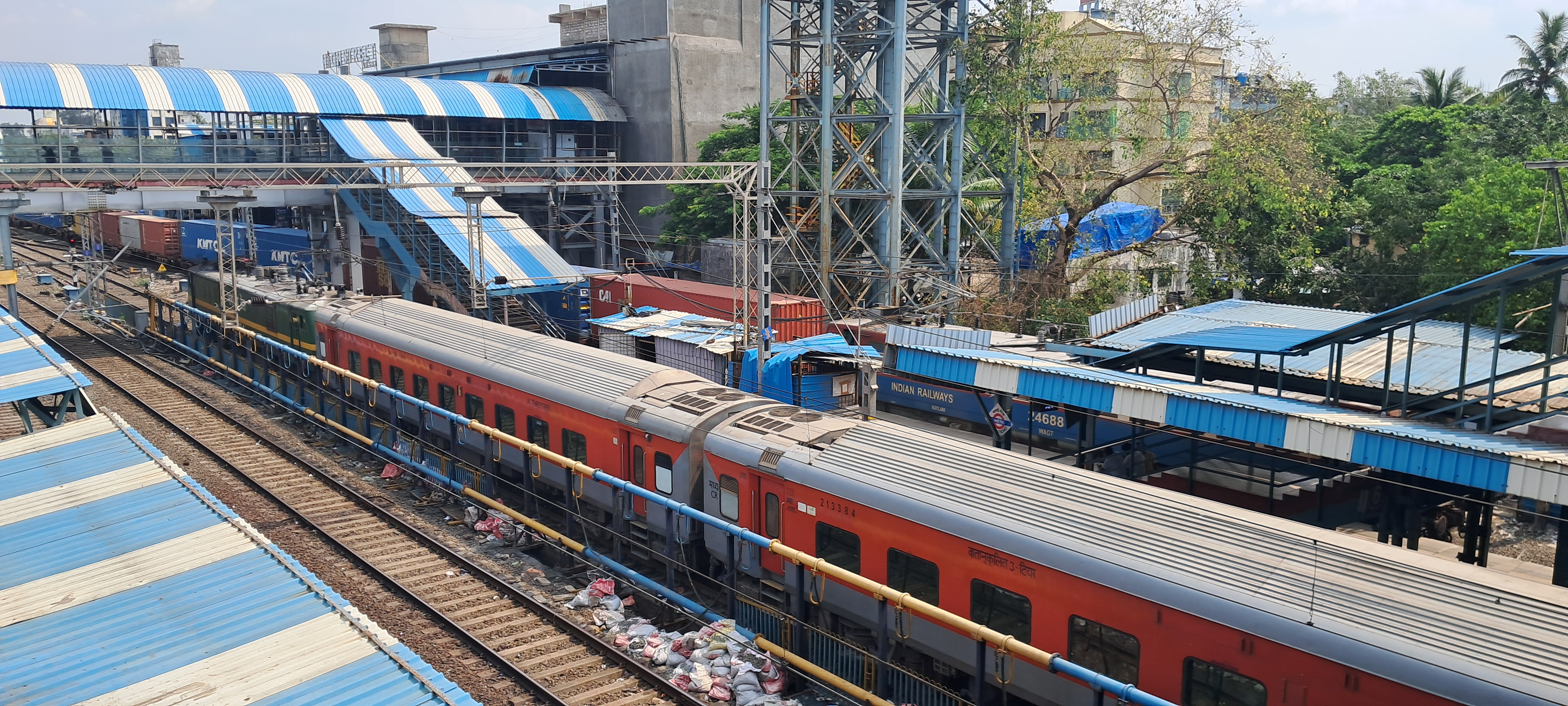
A long distance train at Vasai Road

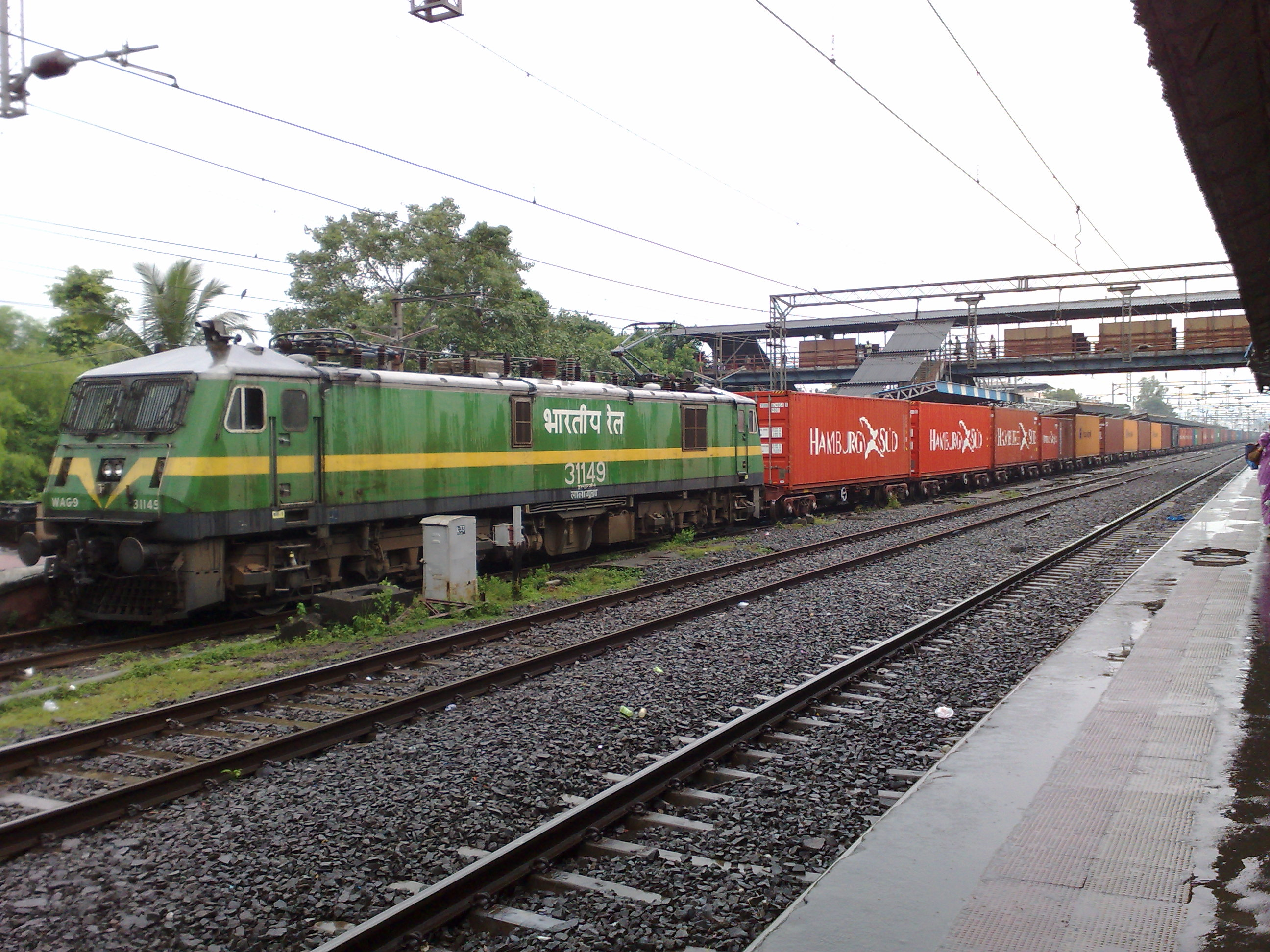
WAG-9 at Vasai Road Station – Platform 6

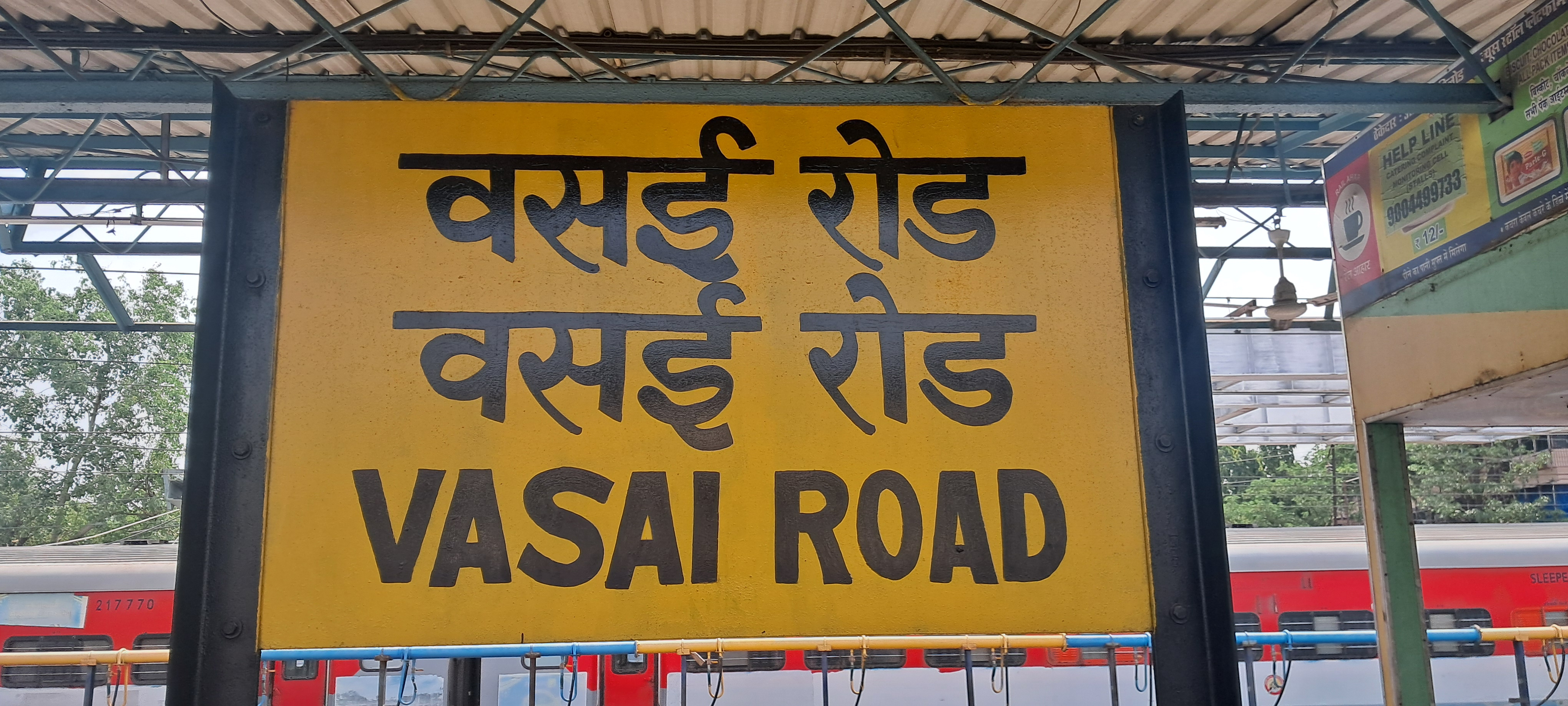
Vasai Road Stationboard

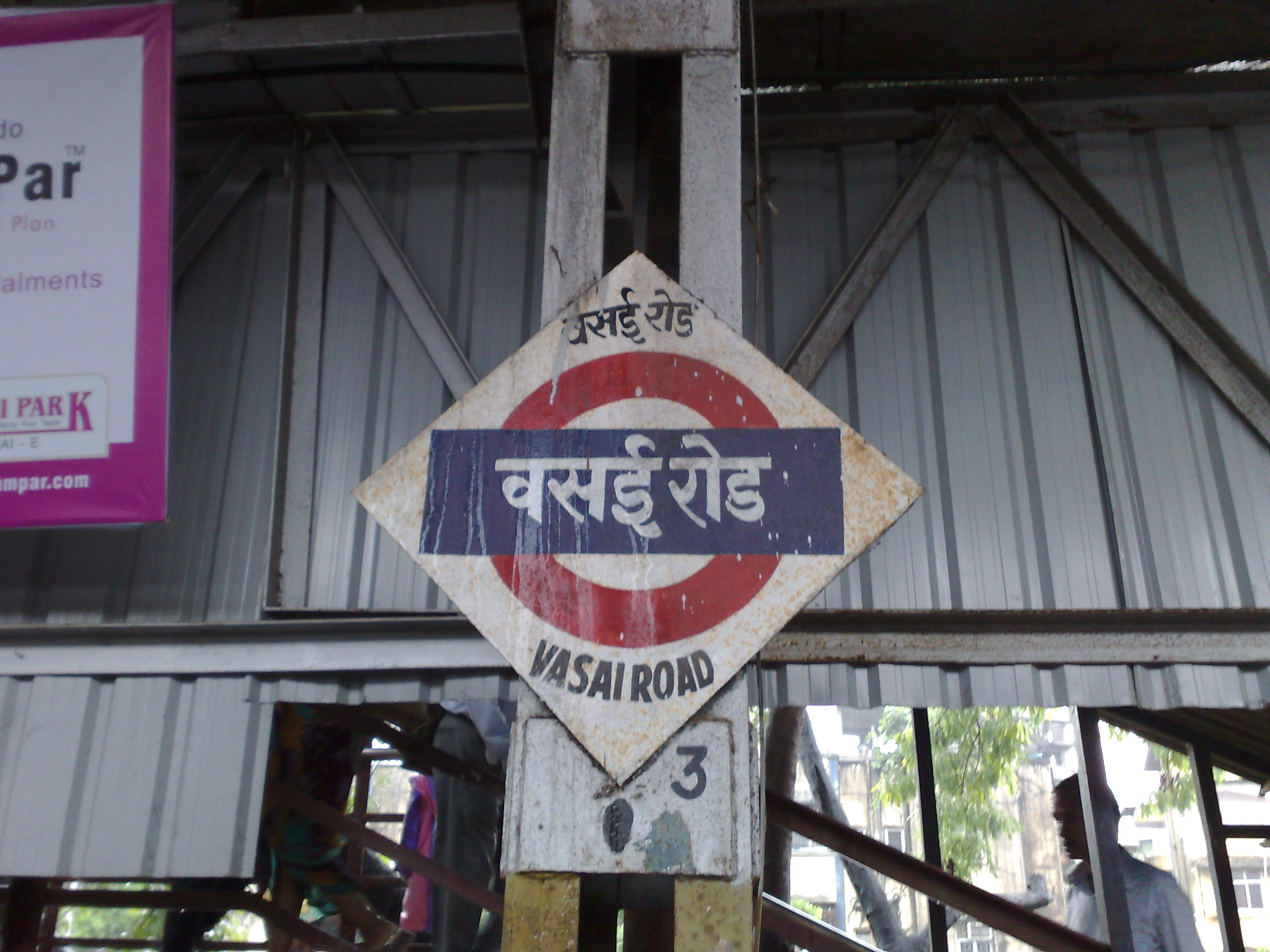
Vasai Road platform board
