= Panvel–Dahanu Road MEMU =

Indian MEMU passenger in Maharashtra

Overview
- Service type: Mainline Electrical Multiple Units
- Locale: Maharashtra
- Current operator: Western Railway zone

Route
- Termini: Panvel (PNVL); Dahanu Road (DRD)
- Stops: 19
- Distance travelled: 136 km (85 mi)
- Average journey time: 3h 25m
- Service frequency: Daily (Note: Runs seven days in a week for every direction.)
- Train number: 69161/69164

On-board services
- Class: General Unreserved
- Seating arrangements: Yes
- Sleeping arrangements: No
- Catering facilities: No
- Observation facilities: ICF coach
- Entertainment facilities: No
- Baggage facilities: Below the seats

Technical
- Rolling stock: 2
- Track gauge: 1,676 mm (5 ft 6 in)
- Electrification: Yes
- Operating speed: 41 km/h (25 mph) average with halts

Panvel–Dahanu Road MEMU is a Mainline Electrical Multiple Units train belonging to Western Railway zone that runs between Panvel and Dahanu Road in India. It is currently being operated with 69161/69164 train numbers on a daily basis.

== Service ==
- 69161/Panvel–Dahanu Road MEMU has an average speed of 41 km/h and covers 136 km in 3h 20m. The
- 69164/Dahanu Road–Panvel MEMU has an average speed of 40 km/h and covers 136 km in 3h 25m. There is rush between Kopar and Vasai Road.

== Route and halts ==
The important halts of the train are:

- Panvel
- Kalamboli
- Navde Road
- Taloje Panchnand
- Nilaje
- Dativali
- Kopar
- Bhiwandi Road
- Kharbao
- Kaman Road
- Juchandra
- Vasai Road
- Nallasopara
- Virar
- Vaitarna
- Saphale
- Kelve Road
- Palghar
- Umroli
- Boisar
- Vangaon
- Dahanu Road

== See also ==
- Vasai Road–Diva DEMU
- Panvel–Vasai Road MEMU
