= Panvel–Vasai Road MEMU =

Indian MEMU passenger in Maharashtra

Overview
- Service type: Mainline Electrical Multiple Units
- Locale: Maharashtra
- First service: 1 July 2011; 15 years ago
- Current operator: Central Railway zone

Route
- Termini: Panvel (PNVL); Vasai Road (BSR)
- Stops: 10
- Distance travelled: 63 km (39 mi)
- Average journey time: 1h 35m
- Service frequency: Daily (Note: Runs seven days in a week for every direction.)
- Train number: 69165/69166/69167/69168

On-board services
- Class: General Unreserved
- Seating arrangements: Yes
- Sleeping arrangements: No
- Catering facilities: No
- Observation facilities: ICF coach
- Entertainment facilities: No
- Baggage facilities: Above the seats

Technical
- Rolling stock: 2
- Track gauge: 1,676 mm (5 ft 6 in)
- Electrification: Yes
- Operating speed: 46 km/h (29 mph) average with halts

Panvel–Vasai Road MEMU is a Mainline Electrical Multiple Unit train belonging to Central Railway zone that runs between Panvel and Vasai Road in India. It is currently being operated with 69165/69166/69167/69168 train numbers on a daily basis.

== Service ==
- Panvel–Vasai Road MEMU has an average speed of 40 km/h and covers 63 km in 1h 35m.
- Vasai Road–Panvel MEMU has an average speed of 40 km/h and covers 63 km in 1h 35m.

== Route and halts ==
The important halts of the train are:

- Panvel
- Kalamboli
- Navde Road
- Taloje Panchnand
- Nilaje
- Dativali
- Kopar
- Bhiwandi Road
- Kharbao
- Kaman Road
- Juchandra
- Vasai Road

== See also ==
- Vasai Road–Diva DEMU
- Panvel–Dahanu Road MEMU
