= Vasai Road–Diva DEMU =

Indian DEMU Passenger in Maharashtra

Overview
- Service type: DEMU
- Locale: Maharashtra
- First service: 1 July 2011; 15 years ago
- Current operator: Central Railway zone

Route
- Termini: Vasai Road (BSR); Diva Junction (DIVA)
- Stops: 5
- Distance travelled: 40 km (25 mi)
- Average journey time: 0h 52m
- Service frequency: Daily (Note: Runs seven days in a week for every direction.)
- Train number: 71083/71084/71085/71086/71093/71094

On-board services
- Class: General unreserved
- Seating arrangements: Yes
- Sleeping arrangements: No
- Catering facilities: No
- Observation facilities: ICF coach
- Entertainment facilities: No
- Baggage facilities: Below the seats

Technical
- Rolling stock: 2
- Track gauge: 1,676 mm (5 ft 6 in)
- Electrification: Yes
- Operating speed: 46 km/h (29 mph) average with halts

Vasai Road–Diva DEMU is a DEMU train belonging to Central Railway zone that runs between Vasai Road and Diva Junction in India. It is currently being operated with 71083/71084/71085/71086/71093/71094 train numbers on a daily basis.

== Service ==
- The Vasai Road–Diva DEMU has an average speed of 46 km/h and covers 40 km in 52m.
- The Diva–Vasai Road DEMU has an average speed of 40 km/h and covers 40 km in 1h.

== Route and halts ==
The important halts of the train are:

- Vasai Road
- Juchandra
- Kaman Road
- Kharbav
- Bhiwandi Road
- Kopar
- Diva Junction

== See also ==
- Panvel–Vasai Road MEMU
- Panvel–Dahanu Road MEMU
