= Chandika Devi Temple, Juchandra =

Hindu temple

Chandika Devi Temple
- चंडिका देवी मंदिर
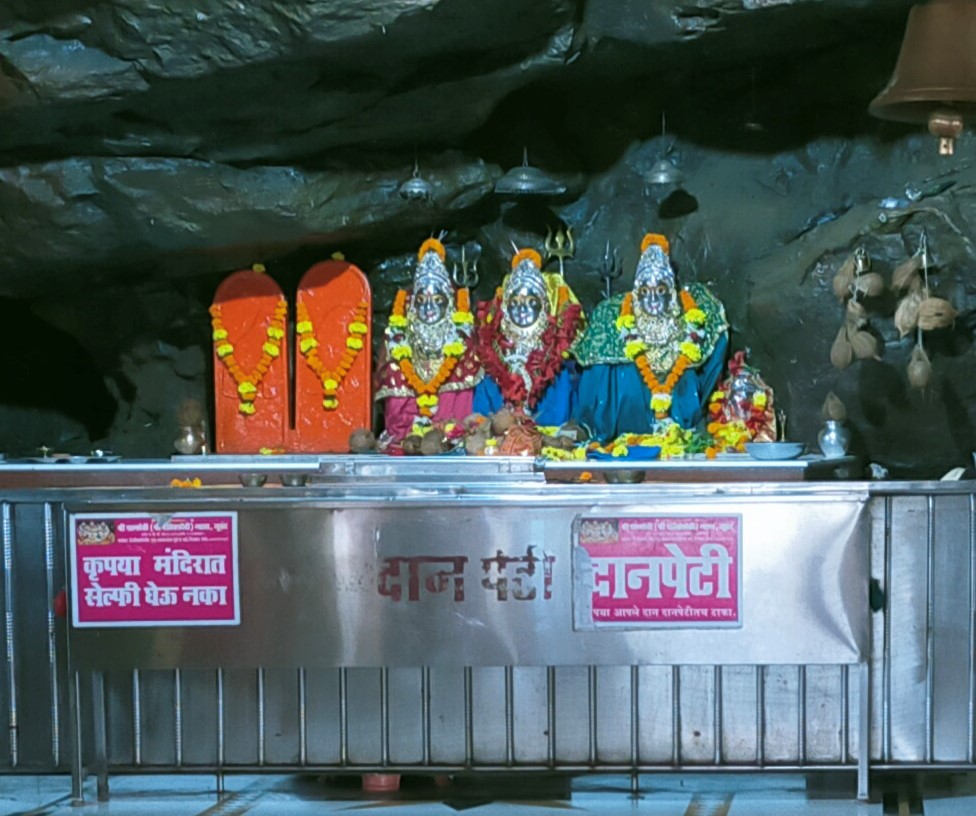
- The main deities in Chandika Devi Mandir

Religion
- Affiliation: Hinduism
- District: Thane
- Deity: Chandika Mata
- Festival: Navratri
- Status: Active

Location
- Location: Juchandra village
- State: Maharashtra
- Country: India
- Interactive map of Chandika Devi Temple
- Coordinates: 19°21′37″N 72°52′54″E

Chandika Devi Temple is a Hindu temple in Juchandra village, near Vasai and Naigaon, situated on a hill 400 feet above sea level. It is dedicated to the mother goddess Chandika.

== History ==
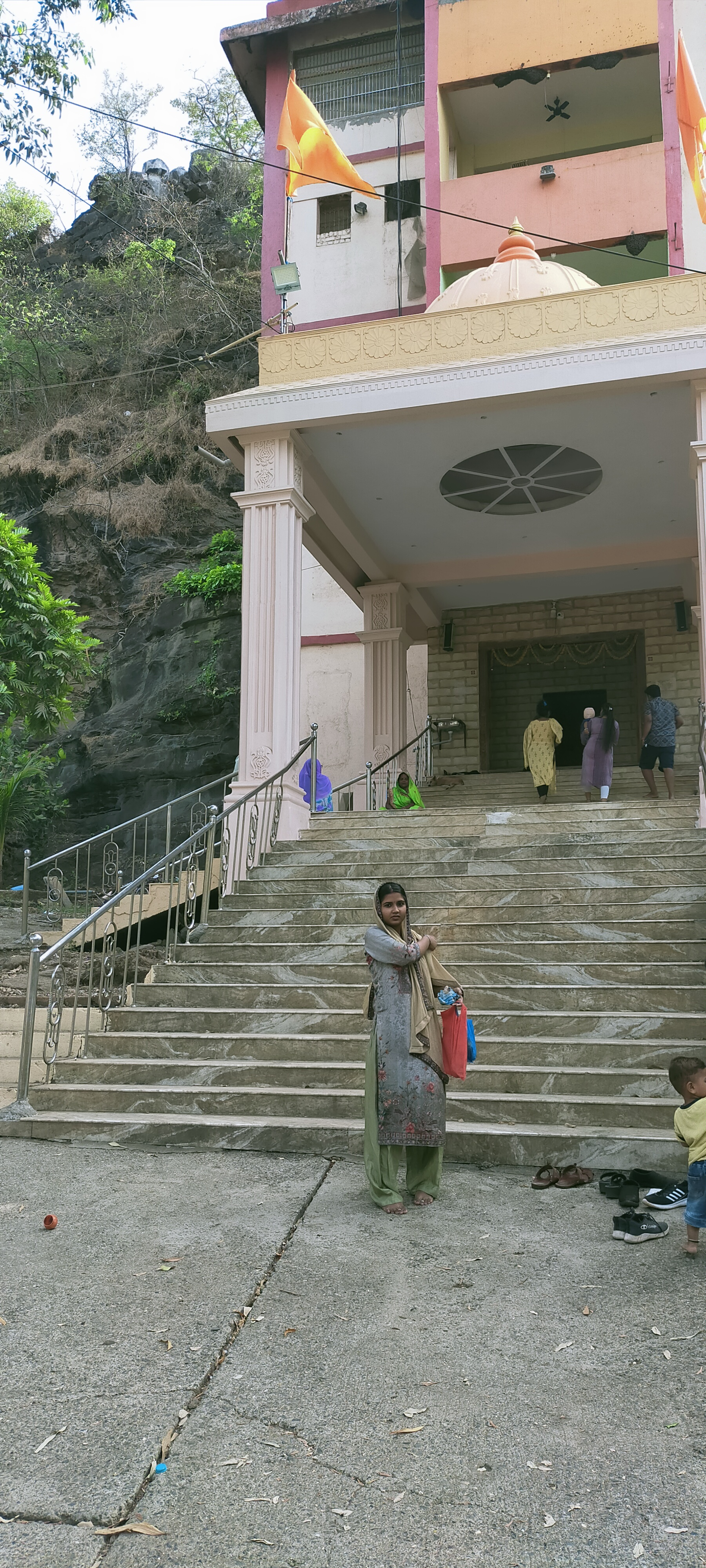
The entrance of Chandika Devi Temple

According to local beliefs, this temple dates back to the Pandavas period. But there is no document to support the claim. There are stone idols of Chandika, Kalika, Mahishasuramardini and Ganesha in this ancient temple which is situated in a huge rock cave. According to local churches, in 2018, there was no footpath to reach the mountain 60 or 70 years ago.

The temple was renovated in 2002 while constructing a five-story building for the convenience of the devotees. A lift facility has been provided for senior citizens and physically disabled people. The mother goddess Chandika is Kuladevi of Junchandra village. It is also said that stones were taken from here to build the Vasai Fort.

== Festival ==
Chandika Devi Temple also conducts various social and cultural activities every year. Navaratri, which falls in the month of Ashvin and Chaitra as per Hindu calendar every year, is celebrated with great enthusiasm and devotion. In the month of Chaitra, a large Yatra takes place.

In 2020, a 115-year-old drama tradition of the temple was canceled due to the COVID-19 pandemic and restrictions imposed by the government. Dutt Prasadik Bavanchal Natya Mandal has been performing various plays for the last 115 years. In 2021, Chandika Mata Yatra was canceled due to the second wave of COVID-19.

== Accessibility ==
There are steps to reach the hill from the west of the temple and it takes about two hundred steps to climb. There is a road directly to the temple on one side of the hill to go up by car or your private vehicle. To reach the temple, one can either reach from Vasai Road railway station or get off at Juchandra railway station on the Thane Vasai-Diva route and can reach the hill by walking for a few minutes. One can reach Chandika Devi Temple in Juchandra village by getting off the Naigaon railway station on Mumbai's Western side of the railway line and taking a rickshaw after reaching Vasai.
