= Naigaon =

- City
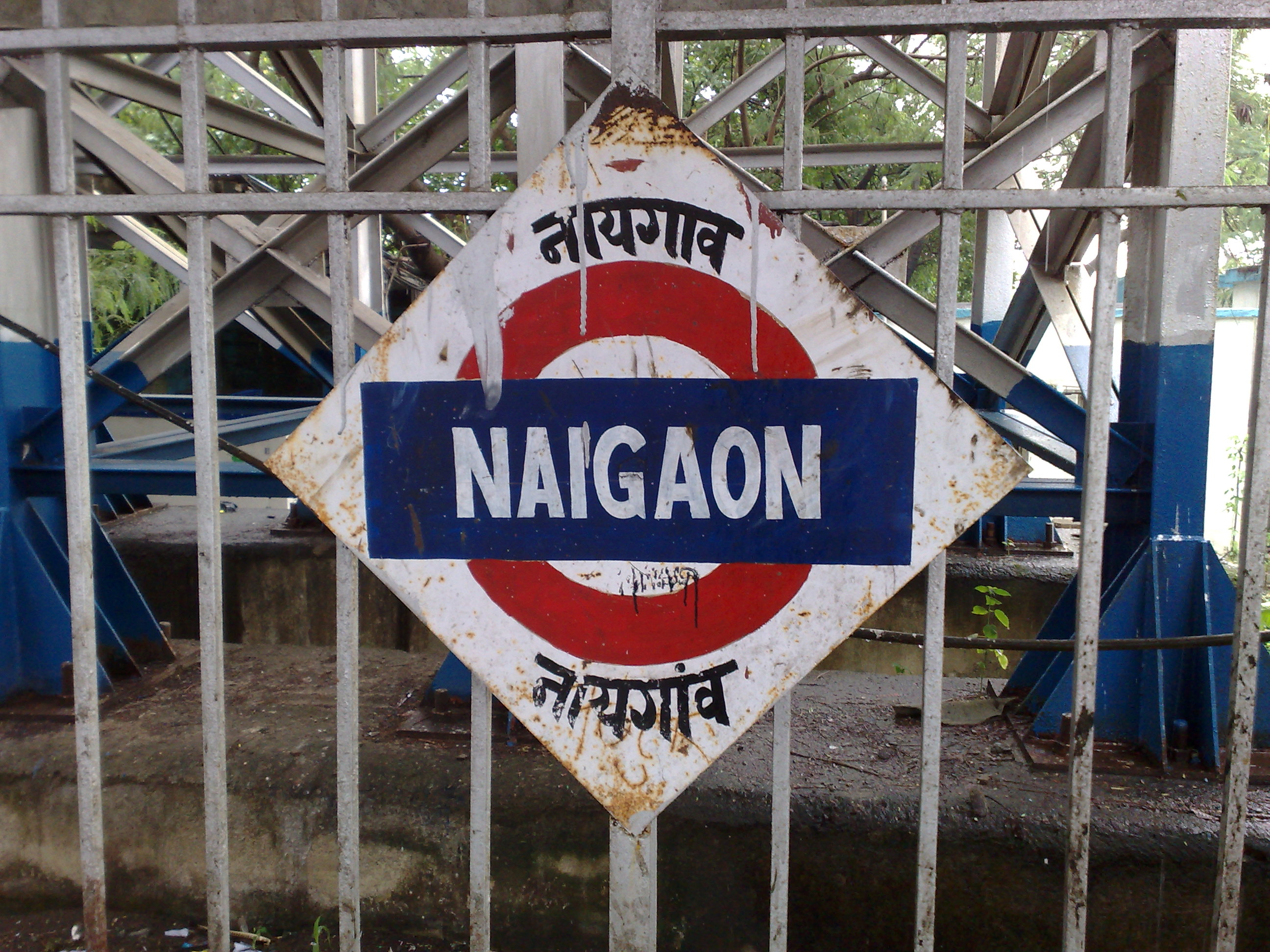
- Naigaon railway station sign in Palghar district, Maharashtra, India

- Location within Maharashtra
- Coordinates: 19.351467°N 72.846343°E
- Country: India
- State: Maharashtra
- District: Palghar

Government
  - Type: Municipal Corporation
  - Body: Vasai-Virar Municipal Corporation
  - Mayor: Mrs. Pravina Thakur (BVA)
- Elevation: 5 m (16 ft)
- Time zone: UTC+5:30 (IST)
- PIN: Naigaon (West) - 401201, 401202, 401207 Naigaon (East) - 401208
- Telephone code: (91) 0250
- Vehicle registration: MH 48 - Palghar
- Lok Sabha Constituency: Palghar
- Website: vvcmc.in

Naigaon is a City in Palghar district of Indian State of Maharashtra, part of Mumbai Region. It is linked to the National Highway by the Eastern side of Naigaon. But the Naigaon East-West Flyover or Naigaon Flyover provides easy accessibility to the Western side of Naigaon as well from the National Highway.

Naigaon is part of Western, Central & Harbour Railway. On Western Railway, Naigaon is connected with Naigaon Railway Station whereas on Central Railway / Harbour Railway it is connected with Juchandra Road & Kaman Road Railway Stations.

Naigaon Railway Station is located between Bhayandar to the South & Vasai Road to the North on Western Line. On the Central Line, Juchandra Road Railway Station (Naigaon East) is situated between Kaman Road to the South & Vasai Road to the North, with Kaman Road Railway Station (Naigaon East) situated between Kharbav to the South & Juchandra Road to the North.

== Transport ==
Naigaon West - Rickshaws and Vasai Virar Municipal Transport (VVMT) Bus services are available near Naigaon West Station area. Bus Number 117 operates from Naigaon Station West to Vasai Court Tehsil Office.

Naigaon East - Rickshaws and Vasai Virar Municipal Transport (VVMT) Bus services are available too near Naigaon East Station area. Bus Routes & Bus Numbers are as under :-

Bus Number 122 operates from Naigaon Station East to Naigaon Phata.

Bus Number 123 operates from Naigaon Station East to Bhoidapada Naka.

Bus Number 134 operates from Naigaon Station East to Pavitradham.

Bus Number 137 operates from Naigaon Station East to Chinchoti.

== References / Tourist Places ==
Chinchoti Waterfalls in Naigaon East.

Netaji Lake in Naigaon East.

Killabunder Fort / Vasai Fort in Naigaon West.
