= Shiv Mandir, Maharashtra =

Religion
- Affiliation: Hinduism
- District: Palghar
- Deity: Lord Shiva

Location
- Location: Vangaon village
- State: Maharashtra
- Country: India

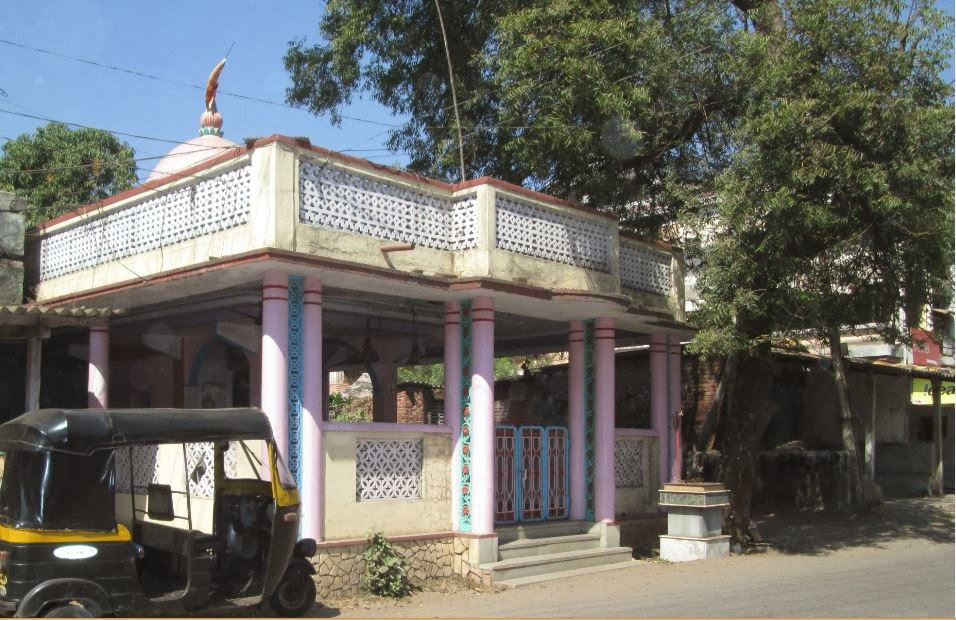

The Shiv Mandir, Maharashtra is a temple located in Vangaon village in the Palghar district of Maharashtra, India. A long history associated with divine religious destinations is captured in the architecture of the outer building. It is situated at 100 m from Railway station of Vangaon, 130 km away from Mumbai and 60 km away from Vapi. The divine Shiva Linga situated inside the main building is associated with many traditional stories and is considered to be swayambhu (prayed since ancient times).

Local people describe about long prevailing ancient stories associated with the Shiva Linga situated in the Garbhgruah of the temple.

The temple becomes overcrowded during many occasions like Mahashivratri—during which is a fair and in the month of Shravan. Pilgrims come to get blessings from Shiv Pooja like Rudrabhishek, Parthiv Ling Pooja, Akhand Ramayan Path, Nava Parayan (ramcharitmanas), Masparayan (Ramcharitmanas) and other religious events.

== Transport ==
Shiv Mandir is located in Vangaon, 55 km north of Virar on the western railway lines of Mumbai Suburban Railway Network and also in walking distance from Vangaon railway Station to the west.

== History ==
Shiv Mandir, Vangaon has existed since ancient times. The only structures that existed were the Shiva Linga which the local people prayed to even before the temple building was constructed. The temple building was reestablished by the Thakur family and other local families of Vangaon in 19th century. Many stories, which are associated and narrated by old tribal peoples to their families, describe the Shiv Ling and the temple.

== Temple ==
Shiv Mandir is the main attraction in Palghar District. According to tribal ancestral stories, the shiv ling was formed at the time of Treta Yuga, when Lord Shiva transformed himself to the form of madari to take Hanuman to meet Lord Ram in his childhood. The shiva linga was then observed by an old Brahmin and was prayed and preached by his family. Long held belief holds the divine Shiva Linga situated in temple fulfills desired wishes.
