= Kopar, Thane =

Kopar (Marathi: कोपर) is a town in neighbourhood in Dombivli. It is connected with the Mumbai Metropolitan Region by the Mumbai Suburban Railway. It is served by Kopar railway station on the Central Line.
