= Vangaon railway station =

Railway station in Maharashtra, India

Vangaon

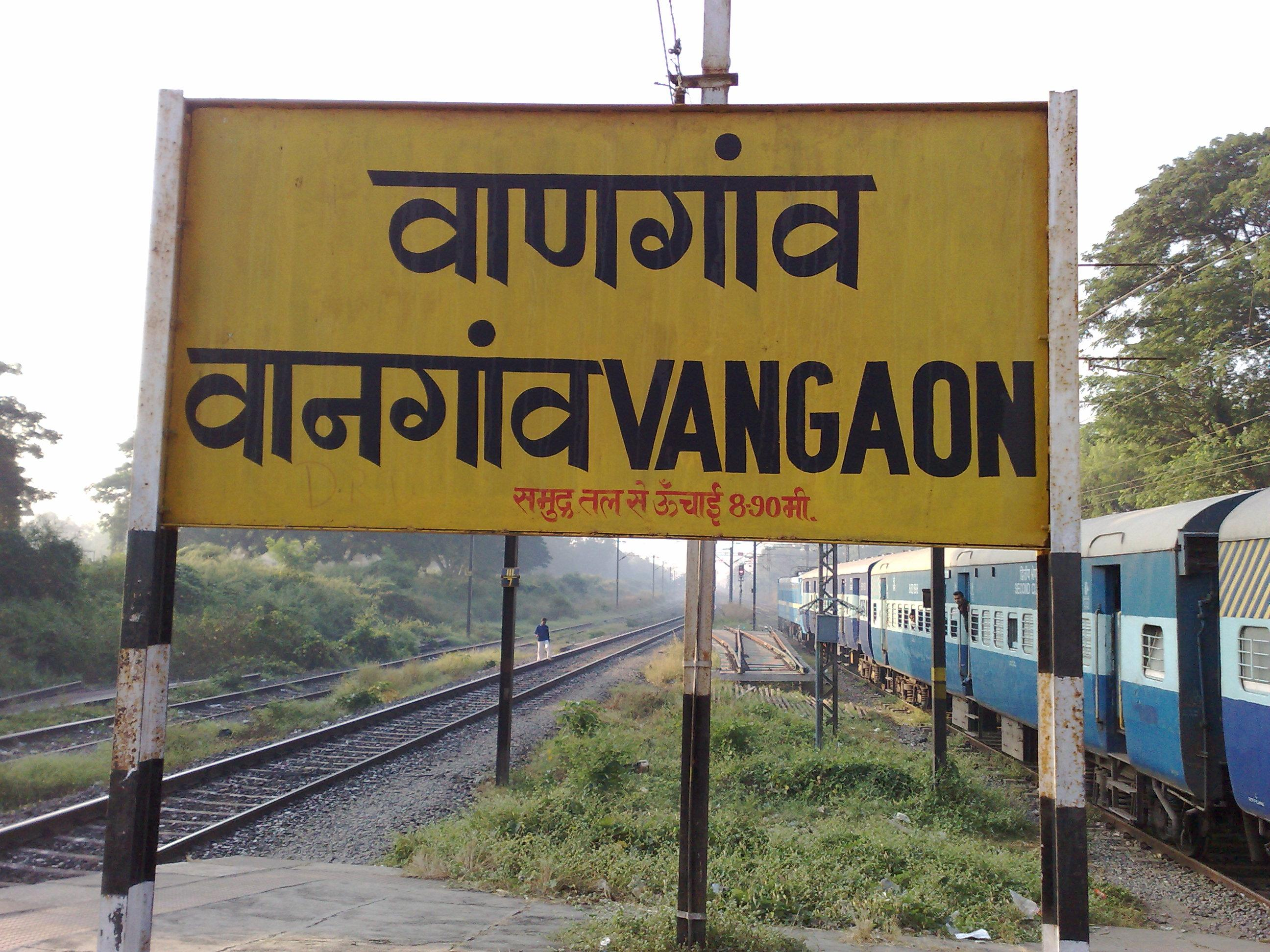

General information
- Location: Vangaon
- Coordinates: 19.866667°N 72.75°E
- Elevation: 8.900 metres (29.20 ft)
- System: Mumbai Suburban Railway station
- Owner: Ministry of Railways, Indian Railways
- Line: Western Line
- Platforms: 3
- Tracks: 4

Construction
- Structure type: Standard on-ground station

Other information
- Status: Active
- Station code: VGN
- Fare zone: Western Railways

Services
Preceding station	Mumbai Suburban Railway	Following station
Boisar towards Churchgate	Western line	Dahanu Road Terminus
Route map
Location
- Location within India Location within Maharashtra

Vangaon is a railway station on the Western line of the Mumbai Suburban Railway network. It is the second last station on the Western Suburban Line, before Dahanu Road, the northern terminus.

== Platforms ==
The station has three platforms, with Platform 1 having direct road access, while Platforms 2 and 3 lie on an island platform. The ticketing office is inside the station building, located on Platform 1.

== Trains ==
The following trains halt at Vangaon railway station in both directions:

- 19023/24 Mumbai Central - Firozpur Janata Express
- All passenger trains (non express) in both directions, halt at Vangaon station.

Mumbai suburban local trains extended their service beyond Virar station up to Dahanu Road, from 16 April 2013. All local trains halt at Vangaon station.

== Gallery ==
Vangaon station building: Front View

Vangaon station building: Rear view

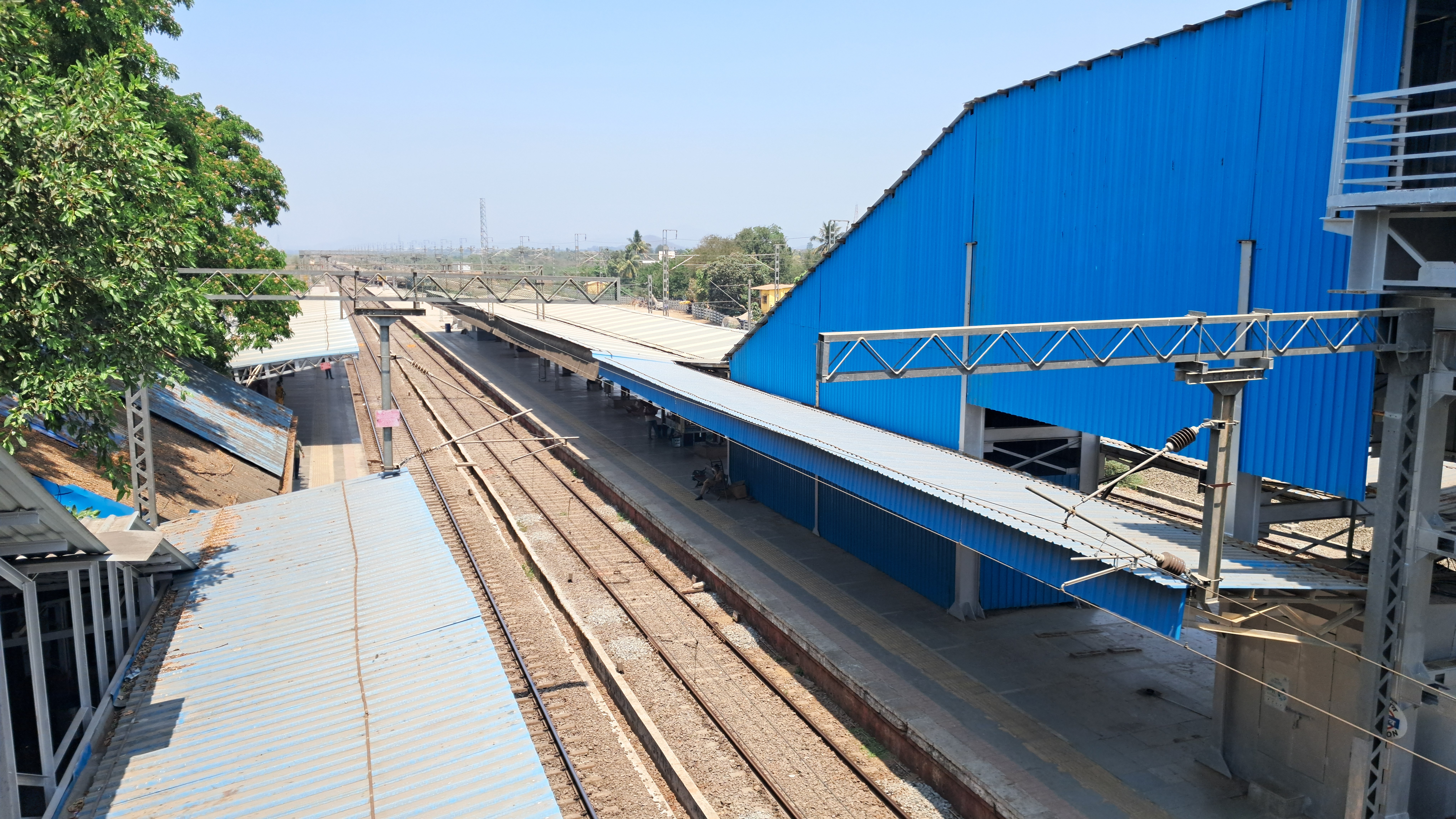
Vangaon Station platforms from station FoB

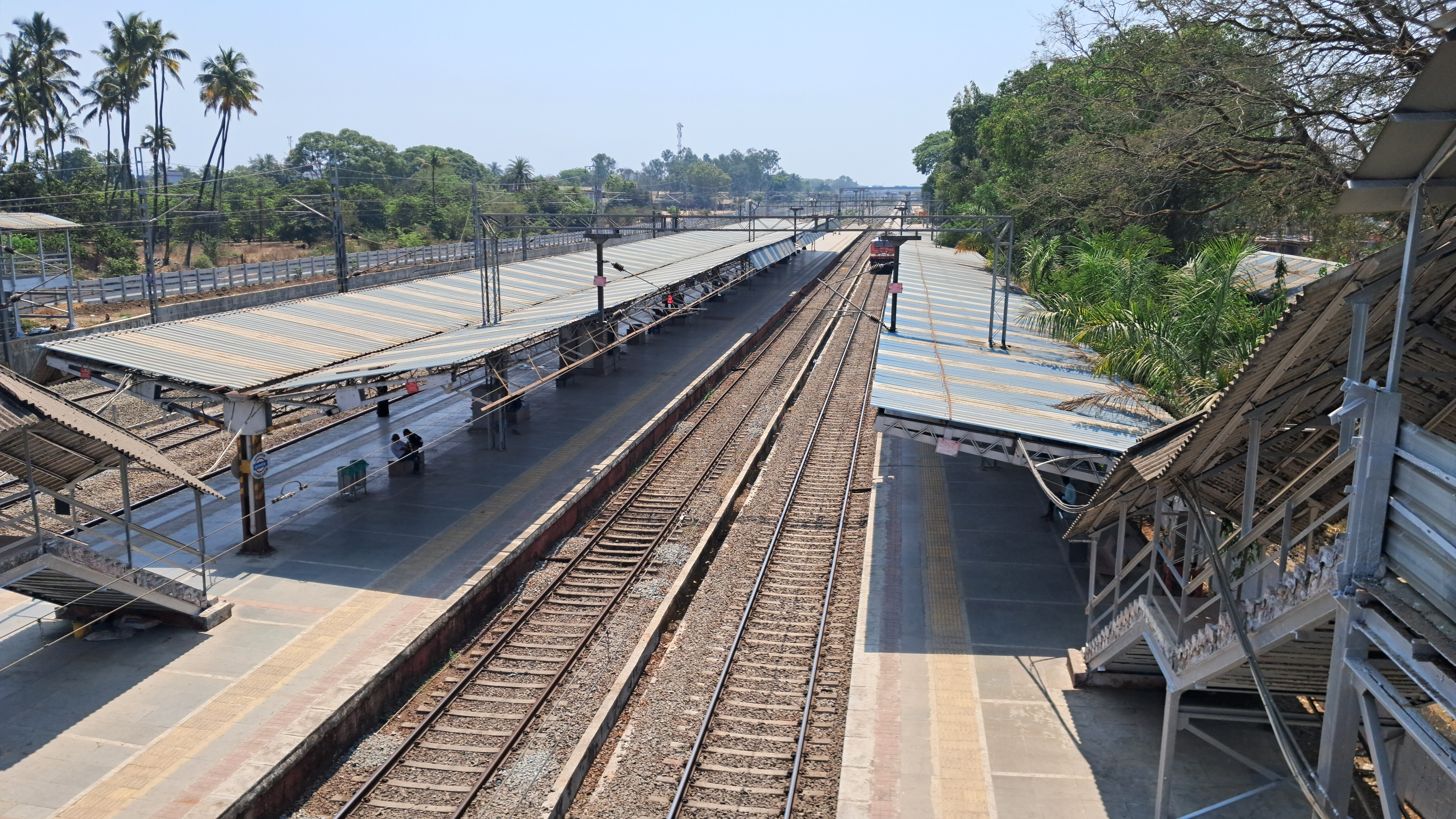
Vangaon Station platforms from station FoB

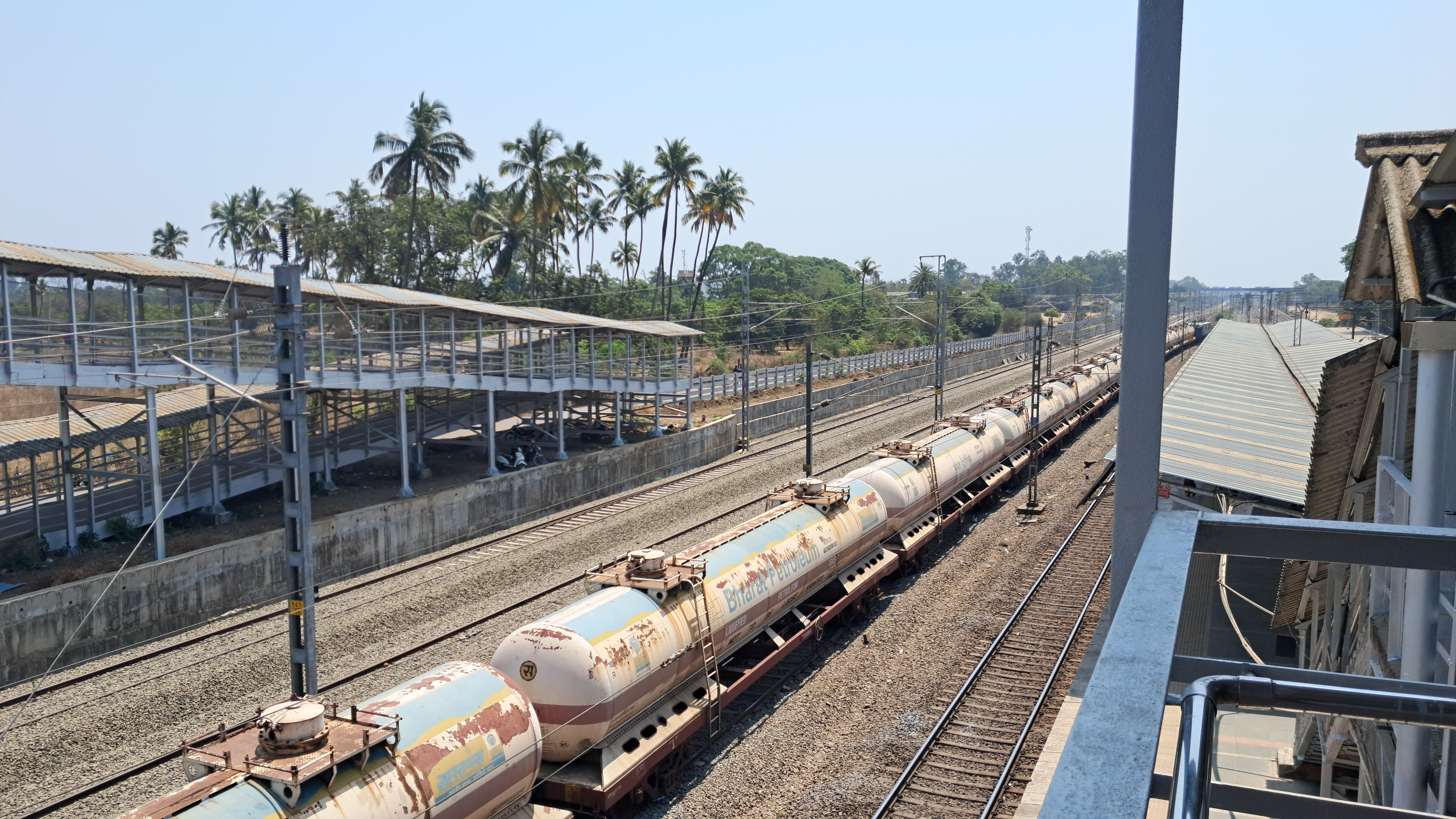
View of Goods and DFC lines from station FoB

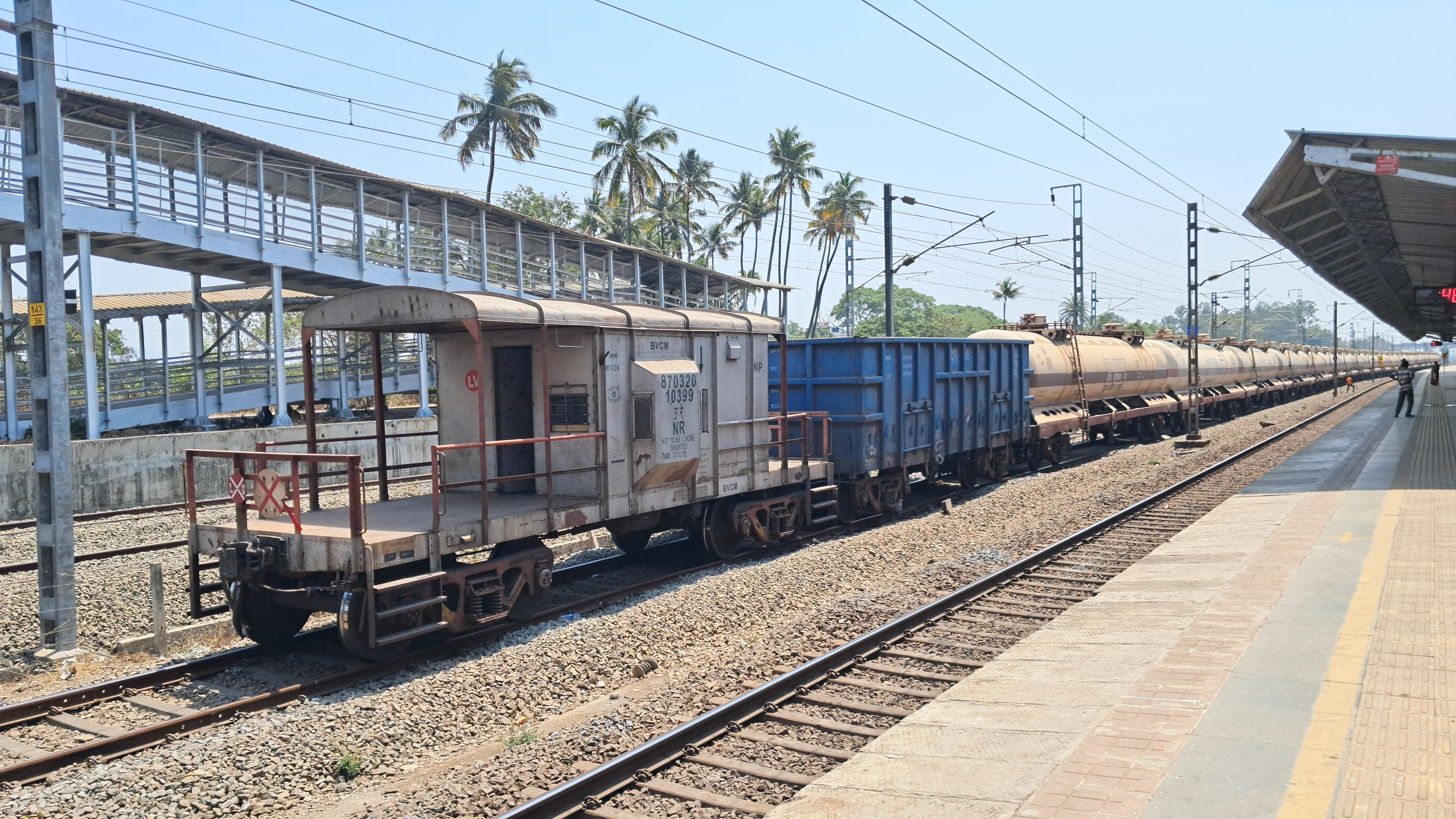
Goods Train halted at Vangaon Station.

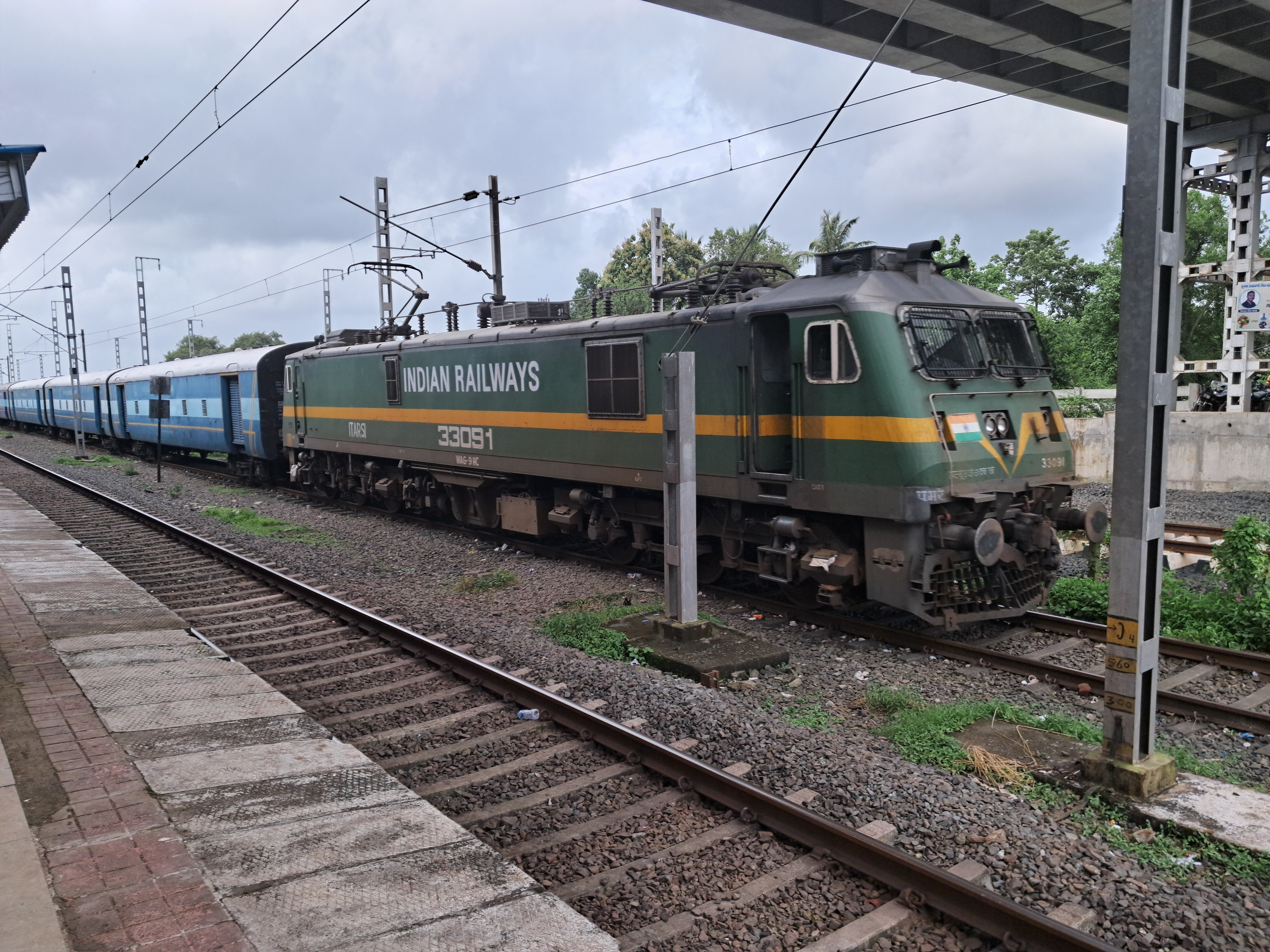
Wag-9 Locomotive at Vangaon Railway station, pulling an automobile carrier rake.

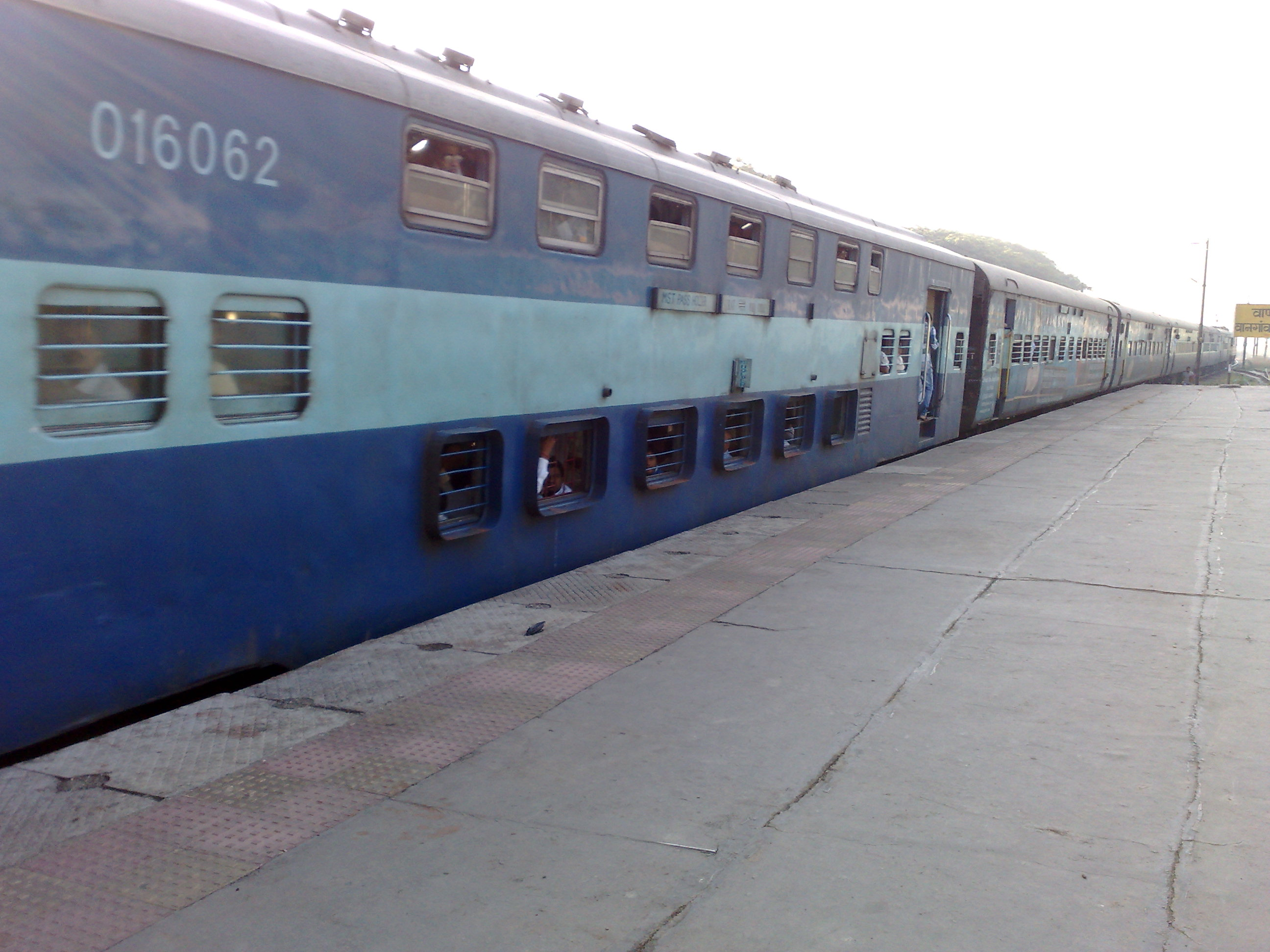
Flying Ranee at Vangaon railway station

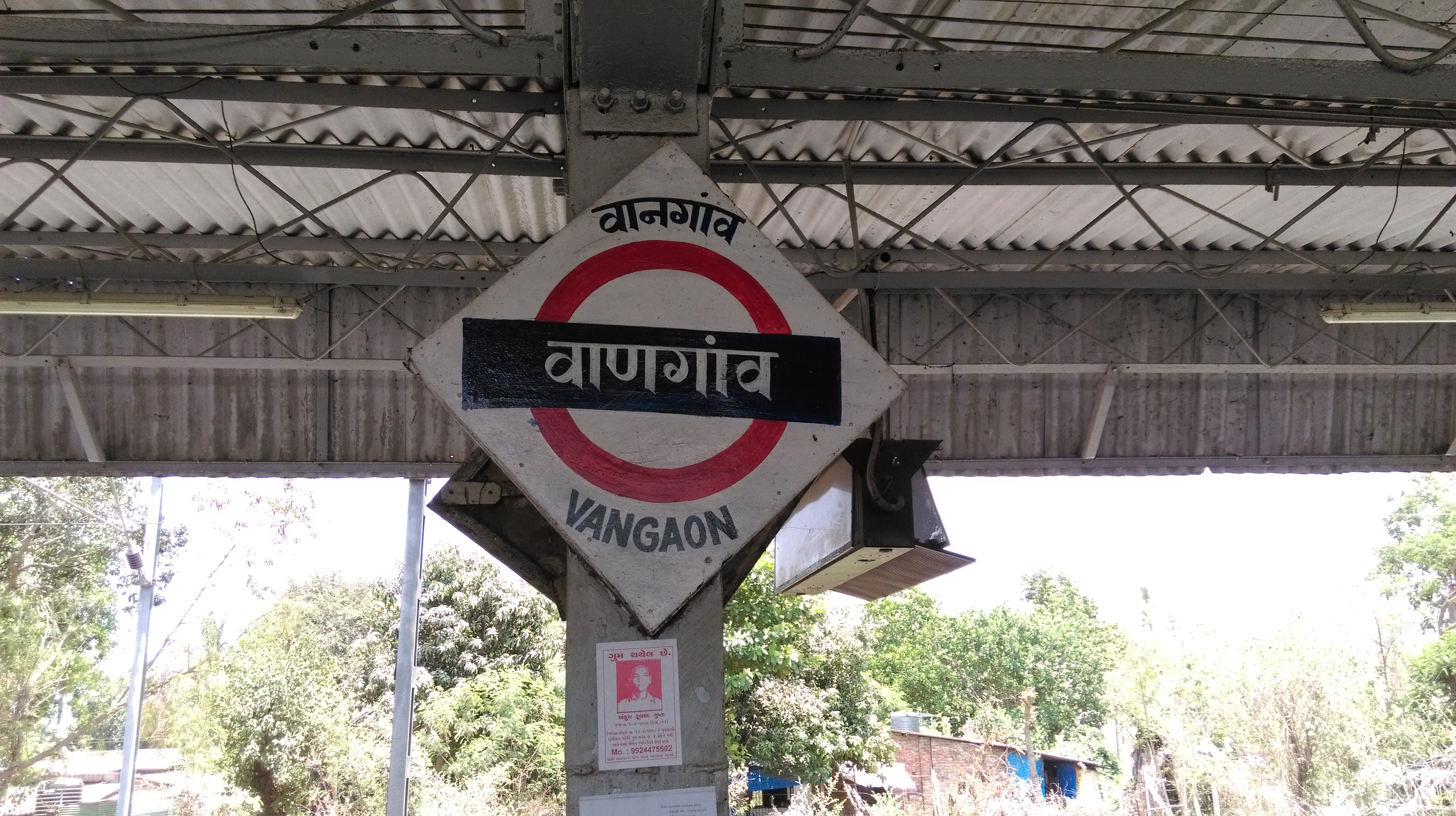
Vangaon railway station - Platform board

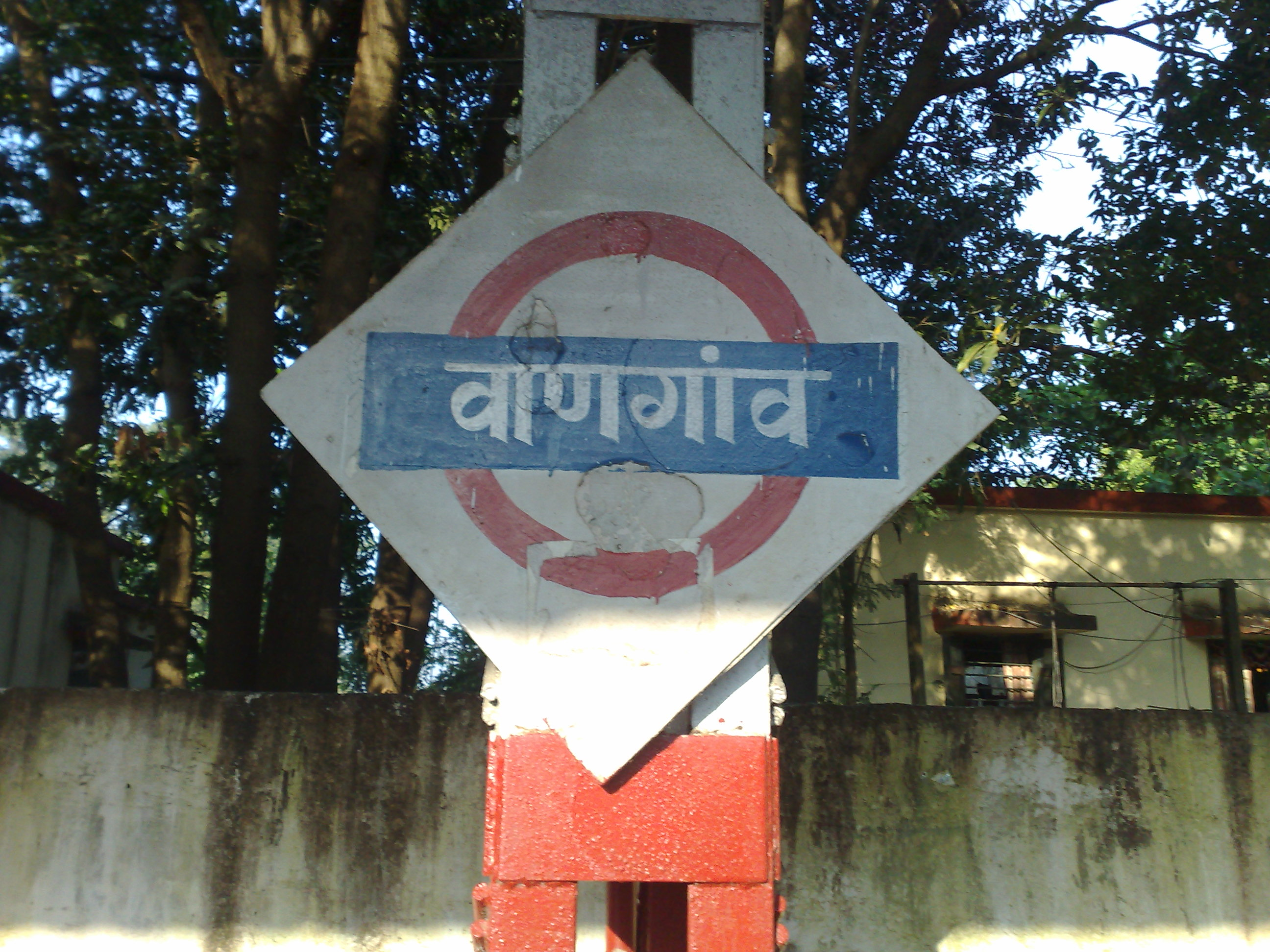
Vangaon railway Platform board
