= Vangaon =

Village in Maharashtra

- Village
- Location in Maharashtra, India Vangaon (India)
- Coordinates: 19°52′N 72°45′E
- Country: India
- State: Maharashtra
- District: Palghar
- Taluka: Dahanu

Government
  - Body: Gram panchayat

Population (2011)
  - Total: 7,649

Languages
  - Official: Marathi
- Time zone: UTC+5:30 (IST)
- PIN: 401 103
- Telephone code: 02528
- ISO 3166 code: IN-MH
- Vehicle registration: MH
- 2011 census code: 551739
- Vidhan Sabha constituency: Palghar
- Website: maharashtra.gov.in

Vangaon is a village in the Palghar district of Maharashtra, India. It is located in the Dahanu taluka.

== Education ==
The Vangaon Educational Society operates various educational institutions in Vangaon:

- Baijnathsingh Mahadevsingh Thakur English Medium School – nursery to Standard 10
- Jagmohan Mahadevsingh Thakur High school – offers Standard 5 to Standard 10, with hostel facilities for Aadivasi students
- Rajendrasingh Thakur College
- There is one government-operated industrial training institute, providing training for various industry courses such as welding, turning, CNC machines, etc.

Students across the district enroll in this institute to gain technical and practical knowledge.

== Culture ==
There are public temples in Vangaon such as Mahadev, Hanuman Temple, Dattatraya, as well as two private temples Radha Raman Mandir & Gayatri Mandir.

Several festivals are celebrated in the village. Ganeshotsav or Ganesh Chaturthi is the most popular festival in Maharashtra. Navaratri festivals are organized by Navratri Mahotsav Mandal and Jatras are organized every year at the Mahadev Temple at Datta Mandir during Datta Jayanti. Festivals are also organized at Hanuman Mandir during Hanuman Jayanti.

Vangaon has a weekly Sunday market offering groceries, apparel, and food items.

== Cuisine ==
Vangaon is well known for chikoo, made from sapodilla fruit, capsicum, tomatoes, and coconuts.

== Industrial area and power stations ==
Tarapur Maharashtra Industrial Development Corporation (MIDC), Tarapur Atomic Power Station, and a Reliance Energy thermal power station are located near the village. Tarapur MIDC hosts specialty chemicals, bulk pharmaceuticals, steel, alloy, and textile manufacturing companies.

== Public transport ==
The primary modes of transportation are trains, auto rickshaws, and state transport buses (Maharashtra State Transport Corporation).

== Demographics ==
According to the 2011 census of India, Vangaon has 1,645 households. The effective literacy rate (i.e. the literacy rate of the population excluding children aged 6 and below) is 82.4%.

Demographics (2011 Census)
	Total	Male	Female
Population	7649	3950	3699
Children aged below 6 years	909	463	446
Scheduled caste	231	131	100
Scheduled tribe	2629	1317	1312
Literates	5554	3083	2471
Workers (all)	3048	2198	850
Main workers (total)	2757	2014	743
Main workers: Cultivators	188	138	50
Main workers: Agricultural labourers	575	330	245
Main workers: Household industry workers	198	134	64
Main workers: Other	1796	1412	384
Marginal workers (total)	291	184	107
Marginal workers: Cultivators	64	35	29
Marginal workers: Agricultural labourers	84	54	30
Marginal workers: Household industry workers	13	8	5
Marginal workers: Others	130	87	43
Non-workers	4601	1752	2849
