= Kaman Road railway station =

Railway Station in Maharashtra, India

Kaman Road
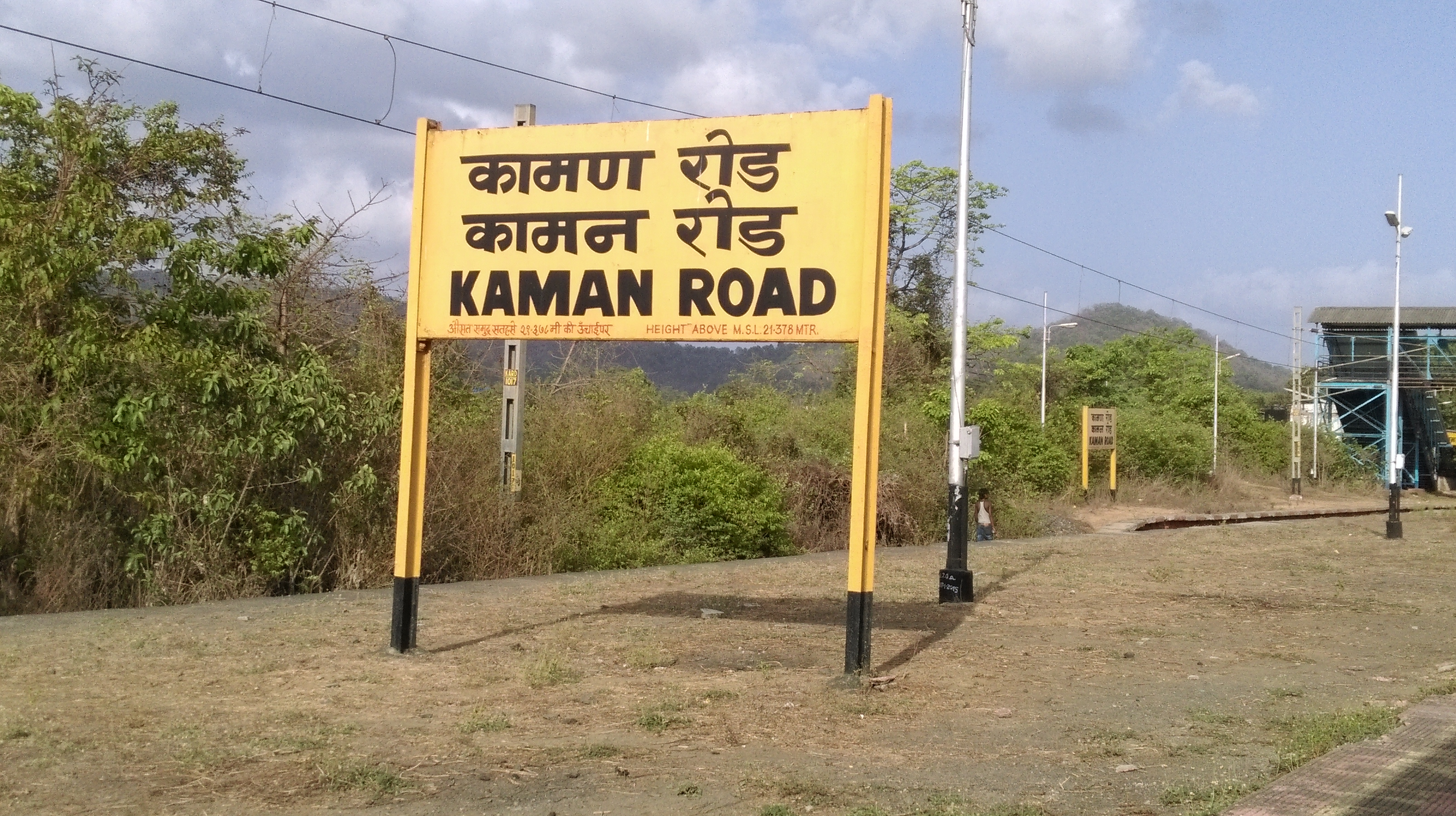

General information
- Location: Naigaon East, Kaman Road, Navghar, Maharashtra, India.
- Coordinates: 19.336404°N 72.918925°E
- Elevation: 21.378 metres (70.14 ft)
- System: Indian Railways and Mumbai Suburban Railway station
- Owner: Ministry of Railways, Indian Railways
- Line: Vasai Road–Roha line
- Platforms: 3
- Tracks: 4

Construction
- Structure type: Standard on-ground station
- Parking: No
- Cycle facilities: No

Other information
- Status: Active
- Station code: KARD
- Fare zone: Central Railways

History
- Former names: Kaman

Services
Preceding station	Mumbai Suburban Railway	Following station
Juchandra towards Vasai Road	Vasai Road–Roha line	Kharbav towards Roha
Route map
Location
- Location within India Location within Maharashtra

Kaman Road is a railway station in Naigaon East on the Vasai Road–Diva Junction–Panvel rail route of the Central Line of the Mumbai Suburban Railway network. The station code is KARD. It has four platforms.

Kaman Road is the next railway station after Kharbao railway station in the south & before Juchandra railway station in the north.

Kaman Road railway station is situated in the area of Navghar also called Sasunavghar in the Eastern part of Naigaon, Maharashtra, India. This Railway Station is easily accessible by road from Naigaon East Railway Station (Western Line) & Juchandra Railway Station -[located in Naigaon East] (Central Line).

Kaman Road Railway Station is beneficial for the people residing in Navghar area of Naigaon East to travel towards Diva Jn. & Panvel Rail Stations in the South & Vasai Road Rail Station in the North.

Kaman Road is a Railway Station located near National Highway 48.
