= Kopar railway station =

Railway station in Maharashtra, India

Kopar
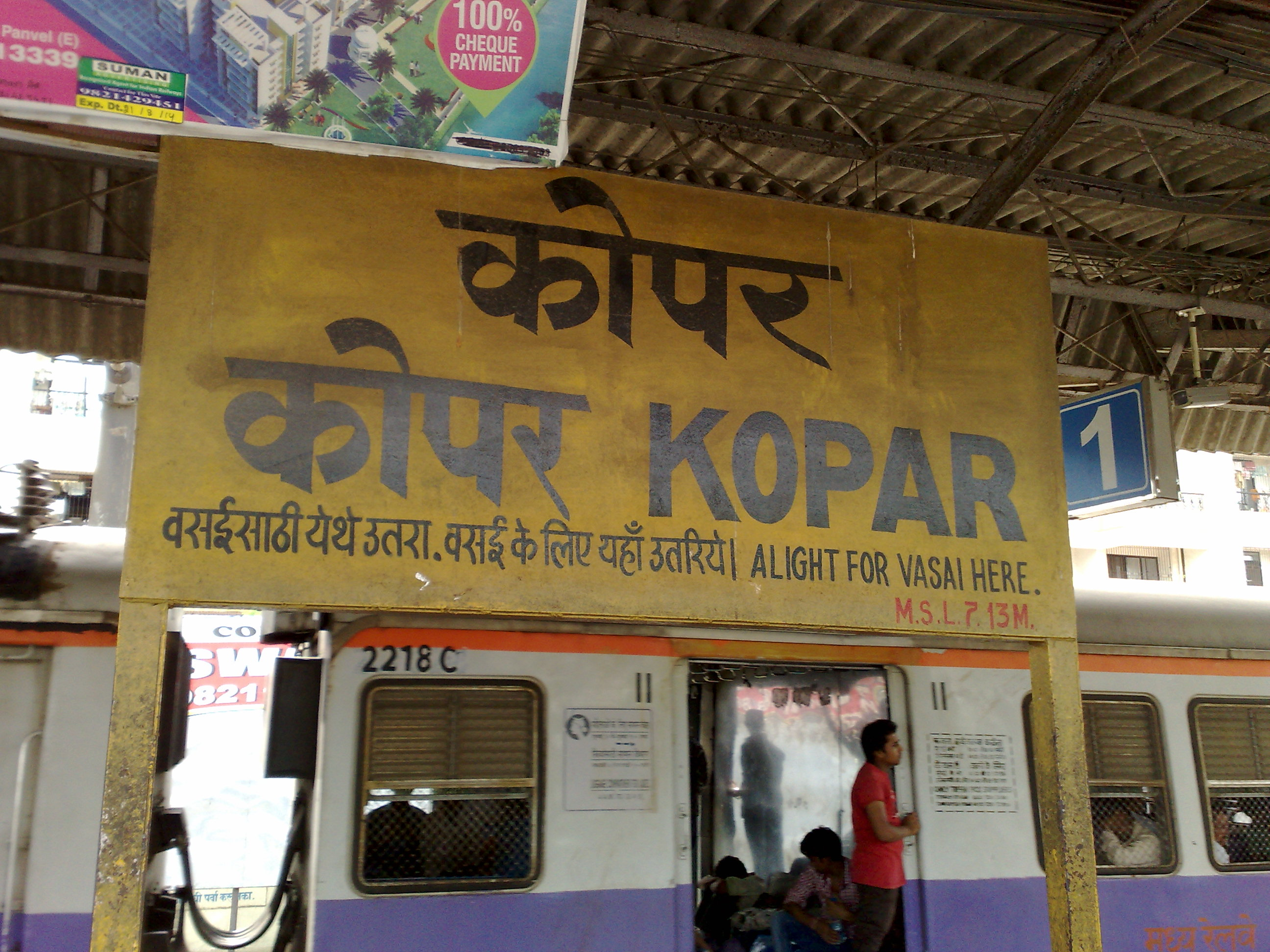

General information
- Location: Kopar, Dombivli
- Coordinates: 19.2112°N 73.0776°E
- Elevation: 14.800 metres (48.56 ft) – Upper Kopar; 7.130 metres (23.39 ft) – Lower Kopar
- System: Indian Railways and Mumbai Suburban Railway station
- Owner: Ministry of Railways, Indian Railways
- Lines: Central Line & Vasai Road–Roha line

Construction
- Structure type: At-grade + Elevated
- Platform levels: 2 (Lower Kopar & Upper Kopar)

Other information
- Status: Active
- Station code: KOPR
- Fare zone: Central Railways

History
- Opened: 3 September 2007

Services
| Preceding station | Mumbai Suburban Railway | Following station |
|---|---|---|
| Diva Junction towards Chhatrapati Shivaji Terminus | Central line | Dombivli towards Kasara or Khopoli |
| Bhiwandi towards Vasai Road | Vasai Road–Roha line | Diva Junction towards Roha |
Route map
Location
- Location within India Location within Maharashtra Location within Mumbai

Kopar (station code: KOPR) is a railway station in Kopar in Central Railways in Thane district, Maharashtra.

It lies on the Vasai Road–Roha route and Central main line of the Mumbai Suburban Railway network. It has four platforms.

== Gallery ==
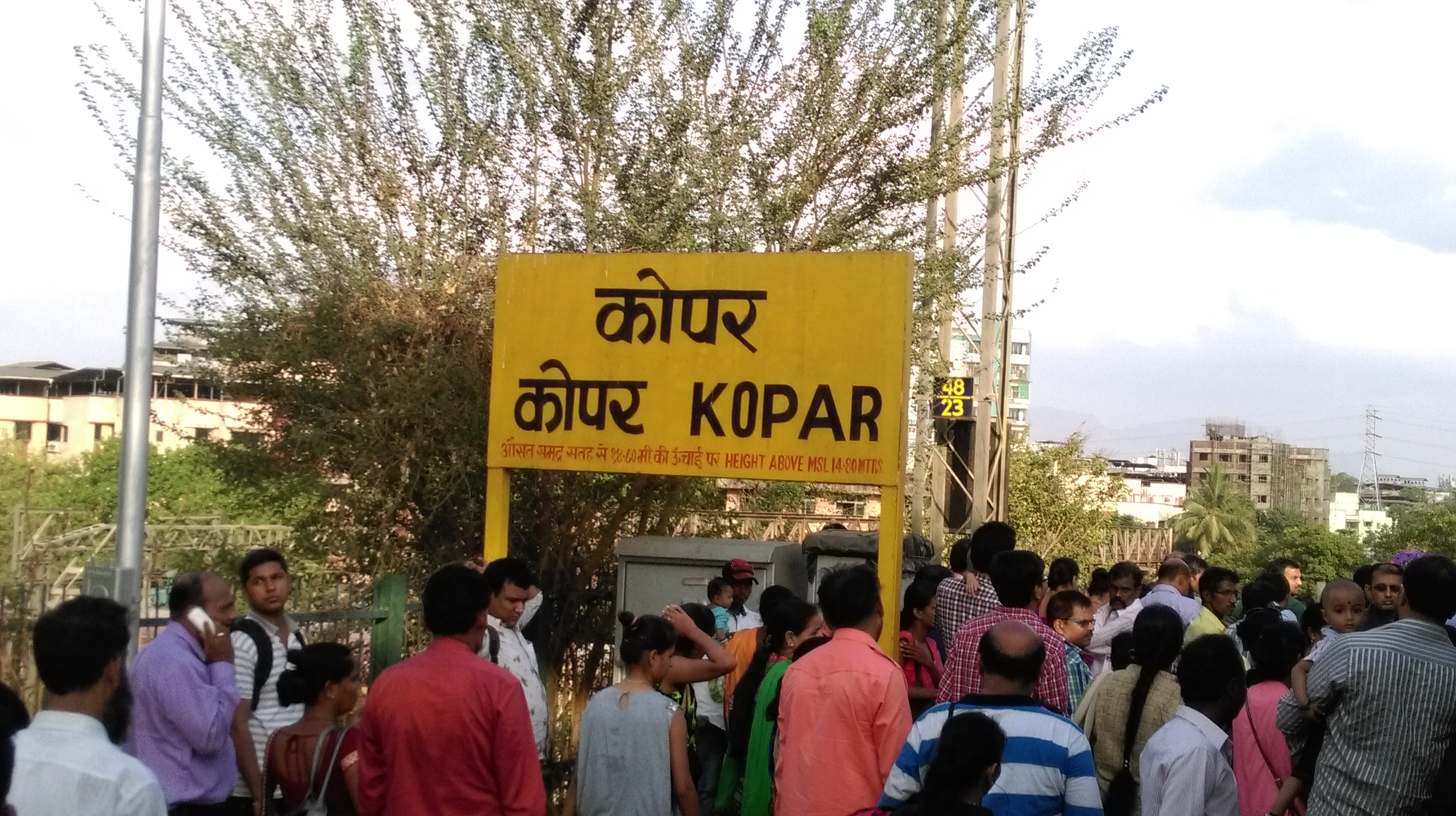
Kopar railway station – Station board

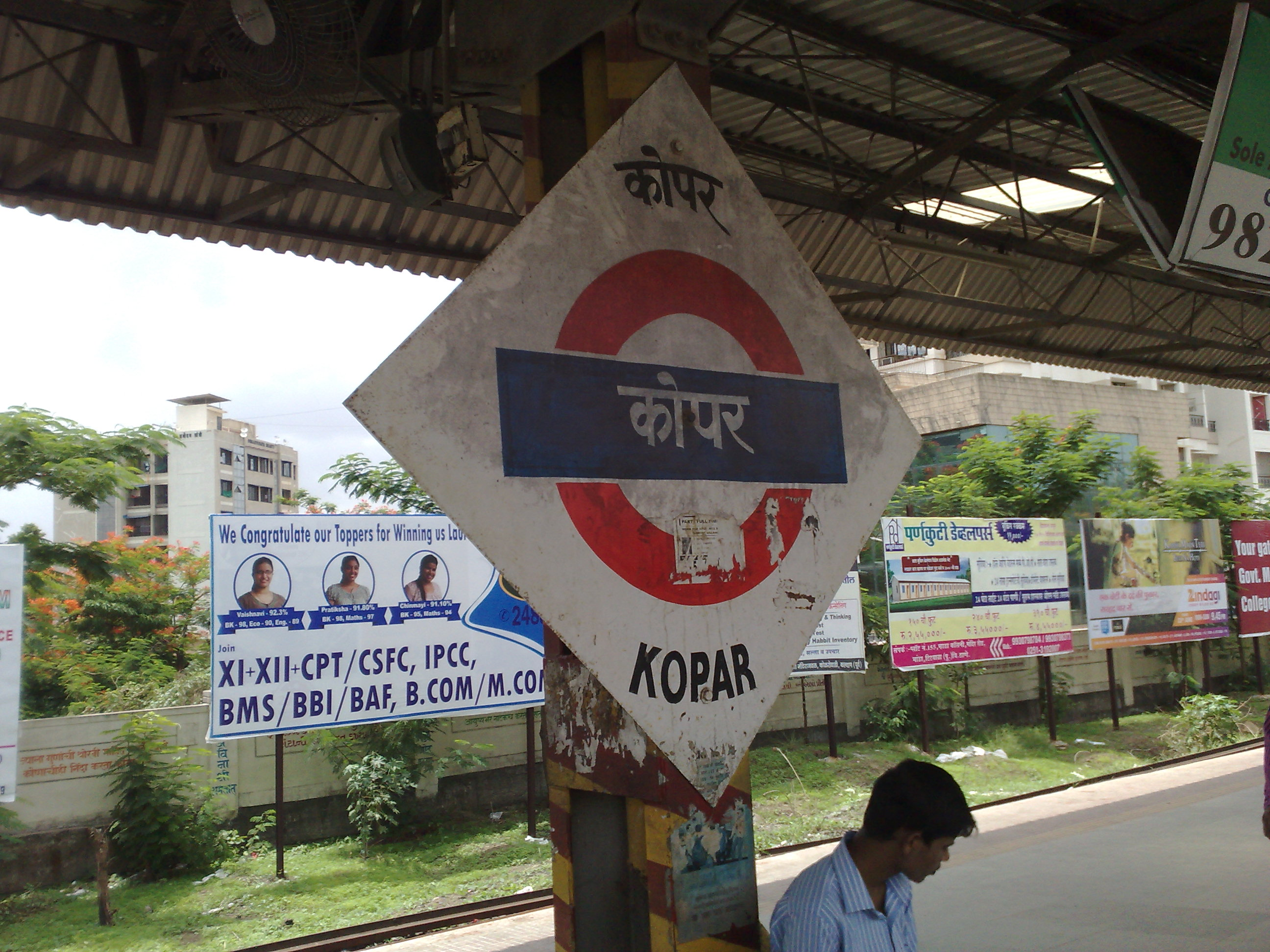
Kopar railway station – Platformboard

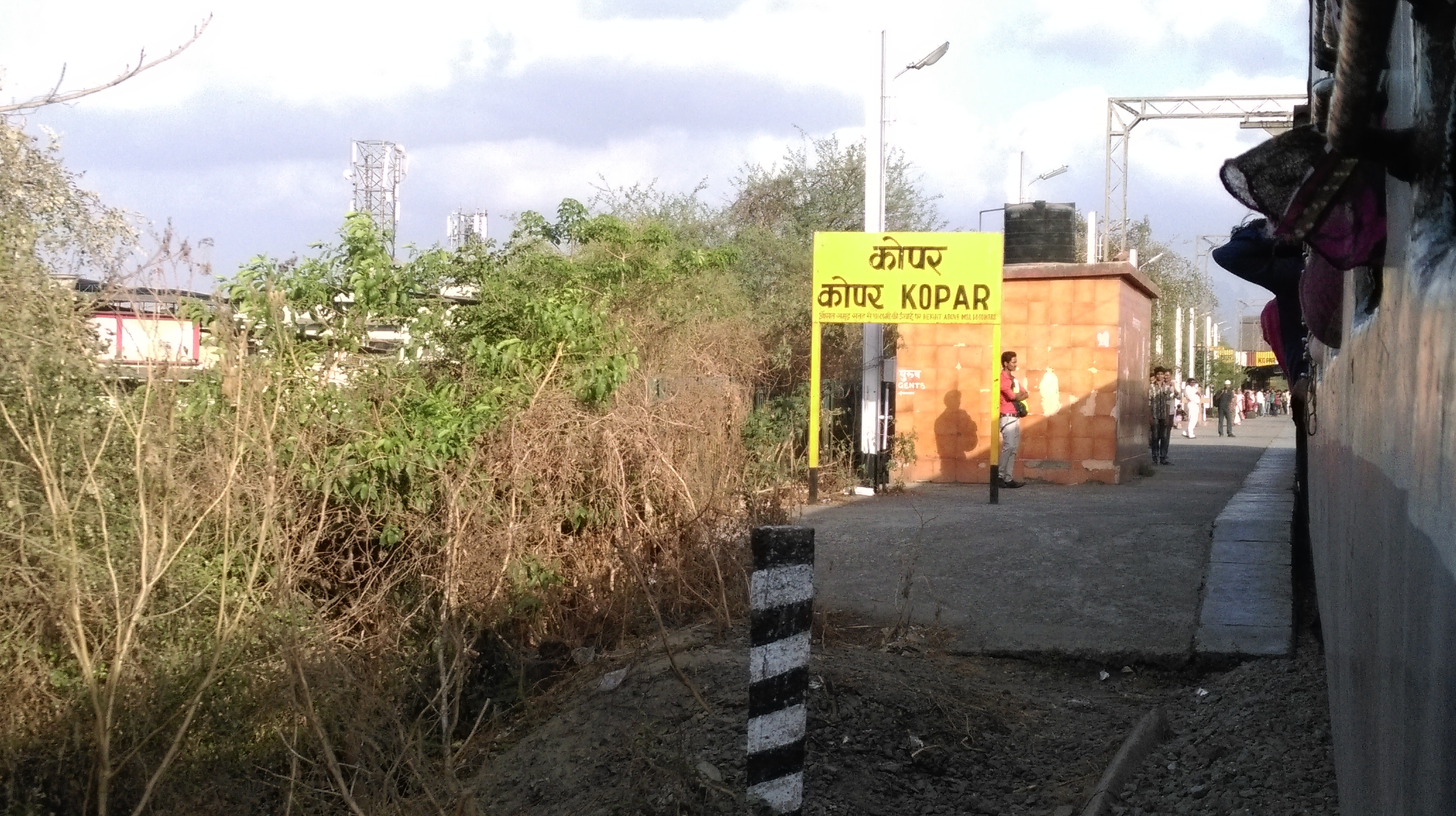
Upper Kopar railway station – Platform

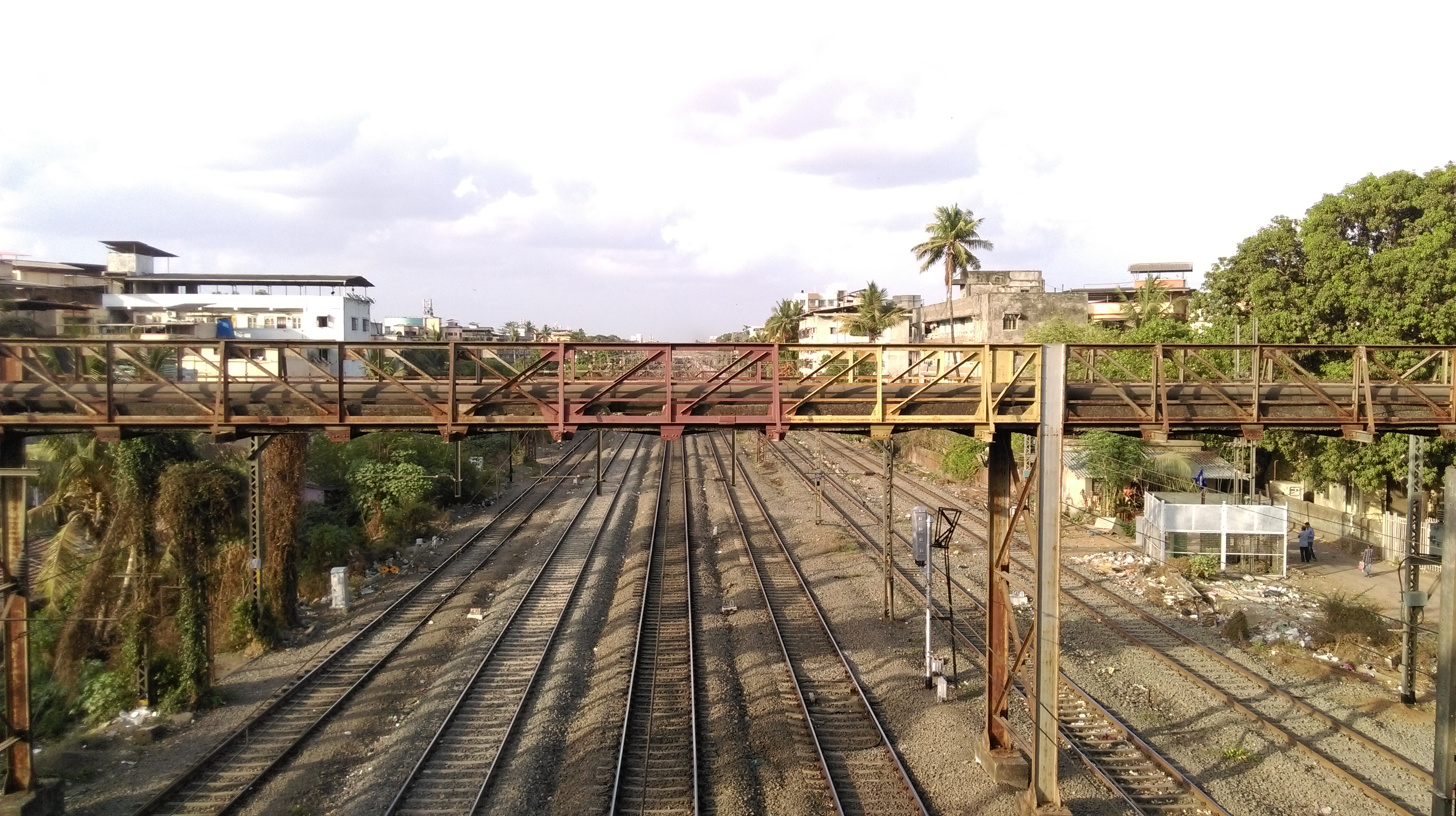
Kopar railway station – View of Central Railway main line from Upper Kopar
