= Bhiwandi Road railway station =

Train station in Mumbai, India

Bhiwandi Road

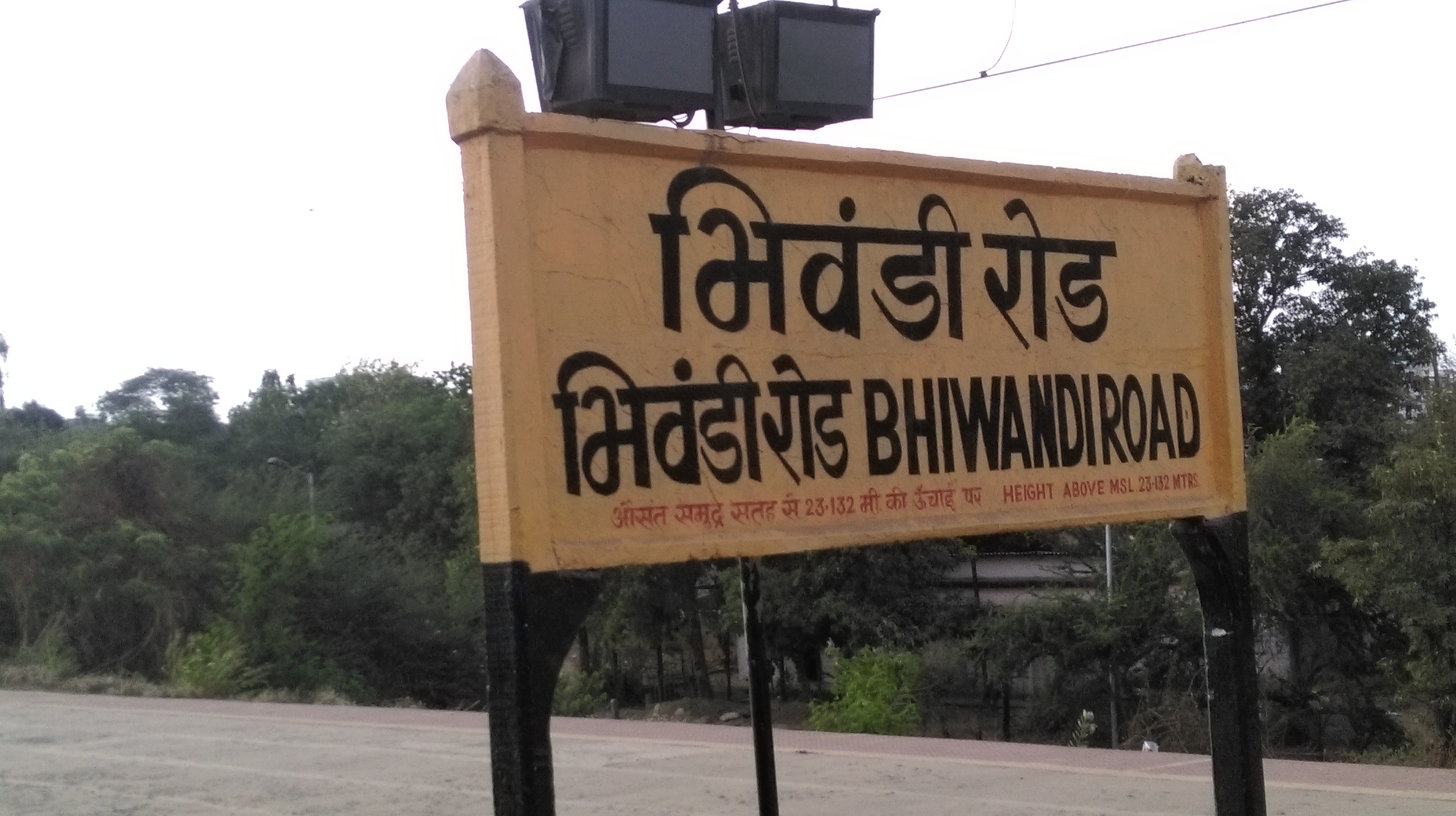

General information
- Coordinates: 19.268462°N 73.046174°E
- Elevation: 23.132 metres (75.89 ft)
- System: Mumbai Suburban Railway station
- Owner: Ministry of Railways, Indian Railways
- Line: Vasai Road–Roha line
- Platforms: 5
- Tracks: Double electric line

Construction
- Structure type: Standard on-ground station
- Parking: Yes
- Cycle facilities: Yes

Other information
- Status: Active
- Station code: BIRD
- Fare zone: Central Railways

Services
Preceding station	Mumbai Suburban Railway	Following station
Kharbav towards Vasai Road	Vasai Road–Roha line	Kopar towards Roha
Route map
Location
- Location within Mumbai

Bhiwandi Road is a railway station in Thane, India, on the Vasai Road–Diva–Panvel route of the Central Railway, of the Mumbai Suburban Railway network. The Bhiwandi station lies on the Vasai–Diva corridor, between the Western Line and Central line. A Mainline (MEMU) service runs from Diva Junction to Vasai Road. Computerised reservation services has been installed at this station obviating the need to go to Kalyan for tickets.

The platforms at Bhiwandi Road railway station are very spacious. There are 5 platforms. The trains towards Kopar & Diva halt at platform 1, 2 or 3 and the train moving towards Vasai Road halt at platform 4 or 5. A Decent number of trains halt at Bhiwandi.

There was a necessity for a suburban rail line for Bhiwandi. The Mumbai Metropolitan Region Development Authority started to construct the Orange Line 5 of the Mumbai Metro through Bhiwandi.

== History ==
In British times, sweet sugarcane was spread from Saltbunder road to Bhiwandi. In this area railway was stopped by the British for transporting salt by freight.

== Train statistics ==
- Number of halting trains :51
- Number of originating trains :0
- Number of terminating trains :0

== Major trains ==
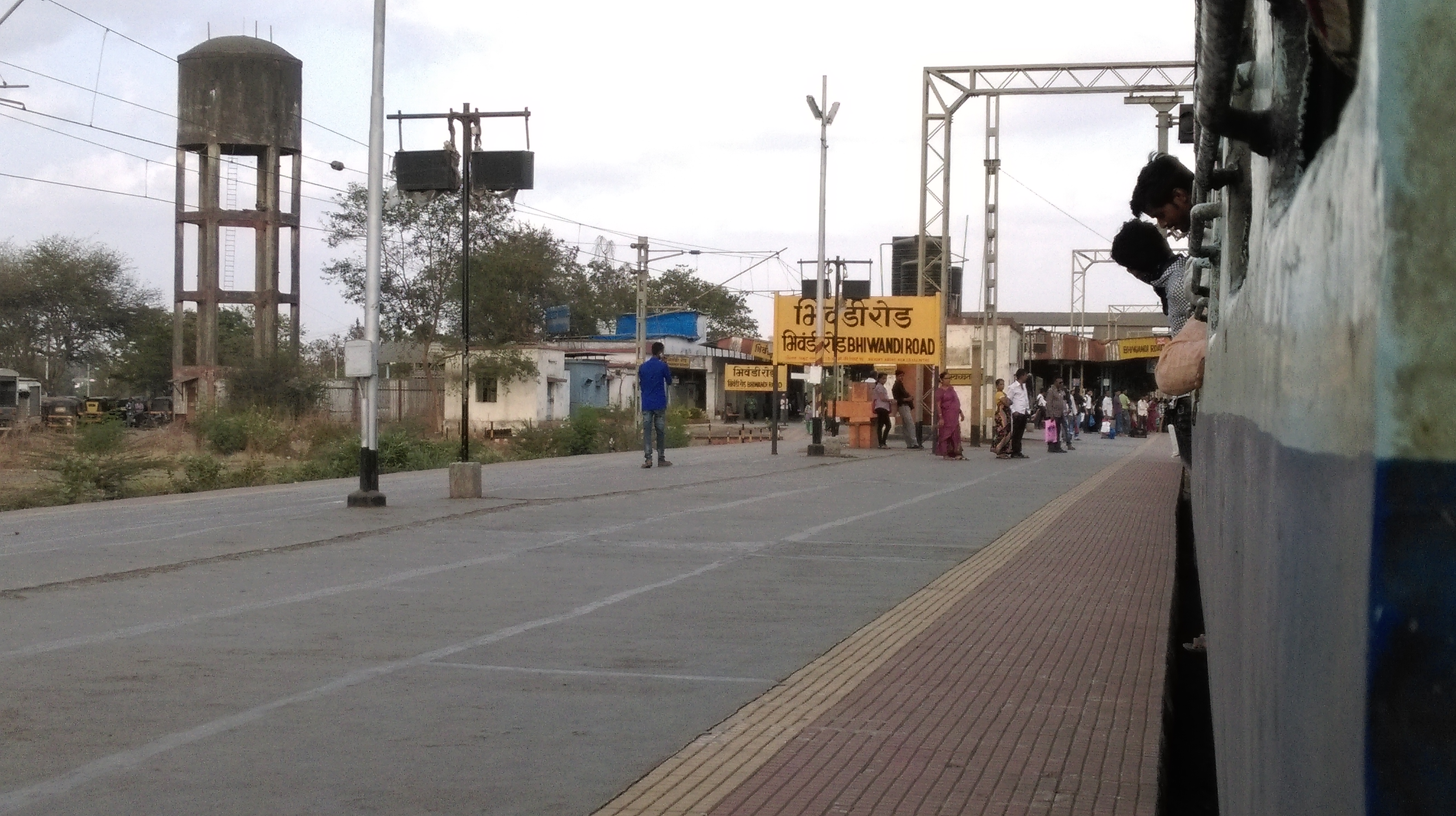
Bhiwandi Road railway station – Platform

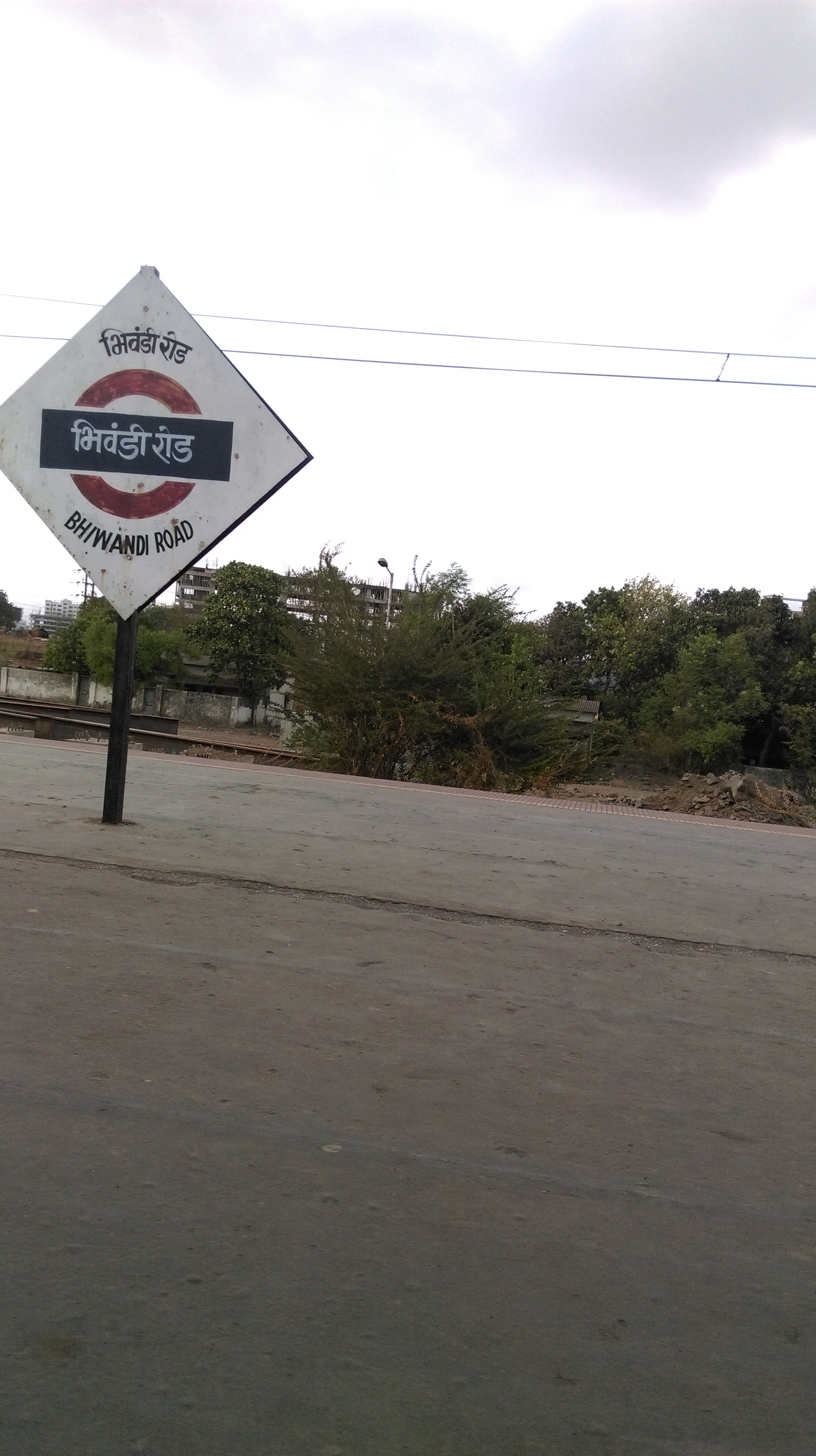
Bhiwandi Road railway station – Platform board

- 61002-Dombivli-Boisar MEMU
- 69164-Dahanu Road–Pavel MEMU
- 69165-Panvel–Vasai Road MEMU
- 61003-Vasai Road–Diva MEMU
- 61004-Diva–Vasai Road MEMU
- 61005-Vasai Road–Diva MEMU
- 61006-Diva–Vasai Road MEMU
- 61007-Vasai Road–Diva MEMU
- 61008-Diva–Vasai Road MEMU
- 61009-Vasai Road–Diva MEMU
- 61021-Vasai Diva MEMU Not on Sunday & Saturday
- 61022-Diva–Vasai MEMU Not on Sunday & Saturday
- 69166-Vasai Road–Panvel MEMU
- 69167-Panvel–Vasai Road MEMU
- 69168-Vasai–Panvel MEMU
- 69161-Panvel–Dahanu Road MEMU
- 19201–Secunderabad Porbandar Weekly Express
- 19202–Secunderabad Express
- 17017–Secunderabad Express
- 17018-Rajkot Express
- 16613-Coimbatore Express
- 19311-Pune–Indore Express
- 19312-Indore–Pune Express
- 22943-Pune–Indore SF Express
- 22944-Indore–Pune SF Express
- 16506-Gandhidham Express
- 16507-KSR Bengaluru Express
- 16335-Nagercoil Weekly Express
- 16336-Gandhidham Express
- 16333-Thiruvananthapuram Express
- 16337-Okha–Ernakulam- Express
- 16338-Ernakulam–Okha Express
- 11049-SCSMT Kolhapur Express
- 11050-Ahmedabad Express
- 16505-KSR Bengaluru Express
- 16507-KSR Bengaluru Express
- 16508-Jodhpur Express
- 16531-KSR Bengaluru Express
- 16532-Ajmer Garib Nawaz Express
- 11087-Veraval–Pune Express
- 11088-Pune–Veraval Express
- 11089-Pune Express
- 11090-Bhagat Ki Kothi Express
- 11092-Pune–Bhuj Express
- 11095-Pune Ahimsa Express
- 11096-Ahmedabad Ahimsa Express
- 16209-Ajmer–Myusuru Express
- 16210-Mysuru–Ajmer Express

== Facilities ==
The platforms are well sheltered. The station is well connected by auto. It provides parking facilities. Smart card-based booking is also installed in the station.
