= Kharbav railway station =

Railway Station in Maharashtra, India

Kharbav

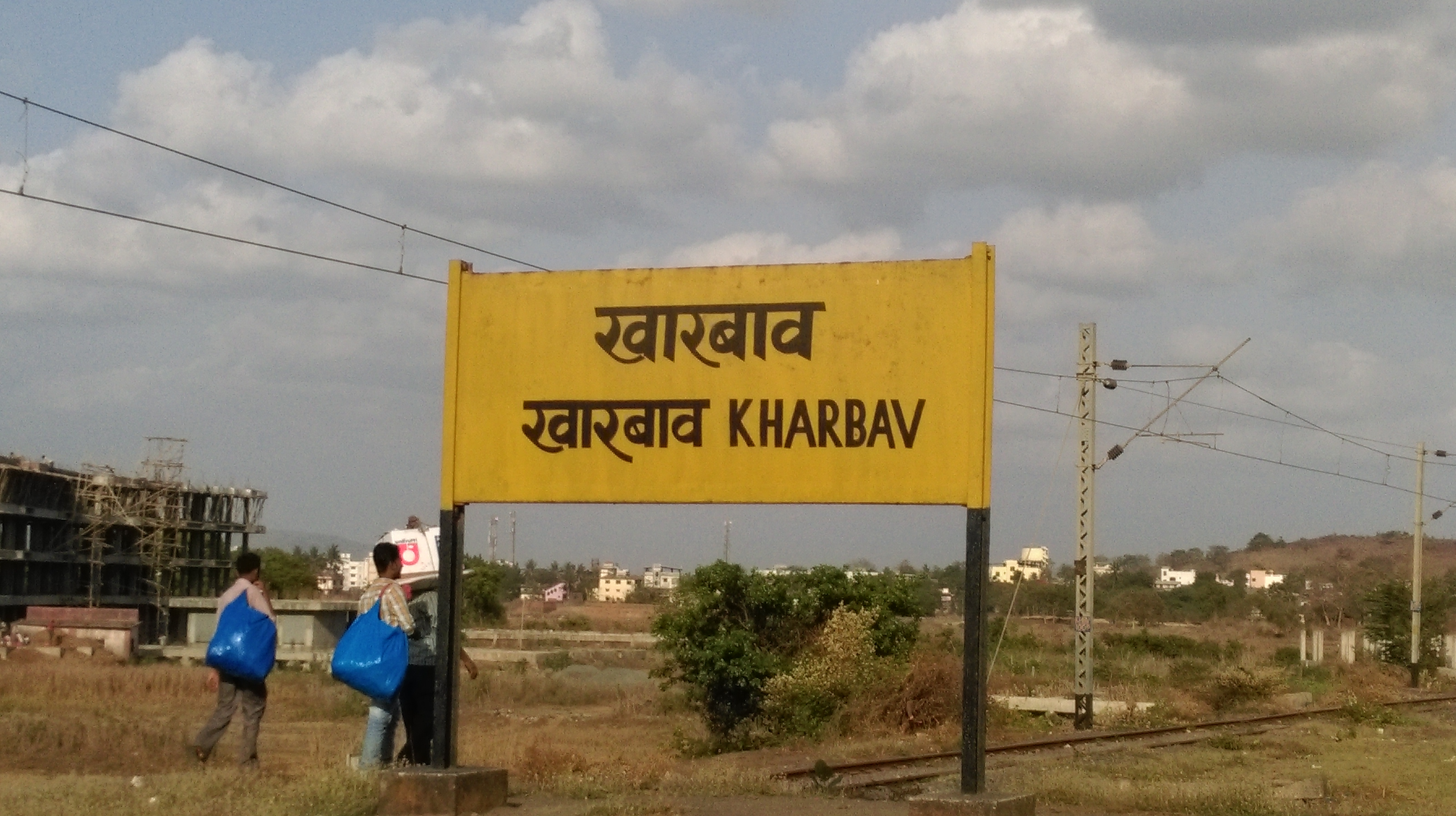

General information
- Coordinates: 19.297979°N 72.984416°E
- System: Mumbai Suburban Railway station
- Owner: Ministry of Railways, Indian Railways
- Line: Vasai Road–Roha line
- Platforms: 4

Construction
- Structure type: Standard on-ground station

Other information
- Status: Active
- Station code: KHBV
- Fare zone: Central Railways

Services
Preceding station	Mumbai Suburban Railway	Following station
Kaman Road towards Vasai Road	Vasai Road–Roha line	Bhiwandi Road towards Roha
Route map
Location
- Location within India Location within Maharashtra Location within Mumbai

Kharbav is a railway station on the Vasai Road–Diva–Panvel–Roha route of the Central Line, of the Mumbai Suburban Railway network. Bhiwandi is the previous stop and Kaman Road is the next stop. It is a developing town and one of the primary railway stations in Paygaon. Around 12 trains pass through Kharbao railway station. Kharbao railway station code is (KHBV).

== Facilities ==
The Kharbao Railway Station is well connected through the city and has parking facilities available as well. Other facilities you can find near this railway station are ATM machines, information kiosks and internet cafes.

The most popular trains passing through the Kharbao railway station are BSR DIVA DMU, BSR PNVL Memu, PNVL BSR Memu and DI BSR DMU.

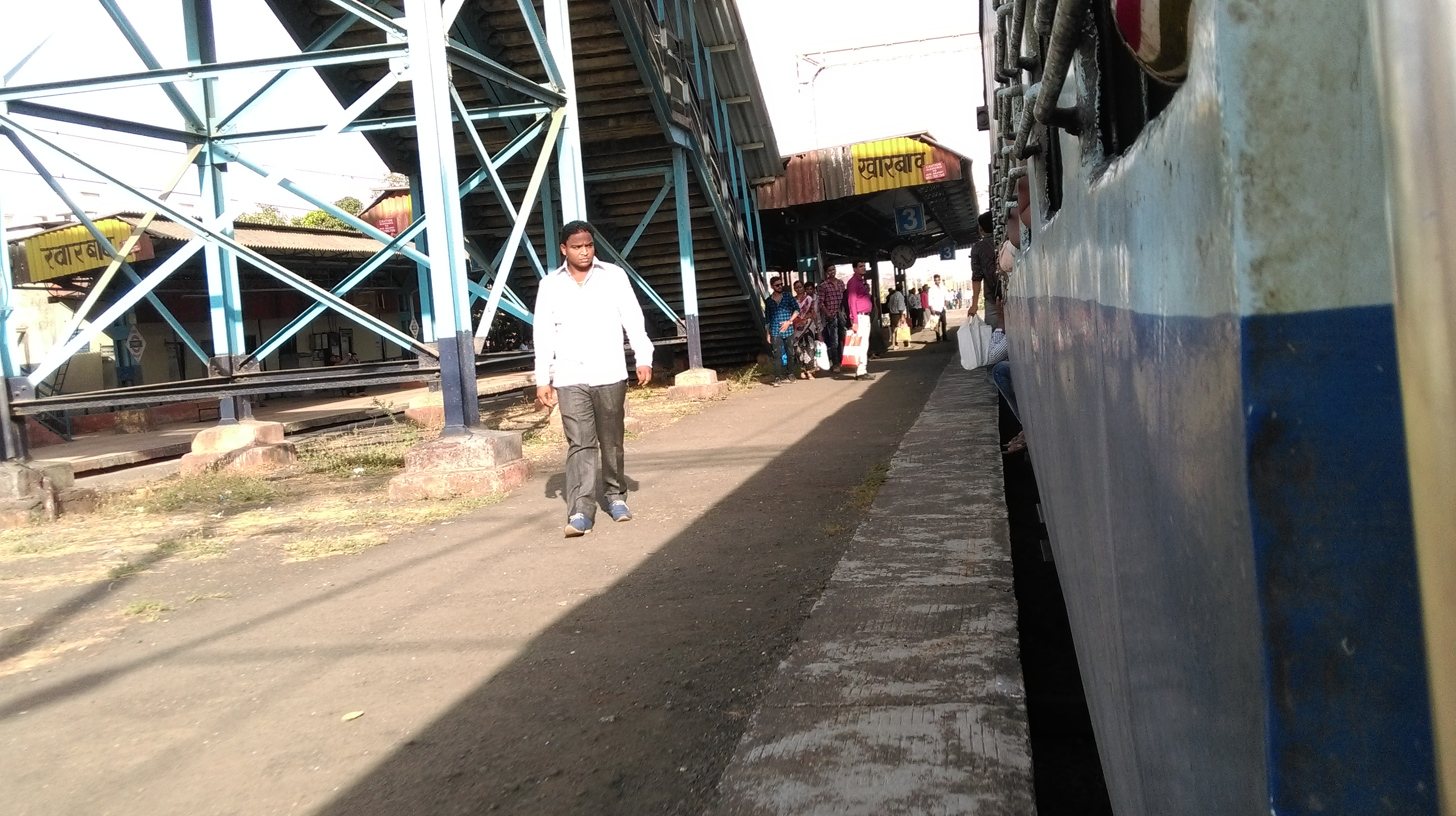
Kharbav railway station – Roof

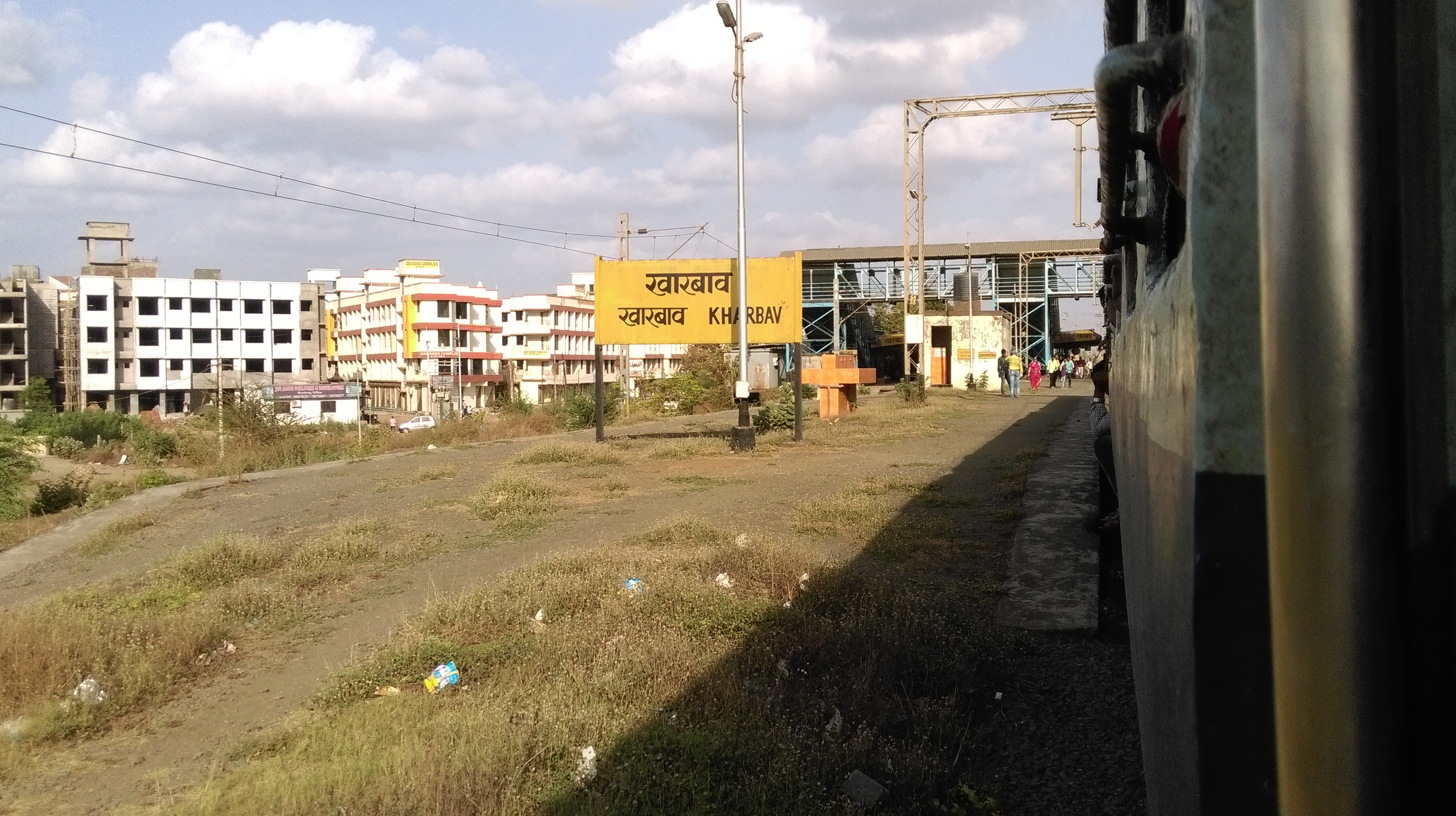
Kharbav railway station – Platform
