= Naigaon railway station =

Railway station on the Western line of the Mumbai Suburban Railway

Naigaon

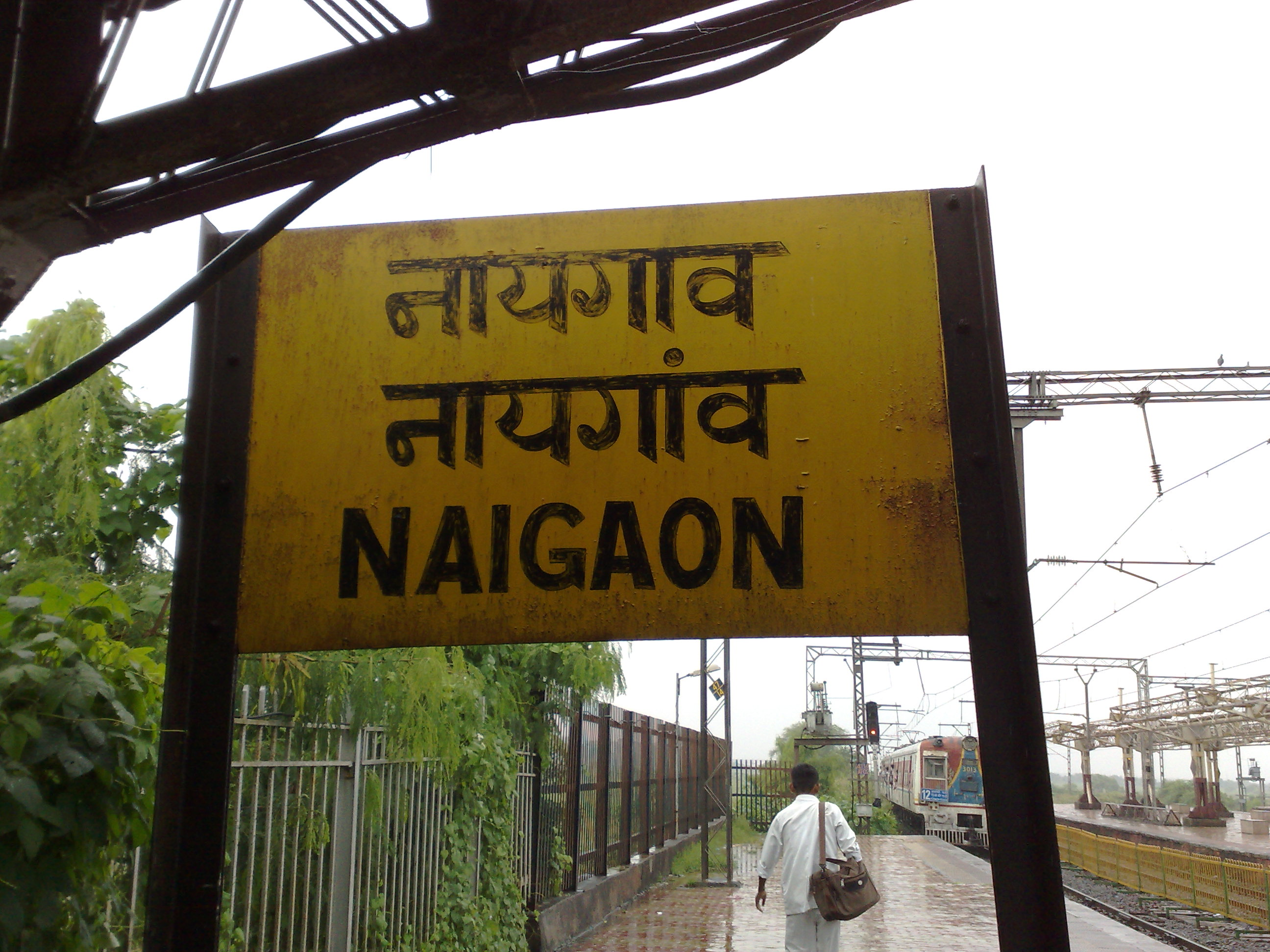

General information
- Location: Naigaon
- Coordinates: 19.351467°N 72.846343°E
- System: Mumbai Suburban Railway Station
- Owner: Ministry of Railways, Indian Railways
- Line: Western Line
- Platforms: 3
- Tracks: 4

Construction
- Structure type: Standard on-ground station
- Parking: Yes
- Cycle facilities: Yes

Other information
- Status: Active
- Station code: NIG
- Fare zone: Western Railways

History
- Opened: August 1956
- Former names: Nayegaon

Services
Preceding station	Mumbai Suburban Railway	Following station
Bhayandar towards Churchgate	Western line	Vasai Road towards Dahanu Road
Route map
Location
- Location within Maharashtra

Naigaon is a railway station on the Western Line of the Mumbai Suburban Railway Network.

The station was opened in August 1956, to cater to the demands of the nearby villages.

== Gallery ==
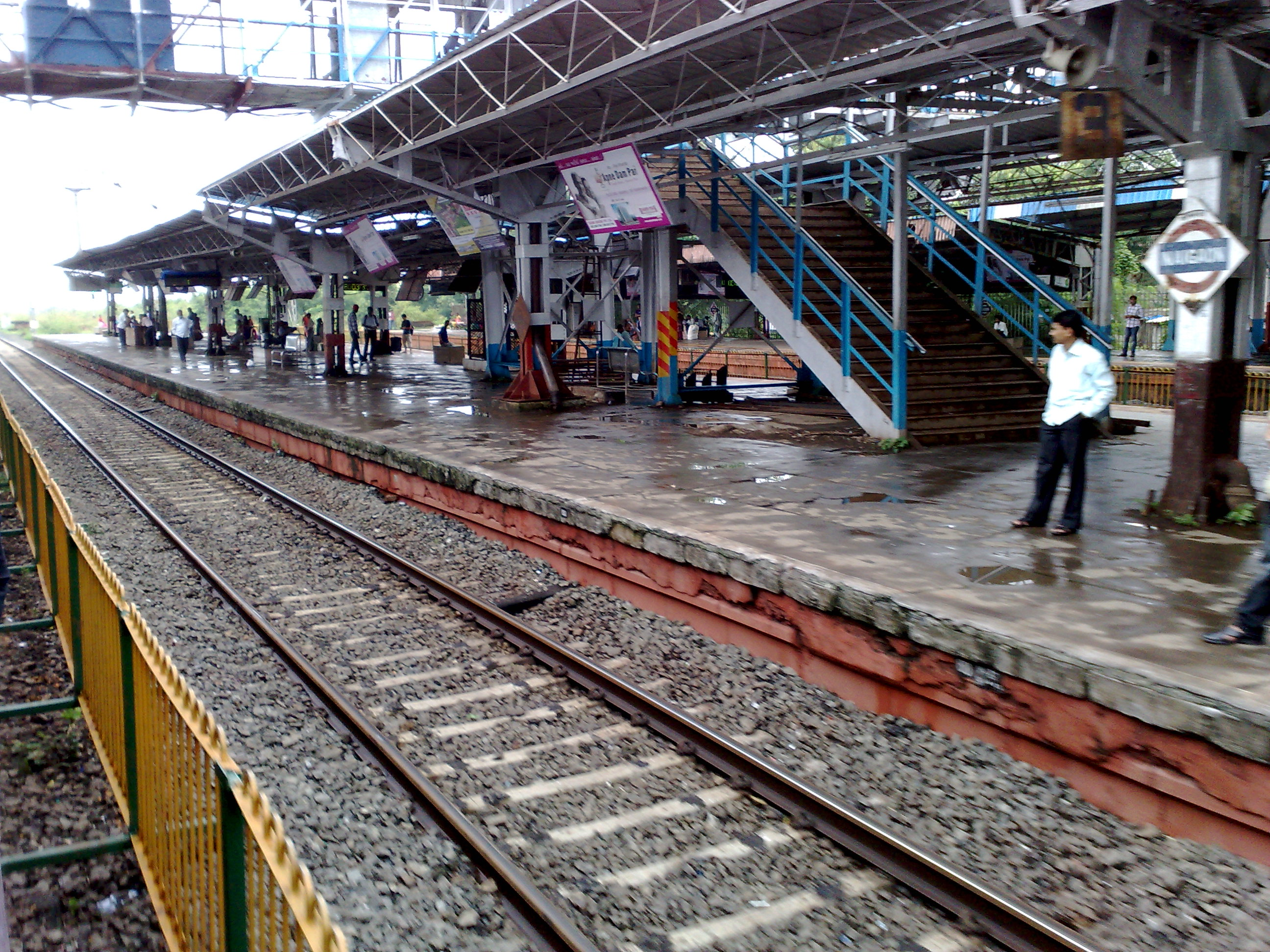
Naigaon station – overview

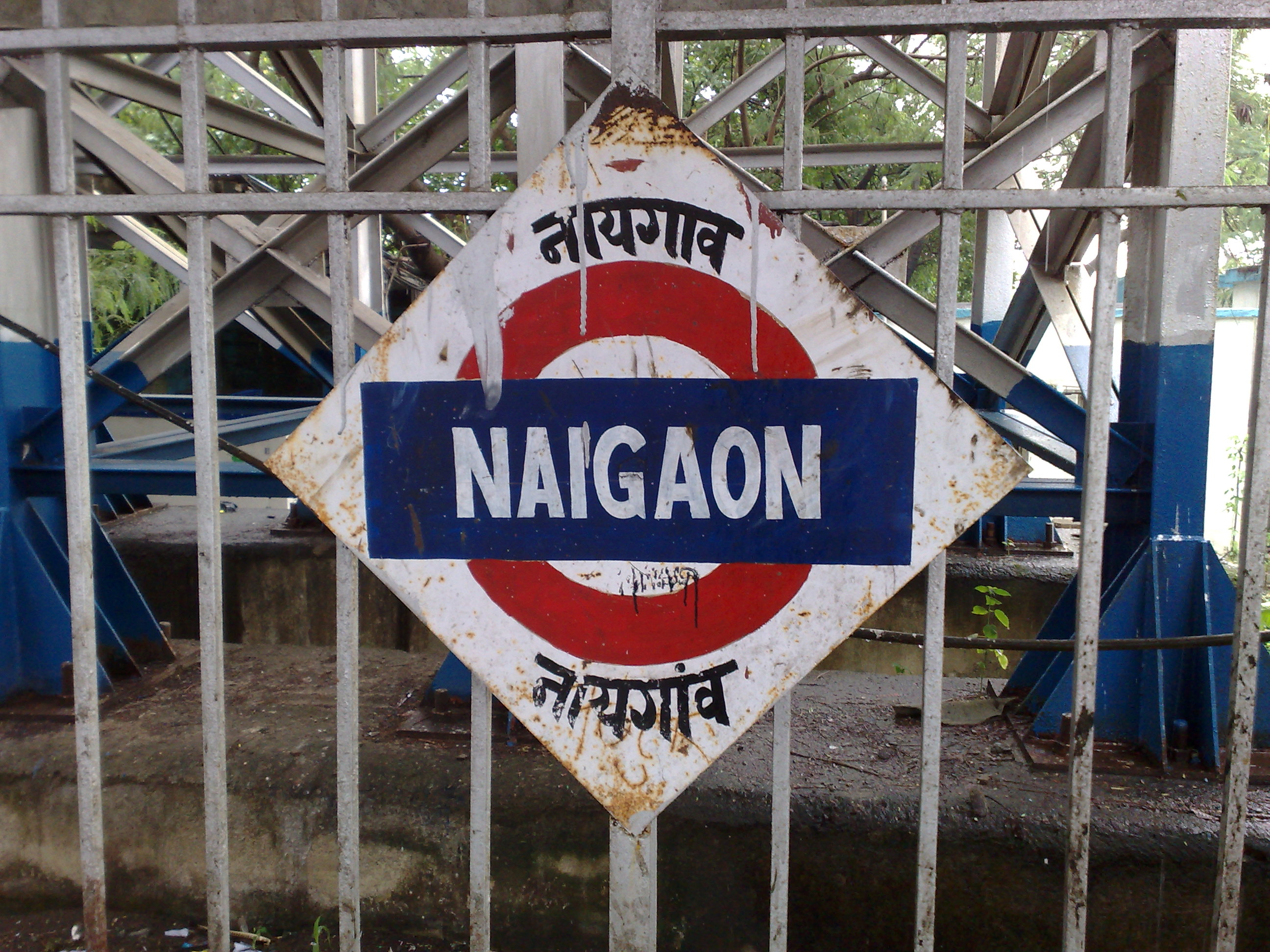
Naigaon station platform board
