= Juchandra railway station =

Railway Station in Maharashtra, India

Juchandra
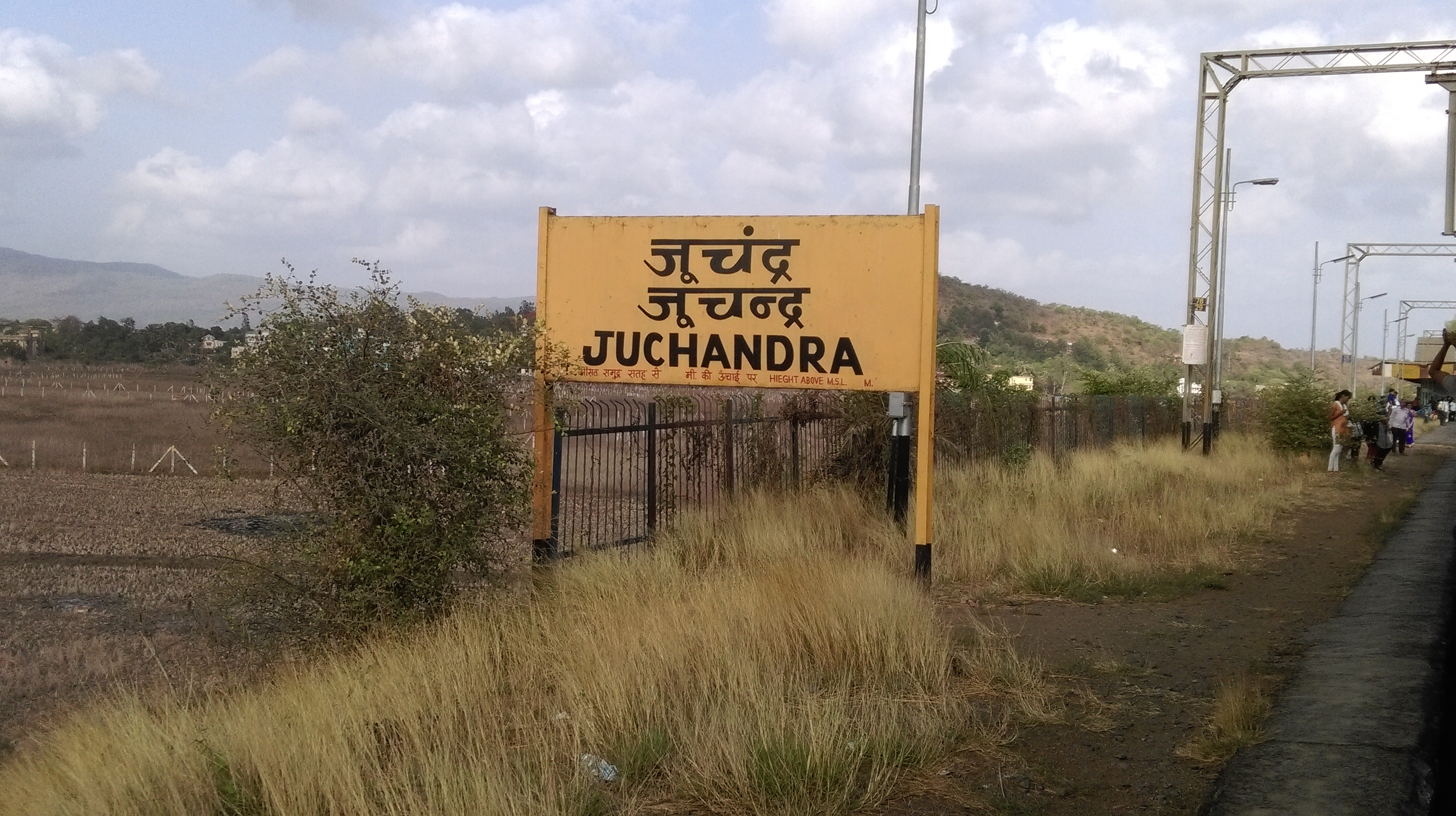

General information
- Coordinates: 19.360152°N 72.872712°E
- System: Indian Railways and Mumbai Suburban Railway station
- Owner: Ministry of Railways, Indian Railways
- Line: Vasai Road–Roha line

Construction
- Structure type: Standard on-ground station

Other information
- Status: Active
- Station code: JCNR
- Fare zone: Central Railways

Services
Preceding station	Mumbai Suburban Railway	Following station
Vasai Road Terminus	Vasai Road–Roha line	Kaman Road towards Roha
Route map
Location
- Location within India Location within Maharashtra

Juchandra is a railway station in Naigaon East on the Vasai Road-Diva Jn.-Panvel rail route of Central Railway of the Mumbai Suburban Railway Network.

Juchandra is a rail station after Kaman Road Rail Station in the south and before Vasai Road Rail Station in the north. Juchandra Railway Station is closely connected to Western Railway as well through Naigaon Railway Station. Naigaon and Juchandra Rail Stations are well connected by road through Naigaon-Juchandra Link Road. Juchandra Itself is a part of Greater Naigaon.
