= Colaba railway station =

Defunct railway station in Maharashtra, India

Colaba Railway Station

General information
- Coordinates: 18°54′58″N 72°49′29.5″E
- System: Mumbai Suburban Railway station
- Owner: Bombay, Baroda and Central India Railway
- Line: Western Line
- Platforms: 3

Construction
- Structure type: Standard on-ground station

History
- Opened: 1 October 1873
- Closed: 1 January 1931
- Rebuilt: 7 April 1896
Location
- Location within Mumbai

Colaba Railway Station was a railway station on the Bombay, Baroda and Central India Railway (BB&CI) located in Colaba in then South Bombay (now South Mumbai).

The original BB&CI terminus was at Grant Road. This was subsequently extended to Churchgate in 1870 and to Colaba, at the southern tip of the island, in 1873. However, by the 1920s, the Government of Bombay ordered the Railway to hand over the section between Churchgate and Colaba to facilitate the development of Backbay Reclamation project, now Nariman Point. After the new Bombay Central station was opened in 1930, the line between Churchgate and Colaba was closed and removed.

== The Old Station ==
By 1864, the BB&CI Railway established a foothold in the city, with its terminus at Grant Rd. The line was then extended to the Bombay Backbay station by 1866, and it started its regular local service to Viraur the following year. In the year 1872, the railway obtained permission from the Bombay Government to extend the line to Colaba, and to build a goods station. The station was built, but permission was provided only to erect only a semi-permanent structure mainly out of timber, this too on the condition that the 'railway' (line) would be shifted to some other location between Colaba and Marine Lines, if any further reclamation scheme was required so. This came into effect later, in 1930. According to a report from 29 September 1873, the station was opened to mainline passenger traffic from 1 October 1873.

== The Problems ==
As the passenger traffic grew, the station became cramped. Standing trains could only be accommodated at Grant rd, and it became necessary for three daily main line passenger trains to be taken back between Grant Rd and Colaba line, empty. To add to it, light engines had to move between Parel and Colaba continuously (since the shed was at Parel), hence affecting traffic. Also, often mainline trains had to be shunted off to provide space for Suburban trains, notably even before the passengers of the former could take their luggage out.

Thoughts were that this problem could be tackled by the provision of an additional siding at Marine Lines station, and making the station a terminus for long distance trains. In 1888, a government referred committee stated that this wasn't a 'satisfactory' arrangement, since it would be objected by people for using the limited area for recreation. Instead, it was recommended that expanding the station was the only permanent solution, and a block of land was provided to the railway between the Wodehouse Bridge road and Lower Colaba road. With plans and estimates of the building submitted, Rs. 4,94,843 were sanctioned by the Government in Council in April 1893, to construct a second Colaba terminus close to the site of the original station.

== The New Station ==
A new station was built on the site, and a new Colaba Station was opened on 7 April 1896. The new station was designed by the Resident Engineer and consisted of a stone facade and a carriage porch at the South, a tower with a pitch tiled roof was located at its southwest corner. There were open ticket counters, waiting rooms, and other offices. The station had three platforms, all about 500 ft long. Interestingly, the principal columns and other ironworks were created from old rails. There was a side wall on the Wodehouse Road side, constructed from brick, that would shelter passengers from the monsoon rain. The station was well lit with modern incandescent gas burner lights during both day and night. An overbridge was built at the northern end to serve as both a practical and an ornamental addition to the station.

Passengers alighting at Colaba Terminus

During a period of several remodeling schemes throughout the suburban line, Colaba also received attention. The signalling and yard arrangements were found inadequate, and finally a scheme was approved for the same in 1920.

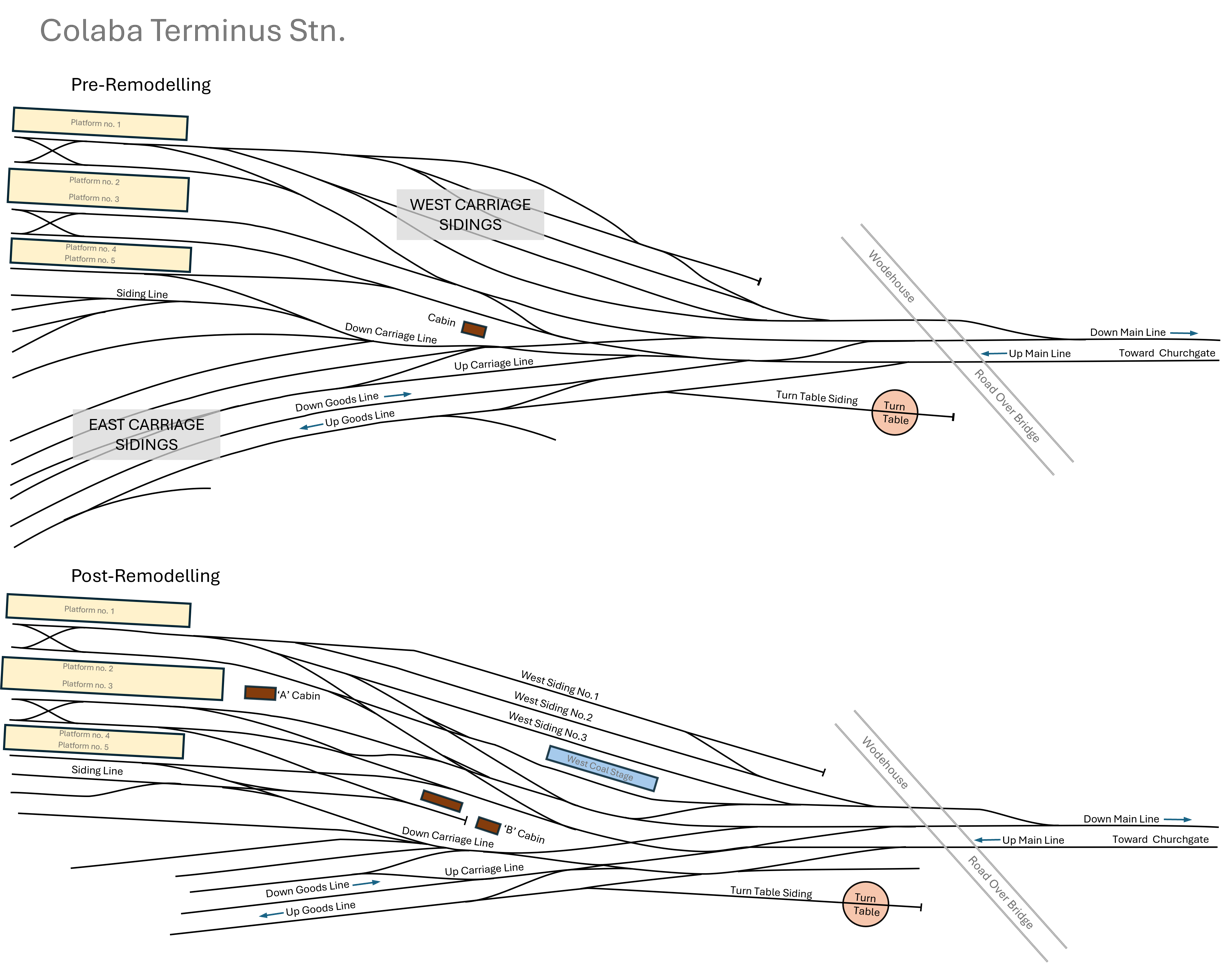
Colaba Terminus Remodelling Scheme Diagrams

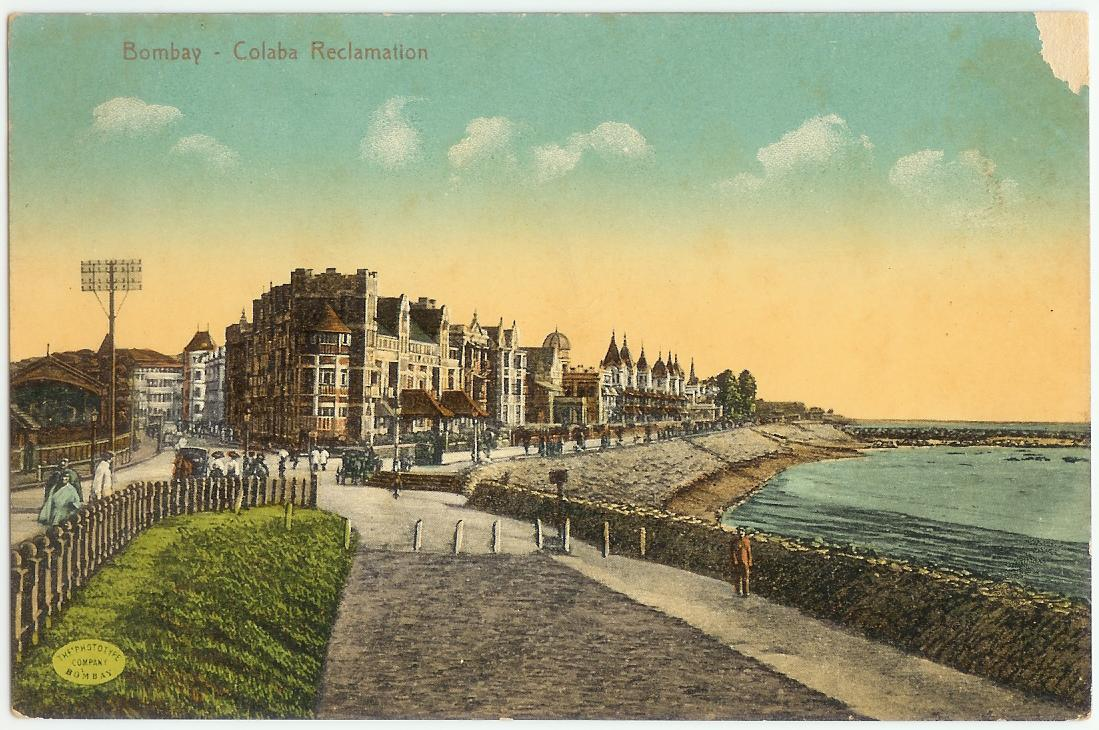
A postcard depicting the reclamation at Cuffe Parade. The station sheds can be seen at the extreme left.

== Reclamation and Demolition ==
In 1920s, when the Backbay Reclamation project was under progress, the government ordered that the section between Churchgate and Colaba be relinquished, to allow unrestricted access. A new terminus had to be built before this. A new terminus was built at Bellasis Rd, named Bombay Central, and opened on 18 December 1930.

Colaba Terminus ceased to exist after 1 January 1931. The section was dismantled by 1933, and the line then terminated at Churchgate.
