= Grant Road (South Mumbai, India) =

Neighborhood in South Mumbai, India

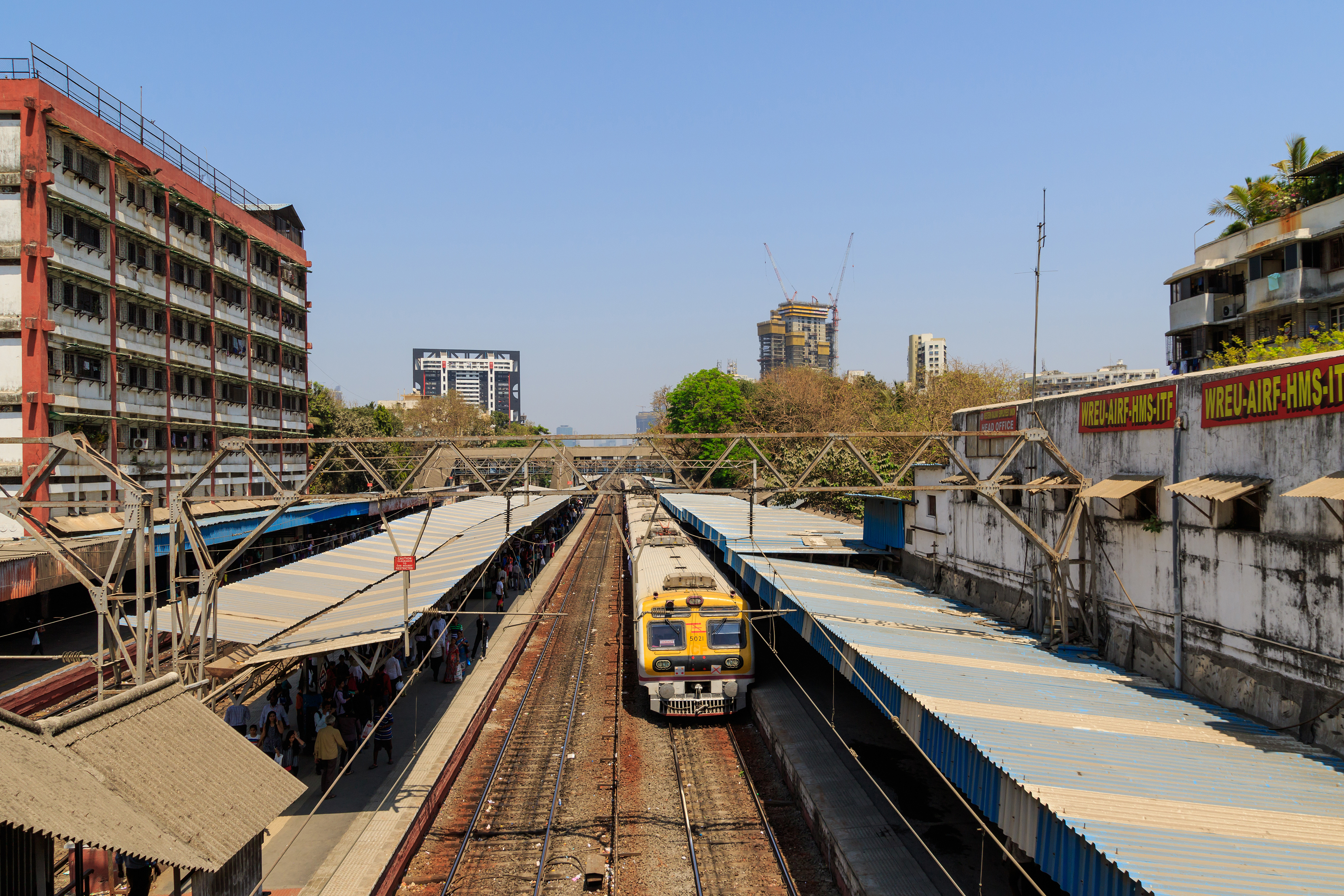
The Grant Road railway station on the Western Railway Line

Grant Road (named after Sir Robert Grant, the Governor of Bombay between 1835 and 1839, formally Maulana Shaukatali Road) is located in South Mumbai.

== Overview ==
Towards the west of the Grant Road station is Nana Chowk (named after Jagannath Shankarseth) and residential localities of Gamdevi, Raghav Wadi, Shastri Hall, Talmaki Wadi, Navi (New) Chikhal Wadi, Juni (Old) Chikhal Wadi, Bhaji Gully (the local vegetable market). To the east of Grant Road station is the retail electronic market of Bombay along Lamington Road. Grant Road station also connects famous Radha Gopinath Temple [ISKCON] at Chowpatty. Novelty cinema is at the junction of Grant Road with Lamington Road.

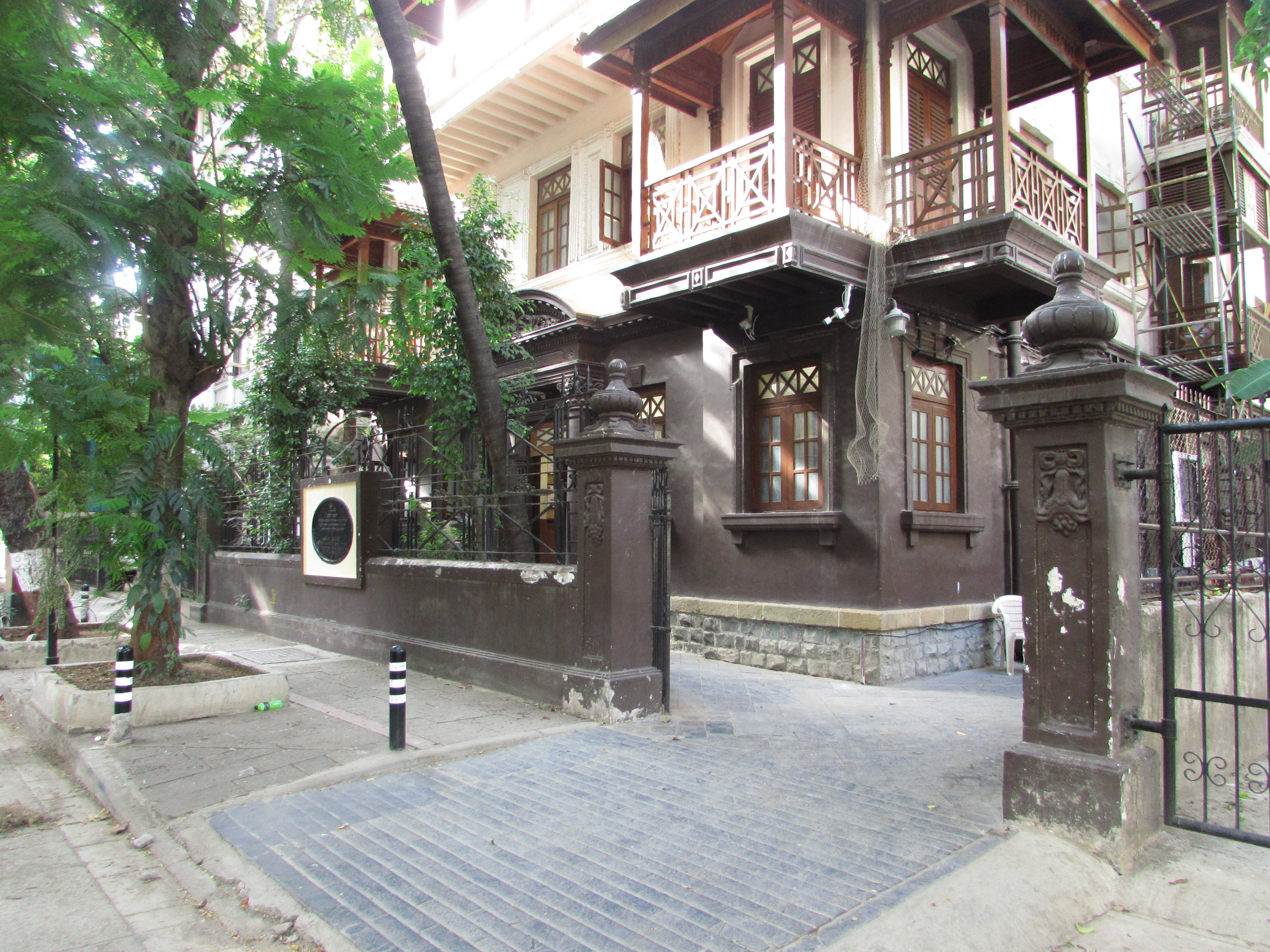
Mani Bhavan, which acted as Gandhiji's Mumbai headquarters for 17 years from 1917-1934

Famous places accessible to the West are Gowalia Tank (also known as August Kranti Maidan), Mani Bhavan at Gamdevi, Bhartiya Vidya Bhavan, Bhavan's College, Wilson College, Girgaum Chowpatty and Walkeshwar. Famous places accessible from the East are Gol Deol off Duncan Road, Chor Bazaar on Mutton Street, Hurkisondas Hospital, Prathana Samaj, Badr Baug.

Grant Road along with Tardeo and Mumbai Central has been a neighbourhood of Mumbai City dominated by the Hindus, Jains, Muslims and the Parsi & Irani Zoroastrians. It is considered as the place of ancestral roots of the originating Zoroastrians of the city mainly being the areas of Balaram Street and Sleater Road. It has 4 Fire temples and The Cama Baug is an important place for the Wedding Ceremonies and other functions of the Parsis of Mumbai.

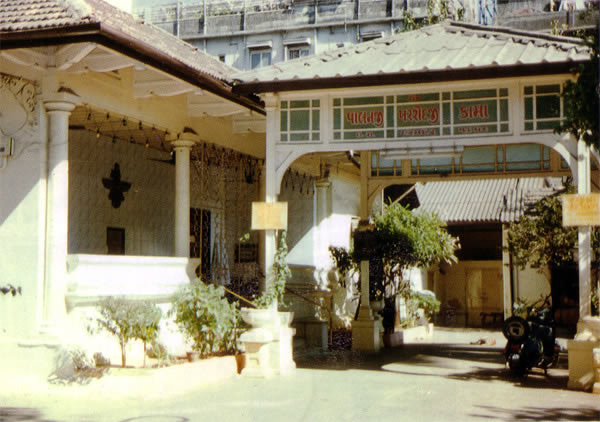
Cama Baug Fire Temple

The Gilder Tank is one of the oldest tanks in the city originating the roots of Yazdani, Cooper and the Gilder Families of Mumbai. B'Merwan Cake Shop and Bakery is one of the oldest bakeries in the City of Mumbai which has catered to nearly all classes of people from students and mill workers Grant Road is famous for its electronic items purchase at Lamington Road. Sir H.N. Reliance Foundation Hospital and Research Centre is one of the most important and oldest hospitals in the city of Mumbai. It is also an access point to the Tower of Silence at Kemps Corner which is the only remaining one after the closure of the dakhma at Andheri's Salsette Parsi Colony on the Salsette Island and even the Wilson College.

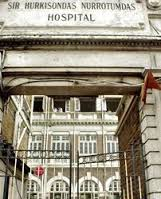
Hurkisondas Hospital

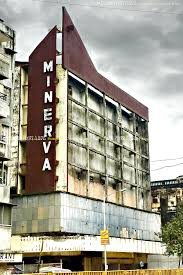
Minerva Cinema

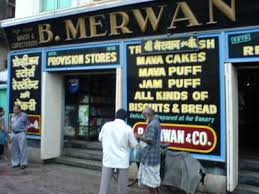
B.Merwan Bakey

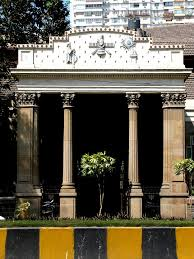
Sethna Agiary

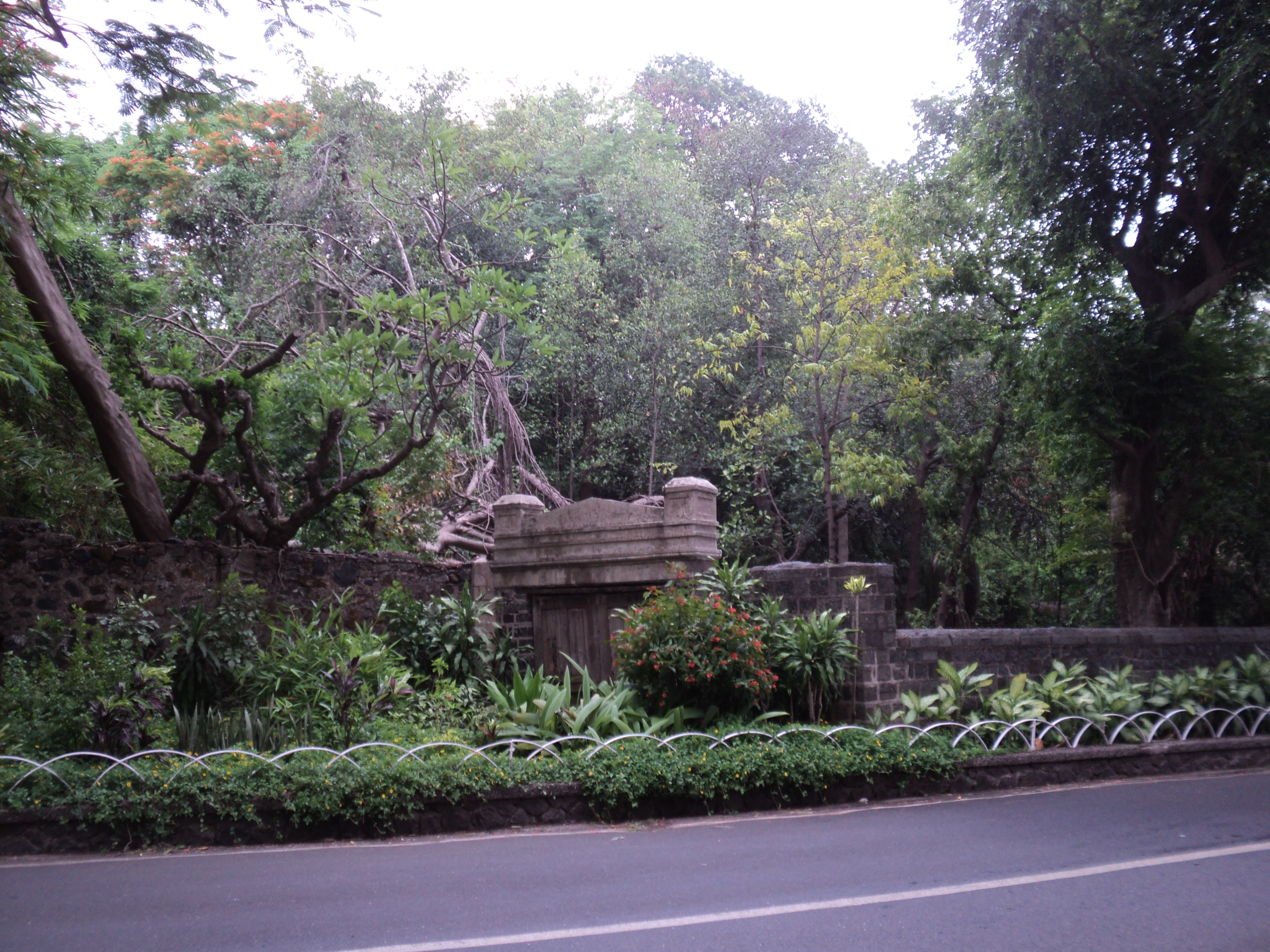
The Tower of Silence {Doongerwadi} at Kemps Corner

It is among the access points towards the residential areas of Gamdevi and Walkeshwar, Gowalia Tank

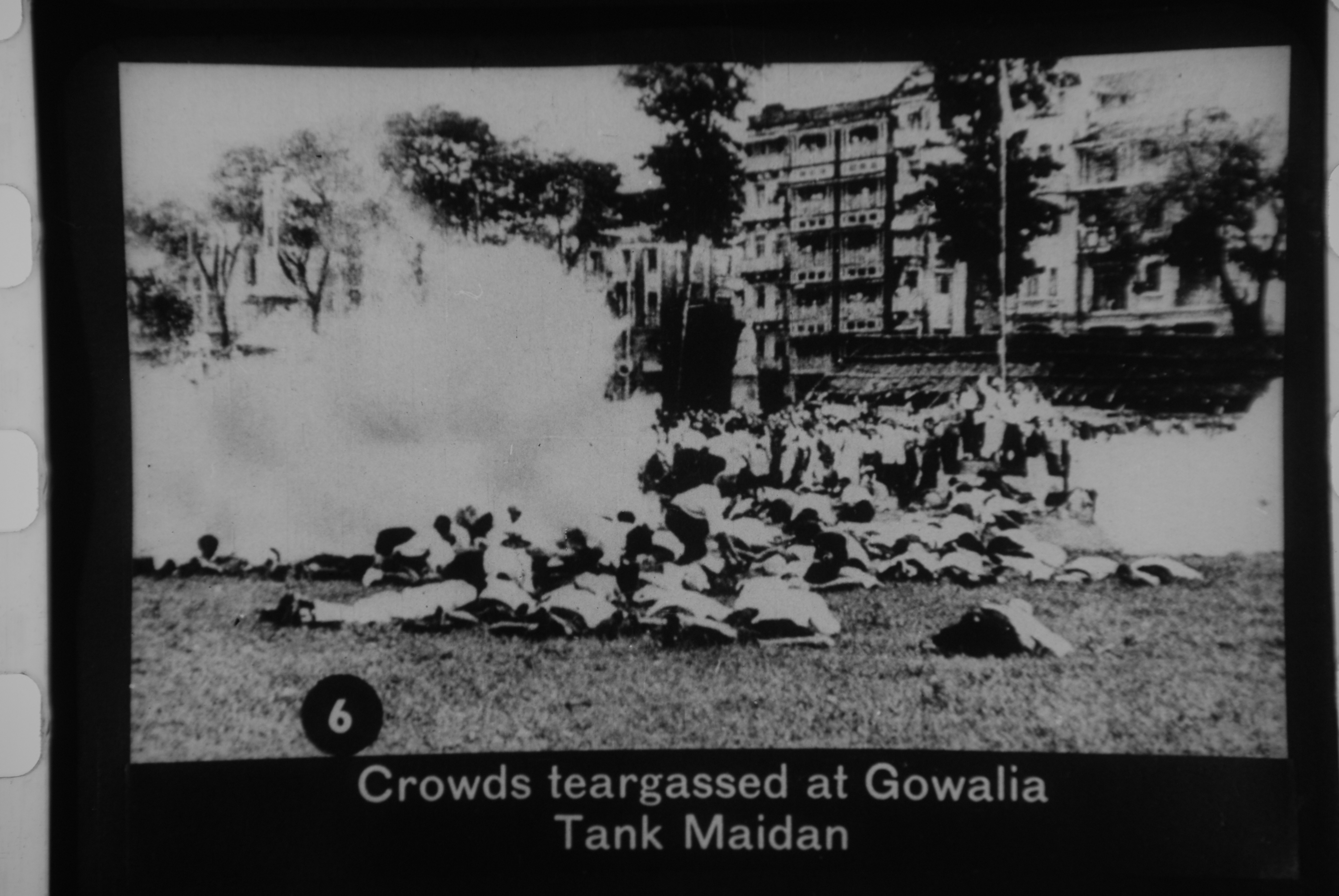
Gowalia Tank where the Quit India Movement took place

Grant Road had a number of theatres until 2004, namely the Novelty Cinema (now apartments), Super Cinema, Apsara, Jamuna, Minerva, Royal Talkies, New Roshan Talkies, Nishat Cinema, Naaz Cinema, Imperial Cinema, Krishna Cinema, Alfred Theatre and Shalimar Cinema.

The Zoroastrian Shoppe near Cama Baug and the Appo Menes and Company are one of the oldest surviving Zoroastrian shops in the city which caters to the traditional weaving of Sudreh Kasti and other religious items to the Zoroastrian Community of Bombay City.

The Grant Road Skywalk is the latest addition to the skywalks of Mumbai due to its round architecture.

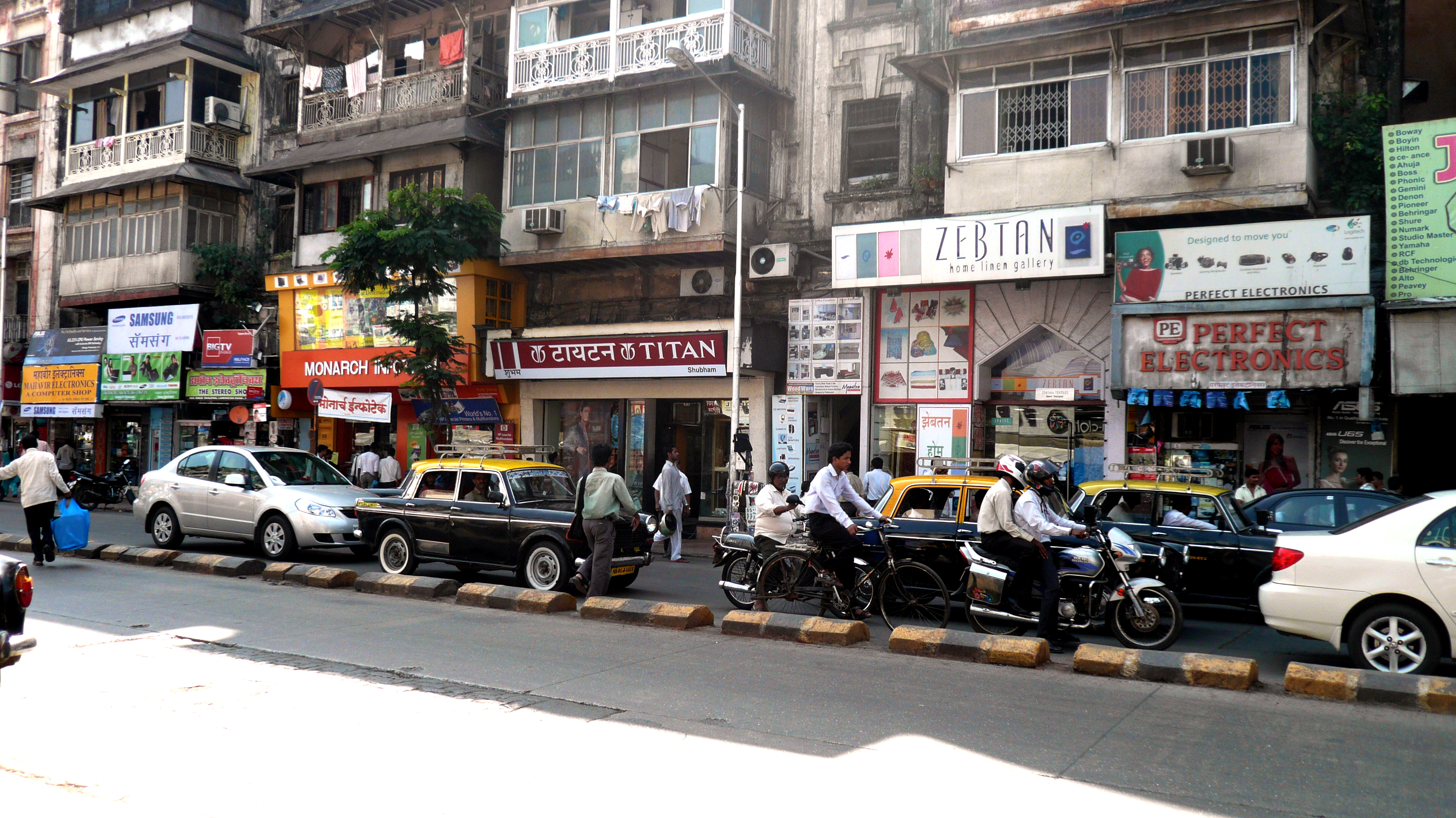
Lamington Road, the busiest electronic street of the city of Bombay

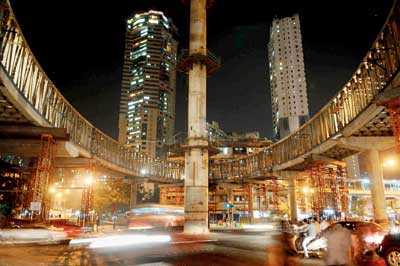
Grant Road Skywalk is the latest addition to the area and an iconic one in the city of Bombay

Grant Road is also known for its Irani Cafes like the B'Merwan and the Persian Bakery & Stores at Balaram Street.

The Sheetal Store on Malauna Shaukatali Road is one of the oldest surviving saree stores in this area.

== Grant Road Station ==
Grant Road railway station serves this area. Grant Road is the fourth station on the Western local line preceded by Churchgate, Marine Lines, Charni Road, and followed by a main junction, Mumbai Central. Most slow trains halt at this station, which is useful for people who want to reach the Royal Opera House, Nana Chowk, Lamington Road, and the Roxy Theatre.
