= Charni =

Charni may refer to:

- Charni Road, a neighbourhood in Mumbai, India
  - Charni Road railway station
- Charni Ekangamene (born 1994), Belgian football player
- Olfa Charni, Tunisian pistol shooter

== See also ==
- Charn
- Charnia
