= Geology of Mumbai =

Geology of Mumbai refers to the geology of the city of the island city of Mumbai.

Back Bay and Bandra reclamation are the major reclamation areas of Mumbai in the Arabian sea.

== Soil ==
The predominant soil cover in Mumbai city is sandy, whereas in the suburban district, the soil cover is alluvial and loamy.

Land Usage	Mumbai city district (area in km^{2}. and %)	Mumbai suburban district (area in km^{2}. and %)
Inhabited area	53.84, 79.45%	277.5, 75%
Agricultural area	Nil	18.5, 5%
Industrial area	13.5, 19.9%	41.0, 11.69%
Forest Cover	0.4543, 0.7%	33.0, 8.31%
Wastelands	Nil	Nil
Total:	67.79 km^{2}	370 square kilometres
Source:Relief and rehabitation (Mumbai)		
