= Pransukhlal Mafatlal Hindu Swimming Bath and Boat Club =

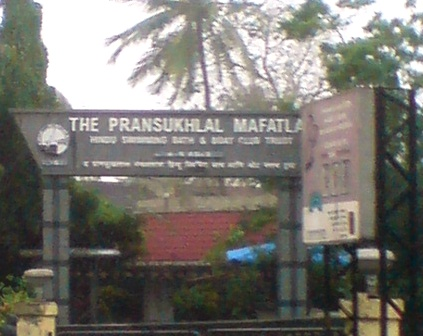
The entrance of the club

Pransukhlal Mafatlal Hindu Swimming Bath and Boat Club is a Swimming and Boating club in Mumbai that is run by Pransuklal Mafatlal Hindu Swimming Bath and Boat Club Trust. It is located at Girgaum Chowpatty near Charni Road Station.

Until 1964 only whites were allowed to enter the Breach Candy Swimming Pool (which is not the same as the PM Bath).

Until 2011 only Hindus were allowed to enter the PM Bath premises.
