= Charni Road railway station =

Railway station in Maharashtra, India

Charni Road

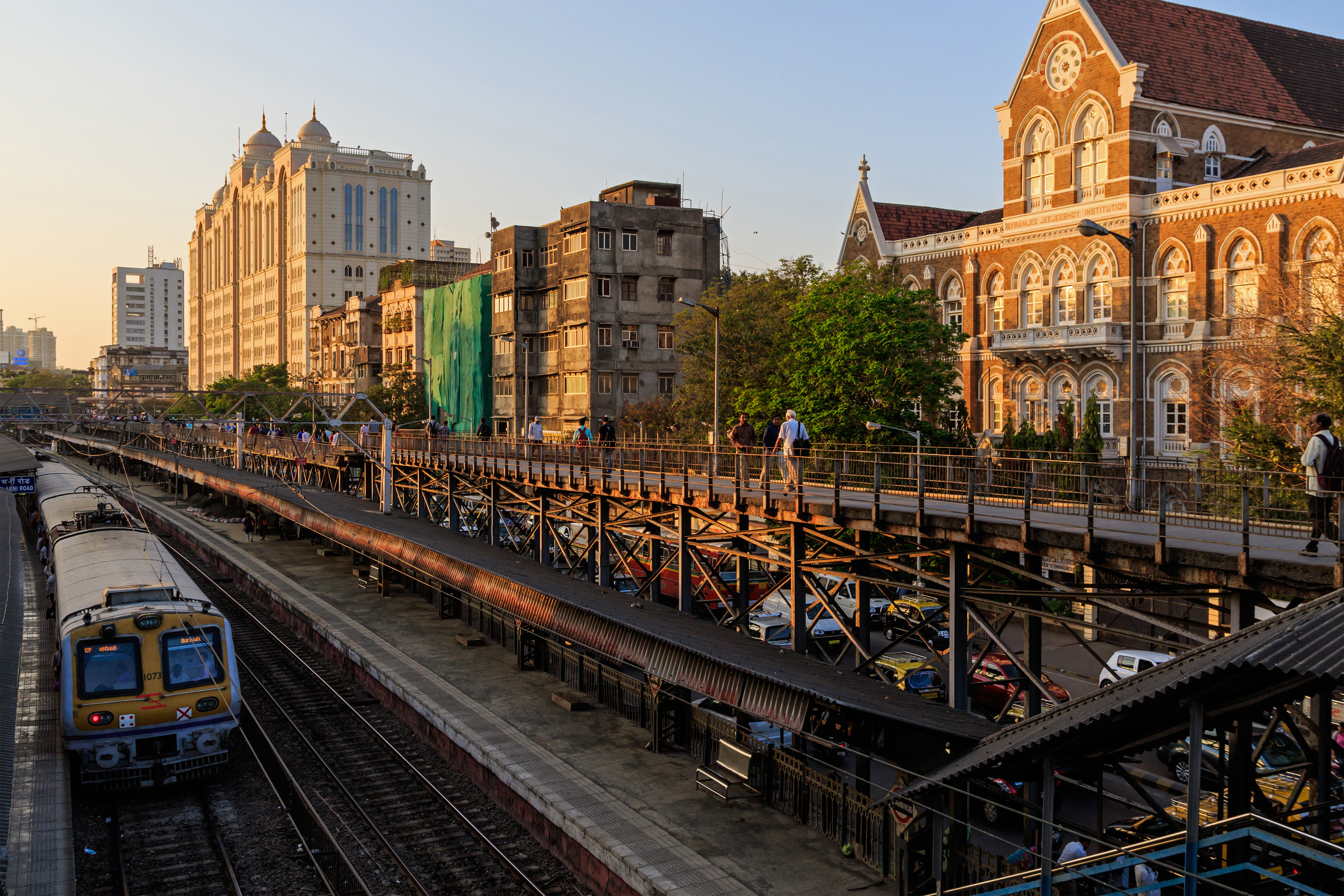

General information
- Coordinates: 18.951565°N 72.818633°E
- System: Mumbai Suburban Railway station
- Owner: Ministry of Railways, Indian Railways
- Line: Western Line
- Platforms: 4
- Tracks: 4

Construction
- Structure type: Standard on-ground station

Other information
- Status: Active
- Station code: CYR
- Fare zone: Western Railways

History
- Opened: 3 September 1868

Services
Preceding station	Mumbai Suburban Railway	Following station
Marine Lines towards Churchgate	Western line	Grant Road towards Dahanu Road
Route map
Location
- Location within Mumbai

Churney Road (station code: CYR) railway station is on the Western Line of the Mumbai Suburban Railway in South Mumbai, Maharashtra. It serves the suburb of Charni Road. The next station south is Marine Lines Station; the next station north is Grant Road Station. Southbound fast locals stop at Charni Road but skip the station during the evening peak hours (17:00 to 20:00). The main significance of Charni Road station is that it is near the Girgaum Chowpatty beach and Marine Drive promenade, a major destination for tourists in Mumbai. It is also important because of the diamond trading industry located here, mainly in the Panchratna and Prasad chambers building near the railway station.

== History ==
The BB&CI Railway (precursor to the Western Railway) commenced regular suburban services from Back Bay to Virar from 12 April 1867. The station was itself opened on 3 September 1868.

Passenger traffic on the station increased by 1890, and a local newspaper, The Gujarati reported that as there was just one booking office for both the Up and Down passengers, it would frequently happen that some passengers would not be able to get their tickets in time, and therefore unable to board their trains. It was suggested that an additional booking office be opened either on the town line, or somewhere in Bhuleshwar.

== Surroundings ==
Today Charni road is well known for its old charm Chawls, wholesale markets of diamonds (Opera House), garments, Irani cafés traditional Maharashtrian culture (Girgaon) and also tall skyscrapers. It is not only famous for skyscrapers and Chowpatty but also attracts crowds because of the religious places built in it (Mumbadevi temple) and also the famous celebration of Gudipadva and Ganesh Chaturthi festival in Girgaon. Also the famous Hinduja College of commerce and economics have been set up by Hinduja group in 1974.

For information about the area, see Charni Road.

== Gallery ==
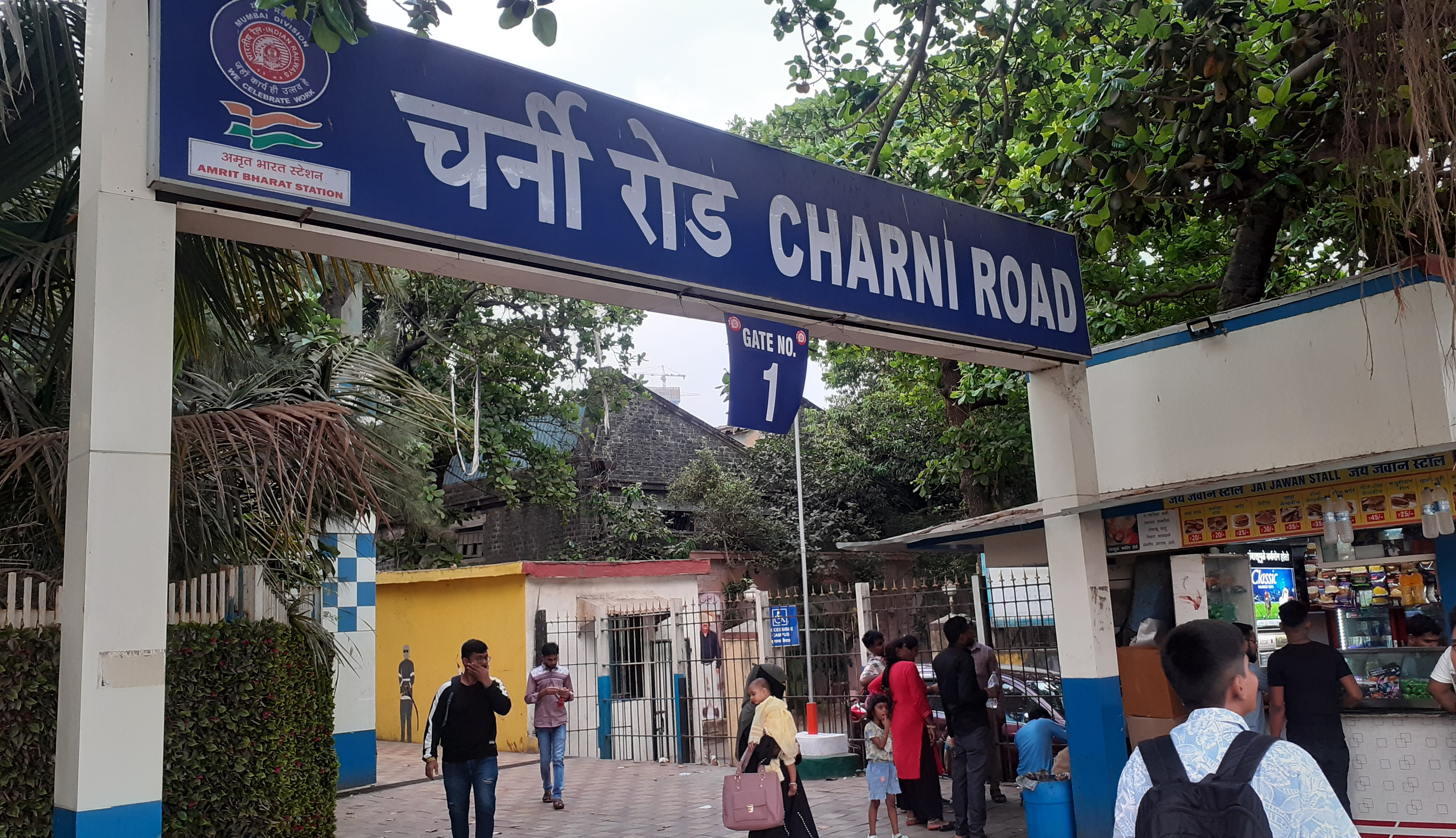
Charni Rd stationː Entrance to Platform 1

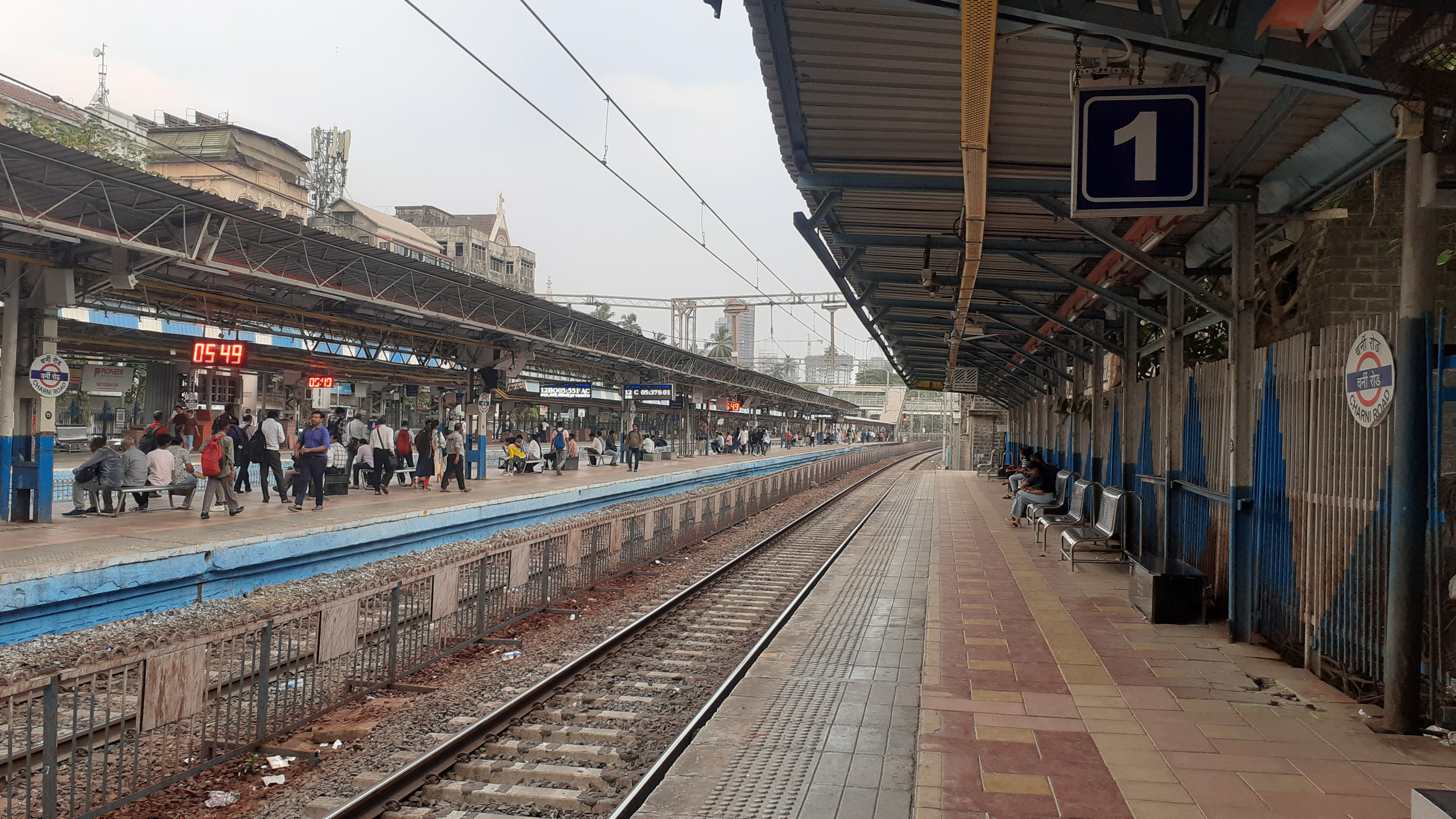
Charni Rd stationː Platform view, looking toward Churchgate

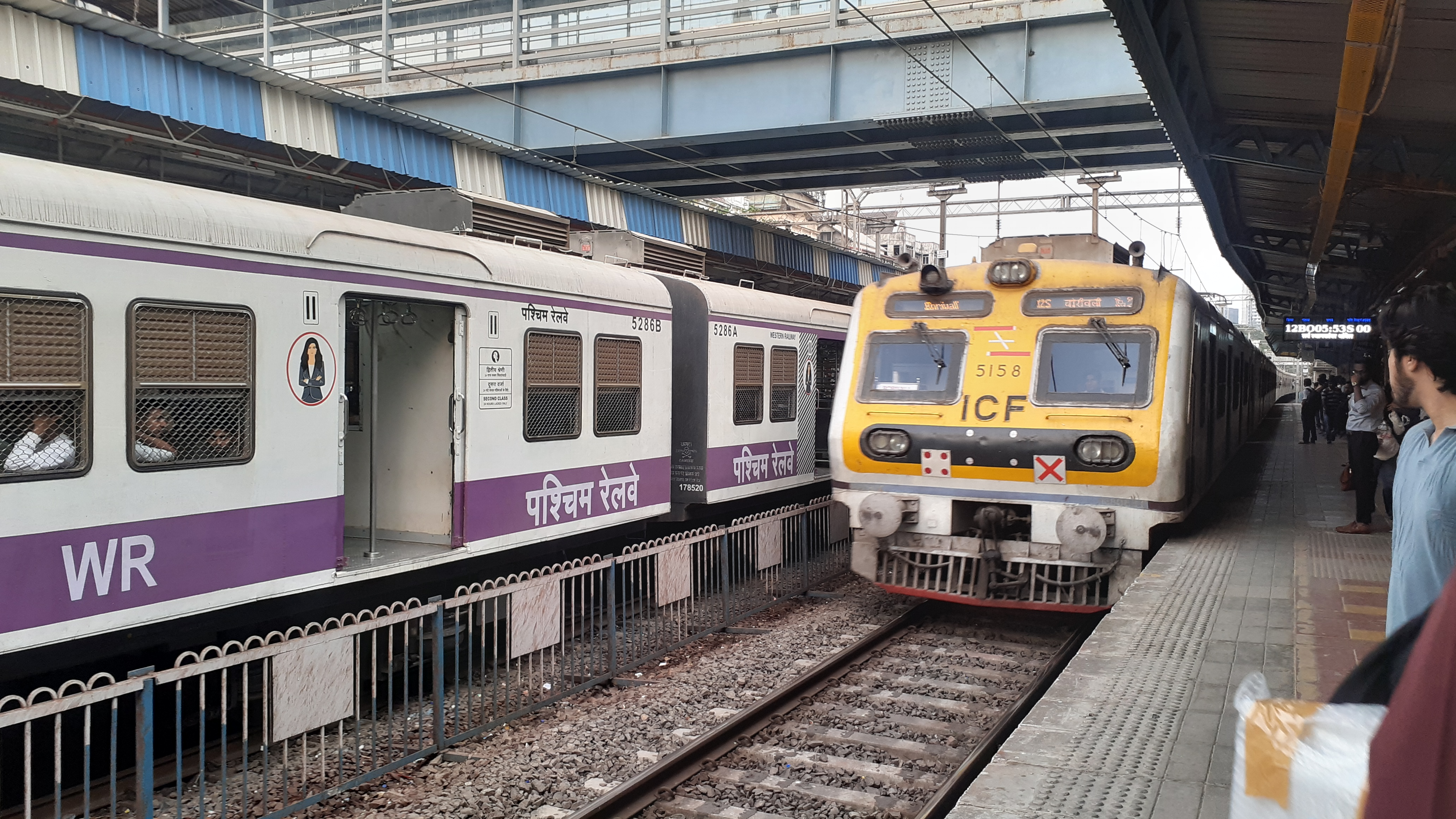
Local Train entering Charni Rd Platform 1

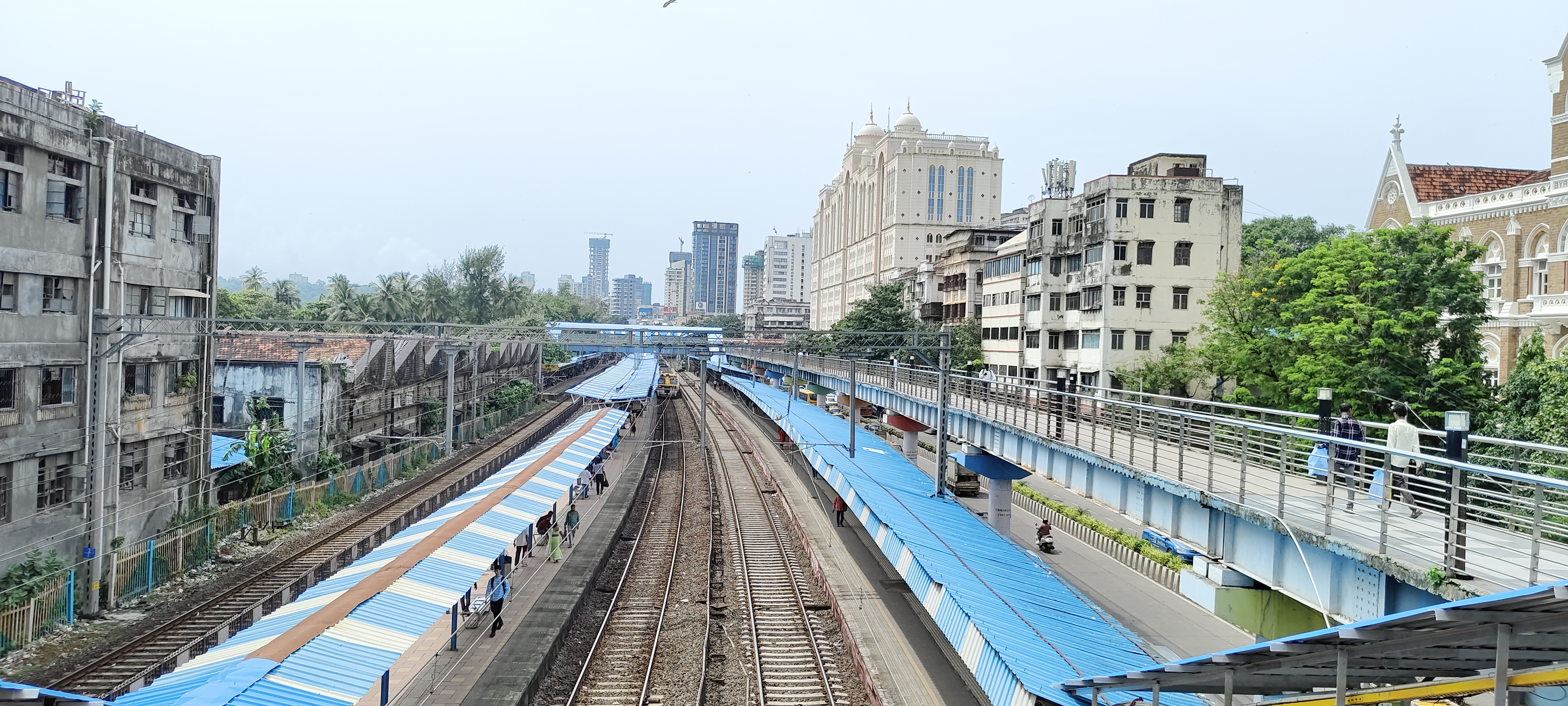
Northward view of Charni Rd station from FoB

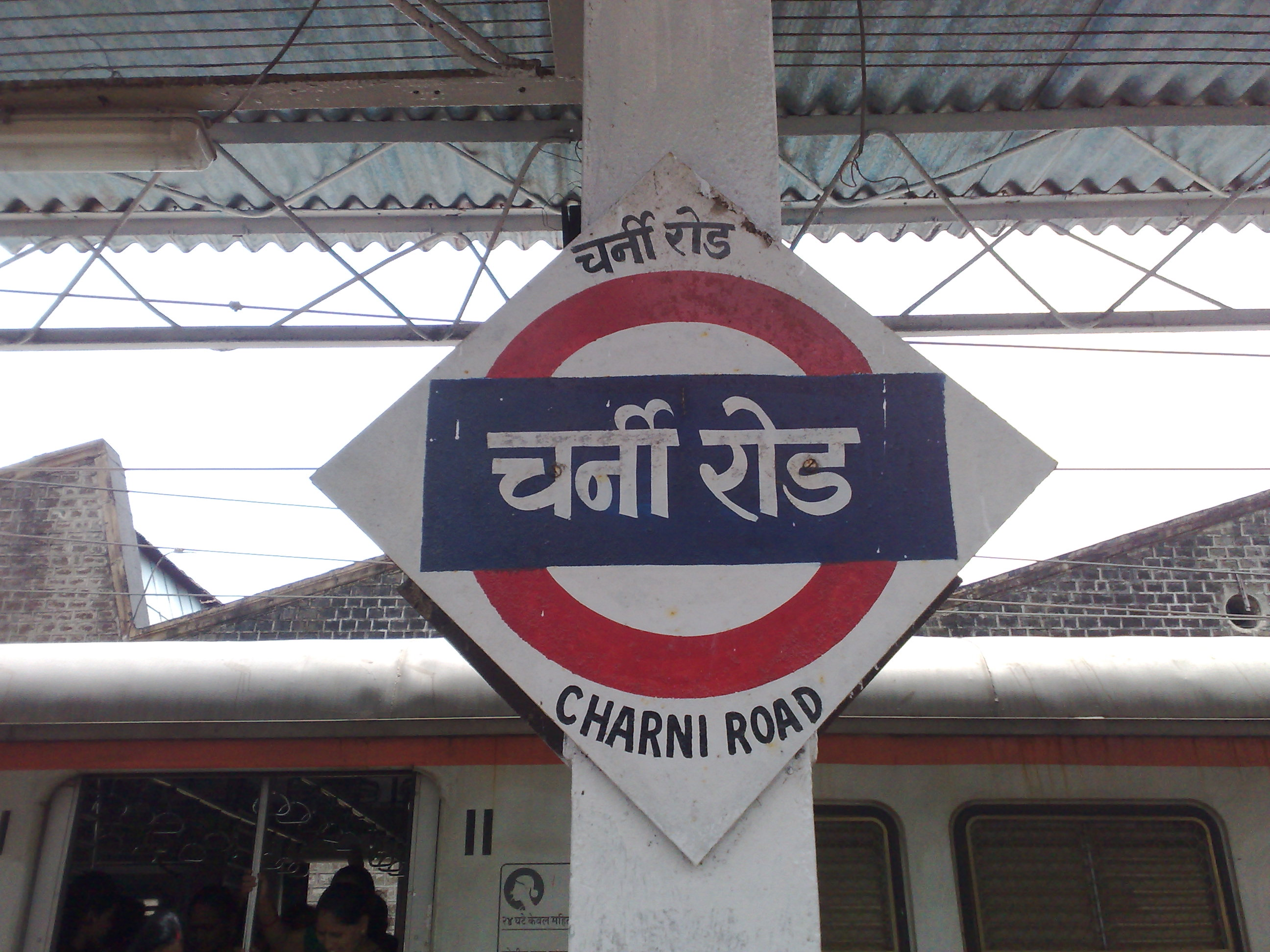
Charni Rd platform board
