= Royal Opera House, Mumbai =

Opera house in Mumbai, India

Royal Opera House
- "theatre-de-luxe of the East"
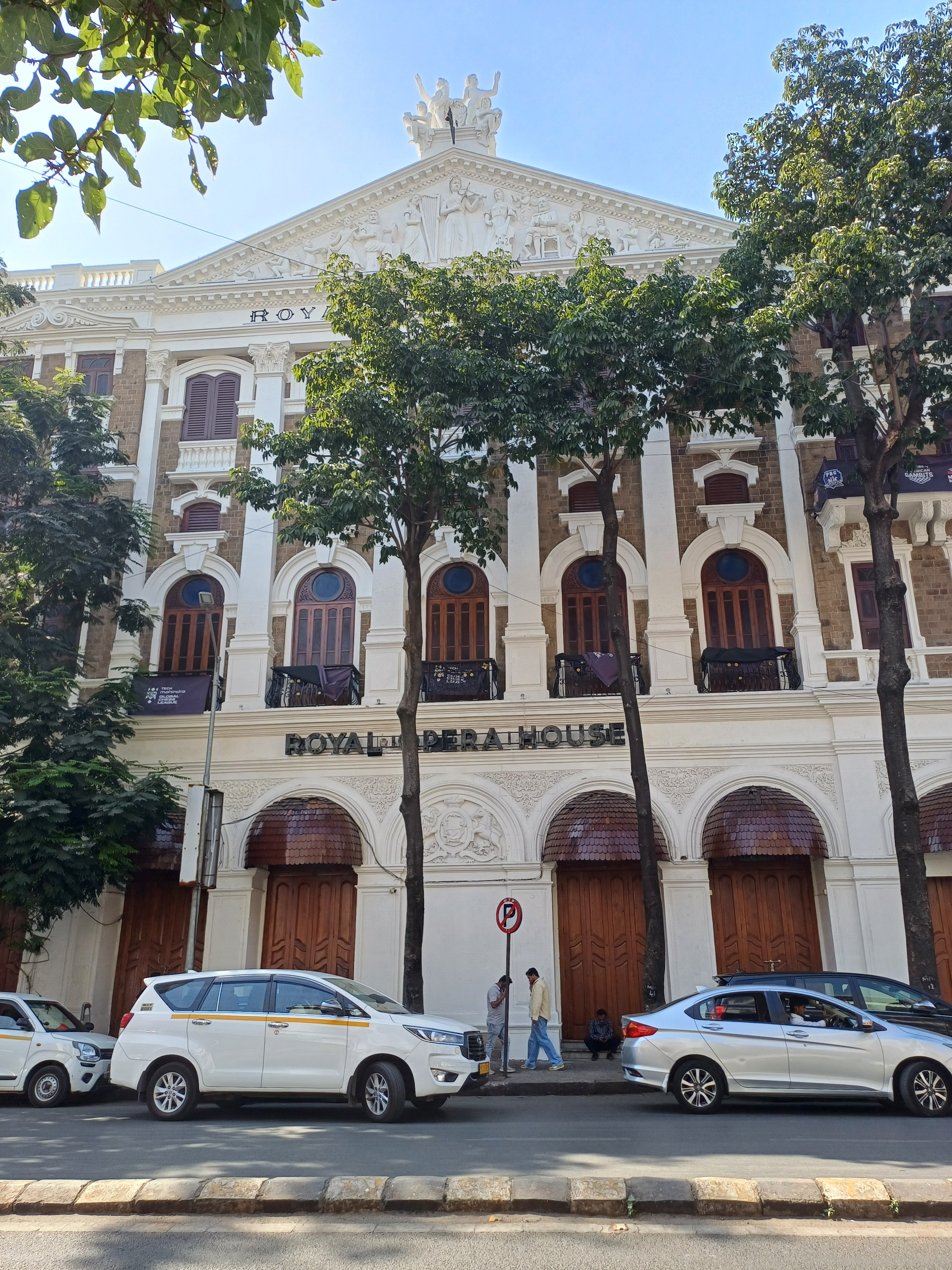
- Façade of The Royal Opera House
- Interactive map of Royal Opera House
- Coordinates: 18.956111°N 72.815556°E
- Capacity: 575
- Type: Opera house
- Public transit: Charni Road; Girgaon

Construction
- Groundbreaking: 1909; 117 years ago
- Opened: 1911; 115 years ago
- Renovated: 2016; 10 years ago
- Architects: Maurice Bandmann & Jehangir Framji Karaka

Website
- https://www.royaloperahouse.in/

Royal Opera House, in Mumbai (Bombay), is India's only surviving opera house.

Situated on Charni Road, near Girgaum Chowpatti beach, the adjective ‘Royal’ was prefixed to ‘Opera House’ to highlight that its foundation stone was laid during the British Raj in 1909, and King George V inaugurated the building in 1911 while the building was still under construction. Work on the Royal Opera House was completed in 1912, although additions were made to the building up to 1915. Gradually, the entire area near it came to be referred as "Opera House", and the building began hosting plays, dramas, music concernts and gradually, Hindi films. It became a popular venue for Bollywood film shows in the 1970s and 80s.

In the 1980s, as home video players began to get popular, cinema houses in Mumbai started to register losses. In the 1990s, with the growing popularity of cable television, cinema houses in Mumbai began to close down due to a lack of clientele. In 1993, Opera house closed down.

However, after years of neglect following its closure in 1993, restoration work started in 2008. The exterior restoration was completed in 2011 and restoration was completed in 2016. The area around the theatre is also referred to as the Opera House in Mumbai. The Opera House area has many jewellery, metal and IT companies. On 21 October 2016, after a gap of 23 years, Royal Opera House hosted performance of Bombay-born British soprano Patricia Rozario and her husband, pianist Mark Troop. The private event was organised by Opera House owners Maharaja Joytendrasinhji Jadeja and Maharani Kumud Kumari Jadeja of Gondal, Gujarat. In 2017, it received the UNESCO Asia-Pacific Award for Cultural Heritage Conservation.

== Ownership ==
Inaugurated in 1912, the Opera House was acquired in 1952 by Maharaja Bhojrajsingh of Gondal. The Maharaja took the property on a 999-year lease and attempted to run it as a self-sustaining commercial enterprise.

== History ==
The Royal Opera House was conceived in 1908 by Maurice Bandmann, a famous entertainer from Calcutta, and Jehangir Framji Karaka, who headed a coal brokers’ firm. A baroque design incorporating a blend of European and Indian detailing was chosen for the structure. A long frontage was created to let carriages drive up to the entrance. Twenty-six rows of boxes behind the stalls were put up for the best view of the stage. The ceiling was constructed to enable even those in the gallery to hear every word uttered by the performers.

Initially, the opera house was used strictly for staging operas, and catered almost exclusively to the city's elite – a globalised layer of Indians, British officials, a few Europeans. After the first world war, times and tastes changed and it became difficult to maintain and run the opera house, a sumptuous building, on the income from the opera alone. Also, with the coming of "talkie" movies in the early 1930s, the popularity of cinema increased. In 1935, the opera house was modified to accommodate movie screenings and fashion shows.

=== 1980s and closure in 1991 ===
Single-theatre cinemas took a downturn in the 1980s, and as a result the opera house ran at a loss. In the 1980s the opera house was closed down. In January 1991, the opera house hosted its last film show. In 1993 the Kathiawad fashion show became the last public event held at the opera house.

=== Revival in 21st century ===
Subsequently, it was in a dilapidated condition but in March 2008 the Maharashtra Government agencies announced that they were undertaking conservation measures to restore the heritage structure to its original grandeur. When restoration began, the only operational wings of the opera house were a tea stall and shops on the ground floor.

== Structure ==
The Opera House is built in a mixed classical design featuring a blend of European and Indian architectural styles. The design was conceived in 1908 by Maurice Bandmann, an entertainer from Kolkata and his partner Jehangir Framji Karaka, who was the head of a firm of coal brokers. It was built with exquisite Italian marble on a leased land close to the Kennedy and Sandhurst bridges. Although the work was completed in 1912, several additions were made until 1915. The pediment figure at the pinnacle was substituted with three cherubs. A pair of unique crystal chandeliers, called the ‘Sans Souci’ were donated by the Sassoon family. The chandeliers, which were earlier located in the Sassoon mansion, were shifted to the foyer of the opera house. At the main entrance, the dome is segmented into eight different parts "as a tribute to poets, dramatists, novelists, literati and people from art and culture". The original interior of the opera house consisted of orchestra stalls with cosy cane chairs. Behind the stalls were 26 rows of boxes with couches. The seating enabled a clear view of the stage to all the people seated in the stalls and in the Dress Circle. The acoustics were of the opera house were created by shaping the ceiling in a manner that permitted distinct audibility that allowed the audience seated in the gallery to hear every word or song from the stage. The entrance was originally designed with a frontage for carriages to drive in.

== Past events ==
Since its inauguration in 1912, the opera house has been a landmark of Bombay, as the only opera house in the country. The entertainment extravaganza at the opera house was started by American magician Raymond followed by several premieres of famous Hindi movies. It also showcased ragtime and other styles of native western music through the 1910s and 1920s. The opera house screened not only premieres of Hindi movies but also live theatre performances by the French production Pathé, Prithviraj Kapoor, and Marathi stalwarts like Bal Gandharva and Dinanath Mangeshkar. Lata Mangeshkar, a renowned play back singer gave her first performance at this opera house. In 1993, Fashion designer Sangita Kathiwada, a relative of Jyotinder Singh, the former Maharaja of Gondal State (the owner of the place), held a fashion show at the opera house. It was the last public event held at the Opera House.

== Restoration measures ==
Initially, in May 2001, it was noted that since the opera house was a Heritage building, it could not be redeveloped but only restored. Even for restoration, funds needed to be found. With these two basic aspects in view, the planning dictum followed was that:

The historicity of the building and its architecture will be lost if it is not used as a theatre and there should not be a change of user.

The initial plan proposed was to convert a part of the open plot to be developed commercially to generate funds, which could self sustain the expenditure involved in the restoration and maintenance of the existing heritage building. To proceed further with this plan, it was also considered essential to negotiate with the existing owner Maharaja Vikramsinghji Bhojraji of Gondal to get his consent to the incentive plan.

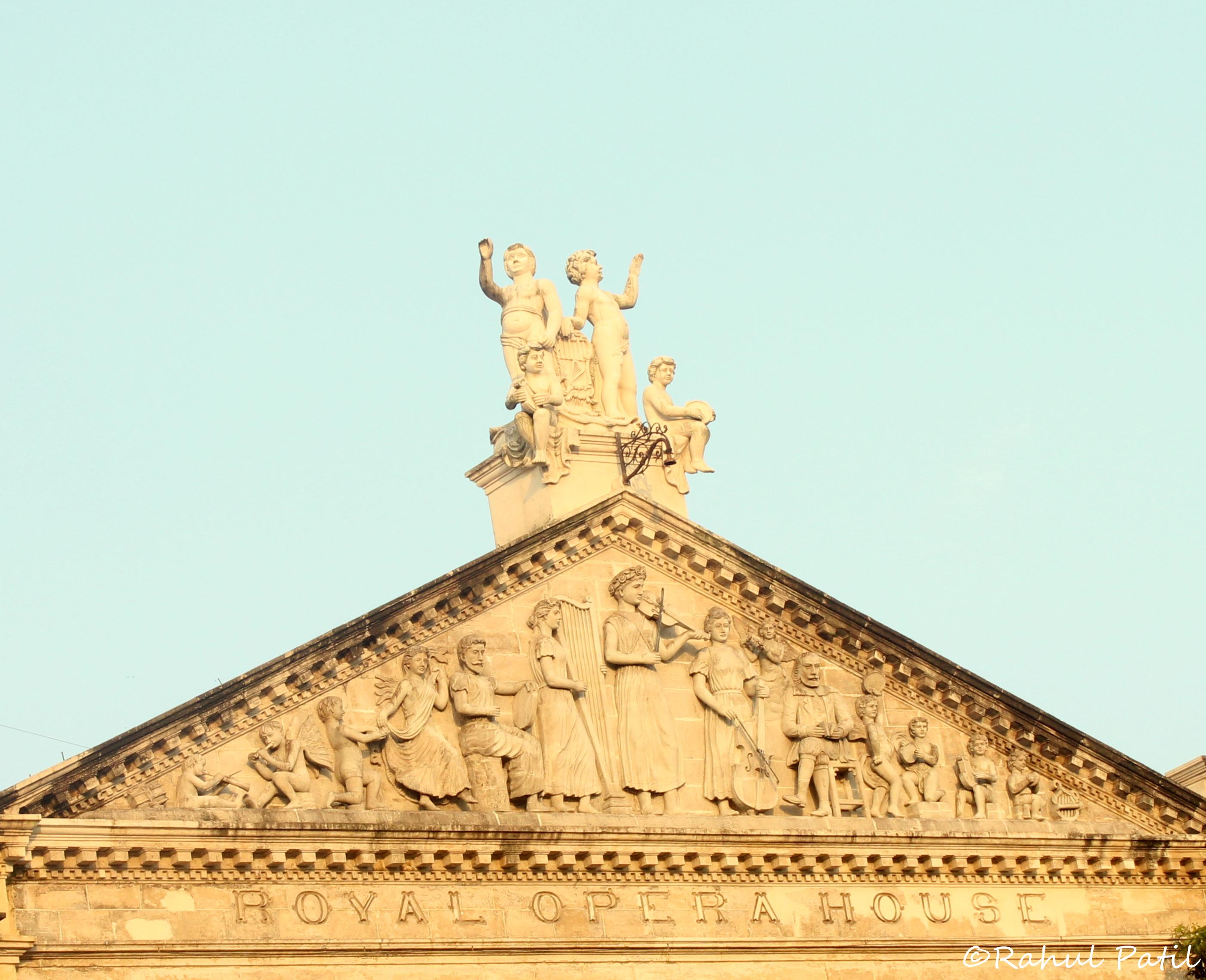
Restored top portion of the Opera House building in 2012

The Maharashtra State Government wanted to take over the Opera House to restore it to its original grandeur. The government requested the Mumbai Urban Heritage Conservation Committee (MUHCC) to acquire the heritage structure after verifying its legal status. The MUHCC had already been entrusted with the task of preparing plans for restoration of the opera house as it was categorised as a Grade II Heritage Structure. The detailed proposal for conservation was prepared by well known conservation architects of Mumbai. In May 2008, MUHCC authorised Abha Narain Lambah and her associates to carry out the structural stabilisation of the building and its restoration. Abha, the architect, considers the restoration of the Opera House as her dream project and states:

It's such a stunning building. Restoring the building would be a dream come true for me.

As restoration began, repairs to the roof and the balconies of the structure were deemed to be of the highest priority. With the conservation works undertaken, the erstwhile Maharaja of Gondal expects that the structure's original grandeur will be restored. By late 2011, exterior restoration was mostly completed. Thereafter, the World Monuments Fund (WMF) announced the inclusion of the building in its 2012 global list of endangered architectural sites, with the only other building in Mumbai being Watson's Hotel. In January 2013, Mumbai Heritage Conservation Committee (MHCC) approved the plans of the Gondal family to restore and revamp the buildings interiors.
