= Grant Road railway station =

Railway Station in Maharashtra, India

Grant Road

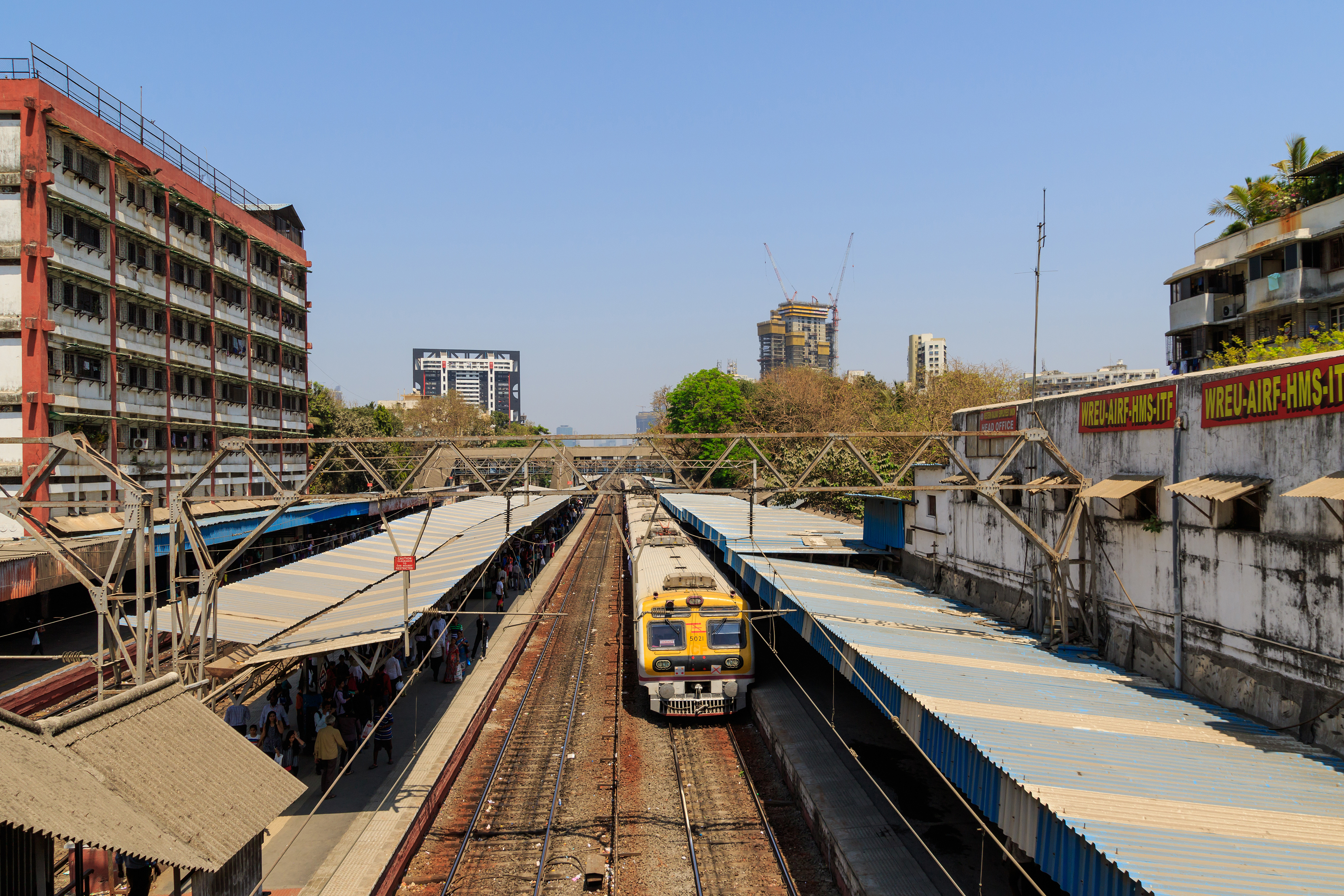

General information
- Coordinates: 18.9634°N 72.8161°E
- System: Mumbai Suburban Railway station
- Owner: Ministry of Railways, Indian Railways
- Line: Western Line
- Platforms: 4
- Tracks: 4
- Connections: Line 3 at Grant Road

Construction
- Structure type: Standard on-ground station

Other information
- Status: Active
- Station code: GTR
- Fare zone: Western Railways

Services
Preceding station	Mumbai Suburban Railway	Following station
Charni Road towards Churchgate	Western line	Mumbai Central towards Dahanu Road
Route map
Location
- Location within Mumbai

Grant Road (/graːnt/; station code: GTR), formerly known as Bombay Terminus, is a railway station in South Mumbai, Maharashtra, and is the former terminus of the erstwhile Bombay Baroda and Central India Railway. It was named after Sir Robert Grant, the Governor of Bombay between 1835 and 1839. The terminus was established in 1859 to connect to Surat, over the years the terminus facilities were moved to Bombay Central and facilities at Grant road were converted to cargo operations. Post independence the road which lends its name to the area and the station has been changed to Maulana Shaukatali Road

== History ==
Grant Rd was the first Terminus of the BB&CI railway, when it began services from Bombay. The BB&CI's first train from Bombay to Ahmedabad, which first ran on 28 November 1864, too, terminated at Grant Rd. The train would leave Grant Rd at 7:00 a.m., and would reach Ahmedabad at 5:30 p.m. Reporting about the opening ceremony of the line, The Times of India in its coverage of the event, described the station descriptively, stating that the station, "had already put the Boree Bunder [sic] in the shade, its accommodations being in every respect better and much more extensive than the latter." The booking office for the First and Second class passengers was at the Bellasis Rd end, and that of the Third class passengers at the Falkland Rd end. There was a platform stretching the entire distance between the roads, and was nearly as wide as that of GIPR's Bori Bunder terminus. On 1 November 1865, a Suburban service was started between Grant Rd and Bassein Rd (today's Vasai Road railway station). Around the same time, Vehar (Vihar) water pipes were provided at the station. It was also a station on the first regular suburban service (started on 12 April 1867), though by then, the terminus had been changed to the new Bombay Backbay Station.

The station, in later times, became a goods shed, and carriages and wagons were also stabled there. In August 1928, the track circuiting of the line from Churchgate to Grant Rd was completed on alternating current.

Post-Independence, in December 1969, a new building was constructed at the Grant Rd station, at a cost of Rs. 11.75 lakh. At the end of the year, the WR planned to quadruple the tracks ('have four tracks' in railway jargon) between Churchgate and Grant Rd, so as to ease the pressure; land for this was only acquired in 1970. The project was expected to cost around Rs. 6.22 cr, and required the raising of bridges between Charni Rd and Grant Rd, and the provision of wider spans for OHE wires between Churchgate and Marine Lines.

== Overview ==
Towards the west of the Grant Road station is the Nana Chowk (named after Jaganath Shunkerseth) and the residential localities of Gamdevi, Raghav Wadi, Shastri Hall, Talmaki Wadi, Navi Chikhal Wadi, Juni Chikhal Wadi, and Bhaji Gully (the local vegetable market). To the east of Grant Road station is the retail electronic market of Bombay along Lamington Road. Grant Road station also connects to the famous Radha Gopinath Temple [ISKCON] at Chowpatty. Novelty cinema is at the junction of Grant Road with Lamington Road.

Famous places accessible to the West are Gowalia Tank (also known as August Kranti Maidan), Mani Bhavan at Gamdevi, Bhartiya Vidya Bhavan, Bhavan's College, Wilson College, Girgaum Chowpatty and Walkeshwar. Famous places accessible from the East are Gol Deol off Duncan Road, Chor Bazaar on Mutton Street, Hurkisondas Hospital, Prathana Samaj, Badr Baug.

For information on area, see Grant Road.

== Accessibility ==
Bus routes connecting Grant Road Station (West) include bus number A-155 and 104. Bus number A-155 is a ring route via Pedder Road.

Bus routes connecting Grant Road Station (East) include bus number A-102. Bus number A-102 is a ring route via the Vijay Vallabh Chowk or Pydhonie.

Bus routes crossing the Grant Road station on the Frere Bridge include A-104, A-105, A-135, 121, A-126, 122, A-42 and A-85.

== Gallery ==
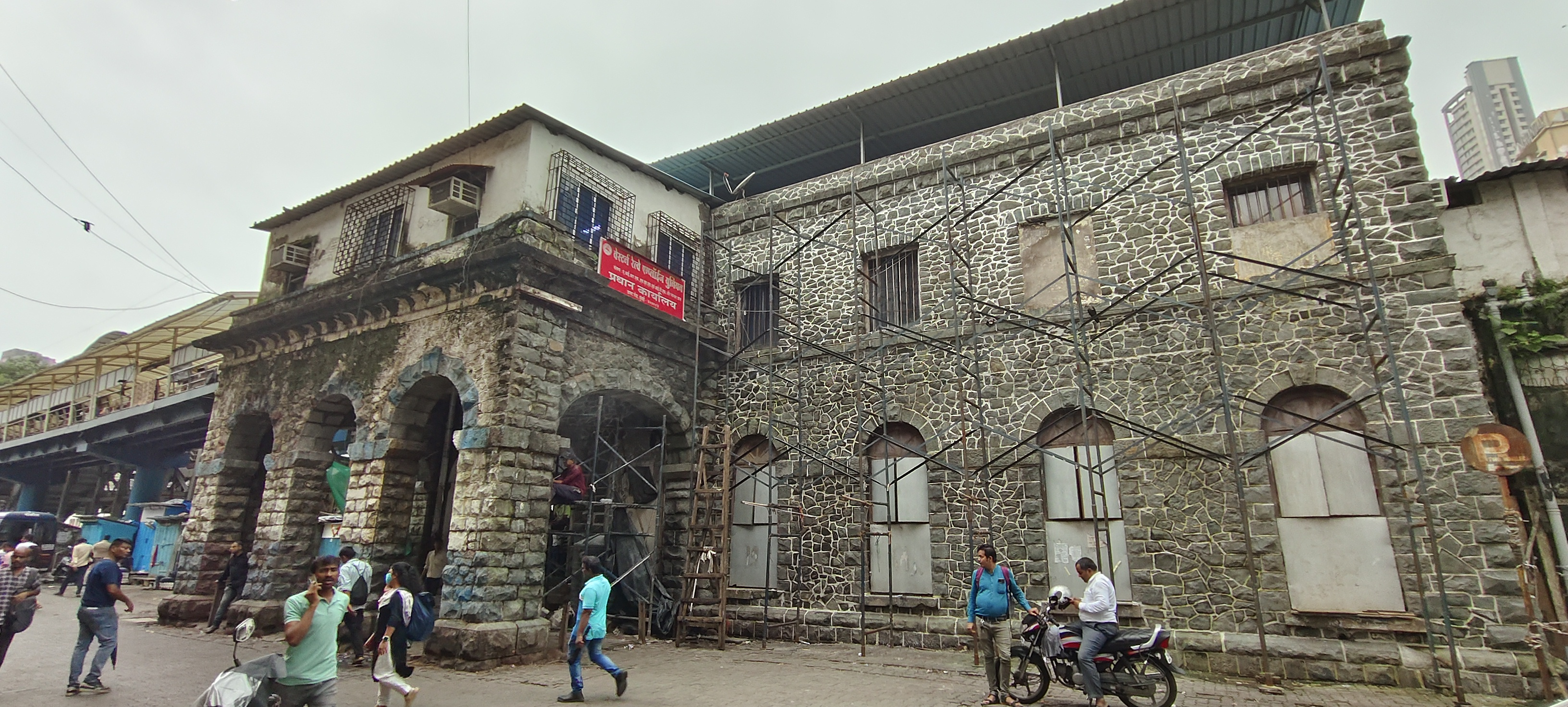
The Stone Building of Grant Rd. Station

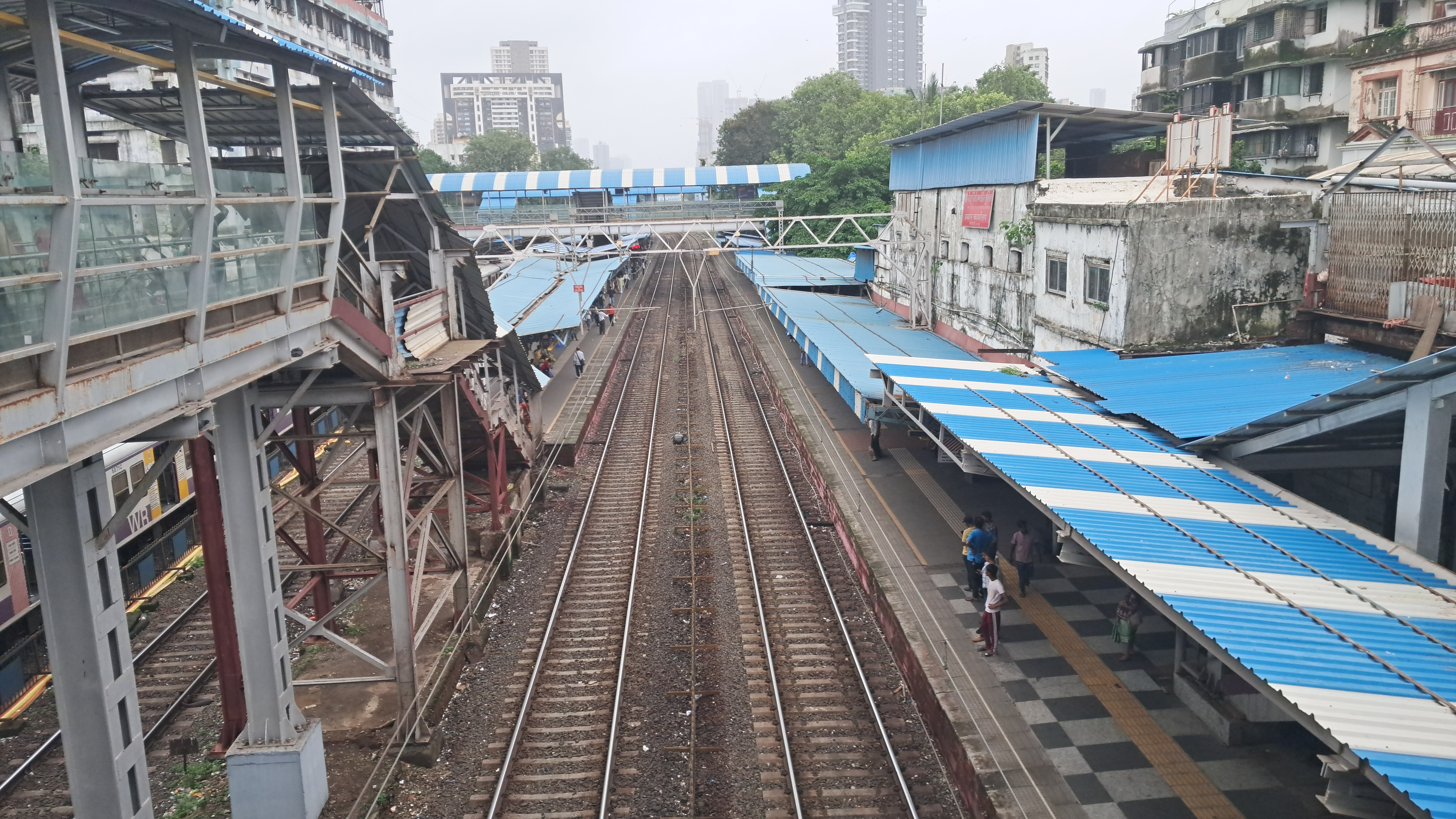
Grant Rd. Station- view from FoB

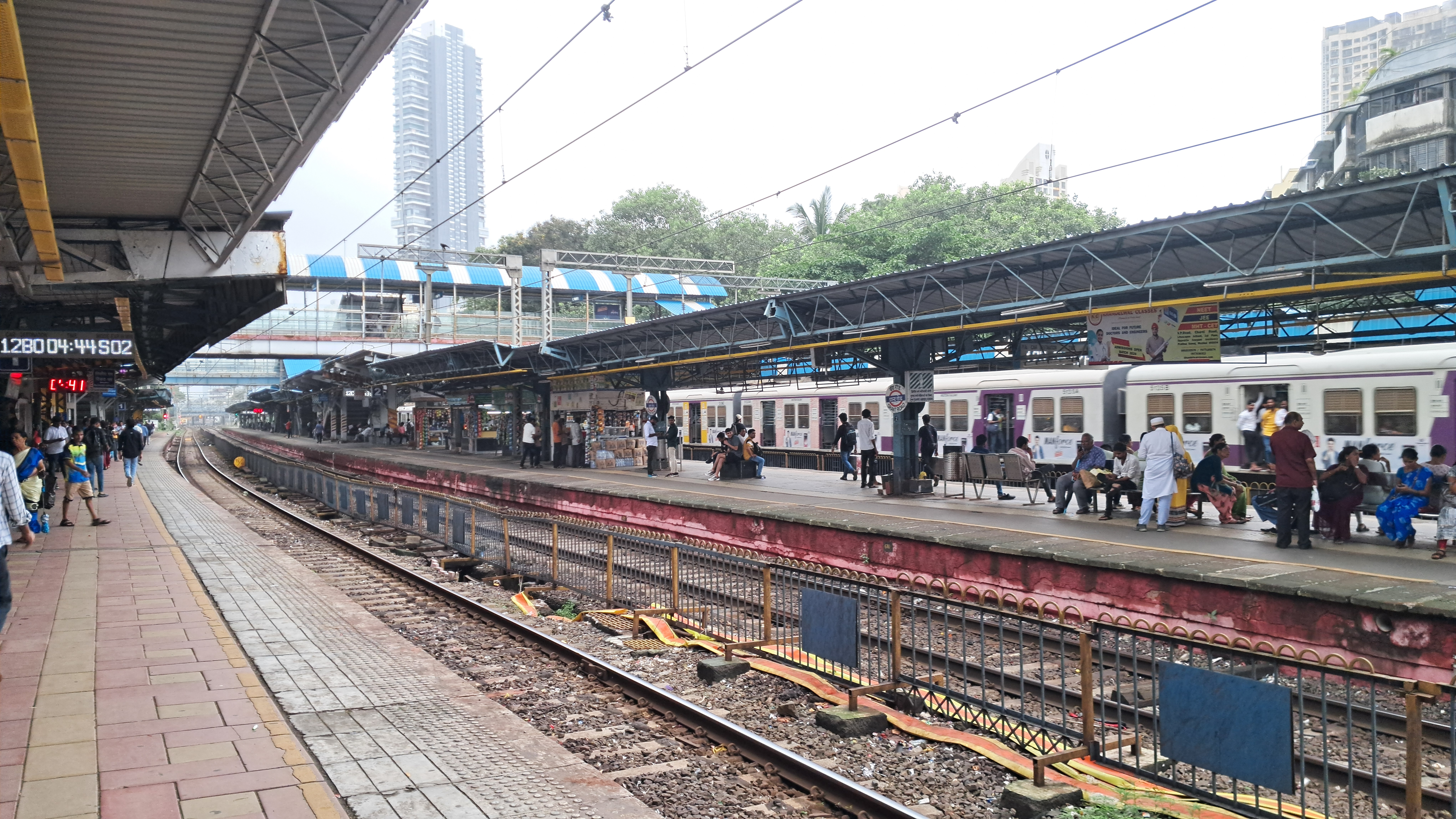
Grant Rd. Station- Platform view

== See also ==
- Gowalia Tank
- Nana Chowk
- Kamathipura
