= Back Bay (Mumbai) =

- Backbay
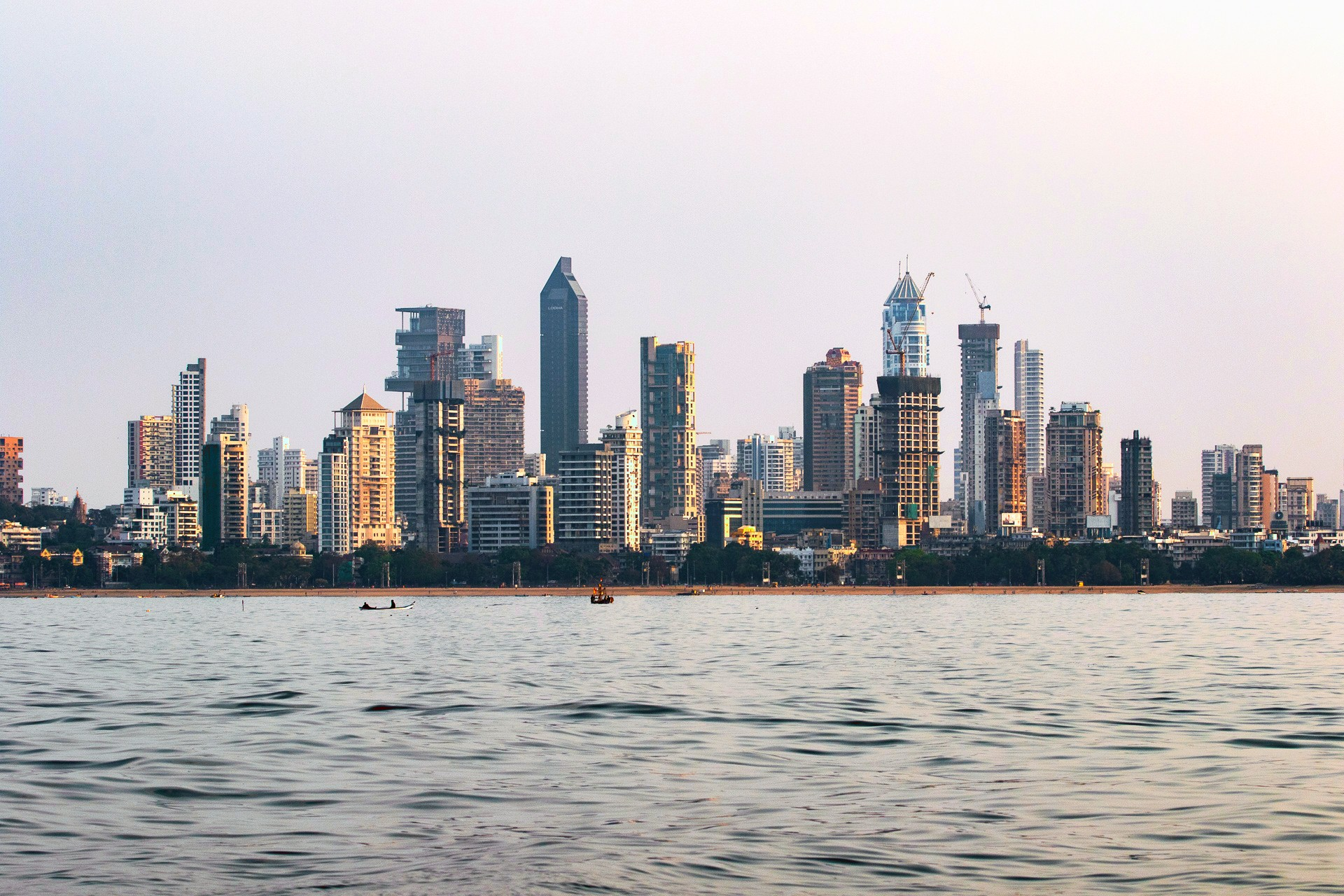
- Mumbai's skyline from the Back Bay, c. 2022

- Location of Back Bay in Mumbai
- Location: south of Mumbai, India
- Coordinates: 18.94°N 72.81°E
- Type: bay
- Ocean/sea sources: Arabian Sea
- Shore length^{1}: 4 km (2.5 mi)
- Settlements: Mumbai, India
- ^{1} Shore length is not a well-defined measure.

Back Bay is a waterbody off the coast of Mumbai city, located to its (south) west, and joins the Arabian Sea.

The shore of Back Bay includes the famed Chowpatty Beach of Mumbai. Other landmarks are the office district of Nariman Point, which is an extension of the Back Bay Reclamation; Marine Drive, which is a promenade road along much of the foreshore that is colloquially called The Queen's Necklace, and has been renamed as the Netaji Subhashchandra Bose Road; the Oberoi Hotel; the Air India headquarters building; the Marine Plaza Hotel; the Taraporewala Aquarium; Wilson College, and the Malabar Hill promontory; to the north-west of the bay, and which includes the wooded Governor's House or Raj Bhavan compound.

== Back Bay reclamation ==
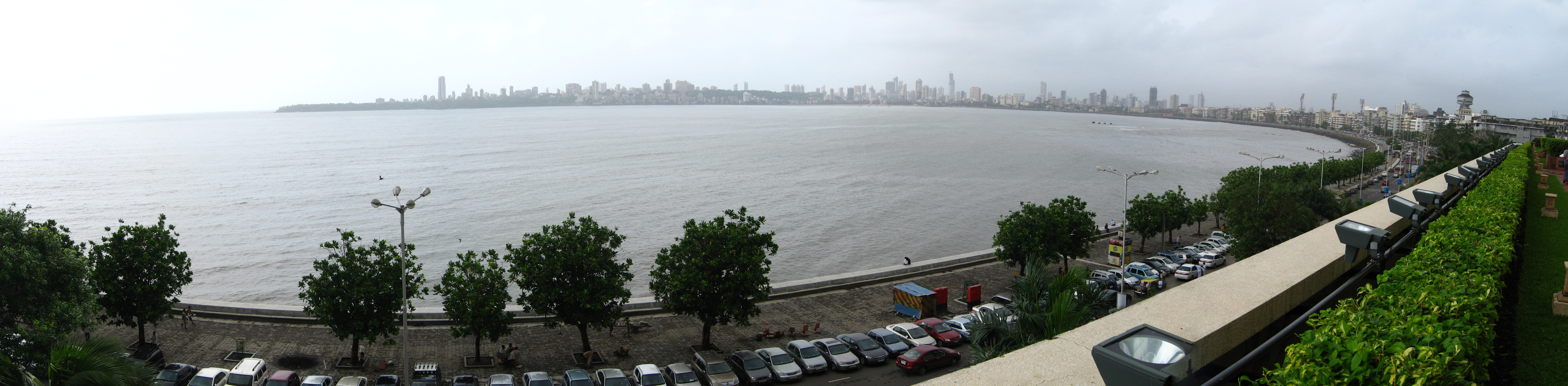
Back Bay viewed from the south east

Reclamation of Back Bay first began in the 1860s to provide land for railway line construction and urban development. However, the reclamation company collapsed after the stock market crash of 1865, and the reclaimed strip was transferred to the Bombay, Baroda and Central India Railway for its Churchgate–Colaba line.

A renewed scheme undertaken in 1920 suffered delays, cost overruns and financial irregularities, becoming known as "Lloyd's Folly" after Governor Sir George Lloyd. By 1929, four blocks covering 439.6 acres had been reclaimed. The northern blocks subsequently developed into the Art Deco precinct between Oval Maidan and Marine Drive.

The scheme was revived in 1958 to reclaim Blocks III–VI. By 1970, approximately 91 hectares of the proposed 222 hectares had been reclaimed. Following public criticism, the state government froze further reclamation on 1 December 1978. In 1983, the Mumbai Metropolitan Region Development Authority was appointed the area's special planning authority; its development plan was subsequently approved in two parts in 2000 and 2001.

== See also ==
- Bombay Backbay railway station
- Mahim Bay
