= Bombay Backbay railway station =

Defunct railway station in Maharashtra, India

Bombay Backbay Station

General information
- Owner: Bombay, Baroda and Central India Railway
- Line: Western Line

Construction
- Structure type: Standard on-ground station

History
- Opened: 1866

Services
No service demolished
Location

Bombay Backbay railway station was a railway station of the erstwhile BB&CI Railway (today's Western Railway), located in Bombay Backbay in Mumbai. It was the starting point of the first regular local train service of the BB&CI Railway. It started on 12 April 1867, between the Station and Viraur (Virar).

== History ==
In the 1860s, after the BB&CIR line entered Bombay from Gujarat, Grant Rd became the first terminus of the line. Service started on 28 November 1864 between Grant Rd and Ahmadabad. The next major milestone was the beginning of local service between Grant Rd, and Bassein Road (Vasai Rd) on 1 November 1865. There were reportedly 2 coached trains, running between Bassein Rd and Grant Rd.

At about the same time, the Bombay Backbay Reclamation Scheme was in progress to 'reclaim the Backbay'. This was a necessary step, partly as a requirement to extend the line from Grant Rd southward along the proposed extension route. A station opened here, in 1866, named Bombay Backbay. Soon after, three suburban trains started at this station. The station primarily functioned as a place to run ballast trains that carried the materials for the land reclamation.

On 12 April 1867, a regular suburban service finally, consisting of four coaches in each direction. The train had First, Second, and Third class compartments, with an exclusive coach for women in second class, and a separate smoking room. The stations on this route were- Backbay, Grant Rd, Dadur, Mahim, Bandora (Bandra), Santacruz, Andaru (Andheri), Pahadee (most likely Goregaon), Berewla (Borivali), Panjoo (at Panju Island), Bassein Rd (Vasai Rd), Nial (Nallasopara) and Viraur (Virar).

The line was later extended further south to a place along the road to the erstwhile Church gate of the Fort in Bombay. The new terminal station was named the Churchgate Station.

The station was probably demolished soon after. Its location was probably somewhere between today's Churchgate station and Marine Lines.
