= Charni Road =

- Neighbourhood
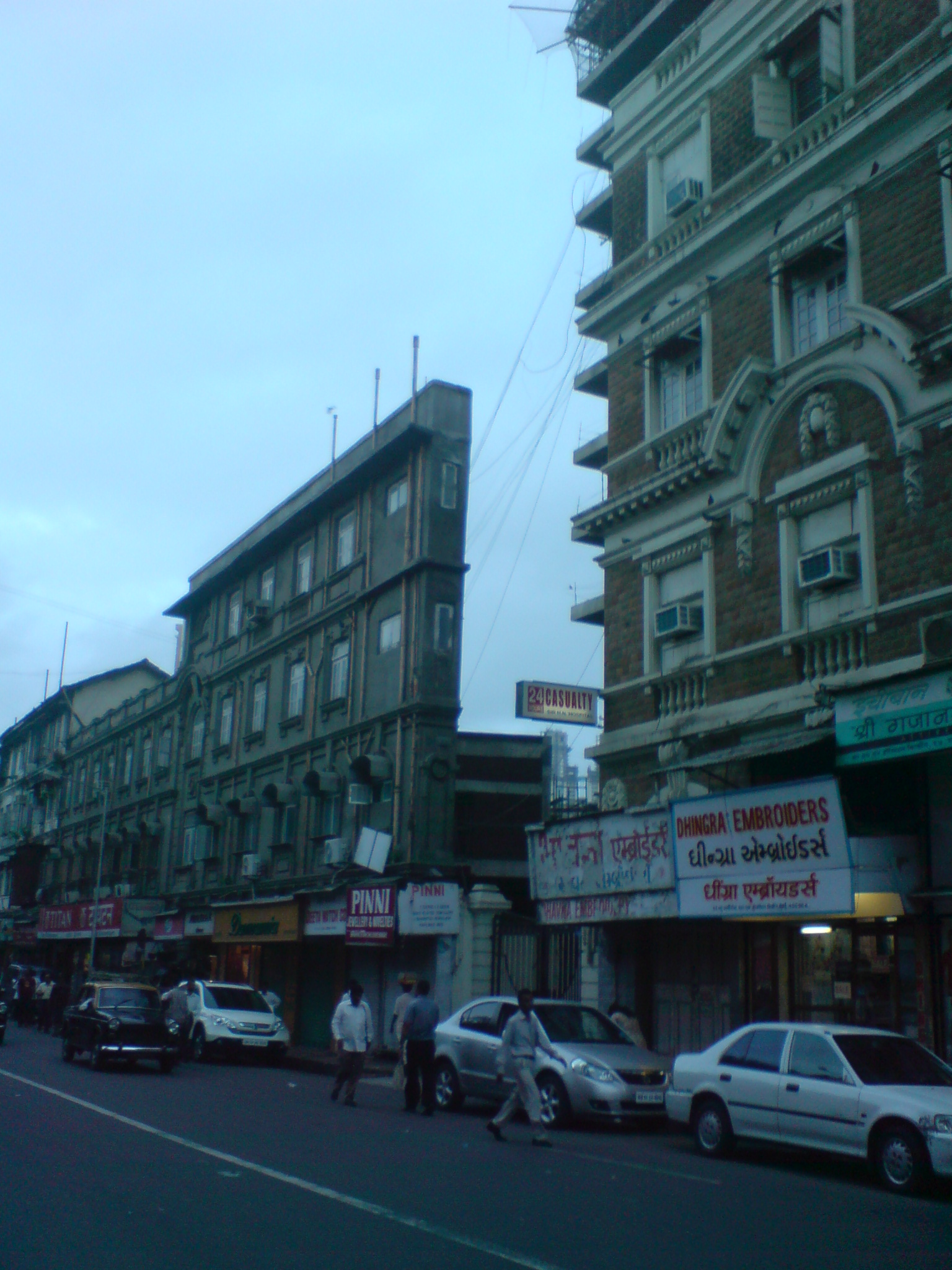
- Hurkisondas Hospital
- Country: India
- State: Maharashtra
- District: Mumbai City
- City: Mumbai

Government
  - Type: Municipal Corporation
  - Body: Brihanmumbai Municipal Corporation (MCGM)

Languages
  - Official: Marathi
- Time zone: UTC+5:30 (IST)
- PIN: 400004
- Area code: 022
- Civic agency: BMC

Charni Road (Marathi pronunciation: [t͡ʃəɾniː ɾoːɖ]) is a neighbourhood in South Mumbai, Maharashtra. It is served by Charni Road railway station.

== History ==
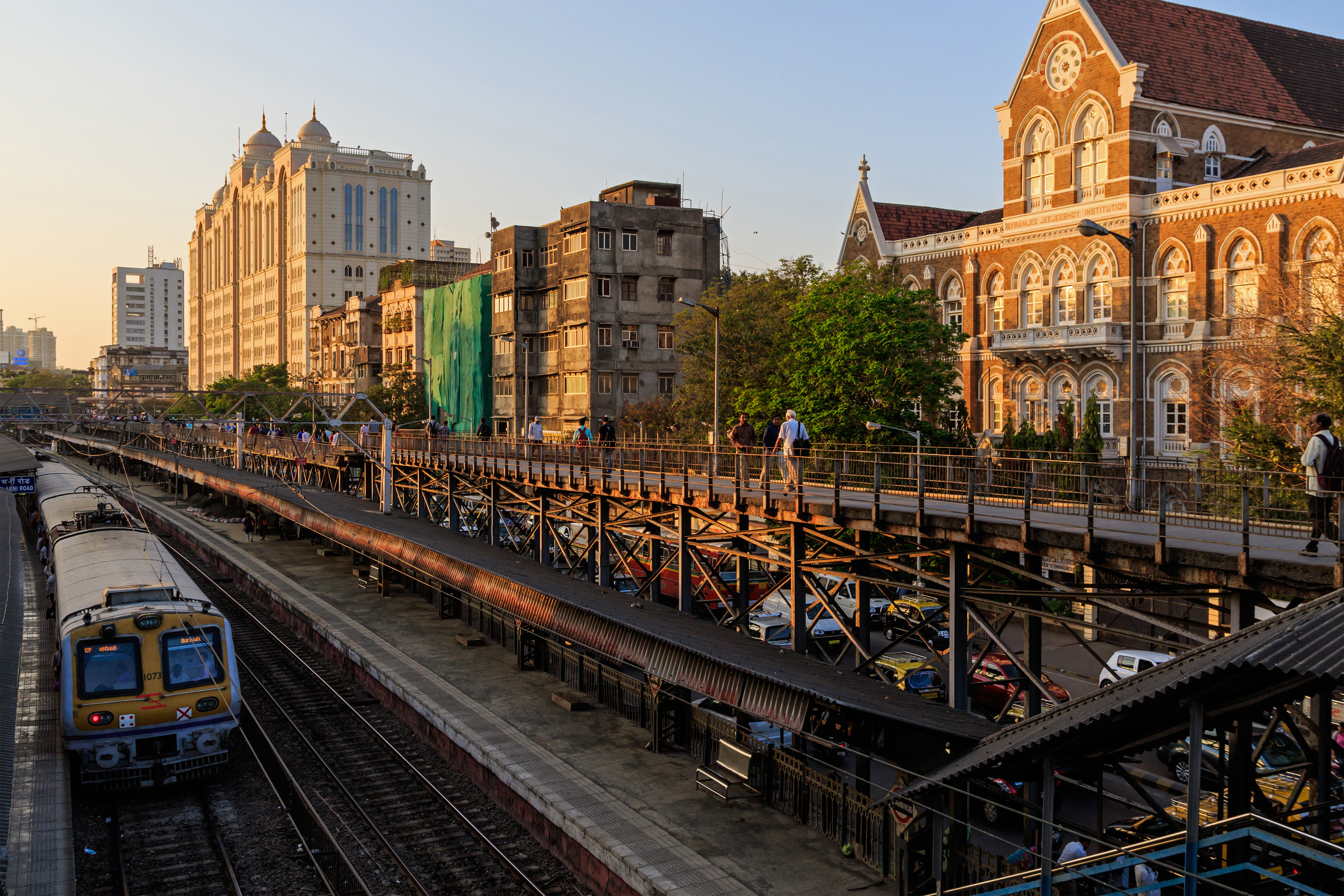
Charni Road station, 2016

It is believed that when the British Government raised a grazing tax on people bringing their cattle to graze on the grass at the Azad Maidan, Jamshedjee Jeejeebhoy purchased the grasslands near Thakurdwar out of his funds and opened those grounds to the locals to graze their cattle for free. As the Marathi word for grazing is "charne", the area came to be known as Charni ... and thence, the road beside it, as the Charni Road. According to another source, the word is a corruption of "Chendni", a locality in the Thane-Koliwada area. Many people originally from Chendni migrated to South Mumbai to the area which is known today as Charni Road.

In 1884, Sir Adamji Peerbhoy (1845–1913), a well-known philanthropist from Mumbai, India, built several properties (a Bohra kabrastan (cemetery/burial ground), Masjid, Sanatorium, and Amanbai Charitable Hospital later known as Saifee Hospital on Charni Road opposite the railway station. He wanted to provide a safe haven for the travellers, poor, or needy to rest, use the masjid for prayers, or the hospital if they needed it. After Sir Adamjee Peerbhoy's death, his grandson Akbar, against the wishes of the family, converted the properties into a trust. The family resisted the change, but Akbar had a lot of influence.

He was the son of Abdul Hussein Peerbhoy (who was the second out of seven children of Sir Adamjee Peerbhoy, who had engineered and built the Matheran Hill Railway. The property was out of the hands of the Peerbhoy family and into the hands of the trustees. The trustees were later on changed by the Syedna (leader of the Dawoodi Bohras) and the new trustees handed over the property to the Syedna. The property was built for the benefit of the poor and the needy. The property still exists on Charni Road and is still under the name of Sir Adamji Peerbhoy.
