= Churchgate railway station =

Railway station in Maharashtra, India

Churchgate चर्चगेट
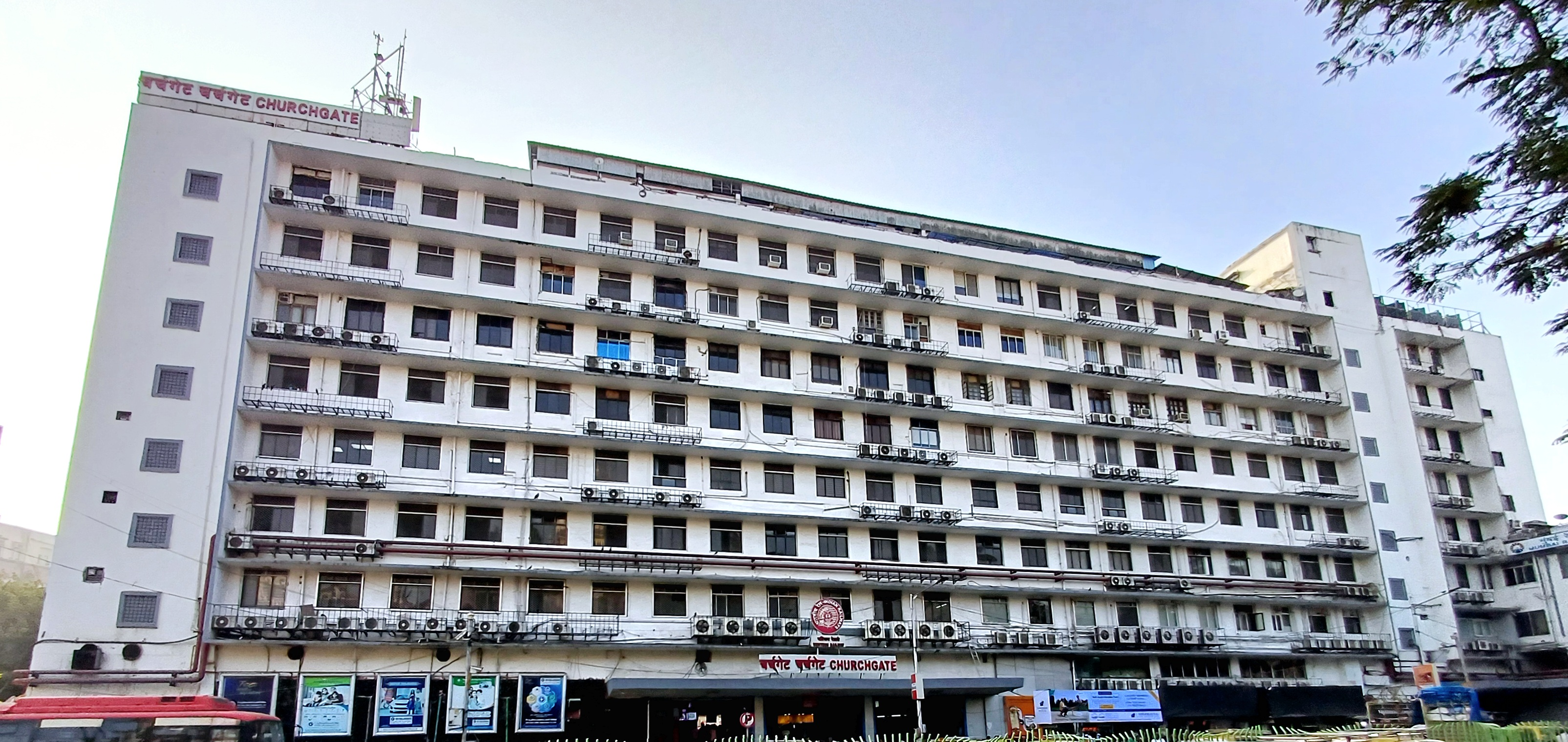
- Churchgate railway station in 2024

General information
- Location: Churchgate
- Coordinates: 18°56′5.59″N 72°49′37.79″E
- System: Mumbai Suburban Railway
- Owner: Indian Railways
- Operator: Western Railway
- Line: Western
- Platforms: 4 (1-2 for slow line & 3-4 for fast line)
- Tracks: 4
- Train operators: Western Railway
- Bus operators: BEST
- Connections: Line 3 Churchgate

Construction
- Structure type: At-grade

Other information
- Status: Active
- Station code: CH (suburban); CCG (mainline)
- Zone(s): Western Railway zone
- Division(s): Mumbai WR

History
- Opened: 10 January 1870
- Rebuilt: 1876, 1931, 1957
- Electrified: 5 January 1928 (1500 V DC); 5 February 2012 (25 kV 50 Hz AC)

Passengers
- 2012-13: 5,05,110

Services
Preceding station	Mumbai Suburban Railway	Following station
Terminus	Western line	Marine Lines towards Dahanu Road
Out-of-system interchange
Preceding station	Mumbai Metro	Following station
Vidhan Bhavan towards Cuffe Parade	Line 3 transfer at Churchgate	Hutatma Chowk towards Aarey JVLR
Route map
Location
- Location within Mumbai

Churchgate (station code: CCG) is the southern terminus on the Western Line of the Mumbai Suburban Railway. It is located in Churchgate, in South Mumbai, Maharashtra. It is near Chhatrapati Shivaji Maharaj Terminus.

== History ==
=== Early history ===
Churchgate in the 1930s

The Fort area was initially an actual fort enclosure, the fort named the English Fort of Bombay. It had three main gates. One of these gates led straight to Saint Thomas Cathedral Church, hence, it was named "Church Gate". The fortress was eventually demolished in order to create new spaces for the expansion of the city, in 1860s. The Churchgate railway station was built in close proximity to the position of the demolished gate, and hence, got its name.

The Bombay, Baroda, and Central India Railway (present Western Railway) was inaugurated in 1855, with the construction of a rail line (BG) between Ankleshwar and Uttaran (a distance of 29 miles). In 1859, this line was further extended along the west coast up to Bombay. By 1867, a track along the foreshore, further than Grant Road station, was constructed, up to the station named as "Bombay Backbay" (near Marine Lines) by 1866. On 12 April 1867, the first suburban train was started, with one train each way from Virar to Bombay Back Bay. The stations were then named: "Viraur, Neela, Bassein Road, Panjo, Berewla, Pahadee, Andaru, Santa Cruz, Bandora, Mahim, Dadur, Grant Road, and Bombay Backbay".

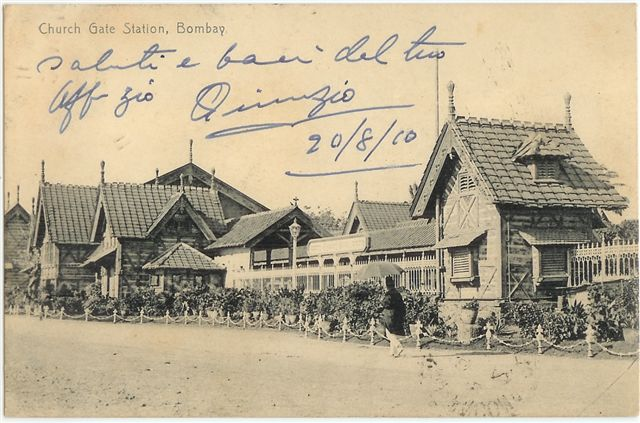
Churchgate station (circa 1910), Mumbai, Maharashtra

Around the start of 1870s, Churchgate was opened. It began with five trains running each day. The line was further extended towards Colaba in 1873, and a goods shed was built there. Churchgate station was situated in the heart of the city, and it is quite certain that the old station was not able to cope with the growing demand. The station was hence rebuilt in 1876 with two platforms. Its structure resembled an English inn and was compared by the Bombay Guardian to a Swiss chalet. The station then had just two platforms. The Up platform catered to passengers arriving from Marine Lines, while the Down platform catered to those travelling towards Marine Lines or further northward. The station also had a level crossing situated to its south. It was used by passengers willing to use the Down Platform, and to prevent pedestrians from crossing the tracks. Around two decades later, the grand BB&CIR headquarters were built just opposite the station, completed by 1899.

In 1920, the Government of Bombay issued order to the BB&CI railway to hand over the section of rail line between Churchgate and Colaba, to allow unrestricted access for the planned Backbay reclamation. In fact, the line extension to Colaba was permitted only on the condition that the extension would be relinquished, should there be further reclamation projects in the vicinity. Amidst this, were the plans for railway electrification. The plans were sanctioned in 1923, and the scheme covered the section between Churchgate and Borivali. For this, the station had to be remodeled extensively. The station was completely renovated in December 1926. A foot-over bridge was provided, and the level crossing practically closed for vehicles and pedestrians. Besides, the covered portion of the station was extended, with an extension of 200 ft south of the bridge, and 100 ft in the north. In August 1928, the section from Churchgate to Grant Rd was track circuited on Alternating Current.

In view of the upcoming reclamation, Bombay Central (Mumbai Central), a new station, was constructed near Bellasis Bridge and was opened on 18 December 1930. From the midnight of 31 December, Colaba station ceased to be a terminus, and the line then terminated at Churchgate from the New Year's Day of 1931. The station had to be again remodeled, and changes included the demolishing of the old level crossing, and the footbridge.

By 1936, the entire portion of the line between Churchgate and Bandra was equipped with 169 colour light signals, 89 operated shunt signals, and 112 power-worked points.

On 28 April 1952, modern rakes were introduced with the new chocolate and cream livery between Churchgate and Borivali. In July 1955, the first pedestrian subway in India was opened, near the Churchgate station. The station underwent its final reconstruction in the mid 1950s, converting the humble station to a seven storied building, offering better amenities like booking offices, sanitation facilities, and above all, bringing all the scattered offices of the railway to a single building. The new (the current) building was finally inaugurated on 3 June 1957.

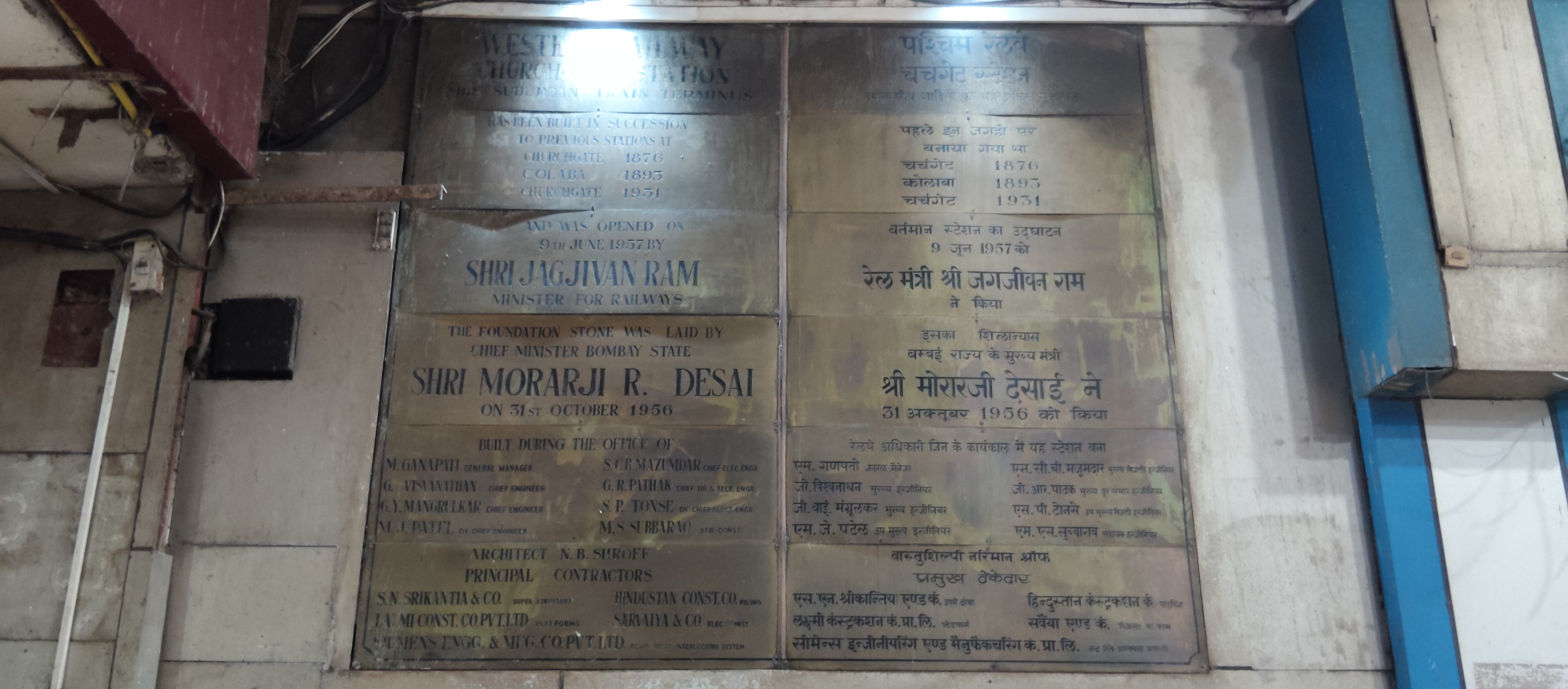
Plaque at Churchgate Subway commemorating the opening of the new station

=== Current history ===
Presently, this station is home to the Western Railway headquarters. The older Western Railway headquarters is across the road. Today, the station is one of the busiest stations in the city. Trains arrive and depart every minute with clockwork precision. Millions of city dwellers residing in the suburbs alight at this station to get to their offices in the business districts of South Mumbai. The total cost of the reconstruction of Churchgate station was approximately INR 12.8 million, which includes the remodelling of the yard, the construction of platforms, station premises, and offices.

The station is the terminus for local trains on Western Railways. The earliest train departs at 4:15 for Virar, and the last train departs at 1:00 towards Borivali.

Till 2010, the station had platforms which could accommodate 9 and 12 coach trains. But with the introduction of 15-coach trains there was a need to extend the length of the platform. Hence, in Dec 2010 work began on extension of the platforms to accommodate the 15-coach trains,

On 28 June 2015, a train derailed after crashing into the end of the platform after not stopping in time. Five people were injured.

In February 2023, at the first national executive meeting the Shiv Sena party, a resolution was passed to rename the station to "Chintamanrao Deshmukh station", after former RBI governor and Union Finance Minister C. D. Deshmukh.

== Gallery ==
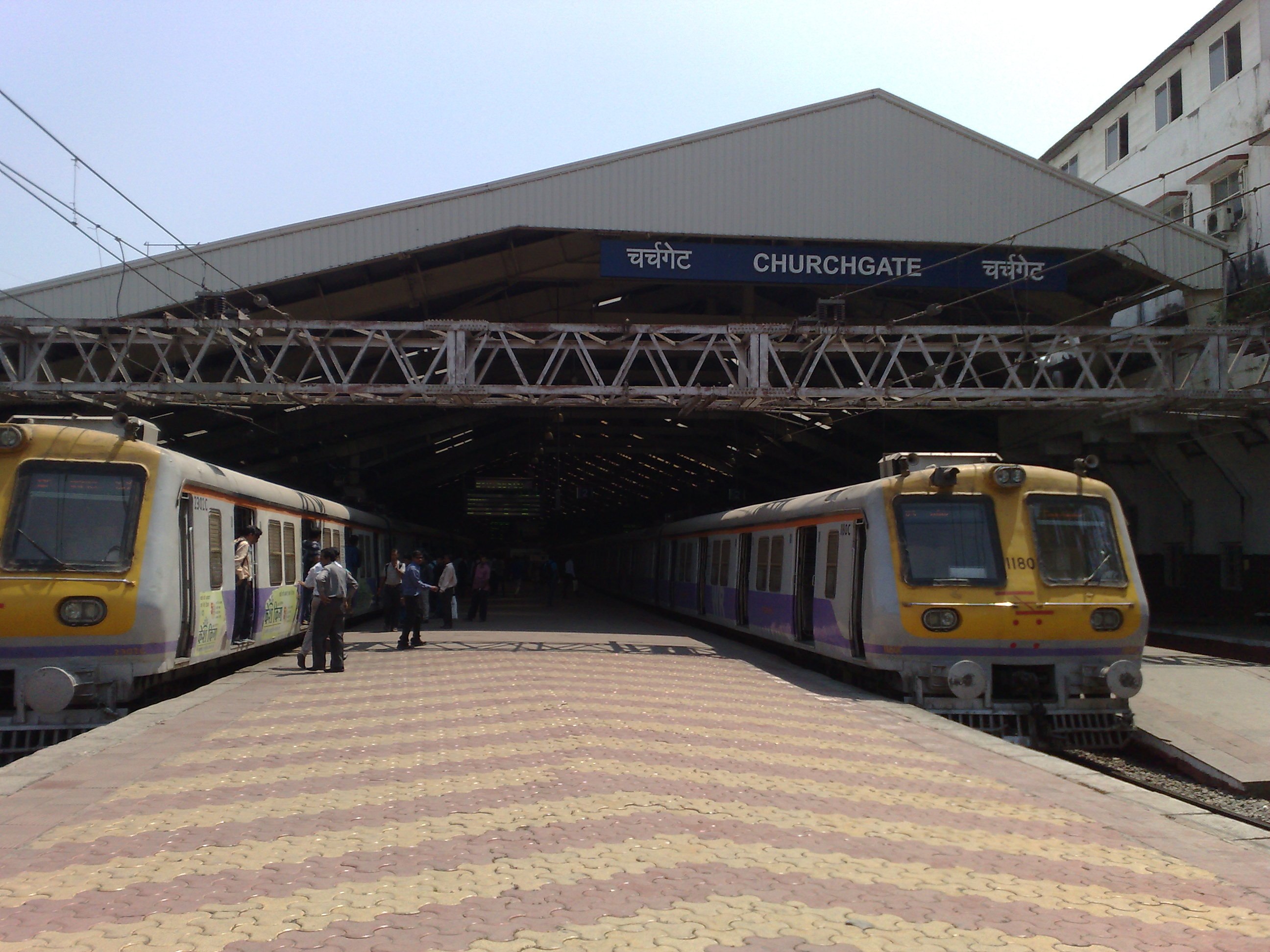
Platforms extend beyond the canopy

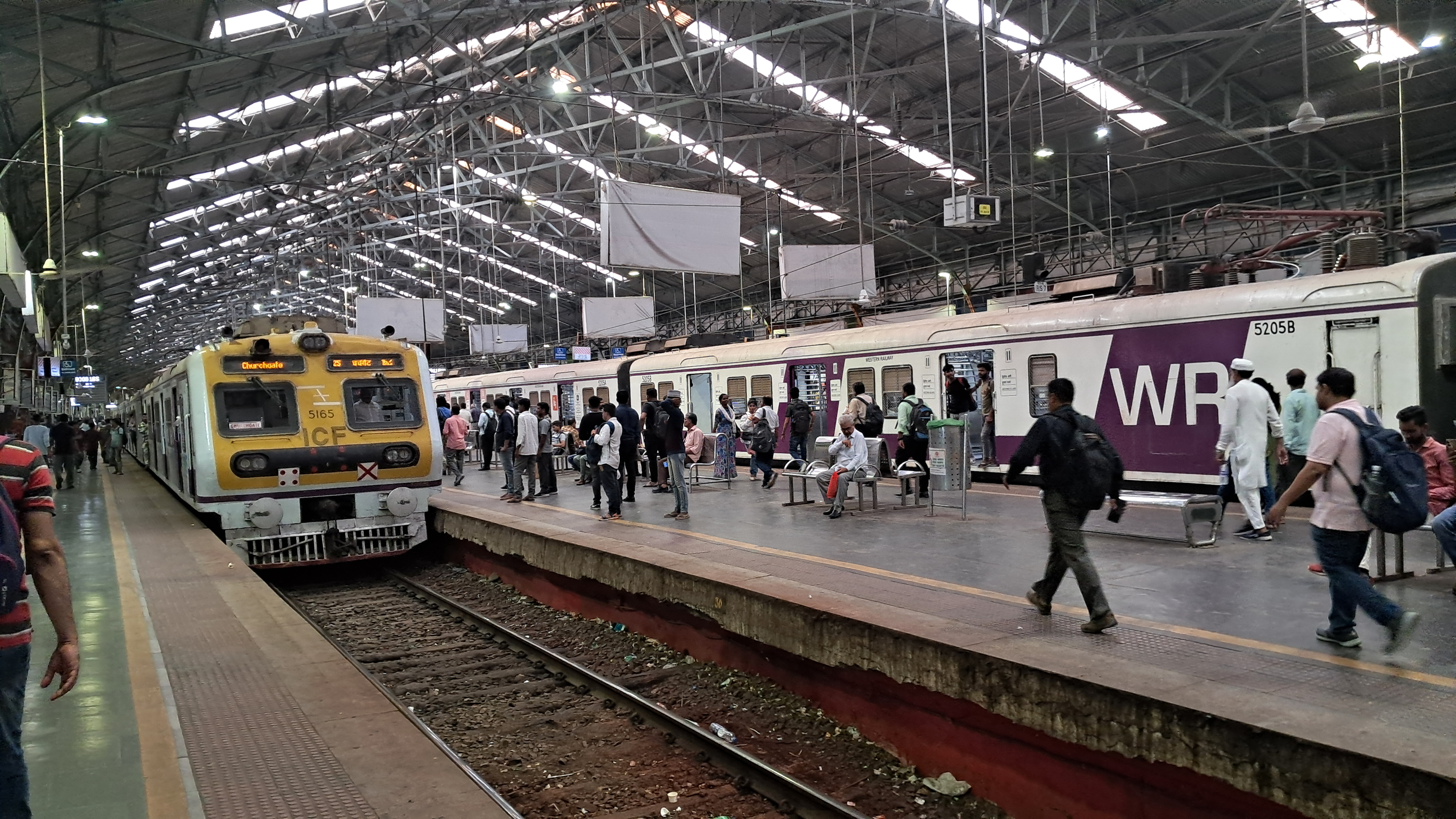
View of a Local Train entering Churchgate Pf.1

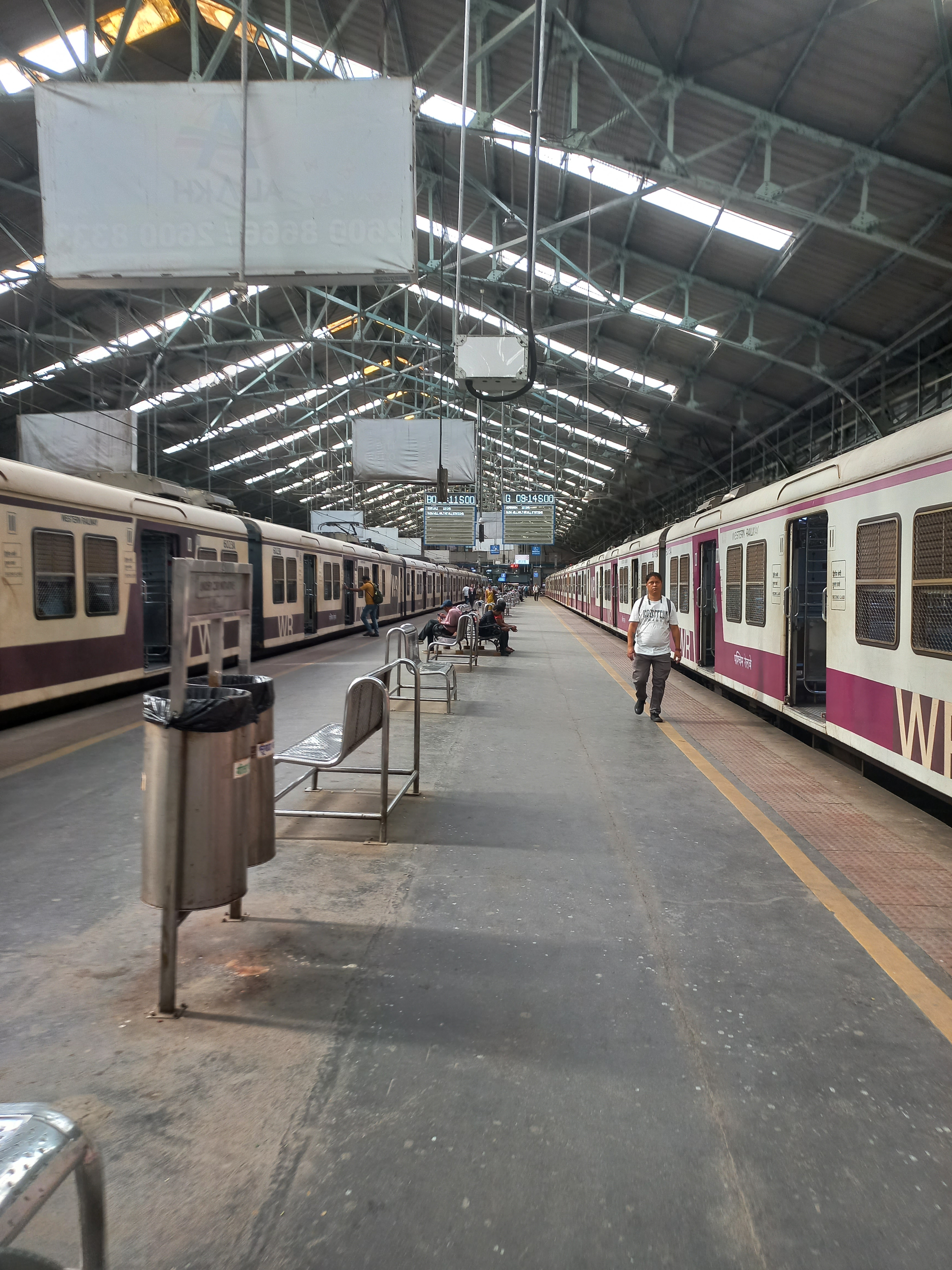
Churchgate station platform 2/3

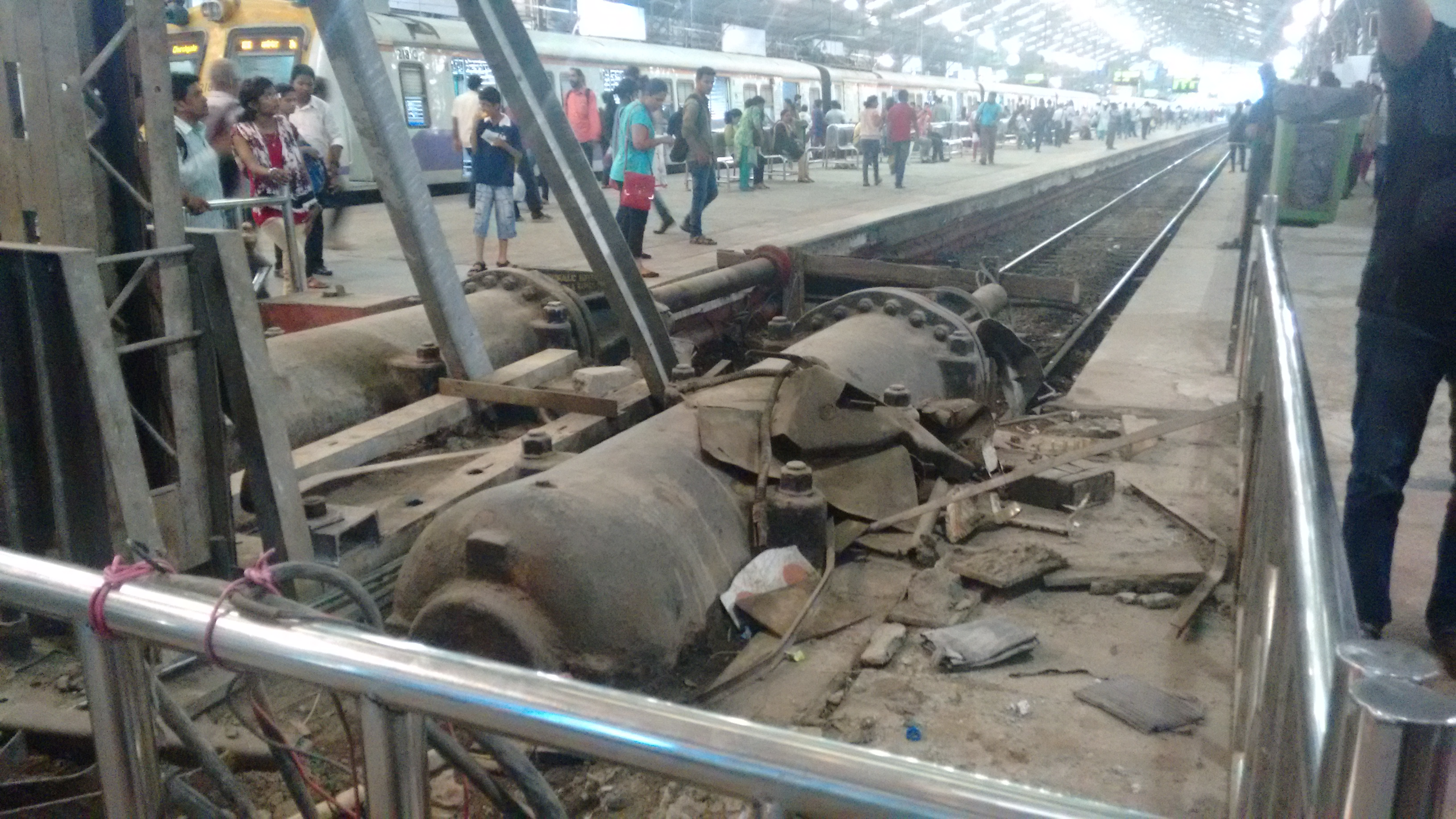
Damaged buffer, post the accident on 28 June 2015.

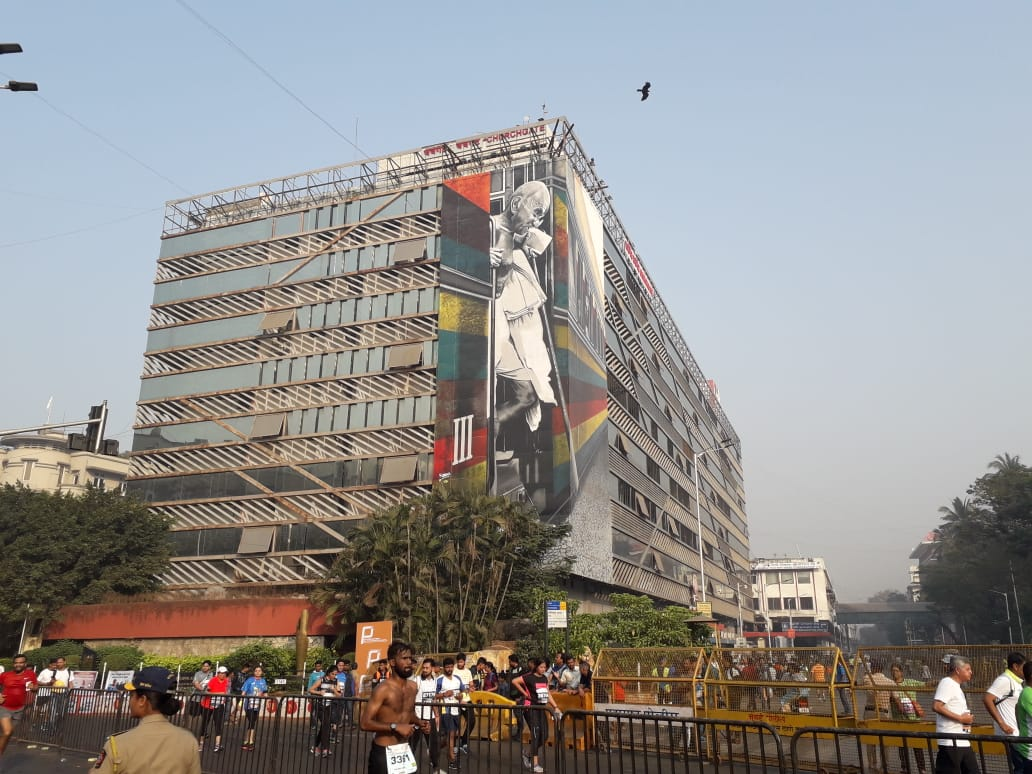
Churchgate station with Mural of Mahatma Gandhi by Brazilian artist Eduardo Kobra

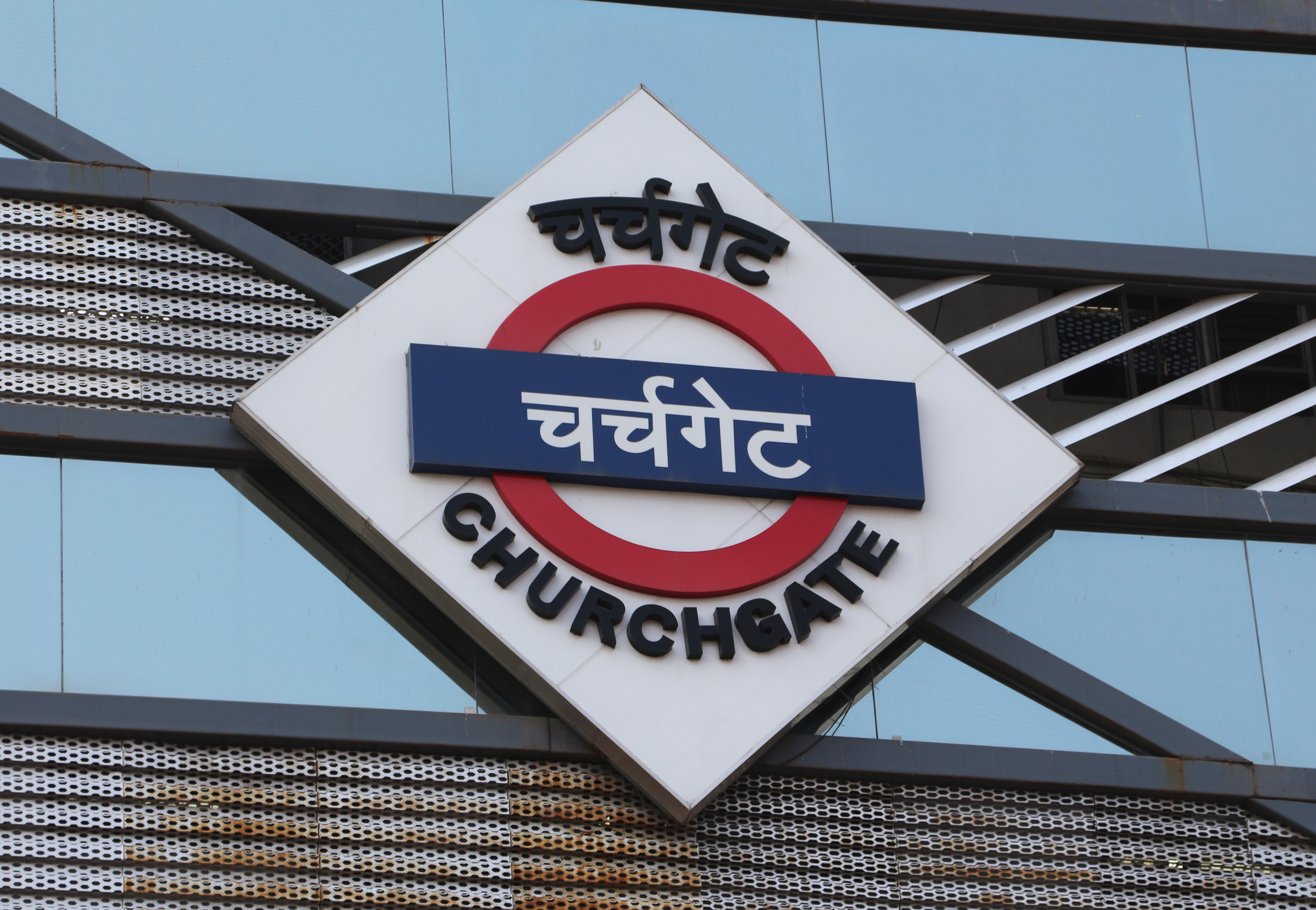
Churchgate Railway Station sign

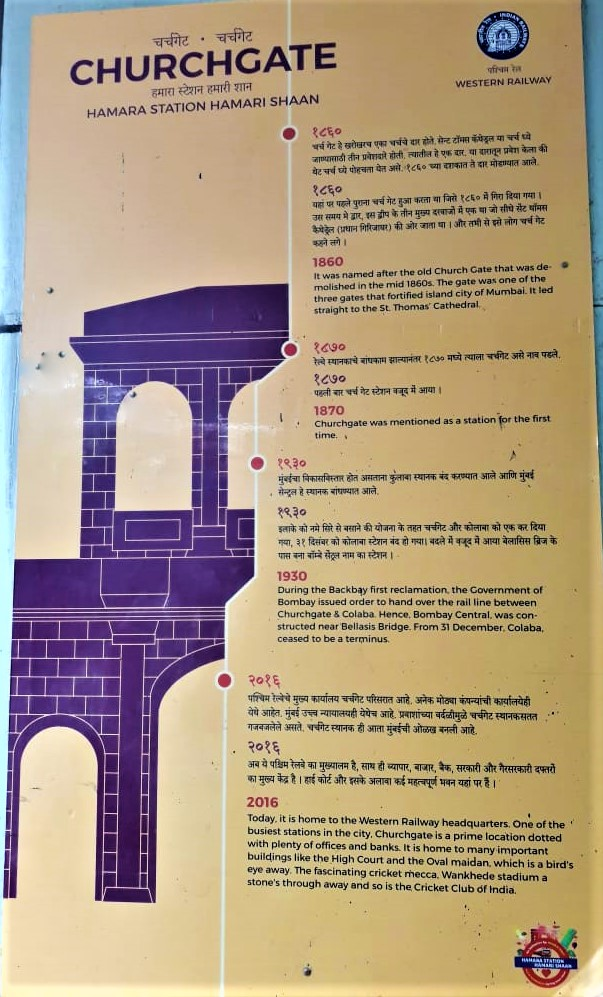
Churchgate station Banner
