= Vile Parle railway station =

Railway Station in Maharashtra, India

Vile Parle

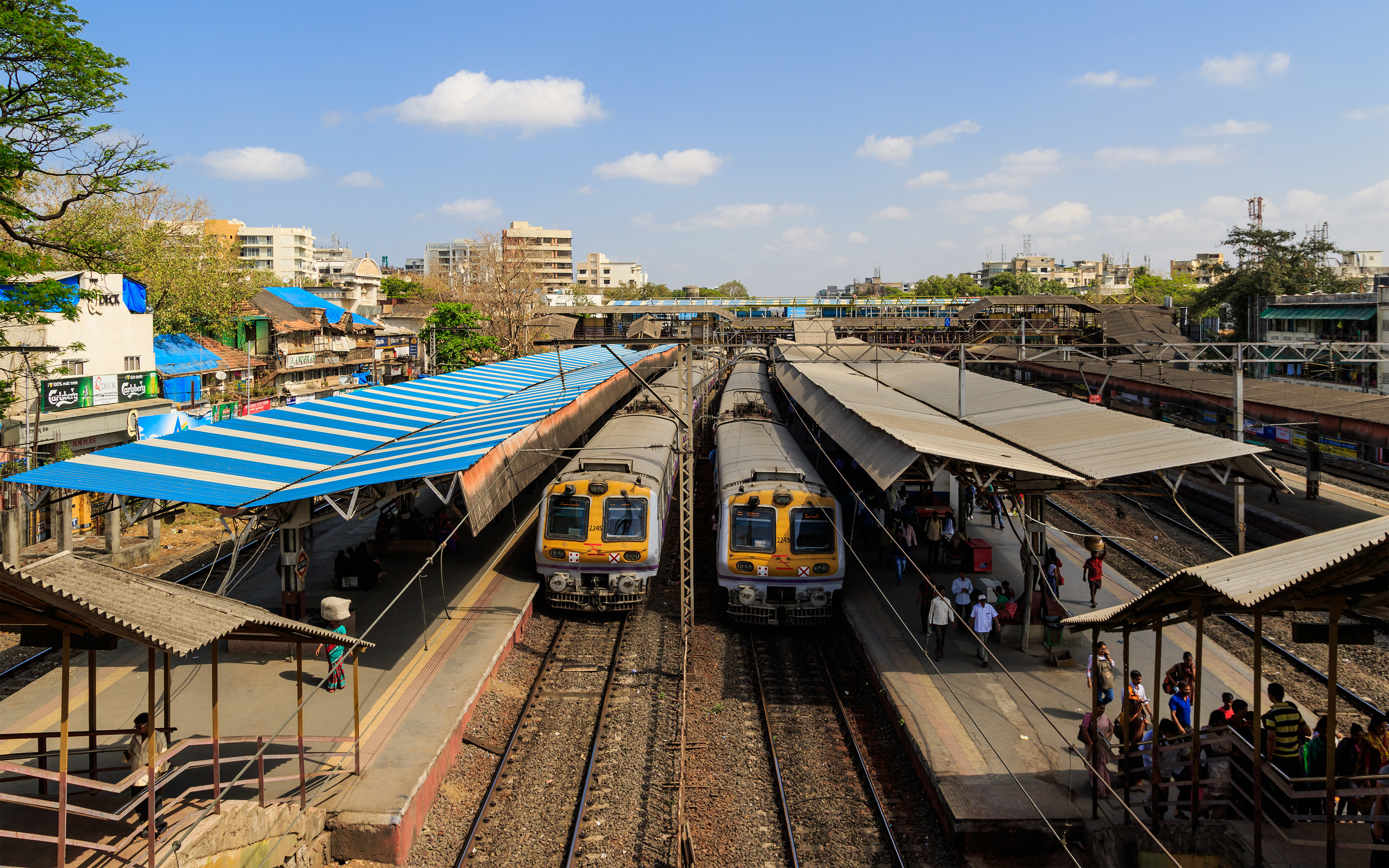

General information
- Coordinates: 19°05′58″N 72°50′38″E
- System: Mumbai Suburban Railway station
- Owner: Ministry of Railways, Indian Railways
- Lines: Western Line, Harbour Line
- Platforms: 6
- Tracks: 7

Construction
- Structure type: Standard on-ground station
- Parking: No
- Cycle facilities: yes

Other information
- Status: Active
- Station code: VLP
- Fare zone: Western Railways

History
- Opened: 1906

Services
Preceding station	Mumbai Suburban Railway	Following station
Santacruz towards Churchgate	Western line	Andheri towards Dahanu Road
Santacruz towards Chhatrapati Shivaji Terminus	Harbour line	Andheri towards Goregaon
Route map
Location
- Location within Mumbai

Vile Parle (station code: VLP) is a railway station on the Western line and Harbour line, of the Mumbai Suburban Railway network. It serves the Vile Parle locality of Mumbai.

In July 2013, Vile Parle became the first station on the Western line, and the second on the Mumbai Suburban Railway (after Thane railway station), to have an escalator. It cost ₹5 million (US$52,000).

== History ==
Vile Parle Station was opened in 1906, at the behest of Seth Goculdas Tejpal, an industrialist who had built a mansion in the village. After Independence, additional platforms were built at Vile Parle, Khar Rd, Santacruz, Andheri, and other works were completed at a cost of ₹ 3.1 million to ease the overcrowding.

== Gallery ==
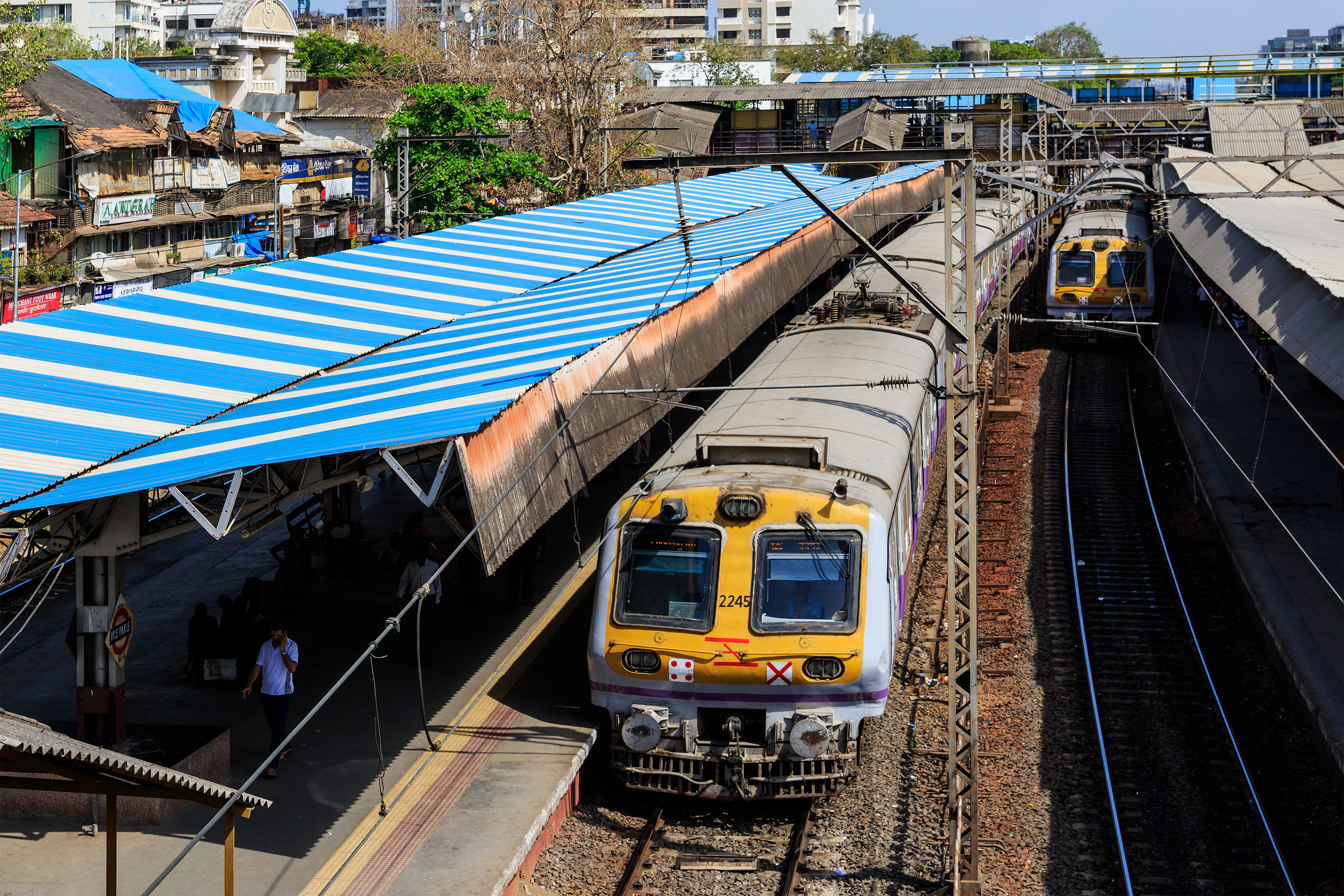
Local train at Vile Parle station

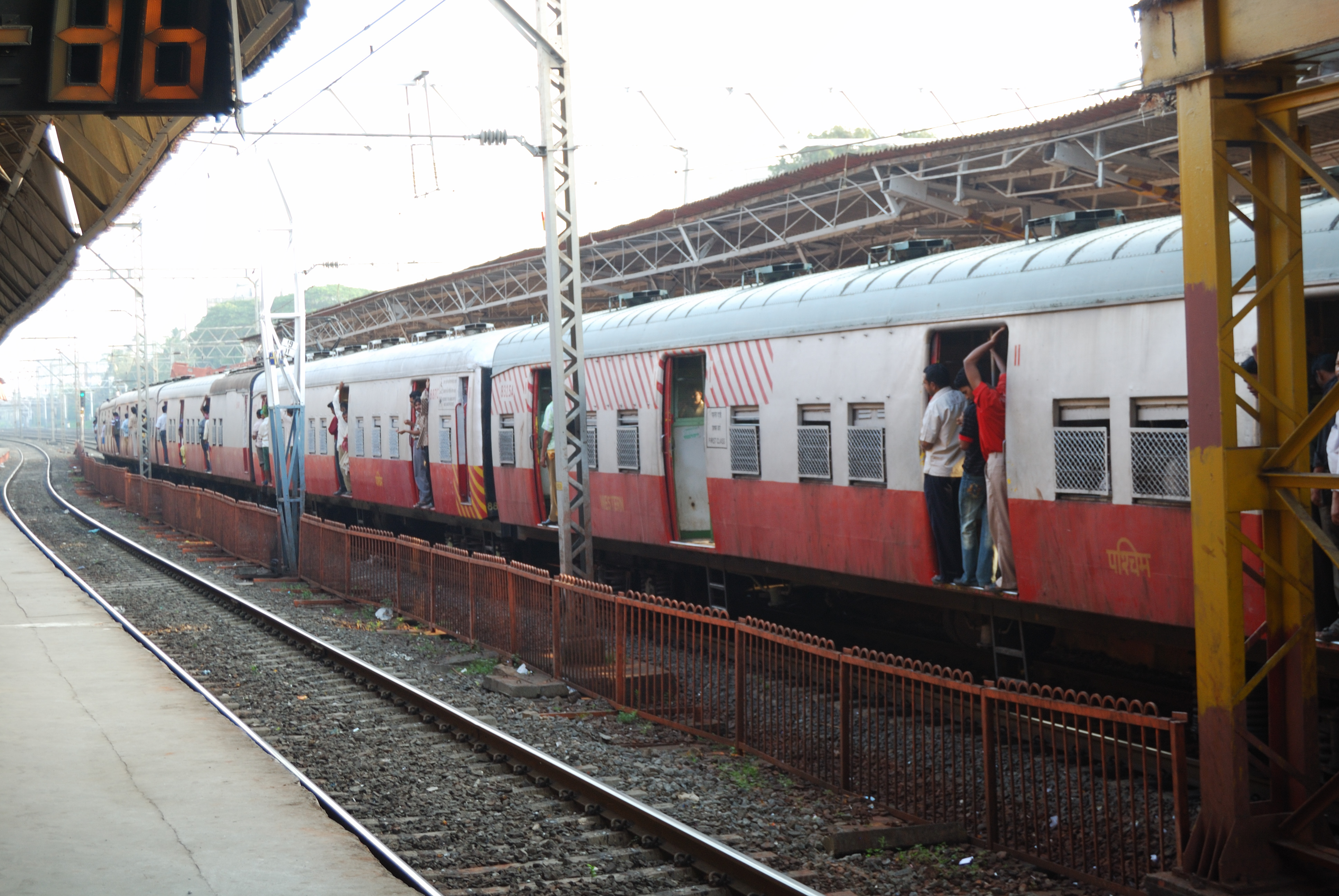
Old Local rake at Vile Parle

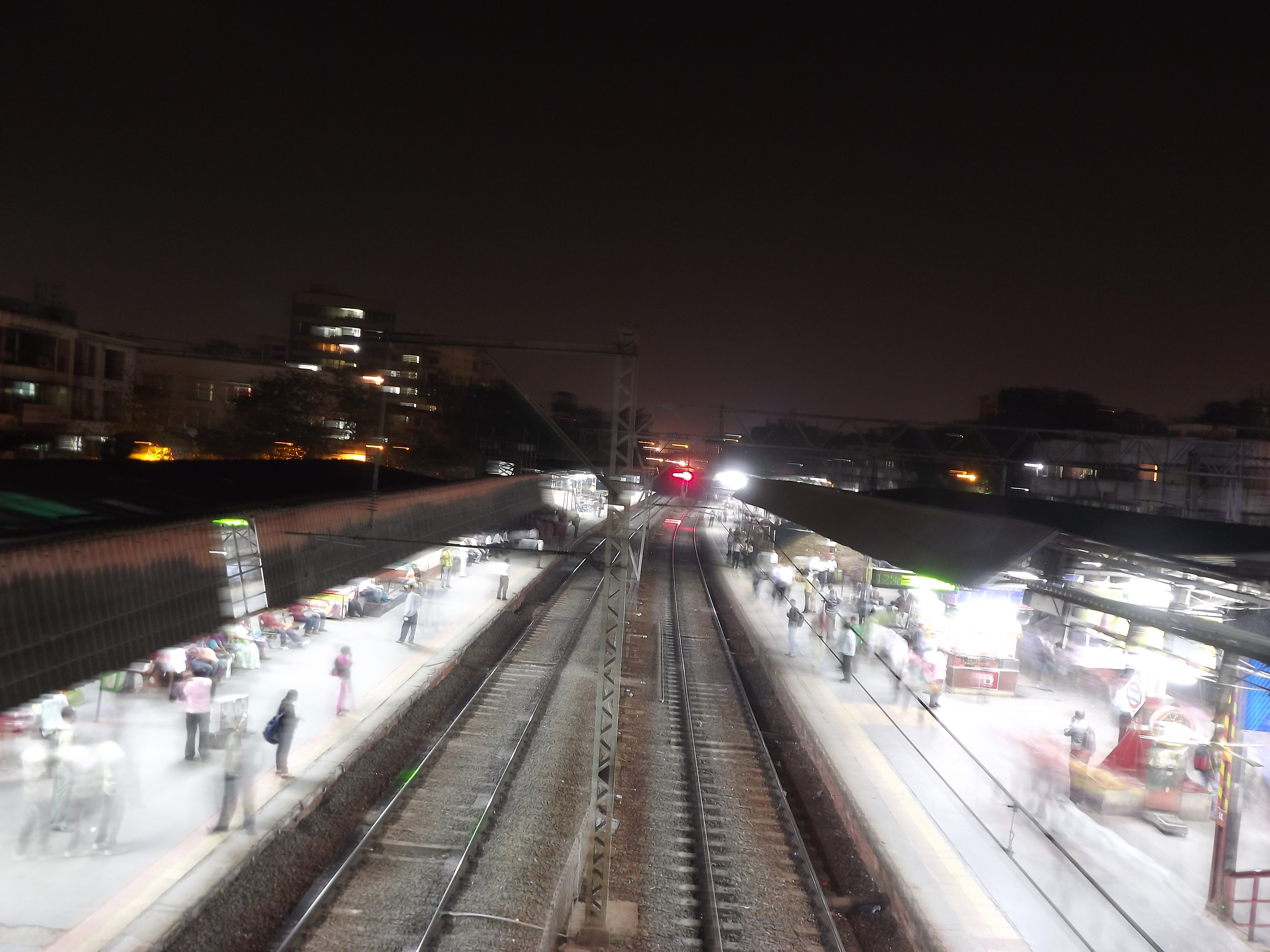
VIle Parle station: View from FoB

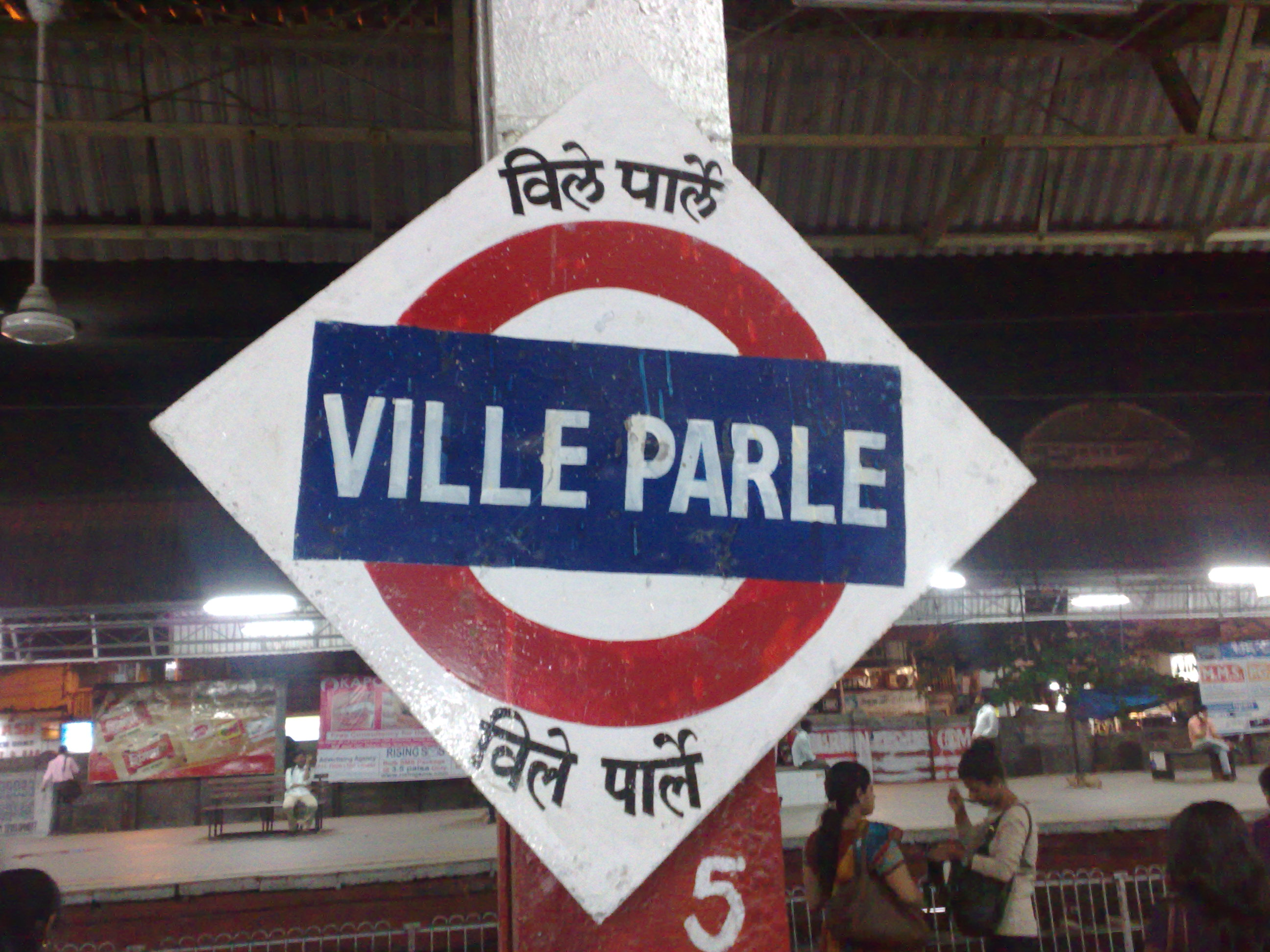
Vile Parle Station board

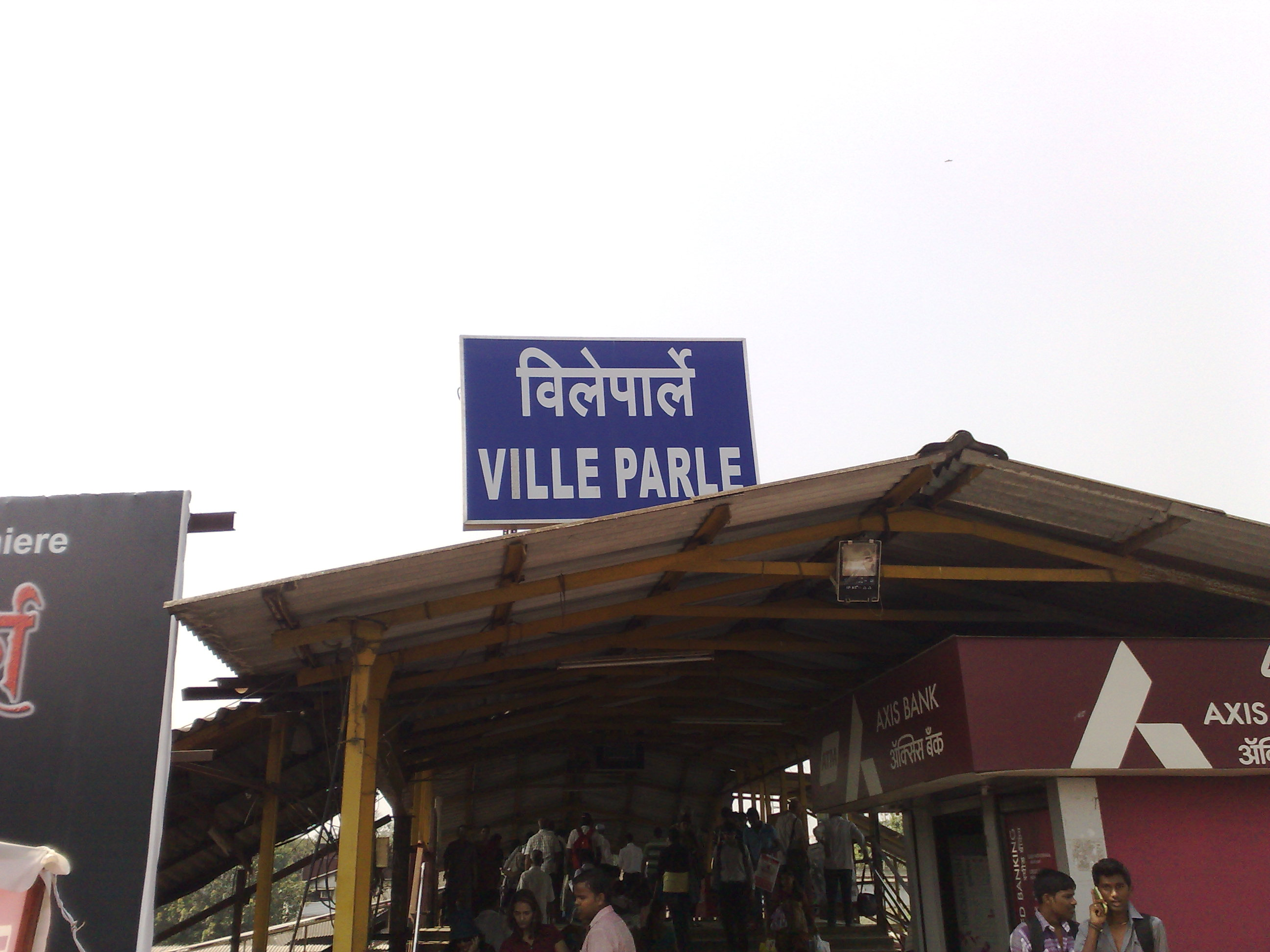
Entry Board from Parle market
