= Andheri railway station =

Railway station in Maharashtra, India

Andheri

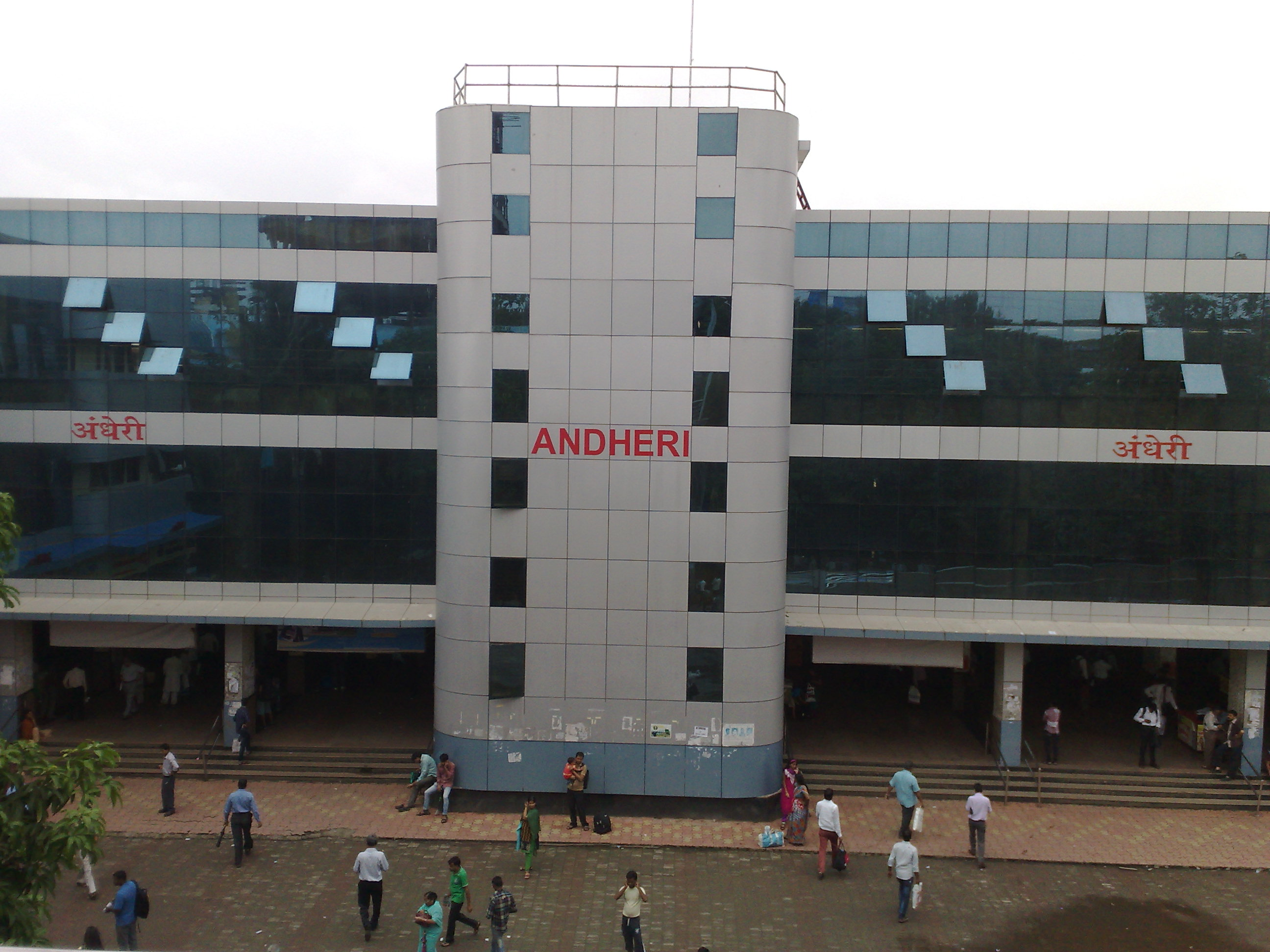
- Andheri Station from the East

General information
- Coordinates: 19.119167°N 72.846944°E
- System: Mumbai Suburban Railway station
- Owner: Ministry of Railways, Indian Railways
- Lines: Western; Harbour
- Platforms: 9
- Tracks: 9
- Connections: Andheri; BEST Transport

Construction
- Structure type: Standard on-ground station
- Accessible: Yes

Other information
- Status: Active
- Station code: A (Western Line); AD (Harbour Line); ADH (Indian Railways)
- Fare zone: Western Railways

History
- Rebuilt: 2015
- Electrified: Yes
- Former names: Salsette–Trombay railway station

Passengers
- 2016–17: ▲99.6 million
- Rank: 1st on Western Line

Services
Preceding station	Mumbai Suburban Railway	Following station
Vile Parle towards Churchgate	Western line	Jogeshwari towards Dahanu Road
Vile Parle towards Chhatrapati Shivaji Terminus	Harbour line	Jogeshwari towards Goregaon
Out-of-system interchange
Preceding station	Mumbai Metro One	Following station
Azad Nagar towards Versova	Line 1 transfer at Andheri	Western Express Highway towards Ghatkopar
Route map
Location
- Location within Mumbai Location within India

Andheri (station code: A (Western)/AD (Harbour)/ADH (Indian Railways)) is a passenger rail station located in the Andheri suburb of Mumbai, India. It serves the Western line, and Harbour lines of the Mumbai Suburban Railway. It is also a stop for some express trains, and the August Kranti Rajdhani Express. The station also inter-connects with Line 1 of the Andheri metro station. Andheri station first gained prominence after the development of the Salsette–Trombay Railway services in 1928.

With a pre-eminent number of passengers boarding daily, it has been termed "one of the busiest stations" in Mumbai surpassing Ghatkopar station on the Central line. In 2014, the station, along with Jogeshwari and Goregaon stations, was re-developed and expanded with the expenditure of ₹103 crore (US$11 million). In addition, the station has two bus stations operating more than 30 bus routes.

== History ==
A station by the name of "Andaru" existed on the first regular suburban service of the BB&CI Railway the (precursor to Western Railway) when the service started between Bombay Backbay and Viraur on 12 April 1867. By the year 1900, there were three Andheri locals plying from the terminus at Colaba each day.

The suburban section of the BB&CI Railway was electrified and was opened from Colaba to Borivali on 5 January 1928. The Governor of Bombay Sir Leslie Wilson, travelled on board the first electric local from Mahalaxmi (where the ceremony was held), up to Andheri station.

The through lines between Bandra and Andheri were electrified by 15 April 1953. Through lines between Andheri and Borivali were electrified in the coming years as well. In April 1955, a cantilever-type covering was provided along the entirety of the 580-foot island platform of the station, costing Rs. 80,000. The station was also painted, and the foot-over bridge was provided with a covering. On Mahashivratri Day in 1955, around 1 lakh pilgrims were present for visiting the temples. The railways ran extra locals, and certain trains halting at Andheri were extended till Borivali.

A new goods shed and platform were opened on 14 April 1957, built at a cost of Rs. 75,000. The platform was intended to allow quicker loading-unloading operations, and the shed was to provide greater storage space. This was especially for cattle fodder, which had considerable traffic. Around the same period, an overbridge was provided at Andheri to stop accidents at the level crossing.

=== Salsette–Trombay railway service ===
In January 1928, Andheri was connected to Trombay by the Great Indian Peninsular Railway under the Bombay Improvement Trust as Salsette–Trombay Railway line with the objective of opening up a railway line running West to South-east and linking up Andheri and Kurla station. However, in 1934 the line had shut down due to the development of Santacruz Airport.

=== Proposed expansion and re-development ===
The Harbour line of the Andheri station towards Chhatrapati Shivaji Terminus and Panvel serves a total number of 55 trains per day, with 46 running to Chhatrapati Shivaji Maharaj Terminus and 9 towards Panvel. The extension between Andheri and Goregaon of the Harbour Line was completed and had started to operate in 2018.

The station was renovated in early 2015 with the establishment of automated escalators and new Automated Ticket Vending Machines (ATVM) for the ease of booking tickets to the daily passengers. According to the statistics of April 2014 to January 2015, the number of passengers using vending machines was 6,933, whereas in April 2015 to January 2016 it had 18,316 passengers. Due to the increasing number of passengers travelling on the rooftop of the train coaches, Commissioner of Railway Safety (CRS) electrified the train coaches rooftops containing 25,000 volts.

The station has nine platforms, with platform number 1 and 2 serving the Harbour line. Further, the Harbour lines now serves a 12-coach train services. In 2012, it was proposed by the Mumbai Railway Vikas Corporation that the Harbour line trains may get an extension of 12-coaches for the ease of passengers boarding daily from the Western lines. However the MRVC announced that extension of some stations has been completed and the services may start from 2016.

In February 2016, it was reported that the main road of the eastern zone of the station will be re-constructed in according for development of a long delayed elevated auto-rickshaw terminal. The Bombay High Court had ordered to evict the stalls blocking the road. Counsel Anil Sakhare had stated to the court that the stall vendors blocked the construction and infrastructure development and most of the vendors opposed the eviction notice given to them. The work was originally started in 2011 and was to complete in December 2013 but as the corporation was unable to evict the stalls, the work was kept on hold. However, the Brihanmumbai Municipal Corporation had removed the stalls from the road and the construction for the terminal had been started. It has a two-lane terminal measuring the height of 60 metres (200 ft) and a width of 34 metres (112 ft) which connects the Andheri-Kurla road. Under the second phase of MUTP, three escalators and 2 lifts will be installed.

== Platforms ==
Platform Number	Towards (in the context of Mumbai Suburban)
1	Harbour Line slow services terminating at Goregaon
2	Harbour Line slow services terminating at CSMT and Panvel Some slow services towards Churchgate
3	Slow services terminating at Borivali and Virar
4	Slow services beginning from Andheri, toward Churchgate and Virar
5	Slow services terminating at Churchgate
6	Fast services terminating at Virar and Dahanu Road
7	Fast services terminating at Dadar and Churchgate
8	Fast services beginning at Andheri and terminating at Churchgate or Virar
9	Fast services beginning at Andheri and terminating at Churchgate or Virar

Express trains which have a halt at Andheri (e.g, Flying Ranee Express) arrive at platforms 6, 7, 8 or 9 depending on platform availability.

== Traffic ==
Andheri is the busiest station on the Western Railway network. Over 99.6 million passengers' journeys originated at the station during the 2016–17 fiscal year. During the same period, the station sold ₹2.41 crore (US$250,000) worth of tickets (or 9% of all tickets sold on the Western Line) and 890,000 season passes, earning WR a total revenue of ₹59.50 crore (US$6.2 million). An average of 66,152 tickets and 2,441 season passes were sold at the station daily, and an average of 256,561 passengers began their journeys at Andheri per day contributing ₹1,632,994 (US$17,000) of average daily revenue.

== Station layout ==
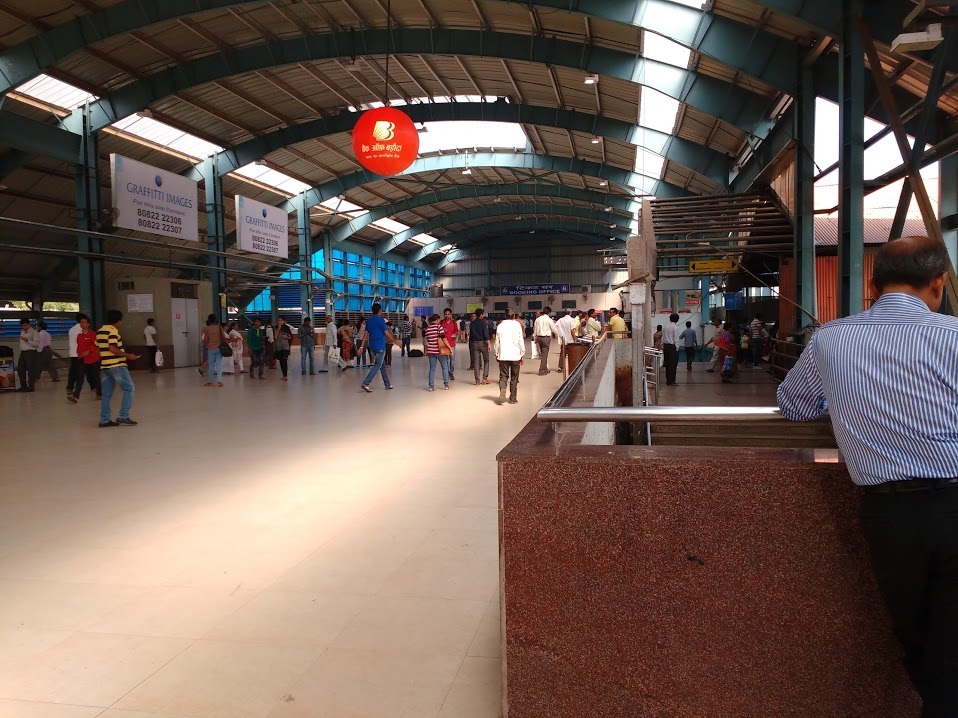
The interior of Andheri station terminal

Stations		Stations between platforms
Platforms (HR)/(WR)	Direction (Harbour line)	← Harbour line towards Chhatrapati Shivaji Terminus or Panvel ←
Platforms (HR)/(WR)	Side platform, directions on the left
Platforms (HR)/(WR)	Direction (Western line)	← Western line towards Churchgate ←
Platforms (WR)	Direction (Western line)	→ Western line towards Dahanu →
Platforms (WR)	Side platform, directions on the right

The station consists of a 100 metres (330 ft)-long auto-rickshaw terminal at the eastern zone of Andheri. It has been built between the northern and middle foot-over bridges of the station and its connected to the northern bridge and continues down a road to the MV Road. In addition, the auto-rickshaw services are used for the passengers crossing through the Nityanand Road from the northern bridge to get down the road at the eastern bridge of the station. However, the designed structure was used for commuters serving as the only foot overbridge for the metro station as the terminal was kept unused.

== Transport ==
=== Metro–Local connection ===
In February 2014, It was proposed by the Mumbai Metropolitan Region Development Authority to integrate the Andheri metro station with the suburban station with the development of the skywalk and the same was proposed for the Ghatkopar metro station.

After the establishment of Mumbai Metro services In June 2014, a skywalk of 12 metres (39 ft) has been developed by the MMRDA for the passengers traveling from local station to the metro station. The skywalk has been built opposite to the auto-rickshaw terminal of the station with an expenditure of ₹6.04 crore (US$630,000).

=== Bus connections ===
The Oshiwara depot serves as a major hub and transfer point for Andheri bus routes serving the western area. All routes pull into the station's busway off Yari Road bus station, though some can be caught at Goregaon via the station's bus depot entrance as well. The eastern area is connected by buses between Agarkar Chowk Depot and Majas Depot, Ghatkopar Depot, Kurla Depot and Mulund Depot. But due to the increment of the Mumbai Metro service fare rates, the Ghatkopar-Andheri bus services proved to be a beneficial deal for the passengers.

== Gallery ==
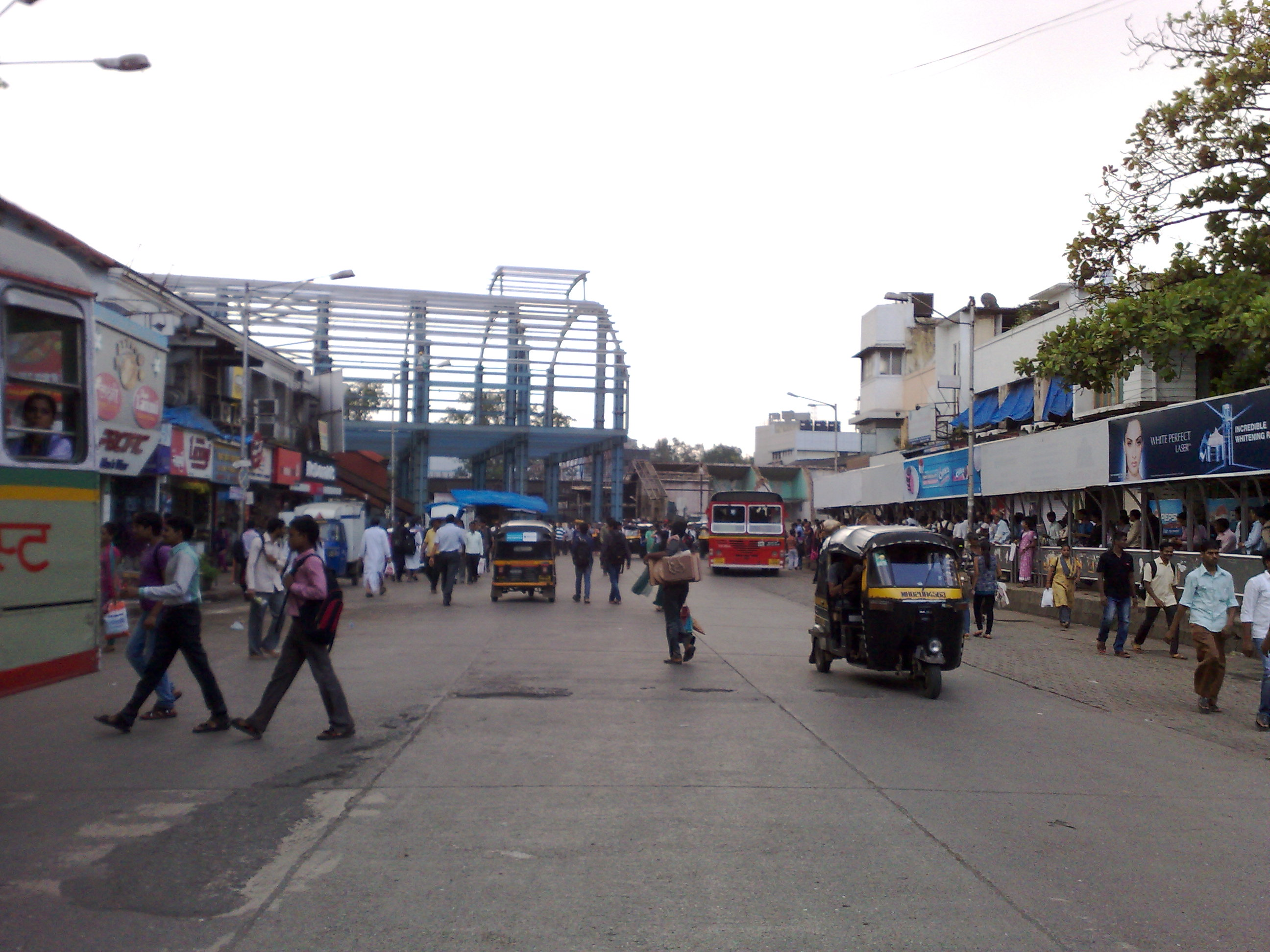
Andheri Station - West Entrance

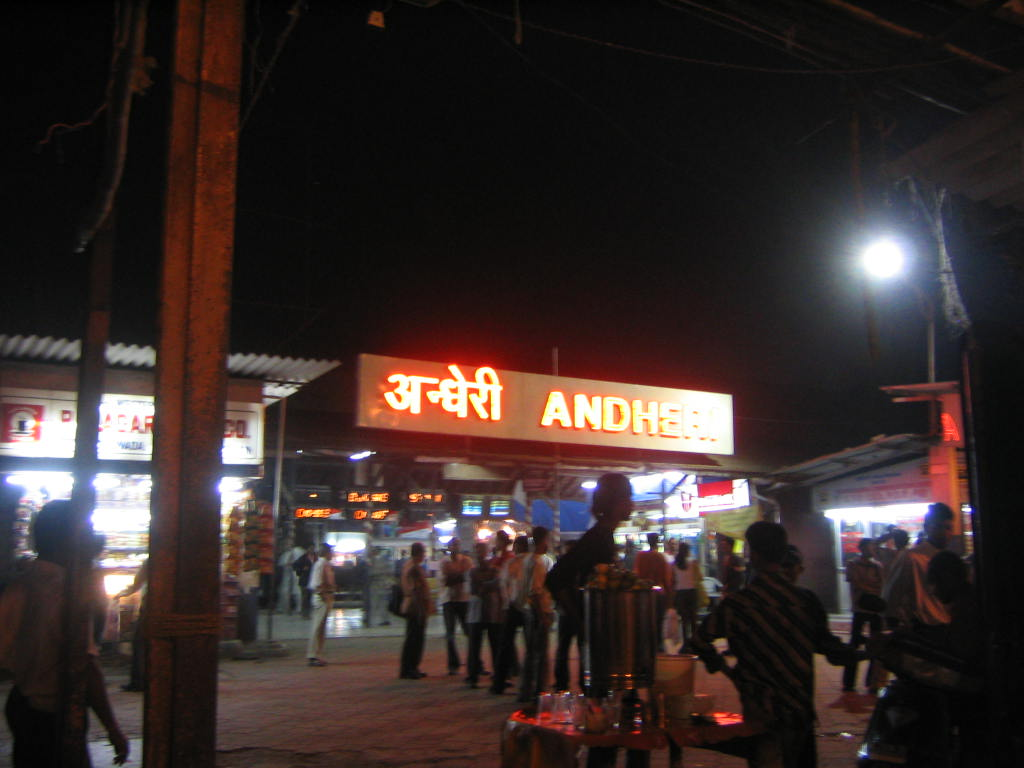
Andheri station at night

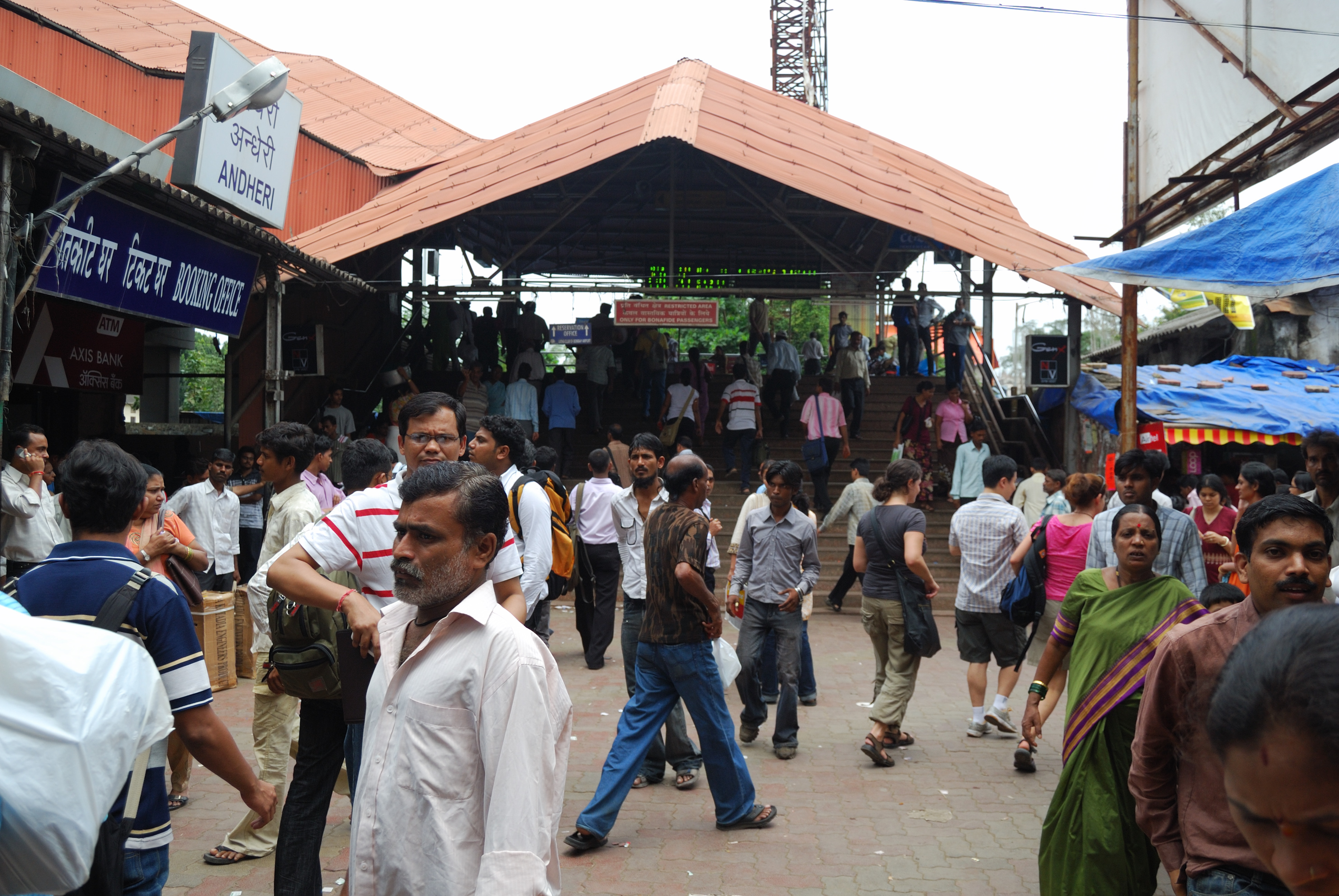
Andheri Station entrance

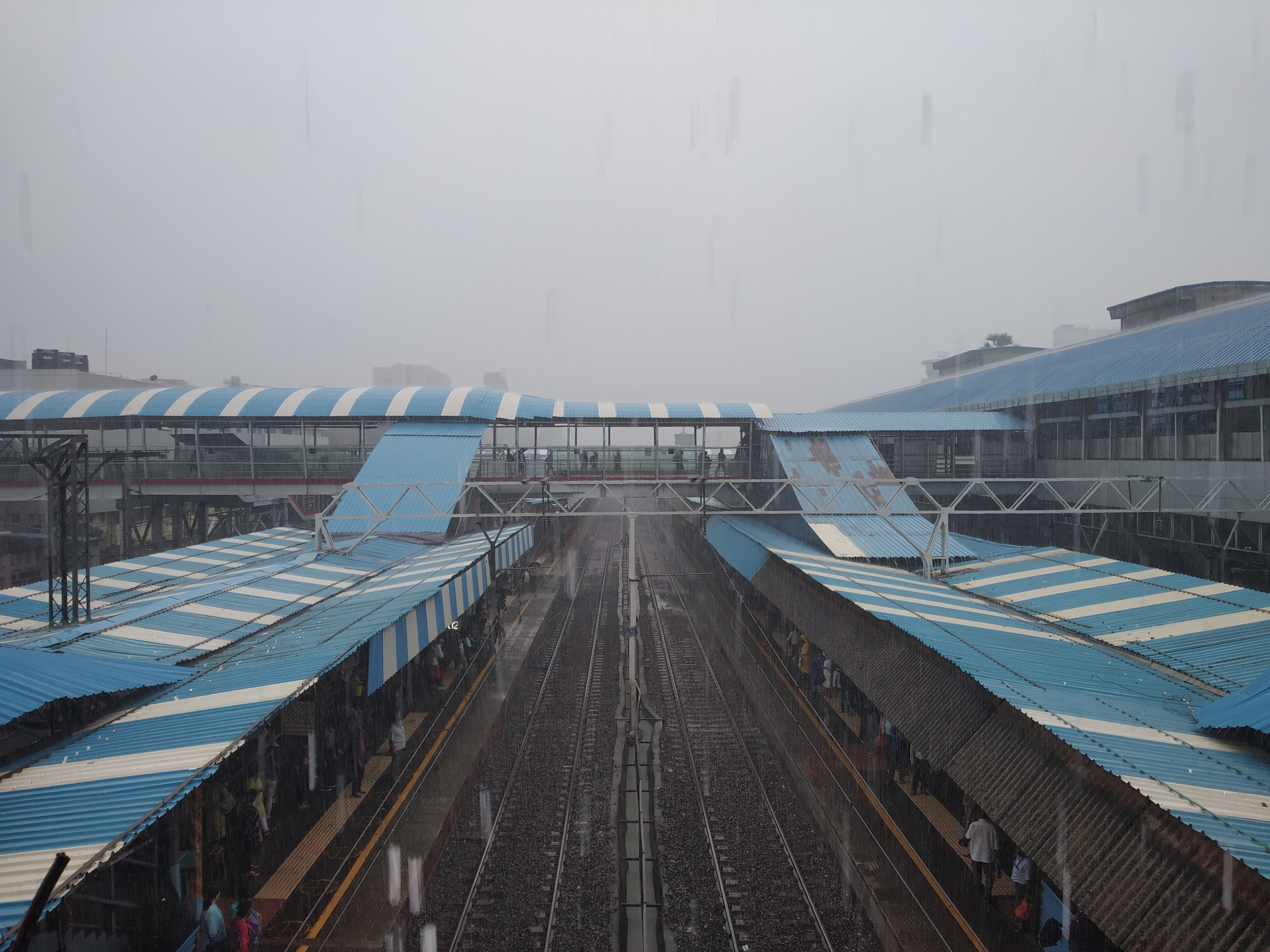
View of the station from a FoB

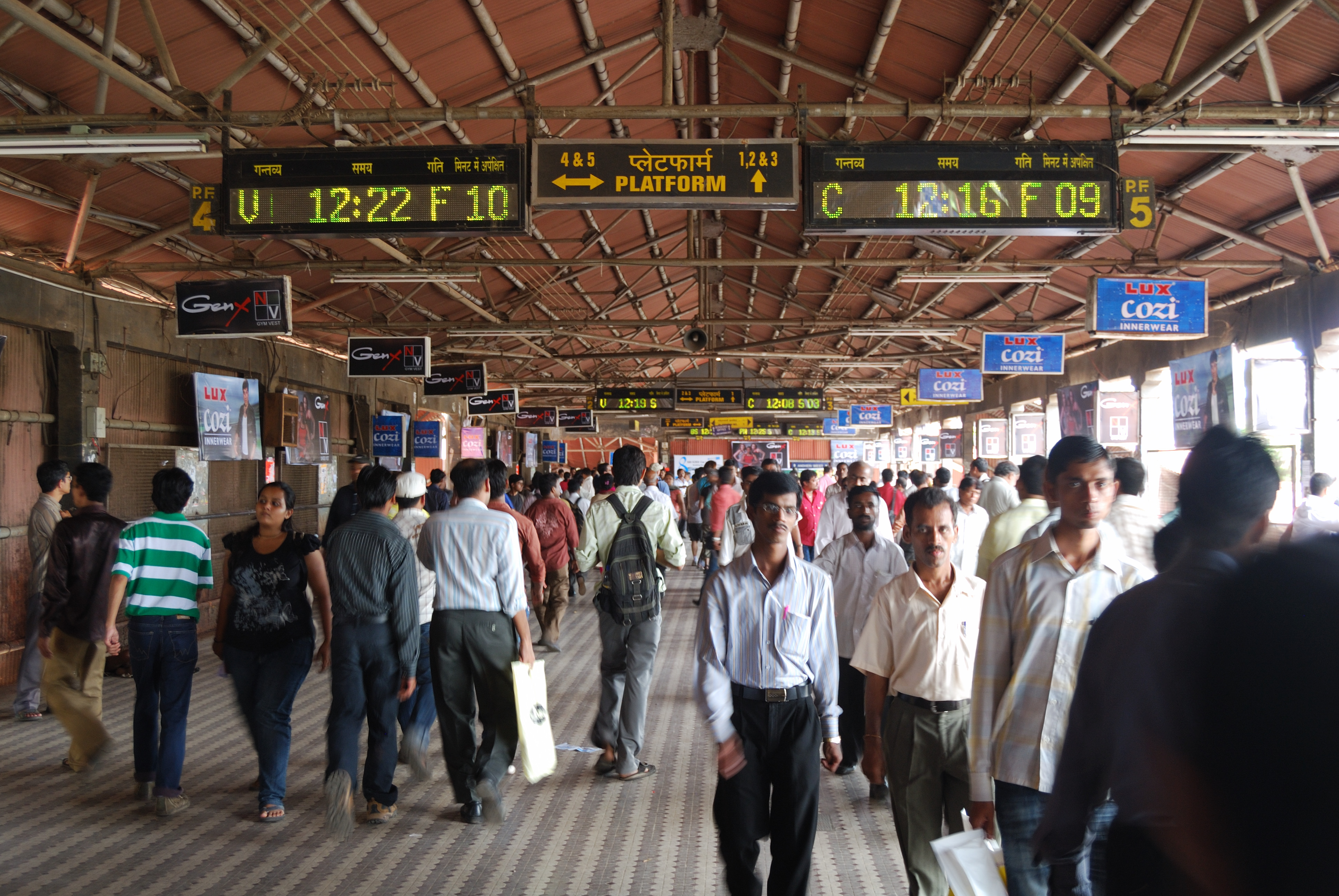
Crowd inside a FoB at Andheri station

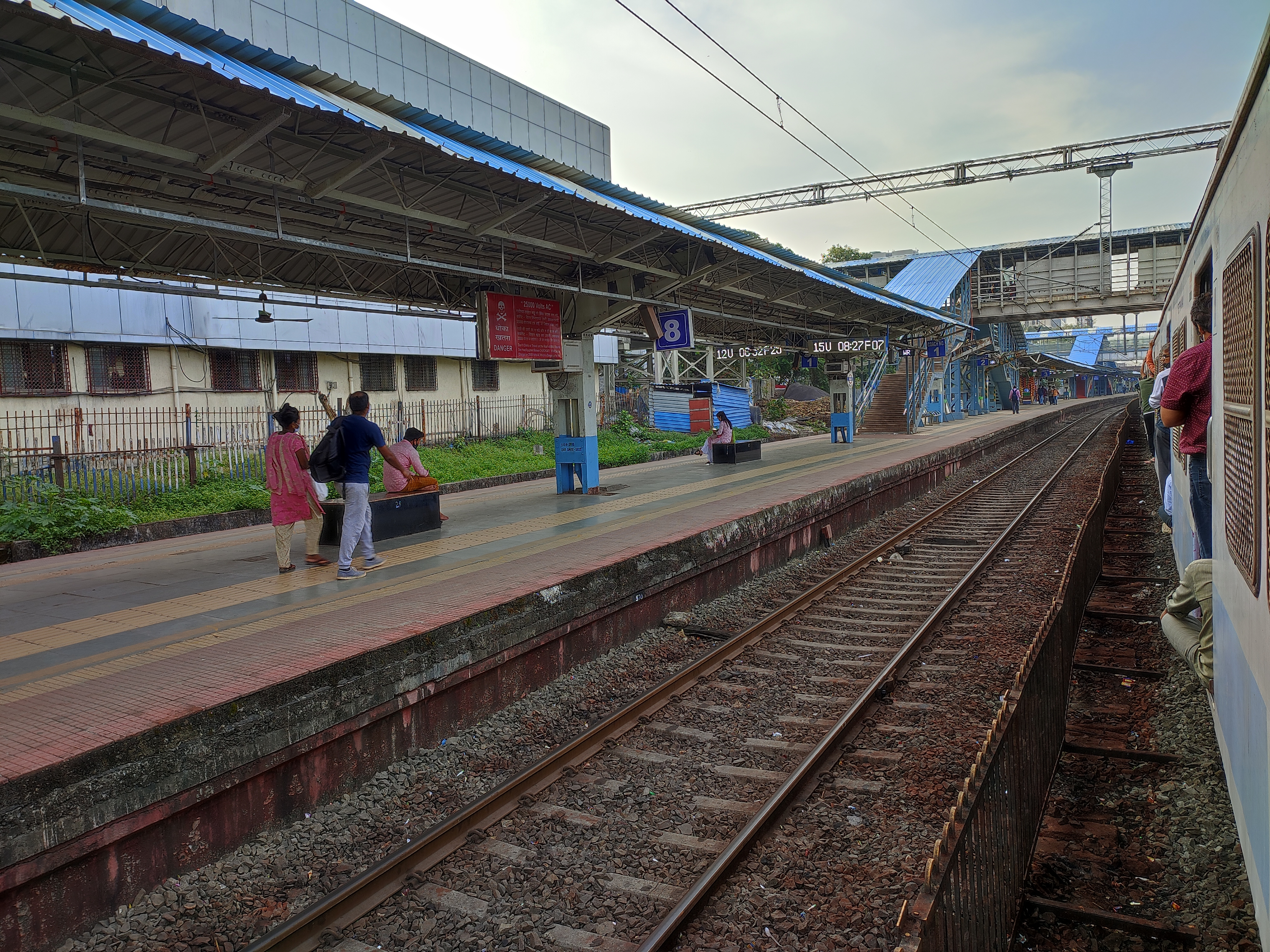
View of Andheri station platform 8

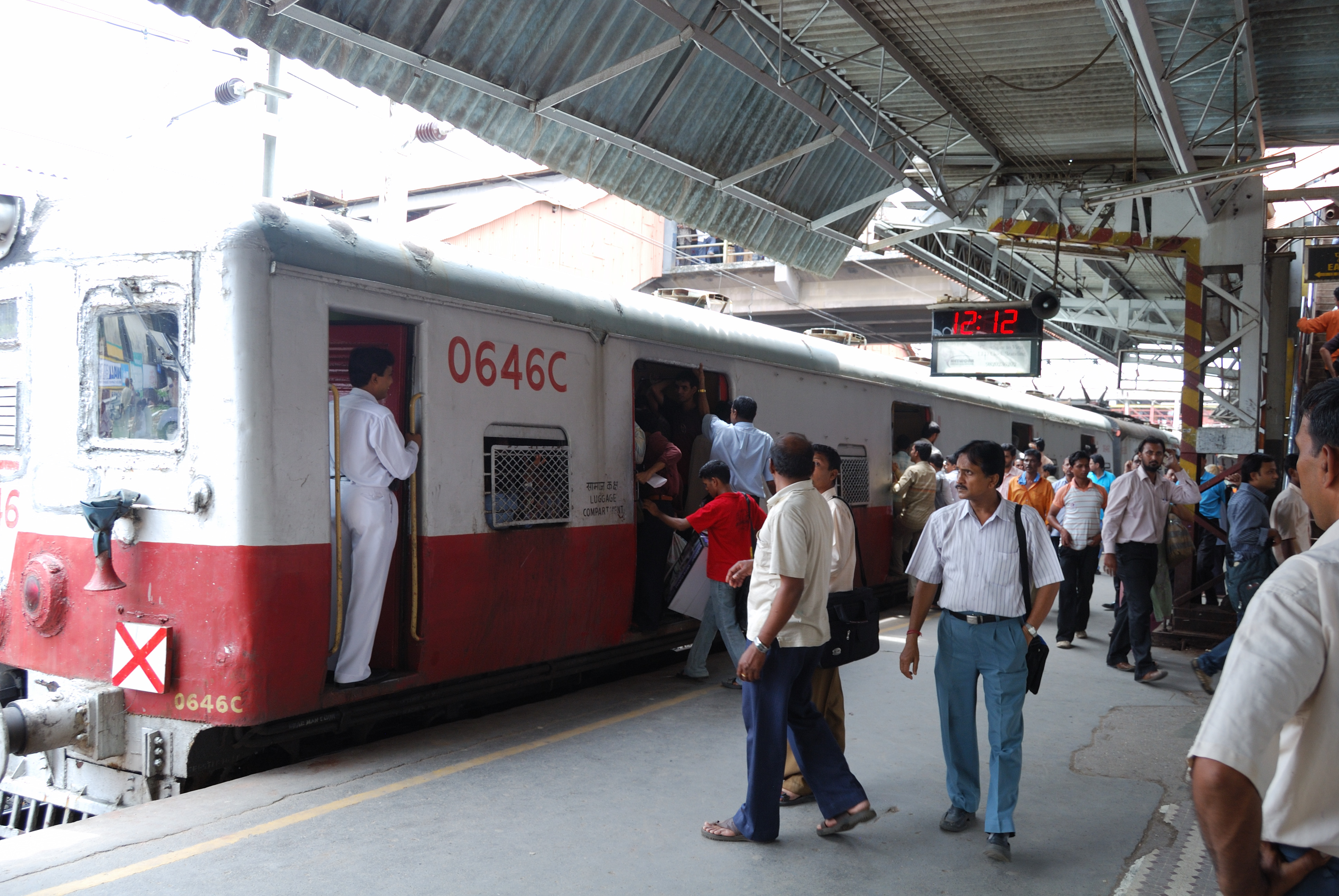
Old image of a Local train at Andheri Station

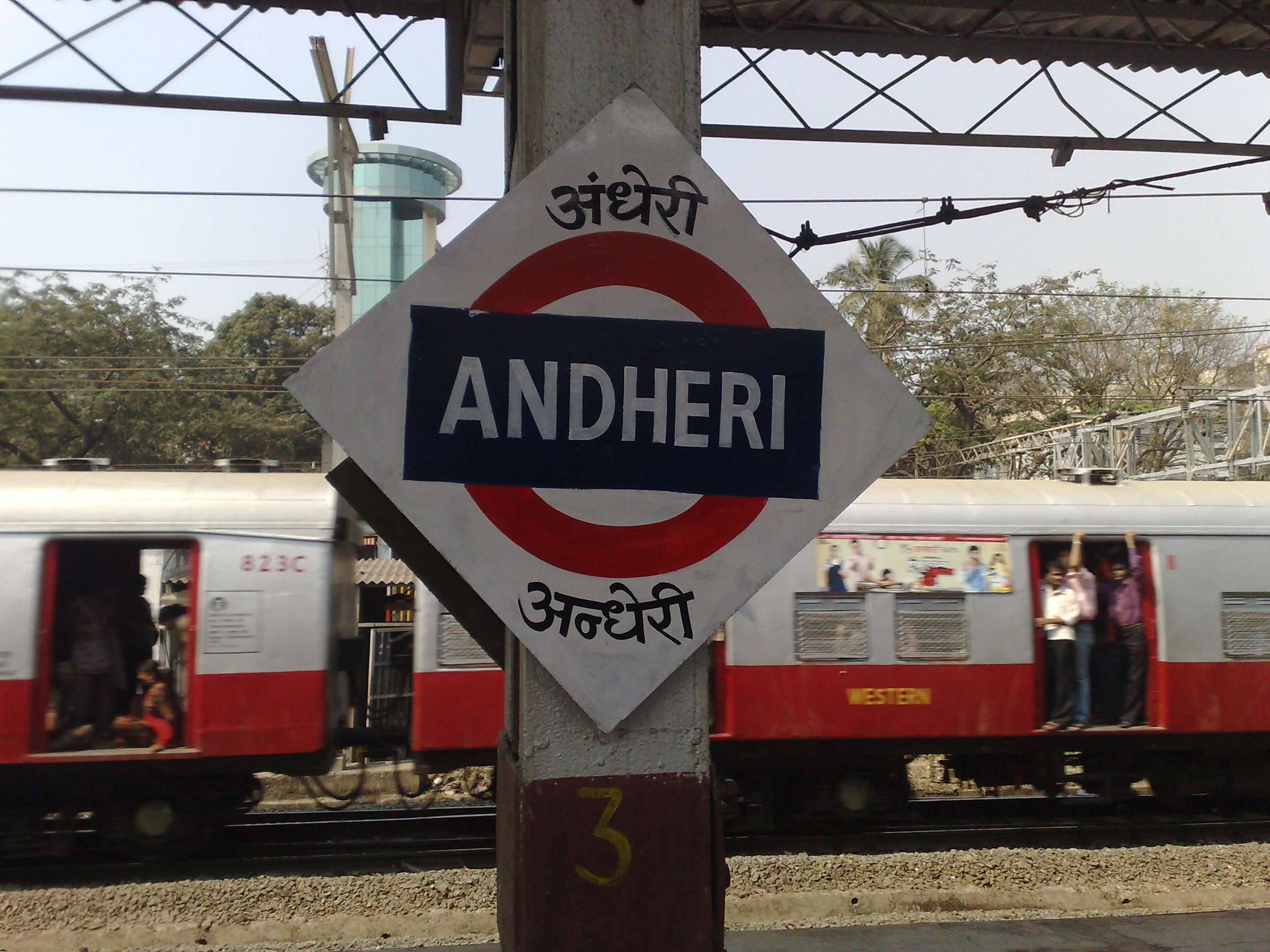
Platform signboard

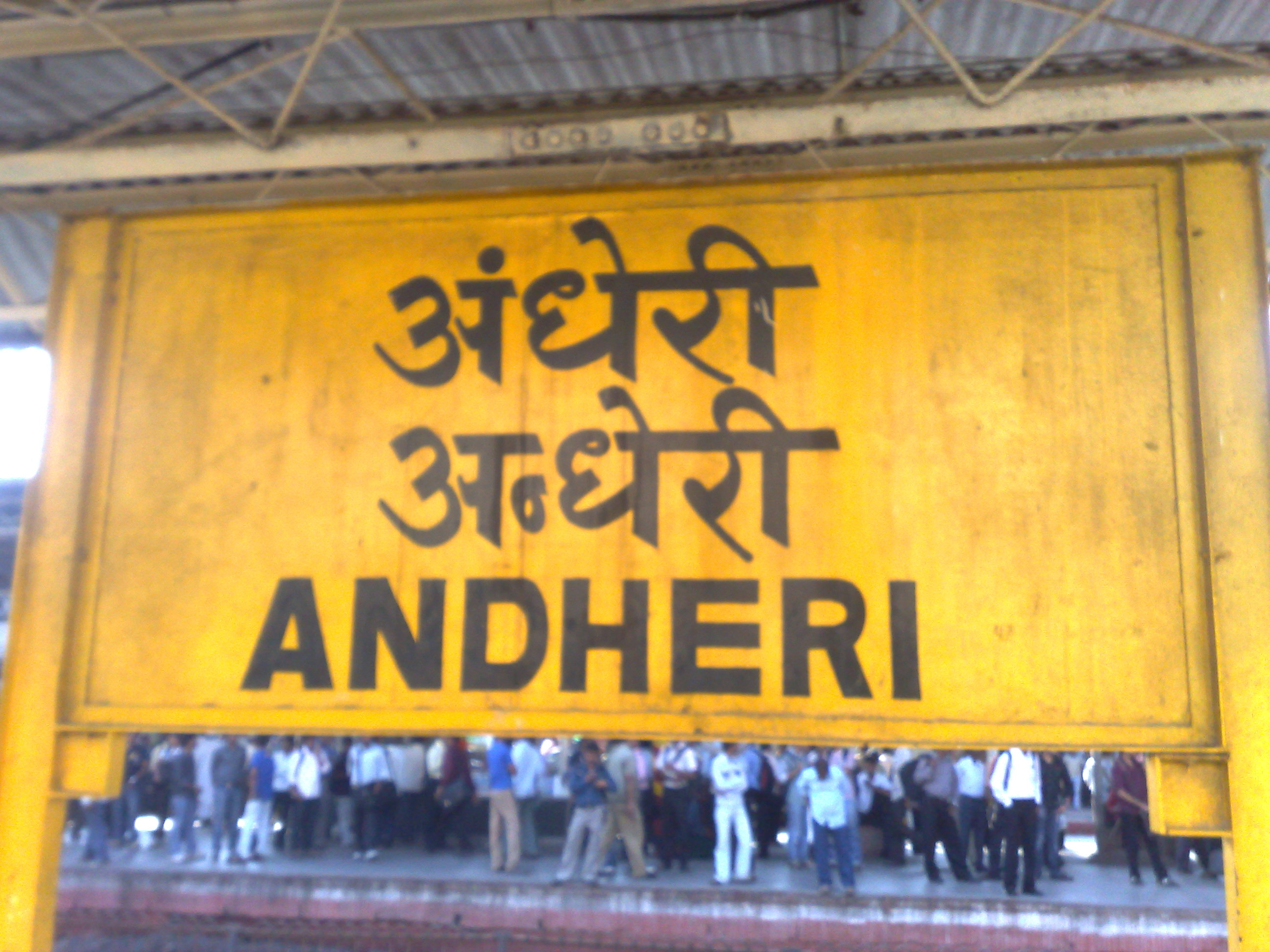
Station board at Andheri station
