= Malad River =

Malad River may refer to:

- Malad River (Gooding County, Idaho), a stream in southern Idaho, United States, that is a tributary of the Snake River and flows through Thousand Springs State Park
- Malad River (Idaho-Utah), a stream in southeastern Idaho and northern Utah in the western United States that is a tributary of the Bear River (a tributary of the Great Salt Lake)

== See also ==
- Malad Creek
- Malad
