= Ram Mandir railway station =

Station on Mumbai Suburban Railway

Ram Mandir

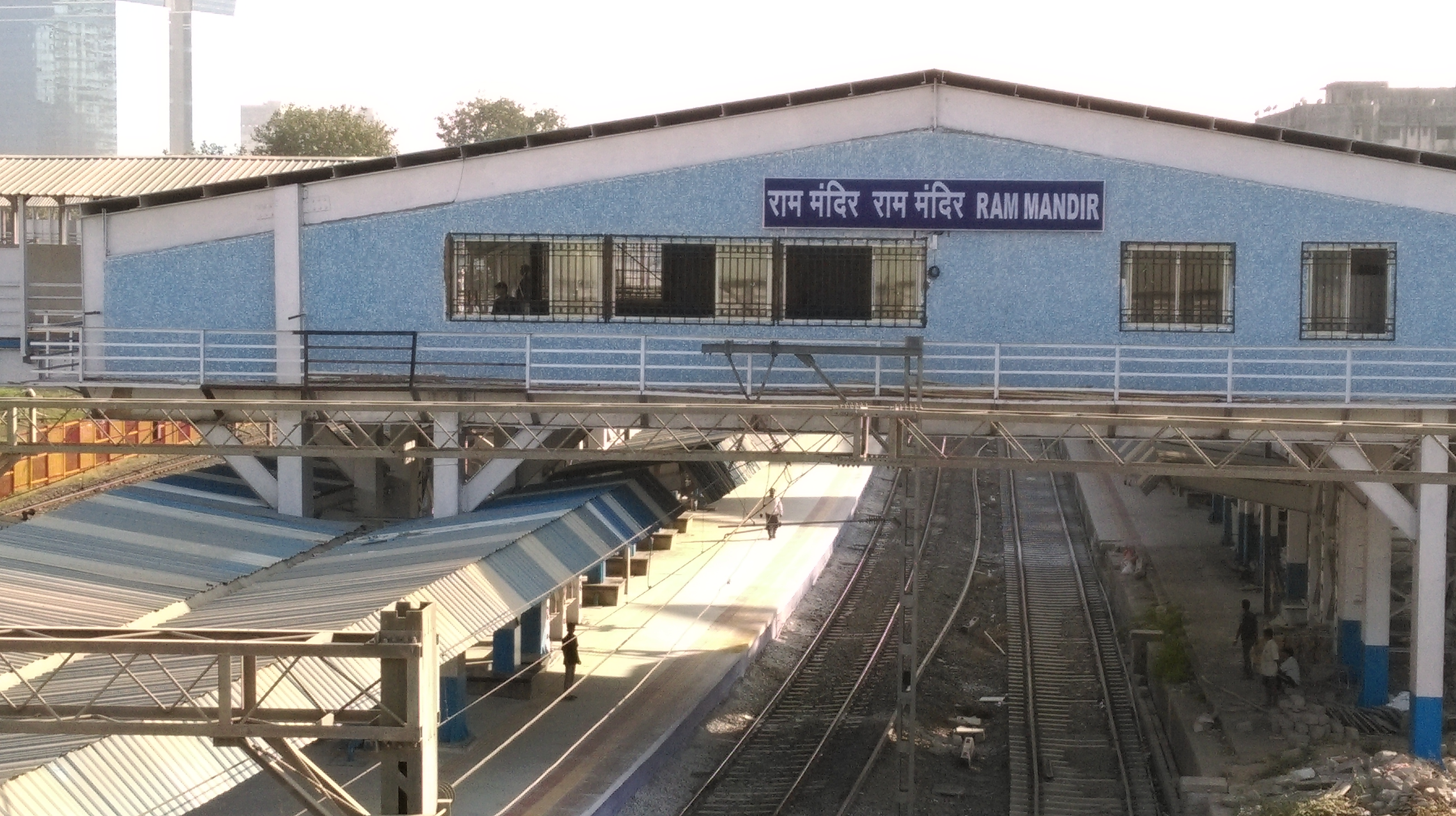

General information
- Location: R-8, Ram Mandir Road, Somani Gram, Goregaon West, Mumbai; India
- Coordinates: 19.151006°N 72.850144°E
- Elevation: 7 metres (23 ft)
- System: Mumbai Suburban Railway station
- Owner: Indian Railways
- Lines: Western Line, Harbour Line
- Platforms: 4
- Tracks: 7

Construction
- Structure type: Standard on-ground station
- Accessible: Disabled access

Other information
- Status: Active
- Station code: RMAR
- Fare zone: Western Railways

History
- Opened: 22 December 2016

Services
Preceding station	Mumbai Suburban Railway	Following station
Jogeshwari towards Churchgate	Western line	Goregaon towards Dahanu Road
Jogeshwari towards Chhatrapati Shivaji Terminus	Harbour line	Goregaon Terminus
Route map
Location
- Location within Mumbai

Ram Mandir railway station (station code: RMAR), on the Western and Harbour lines of the Mumbai Suburban Railway, serves the Oshiwara locality of Mumbai. The station is located between Jogeshwari railway station, and Goregaon railway station and is named after the century-old temple of Lord Ram in its vicinity. The station was opened to commuters on 22 December 2016.

== History ==
The Ram Mandir Road station, the 37th station on the Western Line, was inaugurated on 22 December 2016 by Railway Minister Suresh Prabhu, after seemingly interminable stages of construction since 2008. Its first train, running from Churchgate to Borivli, arrived at 6:00 p.m. while another, "bound for Churchgate" pulled up at 6:10 p.m.

The distance between Jogeshwari and Goregaon stations was considered long enough, and hence this station was created.

The station has four platforms, two each for Western line slow trains, and two for the Harbour line section. The Harbour line was extended to Goregaon on 29 March 2018.
