= Jogeshwari railway station =

Railway station in Mumbai, Maharashtra, India

Jogeshwari

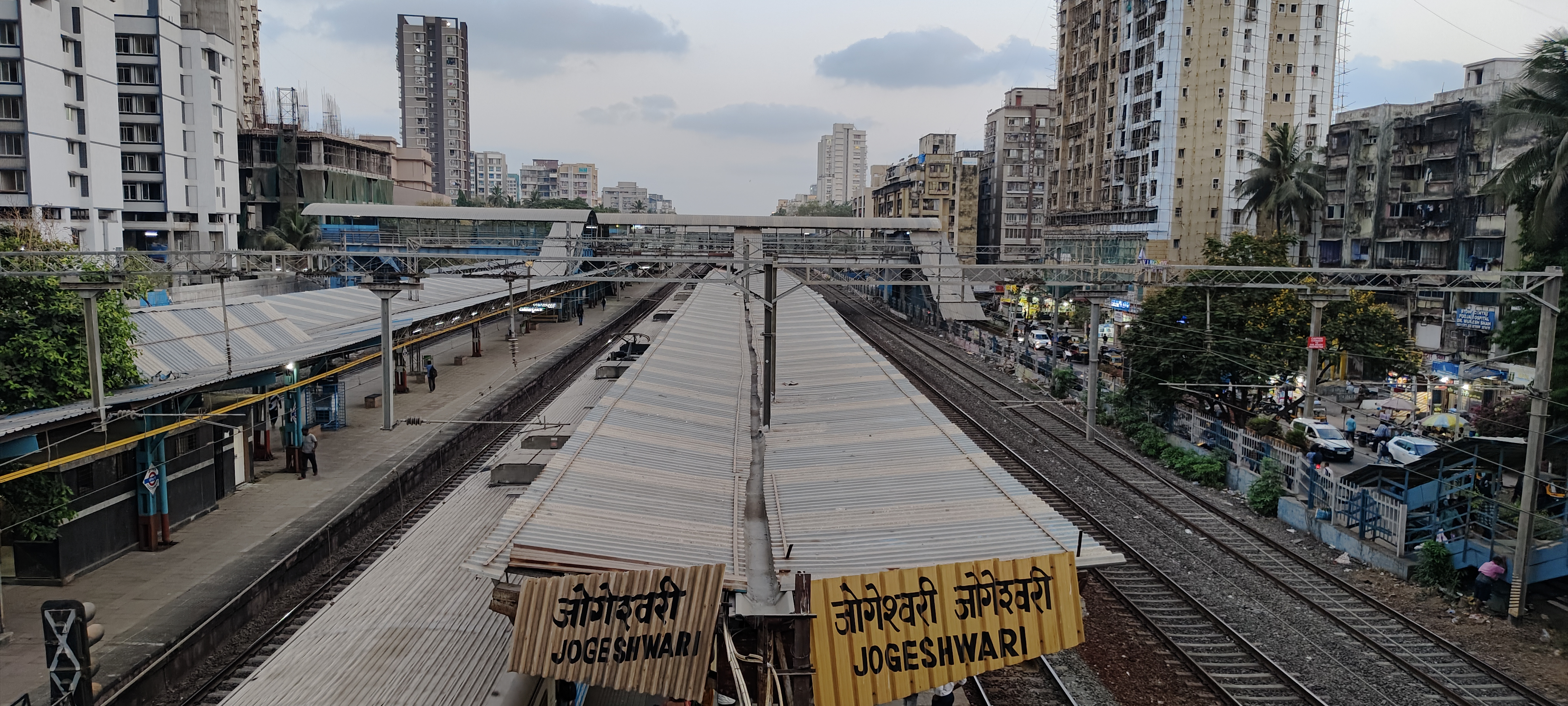

General information
- Coordinates: 19.1365°N 72.8490°E
- System: Mumbai Suburban Railway station
- Owner: Ministry of Railways, Indian Railways
- Line: Western Line
- Platforms: 6
- Tracks: 7

Construction
- Structure type: At grade

Other information
- Status: Active
- Station code: JOS
- Fare zone: Western Railways

Services
Preceding station	Mumbai Suburban Railway	Following station
Andheri towards Churchgate	Western line	Ram Mandir towards Dahanu Road
Andheri towards Chhatrapati Shivaji Terminus	Harbour line	Ram Mandir towards Goregaon
Route map
Location
- Location within Mumbai

Jogeshwari (station code: JOS) is a railway station in the Jogeshwari suburb of Mumbai city, in Maharashtra. The station lies on the Western line of the Mumbai Suburban Railway network between Andheri and Ram Mandir railway stations. On 29 March 2018 Harbour line was extended from Mumbai CSMT to Goregaon.

== History ==
Jogeshwari railway station was opened after 1930/31. In the 1950s, the yard at Bombay Central (now Mumbai Central) was remodelled, in an attempt to provide additional stabling and washing facilities for coaches. The grass yard situated north of the Terminus was shifted to Jogeshwari to create space for the remodelled yard.

On 2 December 1961, two additional platforms were inaugurated at Jogeshwari by the then Union Defence minister, Krishna Menon. This helped, in part, to transform the rail-level platform station that was gradually developing into a modern station. New additions included a new platform that was 675 ft long, and 20 ft wide, having a 300 ft cantilever covering on the Down line (local). An island platform was also provided, being 675 ft long, and 35 ft wide, serving both the Up and Down lines. A waiting hall was provided for passengers, and coverings were installed on the entire FoB. Further, the pan-type lavatory on the island platform was converted to flush-type, and additionally, a seven-seat lavatory block of the flush-type was also added.

During the inauguration, it was highlighted by the railways that the amenities available on the suburban railway then, were fit for the volumes of traffic prevalent several decades earlier. It was stated that the railways were attentive to the needs of the public, and several new facilities were being planned at various suburban stations.

== Platforms ==
Jogeshwari Station has 6 platforms, of which the two for the Harbour line are constructed towards the north of main platforms. It also features an island platform, 600 metres in length.

== Gallery ==
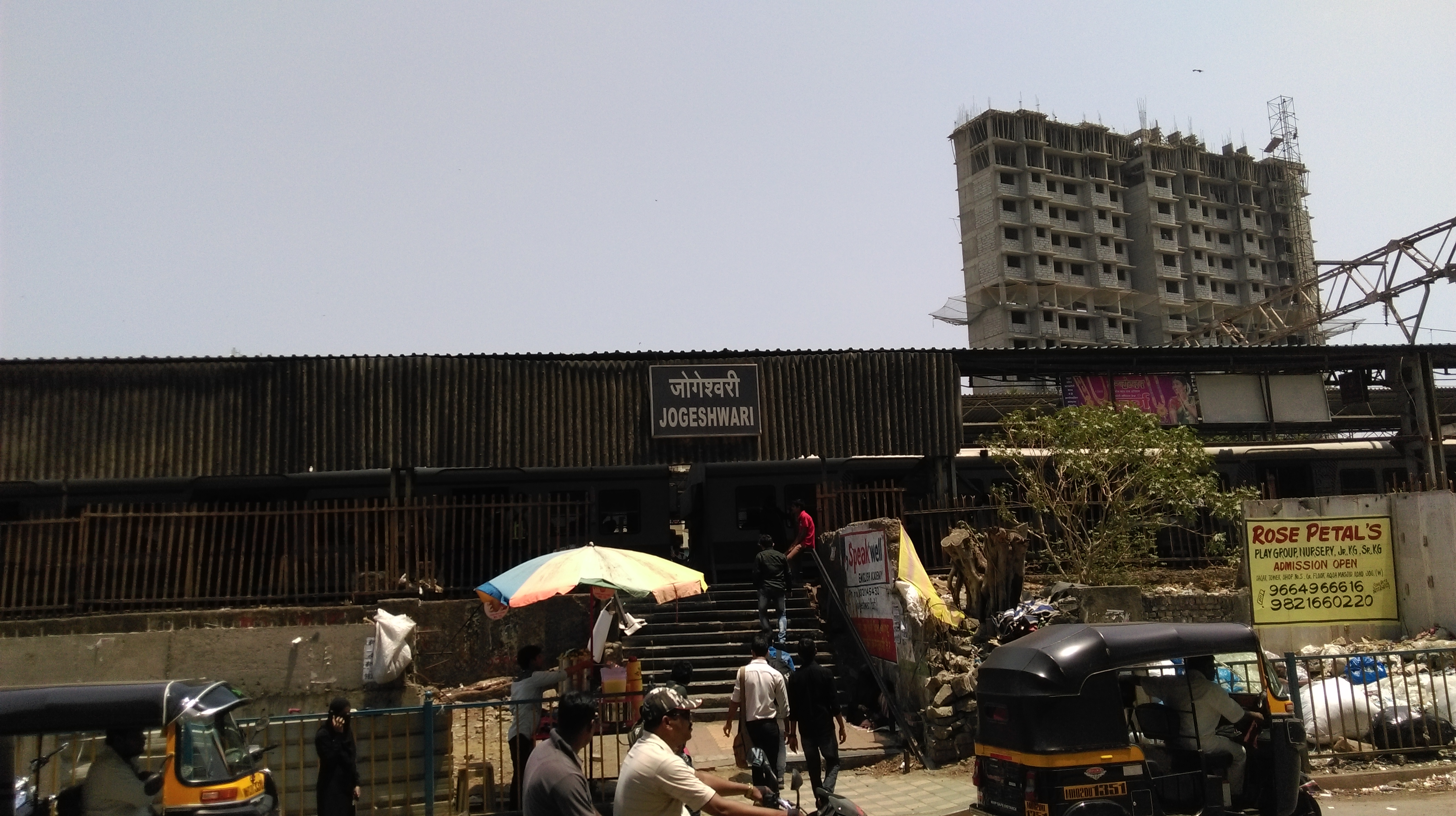
Jogeshwari railway station - Entrance

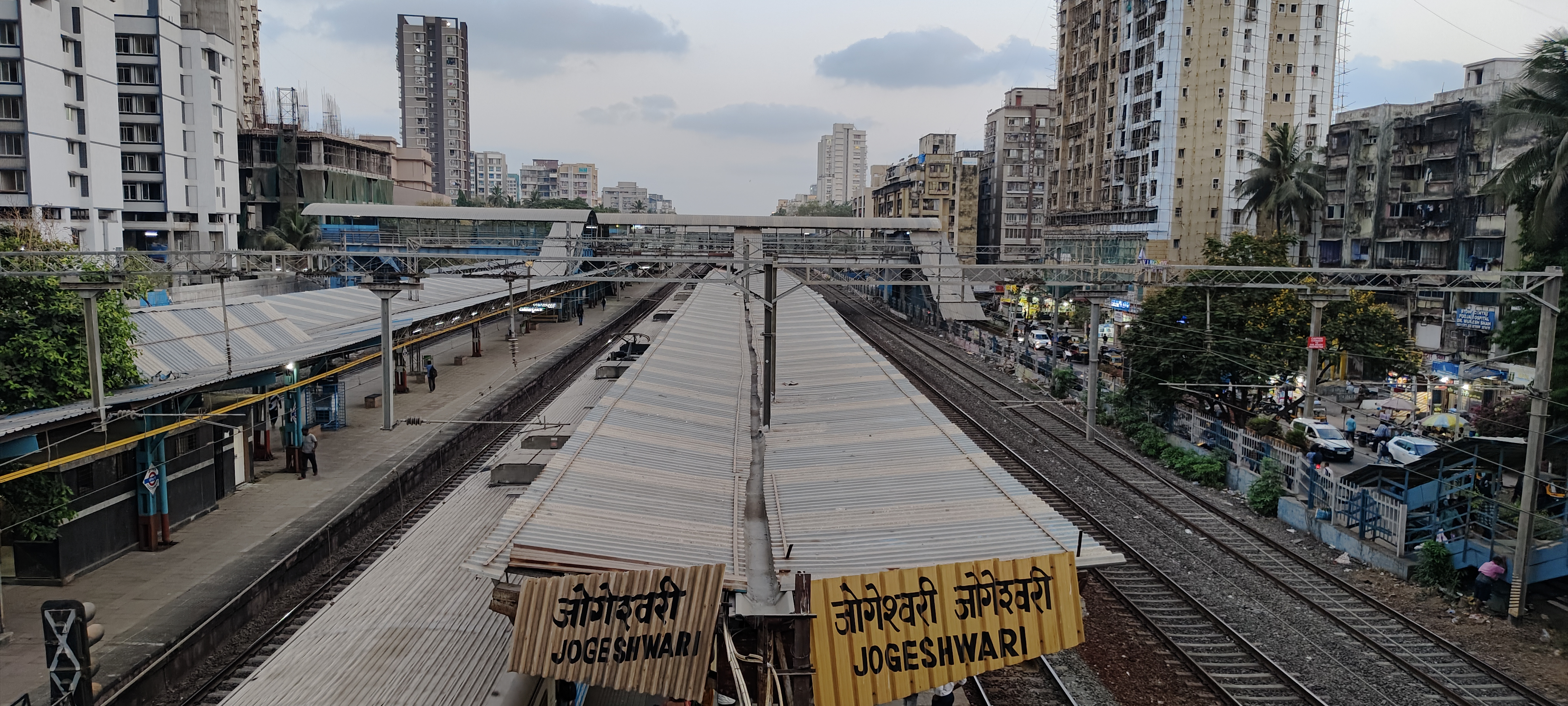
Jogeshwari railway stationː View from FoB

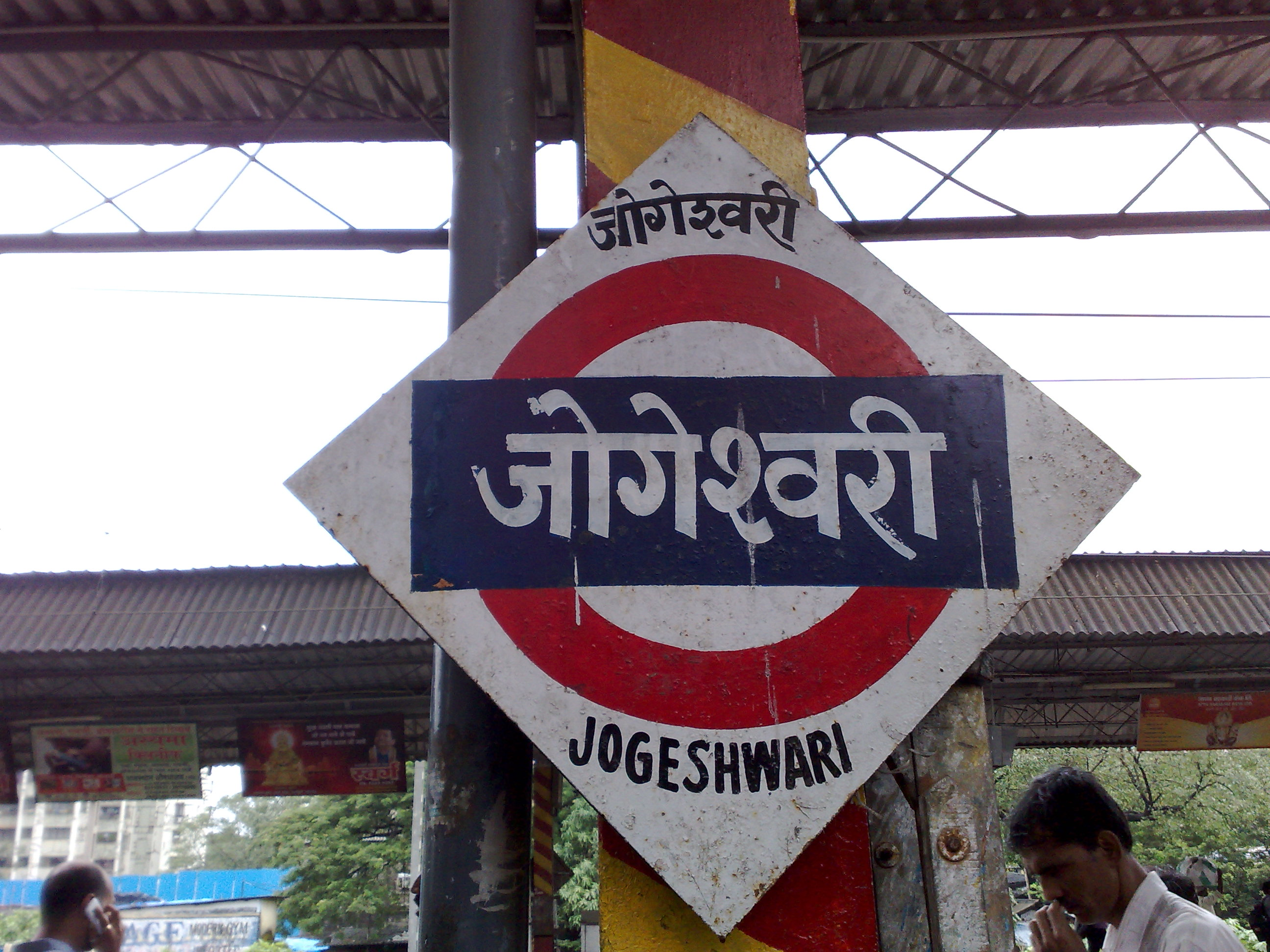
Jogeshwari Station Platform Board
