= Goregaon railway station =

Railway station in Mumbai, India

Goregaon

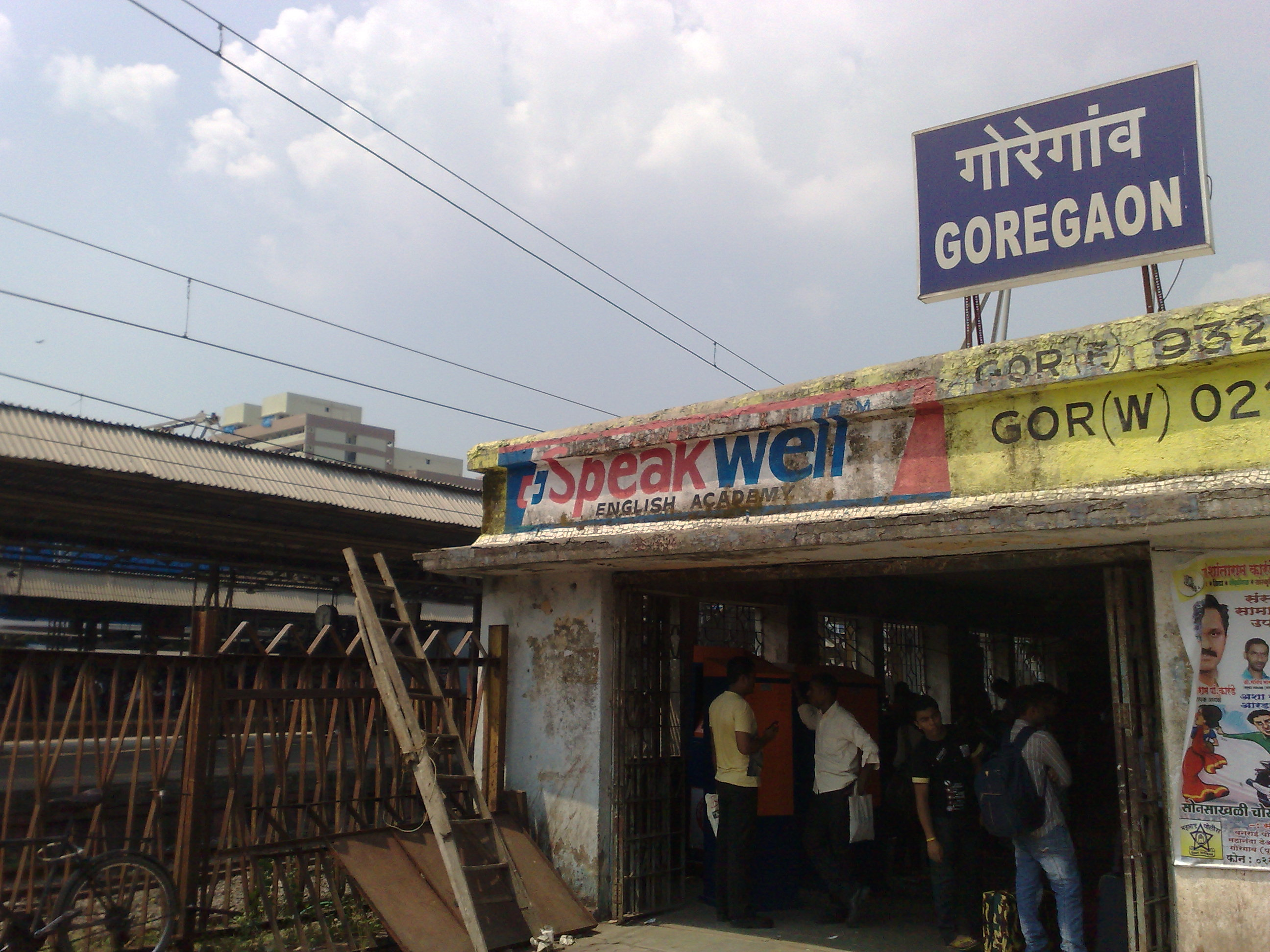

General information
- Coordinates: 19°9′51.85″N 72°50′58.13″E
- System: Mumbai Suburban Railway station
- Owner: Ministry of Railways, Indian Railways
- Lines: Western Line, Harbour Line
- Platforms: 7
- Tracks: 8

Construction
- Structure type: Standard on-ground station
- Platform levels: Upper(Concource) Lower(Platforms)
- Parking: No

Other information
- Status: Active
- Station code: GO (suburban); GMN (mainline)
- Fare zone: Western Railway zone

Passengers
- 2012-13: 2,85,204

Services
Preceding station	Mumbai Suburban Railway	Following station
Ram Mandir towards Churchgate	Western line	Malad towards Dahanu Road
Ram Mandir towards Chhatrapati Shivaji Terminus	Harbour line	Terminus
Route map
Location
- Location within India Location within Mumbai

Goregaon (Marathi pronunciation: [ɡoːɾeɡaːʋ], formerly Goregaumn, station code: GMN) is a railway station on the Western line and the Harbour line of the Mumbai Suburban Railway network. It serves the Mumbai suburb of Goregaon.

The Harbour line which previously ran from Mumbai CSMT till Andheri was extended till Goregaon in March 2018 (the first service ran on March 29, 2018). The line is expected to be extended to Borivali in the coming years.

== Station Upgrades ==
A ₹103 crore remodel for Andheri, Jogeshwari, and Goregaon stations was completed in 2014.

== Gallery ==
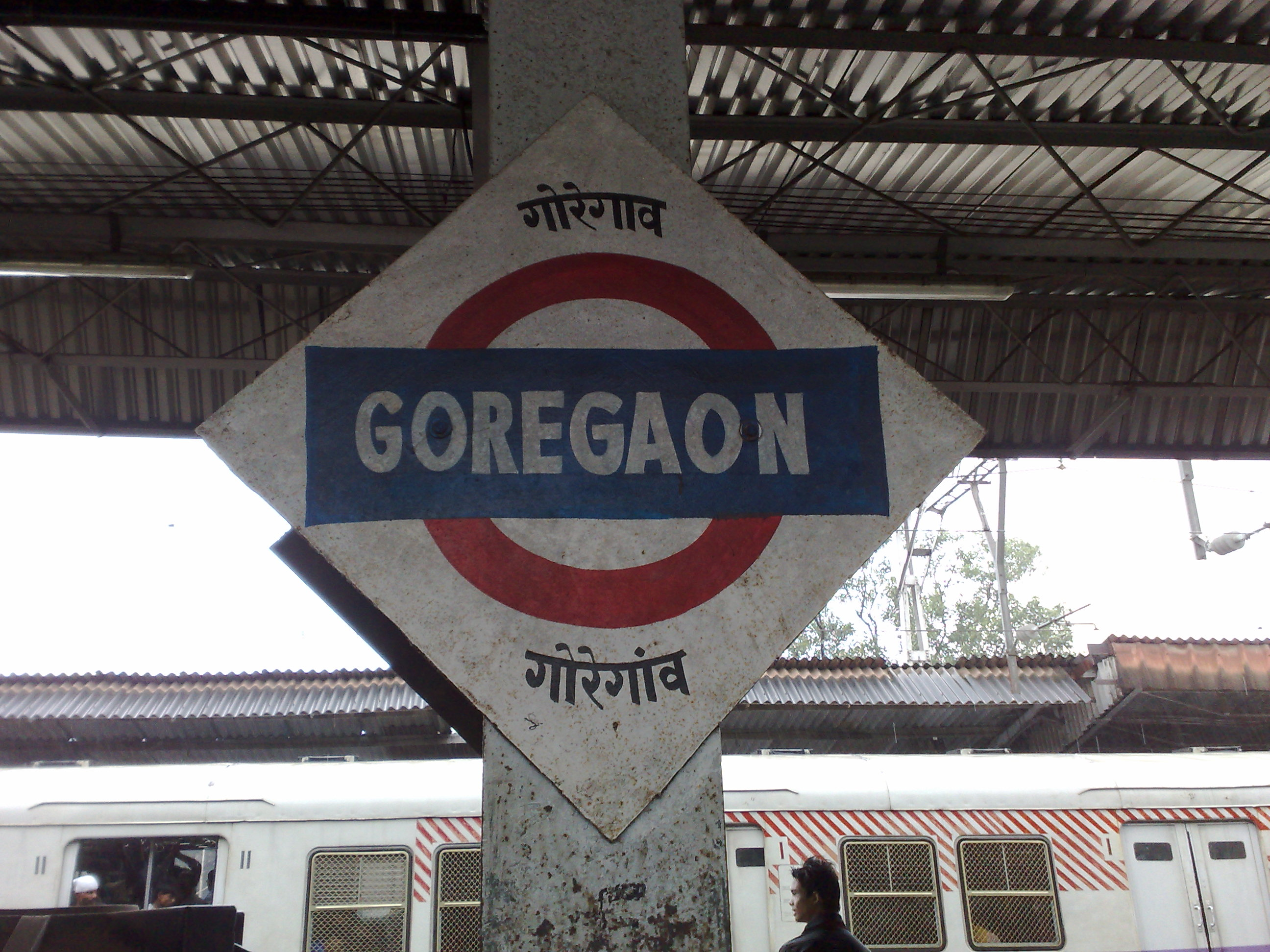
Goregaon stationboard

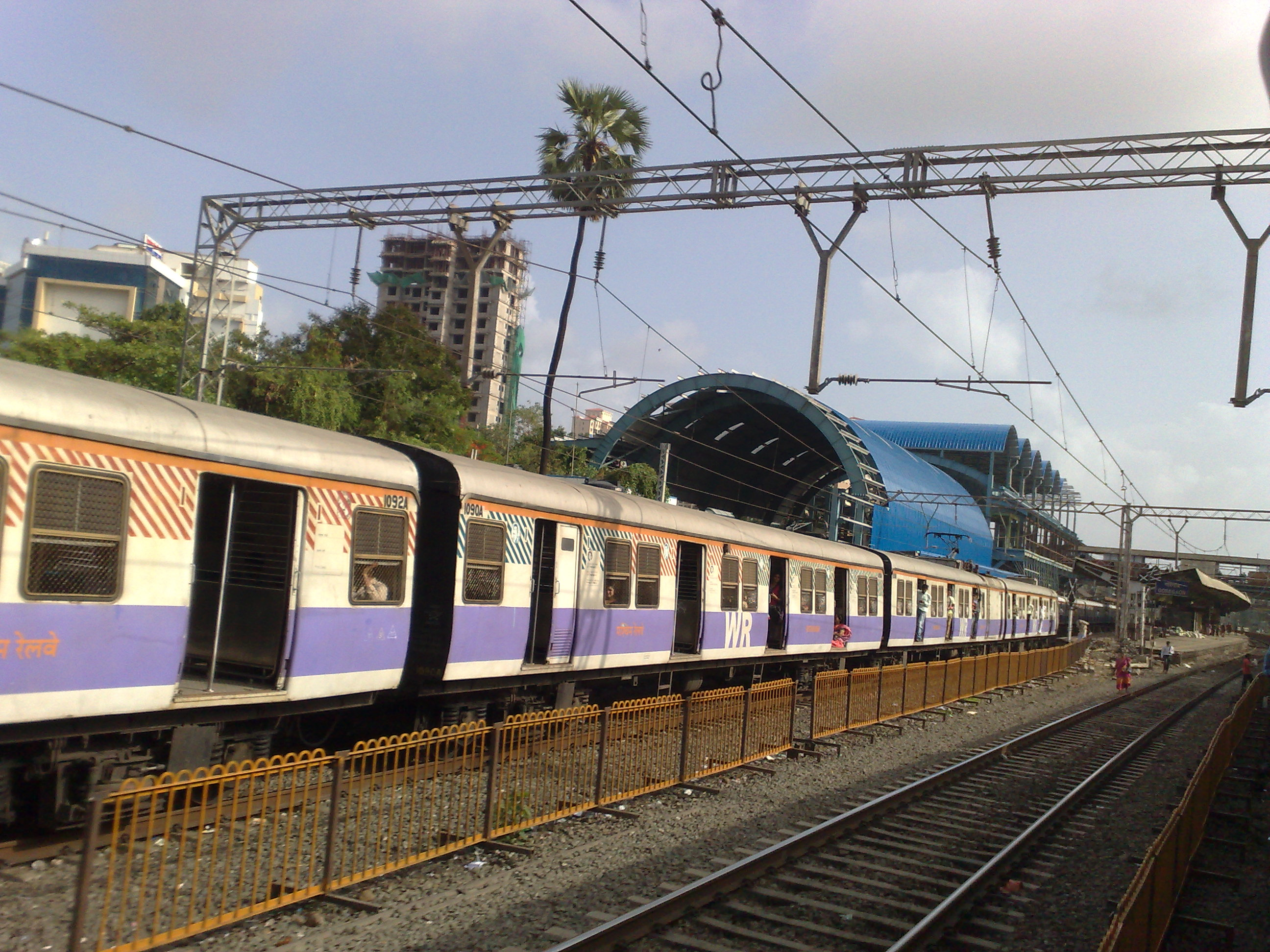
Harbour Line station under construction at Goregaon
