= Oshiwara River =

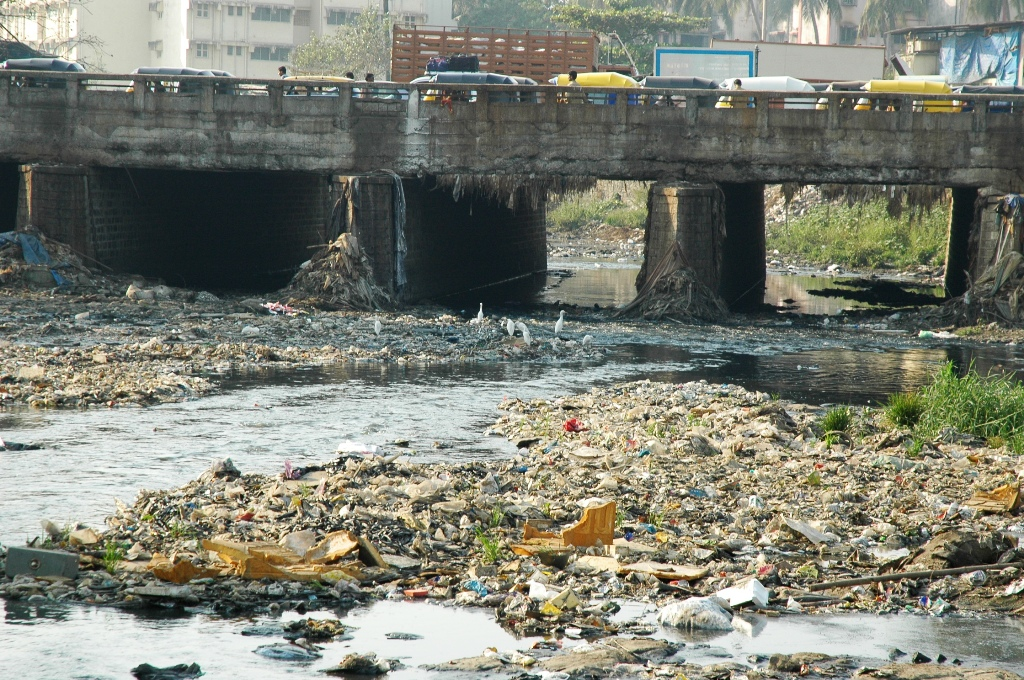
- Filth choking Oshiwara river in Jan 2006

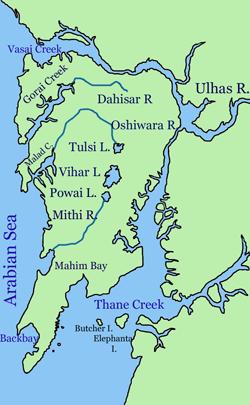
- The Oshiwara River is in the north face

Location
- Country: India
- State: Maharashtra
- City: Mumbai

Physical characteristics
- Source: Aarey Forest
  - location: Mumbai suburban district, India
- Mouth
  - location: Arabian Sea, India
  - coordinates: 19°09′33″N 72°48′59″E
  - elevation: 3 m (9.8 ft)
- Length: 7 km (4.3 mi)
- Basin size: 29.38 km^{2} (11.34 sq mi)

Oshiwara River is a river in Mumbai, India. It begins in the Aarey Forest, cuts through the Goregaon hills, across the Aarey Forest before emptying into the Malad Creek. On the way it is joined by another creek near Swami Vivekanand Road, before picking up industrial effluents and sewage while crossing the Oshiwara industrial estates and slums of Andheri. Most of the call centres in Malad have been built on reclaimed ground at the mouth of the river. In 2025, the Brihanmumbai Municipal Corporation (BMC) has approved the revised design for a bridge proposed over the Oshiwara River in Goregaon. Further, as a result of a structural audit of another bridge (New Link Road) over the river by the BMC in 2022, it was noted that the 40-year old bridge was weak and potentially dangerous, hence, the BMC has decided to demolish and rebuild the vehicular bridge, as per a report.

== Clean up ==
After the 2005 Maharashtra floods in Mumbai, efforts are on to widen and clean up the river. Some proposals include converting it into a waterway for barges, setting up small farms on its banks and introduce biogas plants to convert waste into energy and use its slurry for manure for agriculture purpose.

== See also ==
- List of rivers of India
- Rivers of India
- Seven Islands of Bombay
