= Malad Creek =

Creek in Mumbai, India

Coordinates: 19°08′N 72°48′E

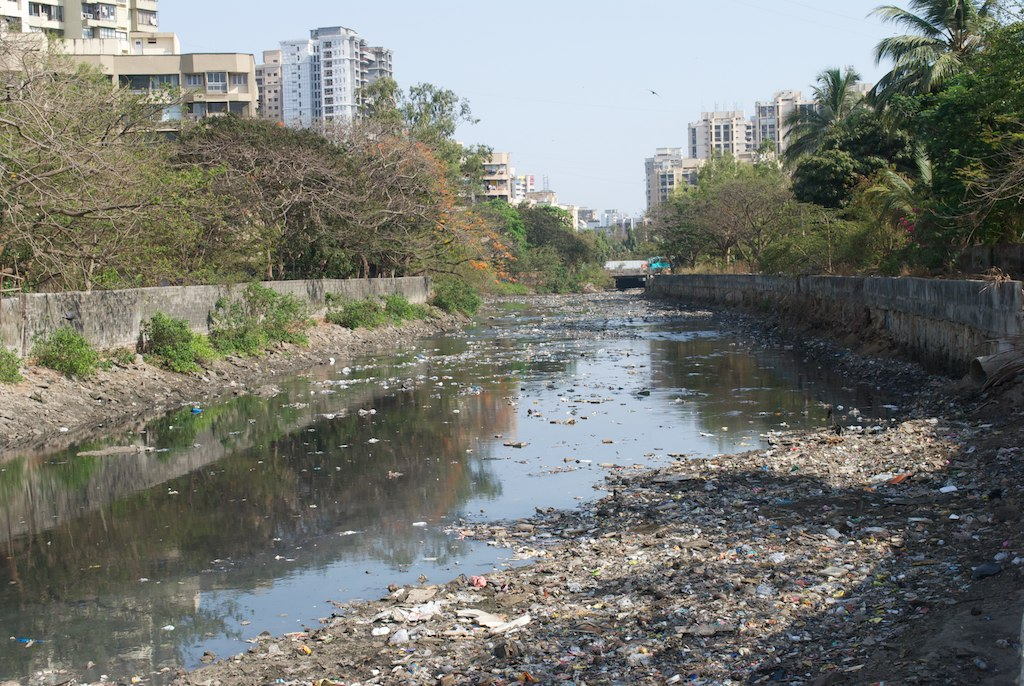
Pollution in Malad Creek

Malad Creek or Marve Creek is a creek in north-west Mumbai. Located west of Malad, the Oshiwara River drains into it. To the west is Madh Island, and to the east lies Versova. Earlier it was surrounded by a 1,000-acre (4.0 km^{2}) area of mangroves. But now this area has shrunk to 400 acres (1.6 km^{2}) as real estate prices in Malad went up. Malad creek is 5 km in length.

The Malad sewage treatment plant gives preliminary treatment of waste before discharging it directly into the creek, and in 2017 was considered "perhaps the worst" polluting plant in the city.
