= Oshiwara =

- Suburb
- Location within Mumbai
- Country: India
- State: Maharashtra
- District: Mumbai Suburban
- City: Mumbai

Government
  - Type: Municipal Corporation
  - Body: Brihanmumbai Municipal Corporation (MCGM)

Languages
  - Official: Marathi
- Time zone: UTC+5:30 (IST)
- PIN: 400102
- Area code: 022
- Civic agency: BMC

Oshiwara is a neighbourhood in northern Mumbai, Maharashtra, India, near Lokhandwala Complex. Its name was derived from the Oshiwara River. Located between the western sides of Goregaon and Jogeshwari, it has many industrial estates. A railway station was built at Oshiwara, called Ram Mandir, for the Western Line of Mumbai Suburban Railway, providing service to the extended Andheri and Lokhandwala areas of the western suburbs. Oshiwara is known for its antique and second-hand furniture market, as well as its food corners.

Brihanmumbai Electricity Supply and Transport operates a bus depot at Oshiwara.
