= Borivali railway station =

Mumbai Suburban Railway Station

Borivali

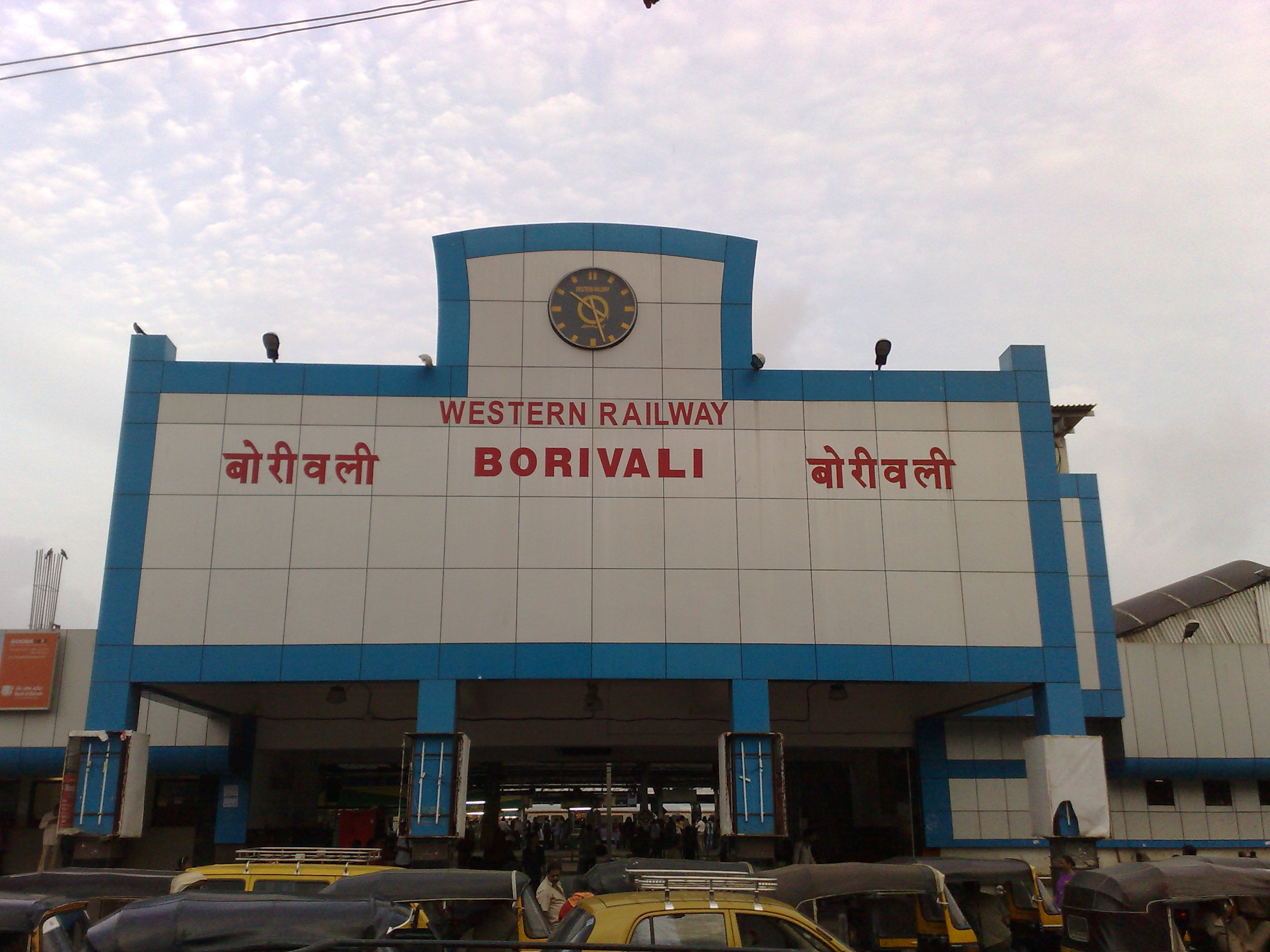

General information
- Location: Borivali
- Coordinates: 19.229427°N 72.856994°E
- System: Mumbai Suburban Railway station
- Owner: Ministry of Railways, Indian Railways
- Line: Western Line
- Platforms: 10
- Tracks: 9

Construction
- Structure type: Standard on-ground station
- Platform levels: 19.0 metres (62.3 ft)

Other information
- Status: Active
- Station code: BO (suburban); BVI (mainline)
- Fare zone: Western Railway zone

History
- Opened: 1864/65
- Former names: Berewlee/Dysur

Passengers
- 2012-13: 3,92,417 (daily)

Services
Preceding station	Mumbai Suburban Railway	Following station
Kandivli towards Churchgate	Western line	Dahisar towards Dahanu Road
Route map
Location
- Location within Mumbai

Borivali (station code: BO (suburban)/BVI (mainline)) is a railway station on the Western line of the Mumbai Suburban Railway network and an outbound station. It serves the suburban area of Borivali.

The Borivali Railway Station is a terminus for all slow, semi-fast, and fast trains on the Mumbai Suburban Railway system. It also serves as the final city-limit stop for all mail and express trains on the Western Railway before leaving Mumbai. As of October 2022, the plans to extend the Harbour Line to Borivali are in full steam, with the survey for land acquisition being completed.

Borivali is used by almost 2.87 lakh (287,000) passengers every day and is the busiest station on the western suburban line of Mumbai.

== History ==
Borivali is mentioned as a station as early as February 1865. Then, it was known as 'Berewla'/'Berewlee, or "Dysur". By 1888, there was one dedicated Borivli Local each way, and by the year 1900, there were 7 Borivli locals each way, daily.

The Station was remodeled in 1913, along with Virar as the population had increased considerably. The remodeling diagrams of the station were published in a BB&CI Magazine dated Dec 1923.

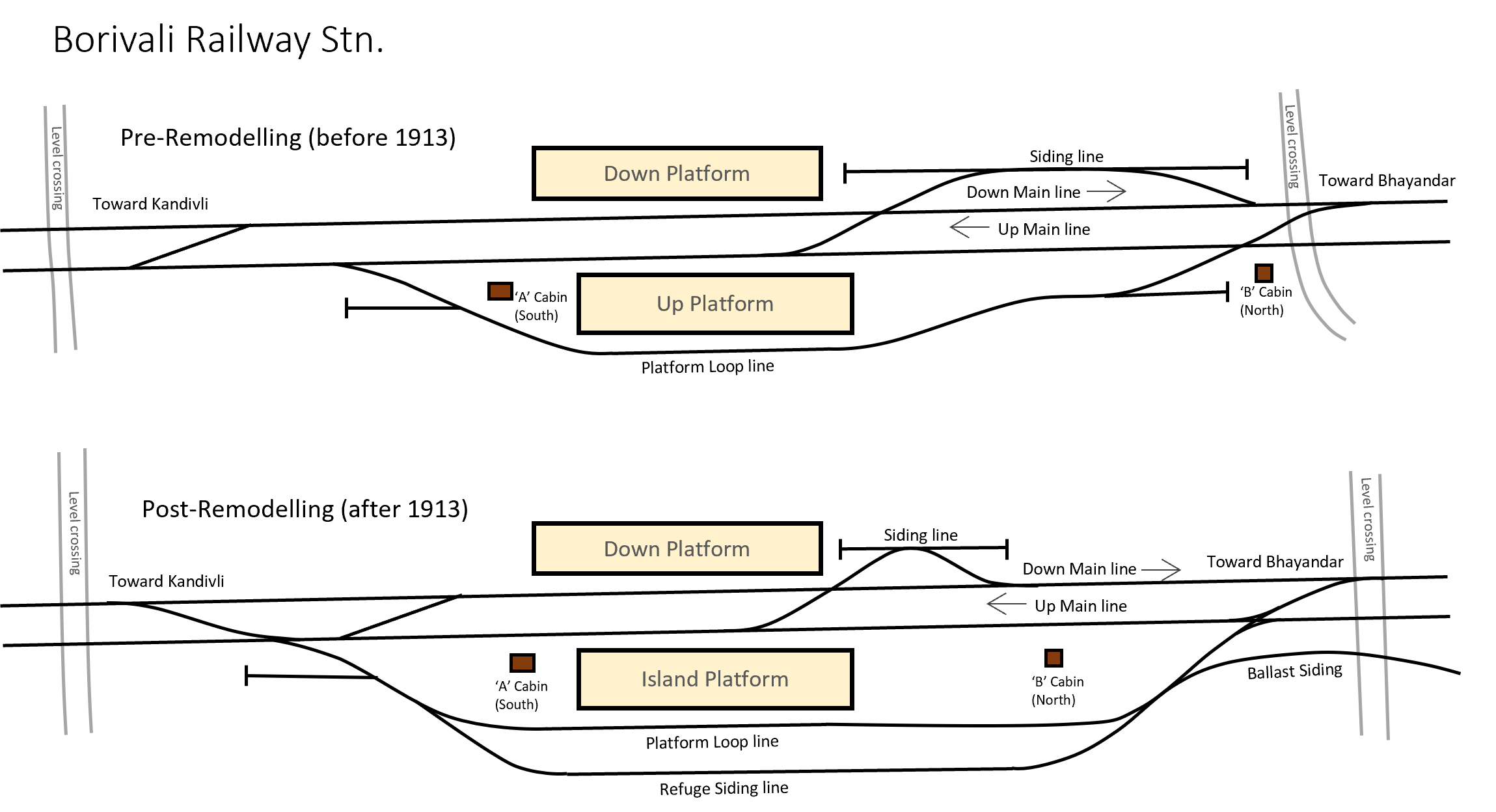
Before and after diagrams of Borivali railway station, showing changes in layout after the remodeling scheme of 1913

The Suburban section from Colaba to Borivali was electrified in the 1920s. The section was inaugurated on 5 January 1928, by Governor of Bombay, Sir Leslie Wilson at a ceremony at Mahalaxmi, in presence of 700 invitees. The governor travelled as a passenger upto Andheri station. The Borivali-Viraur section could not be electrified simultaneously, due to trade expressions, and a lack of funding.

The section from Borivali to Viraur was underwent signal modernisation around 1936. In August of the same year, the entire 16 mile (25.75 km) section between these two stations was electrified.

On 4 February 2009, a rail roko happened at Borivali station, with many trains being halted or cancelled for several hours. The reason for this was because commuters were complaining about the lack of suburban trains starting from Borivali, with more trains originating from Virar instead.

== Platforms ==
For the convenience of the passengers, Western Railway decided to change the platform numbers of Borivali station. The platforms have now been numbered from west to east, to maintain uniformity. Changes will be effective from 4 June 2017.

== Gallery ==
Train drawing water at Borivali station, c.1923

Borivali station: Northward View from Fob

Borivali station: Eastward view of Platform sheds

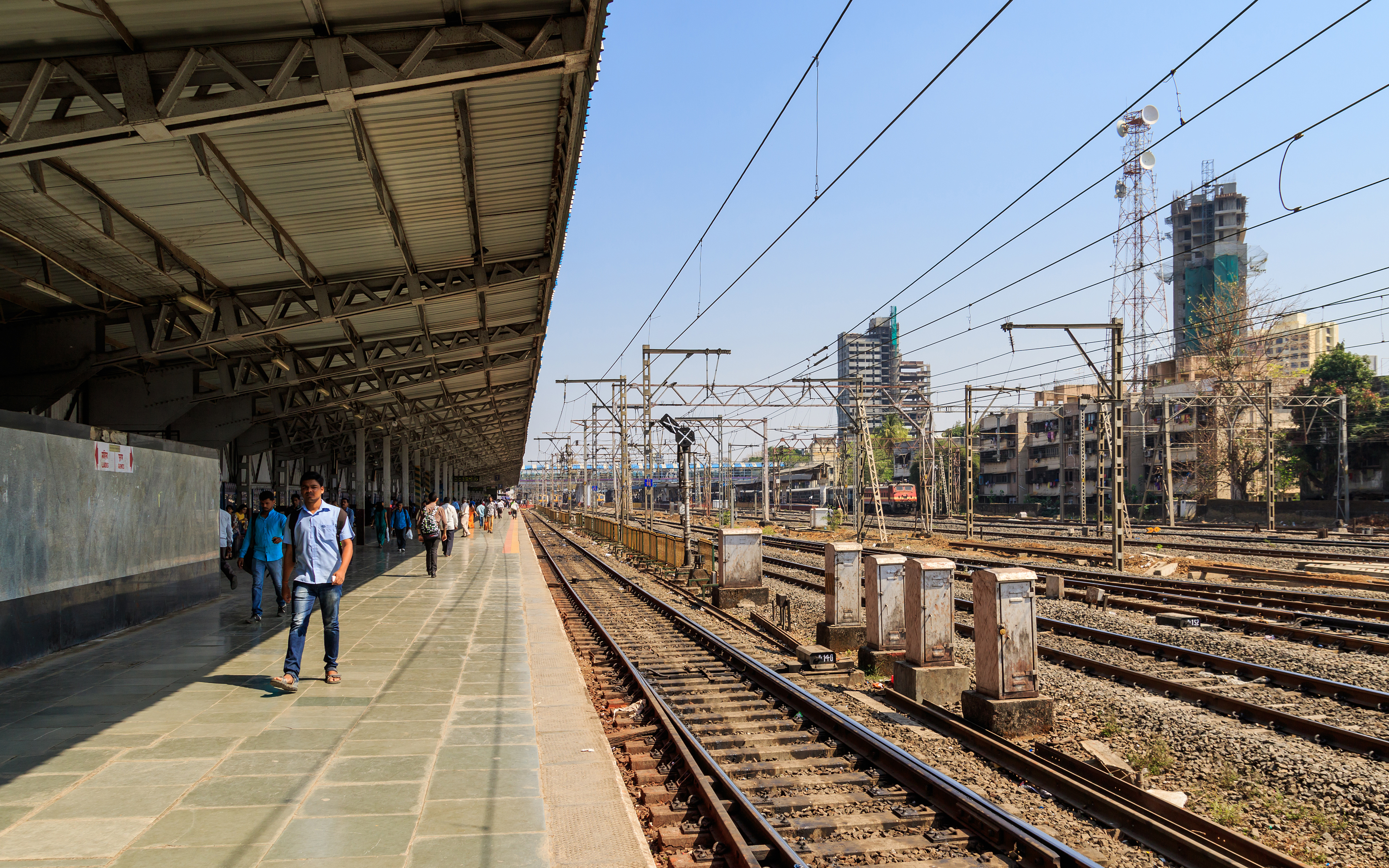
Terminal platform

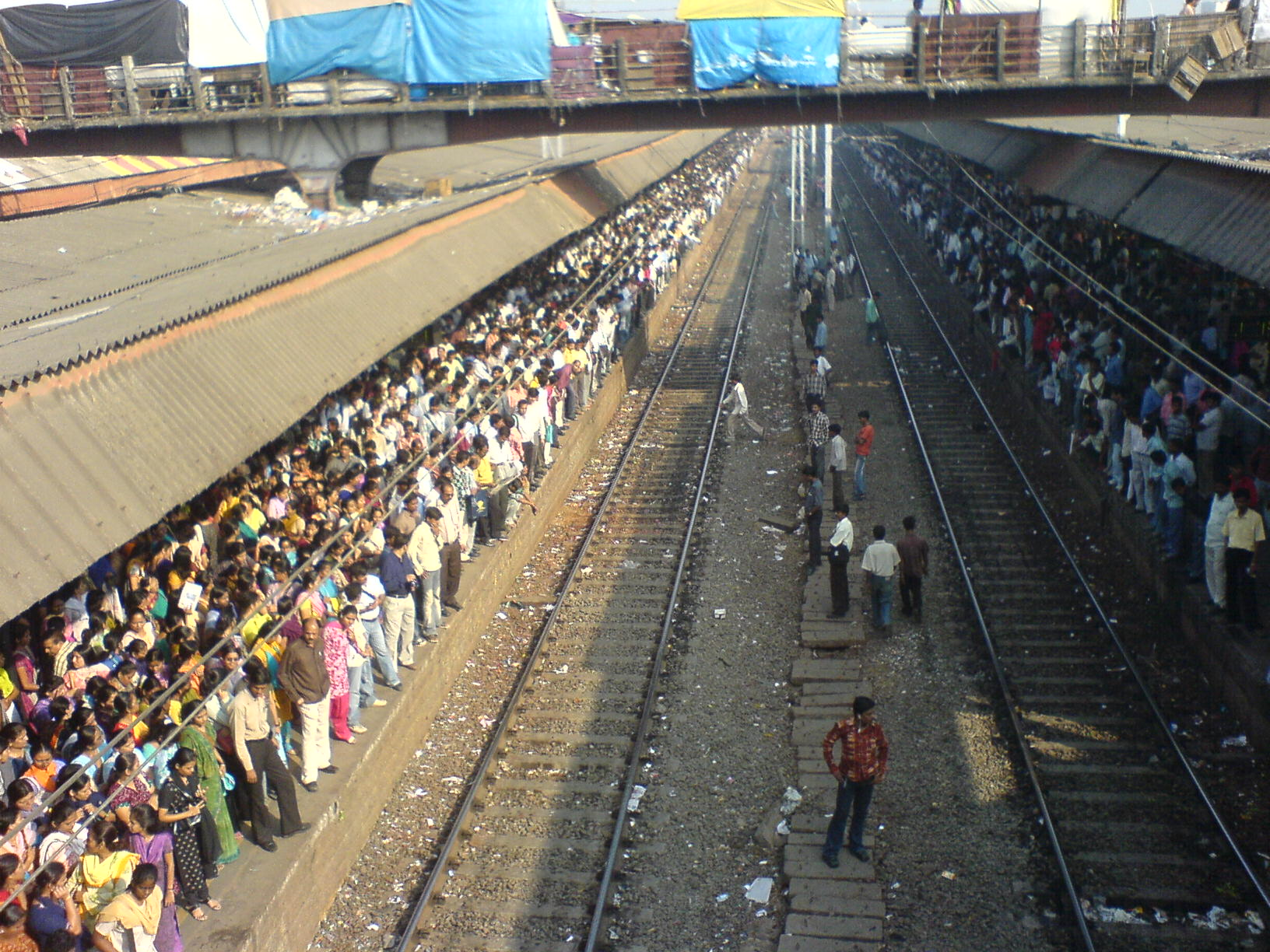
Borivali station during peak hours

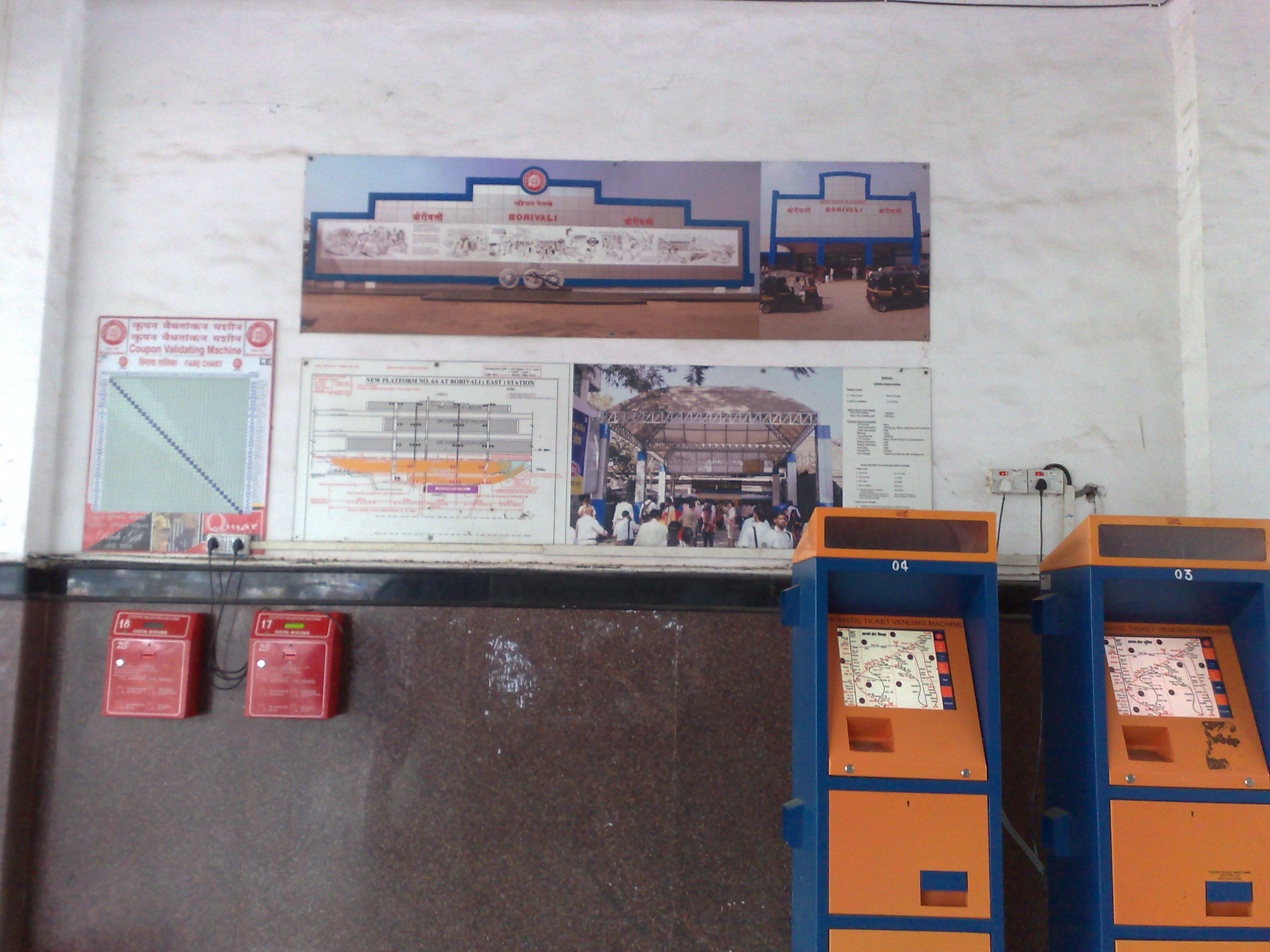
Borivali railway station - CVM & ATV

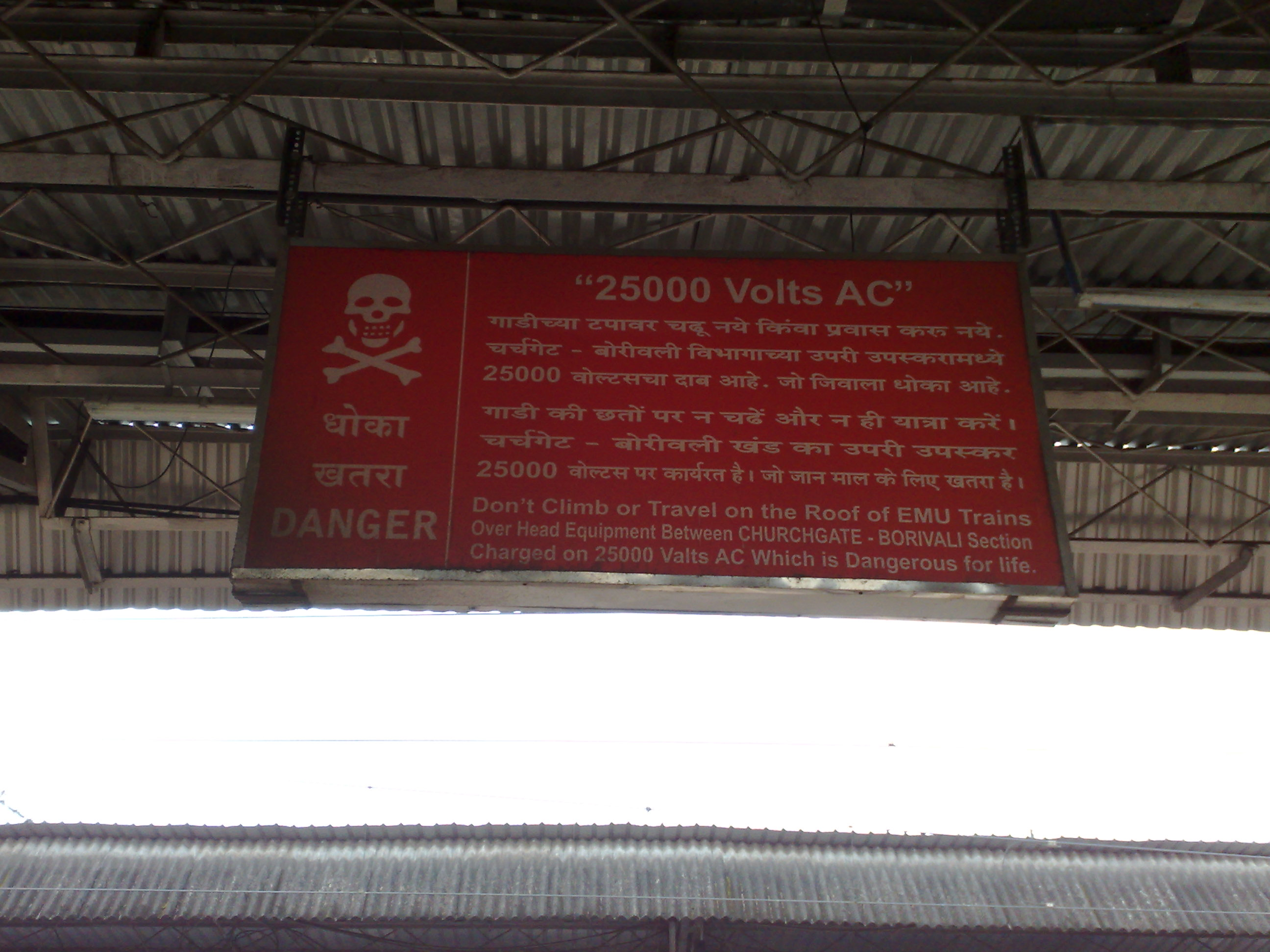
Borivali railway station - Warning

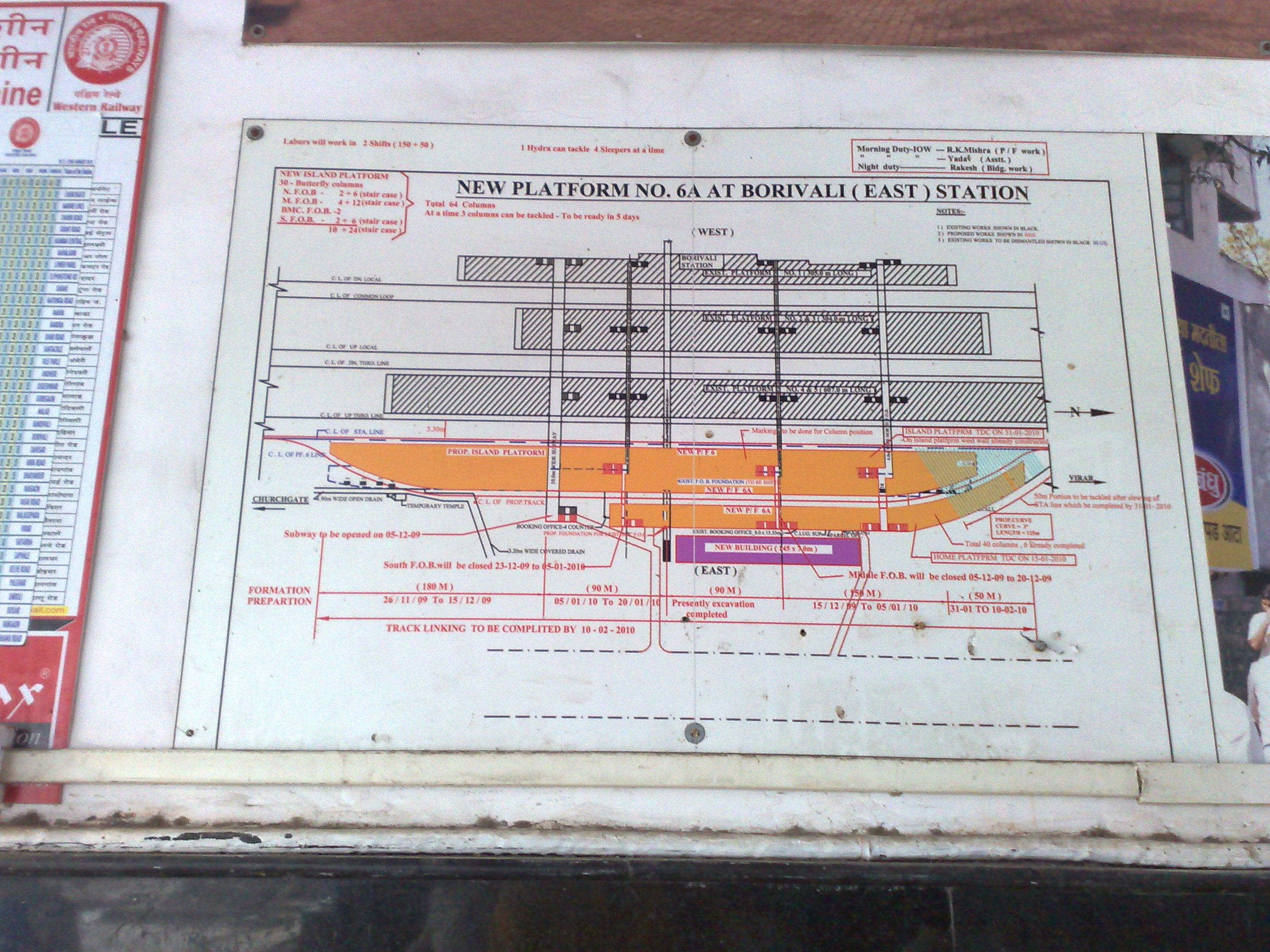
Borivali station's recent Remodelling layout

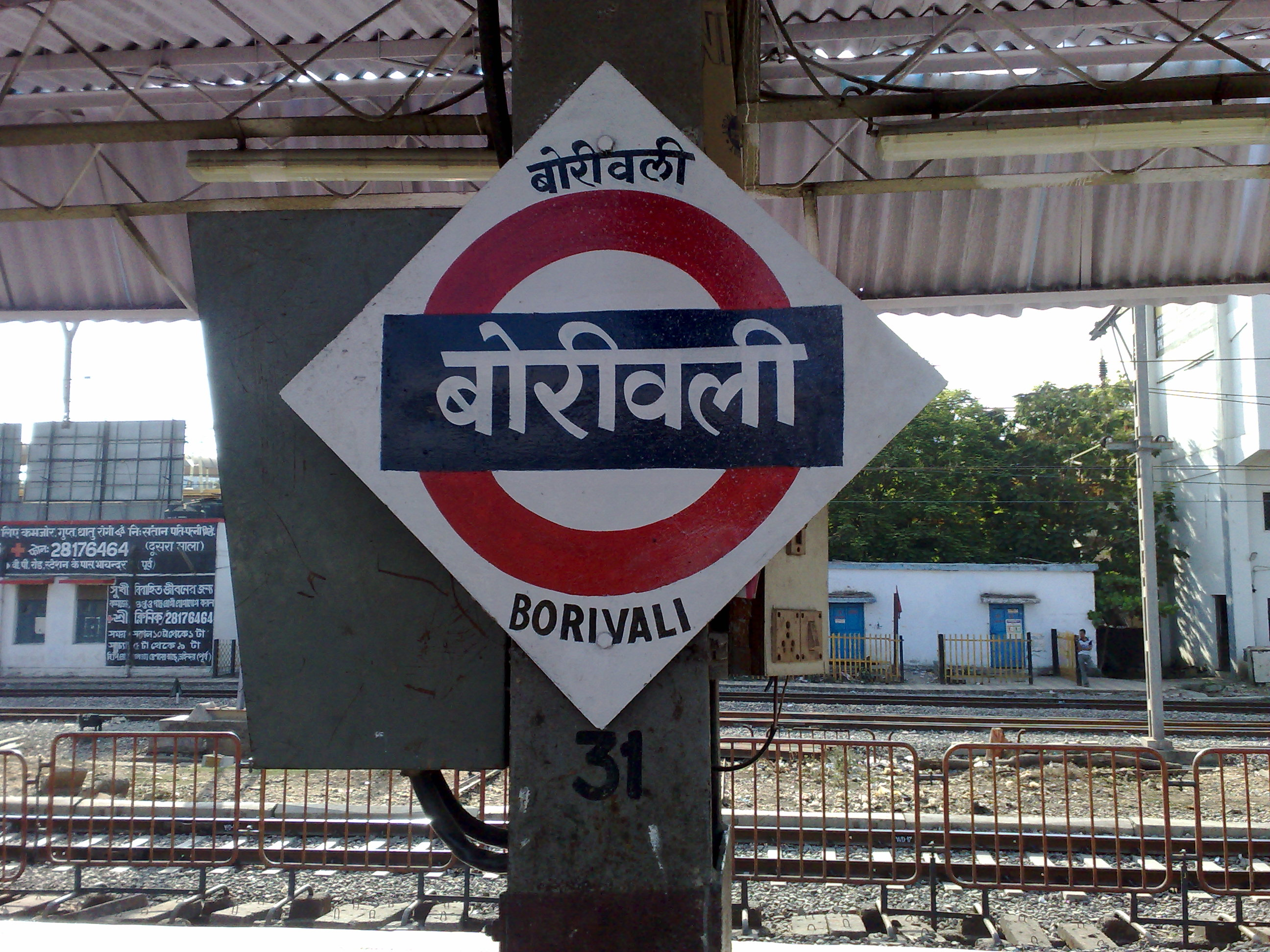
Borivali Platform Board

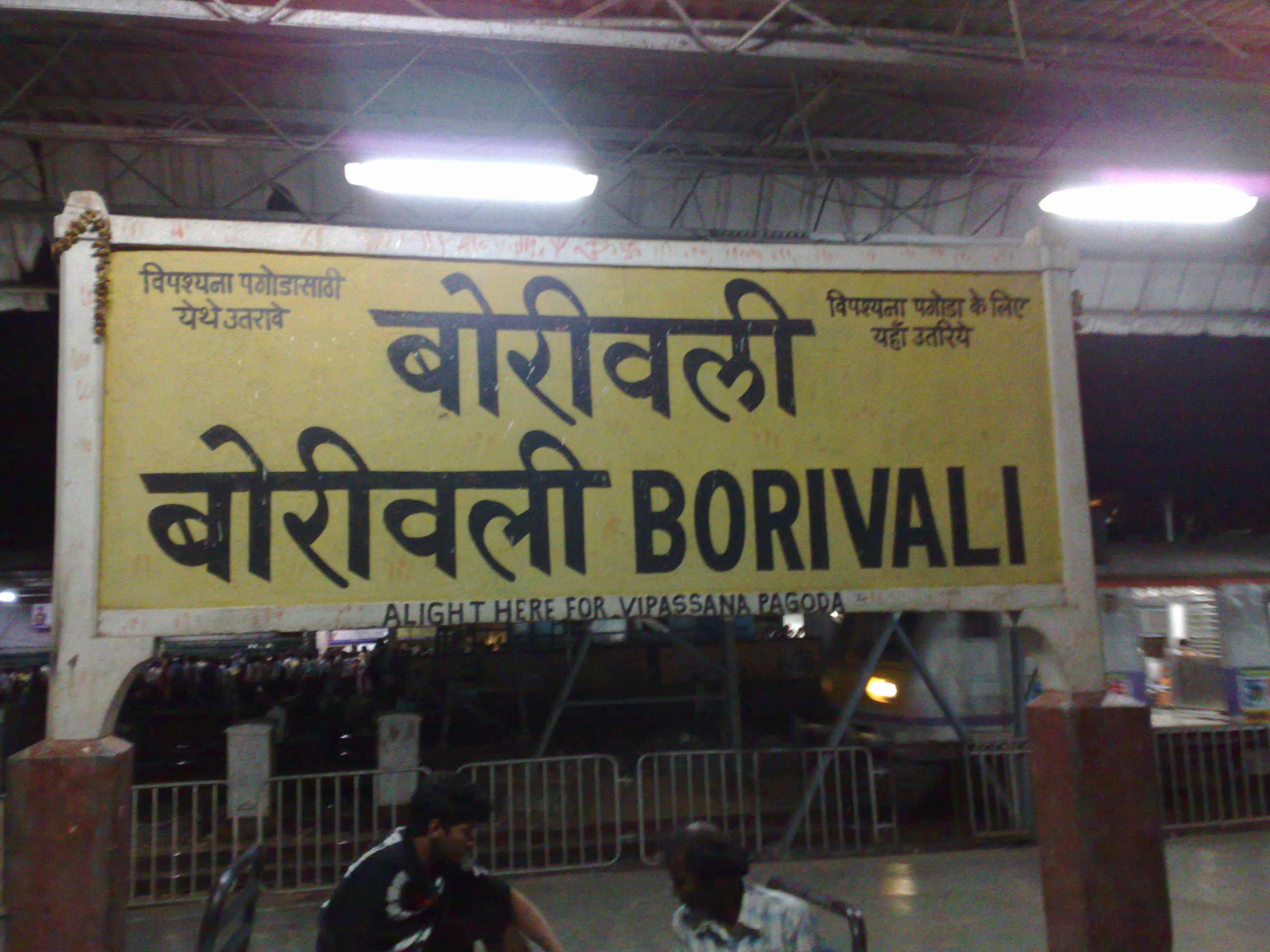
Borivali Station Board
