= Western railway elevated corridor =

Proposed Raised Railway in Mumbai

Western Railway Elevated Corridor

Overview
- Status: Rejected due to financial viability
- Owner: Indian Railways
- Locale: Mumbai, Maharashtra; Mira-Bhayandar, Maharashtra; Vasai-Virar, Maharashtra
- Termini: Oval Maidan; Virar
- Stations: 26

Service
- Type: Rapid transit
- System: Mumbai Suburban Railway
- Operator: Western Railway (WR)
- Daily ridership: 1.7 million (2019-20 estimate)

Technical
- Line length: 63.27 km (39.31 mi)
- Number of tracks: 2
- Character: Elevated, underground and at grade
- Track gauge: 5 ft 6 in (1,676 mm)
- Operating speed: 100 km/h

The Western Railway Elevated Corridor, also known as the Oval Maidan-Virar elevated corridor, was a proposed rapid transit corridor that would have run along the same alignment as the Western Line of the Mumbai Suburban Railway, and link Oval Maidan with Virar.

== History ==
The Western railway elevated corridor was first proposed in the 2007 Railway Budget presented by then Railway Minister Laloo Prasad Yadav. The technical feasibility report for the project was prepared by Rail India Technical and Economic Service (RITES) and the French firm Systra. On 23 August 2012, Western Railway (WR) held a planning meeting with potentially interested parties at Churchgate station. The meeting included 20 companies including Reliance infrastructure, Gammon, IL&FS, Essar and GMR. According to Sharat Chandrayan, CPRO of WR, "The road-show was mainly to explain requirements for the project to prospective bidders and to understand their suggestions before bidding takes place". A delay occurred in signing of the State Support Agreement (SSA) between WR and the Government of Maharashtra due to differences of opinion between the State Government, the Planning Commission and the railways on issues related to FSI, land acquisition, shifting of underground utilities and commercial use of land. The SSA is the state's commitment to help Railways in land acquisition, shifting utility services on time and attaining more FSI to help developers generate funds. WR demanded an FSI of five for 13 land parcels across the city, in order to optimise commercial development of its existing plots as major source of funds for the project. However, the state government expressed reservations in granting an FSI up to four, saying that it would permit need-based FSI only. The project is planned to be implemented as a joint public-private partnership (PPP) project of the railways, the state government and private organisation on Design, Build, Finance, Operate and Transfer (DBFOT) basis.

The project received in-principle approval from Maharashtra government on 9 April 2013. The Maharashtra government sought central funding for the Mumbai Elevated Rail Corridor Project, which is aimed to revolutionise suburban commuting in the city. In August 2013, the railway ministry issued new Request For Qualification (RFQ) documents for the project, about a week after withdrawing previously issued RFQ documents. The ministry had withdrawn the documents after realizing that the dispute between the state government and the railways over the signing of the SSA was frightening off potential bidders. Six infrastructure firms – Reliance, Larsen and Toubro, GMR, Gammon, ILFS and CAF Spain – had bought the earlier RFQ document at a cost of ₹1 million (US$16,000) each. The railway ministry announced on 17 September 2013, that the deadline for expressing interest had been extended to 29 November from 20 October. "Unless the agreement with the state government is signed it will be difficult for the project to take off", he said.

The state government clarified it would not permit a higher FSI for the project, and lobbied for its own Mumbai Metro project. The state government opposes the elevated rail corridor project, arguing that the proposed Line 3 of the Mumbai Metro Metro project between Colaba and SEEPZ follows the same route. Following the November meeting, WR commissioned RITES to conduct a study on passenger volume projections if the route were shortened. The state government had suggested that the corridor be terminated at Bandra. The study found that terminating the corridor at Bandra would result in 40% reduction in passenger volume, which would make the project financially unviable.

The PMO ordered a fresh traffic study for the elevated corridor in November 2013. In an infrastructure review meeting chaired by Prime Minister Manmohan Singh in November 2013, Maharashtra Chief Minister Prithviraj Chavan stated that there should be a rethink on the project as the proposed Mumbai Metro would partially be on the same alignment as the elevated corridor. The feasibility study conducted by the Indian Railways a couple of years prior had found that the elevated corridor would have a ridership of 1.1 million in the first year of its operations. The Railways commissioned Rail India Technical and Economic Service (RITES), its engineering arm, to conduct a fresh study as instructed by the PMO. Railways also postponed the last date for RFQ to 31 January 2013. According to a railway board official, the contract for the corridor will be awarded by May 2014, if the Maharashtra government agrees to sign the state support agreement (SSA), after the new report. The earlier date for awarding the contract, fixed by the PMO, was 31 January 2014. Eight infrastructure companies – Reliance Infrastructure, Gammon India, Larsen and Toubro (L&T), Infrastructure Leasing and Financial Services Ltd (IL&FS), GMR Infrastructure Ltd, Construcciones y Auxiliar de Ferrocarriles (CAF), Siemens AG and Tata Realty and Infrastructure have applied for the project. During the meeting, the state government clarified it would not permit a higher FSI for the project, and lobbied for its own Mumbai Metro project. The state government opposes the elevated rail corridor project, arguing that the proposed Line 3 of the Mumbai Metro Metro project between Colaba and SEEPZ partially traverses an alignment similar to the elevated corridor. Following the November meeting, WR commissioned RITES to conduct a study on passenger volume projections if the elevated corridor was allowed to operate only between Virar and Bandra. The state government had suggested that the corridor be terminated at Bandra, instead of Oval Maidan, because the proposed Line 3 of the Mumbai Metro would partially run on the same alignment as the elevated rail corridor. The study found that terminating the corridor at Bandra would result in an estimated loss in ridership of 40%, which would make the project financially unviable.

The 2014 Rail Budget presented by railway minister Mallikarjun Kharge did not mention the elevated corridor, drawing criticism from railway officials and commuters who had been following the project. In April 2014, the Railway Board instructed WR to halt all work they had undertaken with regards to the project. Subodh Jain, member (engineering) of the Railway Board, stated, "The Oval Maidan-Virar elevated corridor has gone cold due to lack of interest by the state government." The Ministry of Railways shelved the project stating that until the government shows interest in the project, there was no need to carry out any work. Following a change at the centre and a new Railway Minister, after the 2014 general elections, there was renewed interest in the project. Chairman of Railway Board Arunendra Kumar and the Chief Secretary of Maharashtra J. Saharia met on 14 June 2014 to discuss the future of the project. On 8 January 2015, Railway Minister Suresh Prabhu announced that the elevated corridor and the CST-Panvel corridor would be implemented. According to a new proposal, a 6-lane road will be constructed on the same pier as the elevated rail corridors.

In March 2015, the Railways suggested terminating the south-end of the line at Andheri, in response to the Maharashtra Government's concern that extending the line to Oval Maidan or Churchgate would be complicated. Due to space constraints in South Mumbai, the southern section of the line was planned to be underground from Oval Maidan to Mahalaxmi. However, the proposed Line 3 of the Mumbai Metro would pass through the same area, requiring the construction of a tunnel at greater depth for the WR corridor. The presence of several listed heritage buildings in the area also made the task more difficult. On 5 May 2015, DNA reported that an announcement to scrap the project was expected to come soon. The paper quoted a senior railway official as stating that the project "still remained in limbo as the state and the railways couldn't sign the State Support Agreement since May 2012."

Railway Minister Suresh Prabhu announced on 25 February 2016, while presenting the Railway Budget, that the elevated corridor project would be implemented. In March 2016, Mumbai Railway Vikas Corporation (MRVC) announced that it had sent the Maharashtra government a modified state support agreement (SSA) for an elevated corridor from Andheri to Virar. The SSA had been the primary cause of the delay under the previous NCP-Congress government, who objected to clauses in the agreement that placed responsibilities for rehabilitation and shifting of underground utilities on state government agencies. The MVRC estimates that the Andheri-Virar corridor can be built at an estimated cost of ₹10,000 crore (US$1.0 billion) on PPP model.

In August 2016, Chief Minister Fadnavis announced that the state government had approved the SSA. He also stated that the project had received in-principle clearance from the NITI Aayog. According to railway officials, tenders for work on the project may only be floated by the end of 2017. In December 2017, the Union Railway Minister Piyush Goyal stated that the project would not be implemented because it was financially unviable.

== Route ==
It will consist of a 63.27 km two-track elevated corridor running above the existing Western Line, occasionally going underground and at ground level. The elevated sections will be 15 to 20 m above the ground, and higher at Andheri in order to clear the new Mumbai Metro station. The corridor was initially proposed to go underground for 8.04 km from Oval Maidan to Mahalaxmi. Between Mahalaxmi and Borivali, the line will be elevated for 25.22 km and then at grade for 2.20 km. In the final stretch, between Borivali and Virar, 17.50 km would be elevated and 10.31 km would be at grade. Approximately, 42.72 km of the corridor was to be elevated, 8.04 km would be underground and the remaining 12.52 km at grade.

Railway officials announced on 29 September 2012 that a decision had been taken to alter the earlier alignment and go underground for an additional 8.5 km stretch between Bandra and Jogeshwari to avoid having to buy and remove over 100 buildings extant on the planned route. This will increase the project cost by ₹12 billion (US$120 million). According to Mahesh Kumar, general manager of WR, the realignment would save money because he estimates that land acquisition and rehabilitation along the stretch would cost over ₹20 billion (US$210 million). As a result of the changes, 16.6 km of the corridor will now be underground, 10 km will run at grade alongside existing tracks and 36.4 km will be elevated. The underground sections include the 8.04 km stretch between Oval Maidan and Mahalaxmi, and the 8.56 km stretch between Bandra and Jogeshwari that was proposed in the amended plans. The at grade section, roughly lying between north Santacruz and north Vile Parle, is because of restrictions in height placed by the Airports Authority of India. The stretches between Dahisar-Mira Road, Bhayander-Vasai and at Virar will also be at grade. The remaining stretches will be elevated.

Initially, 26 stations were proposed. However, WR may cancel 3 or 4 stations to reduce cost and land acquisition. Stations that are situated close together or estimated to have low passenger traffic may be dropped from the plan. Matunga Road, Mahim and Naigaon stations have been proposed to be cancelled.

The elevated corridor is expected to take 30% of the load off existing lines. Western Railway (WR) intends to fund the project by commercially developing 130,000 square metres of land in 8 locations, of which five plots are Mumbai Central, Bandra, Andheri, Mahalaxmi and Borivali.

The Virar maintenance depot was planned to require 65 hectares of land, but the new one will require 40.8 hectares of land, due to a decision by WR to reduce the proposed number of coaches on a train from the earlier 15 to 8. Oval Maidan station will be integrated with Hutatma Chowk station on the proposed Colaba-Bandra line of the Mumbai Metro.

== Stations ==
The line will have 26 stations - 5 underground, 19 elevated and 2 at grade.

#	Station name	Layout
1	Oval Maidan	Underground
2	Churchgate	Underground
3	Grant Road	Underground
4	Mumbai Central	Underground
5	Mahalaxmi	Underground
6	Lower Parel	Elevated
7	Prabhadevi	Elevated
8	Dadar	Elevated
9	Matunga Road	Elevated
10	Mahim Junction	Elevated
11	Bandra	Elevated
12	Santacruz	Elevated
13	Vile Parle	Elevated
14	Andheri	Elevated
15	Jogeshwari	Elevated
16	Goregaon	Elevated
17	Malad	Elevated
18	Kandivli	Elevated
19	Borivali	Elevated
20	Dahisar	Elevated
21	Mira Road	At grade
22	Bhayandar	Elevated
23	Naigaon	At grade
24	Vasai Road	At grade
25	Nallasopara	Elevated
26	Virar	At grade

== Extension ==
Indian Railways plans to extend the corridor from Oval Maidan to either Mantralaya or Nariman Point.

== Cost ==
The project is estimated to cost ₹200 billion (US$2.1 billion) and will be implemented through a public-private partnership (PPP) mode on Design, Build, Finance, Operate and Transfer (DBFOT) basis by a private entity. The Central Government will provide 20% of the project cost as viability gap funding.

== Infrastructure ==
The rolling stock proposed will consist of 3,660-mm wide air-conditioned coaches. The corridor will have emergency sidings.

== Operations ==
- Services will run daily from 5am - 12am. Trains will be available every 90 seconds and will halt at each station for 30 seconds.
- Trains will be able to transport 90,000 passengers PHPDT (Peak Hour Peak Direction Traffic).
- Trains will have an optimum speed of 100 km/h.

== Criticism ==
1. The Elevated Railway Corridor has been surveyed to be aligned along the Western Side of the Western Railway Suburban Corridor (Not above the existing Railway Lines). This means that the Elevated Corridor would duplicate the Existing route and compete for the same passengers.

2. Western Railway has vacant land only between Borivali to Jogeshwari and Bandra to Dadar to lay the Pillars of the Elevated Corridor. This would mean that Western Railway has to acquire a large number of expensive Multi Storey properties between Jogeshwari and Bandra and Dadar to Churchgate to lay the Elevated Corridor.

3. There are many Road over Bridges on the Western Railway tracks between Churchgate and Virar which would have to be crossed over through Double Decker Bridges making them very expensive and complicated.

4. Oval Maidan is part of the Mumbai's Art Deco Heritage Precinct and it is highly unlikely that Mumbai Heritage Committee will allow a Railway Terminus on the Iconic Maidan.

5. Western Railway would have to construct this immensely expensive project and at the same time maintain the same fare structure as on the existing Sub-urban Railway network making this project highly financially unviable.

== Alternatives ==
Western Railway suburban corridor between Churchgate to Virar primarily consists of 4 Tracks, 2 slow lines and 2 Fast lines. The Fast lines are shared with outstation trains between Mumbai central and Virar. A 5th line exists between Mumbai Central to Mahim and Bandra Suburban Railway station (East) to Borivali via Bandra Terminus (BDTS), the former used by outstation trains between Mumbai Central to Dadar by trains originating and terminating at Mumbai Central whereas the latter is used by Trains originating and Terminating in Bandra Terminus.

By constructing a dedicated double line corridor between Mumbai Central and Virar, Western Railway can segregate the Suburban Corridor and outstation corridor and thereby increase the number of Local Trains on the Suburban corridor.

Moreover, Railway already owns land for laying a 6th line between Mumbai Central to Borivali and 2 lines between Borivali to Virar.

1. On the Western side of the existing tracks between Mumbai Central and Lower Parel.
2. On the Eastern side of the existing tracks between Lower Parel and Matunga Road.
3. On the Western side of the existing tracks between Matunga Road and Mahim.
4. Elevated viaduct above the WEH stretching from Sion-Mahim ROB to Khar Subway landing, via 5th line between Bandra(S) and Khar.
5. On the Eastern side of the existing tracks between Khar and Kandivali Carshed.
6. Clear bottlenecks at Vile parle Level crossing.
7. On the Western side of the existing tracks between Kandivali Carshed and Borivali.
8. Land for 5th and 6th line on the Western side of the existing tracks between Borivali and Virar.

Since Railways own most of the land for the 5th and 6th line, it would be more cost effective and financially viable vis-a-vis the Elevated Corridor.

== See also ==
- CST – Panvel Fast Corridor
- Western Line
- Mumbai Suburban Railway
- Mumbai Metro
