= Dahisar =

- Suburb
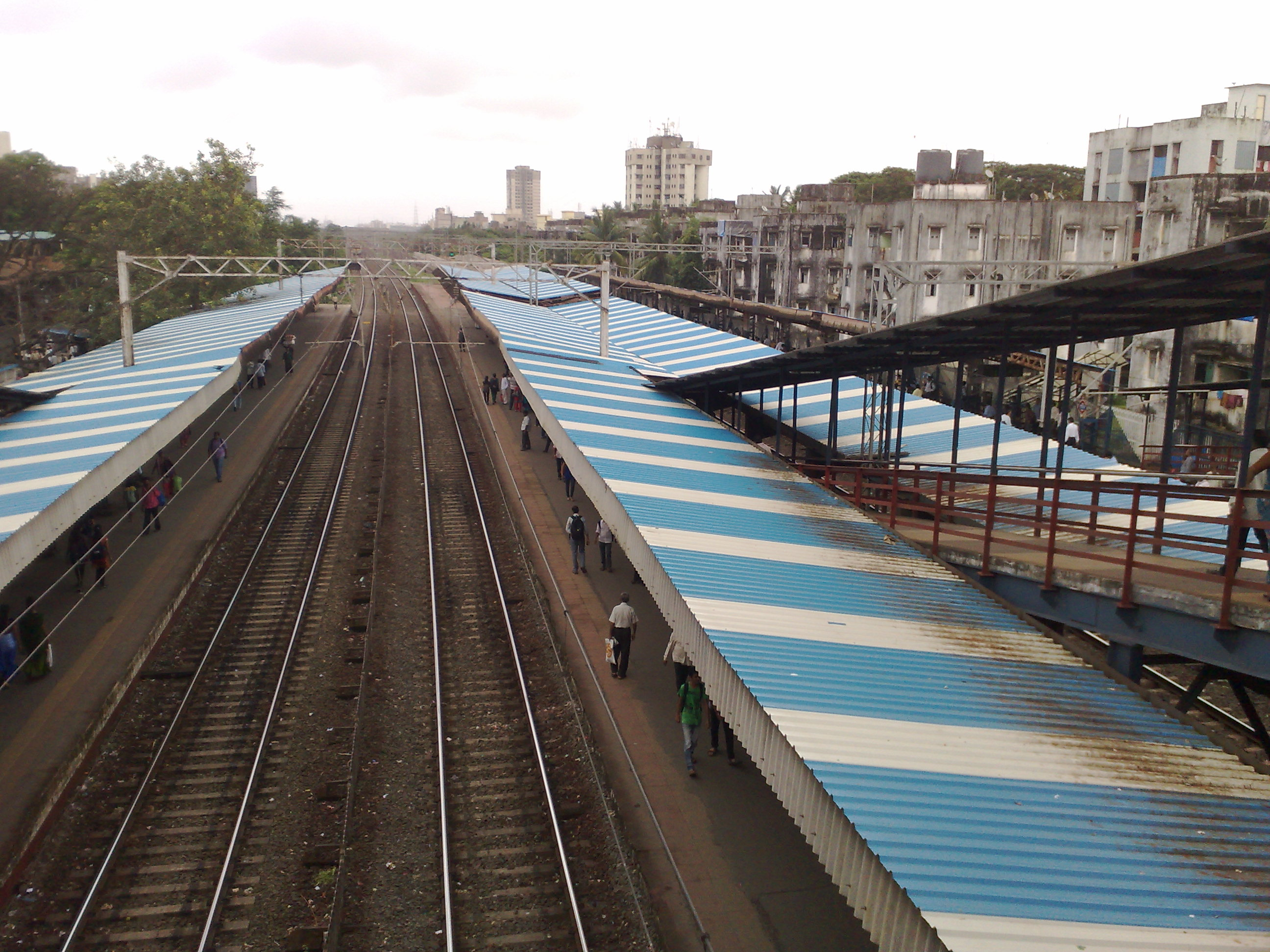
- Dahisar railway station
- Nickname: दहिसर / Dahisar
- Location within Mumbai
- Coordinates: 19.250069°N 72.859347°E
- Country: India
- State: Maharashtra
- District: Mumbai Suburban
- City: Mumbai

Government
  - Type: Municipal Corporation
  - Body: Brihanmumbai Municipal Corporation (MCGM)
- Time zone: UTC+5:30 (IST)
- PIN: 400 068 (East & West)
- Area code: 022
- Vehicle registration: MH 47

Dahisar (Marathi pronunciation: [d̪əɦisəɾ]) is the northernmost suburb (and railway station) of Mumbai, India. (Not to be confused with Dahisar Mori in Navi Mumbai). It is the last local railway station in Mumbai while travelling towards Dahanu Road and the first one while travelling towards Churchgate.

On the Mumbai Suburban Railway (which is part of the Indian Western Railway line), that runs from Churchgate to Virar, Dahisar is immediately north and next to the populous suburb of Borivali, which has a train station of the same name.

After Dahisar, when travelling northwards on the Churchgate - Virar Western Railway line the immediate next railway station or stop is Mira Road.

== History ==
Dahisar is mentioned as Dadhicheshwar in the 15th-17th century, Marathi-language text Mahikavatichi Bakhar; the name indicates the existence of a temple associated with Dadhichi there.

Dahisar was originally a part of the Thane District; it became a part of Mumbai in 1956.
