= Nallasopara railway station =

Railway Station in Maharashtra, India

Nalla Sopara

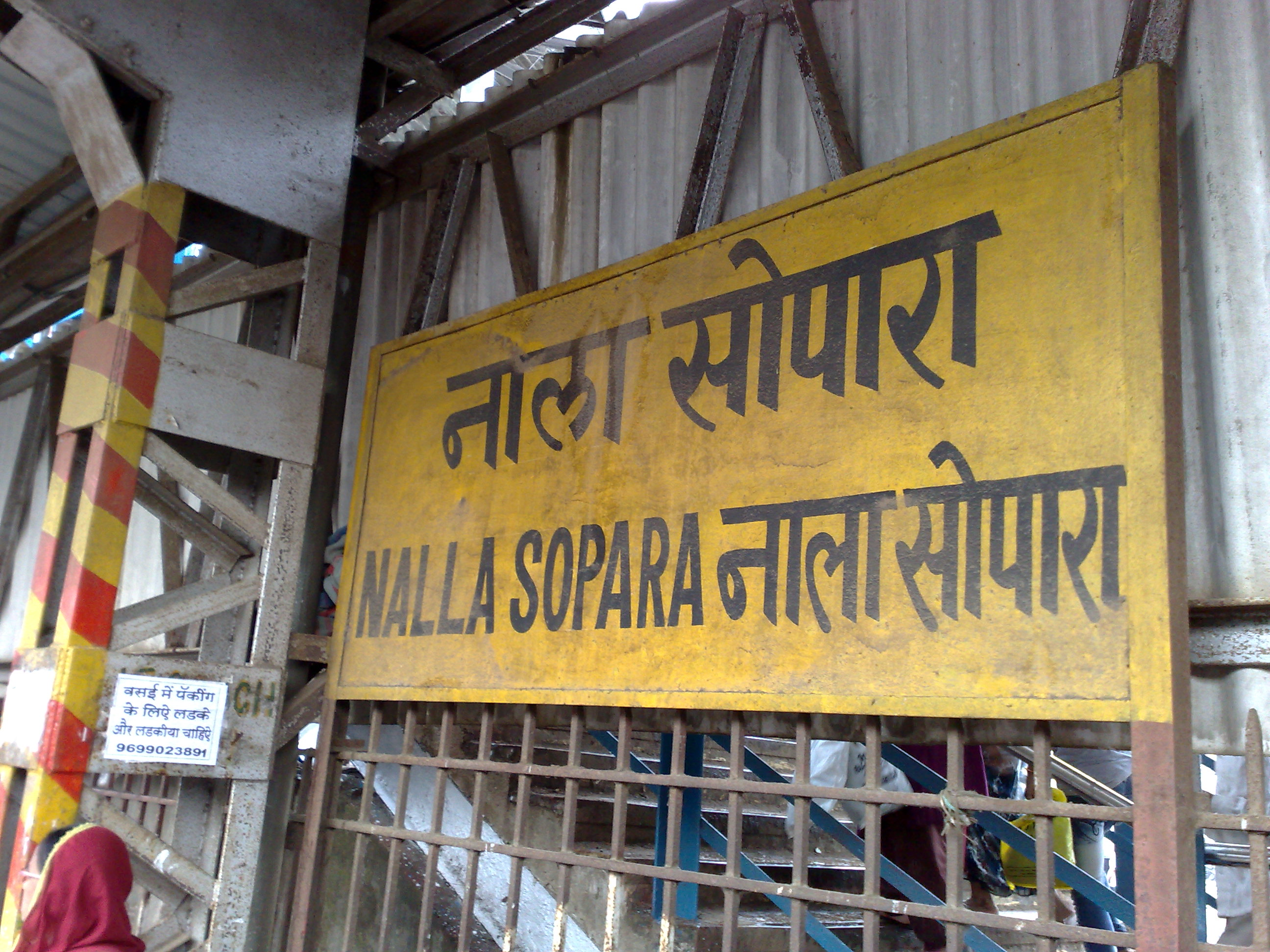

General information
- Location: Nallasopara
- Coordinates: 19.4154°N 72.8613°E
- System: Mumbai Suburban Railway station
- Owner: Ministry of Railways, Indian Railways
- Line: Western Line
- Platforms: 4
- Tracks: 4

Construction
- Structure type: Standard on-ground station

Other information
- Status: Active
- Station code: NSP
- Fare zone: Western Railway zone

History
- Opened: 1865

Passengers
- 2012-13: 3,25,787

Services
Preceding station	Mumbai Suburban Railway	Following station
Vasai Road towards Churchgate	Western line	Virar towards Dahanu Road
Route map
Location
- Location within Maharashtra

Nalla Sopara (station code NSP) is a railway station on the Western line of the Mumbai Suburban Railway network, serving the town of Nala Sopara, within the Mumbai Metropolitan Region.

== History ==
In 2011, Nalla Sopara alone recorded a 25% increase in first-class commuters from the previous year.

Western Railways widened the platforms at the station in 2012. It created more space on the narrow fast-train platform 4 at Nalla Sopara, as well as at Mira Road, which is linked to the skywalk. The project cost about ₹72 lacs and the construction was completed in July 2012.

The extra space on platforms helped the railway deal with increased number of passengers due to longer trains, wider bridges and new skywalks. The new bridge was built to provide passengers with another means of walking from platform to platform.

== Gallery ==
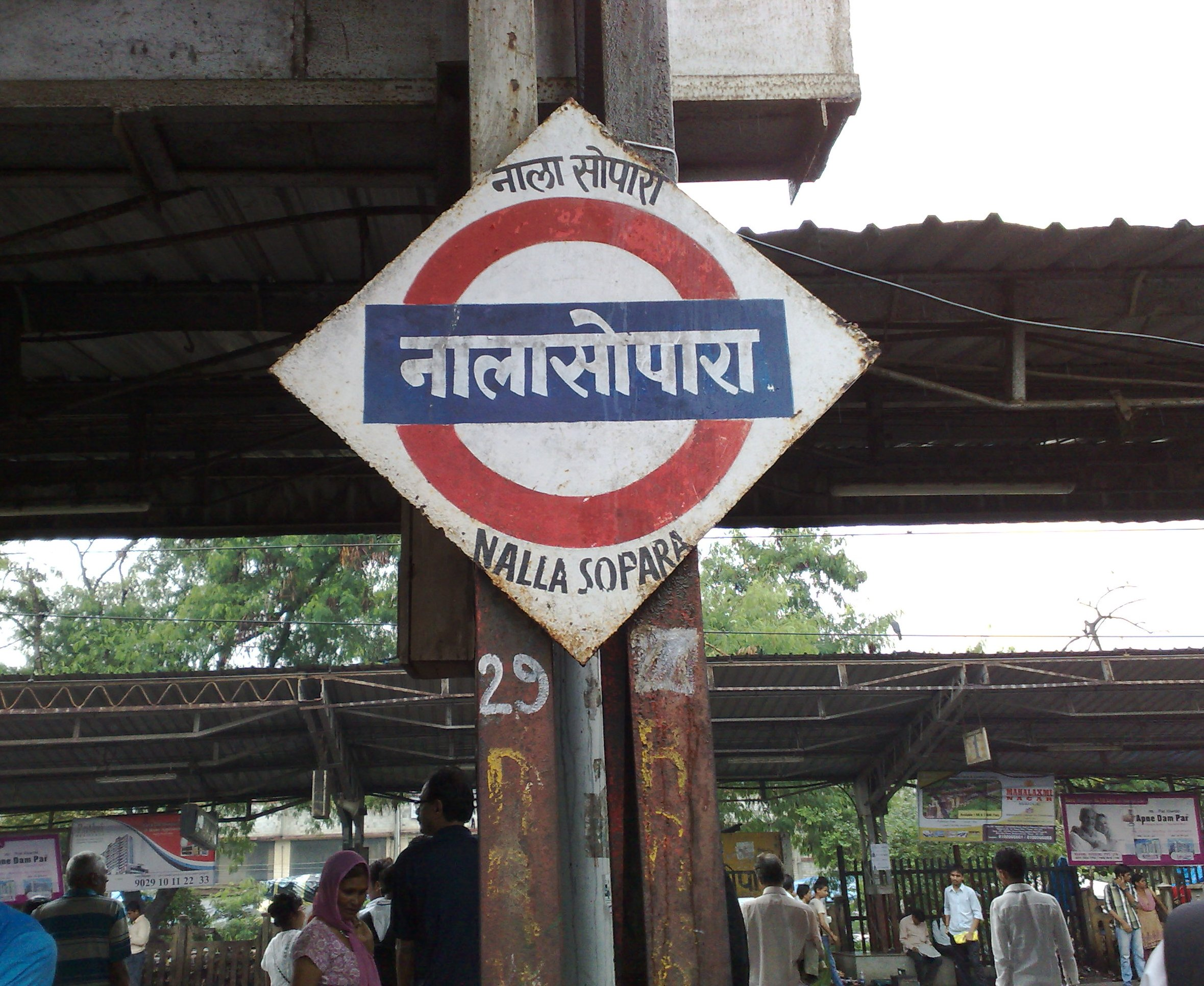
Nalla Sopara platformboard

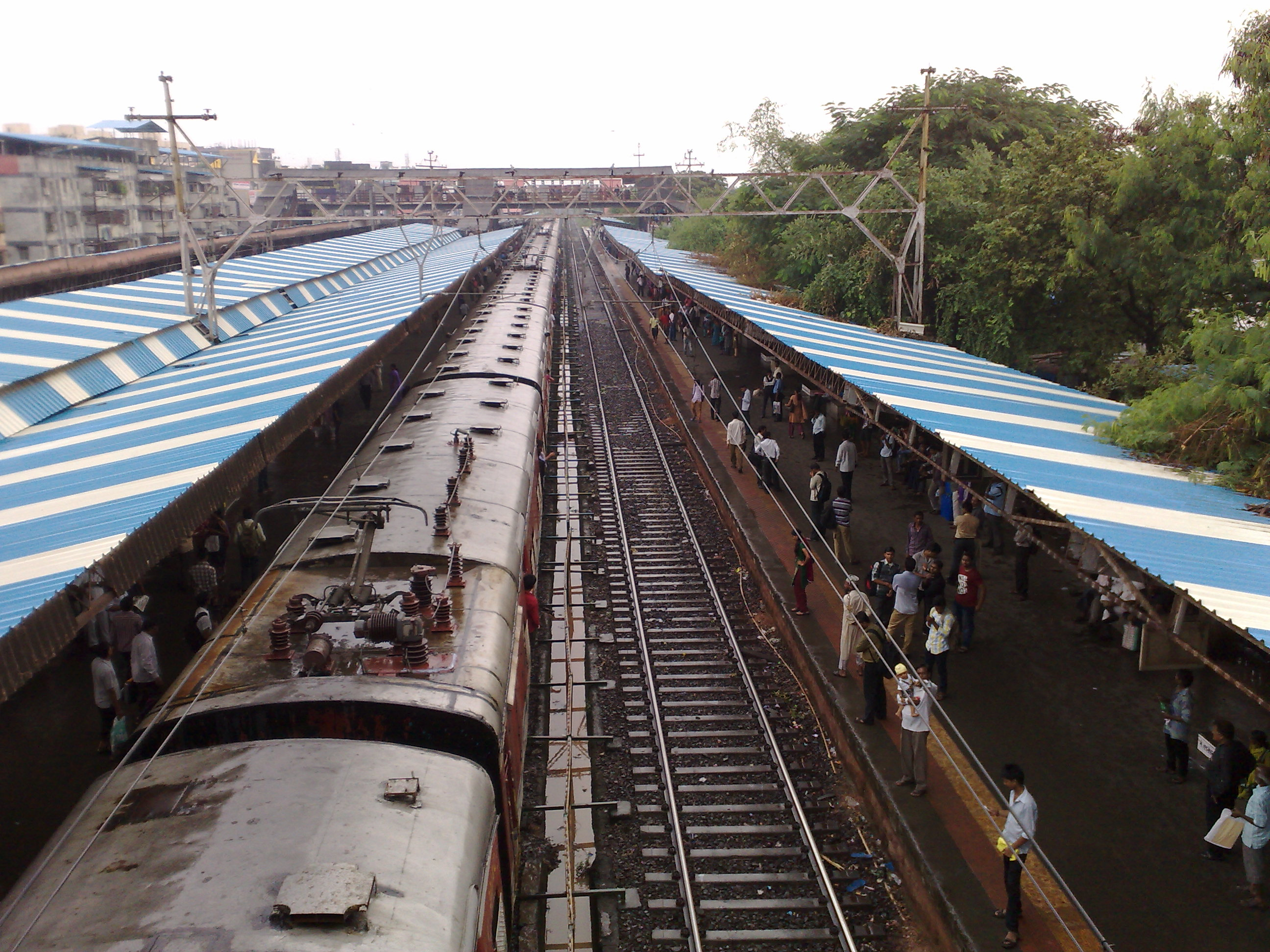
Nalla Sopara overview – Platform 1 & 2

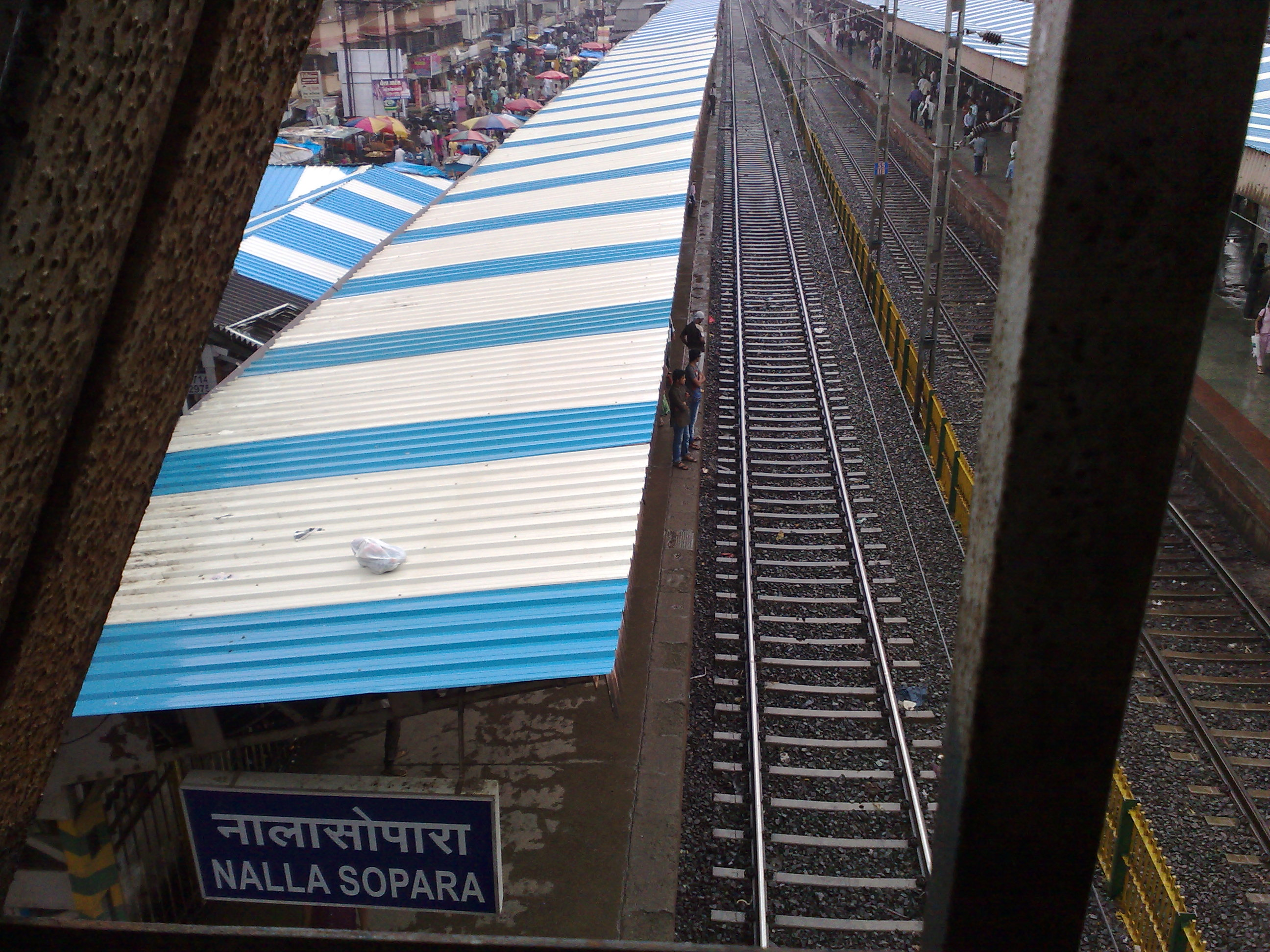
Nalla Sopara overview – Platform 3 & 4
