= Western line (Mumbai Suburban Railway) =

Public transit system in the Mumbai Suburban Railway

Western line

Overview
- Owner: Indian Railways
- Locale: Mumbai, Maharashtra, India; Palghar district, Maharashtra, India
- Termini: Churchgate (south); Dahanu Road (north)
- Stations: 39
- Website: Western Railways

Service
- System: Mumbai Suburban Railway
- Operator: Western Railway zone
- Depot(s): Virar, Kandivli, Mumbai Central
- Rolling stock: Jessop, Alstom, Siemens, Bombardier, Medha
- Daily ridership: 2.657 million (2022-23)
- Ridership: 969.805 million (annual; 2022-23)

History
- Opened: 12 April 1867; 159 years ago

Technical
- Line length: 123.78 km (76.91 mi)
- Character: At grade
- Track gauge: 1,676 mm (5 ft 6 in)
- Electrification: 25,000 V AC through overhead catenary

The Western line of the Mumbai Suburban Railway is an Indian public transit system serving Mumbai Metropolitan Region, Maharashtra. It consists of 37 stations from Dahanu Road to Churchgate. It is operated by Western Railways (WR). The entire line is at grade.

Trains are differentiated as slow and fast locals. Slow trains stop at all stations, while fast ones stop at main stations only and are preferable over longer distances. Trains usually start from and terminate at main stations. The section from Churchgate to Virar is a Quadruple track. An EMU car shed has been built between Nallasopara and Virar which is the largest car shed in both India and Asia. A repair shop for EMUs is situated at Mahalaxmi. There are also EMU car sheds at Mumbai Central and Kandivli. A new EMU car shed at Vangaon has been proposed to support the growing number of local trains to Dahanu Road after the quadrupling project is finished.

== History ==
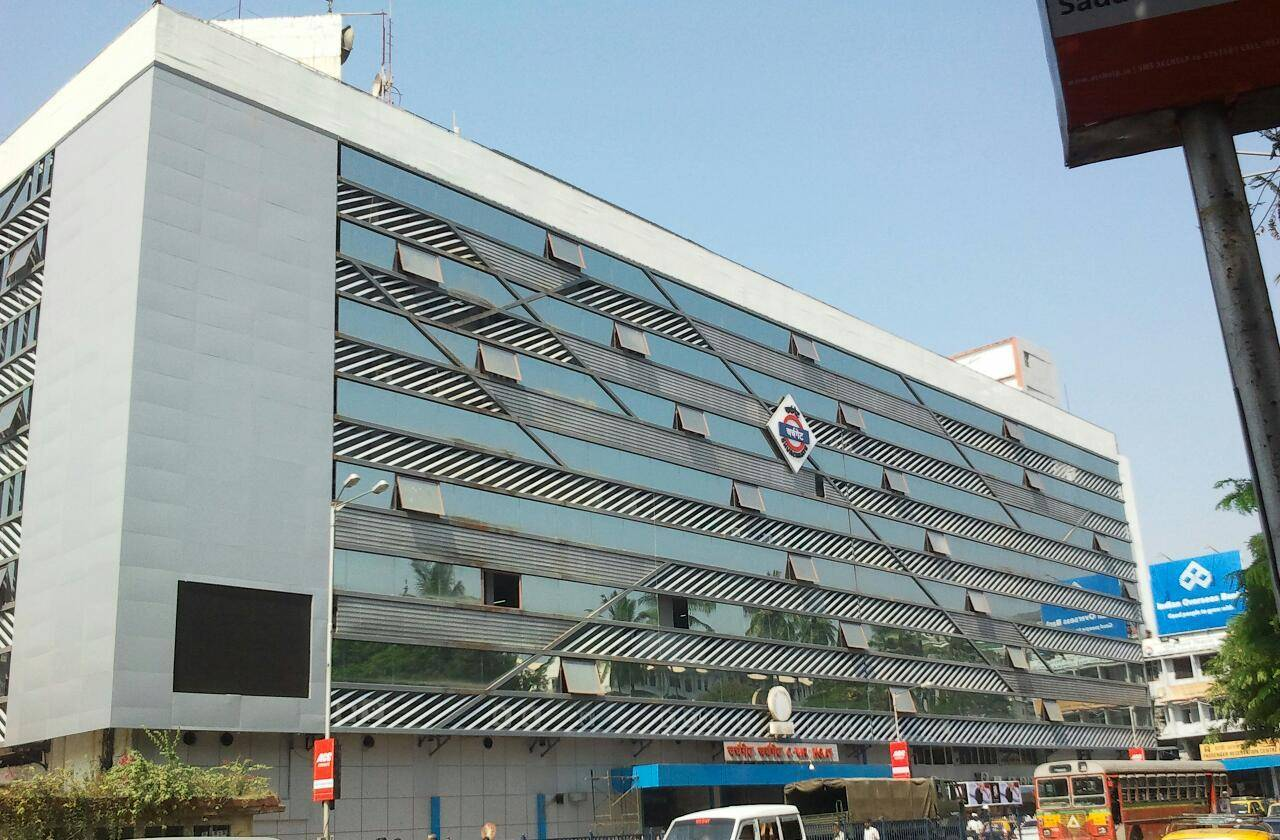
Churchgate Station, Western Railway HQ

Suburban service on what is now the Western line was offered by the Bombay, Baroda and Central India Railway, which began running steam trains in 1867. Rakes operating on DC electricity were introduced on 5 January 1928. Leslie Wilson (politician), the then-Governor of Bombay inaugurated the line running between Colaba and Borivali at Mahalaxmi, in the presence of 700 invitees.

When the section between Colaba and Borivali was electrified in 1928, two lines were electrified between Colaba and Grant Road and between Bandra and Borivali, while four lines were electrified between Grant Road and Bandra. Between Bandra and Borivali, two other non-electrified lines were used by steam locomotives hauling passenger and freight trains. In 1936, all four lines between Bandra and Borivali and two lines between Borivali to Virar were electrified, thus eliminating steam locomotives there.

The proposal to ply Electric Multiple Unit (EMU) trains between Dahanu and Churchgate was approved in the 2012–13 Railway Budget. In March 2013, 18 MEMU services ran between Virar and Dahanu daily.

On 16 April 2013, the 160th anniversary of the Indian Railways, Railway Minister Pawan Kumar Bansal inaugurated the first EMU service between Churchgate and Dahanu Road. The first Churchgate-Dahanu local was flagged off around 10:47am and arrived at Churchgate at 1:44pm. Prior to the launch of this service, EMU services on WR only ran on the 60 km stretch between Churchgate and Virar.

The Western Line transported 127.94 crore passengers (1.28 billion) in the 2016-17 fiscal year. This is higher than the population of India according to the 2011 Census, which was recorded as 121.01 crores. During the same period, Western Railway sold 270.3 million tickets and 13.7 million season passes, earning a total revenue of ₹818.48 crore (US$87 million) from its suburban rail operations.

=== Timeline ===
- 1864: BB&CI train reaches Mumbai, runs between Grant Road and Ahmedabad
- 12 April 1867: Local service commences between Virar and Back Bay
- 1870: Churchgate station opened.
- 1873: Line extended to Colaba terminus
- January 1899: BB&CI Headquarters building completed
- 1928: First electric suburban train ran from Colaba to Borivali
- 1930: Colaba station closed, Churchgate becomes the new suburban Terminus
- 5 November 1951: BB&CI renamed Western Railway
- 3 March 1961: 9-coach suburban trains introduced
- 1972:
  - Total no. of suburban services crossed 500 (501 trains)
  - Churchgate - Mumbai central section became a four-track section.
- 1986: 12 coach service started on Dadar - Virar section
- 5 May 1992: World's first Ladies Special service introduced on WR
- 1992: Exclusive Accommodation for Senior Citizens introduced in suburban trains
- 1994: Coupon Validating Machines (CVMs) introduced on WR
- 2001: Introducing of First DC/AC 12 car suburban service
- 2002: Western Railway reorganised
- 2003: Train Management System (TMS) started on Mumbai Suburban
- 2003: Number of WR suburban services per day crossed 1000
- 2006: First Unreserved Ticketing System (UTS) started over WR’s Mumbai suburban section
- 2007:
  - Indian Railways' first Automated Ticket Vending Machines (ATVMs) introduced on WR
  - Borivali - Virar section became a four-track section on 7 July. Inauguration was with a Millenium Rake by Yadav.
  - First Siemens rake entered service on 12 November
- 2009: 15 car trains introduced
- 28 February 2010: Borivali - Virar slow line section charged with 25 KV AC (though fast lines have already been under AC traction).
- 2011: 15 car trains extended till Churchgate
- 2011: Vile Parle - Borivali section charged with 25 KV AC
- 4 February 2012: Last DC local train ran on WR
- 5 February 2012: Churchgate – Vile Parle section charged with 25 KV AC
- 20 November 2012: 9 car services phased out from Main Line
- 2013: Suburban EMU trains extended up to Dahanu Road
- 2013: 150th year of arrival of trains on Western lines in Mumbai
- 2014: Fixed denomination windows for speedy dispersal of Suburban tickets
- 2014: Mobile ticketing launched on Mumbai Suburban Section
- 2015: India’s first suburban train with closing doors (in first class ladies coach) started, First CCTV in ladies coach
- 2015: First Bombardier rake entered service on 18 March
- 2015: Coupon Validating Machines (CVMs) discontinued, Paperless tickets through mobile
- 2017: New Suburban Rake with indigenous electrics under Make in India introduced on WR
- 25 December 2017: India’s first Air-Conditioned suburban train introduced on WR
- 29 March 2018: Harbour Line Extended from Andheri to Goregaon
- 22 March 2020: Indian Railways suspends all its passenger trains operations including suburban operations due to COVID-19 pandemic lockdown
- 28 October 2021: WR’s Mumbai suburban local trains resume to Pre – COVID level services of 1367, i.e 100% services
- January 2024: Western Railway Headquarters Building at Churchgate completes 125 years
- 2024: Total no. of WR suburban services per day crossed 1400 (1406 services), Total no. of AC suburban services crosses 100 (109 services)
- 2024: Total no. of 15 coach suburban services crosses double century mark (213 services)

== Stations ==
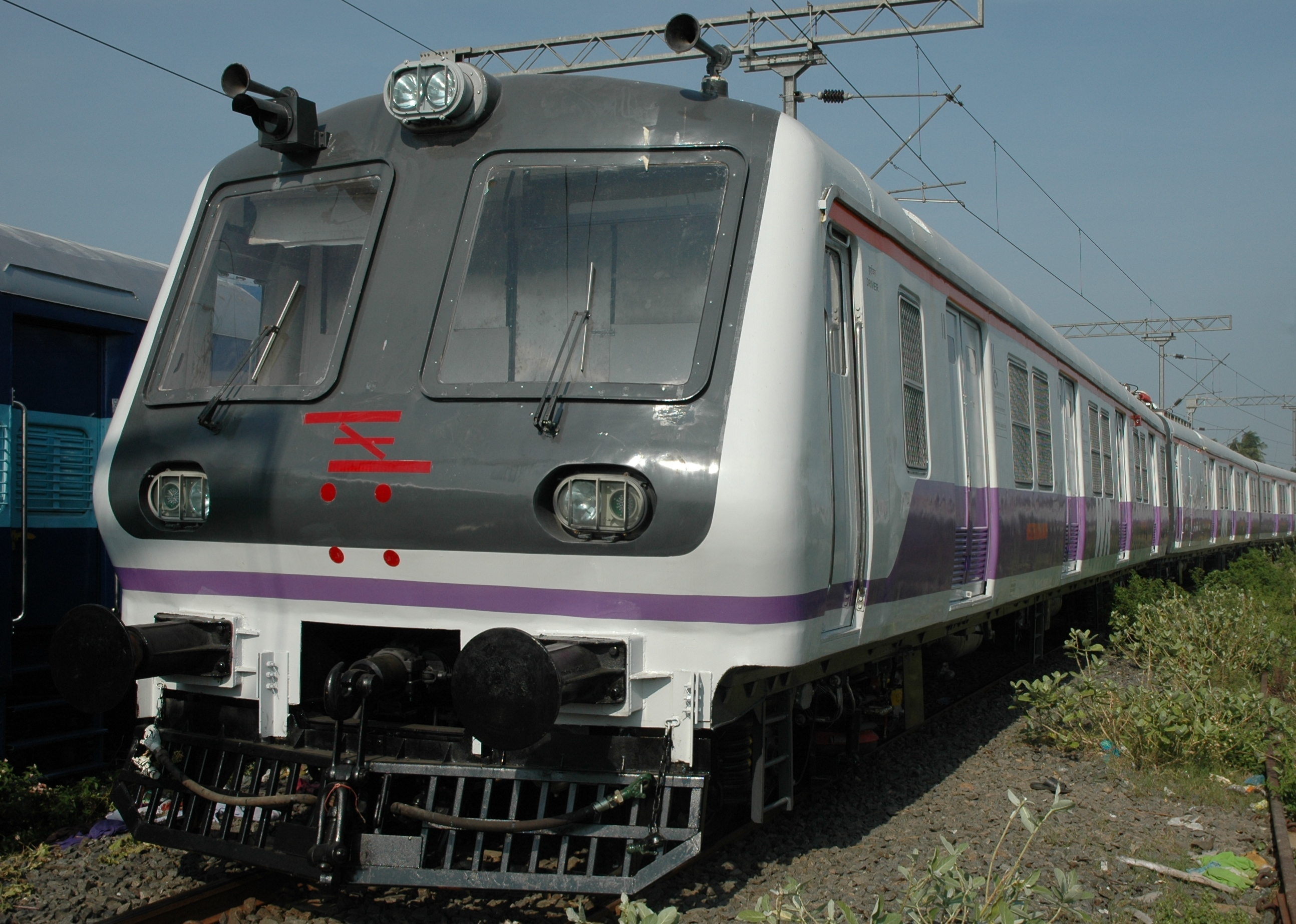
New trains on the Western Railway

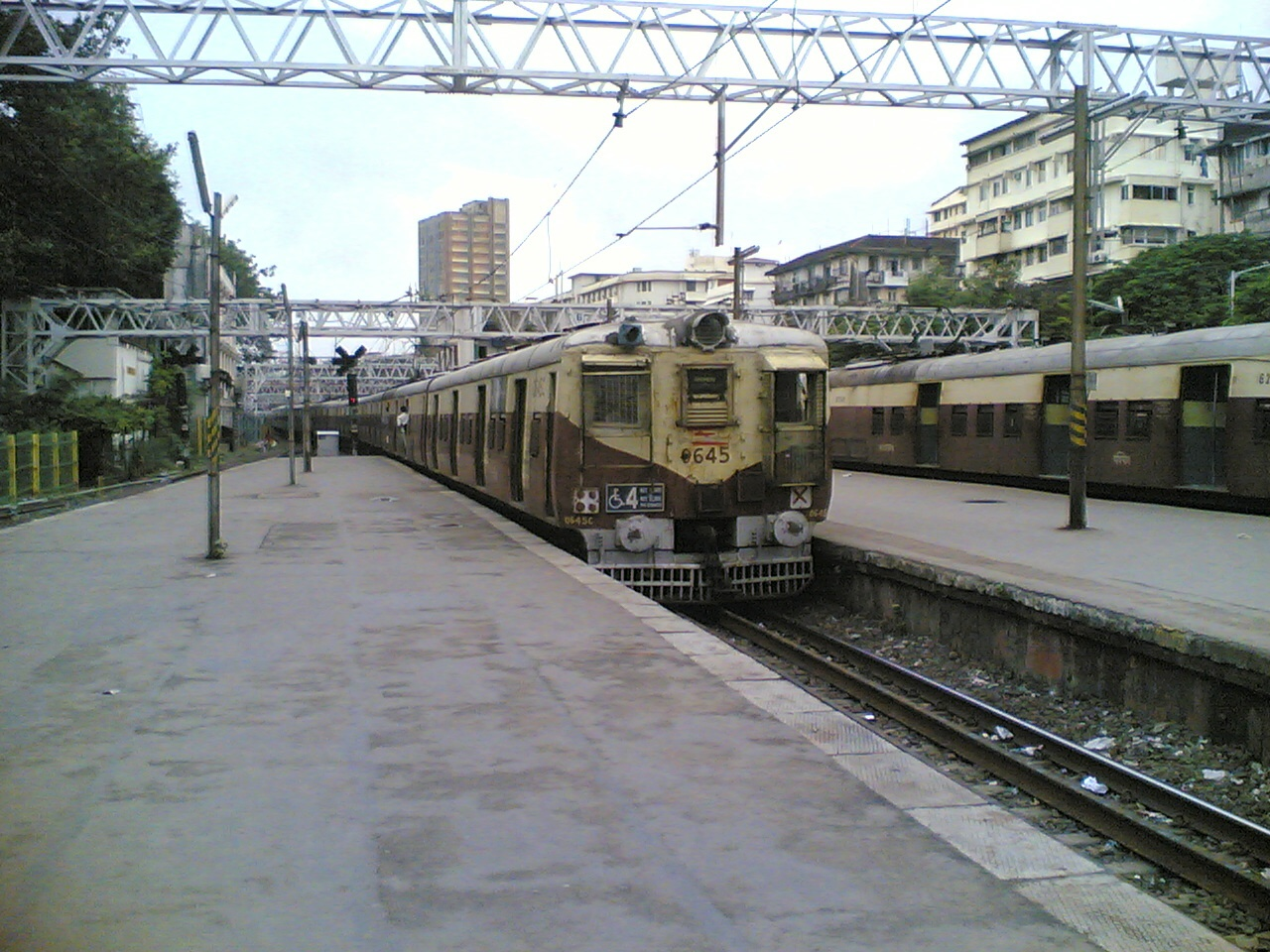
Train leaving Churchgate station

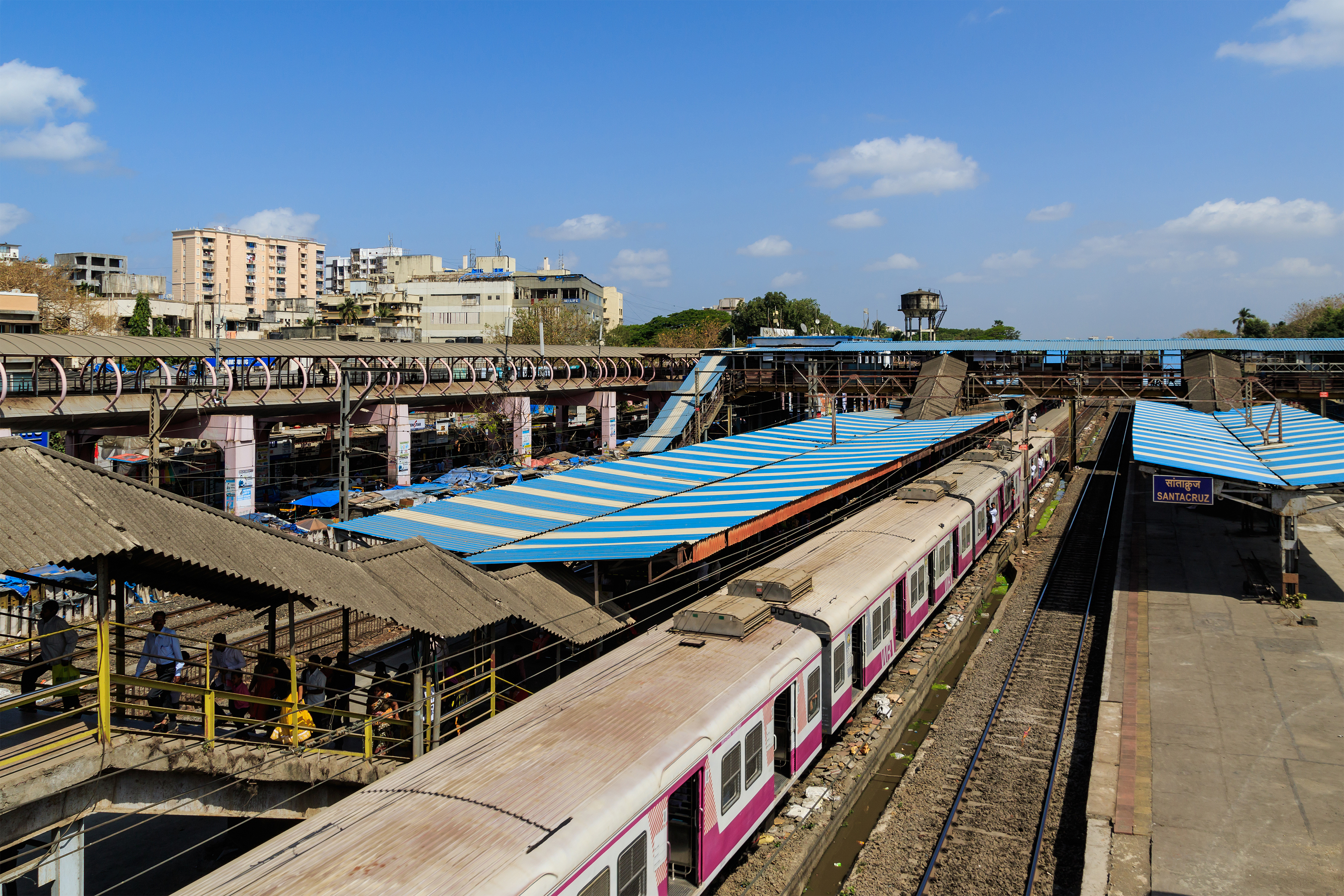
SantaCruz station

(Names in bold indicate that the station is a fast train stop.)

Western Suburban line
Station Name		Station Code	Connections
English	Marathi	Station Code	Connections
**Churchgate**	**चर्चगेट**	C/CCG	Line 3
Marine Lines‡	मरीन लाइन्स	MEL	None
Charni Road‡	चर्नी रोड	CYR	None
Grant Road‡	ग्रँट रोड	GTR	Line 3
**Mumbai Central**	**मुंबई सेंट्रल**	BC/MMCT	Indian Railways Line 3
Mahalaxmi	महालक्ष्मी	MX	Line 3 Sant Gadgil Maharaj Chowk
Lower Parel	लोअर परळ	PL	None
Prabhadevi	प्रभादेवी	PBHD	Central Parel^{†}
**Dadar**	**दादर**	D/DDR	Indian Railways and Central
Matunga Road	माटुंगा रोड	MRU	Central Matunga*
Mahim Junction	माहिम जंक्शन	MM	Harbour
**Bandra**	**वांद्रे**	B/BA	Harbour; Bandra Terminus
Khar Road	खार रोड	KHAR	Harbour
Santacruz	सांताक्रुझ	STC	Harbour
Vile Parle	विलेपार्ले	VLP	Harbour
**Andheri**	**अंधेरी**	A/ADH	Indian Railways, Harbour and Blue Line
Jogeshwari	जोगेश्वरी	JOS	Harbour
Ram Mandir	राम मंदिर	RMAR	Harbour
**Goregaon**	**गोरेगाव**	GO/GMN	Harbour
Malad	मालाड	M/MDD	None
Kandivli	कांदिवली	KILE	None
**Borivali**	**बोरीवली**	BO/BVI	Indian Railways
Dahisar	दहिसर	DIC	None
Mira Road	मीरा रोड	MIRA	None
**Bhayandar**	**भाईंदर**	BY/BYR	None
Naigaon	नायगाव	NIG	None
**Vasai Road**	**वसई रोड**	BS/BSR	Indian Railways and Vasai Road–Roha
Nallasopara	नालासोपारा	NS/NSP	None
**Virar**	**विरार**	V/VR	Indian Railways
Vaitarna	वैतरणा	VTN	None
Saphale	सफाळे	SAH	None
Kelve Road	केळवे रोड	KLV	None
**Palghar**	**पालघर**	PLG	Indian Railways
Umroli	उमरोळी	UOI	None
Boisar	बोईसर	BOR	None
Vangaon	वाणगाव	VGN	None
**Dahanu Road**	**डहाणू रोड**	DN/DRD	Indian Railways

‡ indicates the stations which Fast Up trains (to Churchgate) skip from around 5PM to 8PM.

;†A footbridge links Parel to Prabhadevi on the Western line. * A footbridge links Matunga to Matunga Road on the Western line, called Matunga Z bridge.

Churchgate railway station is the terminus railway station at the south end of Mumbai city. In Mumbai, Western Line (WR) suburban trains use this station as terminus. Long-distance trains and goods/oil tanker trains terminate at Mumbai Central railway station instead. Trains also going from Mumbai Central to other cities halt at Dadar (DDR), Andheri, Borivali, Vasai Road and Virar.

Above list of stations is mentioned from south end going towards northern suburban areas falling on WR corridor.

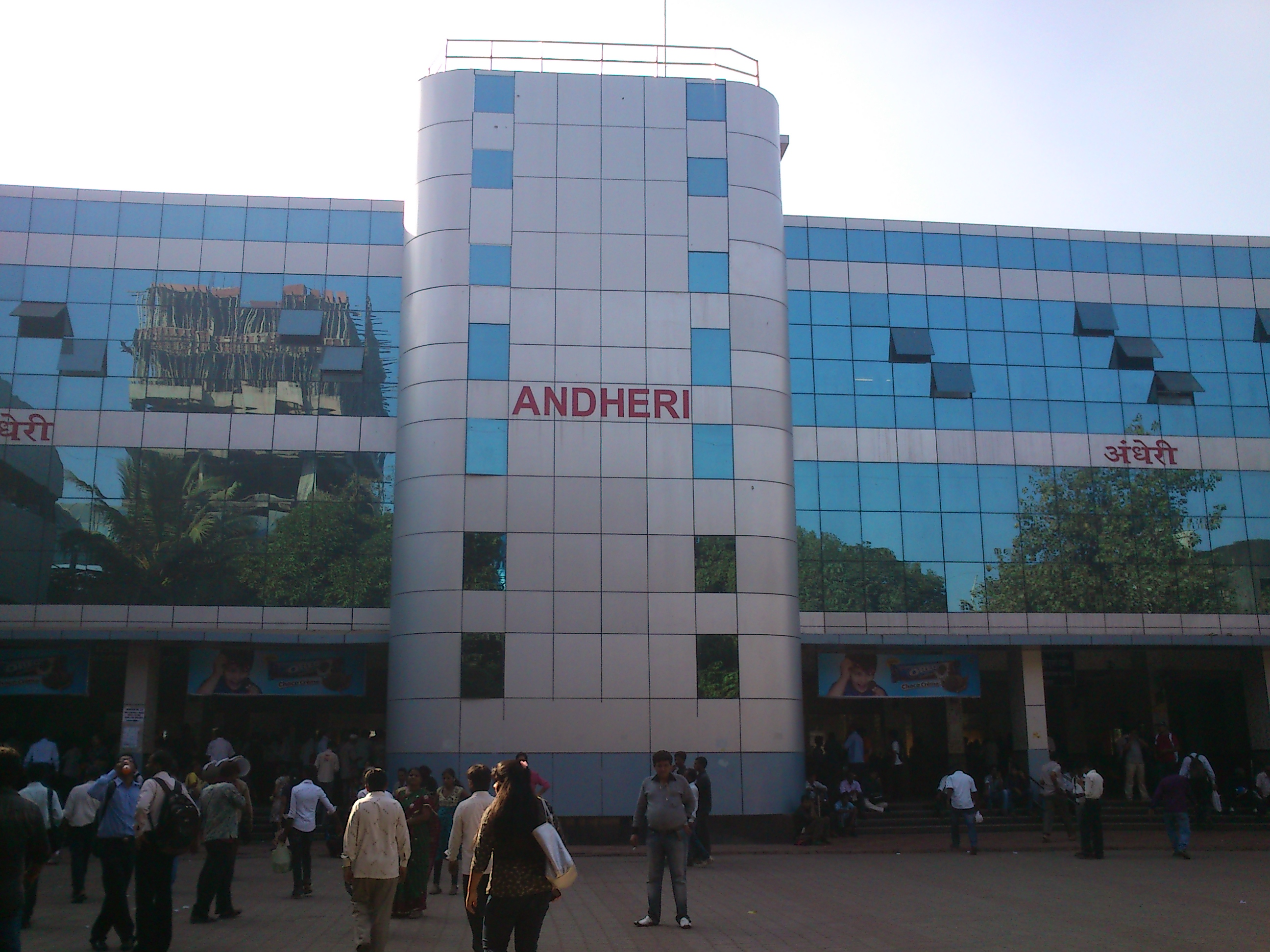
Andheri station

== Electrification ==
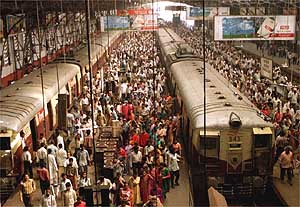
Churchgate station, during rush hour

Western Railway's EMU fleet consists of EMUs running on AC 25 kV power. WR uses seven 9-car rakes.

The Western line began running electric trains with DC power on 5 January 1928.

On 5 February 2012, WR finished converting the entire Western line from the earlier used 1,500 V DC to 25 kV AC power. The entire power conversion project cost about ₹500 crore. Since 25 kV AC power is 17 times stronger than DC, people riding on top of the trains will be killed if they come into contact with the overhead wires.

The project was also expected to improve the punctuality of train services, make them energy-efficient and allow a greater number of 12-coach and 15-coach trains to ply. Post-conversion, local trains will be able to achieve speeds of 100 km/h with ease. The next step would be to convert the remaining 9-coach trains to 12-coach ones, thus augmenting the carrying capacity by 33%. The system will need less maintenance.

While using DC traction, 22 substations provided power to suburban trains on the Western line. Since switching over to AC traction, substations at Mahalaxmi, Bandra, Jogeshwari, Borivli and Vasai supply 25 kV power to local trains.

== Services ==
As of 27 March 2012, the Western line has approximately 1,290 local services running, which carry about 3.55 million commuters every day. These 1290 local services are operated using 80 trains. Western Railways' EMUs are in 12 car and 15 car formations.

The first 9-car service on the Western line ran on 2 March 1961. The 9-car service has since been phased out, and the last service ran on the Western line on 20 November 2012. However, 10 services (six on CR and four on WR) were still operated as 9-car even after that date, as the track is shared by the Western line and the Harbour line. Harbour line platforms are too short to accommodate longer trains.

On 28 October 1986, 12-car services between Dadar and Virar were introduced. They halt at all six stations between Borivali and Virar because the Borivali-Virar section was still a double-track section for another 2 decades, making it impossible for fast locals to overtake slow locals unlike on the section between Churchgate and Borivali. Only in 2007 did fast locals started to skip Dahisar, Mira Road, Naigaon, and Nallasopara.

On 21 November 2009, 15-car services between Dadar and Virar were introduced. Originally, they halt at only two stations between Borivali and Virar, i.e. Bhayandar and Vasai Road, but now they halt at all six stations between Borivali and Virar, and halt at only one station (Mumbai Central) between Churchgate and Dadar. 15-coach trains are used in non-peak hours. They cannot be used in peak hours because the station platforms are too narrow to handle the increased foot traffic.

No. of coaches	No. of Services
Harbour Locals	110
12	1,150
15	30
Total	1,290

=== Historical ===
The following table shows the number of services and daily ridership on the Western line throughout its history.

Year	No. of Services	Daily Ridership
1867	6	No data
1990–91	866	2.3 million
1991–92	900	2.5 million
2000–01	961	2.82 million
16 April 2013	1305	3.6 million
2025	1305+	4 million

== AC Local ==
1 September 2026 updated timetable
Services	Days	Started from
13	Mon-Fri	25 December 2017
11	Daily	22 November 2021
14	Daily	16 May 2022
7+7	Daily	20 June & 8 August 2022
13	Daily	1 October 2022
13	Daily	1 October 2022
16	Mon-Fri	6 November 2023
13	Daily	27 November 2024
13	Daily	26 January 2026
12	Daily	19 February 2026
13	Daily	1 May 2026
Total	116 (Daily)	145+2 (Mon-Fri)

Up services
Train No.	Departure	Origin	Arrival	Destination	Type
94002/4	4:00	Nallasopara	5:36	Churchgate	Slow
94008	4:50	Nallasopara	6:29	Churchgate	Slow
94006	5:14	Goregaon	6:10	Churchgate	Slow
94012	5:40	Borivali	6:51	Churchgate	Slow
94026	8:06	Borivali	9:11	Churchgate	Slow
94036	8:33	Virar	10:20	Churchgate	Slow
94048	10:46	Andheri	11:32	Churchgate	Slow
94060	11:39	Goregaon	12:36	Churchgate	Slow
94072	13:55	Borivali	15:00	Churchgate	Slow
94080	14:36	Vasai Road	15:22	Andheri	Slow
94082	15:00	Virar	15:36	Borivali	Slow
94104	17:27	Borivali	18:35	Churchgate	Slow
94120	18:30	Virar	19:44	Bandra	Slow
94118	19:06	Goregaon	20:01	Churchgate	Slow
94130	20:20	Bhayandar	20:59	Andheri	Slow
94128	20:23	Borivali	21:32	Churchgate	Slow
94144	22:20	Vasai Road	22:46	Borivali	Slow
94146	22:52	Borivali	0:04	Churchgate	Slow
94148	22:56	Bhayandar	23:11	Borivali	Slow

Down services
Train No.	Departure	Origin	Arrival	Destination	Type
94001	5:07	Borivali	5:45	Virar	Slow
94003	5:35	Mahalaxmi	6:30	Borivali	Slow
94005	5:40	Churchgate	6:45	Borivali	Slow
94007	6:14	Churchgate	7:19	Borivali	Slow
94015	6:35	Churchgate	7:41	Borivali	Slow
94009	6:39	Mahalaxmi	7:34	Borivali	Slow
94019	6:55	Churchgate	8:00	Borivali	Slow
94017	6:57	Mahalaxmi	8:23	Virar	Slow
94013†	7:27	Bhayandar	7:52	Virar	Fast
94011†	7:37	Borivali	7:52	Bhayandar	Fast
94043	9:56	Churchgate	10:41	Andheri	Slow
94045	10:24	Churchgate	11:20	Goregaon	Slow
94057	11:35	Churchgate	11:45	Mumbai Central	Slow
94069	12:45	Churchgate	13:50	Borivali	Slow
94071	13:08	Churchgate	14:52	Virar	Slow
94077	13:55	Churchgate	15:17	Bhayandar	Slow
94087	15:05	Churchgate	16:13	Borivali	Slow
94081	15:27	Andheri	16:04	Bhayandar	Slow
94085	15:44	Borivali	16:25	Virar	Slow
94095	16:30	Mahalaxmi	17:23	Borivali	Slow
94109	17:57	Churchgate	18:51	Goregaon	Slow
94117	18:38	Churchgate	20:03	Bhayandar	Slow
94123	19:52	Bandra	20:43	Bhayandar	Slow
94131	20:04	Churchgate	21:02	Goregaon	Slow
94135	21:08	Andheri	21:58	Vasai Road	Slow
94139	21:23	Churchgate	22:43	Bhayandar	Slow
94141	21:39	Churchgate	22:46	Borivali	Slow
94147	23:19	Borivali	23:56	Virar	Slow
94151	0:13	Churchgate	1:33	Bhayandar	Slow
† - No Halts in between stations.

== Facilities ==
=== Escalators ===
WR has escalators at 26 stations including some main stations like Borivali, Andheri, Dadar, Vasai Road and Virar for the common people. This helps the physically challenged and senior citizens.

=== FOBs and Subways ===
As of 29 April 2013, there are 102 foot over bridges (FOB) and 8 subways on the Western line.

=== Train Management System ===
The Train Management System (TMS) is used by both staff and passengers to monitor the location of trains. TMS enables commuters to know what trains will be arriving in the next 10 minutes. The system was implemented on the Western line in 2004.

=== Wi-Fi Facility ===
Free Wi-Fi facility from the Indian Railways (RailWire) is provided at some stations of the Western Line like Churchgate, Mumbai Central, Dadar, Bandra, Khar Road, Andheri, Borivali, Bhayander, Vasai Road and Virar.

== Fatalities ==
In 2011, 1,313 commuters died in accidents on the Western line, mainly via trespassing on ten particular stretches of track. Since mid-February 2012, Railway Protection Force (RPF) personnel patrol the areas from 7am-11am and 5pm-10pm, the peak times for such incidents. Initially, they used posters in an education campaign and only cautioned offenders. They later escalated to arresting people.

== See also ==
- Western railway elevated corridor
- Mumbai Suburban Railway
- List of Mumbai Suburban Railway stations
- Western Railway zone
