= CST–Panvel fast corridor =

Proposed elevated suburban rail line in Mumbai

CST–Panvel fast corridor; CST–Panvel quadrupling project

Overview
- Status: Scrapped
- Owner: Indian Railways; Mumbai Railway Vikas Corporation (MRVC)
- Locale: Mumbai Metropolitan Region, Maharashtra
- Termini: CST; Panvel
- Connecting lines: Panvel-Karjat for Pune trains; Panvel-Roha for KR trains
- Stations: 11

Service
- Type: Local train; Express train
- System: Mumbai Suburban Railway
- Operator(s): Central Railway

Technical
- Line length: 47.78 km (29.69 mi)
- Character: Elevated and at grade
- Operating speed: 100 km/h (62 mph)

The CST–Panvel fast corridor, also known as the CST–Panvel quadrupling project, was a proposed elevated suburban rail corridor on the Harbour Line of the Mumbai Suburban Railway for air-conditioned EMUs (Electrical Multiple Units). The proposed corridor was scrapped by the Centre government on the advice of NITI ayog.

== History ==
The CST–Panvel fast corridor was first proposed in the 2009-10 Railway Budget. The proposed corridor would have been 48.3 km long, elevated for 31.6 km of the route and at grade for 12.4 km, where it would have run parallel to existing lines. The corridor would also have required the construction of a 4.3 km bridge over Thane Creek. Rail India Technical and Economic Services Limited (RITES) conducted the techno-economic feasibility study for the corridor. It estimates the project to cost ₹110 billion (US$1.3 billion).

In July 2016, the Mumbai Railway Vikas Corporation (MRVC) submitted a new plan for the corridor which received approval from the Railway Board. Under the new plan, the corridor will be 47 km long and include 11 stations. It will begin at Carnac Bunder, near CST's platform 18, and travel towards Wadi Bunder after passing above Mansion Road. From Wadi Bunder, the line passes along Dockyard Road, and then the existing CST-Panvel line until Vashi, before turning right towards Palm Beach Road. The line then follows the existing railway line from Belapur before terminating at Panvel. The CST-Mankhurd and Vashi-Belapur sections of the corridor will be elevated, and the Mankhurd-Vashi and Belapur-Panvel portions will be at grade level. Branch lines will connect the corridor with the Lokmanya Tilak Terminus and the Navi Mumbai International Airport. The airport link will begin before the bridge on the Nerul-Uran railway line.

The Union Cabinet approved ₹33,690 crore (US$4.0 billion) in funding for several projects as part of the Mumbai Urban Transport Project 3A in March 2019. However, the proposed CST-Panvel corridor was dropped from review and did not receive funding.

== Cost ==
The project is estimated to cost ₹14,561 crore (US$1.7 billion). The cost will be shared equally by the MRVC and the Government of Maharashtra.

== Infrastructure ==
=== Rolling stock ===
Unlike the Mumbai Suburban Railway, rolling stock on the line was supposed to be air-conditioned.

== Operations ==
=== Frequency ===
The frequency of train services is estimated at 4.5–5 minutes. The MRVC plans to operate 25 during peak hours. End-to-end travel time on the line will be 50 minutes. A trip from CST to Panvel on the existing Harbour Line takes 150 minutes.

=== Segregation ===
Once the quadrupling project is complete, it will segregate fast harbour local's (and even express trains) from slow harbour local's. Express trains from CSMT/LTT towards Pune/KR should be permanently rerouted via the shorter new corridor to bypass the congested Central line, thereby adding new halts in Navi Mumbai like Vashi and CBD Belapur.

== Stations ==
The line is proposed to have 11 stations.

CST–Panvel
| # | Station Name | | Station Code | Connections |
| # | English | Marathi | Station Code | Connections |
|---|---|---|---|---|
| 1 | Chhatrapati Shivaji Maharaj Terminus | छत्रपती शिवाजी महाराज टर्मिनस | CSMT | Central Line; Harbour Line |
| 2 | Cotton Green | कॉटन ग्रीन | CTGN | Harbour Line |
| 3 | Wadala Road | वडाळा रोड | VDLR | Harbour Line |
| 4 | Kurla | कुर्ला | CLA | Central Line; Harbour Line |
| 5 | Chembur | चेंबूर | CMBR | Harbour Line |
| 6 | Mankhurd | मानखुर्द | MNKD | Harbour Line |
| 7 | Vashi | वाशी | VSH | Harbour Line; Trans-Harbour Line |
| 8 | Nerul | नेरूळ | NEU | Harbour Line; Trans-Harbour Line; Port Line |
| 9 | CBD Belapur | सी.बी.डी. बेलापूर | BEPR | Harbour Line; Trans-Harbour Line; Port Line |
| 10 | Kharghar | खारघर | KHAG | Harbour Line; Trans-Harbour Line |
| 11 | Panvel | पनवेल | PNVL | Harbour Line; Trans-Harbour Line |

== See also ==
- Harbour Line
- Western railway elevated corridor
- Mumbai Suburban Railway
