= Kandivli railway station =

Railway Station in Maharashtra, India

Kandivli

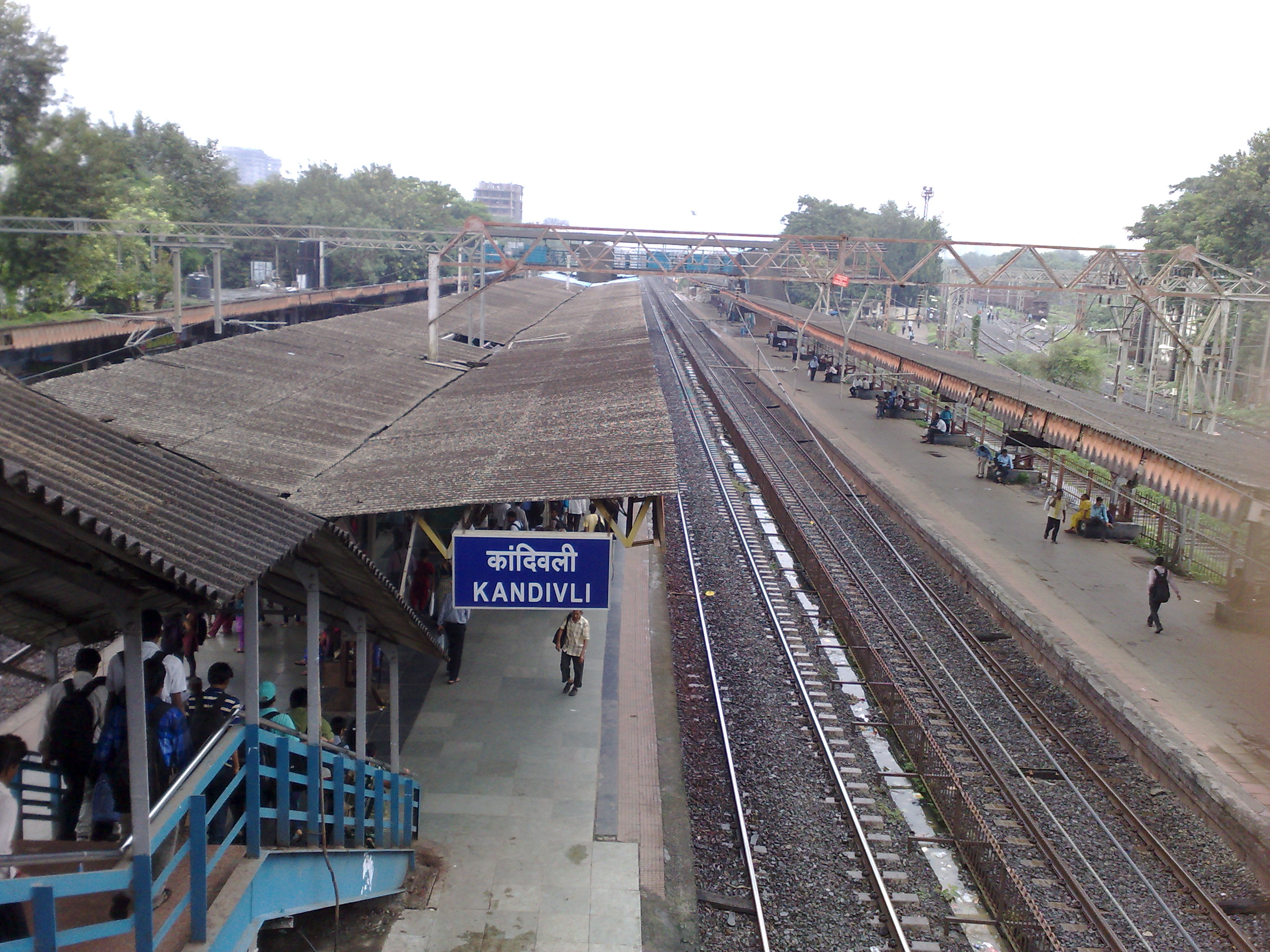

General information
- Location: Kandivli
- Coordinates: 19.2045°N 72.8520°E
- System: Mumbai Suburban Railway station
- Owner: Ministry of Railways, Indian Railways
- Line: Western Line
- Platforms: 4
- Tracks: 4

Construction
- Structure type: Standard on-ground station
- Parking: Yes
- Cycle facilities: No

Other information
- Status: Active
- Station code: KILE
- Fare zone: Western Railways

History
- Opened: 1907

Services
Preceding station	Mumbai Suburban Railway	Following station
Malad towards Churchgate	Western line	Borivali towards Dahanu Road
Route map
Location
- Location within India Location within Maharashtra Location within Mumbai

Kandivli (Pronunciation: [kaːn̪d̪iʋəliː]; formerly Khandolee, station code: KLE) is a railway station on the Western line of the Mumbai Suburban Railway network. It serves the Kandivli neighbourhood of Mumbai, India. All slow local trains temporarily halt between Kandivli and Borivali for a few seconds for signaling purposes, which commuters call an imaginary station named Thambevali. In 2020, during the COVID-19 crisis, Children's Academy, along with Project Mumbai undertook a beautification project for The Kandivali railway station.

== History ==
Kandivli is one of the oldest stations in Mumbai, opened back in 1907. The station was built at a cost of Rs. 57,211, after several petitions from the locals over three years. It was then known as Khandolee, and is said to have been mainly used to transport the stones and rocks for the Reclamation scheme in Southernmost Bombay. It was made, essentially to service the quarries. The hillock 'Paran', located east of the station, was quarried to provide this material. Subsequently, a railway workshop and worker quarters were also built.

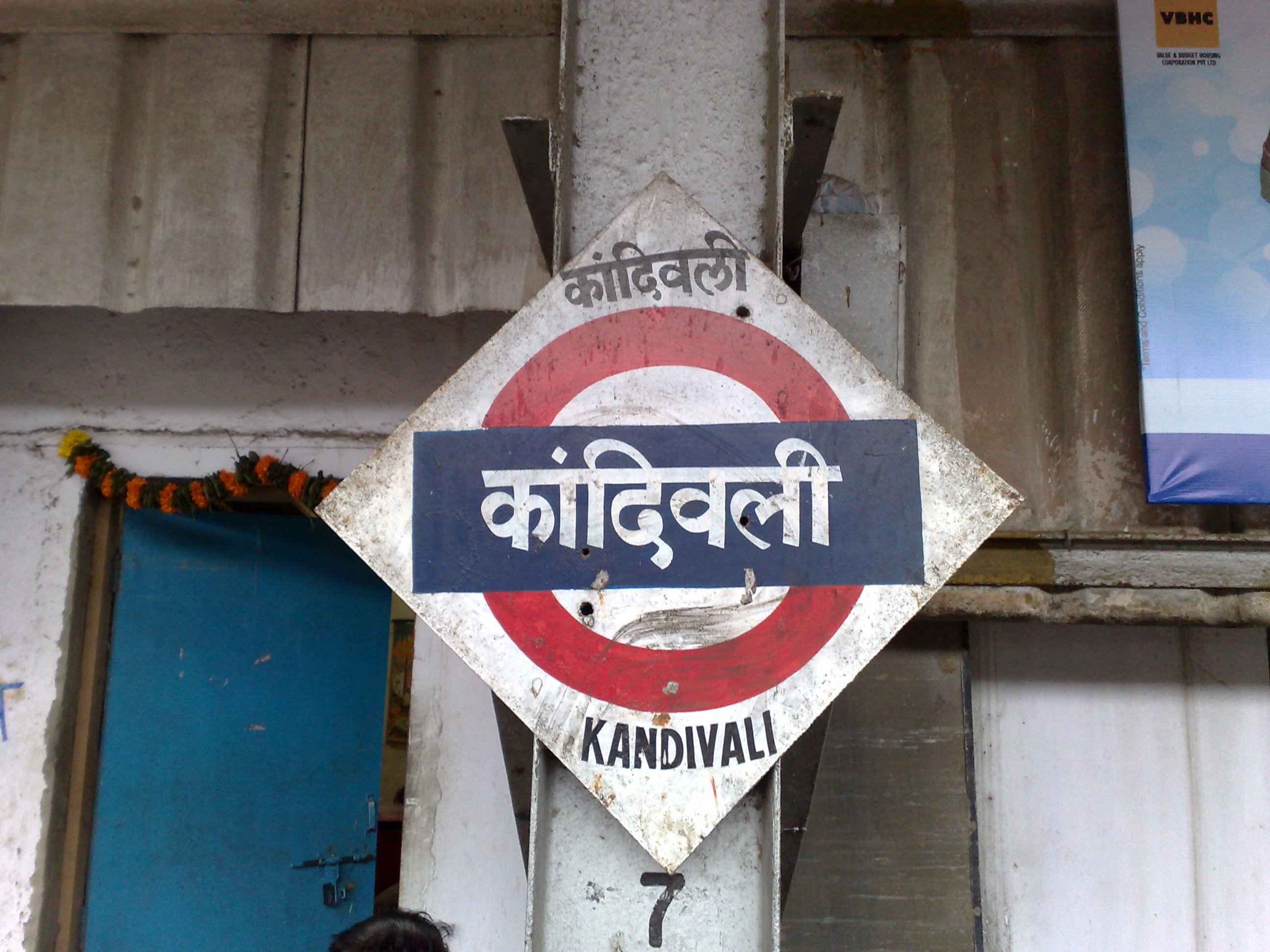

== Redevelopment plan ==
Redevelopment plans have been introduced to revamp the 18 stations of Central and Western line under the Mumbai Urban Transport Project (MUTP)-3A. Among these stations, Kandivli station is one of the 6 stations which are opted for the early redevelopment plans. The Mumbai Railway Vikas Corporation (MRVC) is slated to enhance station facilities, initiate the construction of Foot Over Bridges (FOBs), elevated decks, interconnecting pathways through FOBs and skywalks, while also fostering the creation of green spaces and other enhancements.

The work at stations will be similar as Andheri, Borivali and Goregaon, where the primary objectives were to sort out the congestion and facilitating the efficient dispersion of passengers at an ease experience.

Kandivli station, along with three other stations, has been included in the Amrit Bharat Station Scheme. This initiative aims to develop railway stations across Indian Railways. In Maharashtra, 132 stations have been selected for revamp under this scheme. The project involves creating master plans and implementing them in phases to enhance the amenities at these stations.
