= Malad railway station =

Railway station in Mumbai, Maharashtra, India

Malad

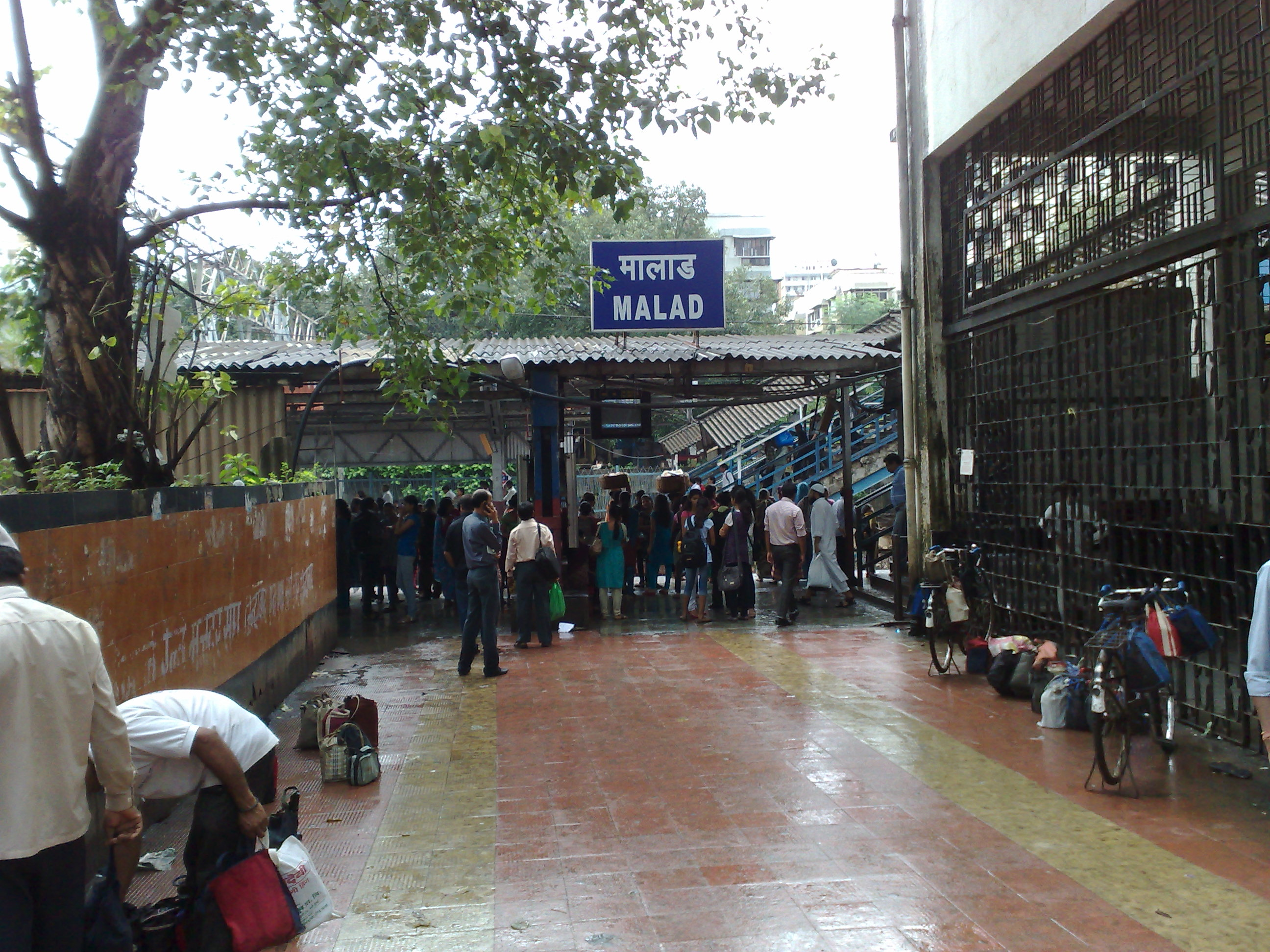

General information
- Location: Malad
- Coordinates: 19.1870°N 72.8489°E
- System: Mumbai Suburban Railway station
- Owner: Ministry of Railways, Indian Railways
- Line: Western Line

Construction
- Structure type: Standard on-ground station
- Parking: Available for Two wheeler

Other information
- Status: Active
- Station code: MDD
- Fare zone: Western Railways

Services
Preceding station	Mumbai Suburban Railway	Following station
Goregaon towards Churchgate	Western line	Kandivli towards Dahanu Road
Route map
Location
- Location within Mumbai

Malad railway station (Pronunciation: [maːlaːɖ]; station code: MDD) is on the Western line of the Mumbai Suburban Railway network. It serves the Mumbai suburb of Malad.

== Gallery ==
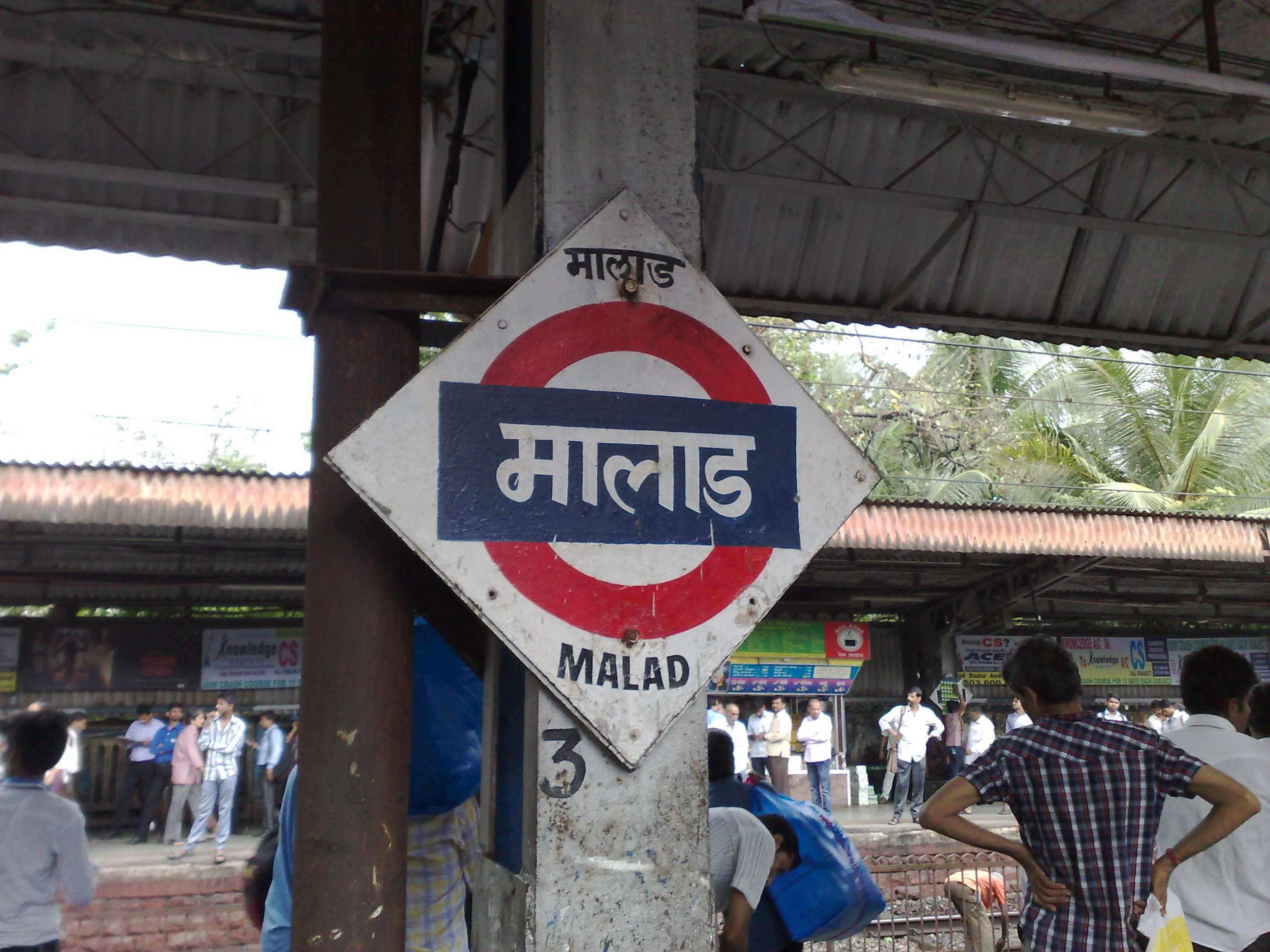
Malad station board - Marathi

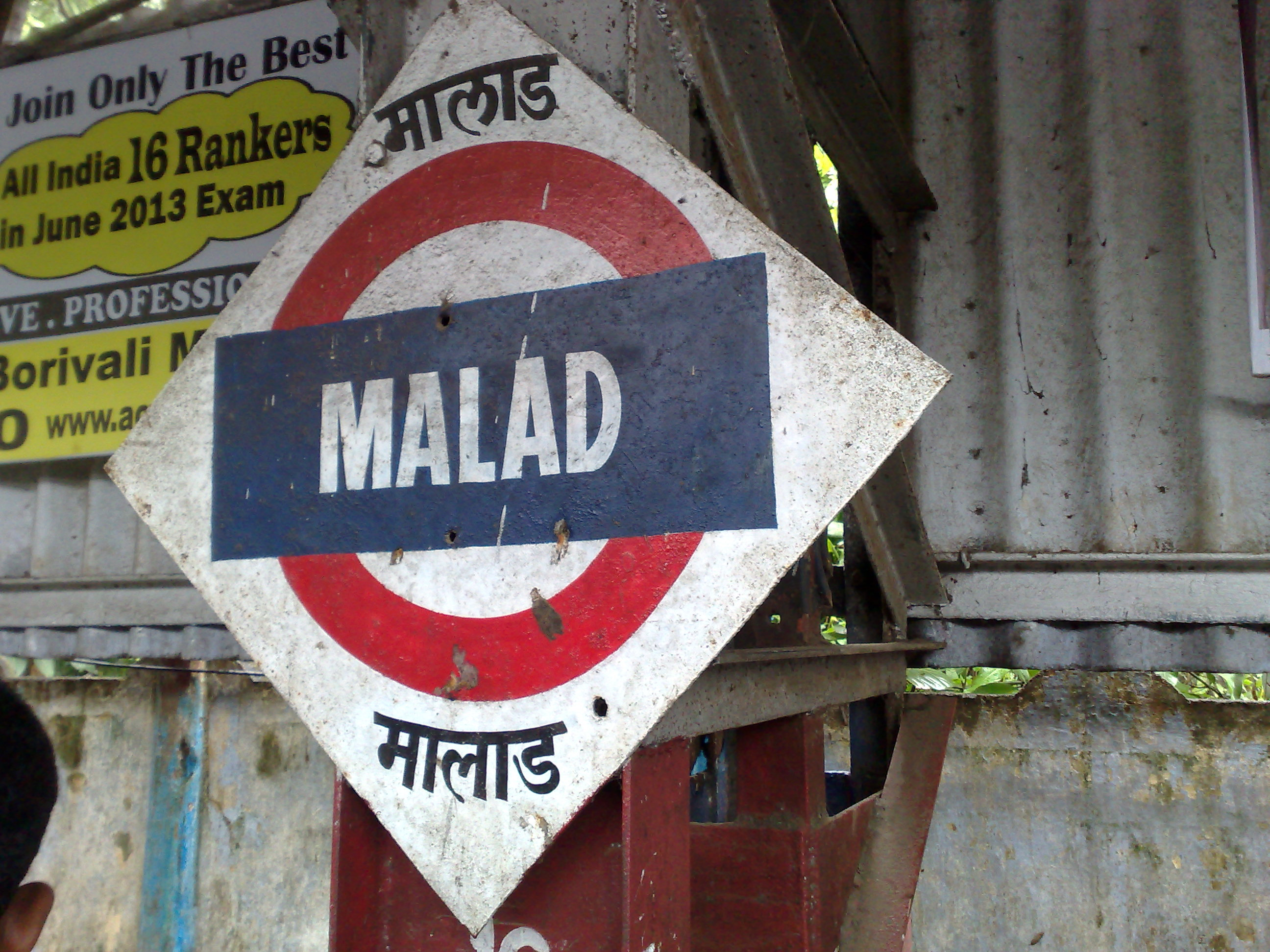
Malad station board - English
