= Bhayandar railway station =

Railway Station in Maharashtra, India

Bhayandar

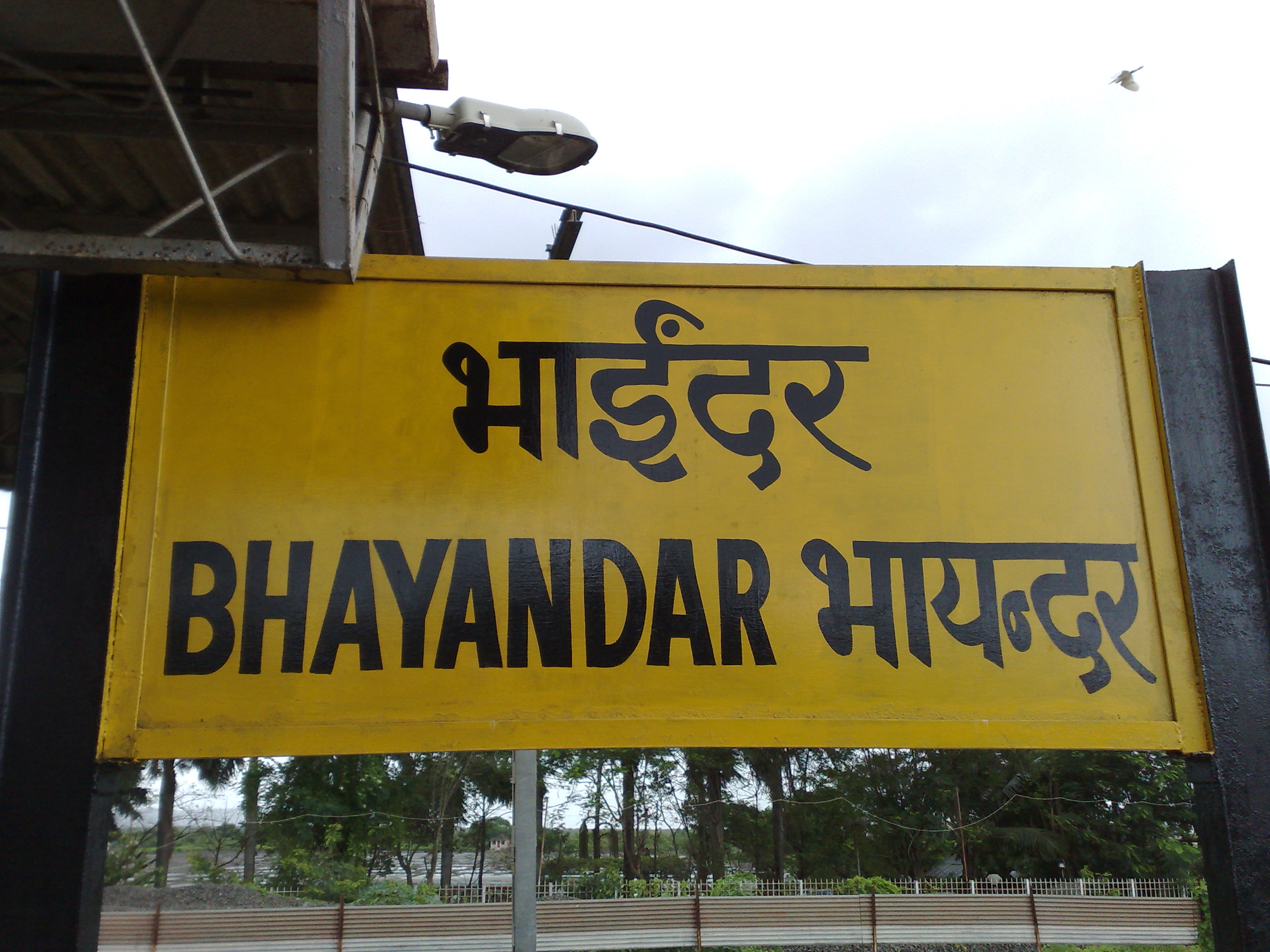

General information
- Location: Bhayandar
- Coordinates: 19.311448°N 72.852651°E
- System: Mumbai Suburban Railway station
- Owner: Ministry of Railways, Indian Railways
- Line: Western Line
- Platforms: 6
- Tracks: 6

Construction
- Structure type: Standard on-ground station
- Platform levels: 5m above sea level.
- Parking: Yes

Other information
- Status: Active
- Station code: BYR
- Fare zone: Western Railway zone

Passengers
- 2012-13: 2,61,042

Services
Preceding station	Mumbai Suburban Railway	Following station
Mira Road towards Churchgate	Western line	Naigaon towards Dahanu Road
Route map
Location
- Location within India Location within Mumbai

Bhayandar (station code: BYR) is a railway station on Western Railway's Mumbai Suburban Railway network.

== History ==
The sanction to open the station was issued in 1868. In 1873, passenger traffic stood at 33,455, rising to 47,226 passengers by 1880. Goods traffic at the station too rose from 2,627 metric tonnes to 19,770 tonnes in the same interval.

== Public Transport ==
Bhayandar station is also served by three bus services including BEST Transport and MBMT Transport which serves the other areas in the Western Suburbs and Mumbai City District, and TMT Transport buses, serving the areas of Thane and Navi Mumbai.

== Gallery ==
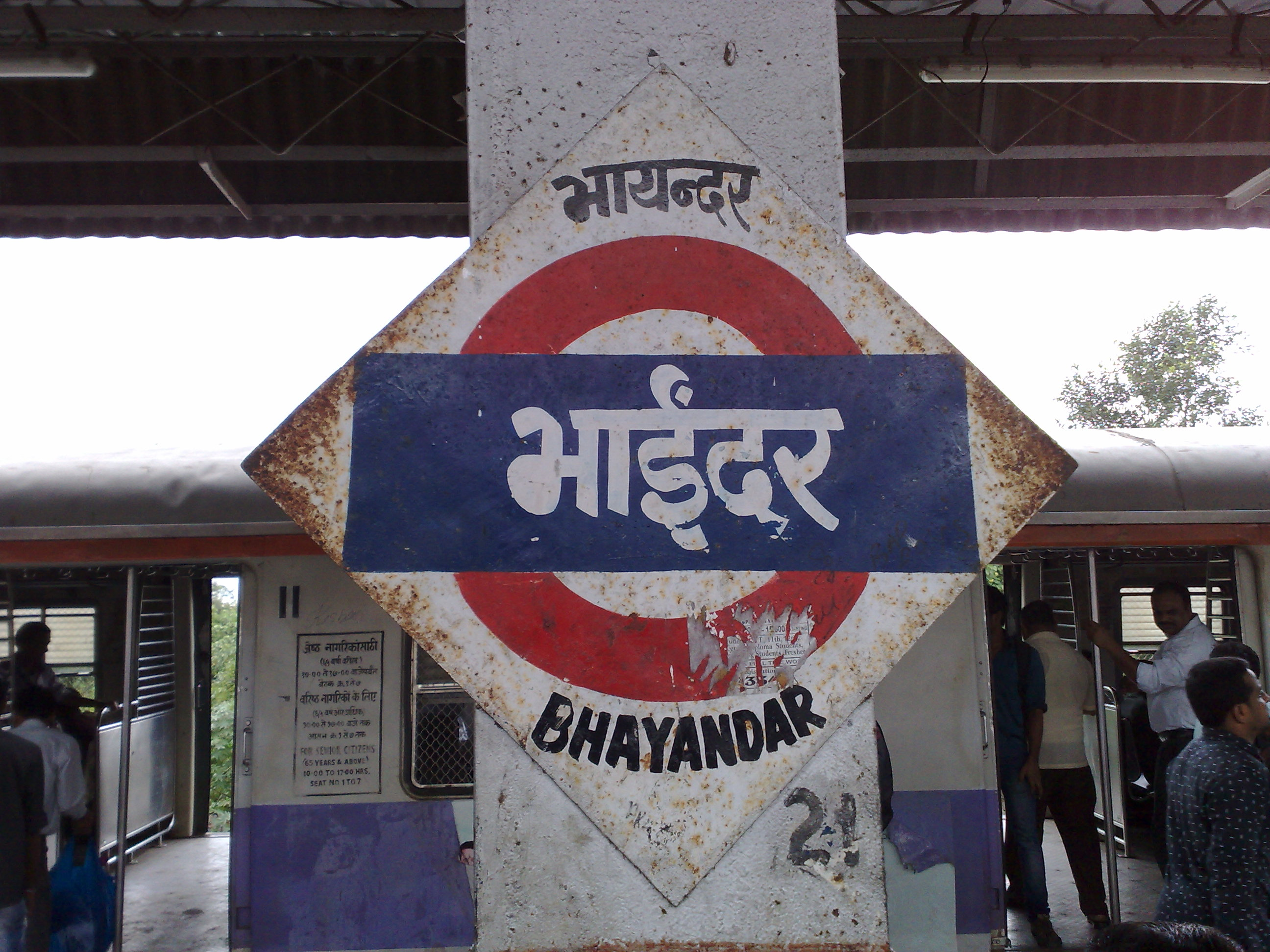
Bhayandar platform board

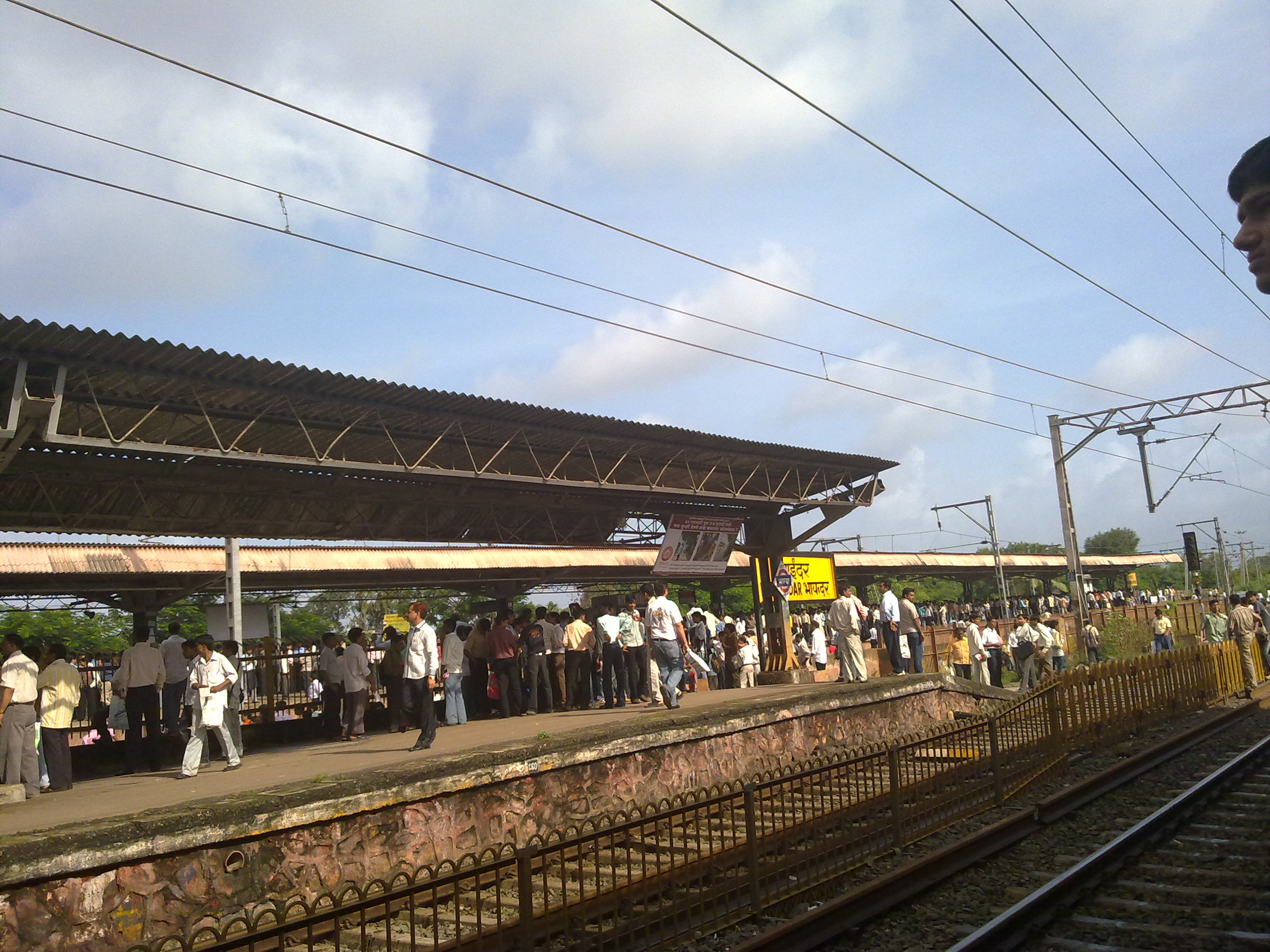
Bhayandar Station Platform view
