= Dahisar railway station =

Railway station in Maharashtra, India

Dahisar

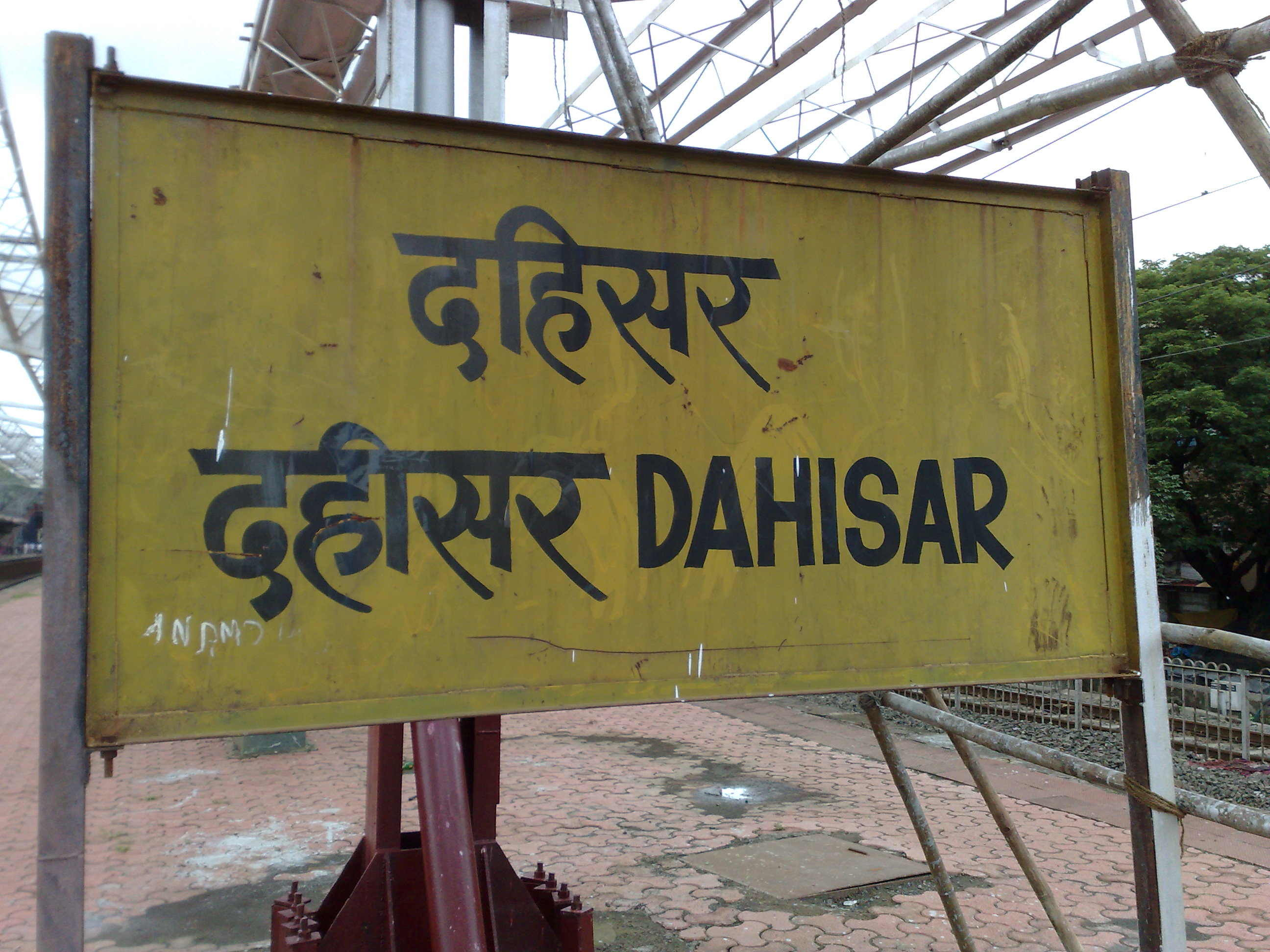

General information
- Location: Dahisar
- Coordinates: 19.2501°N 72.8593°E
- System: Mumbai Suburban Railway station
- Owner: Ministry of Railways, Indian Railways
- Line: Western Line
- Platforms: 4
- Tracks: 4
- Connections: Line 2A Line 7 Dahisar East

Construction
- Structure type: Standard on-ground station
- Parking: Yes
- Cycle facilities: No

Other information
- Status: Active
- Station code: DIC
- Fare zone: Western Railways

Services
| Preceding station | Mumbai Suburban Railway | Following station |
|---|---|---|
| Borivali towards Churchgate | Western line | Mira Road towards Dahanu Road |
Route map
Location
- Location within Mumbai

Dahisar (station code: DIC) is a railway station on the Western line of the Mumbai Suburban Railway network. Dahisar station is the last station within the Brihanmumbai Municipal Corporation limits. The area around the station has heavy traffic and is congested.

With the construction of the railway line connecting Dahisar to the city of Mumbai in 1867, came the first lot of migrants, the people from the Sindhudurg region of Konkan. These migrants established the first planned residential areas of Dahisar - Maratha Colony in Dahisar East, and Mhatre Wadi in the West. The Railway authorities wanted to name the station at Dahisar as Mount Poinsur, but the locals opposed this move and forced the authorities to name it as Dahisar. Currently, it has 4 platforms, with 2 for the Slow line (Up and Down) and 2 for The fast line (Up and Down). All platforms can handle 15-coach Suburban trains.

The station was originally named Mount Poinsur, after the locality of the Our Lady of the Immaculate Conception Church in Borivali. Due to demands from local residents who referred to the area as Dahisar, the Railways agreed to rename the station.

== Connectivity ==
=== Dahisar East ===
Dahisar station mostly serves the areas of Ghartanpada, Rawalpada, Kokanipada, Ovaripada, Anand Nagar, Shailendra Nagar, Vaishali Nagar, Parbat Nagar, Dahisar Check Naka, Ketki pada etc. Auto Rikshaw services (individually and sharing both) are available to the above-mentioned areas. Since the road leading to Dahisar station is narrow, no buses directly ply till the entrance of Dahisar station. Only one bus route (route 696, towards Diamond Industries) had been started directly serving the railway station but discontinued due to low patronage.

Bharucha road or a skywalk above it connects the station entrance to SV Road near Canara Bank (distance 360m) and from there, buses plying to Mira road (701,703,710), Bhayander (709,710), Dahisar Check Naka, Western Park Mira road (705), Borivali East, Kandivali East (701), Samta Nagar Kandivali (703), Goregaon Dindoshi (705), Bandra (225), Shivajinagar Mankhurd via Aarey Colony, Powai, Vikhroli, Ghatkopar (489) are available.

=== Dahisar West ===
LT road runs parallel to railway line and also immediately outside station entrance. It mostly serves the areas of Dahisar Bridge, Kandarpada, Navagaon, St. Francis school etc. Skywalk connects the areas of Gomant Nagar/Dahisar Phatak and Dahisar Bridge. Buses are available to Borivali Station West (205,208), Jogeshwari West (205), Dahisar Bridge (204) and Saraswati complex/Anand Nagar Dahisar East (208).

=== Metro Connectivity ===
The Mumbai Metro Line 7 (Red Line), which runs from Andheri (West) to Gundavali and further extends towards Dahisar East, provides an additional mode of transport for residents and commuters. The Dahisar East metro station is located close to the Dahisar railway station, offering convenient interchange options between suburban train and metro services. This line has significantly improved north-south connectivity along the western suburbs of Mumbai, easing traffic congestion on the Western Express Highway.

== Gallery ==
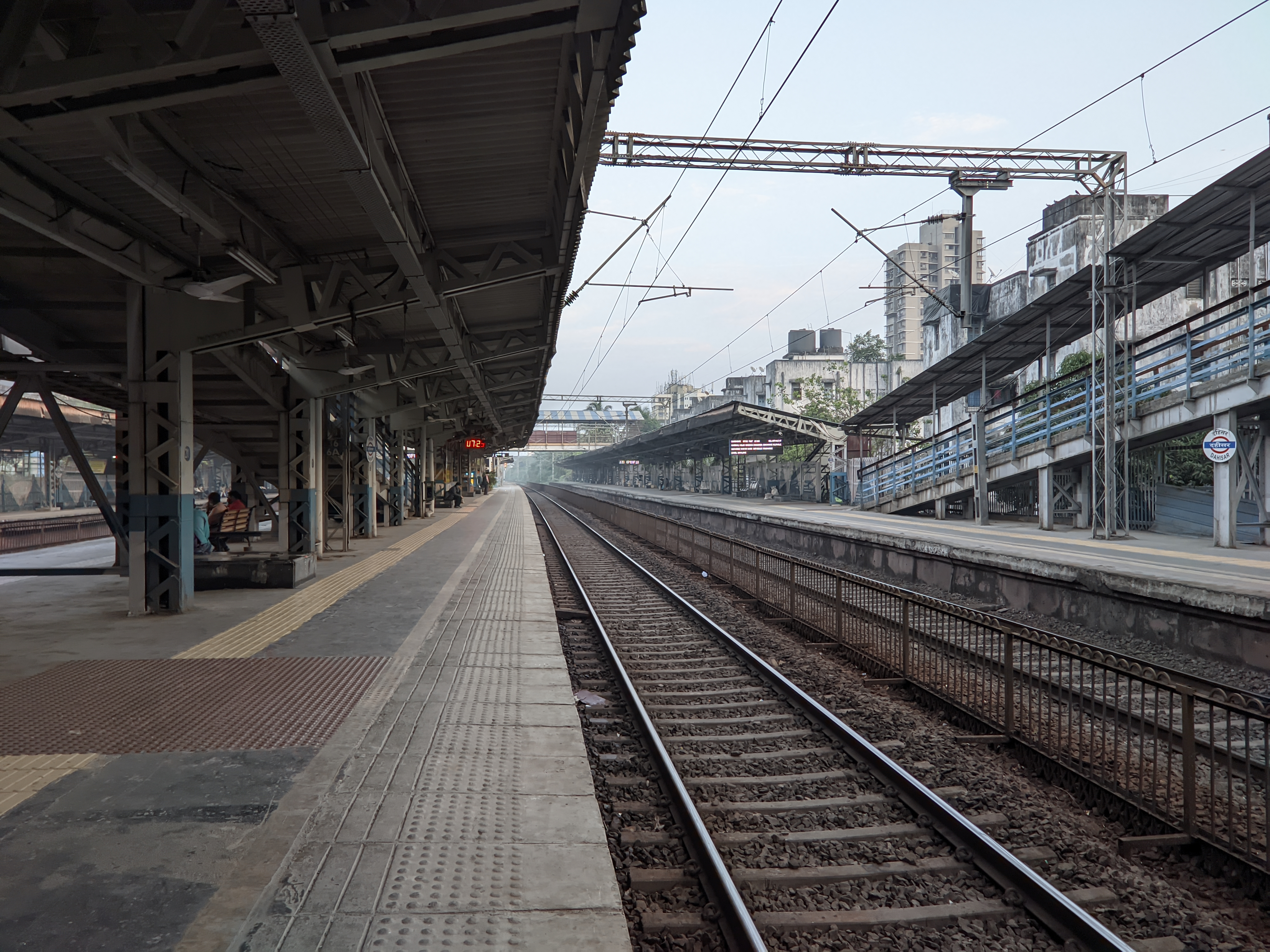
Dahisar Railway Station:Platform view

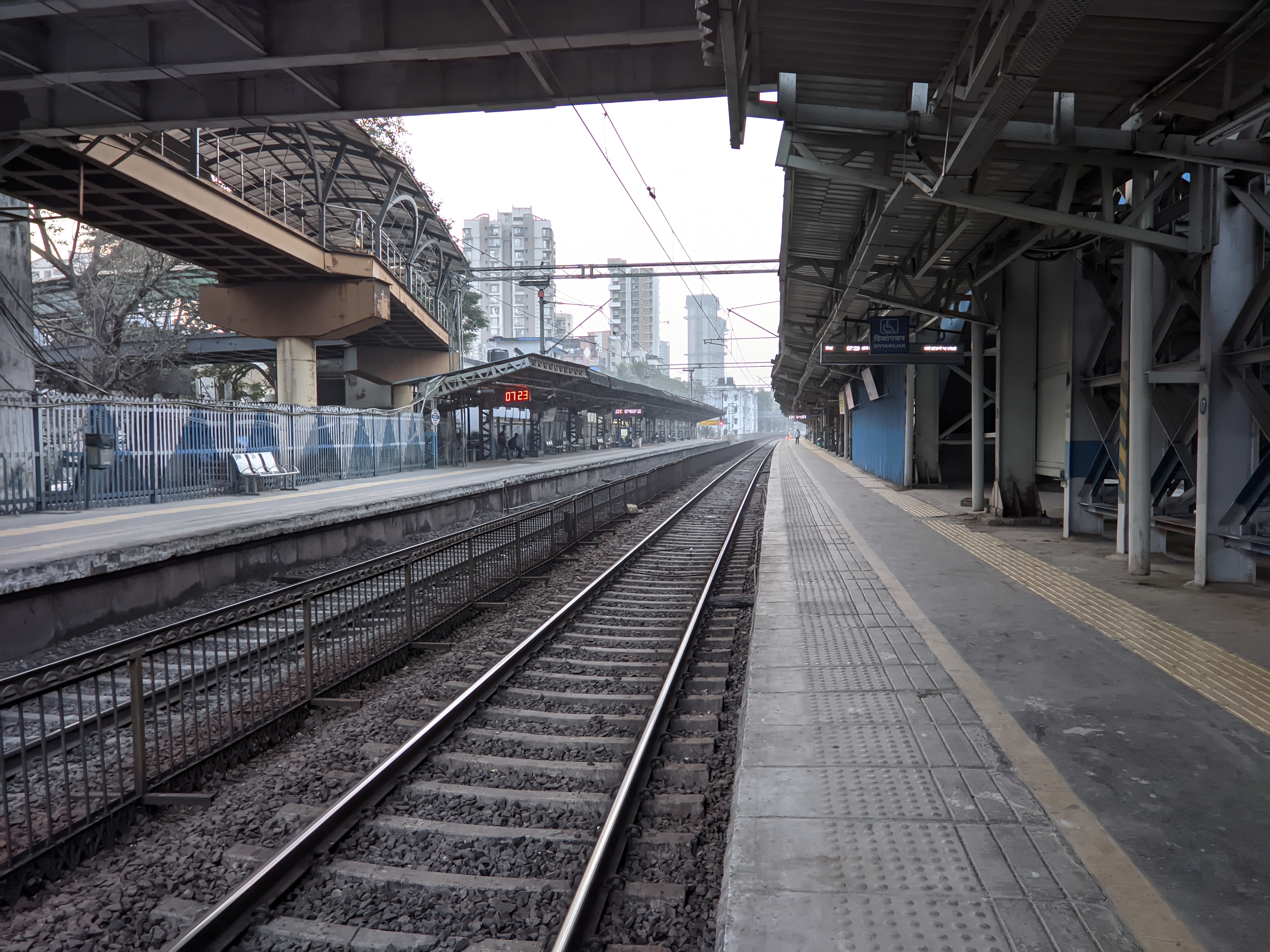
Dahisar Station Platforms 3&4

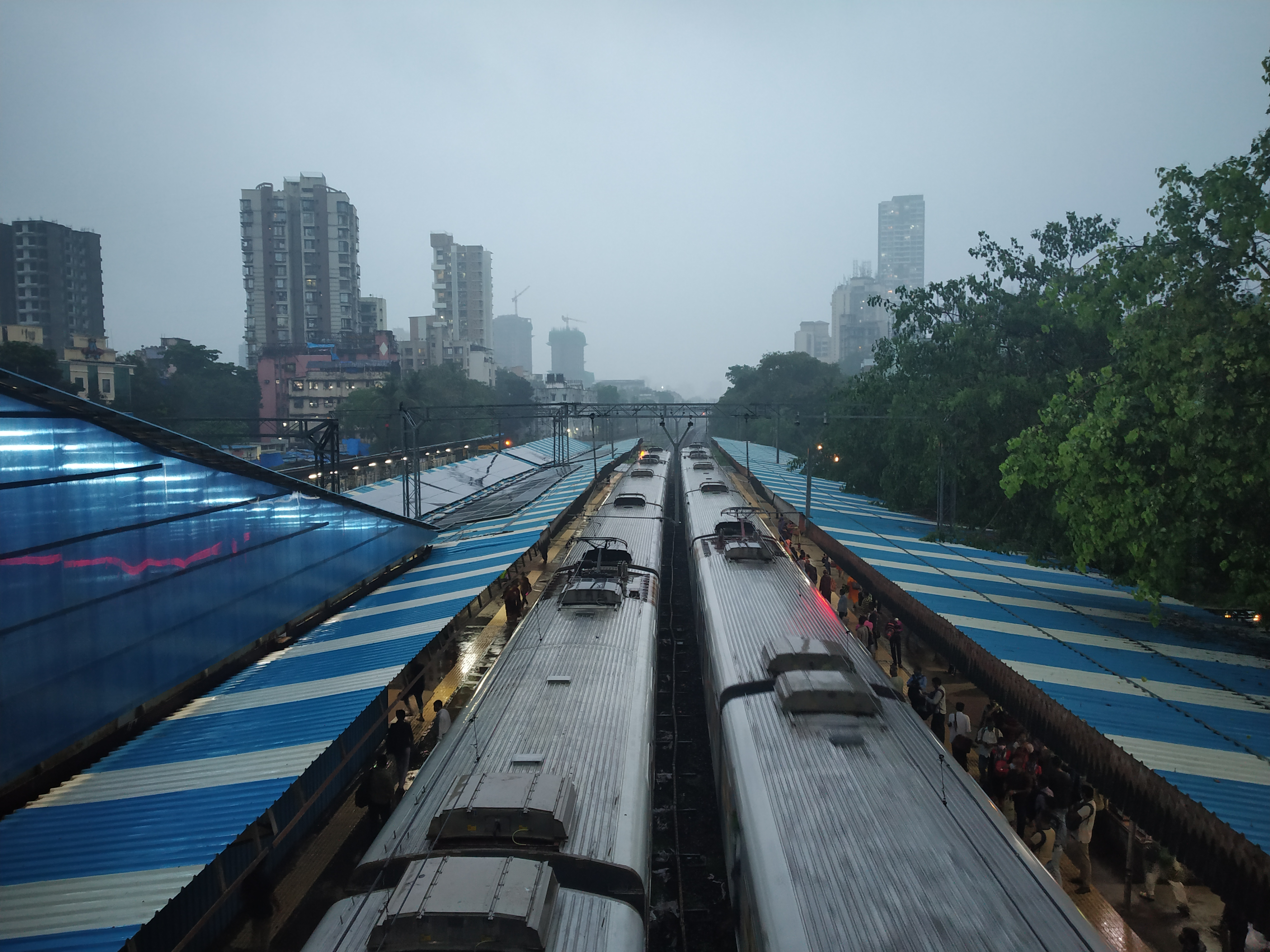
Dahisar Railway Station from Pedestrian Bridge

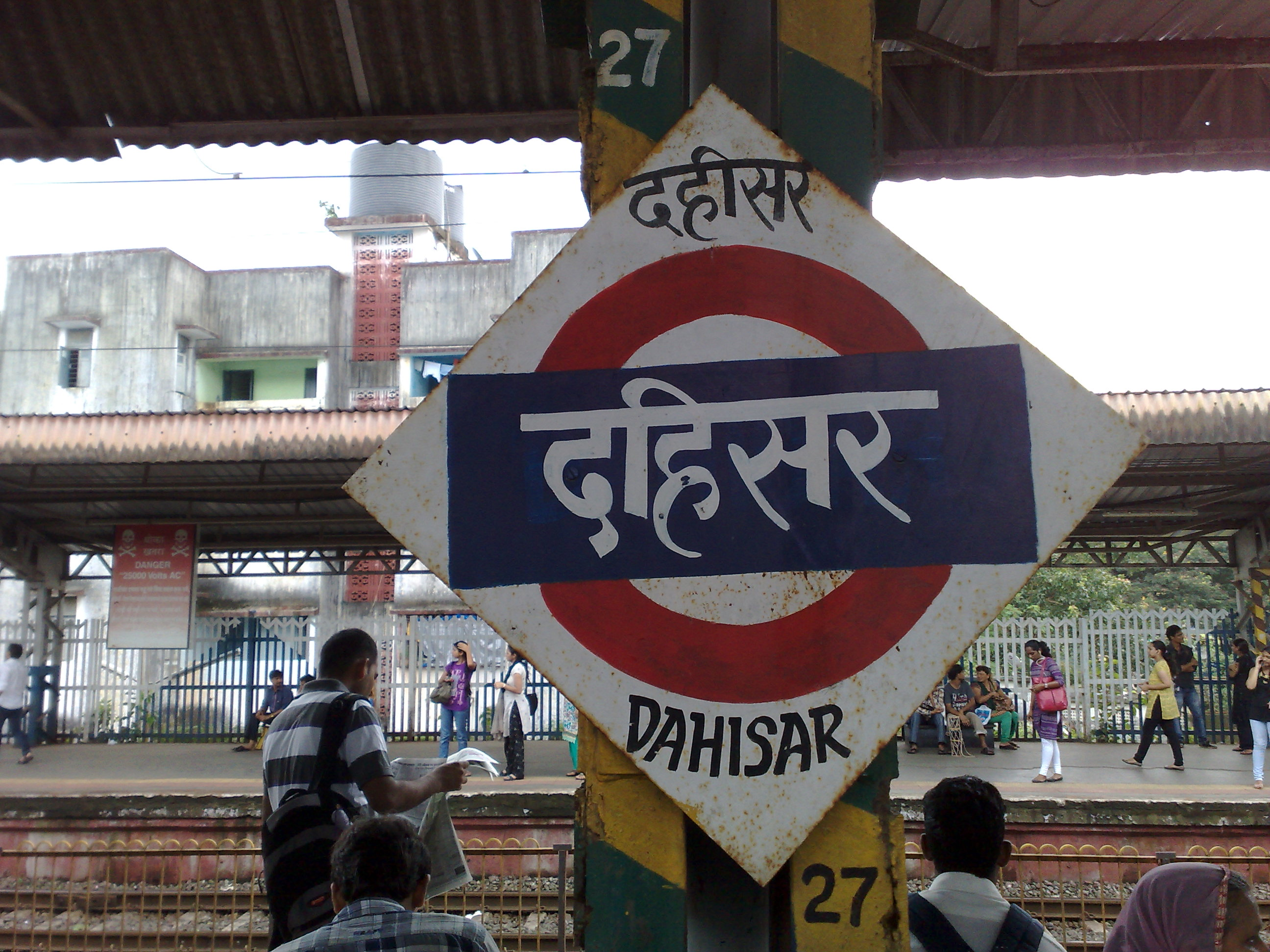
Dahisar Railway station

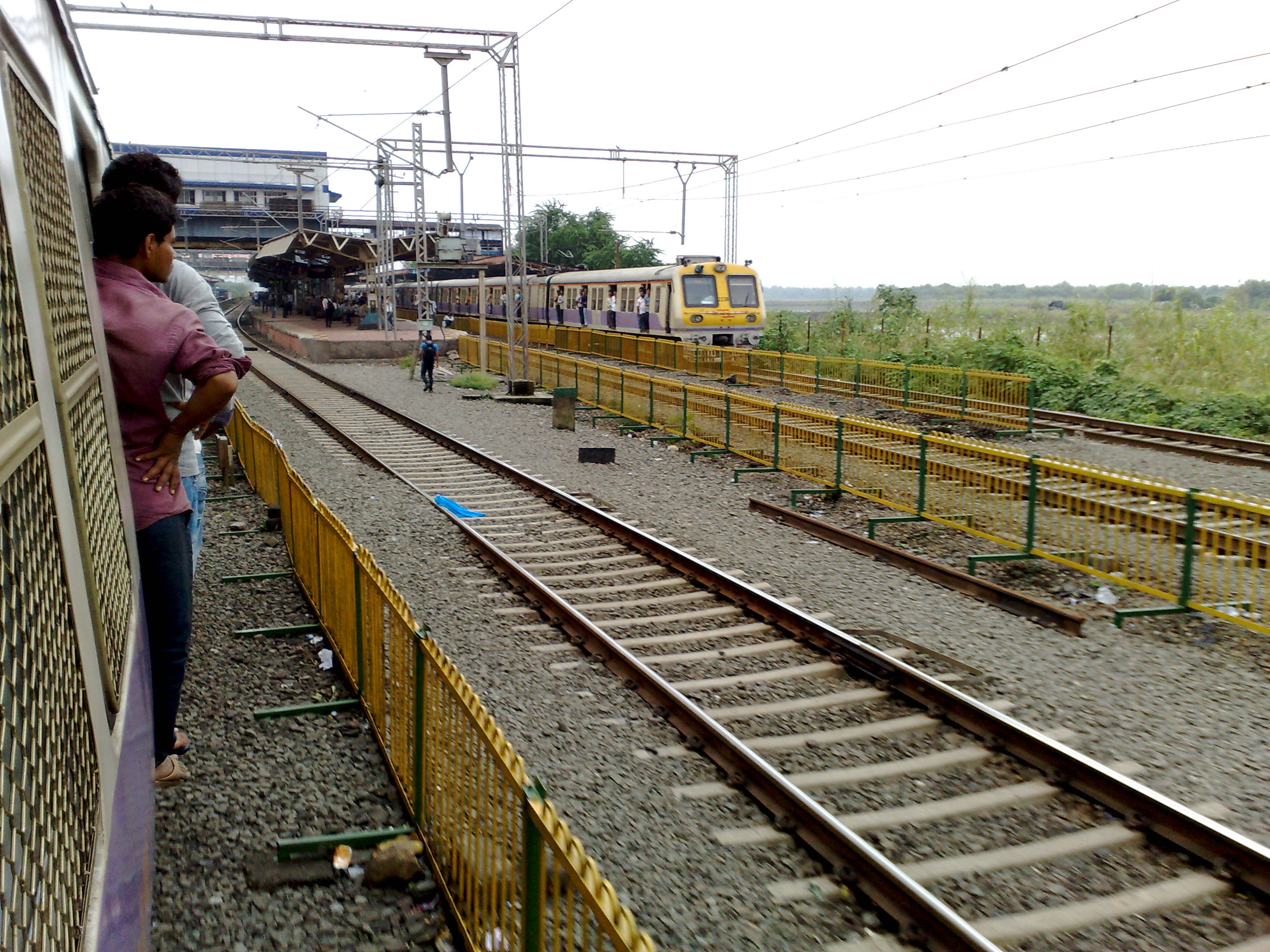
On approach to Dahisar railway station
