= Mira Road railway station =

Railway Station in Maharashtra, India

Mira Road

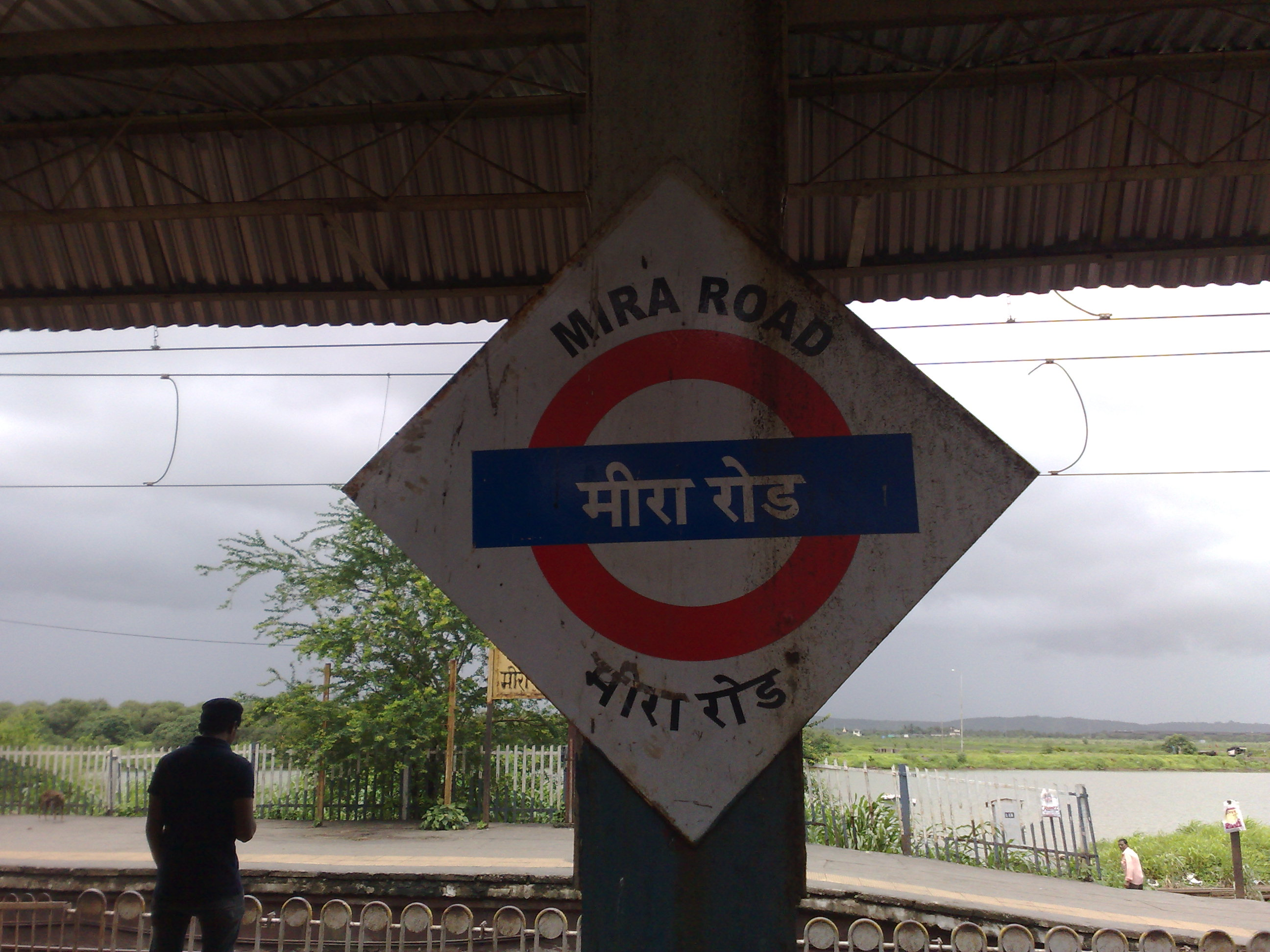
- Mira Road station signboard

General information
- Location: Mira Road
- Coordinates: 19.2799°N 72.8561°E
- System: Mumbai Suburban Railway station
- Owner: Ministry of Railways, Indian Railways
- Line: Western line
- Platforms: 4
- Tracks: 4
- Connections: BEST Transport, MBMT Transport, TMT Transport

Construction
- Structure type: Standard on-ground station
- Parking: Yes

Other information
- Status: Active
- Station code: MIRA
- Fare zone: Western Railways

Passengers
- ▼ (2015) 1,30,000 ▲ (2016) 1,77,000

Services
Preceding station	Mumbai Suburban Railway	Following station
Dahisar towards Churchgate	Western line	Bhayandar towards Dahanu Road
Route map
Location
- Location within Mumbai Location within India

Mira Road (Pronunciation: [miɾaː]; station code: MIRA) is a passenger railway station, located at Mira Road, a suburb in the Western Suburbs of Mumbai, India.

The station is served by three bus services, namely the BEST Transport, MBMT Transport and TMT Transport buses, serving the areas of Western Suburbs, Mumbai City District, Thane, Navi Mumbai and Mira Bhayandar.

It is one of the crowded railway stations during peak hours on the Western Line of Mumbai Suburban Railways.

== Development ==
In 2015, MMRDA authorities had implemented that Mira Road station will be developed along with other railway stations from the Central and Harbour lines of the Mumbai Suburban Railway with the installations of escalators, footover bridges and elevators.

== Gallery ==
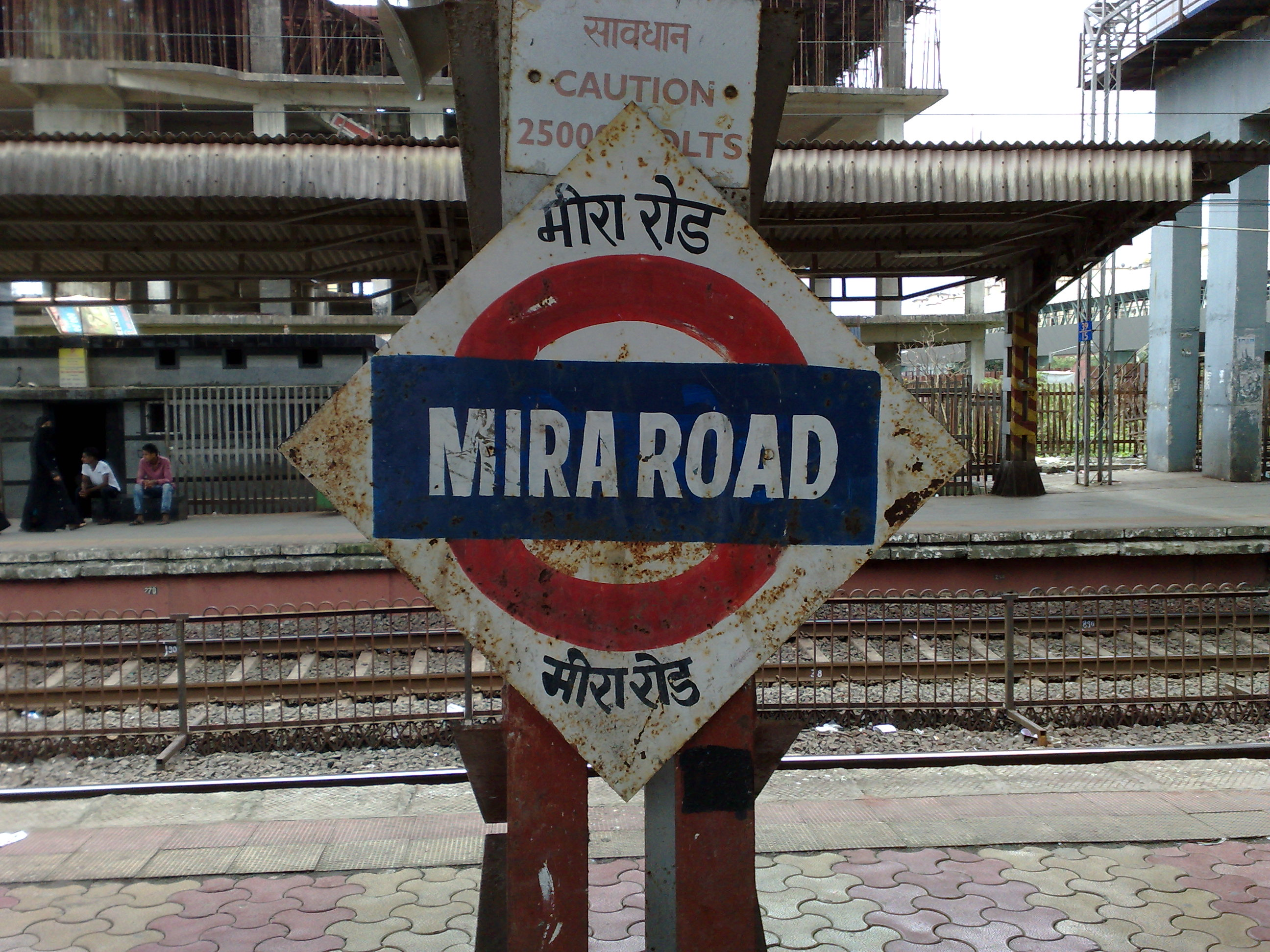
Mira Road station Platform Board

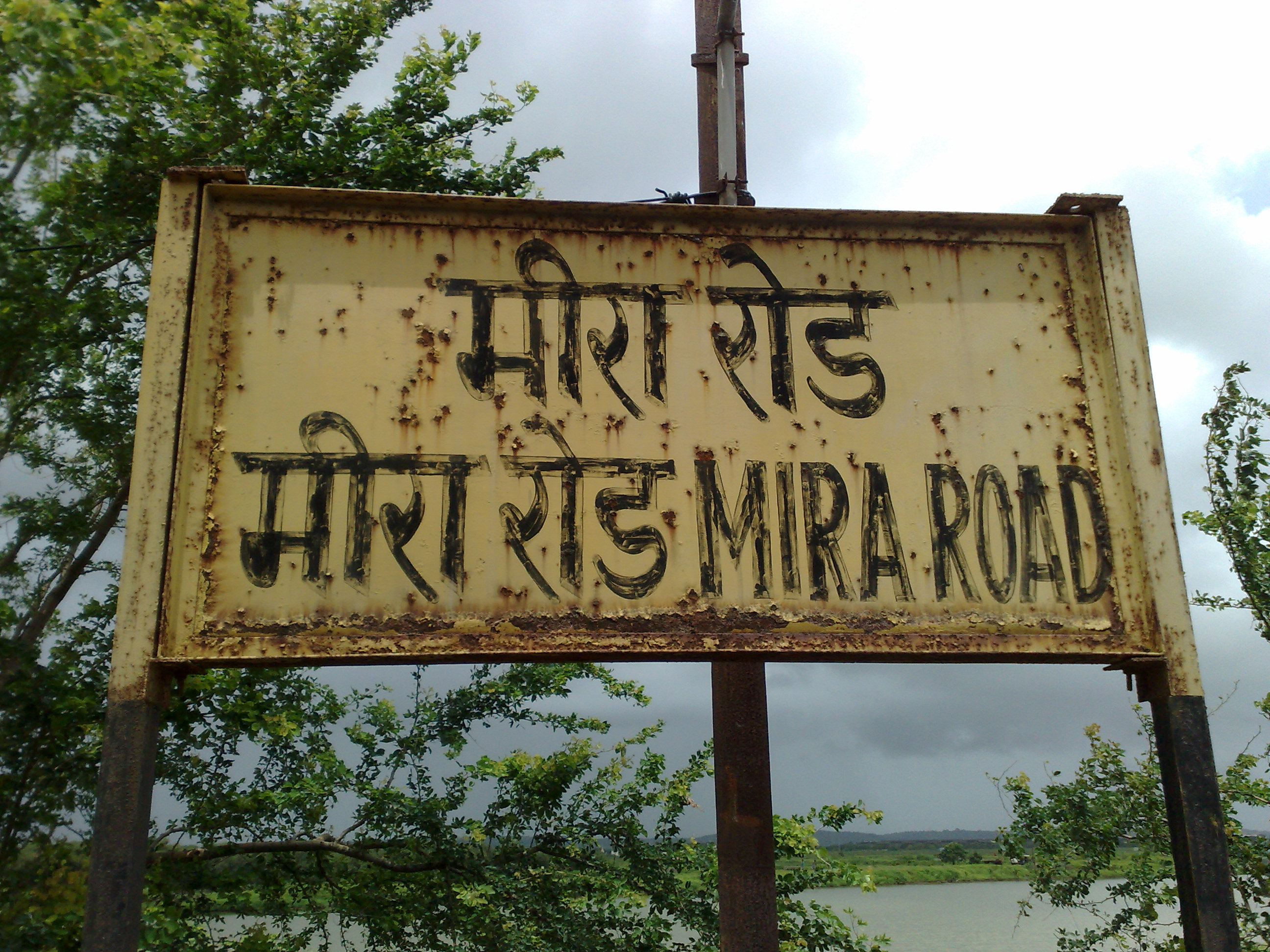
Mira Road station Station Board
