= Sat Tad Masjid =

Mosque in Mandvi, Mumbai, India

Sat Tad Mosque
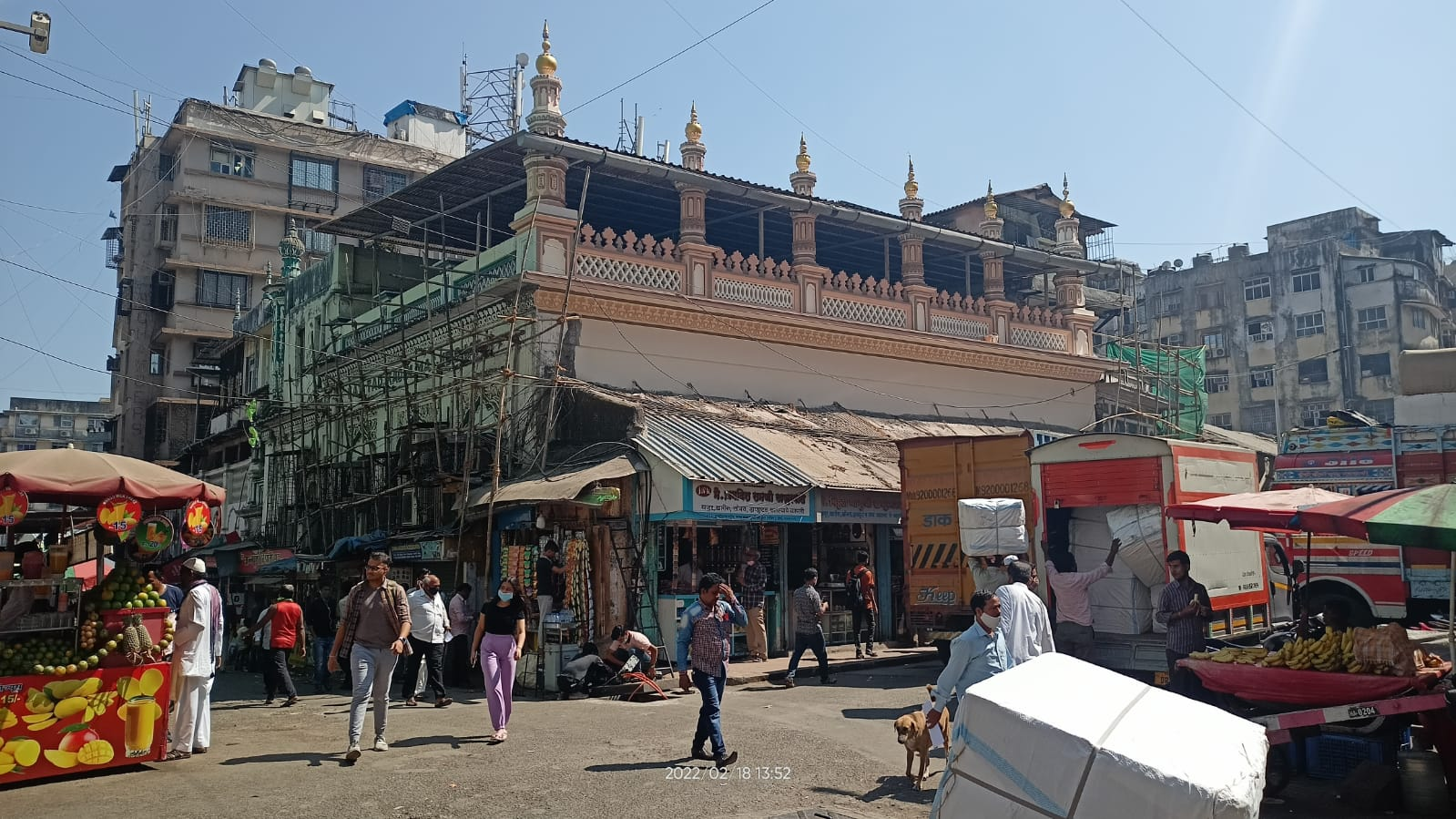
- The mosque in 2022

- Location of the mosque in Mumbai

Religion
- Affiliation: Islam
- Ecclesiastical or organizational status: Mosque
- Status: Active

Location
- Location: Mandvi, Mumbai, Maharashtra
- Country: India
- Interactive map of Sat Tad Mosque
- Coordinates: 18°57′10″N 72°50′16″E

Architecture
- Type: Mosque architecture
- Completed: c. 18th century

The Sat Tad Masjid is a mosque situated in the Mandvi division of Mumbai, in the state of Maharashtra, India. The mosque abuts the Masjid railway station.

== Etymology ==
The Sat Tad Masjid means "mosque of the seven brab trees" (Borassus flabellifer), referring to a group of palms that grew in its vicinity.

== History ==
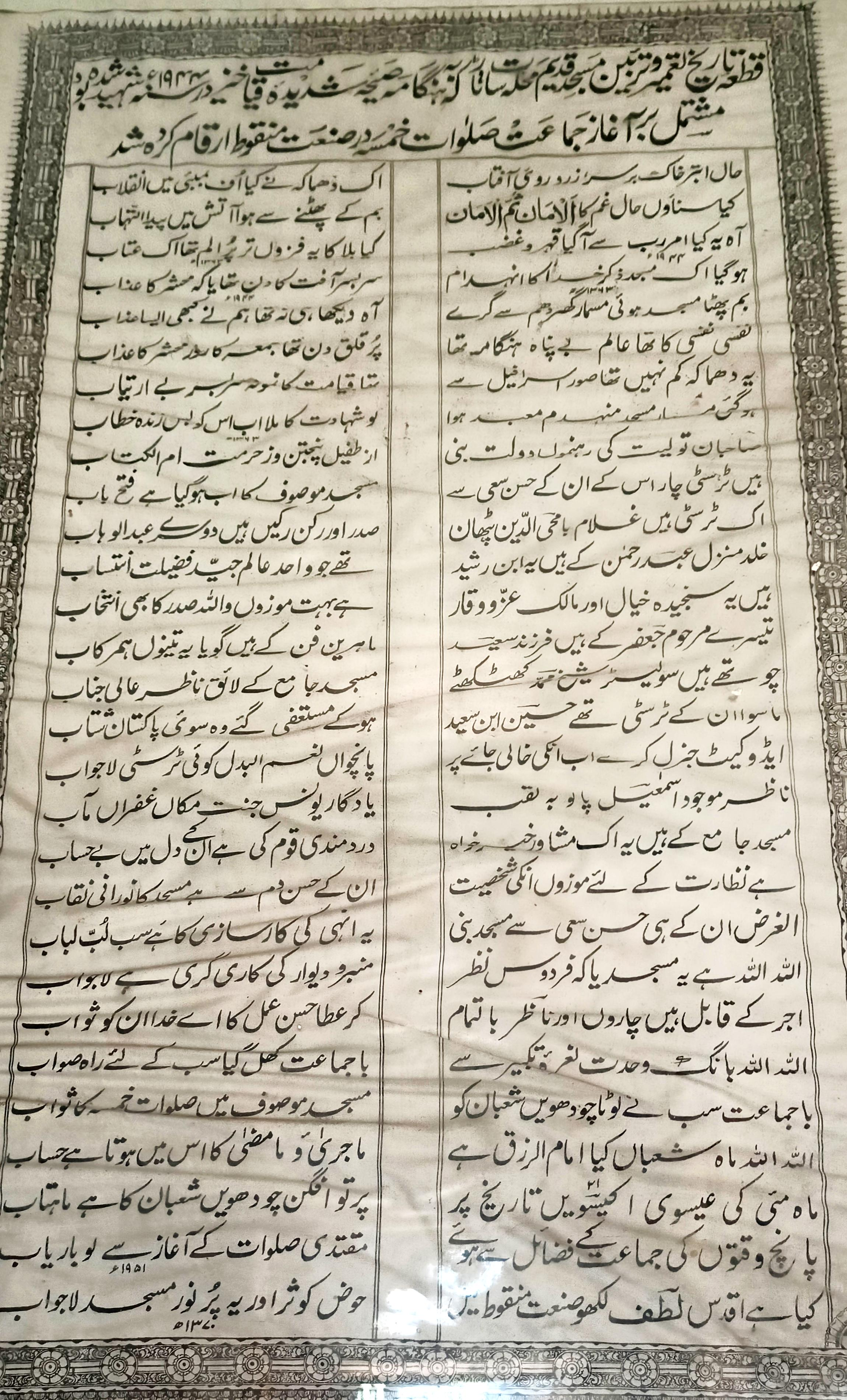
The panel displayed outside the mosque

The Sat Tad Masjid was used as the Friday mosque of Mumbai (formerly Bombay) from 1770 to 1802, when the present Jama Mosque at Janjikar Street near Crawford Market was under construction. The mosque had an annual income of Rs. 11,000 in the year 1901.

According to a panel affixed outside the Sat Tad Masjid recording the history of the mosque, the explosion that occurred in Victoria Dock in 1944 caused extensive damage to the mosque's structure, necessitating its reconstruction. As per unpublished records of the masjid, Regular congregational prayers again commenced in 1951.

== Administration ==
The mosque is administered by the Sat Tad Kadim Mosque Trust. In 1944, the Trust was granted a lease by the Collector of Bombay over 86.96 square metres (936.0 sq ft) of land adjoining the mosque.

== See also ==
- Islam in India
- List of mosques in India
