= 1948 Junagadh referendum =

February 1948 plebiscite in the princely state of Junagadh

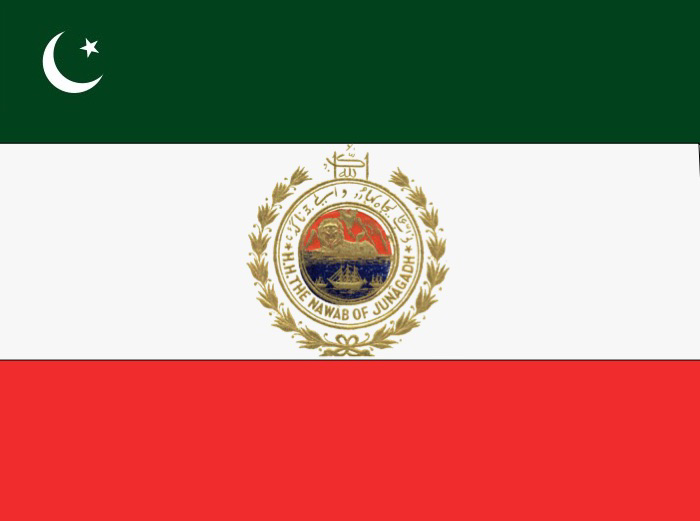
- 20 February 1948
- Should Junagadh join India or Pakistan?

Results
Choice	Votes	%
Join India	222,174	99.94%
Join Pakistan	130	0.06%
Valid votes	222,304	100.00%
Invalid or blank votes	0	0.00%
Total votes	222,304	100.00%
Registered voters/turnout	232,891	95.45%

The 1948 Junagadh referendum (also referred to as the Junagadh plebiscite) was a public vote held on 20 February 1948 in the erstwhile princely state of Junagadh, located in the Kathiawar peninsula of modern-day Gujarat, India. The referendum was organized to determine whether the state would permanently join the Dominion of India or the Dominion of Pakistan. The vote followed months of political and military crisis triggered by the Muslim ruler's decision to accede to Pakistan against the geographic reality of the state and the wishes of its overwhelming Hindu majority. Out of the total 232,891 registered voters, 222,304 (95.45%) voted in the referendum. The referendum resulted in a decisive 222,174 (99.94%) mandate in favour of integration with India, while only 130 (0.06%) voted in favour of Pakistan.

== Background ==
During the Partition of India in August 1947, the 565 semi-autonomous princely states were released from British paramountcy under the provisions of the Indian Independence Act 1947. Rulers were advised to accede to either the Dominion of India or the Dominion of Pakistan based on geographic contiguity and the wishes of their populations.

=== Demographics and geography ===
At the time of partition, Junagadh occupied a critical position on the Kathiawar peninsula. It had a population of approximately 700,000 people, of whom roughly 80% to 82% were Hindu, while the remaining population was predominantly Muslim. Geographically, Junagadh was entirely surrounded by other princely states that had already acceded to India, sharing no land border with Pakistan. Its only access to Pakistan was via sea routes linking the port of Veraval to Karachi, located roughly 300 nautical miles away.

=== Accession crisis ===
On 15 September 1947, the ruler of Junagadh, Nawab Mahabat Khan III, formally signed the Instrument of Accession to Pakistan. The government of Pakistan, led by Governor-General Muhammad Ali Jinnah, accepted the accession on the same day. The decision provoked immediate protests from the Dominion of India, which argued that the accession violated principles of popular sovereignty and geographic contiguity, fearing it would destabilize the entire Kathiawar region.

== Popular revolt and the Arzi Hukumat ==
The local population vehemently opposed the Nawab's decision to join Pakistan. On 25 September 1947, a large assembly of Junagadhi citizens met in Bombay (now Mumbai) and formed a provisional government-in-exile known as the Arzi Hukumat (People's Government). The movement was led by Samaldas Gandhi, a nephew of Mahatma Gandhi.

Supported tacitly by the Indian state, the forces of the Arzi Hukumat, alongside local volunteers, launched an armed rebellion and an economic blockade. They cut off trade, communications, and vital supply lines to Junagadh, quickly seizing control of several outlying towns and villages within the state boundaries.

== Indian intervention (November 1947) ==
By late October 1947, the internal situation in Junagadh had completely deteriorated. Faced with economic ruin and growing local insurrections, Nawab Mahabat Khan III fled Junagadh for Karachi, Pakistan, taking his family, state treasury assets, and his personal dogs.

The Nawab left his Dewan (Prime Minister), Shah Nawaz Bhutto, to manage the state administration. On 8 November 1947, facing imminent financial and administrative collapse, Bhutto wrote an official letter to the Indian Regional Commissioner in Rajkot, N. M. Buch, formally inviting the Government of India to intervene and take over the administration to prevent total chaos. The Government of India accepted the invitation, and Indian armed forces and civil administrators assumed administrative control of Junagadh on 9 November 1947.

== Referendum ==
Although India held physical control of the territory, Prime Minister Jawaharlal Nehru and Deputy Prime Minister Sardar Vallabhbhai Patel insisted on validating the integration through a democratic plebiscite. This was intended to legally solidify the integration and counter Pakistan's diplomatic protests at the United Nations Security Council.

The vote was scheduled for 20 February 1948. To maintain administrative transparency, the Indian government appointed a senior judicial officer, C. B. Nagarkar (ICS), to supervise the polling process.

=== Results ===
Out of 201,457 registered voters across the state, 190,870 cast their ballots. The final official count recorded a nearly unanimous decision to join India. Concurrently, separate plebiscites were held in five adjoining vassal principalities (including Mangrol, Manavadar, Bantwa, Babariawad, and Sardargarh) which yielded similar results.

Region / Territory	Total Ballots Cast	Votes for India	Votes for Pakistan
Junagadh State Proper	190,870	190,779	91
5 Vassal Principalities	31,434	31,395	39
Total	222,304	222,174	130

The overall percentage of voters who chose integration with India stood at approximately 99.94%.

== Aftermath and legacy ==
Following the official declaration of the referendum results, Junagadh was formally integrated into the Indian Union. On 15 February 1949, the state was merged into the newly formed United State of Saurashtra. Following subsequent administrative reorganizations of independent India, Saurashtra was merged into Bombay State in 1956, and eventually became a permanent district of Gujarat following the States Reorganisation Act on 1 May 1960.

=== Historical perspectives ===
Nationalist Indian historians generally characterize the referendum as a triumph of democratic self-determination and popular sovereignty over absolute monarchical decree. Conversely, Pakistani authorities and certain revisionist historians have argued that the plebiscite was flawed, asserting that it was conducted under the duress of an intense economic blockade and an ongoing military occupation by Indian security forces, which effectively pre-empted a truly free vote.

== See also ==
- 1947 Sylhet referendum
- Annexation of Junagadh
- Integration of princely states
