= Gate of Mercy =

Gate of Mercy may refer to:

- Gate of Mercy Synagogue
- Golden Gate (Jerusalem)
