= Jama Mosque, Mumbai =

Mosque in Mumbai, Maharashtra, India

Jama Mosque
- जामा मशीद
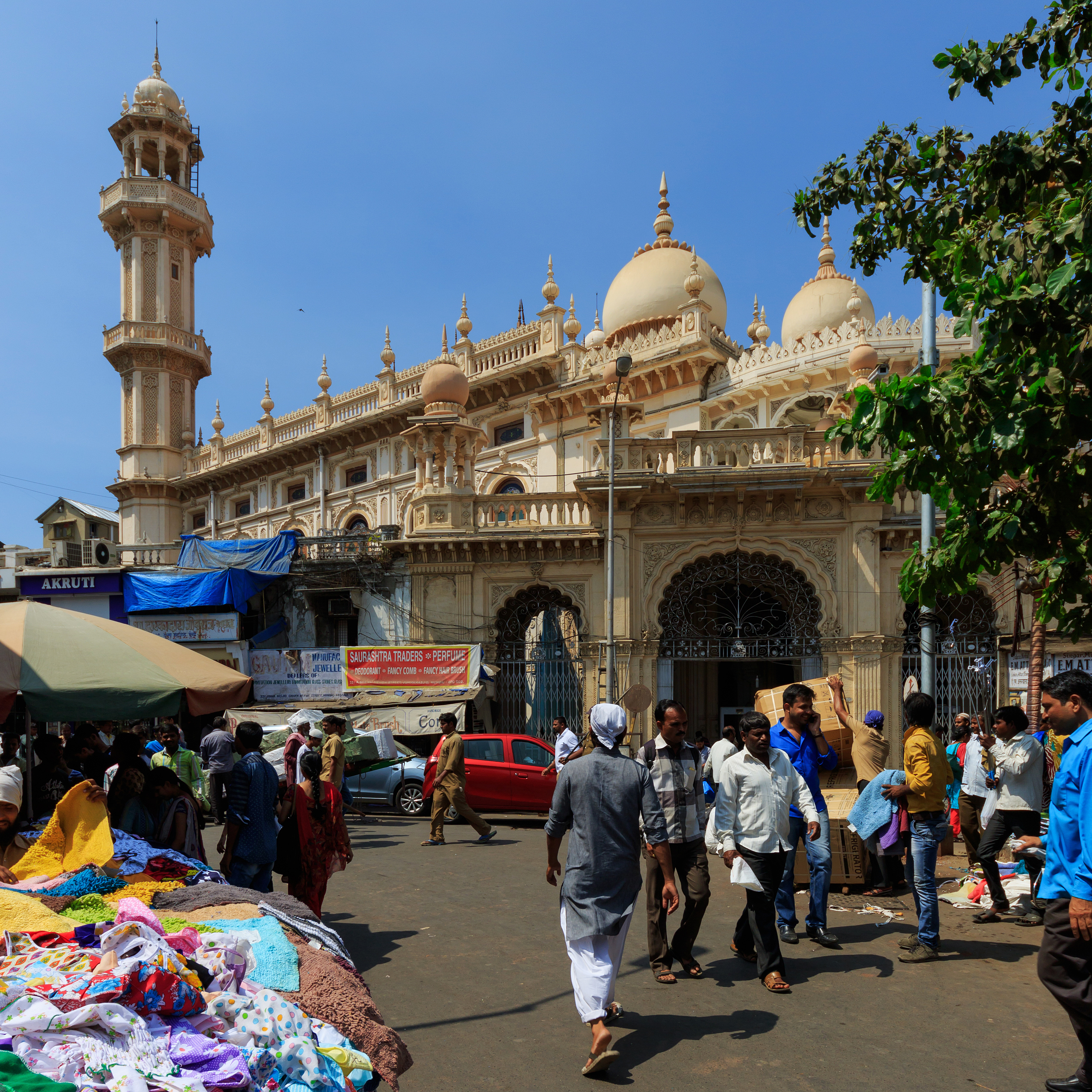
- The mosque, in 2016

- Location of the mosque in Mumbai

Religion
- Affiliation: Sunni Islam
- Ecclesiastical or organisational status: Friday mosque
- Status: Active

Location
- Location: Kalbadevi, South Mumbai Mumbai, Maharashtra
- Country: India
- Coordinates: 18°56′57″N 72°49′56″E

Architecture
- Type: Mosque architecture
- Style: Indo-Islamic
- Groundbreaking: 1775
- Completed: 1802 (reservoir); 1874 (mosque)

Specifications
- Dome: Two (maybe more)
- Minaret: One (maybe more)
- Materials: Brick, stone, marble

The Jama Masjid (Marathi: जामा मशीद) is a Sunni Mosque, located in the Kalbadevi, near Crawford Market South Mumbai, Maharashtra, India. The mosque was completed in stages during the 19th century, in the Indo-Islamic architecture.

The Muslim community of Mumbai possesses 89 mosques, of which eight are affiliated with the Bohra tradition, two with the Khoja tradition, one with the Mughals, and the remaining with the Sunni tradition.

== History ==
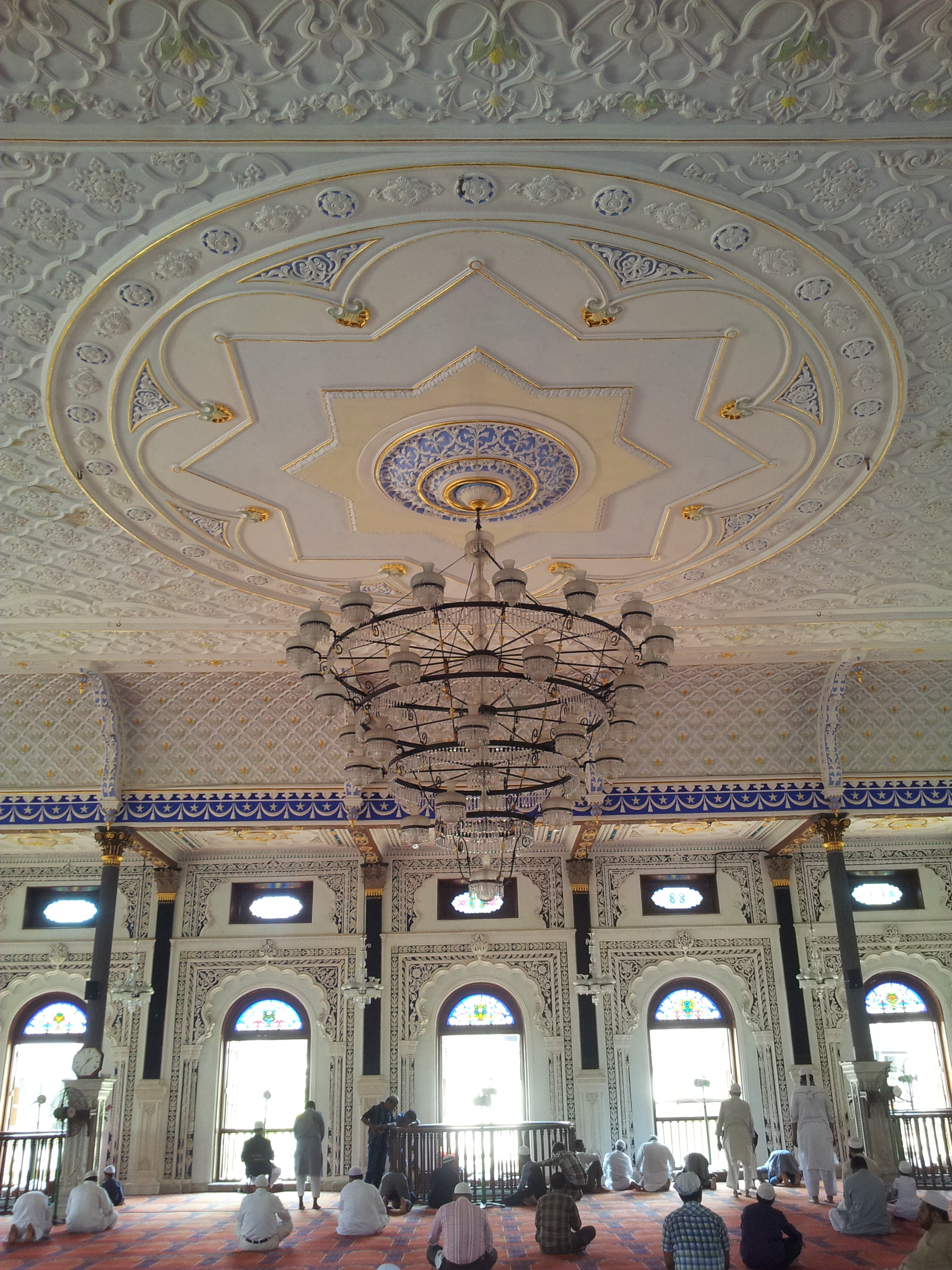
The chandelier inside the mosque

In the eighteenth century, a large water reservoir was situated at this site in the midst of gardens and open land, and belonged to a Konkani Muslims merchant trading in Goa and Kozhikode. In c. 1775, the merchant agreed to the erection of a mosque at this site on condition that the water tank was preserved.

The construction started in 1775 with the raising of foundations on the tank. Objections were raised by neighbours that delayed construction until 1778. More disputes arose with illegal construction activities to its west and south. Finally, the Governor of Bombay, Philip Meadows Taylor, decided in favour of the mosque authorities. The mosque was completed in 1217 AH (1802/1803 CE), as derived from the chronogram Jahaz-i- Akhirat, "The ship of the world to come", which contains an allusion to the fact that it was constructed on the tank.

A one-storey building was erected over the tank, and formed the original nucleus of the present Jama Mosque. A top floor was added in 1814, with the philanthropic support of Mohammad Ali Roghay, a prominent Konkani merchant.

Sat Tad Masjid was used as the Friday mosque of Mumbai from 1770 to 1802, when this mosque was under construction.

== Architecture ==
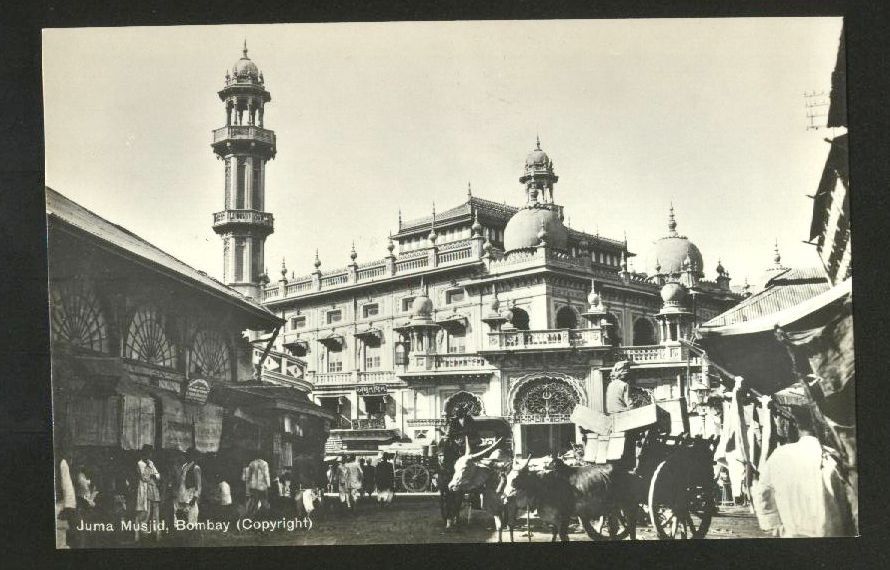
The mosque in the late 19th century

The Jama Mosque is a quadrangular structure of brick and stone, completed in the Indo-Islamic style, encircled by a ring of terrace roofed and double storied buildings, the ground floors of which are let out as shops. The chief or eastern gate of the mosque leads directly across an open courtyard to the ancient tank, which is now furnished with masonry steps and embankments. The tank was built in 1893, and contains approximately 3.0 metres (10 ft) of water, fed by springs at the bottom. The tank contains gold and silver fish and a few turtles. The tank is used for wudu, and modern sanitation facilities are also available.

From the depth of the tank rise sixteen black stone arches, constructed in 1874, which support the whole fabric of the mosque, the upper storey upheld by five rows of wooden pillars, each of which contains a receptacle for sacred books. The arches in the tank were built in 1874 at a cost of Rs. 75,000; while other noteworthy additions to the premises were the large windows in the north, east, and south sides constructed in 1898, and the madrasa in 1902, at a cost of Rs. 20,000.

== Administration ==
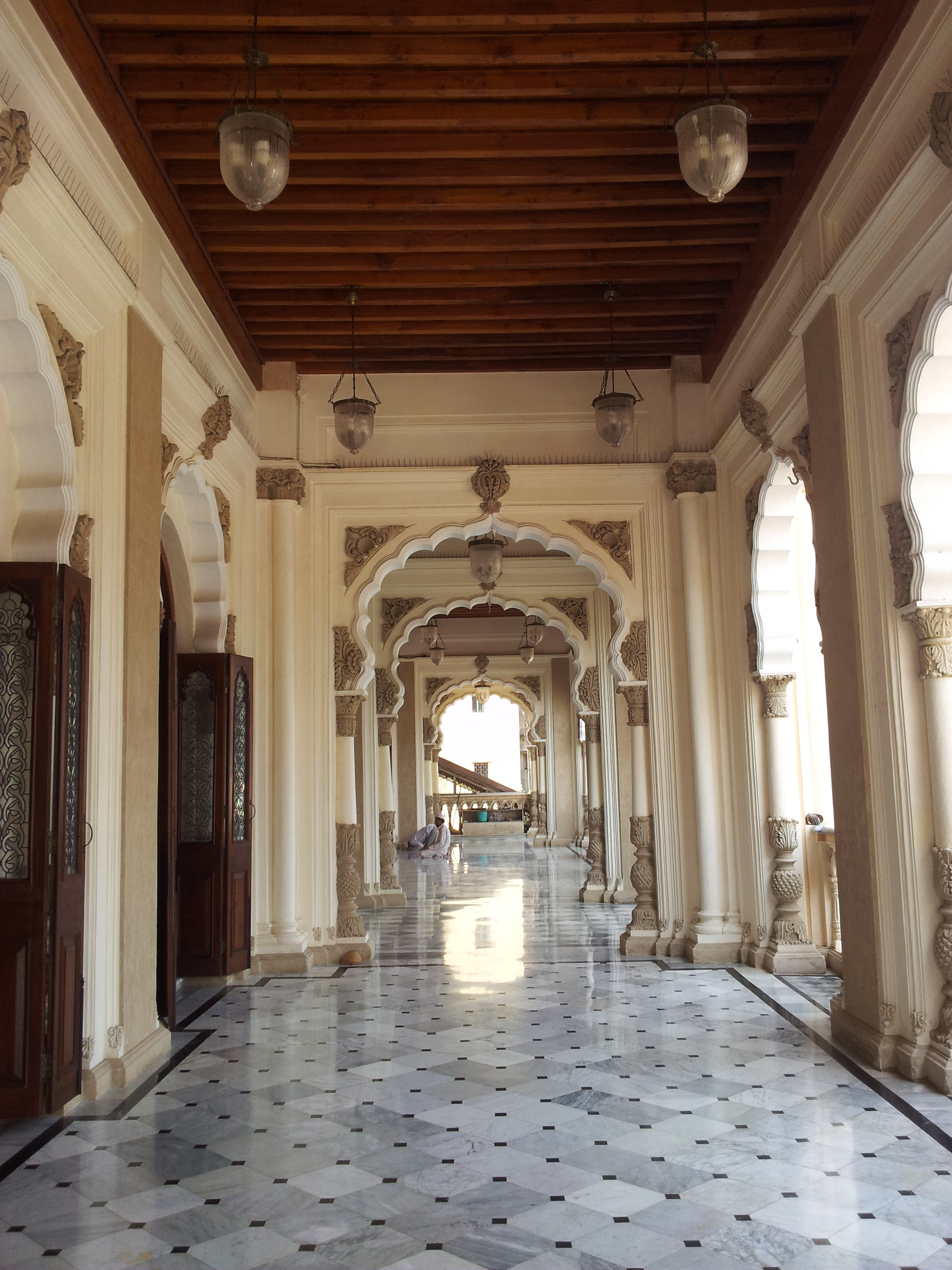
Marble floor interior

Spread across more than 0.40 hectares (1 acre), the two-storey quadrangular mosque at Janjikar Street is run by the Juma Masjid of Bombay Trust. Built in 1775, it is home to a digitised library with rare manuscripts from as early as the 1890s. It is said to be one of the main mosques for Sunnis and is managed by the Konkani Muslims. It follows the Shafie (شافعى) madhab (school) to which most Konkni Muslims adhere to.

In accordance with a scheme framed by the High Court in 1897, the management of its properties and affairs vests in a board of eleven directors, triennially elected by Konkani Muslim Jamat, while the executive functions are delegated to a Nazir, appointed by the board. The staff of the mosque includes am Imam or prayer leader, an assistant imam, a Bangi (muezzin) and assistant Bangi whose duty is to summon the devotees to prayer, and several subordinated.

== Location ==
The Jama Masjid is located in Janjikar Street, Kalbadevi near 'Dhobi Talao' area, in Mumbai. To the west of the mosque is Zaveri Bazar (the main jewellery market); and to the mosque's east lies Abdul Rehman Street. The nearest train stations are Marine Lines to the west and Masjid Bunder to the east. Access is also available via buses that stop at Crawford Market.

== See also ==
- Islam in India
- List of mosques in India
