= Acacio Gabriel Viegas =

Portuguese medical practitioner (1856–1933)

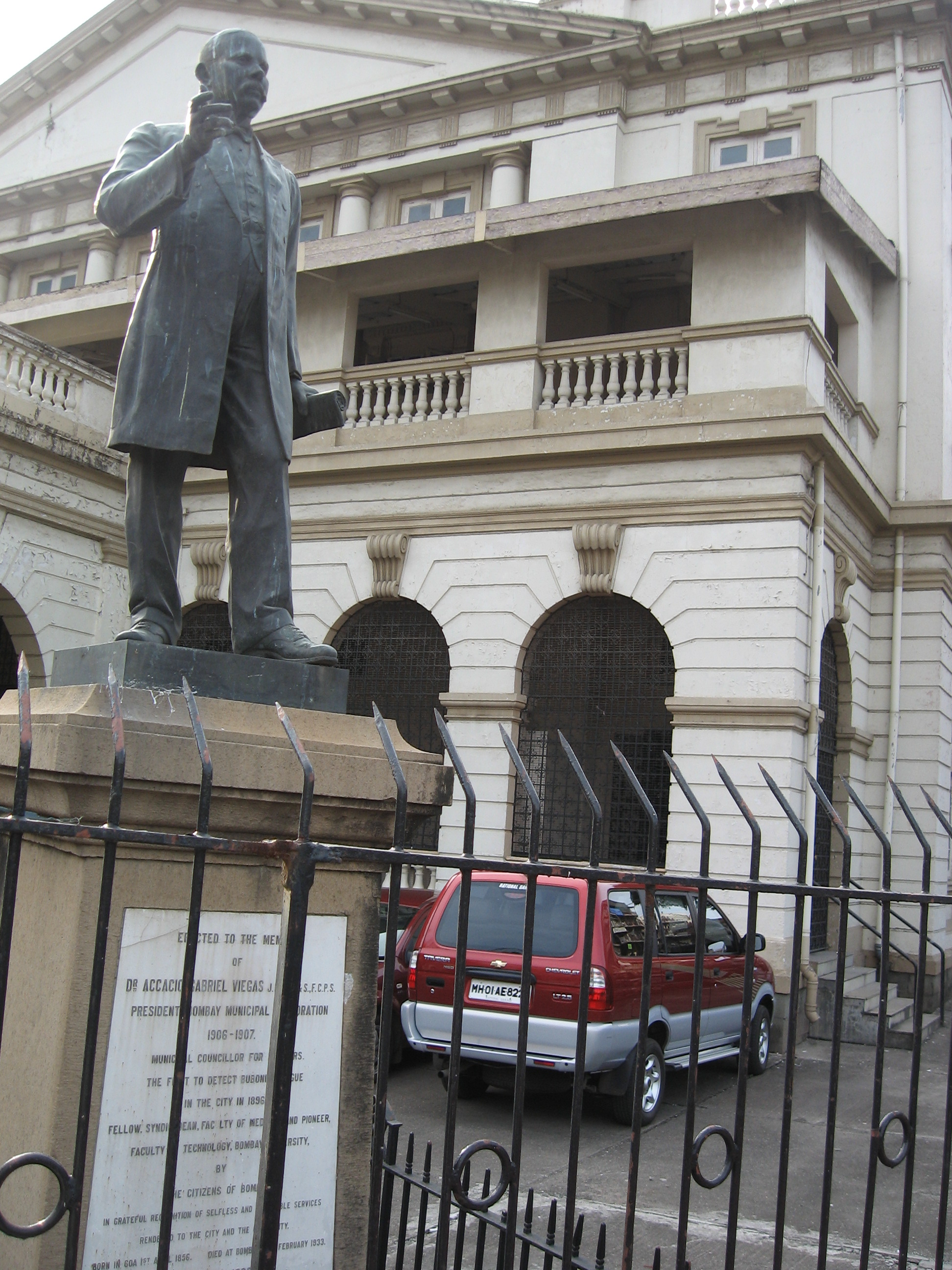
- Statue of Viegas near Metro Adlabs, India
- Born: 1 April 1856; Arpora, Goa, Portuguese India
- Died: 21 February 1933 (aged 76); Bombay, British India
- Education: University of Bombay
- Occupations: Physician, Councillor
- Employer: Bombay Municipal Corporation
- Known for: Discovery of bubonic plague in Bombay
- Title: President of the Bombay Municipal Corporation
- Term: 1888–1908

Acacio Gabriel Viegas (1 April 1856 – 21 February 1933) was a Portuguese physician who was credited with the discovery of the outbreak of bubonic plague in Bombay, in 1896. His timely discovery helped save many lives in the city and was credited with the inoculation of 18,000 residents. He was also the president of the Bombay Municipal Corporation.

== Early life ==
Acacio Gabriel Viegas was born on 1 April 1856 in Arpora, Portuguese Goa. He enrolled in the Grant Medical College, securing a First Class at the L.M. & S. degree examination held in 1880. Viegas then set up practice at Mandvi in the south Bombay area.

== As president ==
Not satisfied with serving the public only through medicine, he successfully contested the civic election from 1888 until 1907. In 1906 he became the President of the Municipal Corporation, enjoying the distinction of being the first native Christian to do so.

He was an active member of the Standing Committee and the Improvement Trust. He then focused his attention to improving the living conditions of the city's poor and down-trodden. He also tried to minimise the increases of public utility costs. As president, Viegas promoted medical relief and introduced compulsory free education.

Viegas was also a member of the Bombay University Syndicate, and was the pioneer of the Faculty of Scientific Technology. He also introduced Portuguese into the syllabus and supported the creation of special colleges for women. He was also an examiner in Medicine at the degree level and Foundation-Fellow of the College of Physicians and Surgeons.

== Role in the epidemic ==
In 1896, a mysterious disease hit the city in the Nowroji Hill slums. The disease spread rapidly affecting many city residents and became an epidemic. Those in the medical field were puzzled by this disease which saw a mass exodus from the city. The city's commerce was badly hit, and the flourishing textile industry was grounded.

Viegas correctly diagnosed the disease as bubonic plague and tended to patients at great personal risk. He then launched a vociferous campaign to clean up slums and exterminate rats, the carriers of the plague.

To confirm Viegas' findings, four teams of independent experts were brought in. With his diagnosis proving to be correct, the Governor of Bombay invited W M Haffkine, who had earlier formulated a vaccine for cholera, do the same for the epidemic. Haffkine's vaccine saved thousands of lives with Viegas personally inoculating around eighteen thousand residents.

== Legacy ==
After his death in 1933, a life-size statue of him was erected in the Cowasji Jehangir Hall opposite Metro Cinema on his birth centenary in 1956, by the Governor of Bombay Presidency, Harekrushna Mahtab, as a tribute to the services rendered to the city. A street in the Dhobitalao area is also named after him.
