= Bombay City Improvement Trust =

Trust

The City of Bombay Improvement Trust (BIT) was created on 9 In December 1898, in response to the Bombay plague epidemic of 1896, the Bombay Chamber of Commerce approached Governor Lord Sandhurst to ensure “the destruction of insanitary [sic] property and the thorough cleansing of the city and suburbs" after the 1897 International Sanitary Conference in Venice threatened to quarantine ships from Bombay.

The BIT was modeled on contemporary English and Scottish town-planning institutions and "possessed the authority not only to build housing, but also to demolish slums and widen roads, and improve sanitation, particularly in the “problematic” working-class neighborhoods."

== Organisation ==
British colonial officials constructed the BIT's board to "guarantee the basic framework of property rights." The board was dominated by members favourable to commercial and industrial interests; four members represented the Bombay Municipal Corporation (BMC), and the Bombay Millowners’ Association, the Bombay Chamber of Commerce and Port Trust.

== Activities ==
The CIT widened roads in the central, crowded, parts of the town. A new east-west road, the Princess Street, was constructed to channel the sea air into the centre of the crowded residential areas. The north-south Sydenham Road (now Mohammedali Road) was also constructed with this end in view.

The Dadar-Matunga-Wadala-Sion suburban development was started in 1899 with the express purpose of relieving congestion to the south. Well-laid out plots, with mixed land-use patterns marked these sections. Completed in 1900, access to these parts were through the newly completed Mohammedali Road.

== See also ==
- Bombay plague epidemic
