= Bombay plague epidemic =

Bubonic plague epidemic in India from 1896

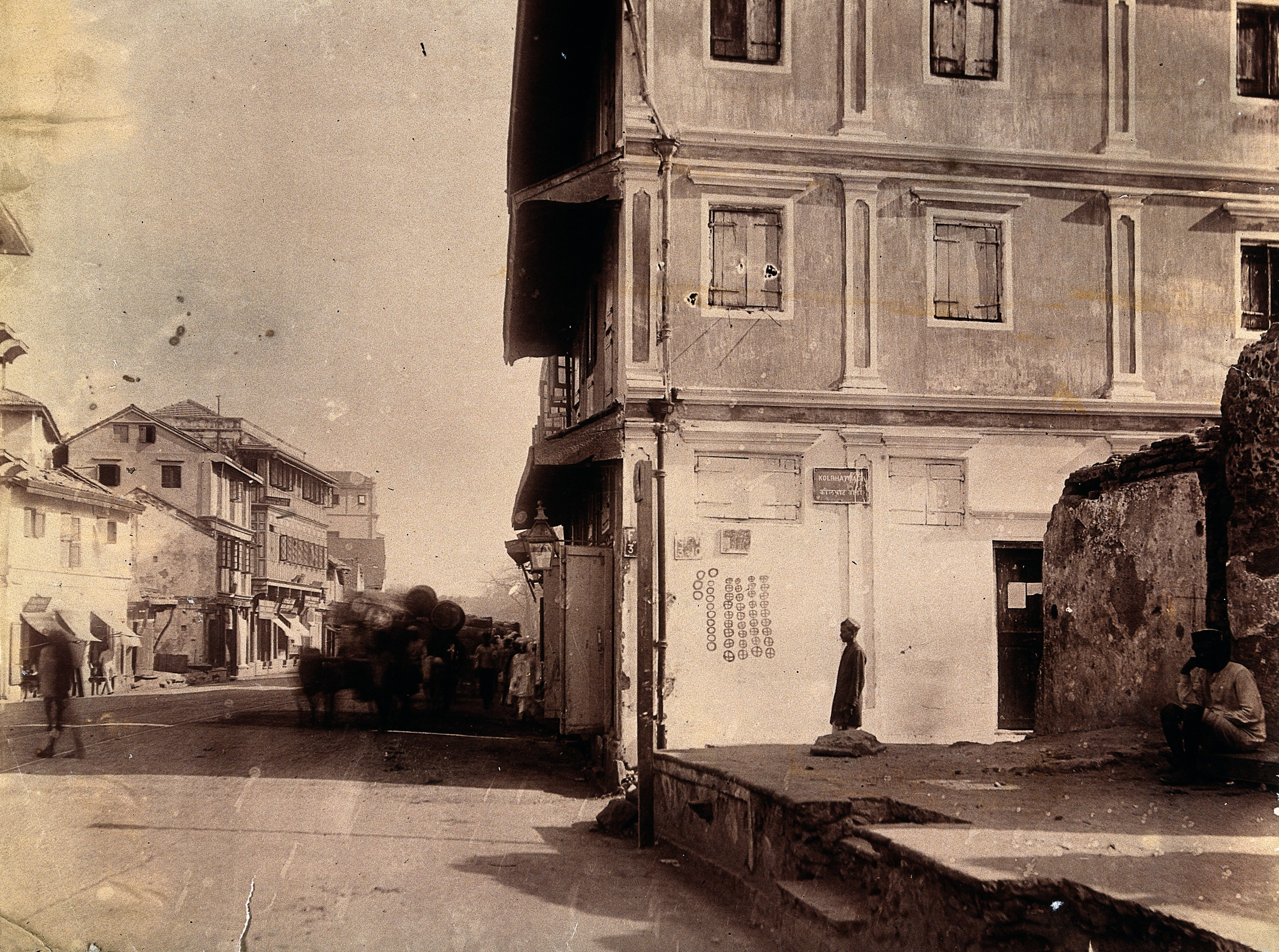
- A plague house on Kalbadevi Road, Bombay. Plain circles on the wall represent plague deaths.
- Disease: Bubonic plague
- Location: Bombay (present-day Mumbai), India
- First outbreak: September 1896
- Index case: September 1896
- Confirmed cases: March 1897
- Deaths: 20,000 (estimated by March 1897)

The Bombay plague epidemic was a bubonic plague epidemic that struck the city of Bombay (present-day Mumbai) in British India in the late nineteenth century. The plague killed thousands, and many fled the city, leading to a drastic fall in the population of the city. In September 1896, Bombay's municipal administration declared the presence of bubonic plague in the city. The administration's protocols were ineffective, which furthered the spread, and were also restrictive and aggressive, which caused violent public outrage. By January 1897, half the population fled to the countryside.

== Background and Causes ==
The bubonic plague's arrival in Bombay in the summer of 1896 was part of the third plague pandemic, a deadly pandemic that had originated in China in the 1850s and continued to afflict many parts of the globe until the 1950s.

Bombay was made vulnerable by the rapid growth of the city's commerce, which led to a large influx of workers. In the 1891 census, the population of Bombay was counted to be 820,000. Most of the immigrant workers (over 70%) lived in chawls. The city services were not geared towards the well-being of the working class and various diseases were endemic to the slums. Even before the pandemic occurred, these conditions caused the Indian subcontinent to have a general mortality rate of 4,130 per 100,000 people between 1871 and 1921. Workers in cotton mills, as one of the major social fractions within the city, and as the bedrock of its trade, played a major role in the making of this crisis. The difficulties of sanitary administration arise from the rapidity of decomposition of organic matter, the density of population, and the primitive habits of the people, which have never been brought in line with the necessities of a closely inhabited town having in certain wards a density of 700 per acre.

== Detection ==
In September 1896, the first case of bubonic plague was detected in Mandvi by Dr. Acacio Gabriel Viegas. It spread rapidly to other parts of the city, and the death toll was estimated at 1,900 people per week through the rest of the year. By March 1897, municipal authorities believed around 20,000 people had died. The epidemic peaked in early 1897, and had a case fatality rate of 75–85%.

Many people fled from Bombay at this time, and in the census of 1901, the population had actually fallen to 780,000. Viegas correctly diagnosed the disease as bubonic plague and tended to patients at great personal risk. He then launched a vociferous campaign to clean up slums and exterminate rats, the carriers of the fleas which spread the plague bacterium. To confirm Viegas' findings, four teams of independent experts were brought in. With his diagnosis proving to be correct, the Governor of Bombay invited W M Haffkine, who had earlier formulated a vaccine for cholera, to do the same for the epidemic.

Those who could afford it tried to avoid the plague by moving out of the city. Jamsetji Tata tried to open up the northern suburbs to accommodate such people. However, the brunt of the plague was borne by mill workers as they could not afford to leave.

In 1900, the population mortality rate from plague was about 22 per thousand. In the same year, the corresponding rates from tuberculosis were 12 per thousand, from cholera about 14 per thousand, and about 22 per thousand from various other illnesses classified as "fevers". The plague was fearsome only because it was apparently contagious. More mundane diseases took a larger toll. In the city of Bombay, the epidemic had caused 10,606 deaths in the winter of 1896.

== Responses ==
Authorities in Bombay, working to British Governor William Mansfield, were initially reluctant to acknowledge that the plague had reached their city, and may have been motivated by wanting to preserve Bombay's status as a trading hub. Viceroy of India, Lord Elgin, feared that harsh medical measures may cause a violent backlash against the British authorities. But as the plague worsened, Lord Hamilton, Secretary of State for India, challenged Viceroy Elgin's cautious approach. By the spring of 1897, due to threats of a trade embargo with India if the plague spread to Europe, it was agreed that strict rules would be put in place to curb the epidemic. The British Colonial Government passed the Epidemic Diseases Act of 1897 and the Bombay Government established the Bombay Plague Committee. Brigadier General W.F. Gatacre of the Indian Army was put in charge of the committee, which gave him martial authority and license for his use of police and military cordons to conduct house searches. On top of this, the city destroyed slum dwellings and flushed drains with 3 million gallons of carbolic acid and saltwater daily. Those suspected to have the plague were forcibly removed from their homes and isolated in hospitals and detention camps. To protect trade, the government enacted strict medical inspections and quarantines at train stations, ports, and key trading points. The administration dealt with civil insurrections to these responses by deploying soldiers, horses, and lathi sticks, while keeping heavy artillery in reserve.

Civilian Resistance

These aggressive controls angered the local population as these methods violated caste boundaries, purdah customs, and traditional funeral rites. Male European doctors carried out physical inspections on women, which caused massive public outcry. Mandatory post-mortem examinations, and the requirement of wrapping those infected with the plague in quicklime or perchloride of lime, desecrated the body, making their traditional funeral rites impossible. Over 90% of people in hospitals died, which led people to believe that hospitals cause death and led to the question, "Why is the Sarkar trying to kill us all?" to echo around Bombay. Hundreds of thousands of Bombay residents fled for rural districts, which paralyzed the city's economy and forced cotton mills to close. Those who stayed fought against segregation in many ways: they smuggled the sick to safe areas, hid them in lofts, broke into plague camps to retrieve dying relatives, and performed clandestine burials inside residential buildings. There was also more overt and violent demonstrations of resistance. In October 1896, around 1,000 mill workers protested segregation by stoning the Arthur Road Hospital. Later, in March 1898, Muslim weavers in Byculla rioted to prevent a 12 year old girl from going to the hospital, setting buildings on fire and wounding a magistrate in the process.

Political Consequences

The obtrusive actions taken by the British escalated existing tensions and acted as a catalyst for Indian nationalism. In Pune, the Epidemic Diseases Act of 1897 gave Plague Commissioner Walter C. Rand the power to form a "Plague Triumvirate," which used military force to carry out home inspections, force hospitalizations and quarantines, destroy property, and bypass local Indian leaders. B.G. Tilak, a prominent Hindu nationalist, used his newspaper to condemn this committee and their methods. Tensions grew until the Chapekar brothers assassinated Rand on June 22, 1897, and Tilak was blamed for inciting violence. However, this backfired on the British; his imprisonment for sedition turned him into a martyr. The British recognized that imprisoning Tilak and forcing segregation was a political catastrophe and risked a full scale revolution, and such the British abandoned the policy after 1898. The British colonial administration stopped forcing those suspected to have the plague into hospitals and instead offered voluntary immunization using Haffkine's vaccine.

Medical Research and Controversies

Early breakthroughs from people like Dr. Acacio Gabriel Viegas and bacteriologist Nusserwanji Surveyor were met with disdain and marginalization from the British colonial power. In the first year of the plague, a research laboratory was set up at the JJ Hospital. Operating out of a laboratory known as "Room 000," Russian bacteriologist Waldemar Haffkine developed the first successful vaccine for the plague. It moved in 1899 to the Government House in Parel under the directorship of Haffkine, marking the beginning of the Haffkine Institute. As international medical professionals arrived to study the outbreak, debates rose about who should receive treatment. Indian infectious disease specialist Nusserwanji Choksy, who documented over 4,000 plague cases, clashed with Almroth Wright of the British Plague Commission over the ethics of these clinical trials, specifically debating whether to only give the Lustig vaccine to everyone or to withhold it from alternating cases to act as a control group. Choksy argued that the vaccine should be given to everyone capable of benefitting from it, as the death rate from the plague was 90%.

Urban Infrastructure Reforms

On 9 December 1898, the City of Bombay Improvement Trust (BIT) was created. The Trust was tasked with "making new streets, opening out crowded localities, reclaiming lands from the sea to provide room for the expansion of the city, and the construction of sanitary dwellings for the poor." It was entrusted with the job of creating a healthier city. One of the measures taken by the BIT was the building of roads, like Princess Street and Sydenham Road (now Mohammedali Road), which would channel the sea air into the more crowded parts of the city. The Trust also implemented anti-epidemic building regulations, such as the "63.5 degree light angle rule," which determined the distance between a building and its boundary wall to allow improved light and ventilation. Many of the iconic Art Deco-style buildings that adorn present-day Mumbai's streets were built in accordance with these plague regulations.
