= Gate of Mercy Synagogue =

Synagogue in Mumbai, India

- Hebrew: שער הרחמים
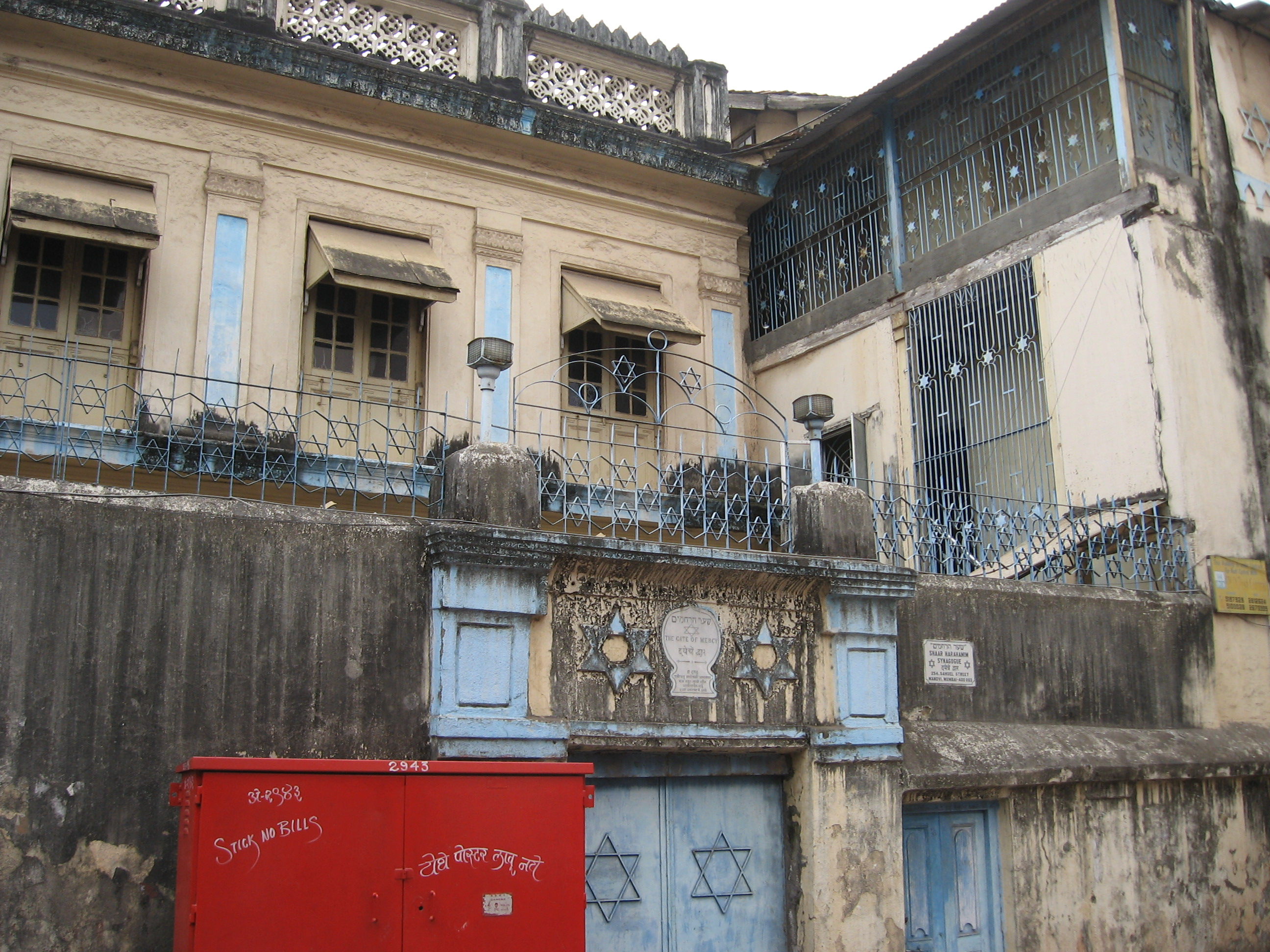
- The synagogue in 2008

- Location of the synagogue in Mumbai

Religion
- Affiliation: Judaism
- Rite: Nusach Sefard
- Ecclesiastical or organizational status: Synagogue
- Year consecrated: 1796
- Status: Active

Location
- Location: 254 Samuel Street, South Mumbai, Konkan, Maharashtra
- Country: India
- Interactive map of Gate of Mercy Synagogue
- Coordinates: 18°57′08″N 72°50′11″E

Architecture
- Funded by: Samaji Hasaji Divekar
- Established: c. 1750s (as a congregation)
- Completed: 1796 (near CSMT); 1860 (Mandvi)

Specifications
- Capacity: 300 worshipers
- Interior area: 8 by 16 m (26 by 52 ft)

The Gate of Mercy Synagogue (Hebrew: שער הרחמים), also known, since its centenary in 1896, as the Shaar Harahamim Synagogue, and known colloquially as Juni Masjid, is a synagogue, located at 254 Samuel Street, in South Mumbai, in the division of Konkan, in the state of Maharashtra, India.

Built in 1796, it is the oldest synagogue in Mumbai. The synagogue was built by Samaji Hasaji Divekar (also known as Samuel Ezekiel), a Bene Israeli, near CSMT in South Mumbai. The synagogue was later rebuilt and moved to the present location at Mandvi in 1860. In the eighteenth and nineteenth centuries, the area was inhabited by a small but thriving Jewish community.

== History ==
According to historical accounts, Samuel Divekar and his brother Issac, served in the British East Indian army as officers. During the Anglo-Mysore Wars, they were captured by the Mysore king Tipu Sultan. They were about to be condemned to death, when Tipu Sultan asked what caste they belonged to. The brothers mentioned that they were Bene Israel. Having never heard of the group, Tipu was about to condemn them to death, when his mother intervened, mentioning that she had heard of the name of the 'caste' in the Koran. Tipu, a devout Muslim spared the two brothers and later exchanged them for a prisoner swap with the British. The two brothers returned to the British enclave of Bombay (now renamed to Mumbai) and built the synagogue in thanksgiving.

On 2 April 1919, the synagogue convened a public meeting of Bene Israeli on the subject of Zionism. Over 350 community members attended, and many were sympathetic to the cause of setting up of an independent homeland of Palestine though the debate sparked off deep debate on the subject.

The local appellation of the synagogue, Juni Masjid, lends itself to the nearby Central railway station, Masjid Bunder. Despite a fall in numbers, the synagogue maintains active services such as a 6 am service. It serves a congregation of about a hundred members daily. The synagogue is also featured on heritage and religious tours of the city.

== Synagogue building ==
The synagogue is a symmetrical, two-story structure finished in chunam, or plaster of polished lime and sand, which has been painted. The structure can accommodate 300 members, and on High Holy Days it had large congregations attending. However, on Shabbat, not more than 50 attended services. There is also a mikvah (bath) present nearby for the religious to purify themselves.

== See also ==
- History of the Jews in India
- List of synagogues in India
