= Marine Lines railway station =

Railway Station in Maharashtra, India

Marine Lines
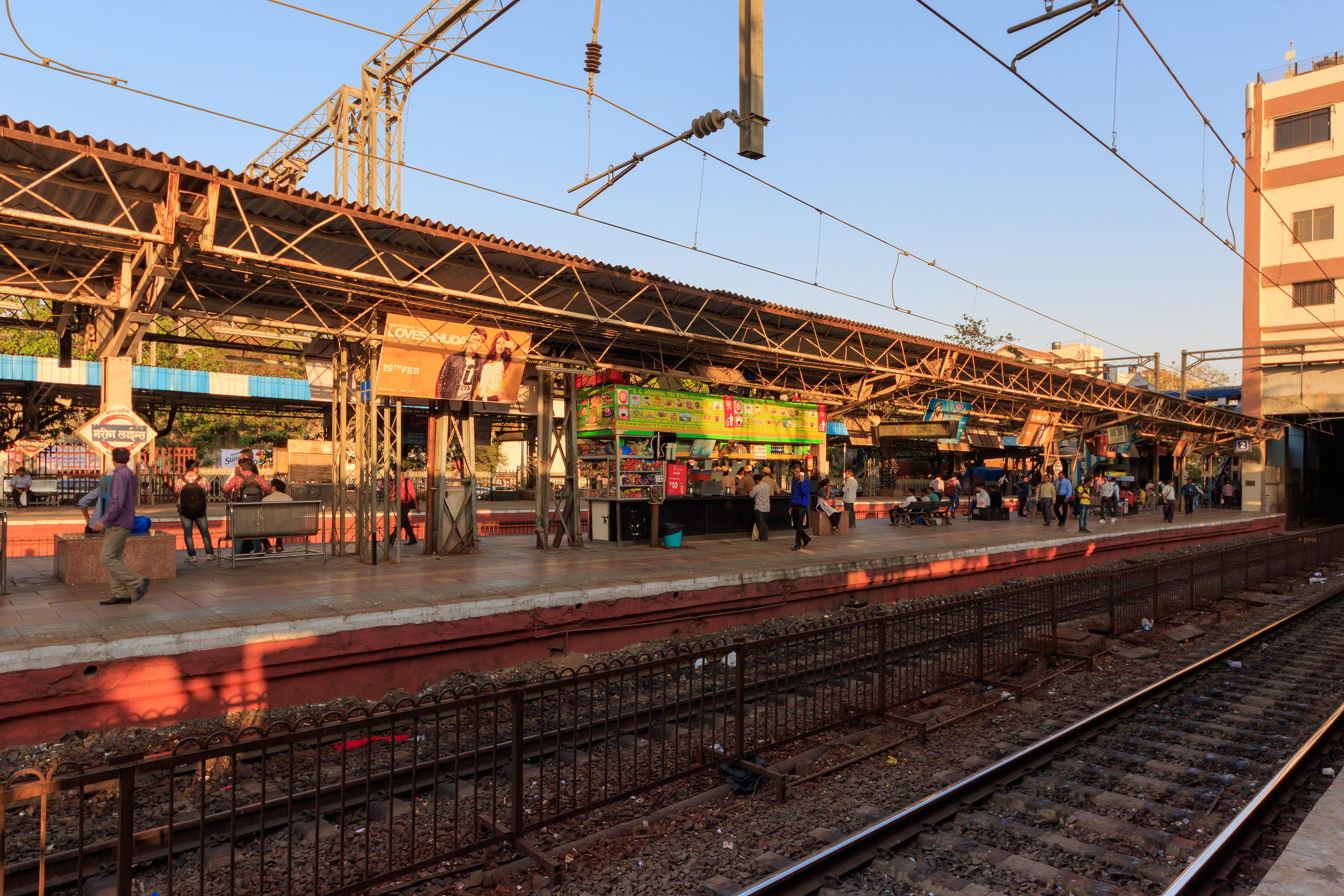
- Mumbai Marine lines railway station (March 2016)

General information
- Coordinates: 18°56′41″N 72°49′28″E
- System: Mumbai Suburban Railway
- Owner: Indian Railways
- Line: Western Line
- Platforms: 4
- Tracks: 4

Construction
- Structure type: At-grade
- Parking: No
- Cycle facilities: No

Other information
- Status: Active
- Station code: MEl
- Zone(s): Western Railway zone
- Division(s): Mumbai WR

History
- Opened: 1869

Services
Preceding station	Mumbai Suburban Railway	Following station
Churchgate Terminus	Western line	Charni Road towards Dahanu Road
Route map
Location
- Location within Mumbai

Marine Lines (station code: MEL) is a railway station on the Western line of the Mumbai Suburban Railway in Marine Lines, South Mumbai, Maharashtra. Almost all the north-bound fast trains stop at Marine Lines. Southbound fast locals stop at Marine Lines, but skip the station during the evening peak hours (17:00 to 20:00).

Near the station there is a Muslim cemetery and a municipal crematorium, Chandanwadi. The stairs of north end of the station pass by the cemetery. The commuters use the cemetery path to reach the station quickly. Also adjoining the station is the famous Marine Drive flyover, which is the only link to Marine Drive over the tracks from Princess Street beginning to end. The south end exit climbs up to Princess Street which leads to Kalbadevi Road. It was featured in the film Jaane Bhi Do Yaaro.

== History ==
The Marine Lines station at one point of time was south of the current day location, near the church of Our Lady of Seven Dolours. At one point of time, trains used to terminate at Marine Lines. Before the Colaba station was closed down in the 1930s, Marine lines used to be the third stop on the railway line.

When plans were being drawn for the proposed extension of the BB&CIR line to Colaba in early 1860s, the Government of Bombay raised a proposal for a passenger station at Marine Lines, and a goods station north of this station. It was taken into consideration that Marine Lines would be the closest point at which the rail line would approach the Native Town at locales like Girgaon, Kalbadevi, etc. After the Backbay Reclamation of 1860s, a section to Marine Lines was finally opened on 19 June 1869.

When the 1873-built Colaba Station began to be crowded in terms of rail traffic, it was thought that this could be tackled by providing an additional siding accommodation at Marine Lines, and by making it a terminus for all long-distance passenger trains. However, this was not implemented, as in 1888, a government referred committee stated this was not being a satisfactory solution, as it would take up more land for the railways, which would be objected to by the public, for restricting the already scarce area used for recreation. Instead, it was proposed that the existing Colaba station be enlarged, and therefore, a plot of land was given to the BB&CI Railway near Wodehouse Bridge, and a station was completed there by 7 April 1896.

== Gallery ==
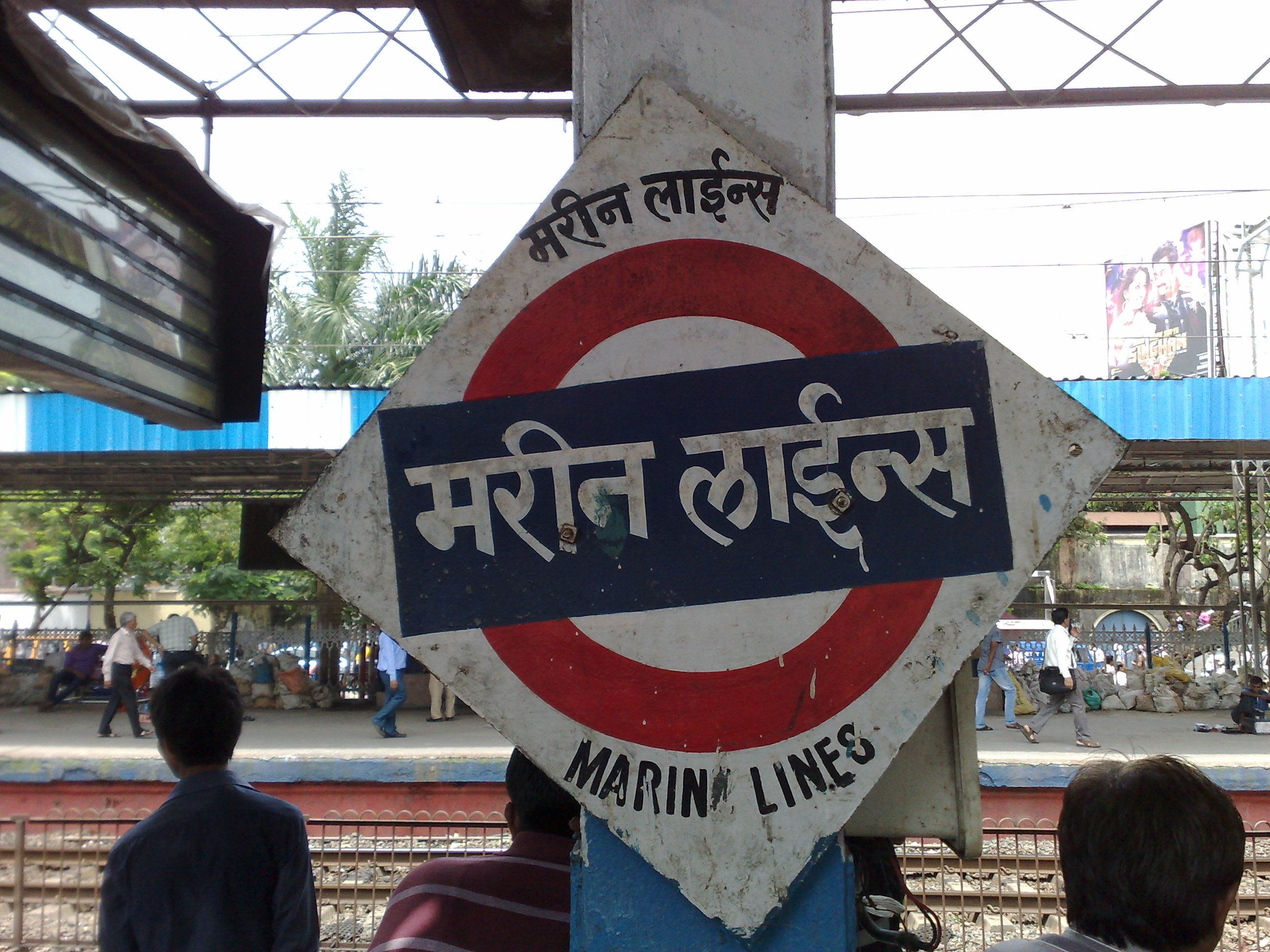
Marine Lines platform board

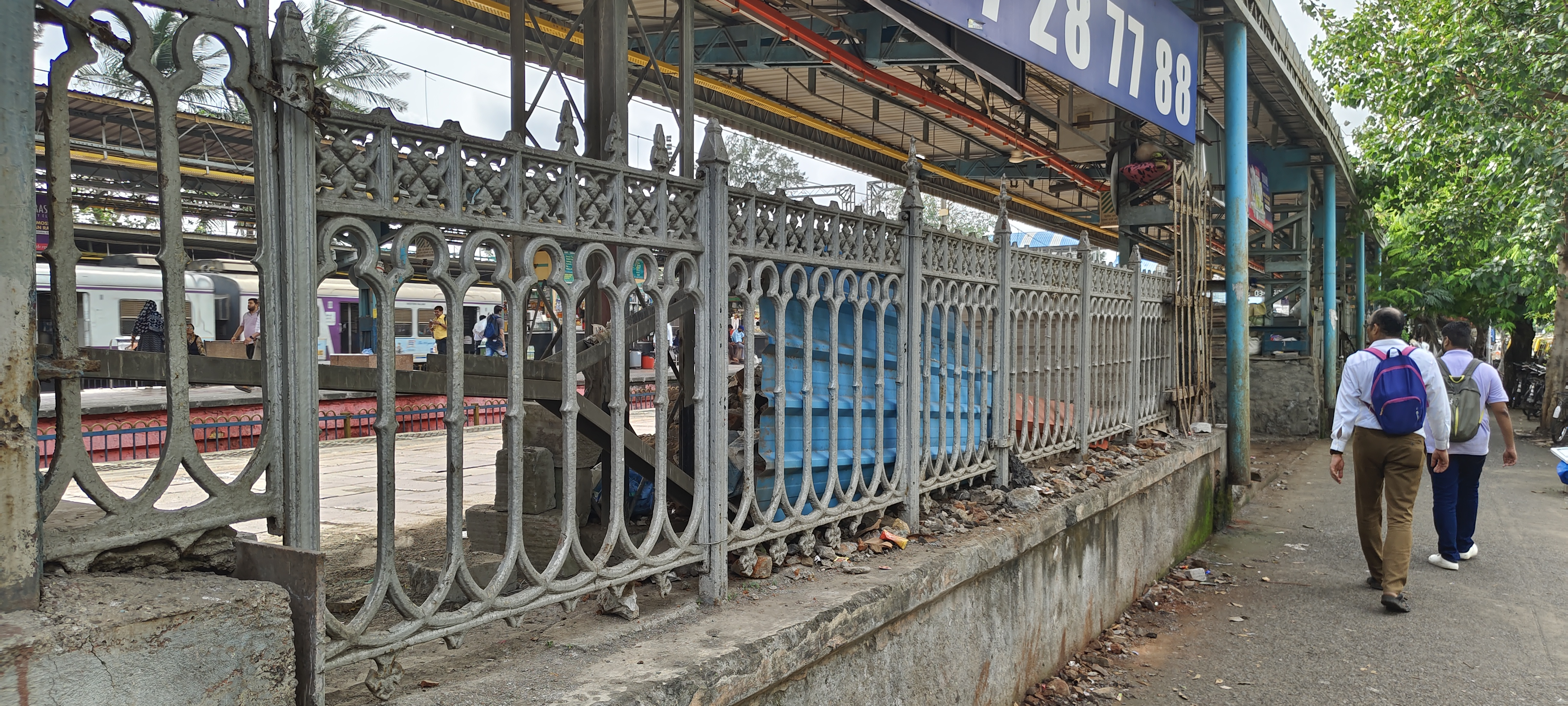
Cast Iron fences outside Marine Lines Station
