= 1947 Sylhet referendum =

Referendum in British India

Sylhet referendum
- 6 July 1947
- Should Sylhet join the province of East Bengal in Pakistan?
- Outcome: Karimganj subdivision remains in the India, the rest of Sylhet District joins the Pakistan.
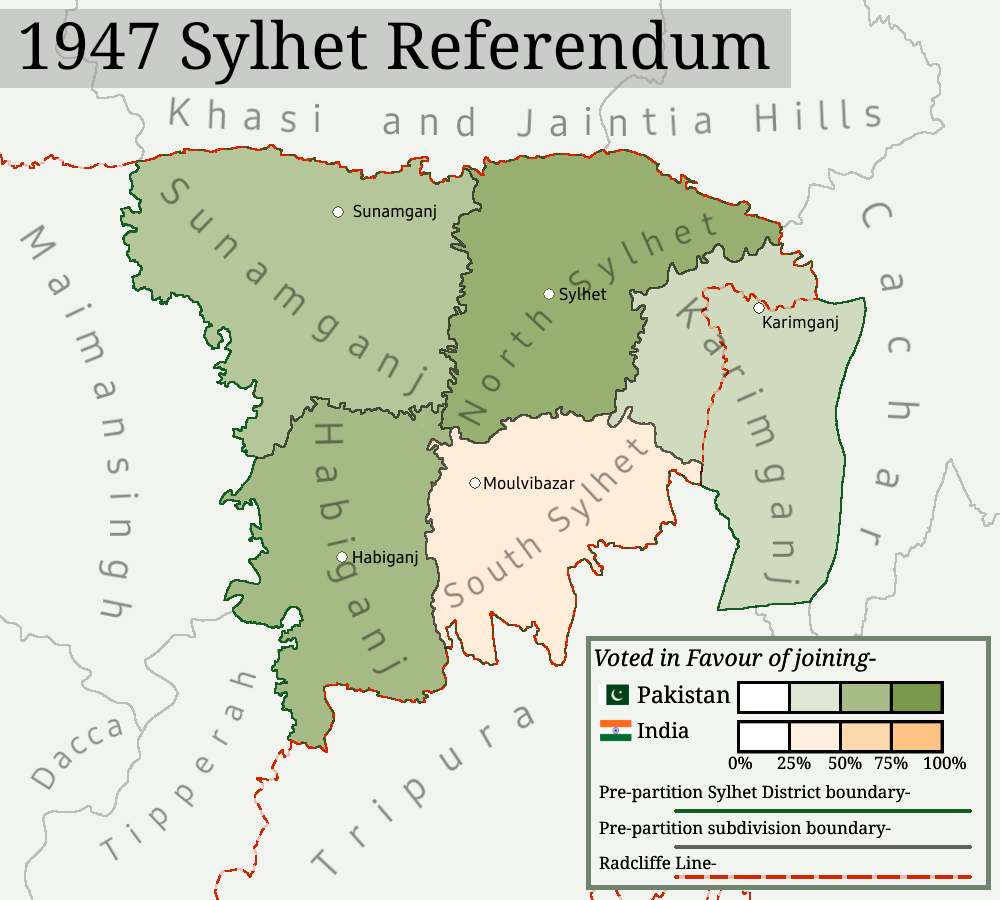
- Map of Sylhet district at the time of the 1947 Sylhet referendum.

The 1947 Sylhet referendum was held in the Sylhet district of the Assam Province of British India to decide whether the district would remain in undivided Assam and therefore within the post-independence Dominion of India, or leave Assam for East Bengal and consequently join the newly created Dominion of Pakistan. The referendum's turnout was in favour of joining the Pakistani union; however, the district's Karimganj subdivision remained within the Indian state of Assam.

== History ==
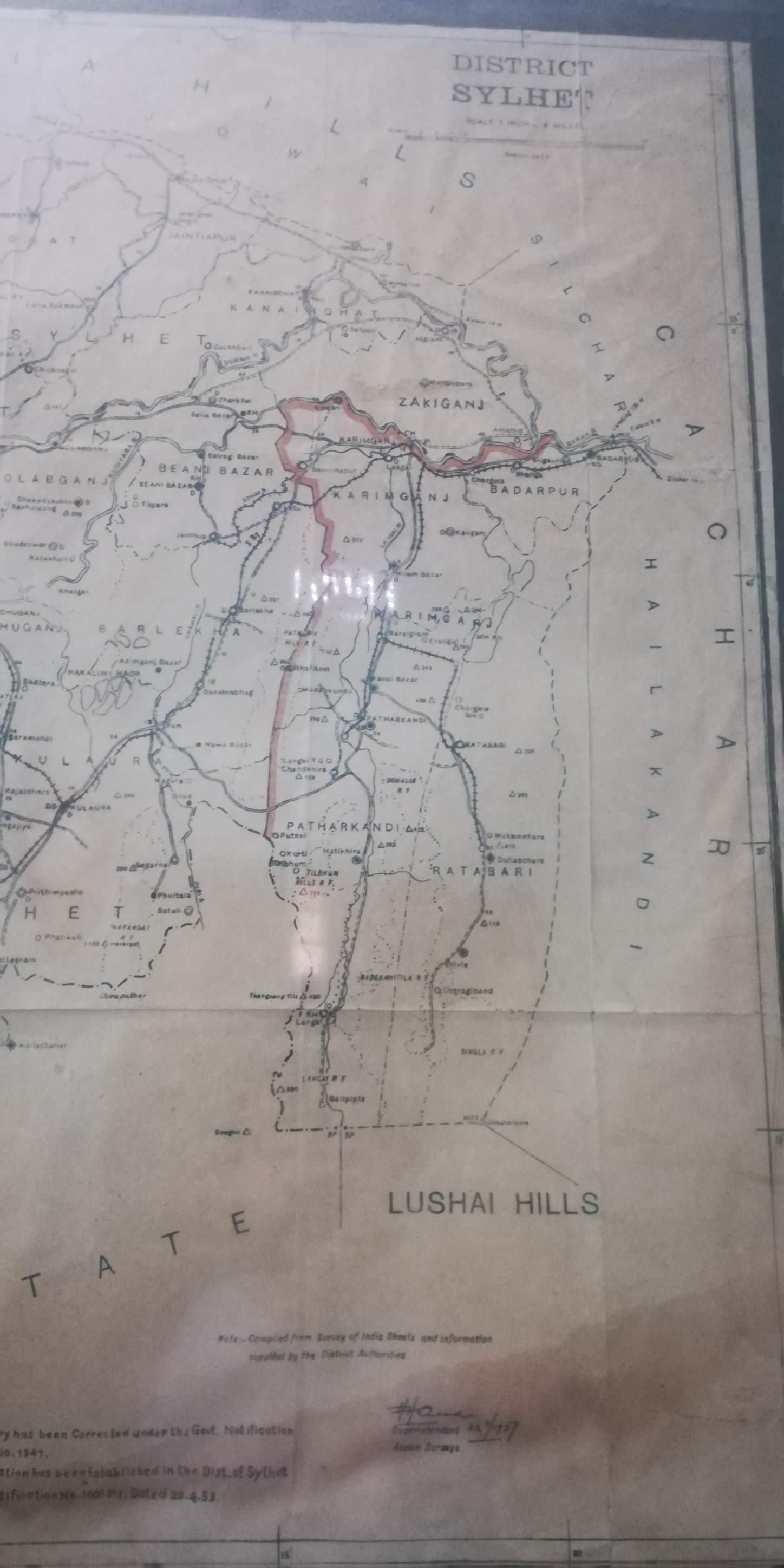
Undivided Sylhet district under British rule.

Prior to the British arrival in the region in late eighteenth century, the Sylhet Sarkar was a part of the Bengal Subah of the Mughal Empire. Initially, the Company Raj incorporated Sylhet into its Bengal Presidency; however, 109 years later on 16 February 1874, Sylhet was made a part of the non-regulation Chief Commissioner's Province of Assam (North-East Frontier) in order to facilitate Assam's commercial development. This transfer was implemented despite a memorandum of protests being submitted to the Viceroy, Lord Northbrook, on 10 August from the district's Sylheti-majority population which consisted of both Hindus and Muslims. These protests subsided when Northbrook visited Sylhet to reassure the people that education and justice would be administered from the city of Calcutta in Bengal, as well as when the Hindu zamindars of Sylhet realized the opportunity of employment in Assam's tea estates and a market for their produce.

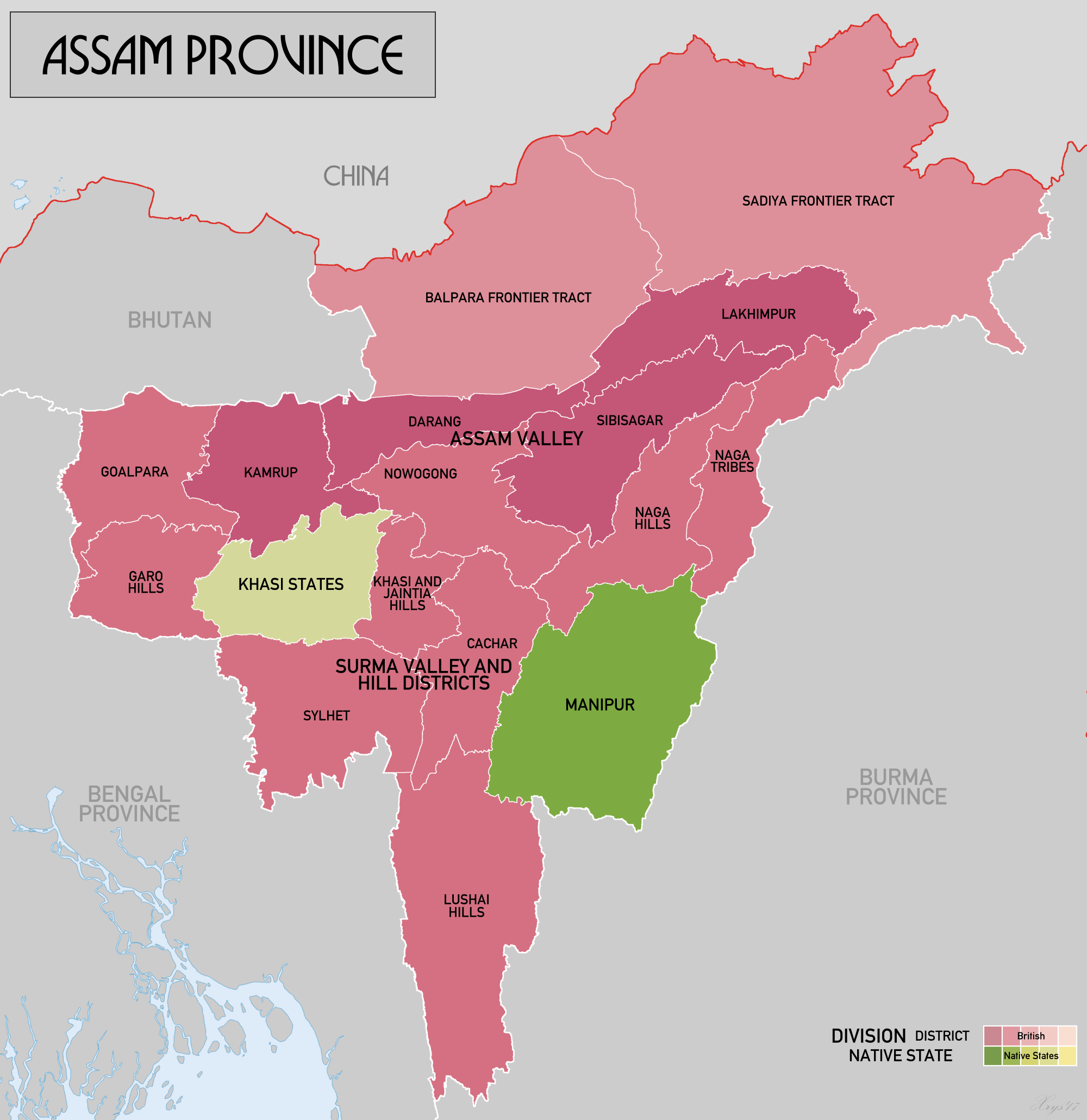
Surma Valley and Hill Districts under the Assam Province.

After the first partition of Bengal in 1905, Sylhet was briefly reincorporated with Eastern Bengal and Assam, as a part of the new province's Surma Valley and Hill Districts division. However, this reorganization was short-lived as Sylhet once again became separated from Bengal in 1912, when Assam Province was reconstituted into a Chief Commissioner's Province. By the 1920s, organisations such as the Sylhet Peoples' Association and Sylhet–Bengal Reunion League mobilized public opinion, demanding Sylhet's reincorporation into Bengal. However, the leaders of the Reunion League, including Muhammad Bakht Mauzumdar and Syed Abdul Majid, who were also involved in Assam's tea trade, later opposed the transfer of Sylhet and Cachar to Bengal in September 1928 during the Surma Valley Muslim Conference, supported by Abdul Majid's Anjuman-e-Islamia and Muslim Students Association.

== Background ==

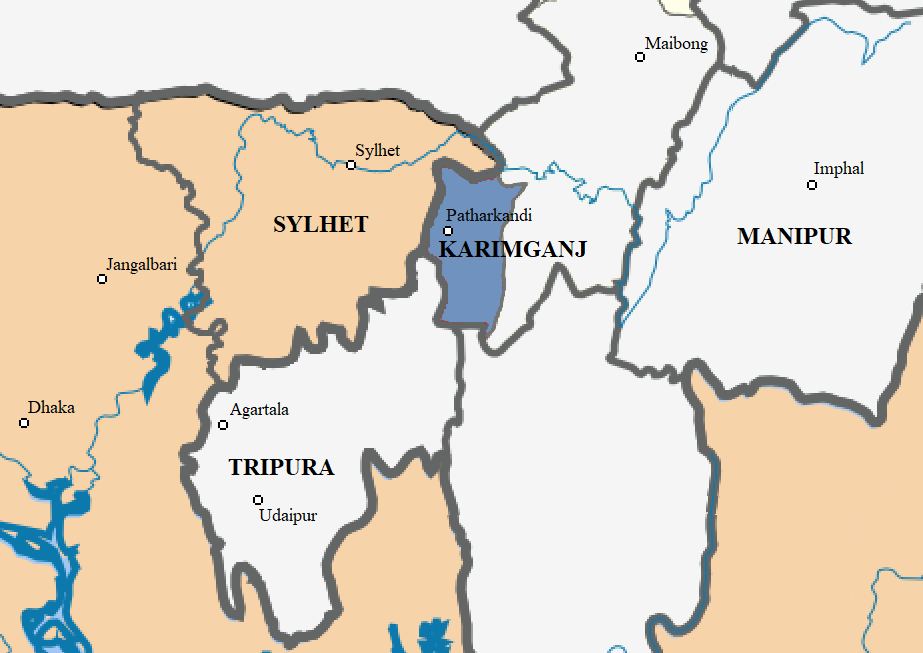
On the left is a map of Sylhet Division in present-day Bangladesh and on the right is a map of Karimganj district in present-day Assam, India

The partition of India was to happen along religious lines in August 1947. Muslim-majority areas would be combined to form the new Pakistan while non-Muslim and Hindu-majority areas would remain in India. Sylhet was a Muslim-majority Sylheti-speaking district in Assam, which was a Hindu-majority Assamese-speaking province. The Government of Assam believed that removing Sylhet would make the state more homogeneous and strongly unified as a result. Assam's Chief Minister, Gopinath Bordoloi, stated in 1946 that his wish was to "hand over Sylhet to East Bengal". The British Raj declared on 3 July 1947 that a referendum would be held on 6 July 1947 to decide the future of Sylhet. H. C. Stock was appointed as the commissioner of the referendum. Brigadier Mohinder Singh Chopra was in command of the "SYL Force" (Sylhet Force) made to keep the referendum peaceful, which is why there were no cases of riot or murder during the time.

== Result ==
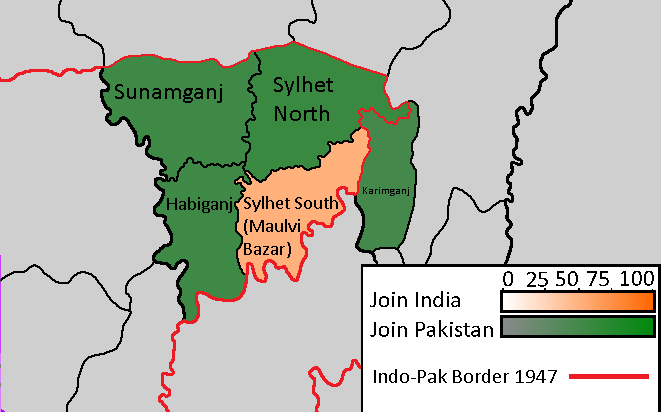
Map of Sylhet district at the time of the 1947 Sylhet referendum

The majority of the population voted in favour of joining Pakistan. This was implemented via Article 3 of the Indian Independence Act of 18 July 1947. The Radcliffe Line published on 17 August 1947 gave some areas of Sylhet – mainly Karimganj – to India, while the rest of Sylhet joined East Bengal, even though Karimganj had a Muslim-majority population which had opted for Pakistan, unlike some other areas in Sylhet like Moulvibazar. The putative cause of this was the plea of a group led by Abdul Matlib Mazumdar. India received three and a half thanas of Sylhet. Along with Karimganj, Zakiganj was also to be a part of independent India, but this was prevented by a delegation led by Sheikh Mujibur Rahman. Thus, most of the Sylhet District joined East Pakistan, which later emerged as the new country of Bangladesh in 1971 following the Bangladesh War of Independence. The result of the referendum was largely welcomed by the Assamese leadership. The Assam Pradesh Congress Committee, however, was displeasured by any thanas of Sylhet whatsoever remaining in Assam, urging Gopinath Bordoloi to protest against their inclusion.

After the referendum's conclusion, Jawaharlal Nehru told Mountbatten:

There was undoubtedly intimidation, false impersonation and incursion of Muslim National Guards from Bengal. But it seems clear both from the number of people who voted and the result of the voting that any irregularities that took place could not materially affect the result of the referendum

— Jawaharlal Nehru, Selected Works of Jawaharlal Nehru, Second Series, Vol. 3, pp. 185-186

Vallabhbhai Patel was of a similar opinion regarding the inevitability of the results.

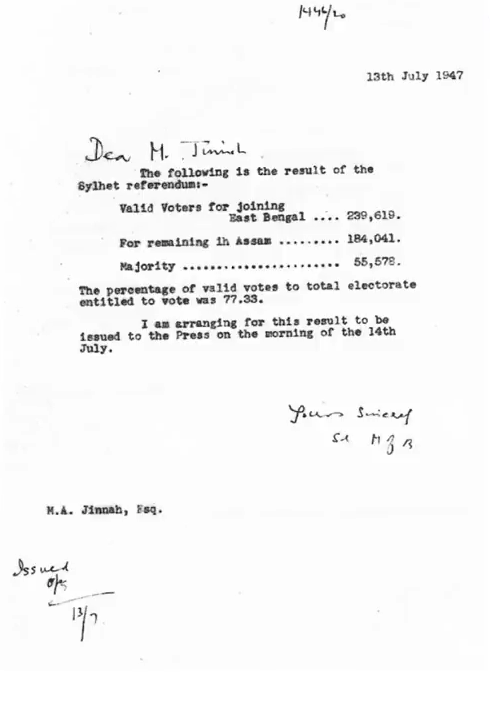
Letter on Results of Sylhet Referendum addressing M. A. Jinnah

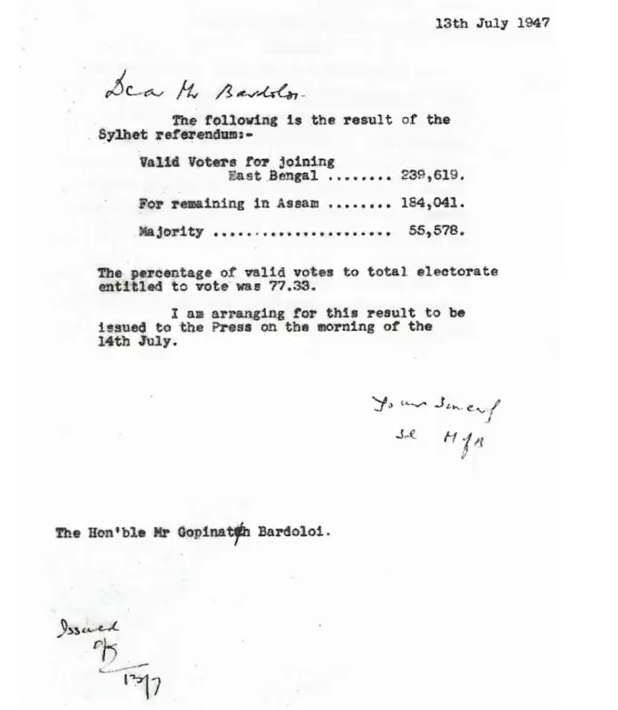
Letter on Results of Sylhet Referendum addressing Gopinath Bordoloi

Subdivision	Total Voters	Votes cast	Turnout %	Votes			
Subdivision	Total Voters	Votes cast	Turnout %	Assam (India)	%	East Bengal (Pakistan)	%
Sylhet North	1,41,131	1,07,252	76.00	38,871	36.24	68,381	63.76
Sylhet South (Moulvibazar)	79,024	65,189	82.49	33,471	51.34	31,718	48.66
Habiganj	1,35,526	91,495	67.51	36,952	40.39	54,543	59.61
Sunamganj	90,891	77,926	85.74	34,211	43.90	43,715	56.10
Karimganj	1,00,243	81,798	81.60	40,536	49.56	41,262	50.44
Total	5,46,815	4,23,660	77.48	1,84,041	43.44	2,39,619	56.56

== See also ==
- 1947 North-West Frontier Province referendum, a similar referendum held in present-day Khyber Pakhtunkhwa, Pakistan
- 1948 Junagadh referendum, a similar referendum held in present-day Junagadh, India
- Undivided Sylhet district
- History of Sylhet
- Sylhet Division
- Sylhetis
- Sylheti language
