= Masjid railway station =

Railway Station in Maharashtra, India

Masjid Masjid Bunder
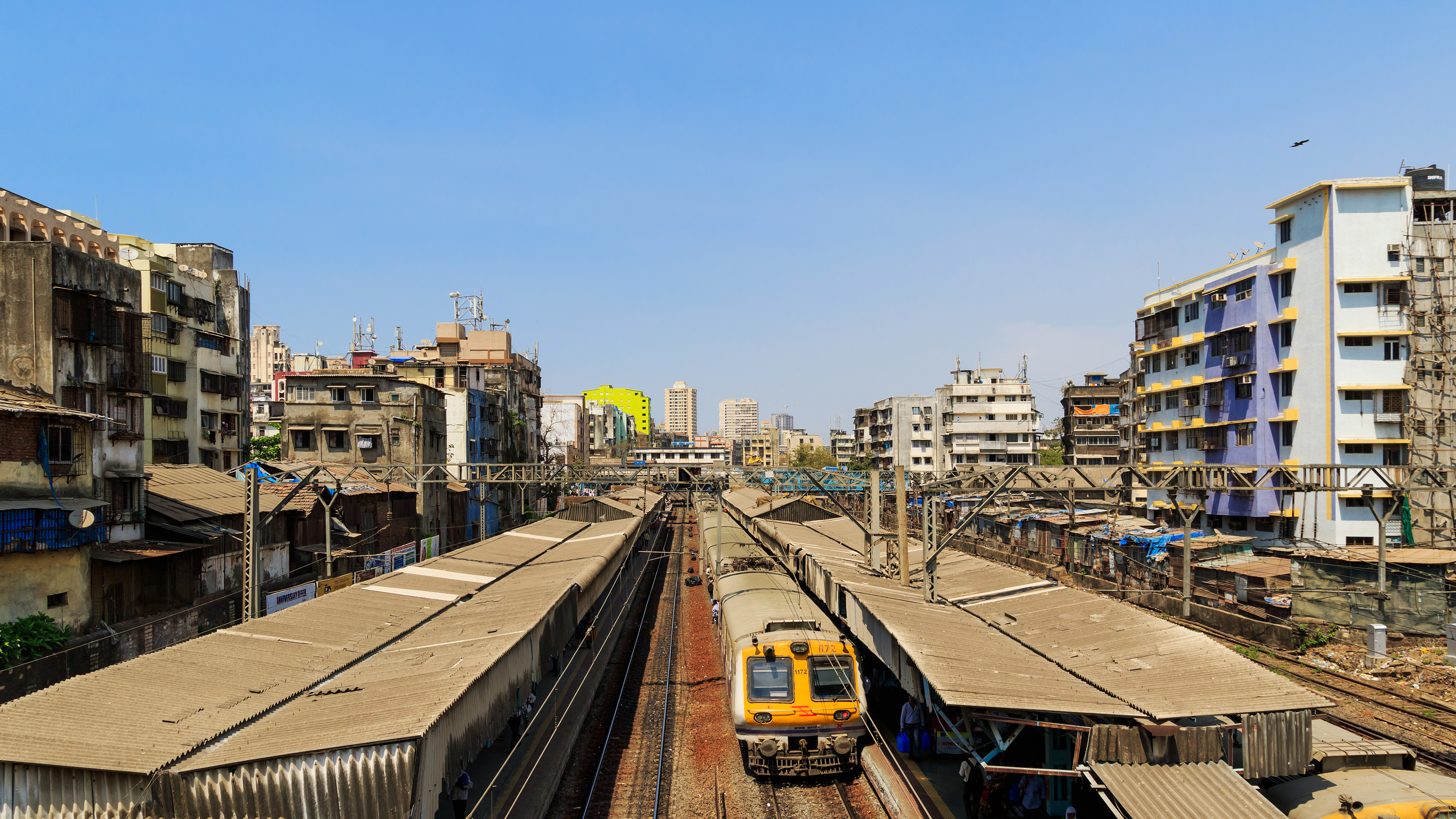

General information
- Coordinates: 18.9519°N 72.8382°E
- System: Indian Railways and Mumbai Suburban Railway station
- Owner: Ministry of Railways, Indian Railways
- Lines: Central Line, Harbour Line
- Platforms: 4
- Tracks: 6

Construction
- Structure type: Standard on-ground station

Other information
- Status: Active
- Station code: MSD
- Fare zone: Central Railways

History
- Opened: 20 September 1875

Services
| Preceding station | Mumbai Suburban Railway | Following station |
|---|---|---|
| Chhatrapati Shivaji Terminus Terminus | Central line | Sandhurst Road towards Kasara or Khopoli |
| Chhatrapati Shivaji Terminus Terminus | Harbour line | Sandhurst Road towards Goregaon or Panvel |
Route map
Location
- Location within India Location within Maharashtra Location within Mumbai

Masjid (station code: MSD) is a railway station in the Masjid Bunder area of South Mumbai on the Central and Harbour lines of the Mumbai Suburban Railway. It is the penultimate stop for all trains on those lines in the "up" direction. It was opened on 20 September 1875. The station is named after a Jewish synagogue, "Shaar Harahamim The Gate of Mercy Synagogue" which is about 200 mts. away from the railway station. In the local Marathi language, a synagogue is called a mashid (mosque) just like a Muslim mosque.

The station has four platforms (two for Harbour Line and two for Main Line). The volume of passengers on this station is very high due to different wholesale markets (i.e., Crawford Market) surrounding the station. These markets, referred to as bazaars, have various wholesale merchants, called stockists.

Stockists from the Iron Market (Lokhand Bazaar), situated on the Eastern side of the railway station and Diamond Traders situated on Western side make trades of millions of Rupees each day in the markets. The southern end towards CSMT leads to Yousuf Mehar Ali Road, Jama Masjid, Kalbadevi, Crawford Market, Mandvi and the surrounding area.

Due to the docks, Masjid is a prominent area recognized as the hub of the larger shipping and maritime companies of India. The first office of the Reliance Commercial Corporation was set up at the Narsinathan Street in Masjid Bunder.
