= Princess Street (Mumbai) =

Street in Mumbai, India

Princess Street is a road in south Mumbai, India. The official name of this road is Samaldas Gandhi Marg, named after the Indian freedom fighter who had led the Arzi Hukumat (Temporary Government) of the erstwhile princely state of Junagadh in 1947. The road links the Marine Drive flyover with Crawford Market, and is known for its shops selling chemicals, medicines, and medical equipment. It serves the busy Marine Lines railway station, as well as the adjoining localities of Thakurdwar and Bhuleshwar to its north and Dhobitalao to its south.
