= Samaldas Gandhi =

Indian journalist

- Portrait of Samaldas

Head of Provisional Government of Junagadh
- In office 25 September 1947 – 9 November 1947
- Preceded by: Office created
- Succeeded by: Office abolished

Personal details
- Born: 1897 Porbandar State, British India (Now Porbandar, Gujarat, India)
- Died: 1953 (aged 55–56) Bombay State, British India (Now Maharashtra and Gujarat, India)
- Spouse: Vijayaben
- Children: 4

Samaldas Gandhi (1897–1953) was a journalist and Indian independence activist who headed the Aarzi Hakumat or Provisional Government of the erstwhile princely state of Junagadh. He was a nephew of Mahatma Gandhi.

== Early life ==
Samaldas was born in 1897. He was a son of Laxmidas/Kalidas Karamchand Gandhi and Nandkunwarba. Samaldas was a close follower of his uncle, Mahatma Gandhi.

== Career ==
=== Journalism ===
Gandhi joined Gujarati evening newspaper Janmabhoomi. He served as a deputy editor and later editor of it from 1937 to 1940. Due to differences with Amrutlal Sheth, the founder of Janmabhoomi, regarding policy regarding princely states, he left Janmabhoomi in 1940 and started a new Gujarati daily Vande Mataram. Vande Mataram became popular.

=== Politics ===
He was active in politics and social activities. He was the President of Kathiawar Praja Mandal which brought awareness in Bombay regarding problem of people of Kathiawar. He was also welcome president of the Kathiawar Praja Sammelan held at Azad Maidan in Bombay in June 1947. He opposed Jam Group Scheme regarding integration of princely states of Kathiawar.

When the Nawab of Junagadh State acceded his state to Pakistan in 1947, Samaldas Gandhi, U. N. Dhebar and members of Junagadh Praja Mandal met at the office of Vande Mataram on 19 August 1947. He was specially invited to attend Kathiawar Rajakiya Prishad on 25 August 1947. A five-member committee called Junagadh Samiti was formed on 15 September 1947 which included Samaldas Gandhi. Gandhi met V. P. Menon and proposed to form a government-in-exile, the Aarzi Hakumat or Provisional Government of Junagadh State. On 25 September 1947, the Aarzi Hukumat headed by Samaldas Gandhi was declared in a public meeting at Madhavbagh in Bombay.

The five member ministry of Aarzi Hakumat went to Rajkot. Gandhi became the Prime Minister and also held ministry of foreign affairs. Aarzi Hakumat captured 160 villages in forty days, from 30 September to 8 November 1947. Junagadh acceded to the India on 9 November 1947.

After six months, Gandhi was appointed as one of the three civilian members for the administration of Junagadh on 1 June 1948. He was one of the seven members elected unopposed to the Constitution Assembly of Saurashtra in December 1948. All seven members voted to merge Junagadh State with Saurashtra and it was merged in January 1949. Gandhi served as the minister of revenue of Saurashtra State from 25 January 1949 to 18 January 1950. He resigned following personal differences.

Later he and his publication Vande Mataram faced financial difficulties. He died on 8 June 1953.

== Commemoration ==
Samaldas Gandhi is widely remembered in Junagadh and Gujarat today as a hero and patriot. There are several schools, public foundations and hospitals named after him.

The Princess Street in Mumbai has been renamed as Samaldas Gandhi Marg.

The townhall in Junagadh is dedicated to him.

== Personal life ==
He married Vijayaben and had two sons, Kishor and Hemant; and two daughters, Pushpa and Manjari. Kishor Gandhi published a children's magazine Ramakadu.

== See also ==
- Indian Independence Movement
- Political integration of India
