= Kalbadevi =

- Neighbourhood
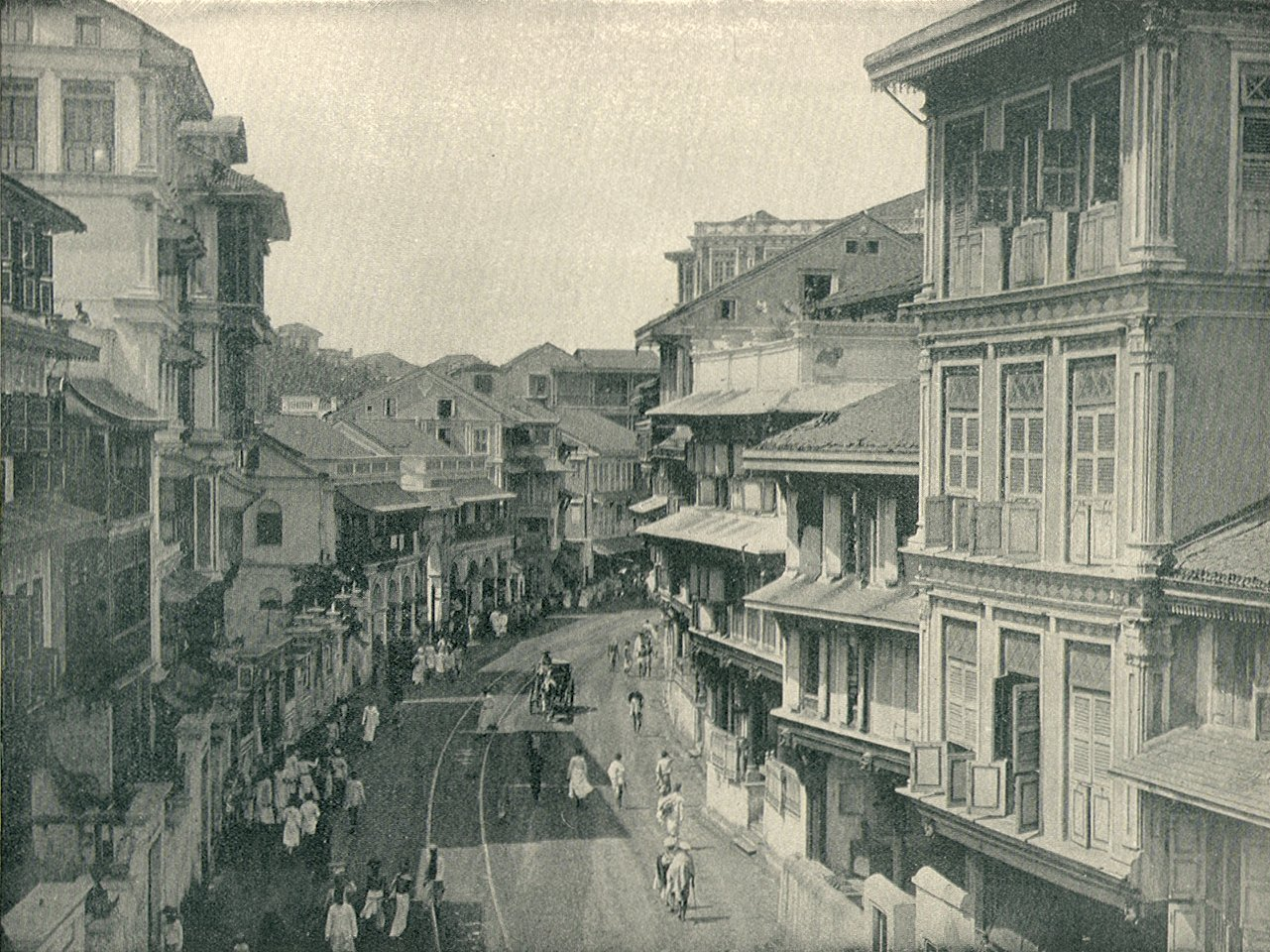
- Kalbadevi road in c. 1890
- Interactive map of Kalbadevi
- Coordinates: 18.955°N 72.835°E
- Country: India
- State: Maharashtra
- Metro: Mumbai

Languages
  - Official: Marathi
- Time zone: UTC+5:30 (IST)
- PIN: 400002
- Area code: 022
- Vehicle registration: MH 01
- Civic agency: BMC

Kalbadevi is an old neighbourhood in Mumbai (Bombay), India. It is named after Goddess Kalbadevi, the Hindu Goddess. Kalbadevi area is one of the busiest areas during peak hours. The area has mostly traders in watches, bicycles, steel utensils, etc.

== Kalbadevi temple ==
The Kalbadevi temple, after which this neighbourhood is named was relocated twice. It is believed that the original temple was located in Mahim, but the image of the goddess was kept hidden for five hundred years. After being found, it was installed in this neighbourhood. It was relocated again when the Government decided to widen the road for laying a tramline. The original structure was demolished and the government financed the entire expenditure for the construction of the present structure. The management of the present temple was handed over to Raghunath Joshi after relocation.

== Kalbadevi Fire Hazard ==
In the major fire hazard of August 15, 2015 developed in Kalbadevi area a massive fire incident happened at Kalbadevi in Mumbai.

== See also ==
- Jama Masjid, Mumbai
