= Mandvi, Mumbai =

Location in South Mumbai in India

Coordinates: 18°57′N 72°50′E

Mandvi is an area in South Mumbai near Masjid Bunder. It is located near Pydhone. It has a high Muslim population. In the eighteenth and nineteenth centuries it had a small, but thriving Jewish community. The 300-year-old Gate of Mercy Synagogue is located in this Umerkhadi area of South Mumbai.
